= List of archbishops of the Anglican Church of Kenya =

Archbishops of the Anglican Church of Kenya

This is a list of the Archbishops and Primates of the Anglican Church of Kenya. The Anglican presence in Kenya was initially overseen by the Church of England through the Diocese of Mauritius, established in 1854, and later through the Diocese of Eastern Equatorial Africa, created in 1884. As the Anglican Church grew, the Church of the province of East Africa was established in 1960, uniting the dioceses of Kenya and Tanganyika (now Tanzania). In 1970, the province was divided, leading to the formation of the Church of the province of Kenya and the Church of the province of Tanzania. In 1998, the Church of the province of Kenya was renamed the Anglican Church of Kenya to reflect its national identity. The current Archbishop and Primate of the Anglican Church of Kenya also serves as the bishop of the Diocese of All Saints' Cathedral in Nairobi, the primatial see of the province.

== Church of England (1854–1960) ==
No.	Bishop	Image	Took office	Left office	Diocese	Length of term
1	Vincent William Ryan		November 30, 1854	February 24, 1869	Mauritius	14 years, 86 days
2	Thomas Goodwin Hatchard		February 24, 1869	February 28, 1870	Mauritius	1 year, 4 days
3	Henry Constantine Huxtable		November 24, 1870	August 11, 1871	Mauritius	260 days
4	Vincent William Ryan		1872	1872	Mauritius	
5	Peter Sorenson Royston		December 15, 1872	June 24, 1884	Mauritius	11 years, 192 days
6	James Hannington		June 24, 1884	February 8, 1886	Eastern Equatorial Africa	1 year, 229 days
7	Henry Perrott Parker		October 18, 1886	March 26, 1888	Eastern Equatorial Africa	1 year, 160 days
8	Alfred Robert Tucker		April 25, 1890	June 29, 1899	Eastern Equatorial Africa	9 years, 65 days
9	William George Peel		June 29, 1899	April 15, 1916	Mombasa	16 years, 291 days
10	Richard Stanley Heywood		April 21, 1918	December 31, 1935	Mombasa	17 years, 185 days
11	Reginald Percy Crabbe		November 30, 1936	September 30, 1953	Mombasa	16 years, 337 days
12	Leonard James Beecher		February 2, 1954	August 3, 1960	Mombasa	6 years, 183 days

== Church of the Province of East Africa (1960–1970) ==
No.	Archbishop	Image	Took office	Left office	Diocese	Length of term
1	Leonard James Beecher		August 3, 1960	August 3, 1970	Mombasa; Nairobi	10 years, 0 days

== Church of the Province of Kenya (1970–1998) and Anglican Church of Kenya (1998–Present) ==
No.	Presiding Bishop	Image	Took office	Left office	Diocese	Length of term
1	Festo Habakkuk Olang'		August 3, 1970	June 29, 1980	Mombasa; Maseno, Maseno North; Nairobi	9 years, 331 days
2	Manasses Kuria		June 29, 1980	July 29, 1994	Nakuru; Nairobi	14 years, 30 days
3	David Mukuba Gitari		January 12, 1997	September 16, 2002	Mount Kenya East; Kirinyaga; Nairobi	5 years, 247 days
4	Benjamin Paul Mwanzia Nzimbi		September 22, 2002	September 30, 2009	Machakos; Kitui; All Saints' Cathedral Diocese	7 years, 8 days
5	Eliud Wamukekhe Wabukala		July 5, 2009	June 26, 2016	Bungoma; All Saints' Cathedral Diocese	6 years, 357 days
6	Jackson Nasoore Ole Sapit		July 3, 2016	—	Kericho; All Saints' Cathedral Diocese	9 years, 287 days
