= List of bishops of the Anglican Church of Kenya =

This list consists of the bishops in the Anglican Church of Kenya (ACK), which is part of the worldwide Anglican Communion. The list includes the sequence of consecration, the dioceses they served, and other relevant details. It begins with the earliest bishops appointed by the Church of England before the establishment of the independent Anglican Church of Kenya. This list reflects the development and leadership transitions within the Anglican Church of Kenya, emphasizing the role of the bishops in shaping the church's direction, both during the colonial period and in independent Kenya.

== Chart of bishop succession ==
- Archbishop
- Diocesan bishop (Ordinary)
- Suffragan bishop
- Coadjutor bishop
- Provisional bishop
- Assistant bishop
- Bishop pro tempore

The Roman numeral before the diocese name represents where in the sequence that bishop falls; e.g., the fourth bishop of Mombasa is written "IV Mombasa". Where a diocese is in bold type it indicates that the bishop is a current bishop of that diocese.

=== 1–100 ===
No.	Bishop	Consecrators	Date	Diocese	Notes
1	Vincent William Ryan	John Bird Sumner, John Lonsdale, John Graham, George Tomlinson	November 30, 1854	I Mauritius – Suffolk (archdcn.) – Craven (archdcn.) – Ripon (comm.)	First Anglican bishop in the region, overseeing from Mauritius. Returned on a special mission in 1872.
2	Thomas Goodwin Hatchard	Archibald Campbell Tait, George Augustus Selwyn	February 24, 1869	II Mauritius	Died in office.
3	Henry Constantine Huxtable		November 24, 1870	III Mauritius	Died in office.
4	Peter Sorenson Royston		December 15, 1872	IV Mauritius – Liverpool (asst.)	
5	James Hannington	Edward White Benson	June 24, 1884	I Eastern Equatorial Africa	Martyred in Uganda; first bishop of the Diocese of Eastern Equatorial Africa.
6	Henry Perrott Parker	Edward White Benson, Frederick Temple, Harvey Goodwin, 4, Graham Ingham, George Moule	October 18, 1886	II Eastern Equatorial Africa	
7	Alfred Robert Tucker	Edward White Benson	April 25, 1890	III Eastern Equatorial Africa – I Uganda – Durham (can.)	
8	William George Peel	Frederick Temple	June 29, 1899	I Mombasa	First Bishop of Mombasa, serving until his death in 1916.
9	Richard Stanley Heywood	James Palmer	April 21, 1918	II Mombasa – Coventry (asst.)	
10	Reginald Percy Crabbe	Cosmo Gordon Lang	November 30, 1936	III Mombasa – Portsmouth (asst.)	Oversaw the diocese during the pre-independence era.
11	Leonard James Beecher		1954	IV Mombasa	First Archbishop of the province of East Africa, also Bishop of Nairobi (1964–1970).
12	Festo Habakkuk Olang'		1955	V Mombasa	Assistant Bishop for Western Kenya; became first Bishop of Maseno.
13	Obadiah Kariuki		1955	V Mombasa	Assistant Bishop for Central and Eastern Kenya; became first Bishop of Fort Hall.
14	Peter Mwang’ombe		1964	VI Mombasa	Bishop of Mombasa from 1964 until his resignation in 1981.
14	Crispus Nzano		1981	VII Mombasa	Previously assistant bishop; served until 1994.
15	Alexander Muge		1983	I Eldoret	First Bishop of Eldoret, consecrated from Nakuru diocese.
16	Benjamin Paul Mwanzia Nzimbi		1985	I Machakos	First Bishop of Machakos, later became Archbishop.
17	Stephen Kewasis		1992	I Kitale	First Bishop of Kitale, previously served as Bishop of Eldoret.
18	Julius Kalu		1994	VIII Mombasa	
19	Thomas Kogo		1997	II Eldoret	
20	Josephat Mule		2002	I Machakos - II Kitui	
21	Rob Martin		2008	I Marsabit	Suffragan for Marsabit Mission Area, later became diocesan Bishop of Marsabit.
22	Bill Atwood		2007	I International Diocese (ACNA)	Suffragan Bishop, later became diocesan Bishop of the International Diocese of ACNA.
23	Cleti Ogeto		2007	I Lodwar	
24	David Mutisya		2007	I Garissa	
25	Joel Waweru		2010	V Nairobi	
26	Joseph Muchai		2012	II Nakuru	
27	Gadiel Lenini		2012	II Kajiado	
28	Joseph Mutungi		2013	I Makueni	
29	Francis Mboya Matui		2016	II Makueni	
30	Ernest Ng'eno		2016	I Kericho	First Bishop of Kericho after its creation from Nakuru diocese.
31	Jacob Lesuuda		2015	I Maralal	
32	Paul Korir		2016	I Kapsabet	
33	Emmanuel Chemengich		2018	II Kitale	
34	Liverson Mng'onda{Diocese of Taita taveta}		2016	II Taita-Taveta	
35	Lawrence Dena		2015	IX Malindi	First Bishop of Malindi, previously assistant bishop of Mombasa.

== See also ==
- Anglican Communion
- Apostolic Succession
- Historical Episcopate
- Church of England's Role in Kenya
- GAFCON Movement
