= David Gitari =

The Most Reverend David Gitari
- Archbishop of Kenya, Bishop of Nairobi
- Church: Anglican Church of Kenya
- In office: 1997–2002
- Predecessor: Manasses Kuria
- Successor: Benjamin Nzimbi
- Previous posts: I Mount Kenya East; I Kirinyaga

Orders
- Ordination: 1972 by Obadiah Kariuki
- Consecration: 1975 by Festo Olang'

Personal details
- Born: 16 September 1937
- Died: 30 September 2013 (aged 76) Nairobi, Kenya

David Mukuba Gitari (16 September 1937 – 30 September 2013) was a Kenyan Anglican archbishop. He was the third primate and archbishop of the Anglican Church of Kenya, from 1997 to 2002, and at the same time, Bishop of the Diocese of Nairobi. He was married to Grace Wanjiru, since 1966, and they had three children.

== Early life and religious career ==
Gitari was born in Ngiriambu in Kirinyaga County to Samuel Mukuba, who was an Anglican Evangelist, and Jessie Njuku. Gitari studied at the Kangaru High School, in Embu, and at the University of Nairobi, where he obtained a Bachelor of Arts degree. He studied theology at the University of Bristol as an external student of the University of London.

He was ordained an Anglican priest in 1972 by Bishop Obadiah Kariuki. He was consecrated the first bishop of the Diocese of Mount Kenya East on 20 July 1975, aged only 37 years old. He was the founder of St. Andrews College of Theology and Development in Kabare. He remained in office until 1990, when the Diocese of Mount Kenya East was divided into two new dioceses, Embu and Kirinyaga. He was then nominated the first bishop of the Diocese of Kirinyaga, which he was until 1996.

Gitari tenure at the Dioceses of Mount Kenya East and Kirinyanga witness an amazing growth of membership, due to his Evangelicalism. He led many missions in Kenyan universities and also promoted the development, theological education, liturgical renewal and women's ordination to the priesthood. He served as chairman of the Provincial Board of Theological Education at the Anglican Church of Kenya. He was also chairman of the board of St. Paul's University, Limuru. He was involved with the ecumenical movement, both with Protestants and Roman Catholics.

Gitari pastoral work led to political controversy, since he felt it was his duty to preach against land grabbing by powerful politicians and economic injustice. He also protested against constitutional changes that led to vote by queuing instead of secret vote. His strong opposition to undemocratic practises, namely queuing during 1988 general elections and to political killings earned him many foes. In the night of 21 April 1989, his house was raided by a group of about 100 thugs who threatened to kill him. The help of his neighbours lead to the bandits escape.

== Archbishop of Kenya (1997–2002) ==
He was elected the third primate and archbishop of the Anglican Church of Kenya and enthroned on 12 January 1997 at All Saints Cathedral, in Nairobi. He remained in office until his retirement, on 16 September 2002. During his tenure, he worked to create peace and unity in the church and to solve the divisions and quarrels at their dioceses, since several did not have bishops due to allegations of nepotism and tribalism, often related to political influence. He revived the Anglican Theological Education by Extension program, which was floundering in several dioceses, and helped launch the official website of the Anglican Church of Kenya.

He was succeeded as Archbishop of Kenya by Benjamin Nzimbi, who honoured him in his enthronement speech, on 22 September 2002. He also quoted a kishwahili poem in tribute to Gitari that read: "Gitari ni hodari. Gitari ni daktari. Gitari ni jemedari. Gitari ni hatari." (Gitari is bold. Gitari is a doctor. Gitari is an army commander. Gitari is dangerous.).

Kenyan Anglican priest Alfred S. Keyas wrote on Gitari: "Gitari will be remembered for his bold messages from the pulpit. Along with other fellow clergymen such as Njoya, Okullu, and Muge, Gitari had the courage to criticize and hold the government accountable for its actions. Like Muge, Gitari believed in the power of the pulpit to transform and reform society. Through the power of the spoken word, Gitari scared politicians and quelled the storm of social lies proclaimed by those whose interest was to enrich themselves at the expense of the poor."

He died in Mater Hospital, in Nairobi, on 30 September 2013, aged 76.

Gitari published several books and sermons, including Let the Bishop Speak (1986) and In Season and Out of Season: Sermons to a Nation (1996). His autobiography, Troubled But Not Destroyed, was published posthumously in 2014.

== See also ==
- List of archbishops of the Anglican Church of Kenya
- List of bishops of the Anglican Church of Kenya

Anglican Communion titles
Preceded by Manasses Kuria	Archbishop of Kenya; 1997–2002	Succeeded by Benjamin Nzimbi as Primate and Archbishop of All Kenya; Bishop of All Saints' Cathedral
Preceded by Manasses Kuria	Bishop of Nairobi; 1997–2002	Succeeded by Peter Njoka
New title	Bishop of Kirinyaga; 1990–1996	Succeeded by Daniel Ngoru
New title	Bishop of Mount Kenya East; 1975–1990	Succeeded by Moses Njue as Bishop of Embu
