= Jackson Ole Sapit =

Kenyan Anglican Bishop

The Most Reverend Jackson Ole Sapit
- Bishop of All Saints' Cathedral, Archbishop and Primate of All Kenya
- Church: Anglican Church of Kenya
- Predecessor: Eliud Wabukala
- Previous posts: Kericho (suffr.); I Kericho

Orders
- Ordination: July 1992
- Consecration: 2005 by Benjamin Nzimbi

Personal details
- Born: June 1964 (age 61–62)

Jackson Nasoore Ole Sapit (born 12 June 1964) is a Kenyan Anglican bishop. He was elected as the sixth archbishop and primate of the Anglican Church of Kenya on 20 May 2016 and was installed on 3 July 2016 at All Saints' Cathedral in Nairobi.

== Early life and education ==
Sapit was baptised in 1977. He attended Rotian Primary School from 1973 to 1980, and Narok High School, from 1981 to 1984. He was confirmed in 1985 and worked as an evangelist and community motivator in Narok from 1987 to 1988.

Sapit studied at Berea Theological College in Nakuru from 1989 to 1991 to obtain a Diploma in Theology.

== Ministry ==
He was ordained a deacon in July 1991 and a priest in July 1992. He was vicar at Belgut Parish in the Diocese of Nakuru from 1992 to 1994. He studied at St. Paul's University, Limuru from 1994 to 1997, where he obtained the degree of Bachelor of Divinity. He obtained a Certificate in Research/Consultancy at Daystar University in 1999. He was vicar and project manager at Transmara Rural Development Programme in Kilgoris Parish from 1997 to 2002. He moved to the University of Reading in England where he obtained a M.A. in Social Development and Sustainable Livelihoods, in 2002/2003. In 2012 he was awarded an honorary doctorate in professional studies by the California-based Global University for Lifelong Learning.

Sapit was Diocesan Mission and Development Coordinator at the Diocese of Nakuru, from 2003 to 2004. He was suffragan bishop at the Diocese of Kericho from 2005 to 2007. He has been diocesan bishop of the Diocese of Kericho since 2008.

He was elected from six contenders as the sixth archbishop and primate of the Anglican Church of Kenya at the House of Bishops meeting that took place at All Saints' Cathedral, Nairobi on 20 May 2016. He was installed on 3 July 2016 at All Saints' Cathedral. Sapit is a supporter of the Anglican realignment and his election was welcomed by several of the primates in the Global Anglican Future Conference.

== See also ==
- List of archbishops of the Anglican Church of Kenya
- List of bishops of the Anglican Church of Kenya

Anglican Communion titles
Preceded by Eliud Wabukala	Primate and Archbishop of All Kenya; 2016–	Incumbent
Preceded by Eliud Wabukala	Bishop of All Saints' Cathedral; 2016–	Incumbent
New title	Bishop of Kericho; 2008–2016	Succeeded by Ernest Ng'eno
