= Manasses Kuria =

Kenyan archbishop (1929–2005)

The Most Reverend Manasses Kuria
- Archbishop of Kenya, Bishop of Nairobi
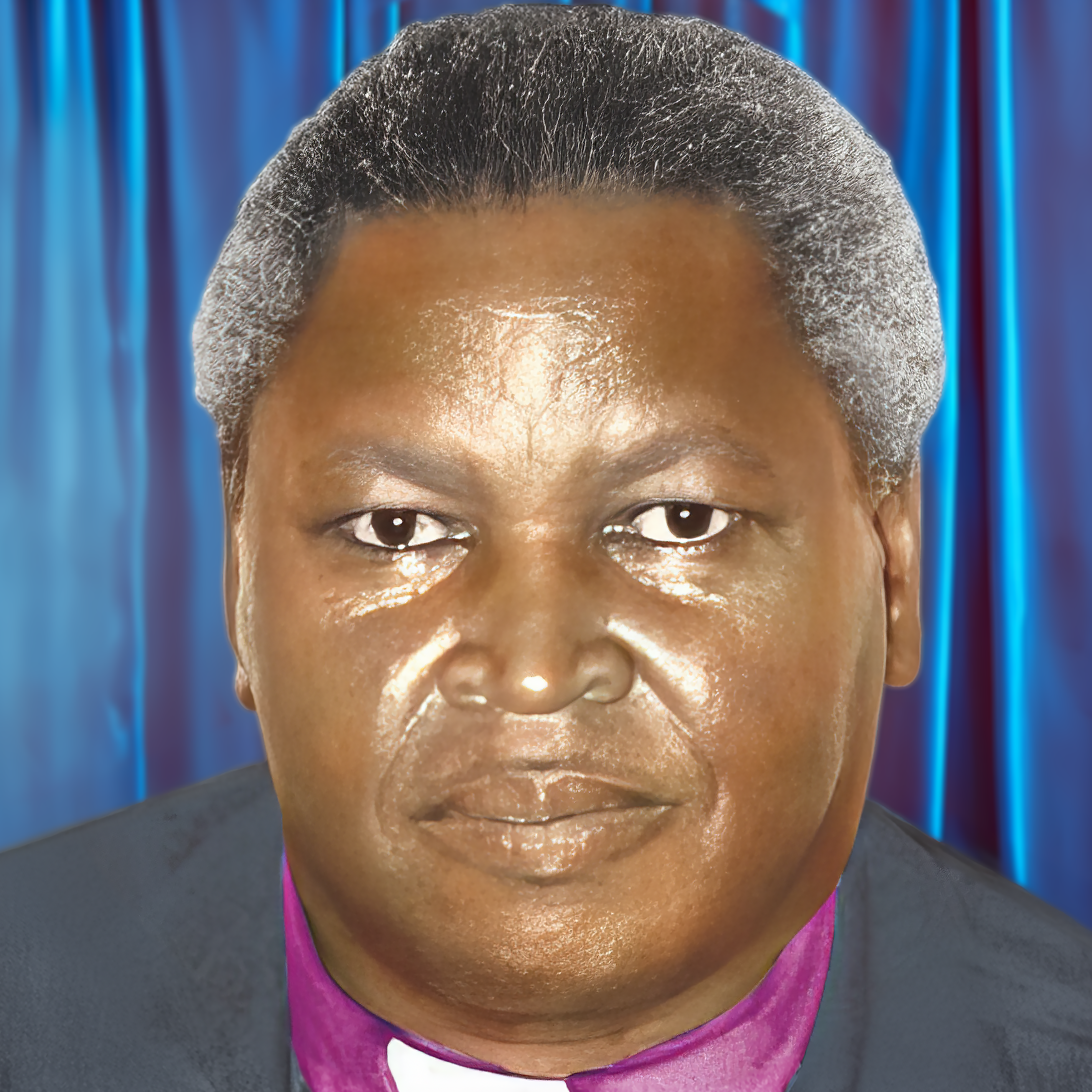
- Manasses Kuria, Second Archbishop of Kenya
- Church: Anglican Church of Kenya
- In office: 1980–1994
- Predecessor: Festo Olang'
- Successor: David Gitari
- Previous posts: Nakuru (asst.); II Nakuru

Orders
- Consecration: 25 April 1970 by Leonard Beecher

Personal details
- Born: 29 July 1929 Nairobi, Colony of Kenya
- Died: 19 September 2005 (aged 76) Nairobi, Republic of Kenya

Manasses Kuria (29 July 1929, in Nairobi – 19 September 2005, in Nairobi) was a Kenyan Anglican archbishop. He was the second African archbishop and bishop of Nairobi in the Anglican Church of Kenya.

== Early life ==
Kuria was brought up by his parents at Kabuku in Limuru, Kiambu District. He first attended St. Paul's School in Limuru in 1933; in 1935 he went to Ngecha School before going to Kabete Mission School in 1938, where he took the Kenya African Preliminary Examination in 1940.

At the age of 16 Kuria began a career in teaching; between 1945 and 1954 he taught at St. Peter's Wangige school, a mission school, Ngecha Junior High School and Rironi Orthodox School.

== Ecclesiastical career ==
After a profound spiritual experience in 1950, Kuria resigned from teaching and took up full-time church work. In January 1954, he enrolled in St. Paul's University, Limuru.

Kuria served as a special chaplain and then as an archdeacon, stationed in Eldoret. On April 25, 1970, he was consecrated assistant bishop of the diocese of Nakuru, by Archbishop Leonard Beecher. In January 1976, he was enthroned Bishop of the diocese of Nakuru by Archbishop Festo Olang'.

On June 29, 1980, Kuria, at the age of 51, became the second African Anglican archbishop of Kenya. By the time he retired in 1994, the number of dioceses in Kenya had increased from seven to twenty.

After retirement, he started Jehovah Jireh Children homes and schools for the education and pastoral care of poor street children.

Kuria's wife, Mary, whom he had married in 1947, died on July 6, 2002, at the age of 73. Kuria died on 19 September 2005, aged 76, in Nairobi after suffering a heart attack. Both of them were cremated at death, which was and still is unusual in their society. They are buried at St. John's Anglican Church, Kabuku in Limuru. Bishop Kuria's brother called Amon Mbugua was a long-time lay reader at St. John's in Kabuku.

== See also ==
- List of archbishops of the Anglican Church of Kenya
- List of bishops of the Anglican Church of Kenya

Anglican Communion titles
Preceded by Festo Olang'	Archbishop of Kenya; 1980–1994	Succeeded by David Gitari
Preceded by Festo Olang'	Bishop of Nairobi; 1980–1994	Succeeded by David Gitari
Preceded by Neville Langford-Smith	Bishop of Nakuru; 1976–1980	Succeeded by Ladan Kamau
