= Benjamin Nzimbi =

Kenyan Anglican archbishop (born 1945)

The Most Reverend Benjamin Nzimbi
- Archbishop and Primate of All Kenya, Bishop of All Saints' Cathedral
- Church: Anglican Church of Kenya
- In office: 2002–2009
- Predecessor: David Gitari
- Successor: Eliud Wabukala
- Previous posts: I Kitui; I Machakos

Orders
- Consecration: 1985 by Festo Olang'

Personal details
- Born: 1945 (age 80–81) Kitui District

Benjamin Paul Mwanzia Nzimbi (born 1945) is a Kenyan Anglican archbishop. He was the archbishop and primate of the Anglican Church of Kenya and Bishop of the Diocese of All Saints Cathedral, from 2002 to 2009. He is married to Alice Kavula and the couple has five children.

== Early life ==
He was born into a poor family of eight children and attended Ithookwe Primary, Mulutu Intermediary and Kitui School. He later attended Kenyatta University, where he obtained a bachelor's degree in Education, with majors in Religion and Kiswahili. Afterward, he worked as a lecturer at Machakos Teachers Training College, where he was dean of students and the head of social studies department. He felt his religious call then, so he was trained and ordained to be the college chaplain.

== Priesthood ==
He finally decided to leave teaching to become a full-time priest. He studied for the priesthood at the Trinity and St. Francis College, in Karen in 1984. Afterwards, Nzimbi was elected as the first bishop of the new Diocese of Machakos, which he served from 1985 to 1995. In 1995 he was elected the first bishop of the newly created Diocese of Kitui. Nzimbi was elected the fourth archbishop and primate of Kenya and Bishop of the Diocese of All Saints Cathedral on 16 August 2002 and served from 2002 to 2009.

He opposed the acceptance of non-celibate gay clergy and the blessing of same-sex unions in the United States and Canada branches of the Anglican Communion, becoming a leading name in the Anglican realignment as a member of the Global South and the Fellowship of Confessing Anglicans. He attended the GAFCON meeting in Jerusalem in 2008 and supported the creation of the Anglican Church in North America in June 2009. He was one of the Anglican Primates that attended the new church inaugural assembly in Bedford, Texas.

== See also ==
- List of archbishops of the Anglican Church of Kenya
- List of bishops of the Anglican Church of Kenya

Anglican Communion titles
Preceded by David Gitari as Archbishop of Kenya and Bishop of Nairobi	Primate and Archbishop of All Kenya; 2002–2009	Succeeded by Eliud Wabukala
New title	Bishop of All Saints' Cathedral; 2002–2009	Succeeded by Eliud Wabukala
New title	Bishop of Kitui; 1995–2002	Succeeded by Josephat Mule
New title	Bishop of Machakos; 1985–1995	Succeeded by Joseph Kanuku
