= Lawrence Dena =

Anglican bishop

Lawrence Dena is an Anglican bishop in Kenya; he is the current Bishop of Malindi.

Dena was born in Rabai. He was educated at the Teachers College in Kericho and the Nairobi International School of Theology. He was ordained in 1994 in Mombasa, and served at St. Augustine Mombasa. In 2003 he became a Canon at All Saints' Cathedral, Nairobi. He was consecrated Assistant Bishop of Bishop of Mombasa in 2005. He was Provincial Secretary to Archbishop Benjamin Nzimbi from 2006 to 2009. He is Chairman of the All Africa Conference of Churches.
