= Francis Matui =

Francis Matui is an Anglican bishop in Kenya: he is the current Bishop of Makueni.

Matui was educated at St Paul's Theological College, Kabare and St. Paul's University, Limuru. He served in the Anglican Diocese of Machakos from 1993 until his episcopal appointment which was in part of that diocese until the 2013 sub-division.
