= Festo Olang' =

Kenyan archbishop (1914–2004)

The Most Reverend Festo Olang’
- Archbishop of Kenya, Bishop of Nairobi
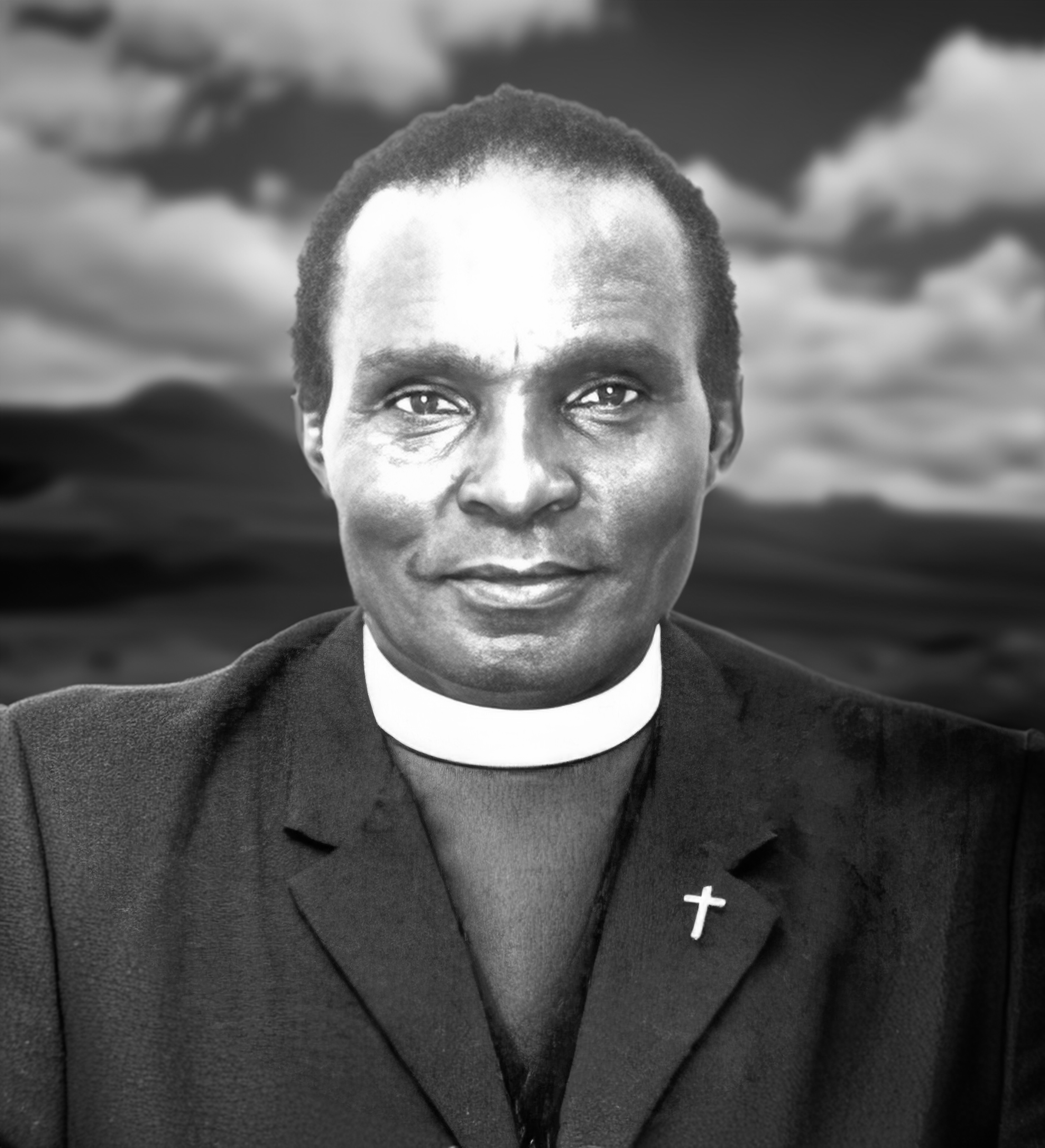
- Festo Olang', First Archbishop of Kenya
- Church: Church of the Province of Kenya
- Elected: 1970
- Installed: 1970
- Retired: 1980
- Predecessor: Leonard Beecher, as Archbishop of East Africa
- Successor: Manasses Kuria
- Previous posts: Mombasa (asst.; suffr.); I Maseno; I Maseno North

Personal details
- Born: c. 1914 Maseno, East Africa Protectorate
- Died: 3 February 2004 (aged 89–90) Nairobi, Republic of Kenya
- Spouse: Eseri Twela (m. 1937; died 1997)
- Children: 12
- Education: St. Paul's Divinity School, Limuru; Wycliffe Hall, University of Oxford

Ordination history
History
Diaconal ordination
- Ordained by: Reginald Crabbe
Priestly ordination
- Ordained by: Reginald Crabbe
Episcopal consecration
- Principal consecrator: Geoffrey Fisher
- Co-consecrators: Oliver Allison, Leonard Beecher, Alfred Stanway, Leslie Brown, Lucian Usher-Wilson, Ebenezer Dimieari, William Baker, Aberi Balya, Jim Brazier, Festo Lutaya, Stephen Tomusange, and Cyril Stuart

Festo Habakkuk Olang' (c. 1914 – 3 February 2004, in Nairobi) was a Kenyan Anglican archbishop. He was born in Ebusakami Esabalu village. In 1925, he began attending Kisumu Primary School, then called Komulo School. In 1927, he sat for the Common Entrance Examination at Maseno School and was admitted in 1928. He studied there for three years but found it quite a traumatic experience to be away from home, having to conform to the school regulations and dress code. However, he was greatly helped and influenced by the headmaster of Maseno School and famous mathematician, Mr. Edward Carey Francis. Olang's faith in Jesus Christ grew and was strengthened under his guidance and, like many of the 300 boys at the school, Olang' taught at Sunday schools in the area each Sunday, after learning how to give the lesson under Mr. Francis's tutelage each week. Olang' taught Luhya speaking groups and was also encouraged to plant trees around the village churches.

== Early life ==
He was born at Ebusakami Esabalu village, Maseno, in south Bunyore, Kakamega District. His father was a polygamist and had four wives. His mother was his father's senior wife and the only to have two surviving sons. Olang' spent his early years in Kano, Kisumu District, where he acquired fluency in Luo and Luhyia. The family later moved to Nyamasaria, in Kano, where his family raised livestock.

He entered Kisumu Primary School, then called Komulo School in 1925.After passing the entry exam in 1927, he was admitted to Maseno School in 1928. His three years of study there were not a pleasant experience, as he was very far from home. He still was influenced by Edward Carey Francis, the headmaster, who helped grow his Christian faith. Under his guidance, he taught Sunday school classes at the area and also encouraged planting trees near the village churches. While at Maseno he was confirmed in the Anglican faith. He spoke English fluently by his third year at the school. He was the only Christian at his family at this point in time. He moved to Alliance High School, in Kikuyu, in 1931, where he stayed until 1935, three years of this at secondary level and the remaining two in teacher training. Olang' returned to Maseno School, where he was a teacher for four years, until January 1940, when he moved to newly started Butere Girls School, by invitation. He married a Christian woman, Eseri Twera, on 24 December 1937.

== Religious career ==
Olang' decided to study to become an Anglican priest, joining St. Paul's Divinity School, in Limuru, in January 1944. He was ordained a deacon on December 9, 1945. He worked as a deacon at the Ramula pastorate, from 1946 to 1947, being able to baptize and confirm his own mother. He returned to Limuru, expecting to complete his Theological training. In 1948, he won a scholarship from the British Council that enabled him to study at Wycliffe Hall, in Oxford, England, from the British Council, for one academic year. He was ordained a priest after his return to Kenya in 1950. He also became the principal of the newly started Maseno Bible School. In 1952 he became the first Kenyan rural dean for Central Nyanza. At the end of 1954, he became vicar of Bunyore.

Olang' and Obadiah Kariuki were consecrated the first two African assistant bishops in Kenya by the Archbishop of Canterbury, Geoffrey Fisher, at Namirembe Cathedral, in Kampala, Uganda, on 15 March 1955. He was in charge of all western Kenya. In December 1960, he was nominated bishop of the Diocese of Maseno, covering Nyanza and Western provinces, being installed in 1961 by Archbishop Leonard Beecher, at St. Stephen's Church, in Kisumu, later his Pro-Cathedral. The growth of his diocese lead to his division into two, with him in charge of the new Diocese of Maseno North. During his tenure in both dioceses, Olang' was the chairman of the Luo and the Oluluyia Bible Translation Committees, helping to translate the Bible, the Prayer Book, and Hymn books into both languages.

== Archbishop of Kenya (1970-1980) ==
Shortly after the division of the province of East Africa in two new provinces, Kenya and Tanzania, Olang' was chosen to be the first African archbishop of the Anglican Church of Kenya and bishop of Nairobi, with his enthronement taking place at All Saints' Cathedral, Nairobi on 3 August 1970, in a ceremony presided by Archbishop Leonard Beecher.Olang' would serve as bishop-in-ordinary for the Armed Forces of Kenya and would held an ecclesiastical court for the discipline of the Kenyan clergy. He worked to strengthen relationships with other members of the worldwide Anglican Communion, visiting several countries on behalf of the Church of the Province of Kenya, such as Great Britain, Germany, Canada, United States and Australia.He also participated several times at Billy Graham's Evangelical Crusades. Olang' hosted the Anglican Consultative Council in Limuru, Kenya, in 1971. He also would organize the Pan-Christian African Assembly in Nairobi, in 1974, and a conference of Anglican bishops from several parts of the world in Trinity College, in Nairobi, in 1975.

Olang' hosted the first meeting of African Anglican bishops, known as "African Lambeth", in 1977, which was the start of the Conference of Anglican Provinces in Africa (CAPA); Olang' was the first chairman of the conference.

He was involved in several ecumenical meetings from the World Council of Churches, the All Africa Conference of Churches and the National Council of Churches of Kenya. He was also a prominent member of the East Africa revival movement. At the time of his retirement, in 1980, the Anglican Church of Kenya had grown to 7 dioceses, 288 parishes and 374 ordained clergy. He was also the main responsible of many developmental projects in Kenya, including schools and hospitals.

== Death ==
He died after a heart attack on 3 February 2004, in Nairobi.

Rev. Alfred Sheunda Keyas wrote that: "He was respected for his humility and did not engage in fighting for positions in the church. He preached peace, love, unity, and humility and hence was a great force in keeping the Anglican Church united during his tenure."

== Works ==
He published: Festo Olang': An Autobiography (1991).

== See also ==
- List of archbishops of the Anglican Church of Kenya
- List of bishops of the Anglican Church of Kenya

Anglican Communion titles
Preceded by Leonard Beecher as Archbishop of East Africa and Bishop of Nairobi	Archbishop of Kenya; 1970–1980	Succeeded by Manasses Kuria
Preceded by Leonard Beecher as Archbishop of East Africa and Bishop of Nairobi	Bishop of Nairobi; 1970–1980	Succeeded by Manasses Kuria
New title	Bishop of Maseno North; 1970	Succeeded by James Mundia
New title	Bishop of Maseno; 1961–1970	Succeeded by Evans Agola as Bishop of Maseno South
