= Eliud Wabukala =

Kenyan Anglican Archbishop (born 1951)

The Most Reverend Eliud Wabukala
- Archbishop and Primate of All Kenya, Bishop of All Saints' Cathedral
- Church: Anglican Church of Kenya
- Predecessor: Benjamin Nzimbi
- Successor: Jackson Ole Sapit
- Previous posts: I Bungoma; Chairman of GAFCON

Orders
- Consecration: 13 October 1996

Personal details
- Born: June 26, 1951 (age 74)
- Spouse: Karen
- Children: 5

Eliud Wamukekhe Wabukala (born in Bungoma West District, 26 June 1951) is a Kenyan Anglican Archbishop notable as a leader in the Anglican realignment. He is Bishop of the Diocese of All Saints Cathedral and the fifth Primate of the Anglican Church of Kenya. The Archbishop was a widower, following the death of his wife in 2010, and has five adult children from his first marriage. He married for the second time at 11 May 2012, in a ceremony that took place in Mombasa.

== Early life and studies ==
He was raised in an Anglican family and as a child he used to walk 10 km daily in both directions to attend Malakisi Primary School. He went on to attend Butonge Primary School and Kolanya High School, where he completed his studies in 1969. Afterwards he worked as an untrained teacher at Butonge Secondary School to help educate his two sisters and five brothers. He started to work as a clerical officer in the Nakuru Provincial Commissioner's office, being promoted to the level of district officer two in Narok. He concluded that this was not his vocation, so he returned to untrained teaching, in Kitale, in 1972. He entered Kaimosi Teachers College to become a qualified teacher, finishing his studies in 1974. Wabukala went to work as a qualified teacher at Naifarm Primary School, in Kitale, being moved to Bungoma afterwards. There he was promoted to Inspector of Schools in charge of the Butonge Zone in Sirisia Division.

== Religious career ==
In 1985, he left his profession to study Theology at the St. Paul's Theological College, in Limuru, finishing his studies in 1988. He still had the obligation to work for the Teachers Service Commission, teaching at the Matulo Secondary School, in Webuye, and at the Nagina Girls High School, in Busia.

In 1990, Wabukala received a scholarship from the Anglican Church of Canada to study at the Wycliffe College at Toronto School of Theology, of the University of Toronto, in Canada, where he became a Doctor of Philosophy in 1994. Returning to Kenya, he was a lecturer at St. Paul's Theological College, in Limuru, where he became academic dean.

Wabukala left office, to be elected the first Bishop of Bungoma on 13 October 1996, remaining in office for the next 12 years. Wabukala was elected Archbishop of Kenya on 24 April 2009, succeeding outgoing Archbishop Benjamin Nzimbi. He was enthroned at All Saints' Cathedral, Nairobi, on 5 July 2009.

He was national vice-chairman of the National Council of Churches of Kenya, from 2000 to 2004, and national chairman from 2004 to 2009.

Wabukala is the serving Chairperson of National Anti Corruption Campaign Steering Committee having been appointed by Mwai Kibaki the President of the Republic of Kenya. He previously served as an NACCSC Committee Member for five years.

Wabukala is a leading name in the Anglican realignment movement, both at the Global South and the Fellowship of Confessing Anglicans, like his predecessor. He was the chairman of GAFCON and as such a supporter of the Anglican Church in North America admission at the Anglican Communion.

Wabukala announced he would retire on 26 June 2016.

== See also ==
- List of archbishops of the Anglican Church of Kenya
- List of bishops of the Anglican Church of Kenya

Anglican Communion titles
Preceded by Benjamin Nzimbi	Primate and Archbishop of All Kenya; 2009–2016	Succeeded by Jackson Ole Sapit
Preceded by Benjamin Nzimbi	Bishop of All Saints' Cathedral; 2009–2016	Succeeded by Jackson Ole Sapit
New title	Bishop of Bungoma; 1996–2009	Succeeded by George Mechumo
