= Julius Kalu =

Kenyan Anglican Bishop

Julius Robert Katoi Kalu is a Kenyan Anglican Bishop. He is the current Bishop of Mombasa, having been consecrated and enthroned on January 2, 1994.

Anglican Communion titles
Preceded by Peter Mwang'ombe	Bishop of Mombasa; 1994–	Succeeded by Current incumbent
