= Obadiah Kariuki =

Obadiah Kariuki (1902–1978) was an Anglican bishop in Kenya during the last third of the twentieth century. [Kenya Gazette]] 10 August 2007

Kariuki was born near Kabete where he attended the CMS school. He was baptized in 1922. He trained as a teacher at Buxton School, Mombasa. He became deputy headmaster of Kiambaa. He then studied at St. Paul's University, Limuru and was ordained in 1940.He served in Nairobi and Murang’a. In 1955 he became Assistant Bishop to Leonard Beecher the Bishop of Mombasa. He was Bishop of Fort Hall from 1961 to 1964; Bishop of Mount Kenya from 1964 to 1975.
