= Diocese of Garissa =

The Diocese of Garissa may refer to:

- Anglican Diocese of Garissa, in the city of Garissa, Kenya
- Roman Catholic Diocese of Garissa, in the city of Garissa, Kenya
