= Vincent Ryan (bishop) =

First Anglican Bishop of Mauritius from 1854–1869

The Right Reverend Vincent Ryan
- Bishop of Mauritius
- Vincent Ryan, First Bishop of Mauritius
- Church: Church of England
- Elected: 1854
- Installed: 30 November 1854
- Retired: 24 February 1869
- Predecessor: New title
- Successor: Thomas Hatchard
- Other posts: Norwich (archdcn.); Ripon (archdcn.; comm.)

Personal details
- Born: 8 December 1816 Collins Barracks, Cork, United Kingdom
- Died: 11 January 1888 (aged 71) Stanhope, Durham, United Kingdom
- Spouse: Elizabeth Dowse (née Atkins) (m. 1840; died 1894)
- Children: 7
- Education: Magdalen Hall, University of Oxford (BA, MA, BD, DD)

Ordination history
History
Diaconal ordination
- Ordained by: Charles Sumner
Priestly ordination
- Ordained by: Charles Sumner
Episcopal consecration
- Principal consecrator: John Bird Sumner
- Co-consecrators: John Lonsdale, John Graham, and George Tomlinson

Vincent William Ryan (18 December 1816 – 11 January 1888) was an Anglican bishop who served as the first Bishop of Mauritius. His work was instrumental in establishing the Anglican Church's presence in the Indian Ocean and East Africa, paving the way for future dioceses in the region.

== Early life and education ==
Vincent William Ryan was born on 18 December 1816 at Collins Barracks, Cork in Ireland. He was the son of John Ryan of the 82nd Regiment and Harriett Gauvain, daughter of Pierre Gauvain, a judge from Alderney. Ryan spent his early childhood in Mauritius, where his father was stationed. After returning to England, he was educated at Gosport before entering Magdalen Hall, Oxford (now Hertford College), in 1838. He graduated with a Bachelor of Arts (B.A.) in 1841 and later earned a Master of Arts (M.A.) in 1848. In 1853, Ryan was awarded both a Bachelor of Divinity (B.D.) and a Doctor of Divinity (D.D.).

== Early Ministry ==
Ryan was ordained as a deacon in 1840 and as a priest in 1842 by Charles Sumner, the Bishop of Winchester. His first clerical position was as curate at St. Anne's Parish in Alderney, where he served from 1840 to 1842, before becoming the incumbent. In 1847, Ryan was appointed curate of Edge Hill, near Liverpool, and vice-principal of the Liverpool Collegiate Institute. In 1850, he became the principal of the Church of England Metropolitan Training Institution at Highbury, London.

== Bishop of Mauritius ==
In 1854, Ryan was appointed the first Bishop of Mauritius, a diocese that included both Mauritius and the Seychelles. His appointment was influenced by his fluency in French and his familiarity with the Indian Ocean region. Ryan was consecrated on 30 November 1854 at Lambeth Palace Chapel by John Bird Sumner, Archbishop of Canterbury, with co-consecrators John Lonsdale, John Graham, and George Tomlinson.

Ryan arrived in Mauritius on 12 June 1855, where he found an Anglican community with limited resources and infrastructure. At the time, there were only two clergymen in Port Louis and one missionary in the rural areas. Ryan quickly expanded the church's presence by consecrating a new church at Mahébourg in January 1856 and making several visits to the Seychelles, where he consecrated another church in 1859. Ryan also focused on education, promoting the establishment of schools across the diocese and advocating for the inclusion of the local Hindu population.

== Missionary Vision and Influence on East Africa ==
Ryan’s vision extended beyond Mauritius. He sought to expand Anglicanism into the East African mainland. In 1862, Ryan visited Madagascar with a British special commissioner aboard HMS Gorgon to explore the possibility of establishing a new mission there. Although his health deteriorated during the visit, forcing his return to Mauritius, his efforts highlighted the strategic importance of the region for Anglican expansion.

While Ryan did not directly establish dioceses in East Africa, his work in Mauritius and advocacy for missionary expansion laid the foundation for future developments. The Diocese of Mauritius under Ryan's leadership became a significant Anglican jurisdiction, influencing the later creation of the Diocese of Eastern Equatorial Africa in 1884 and later Diocese of Mombasa, which eventually led to the establishment of the Anglican Church of Kenya and the Anglican Church of Tanzania. His work also paved the way for the Church of the Province of the Indian Ocean.

== Return to England and Later Life ==
After thirteen years in Mauritius, Ryan returned to England in 1867 due to declining health. He was appointed Archdeacon of Suffolk, but soon became rector of St. Nicholas, Guildford, and commissary to the Bishop of Winchester. In May 1870, Ryan was transferred to the vicarage of Bradford, Yorkshire, where he served for ten years. During his tenure, he was appointed rural dean from 1870 to 1876 and became Archdeacon of Craven and commissary to the Bishop of Ripon in 1875. In 1880, Ryan became vicar of St. Peter’s, Bournemouth, and the following year, rector of Middleham, North Yorkshire.

In 1883, Ryan was appointed rector of Stanhope, County Durham, where he remained until his death on 11 January 1888.

== Personal life ==
Vincent William Ryan married Elizabeth Dowse (née Atkins) in 1840. The couple had seven children. Only a daughter and two sons survived into adulthood. Both sons, Vincent John Ryan and Alfred Thomas Ryan, followed their father into holy orders.

== Publications ==
- Lectures on Amos (1850)
- The Communion of Saints: A Series of Sermons (1854)
- Mauritius and Madagascar: Journals of an Eight Years' Residence in the Diocese of Mauritius, and of a Visit to Madagascar (1864)

Anglican Communion titles
| New title | Bishop of Mauritius; 1854–1869, 1872 | Succeeded by Thomas Hatchard |
