= H. Daudi Mokinyo =

Maasai clergyman

Reverend Daudi Mokinyo
- A.C.K Reverend
- Reverend Mokinyo in 1975
- Installed: 1941
- Term ended: 1978
- Successor: Rev. Major Paul Ole Lantei; Rev. John Sakaya; Rev. Joseph Ole Kasio; Rev. Joseph Ole Leboo; Rev. Ole Sankok

Orders
- Ordination: 1951

Personal details
- Born: Haron Daudi Mokinyo; 1912 Loita, Kenya
- Died: 19 July 1982 (aged 70) Esambu-Kike Kajiado
- Denomination: Anglican Church
- Residence: Essampokike-Iloodokilani, Kajiado Central, Kajiado county
- Spouse: Apofia Mutel, Married in 1943
- Children: Israel Lemayian Mokinyo; Mary Osoi Mokinyo; Philip Tatayia Mokinyo; Theophilus Oshumu Mokinyo; Bezaliel Parori Mokinyo; Jemima Repeson Mokinyo; Phoebe Katimua Mollel.
- Occupation: Clergyman, Pastor, educator, evangelist, activist
- Signature: Daudi Mokinyo's signature

Haron Daudi Mokinyo ole Loolpisia (1912 – 19 July 1982) was the first Maasai clergyman of the Anglican Church of Kenya, ordained in 1951 in All Saints' Cathedral, Nairobi. He was also the first Maasai to own a ranch during the colonial period in 1950. He owned a 4,000-acre ranch called Oloisur, which was located near Toroka station on the Magadi branch railway. His ranch was home to over 200 exotic breeds of cows.

== Family ==
Haron Daudi Mokinyo Loolpisia was born in Loita in 1912. He was born in a family of four children. He has one brother and two sisters.

== Education and career ==
Mokinyo went to Narok School in Narok in 1926. At that time, parents of the students were giving out cows to the school to provide milk. His father went to school to be with him due to his young age. Eventually, the school employed Daudi's father as a casual worker, where he learned how to read and write. In 1952, Reverend Daudi attended a Divinity school in Limuru, today known as Limuru School of Theology. While in divinity school, Reverend Mokinyo worked with Reverend Manasses Kuria for one year. In 1951, he was ordained as a deacon at All Saints' Cathedral, Nairobi. He was posted to Emmanuel Church in Kajiado. He went back to college after one year and graduated in 1954, after which he was ordained in 1955 at Emmanuel church.

== Career ==
After completing school, he started working in Kajiado as a veterinary officer, while at the same time, he preached in the evenings. His favorite spot was on a rock close to the present Kajiado railway station. Later on, this was the place where the first church made out of grass was built. After a while of working and preaching, he was called to preach in Nairobi, so he stopped working for the government and started working for God. Rev. Mokinyo took the train to Konza, Kenya, and walked to Nairobi from there while spreading and teaching the word of God. Upon arriving in Nairobi, he was employed as a preacher and was given the mandate to oversee preaching in Maasai land and part of Kambaland. He had to walk on foot in the Maasai land and Kambaland, spreading the word. After working there for some time, he was posted to Thika for three years. After that, he was sent back to work in Nairobi in 1944. He worked in Pumwani under Reverend Pitway of Nairobi diocese and Mr. Colonel Elijah Gachanja. In 1943, Reverend Daudi was sent to Maasai land because there was no preacher over there due to the high number of lions and water shortage.

== Bringing change and Christianity to Maasai land ==
Reverend Mokinyo built the first church in Kajiado around 1944: the church was located next to the present-day Maasai Store (Shopping centre in Kajiado). During this time, the construction of Emanuel church was underway as he continued spreading the gospel. He got an offer from the D.C. to become the Maasai District Officer, but turned it down because he was already dedicated to working for God. Reverend Mokinyo was offered some other work opportunities while he spread the Gospel, jobs such as a Maasai store clerk and working for Kenya Marble Quarry(KMQ) company, but he also turned them down for the same reason. Additionally, in 1952, the Magadi Soda Company gave him a permit to transport firewood and sand. However, he delegated the job to his brother, Mr Maora, who worked with around 300 men, most of them from the tribe of Watende in Tanzania and the Kamba from Kenya. Mr. Maora went on to become a headman in his work field, then later he became chief, and afterwards the Paramount Chief.

In 1957, he acquired a farm in Maasai land (Loodokilani). Apart from the scarcity of water, the place was also known for the high number of lions. However, he concurred this and other challenges and went on to drill the first motorised borehole in Kajiado and Narok Districts. The commencement of the borehole's operation was marked by a great fest, where the attendees ate meat and drank refreshments. The ceremony was attended by the European D.C., Chief Nititoyian Ole Sayianka, the headmaster of REB school (now known as Ol-Kejuado High School), the students, and Mr. Wiliam Ole Ndimama. Reverend Mokinyo is still remembered to date for the massive milk distribution industry that he had in Kajiado. He introduced the Sahiwal cattle in Maasai Land in 1956 and crossbred them with Freshian cattle to increase milk production, which enabled him to solely supply milk to Ol-Kejuado High School, Kajiado District Hospital, and individual customers. After some time, he built a dip for his cattle and piped water to his home, which was around six km from his borehole. The reverend continued evangelising and overseeing evangelism in Kajiado District, some parts of Machakos District (Ukea, Kilome), as well as the border between the Kamba and the Maasai tribe. During this period, he worked with Bishop Leonard Bencheer. The coming of the Anglican church from England coincided with the period when the reverend was very active at work, Isinya centre was among the first to receive aid from Queen Elizabeth II. Later on, with his help, the church spread throughout Maasai land to places like Okiramatia, Olitasika, Torosei and Meto. In 1965, he started working with Reverend John T. Mpaayei, some Samburu elders, and some Tanzanians from Arusha to translate the Bible into Maa (Maasai language). However, he died before the translation was complete.

== Highlights ==
While working in the Kajiado office as a veterinary assistant, he and his colleagues went to Esokota (a small town deep in Maasai land) for work and were attacked by lions. He speared the lion, but it locked jaws on his hand. His colleagues sought help from the DC's office, who came to his rescue and killed the lion, which had hurt him badly. The journey from Konza to Nairobi was not very smooth; he recalls the burning hunger and the scorching sun. He said that he sat next to the railway line under a tree; he took a loaf of bread and some water and continued with the journey. While he was rearing his Sahiwal cattle at the Oletepesi ranch in 1956, he managed to legally acquire a gun, and at one point the lions around his home were terrorising the locals, such that no one was able to walk around at 3 pm; the lions killed cattle all the time. Therefore, he shot dead four lions, and the rest fled. The news about the dead lions did not go so well with the assistant game warden, who confiscated his weapons. However, he later won the case in a Ngong court, and his weapons were given back to him, and he was highly praised by the Maasai people as a brave person and was nicknamed Pastor Daudi, the Lion of Judah.

== Final days ==
In 1980, the reverend took all his family to a spot about 100 yards from his home, where he would be buried when he died; he said that he chose that place because it was not very rocky, and he did not want to give his family a lot of work digging his grave. He also demanded that he should be buried without a coffin, quoting the Bible verse Ecclesiastes 3:20, "All are of the dust, and all turn to dust again". However, he was later convinced that a coffin must be used; he agreed but instructed that the coffin must be open. The reverend died on 19th July 1982 due to chest complications.
