= Gadiel Lenini =

Anglican bishop

Gadiel Katanga Lenini is an Anglican bishop in Kenya: He is the current Bishop of Kajiado.

Elected on 26 November 2011, the Rev. Dr. Gadiel Katanga Lenini took over from Rt. Rev. John Mutua Taama (who was consecrated on 3 August 1997.) having served the diocese of Kajiado for 14 years. Bishop Gadiel is a graduate of St. Paul's University Limuru with Divinity, and currently holds an honorarium Doctorate from ANCCI University based in Texas. He is married to Emily Katanga and blessed with three children.
