= Samson Mwaluda =

Retired Kenyan Anglican bishop

Samson Mwaluda is a retired Kenyan Anglican bishop. He served as Bishop of Taita–Taveta for 23 years.

Mwaluda was educated at Oak Hill College and the Trinity School for Ministry. Since retiring as a diocesan bishop he has been Director of GAFCON Bishops Training Institute.
