= Leonard Beecher =

Anglican archbishop (1906–1987)

The Most Reverend Leonard Beecher CMG, ARCS, FRAI
- Archbishop of East Africa, Bishop of Nairobi
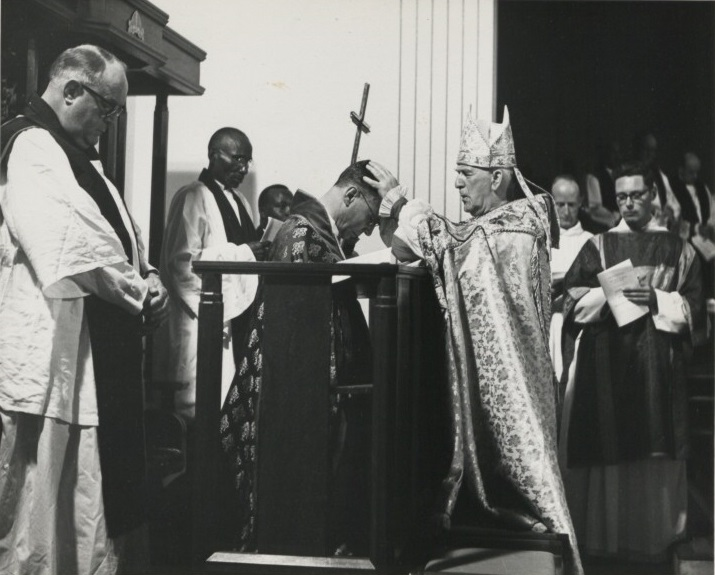
- Beecher being blessed by Geoffrey Fisher, Archbishop of Canterbury, after having been installed the first Archbishop of East Africa in 1960, at St Alban's Church, Dar es Salaam
- Church: Church of the Province of East Africa
- Elected: 7 April 1960
- Installed: 3 August 1960
- Retired: 3 August 1970
- Predecessor: Reginald Crabbe, as Bishop of Mombasa
- Successor: Festo Olang', as Archbishop of Kenya; John Sepeku, as Archbishop of Tanzania
- Previous posts: Mombasa (asst.); IV Mombasa

Personal details
- Born: 21 May 1906 Deptford, London, United Kingdom
- Died: 16 December 1987 (aged 81) Nairobi, Republic of Kenya
- Spouse: Gladys Sybil Bazett Leakey (m. 1930; died 1982)
- Children: 3
- Education: Imperial College, University of London (BSc, MA); London Day Training College, University of London (Teacher's Certificate); Lambeth Degree (DD)

Ordination history
History
Diaconal ordination
- Ordained by: Richard Heywood
Priestly ordination
- Ordained by: Richard Heywood
Episcopal consecration
- Principal consecrator: Geoffrey Fisher
- Co-consecrators: William Wand, Edward Woods, Christopher Chavasse, Bertram Simpson, John Jones, Hugh Gough, George Ingle, Richard Heywood; John Willis; George Wright; William Stanton Jones, and John Mann.

Leonard James Beecher CMG, ARCS, FRAI (21 May 1906 – 16 December 1987) was an English-born Anglican archbishop. He was the first archbishop of the Province of East Africa, comprising Kenya and Tanzania, from 1960 to 1970.

== Education and training ==
He was educated at St. Olave's Grammar School and Imperial College London, ordained deacon in 1929 and priest in 1931. He became an Associate of the Royal College of Science (ARCS) in 1926 and made a Fellow of the Royal Anthropological Institute (FRAI) in 1928.

== Ministry in East Africa ==
He was a missionary of the Church Mission Society in the Diocese of Mombasa from 1930, working in the Highlands. He was appointed Archdeacon of Mombasa and a Canon (both 1945–1953). As archdeacon, Beecher played a prominent role as head of a government education committee that produced a ten-year education plan for Kenya Colony. The "Beecher Report" of 1949 pushed for gender equality in education but was also criticised due to frequency of high-stakes testing, prohibitive school fees, and allowing continued church management of many schools.

Beecher was consecrated a bishop on St. James's Day 1950 (25 July) by Geoffrey Fisher, Archbishop of Canterbury, at St Paul's Cathedral in London. Beecher then became Assistant Bishop of Mombasa before later being appointed bishop diocesan of Mombasa in 1953. He additionally served as Archbishop of the Anglican Province of East Africa, from 1960 to 1970: he was elected (by the House of Bishops of the province-to-be) to serve as the first archbishop in April 1960 and installed by Geoffrey Fisher, Archbishop of Canterbury, at the new province's inauguration service on 3 August 1960 at Dar-es-Salaam.

== Later life ==
A prominent member of the Royal African Society, he retired in 1970 and died on 16 December 1987. He is buried in the cemetery at All Saints, Limuru.

== See also ==
- List of archbishops of the Province of East Africa
- List of bishops of the Anglican Church of Kenya

Anglican Communion titles
New title	Archbishop of East Africa; 1960–1970	Succeeded by Festo Olang' as Archbishop of Kenya
New title	Archbishop of East Africa; 1960–1970	Succeeded by John Sepeku as Archbishop of Tanzania
New title	Bishop of Nairobi; 1964–1970	Succeeded by Festo Olang'
Preceded by Reginald Crabbe	Bishop of Mombasa; 1953–1964	Succeeded by Peter Mwang'ombe
