= Peter Njoka =

Anglican bishop in Kenya

Peter Njoka was the Anglican bishop of Nairobi in Kenya. His name was linked to a corruption scandal.
