= Liverson Mng'onda =

Anglican bishop of Liverson Mgn'onda in Kenya,

Liverson Mng'onda is an Anglican bishop in Kenya who is the currently serving as the Bishop of Taita–Taveta Diocese.
