= Anglican Diocese of Garissa =

Anglican diocese in Kenya

Coordinates: 0°27′25″S 39°39′30″E

The Anglican Diocese of Garissa is an Anglican See in the Anglican Church of Kenya: the current bishop is the Rt Revd David Mutisya.
