= Joseph Kanuku =

Anglican bishop in Kenya

Joseph Kanuku is a retired Anglican bishop in Kenya: he was Bishop of Machakos from 1995 to 2013, and of Makueni from 2013 to 2016.
