= Josephat Mule =

Josephat Mule is an Anglican bishop in Kenya: he is the current Bishop of Kitui.
