= Jeremiah Taama =

Anglican bishop

Jeremiah Taama, MBS is a retired Anglican bishop: he served as Bishop of Taita–Taveta from 1997 to 2011.

Mwaluda was educated at Oak Hill College and the Trinity School for Ministry. Since retiring as a diocesan he has been Director of GAFCON Bishops Training Institute.
