= Crispus Nzano =

20th century Kenyan Anglican bishop

Crispus Nzano (died 2008) was a Kenyan Anglican bishop in the second half of the twentieth century: he became Coadjutor Bishop of Mombasa in 1980; and was subsequently its Diocesan until his retirement in 1993.
