= David Mutisya =

Kenyan bishop

David Mutisya has been the Anglican missionary bishop of Garissa since 2018.

Mutisya was educated at the High School in Mutito; St. Paul's University, Limuru, Limuru; Trinity College, Bristol; and Nashotah House. He was a teacher for seven years before becoming a priest.
