= Anglican dioceses of Mombasa =

Dioceses of the Anglican Church of Kenya

The Anglican dioceses of Mombasa are the Anglican presence in and around Mombasa and south-east Kenya; they are part of the Anglican Church of Kenya. The remaining dioceses of the Church are in the areas of Maseno, of Mount Kenya, and of Nakuru.

== Diocese of Mombasa ==
Diocese of Mombasa
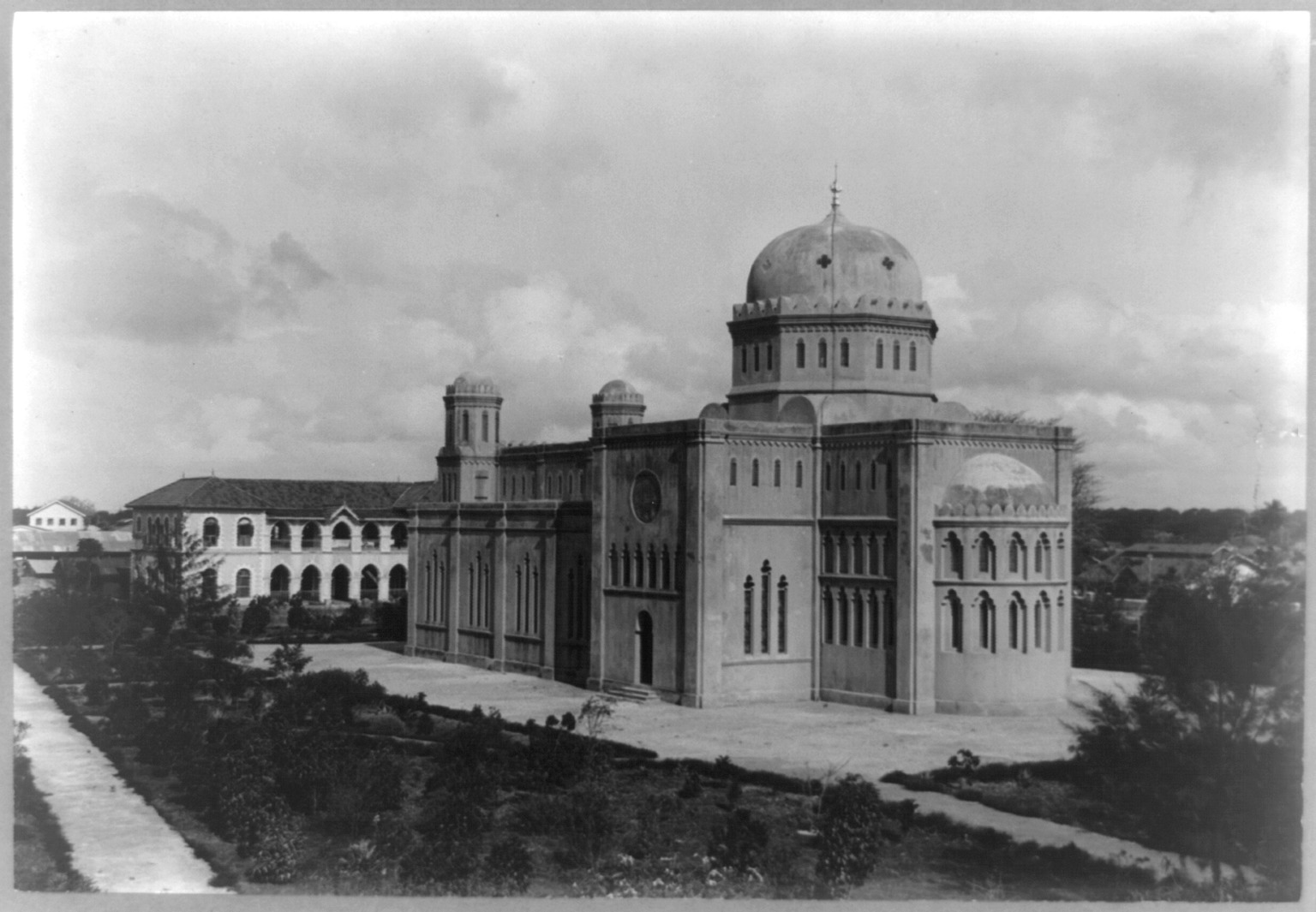
- Memorial Cathedral

Location
- Country: Kenya
- Ecclesiastical province: Anglican Church of Kenya
- Headquarters: Mombasa

Information
- Denomination: Anglican Church
- Established: 1898
- Cathedral: Mombasa Memorial Cathedral; All Saints' Cathedral, Nairobi (1924–1964)
- Language: English, Kiswahili

Current leadership
- Bishop: Alphonse Baya Mwaro

Website
- https://ackmombasadiocese.org/en/

Mombasa is the oldest Kenyan diocese; it was erected from the Diocese of Eastern Equatorial Africa (which at that point covered all Uganda, Kenya and Tanganyika) in 1898. Following the addition of the territory around Kavirondo (approximately the territory of the 1961 Maseno diocese) in 1921 and the splitting of its area of northern Tanganyika in 1972, the Diocese of Mombasa comprised (only) all Kenya.

=== Bishops of Mombasa ===
- 1899–1916: William Peel (died in office)
- 1918–1936: Richard Heywood (later assistant bishop of Coventry 1937–1952)
- 1936–1953: Reginald Crabbe
- 1953–1964: Leonard Beecher (previously assistant bishop 1950–1953; also Archbishop of East Africa 1960–70; later Bishop of Nairobi 1964–1970)
  - 1955–1961: Festo Olang', assistant bishop; suffragan for Western Kenya (Nyanza Province) from 1957; became first Bishop of Maseno
  - 1955–1961: Obadiah Kariuki, assistant bishop; suffragan for Central and Eastern Kenya (Central Province) from 1957; became first Bishop of Fort Hall
  - 1960–1961: Neville Langford-Smith, assistant bishop, suffragan (consecrated St Bartholomew's Day (24 August) 1960, All Saints' Cathedral, Nairobi, by Beecher); became first Bishop of Nakuru (Rift Valley Province)
- 1964–1981: Peter Mwang'ombe (resigned)
- 1981–?: Crispus Nzano, previously assistant bishop
- 1994–2015: Julius Kalu
  - ?–2015: Lawrence Dena, assistant Bishop (former Provincial Secretary, 2006–2009)
- 2018–Present: Alphonse Baya Mwaro

== Diocese of Nairobi ==
Diocese of Nairobi
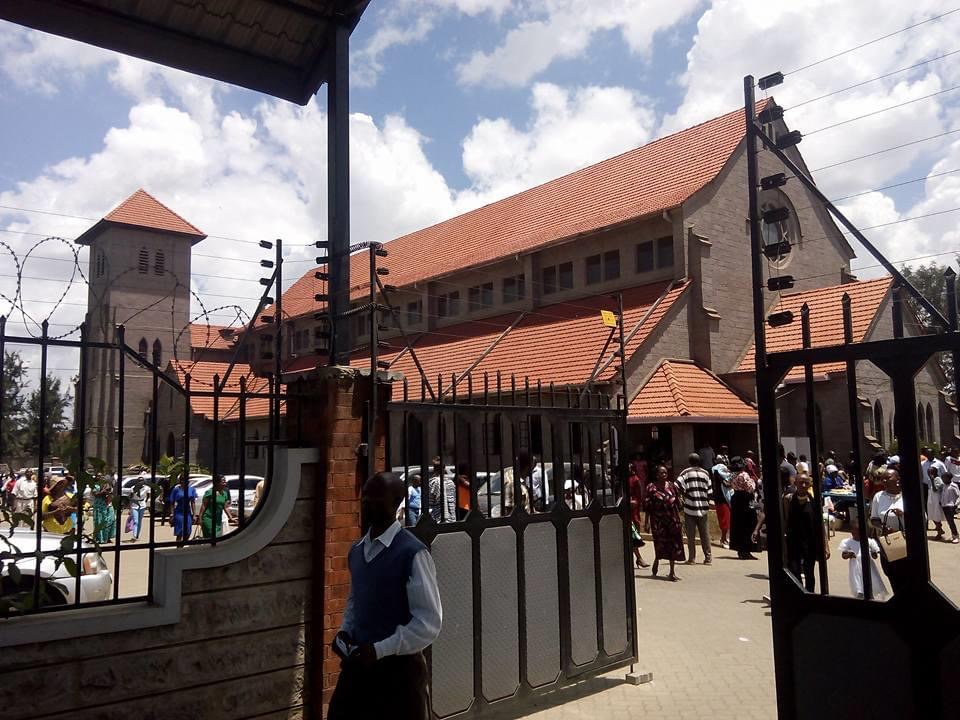
- St. Stephen's Cathedral in Nairobi

Location
- Ecclesiastical province: Anglican Church of Kenya

Information
- Established: 1964
- Cathedral: St Stephen's Cathedral, Nairobi (2002–present); All Saints' Cathedral, Nairobi (1964–2002)

Current leadership
- Bishop: Joel Waweru

Website
- http://ACKNairobiDiocese.org

Founded from Mombasa diocese in 1964, the Nairobi diocese was the See of the Archbishop of Kenya from the independence of the Kenyan church in 1970 until the independent All Saints' Cathedral diocese took that role in 2002. The Diocese has been split three times: to erect Machakos diocese in 1985, the Diocese of Kajiado in 1993 and All Saints' Cathedral diocese in 2002. Until 2002, Nairobi diocese's cathedral was All Saints' Cathedral, Nairobi; since that cathedral became the seat of the new All Saints' Cathedral diocese, St Stephen's Cathedral, Nairobi, has served as the new cathedral.

=== Bishops of Nairobi, Archbishops of Kenya ===
- 1970–1980: Festo Olang'
- 1980–1994: Manasses Kuria
- 1997–2002: David Gitari

=== Bishops of Nairobi ===
- 1964–1970: Leonard Beecher, Archbishop of East Africa
- 2002–2010: Peter Njoka
- 2010–present: Joel Waweru

== Diocese of Machakos ==
Diocese of Machakos

Location
- Ecclesiastical province: Anglican Church of Kenya

Information
- Established: 1985
- Cathedral: All Souls' Cathedral, Machakos (1992–present)

Current leadership
- Bishop: Joseph Mutungi

The Diocese of Machakos was erected from Nairobi diocese in 1985 and was itself split to create Kitui diocese in 1995, Garissa in 2007 and Makueni in 2013. Since 1992, the cathedral has been All Souls' Cathedral, Machakos.

=== Bishops of Machakos ===
- 1985–1995: Benjamin Nzimbi (afterwards first Bishop of Kitui, then Primate—Archbishop)
- 1995–2013: Joseph Kanuku
- 2013–present: Joseph Mutungi

== Diocese of Taita–Taveta ==
Diocese of Taita–Taveta

Location
- Ecclesiastical province: Anglican Church of Kenya

Information
- Established: 1993
- Cathedral: St John's Pro-Cathedral, Voi

Current leadership
- Bishop: Liverson Mng'onda

Website
- http://ACKttvt.org

On 1 July 1993, the Diocese of Taita–Taveta — named for Taita–Taveta County — was carved from the then very large Mombasa diocese. The diocese has not been split; it has a pro-cathedral at Voi, the county's largest town (though not its capital).

=== Bishops of Taita–Taveta ===
- 1993–2016: Samson Mwaluda
- 2016–present: Liverson Mng'onda (previously coadjutor bishop)

== Diocese of Kajiado ==
Diocese of Kajiado

Location
- Ecclesiastical province: Anglican Church of Kenya

Information
- Established: 1993
- Cathedral: Emmanuel Pro-Cathedral, Kajiado

Current leadership
- Bishop: Gadiel Lenini

Formed from Nairobi diocese in 1993, the Diocese of Kajiado now has a pro-cathedral at Emmanuel Pro-Cathedral, Kajiado.

=== Bishops of Kajiado ===
- 1997–2012: Jeremiah Taama
- 2012–present: Gadiel Lenini

== Diocese of Kitui ==
Diocese of Kitui

Location
- Ecclesiastical province: Anglican Church of Kenya

Information
- Established: 1995
- Cathedral: St Martin's Cathedral, Kitui

Current leadership
- Bishop: Josephat Mule

The Diocese of Kitui was erected from Machakos diocese on 1 April 1995 and covers the former Kitui and Mwingi Districts — that is, the present Kitui County.

=== Bishops of Kitui ===
- 1995–2002: Benjamin Nzimbi (previously first Bishop of Machakos, afterwards Primate—Archbishop)
- 2002–present: Josephat Mule

== All Saints' Cathedral Diocese ==
Diocese of All Saints' Cathedral

Location
- Ecclesiastical province: Anglican Church of Kenya

Information
- Established: 2002
- Cathedral: All Saints' Cathedral, Nairobi

Current leadership
- Bishop: Ole Sapit

Website
- http://AllSaintsCathedralDiocese.org

From 1964 until 2002, the Archbishop of Kenya had their See at All Saints' Cathedral, Nairobi as ex officio Bishop of Nairobi (diocesan bishop of the above Diocese of Nairobi). From 2000, the ACK Provincial Synod and Nairobi diocese entered formal discussions to create a new arrangement for the archbishop's See; a very small new diocese was carved from Nairobi diocese, around All Saints' Cathedral itself. The remaining Nairobi diocese now elects her own bishop, who is not the archbishop; while the new See — very unusually, not named for a place or area but for its own cathedral — of All Saints' Cathedral is held ex officio by the Primate and Archbishop of All Kenya. The diocese has two archdeaconries and twelve parishes. As the archbishop's diocese, the bishops in charge of Missionary Areas (i.e. proto-dioceses) are consecrated suffragans in this diocese (regardless of the diocese which their territory belongs to) until their own diocesan See's erection.

=== Bishops of All Saints' Cathedral, Primates and Archbishops of All Kenya ===
- 2002–2009: Benjamin Nzimbi
  - 2008–2011: Rob Martin, suffragan for Marsabit Mission Area (became diocesan Bishop of Marsabit)
- 2009–2016: Eliud Wabukala
- 2016–present: Ole Sapit
  - David Mutisya, missionary Bishop of Garissa
  - Bill Atwood, suffragan (became diocesan bishop of the International Diocese of the Anglican Church in North America)
  - Cleti Ogeto, missionary Bishop of Lodwar

== Diocese of Garissa ==
Diocese of Garissa

Location
- Ecclesiastical province: Anglican Church of Kenya

Information
- Established: 2007

Current leadership
- Bishop: David Mutisya

Garissa diocese was created from territory of Machakos diocese in 2007. Also called a missionary area, Mutisya is or was a suffragan of the archbishop, in All Saints' Cathedral diocese. The first and so far only Bishop of Garissa, since 2007, is David Mutisya.

== Military Episcopate ==
Episcopate of the Armed Forces

Location
- Ecclesiastical province: Anglican Church of Kenya

Information
- Established: 2009
- Cathedral: St Paul's Garrison Church, Kahawa (Pro-Cathedral)

Current leadership
- Bishop: Peter Simiyu

In November 2009, the Anglican Chaplaincy to the Kenyan Armed Forces was raised into a diocese (ordinariate). It is headquartered at the Garrison Church of St Paul at Kahawa Barracks outside Nairobi.

=== Bishops for the Armed Forces ===
From 2007, Simiyu was the first and only Bishop suffragan to the Armed Forces (presumably suffragan to the Primate possibly to the Bishop of Nairobi).

- 2009–present: Peter Simiyu

== Diocese of Makueni ==
Diocese of Makueni

Location
- Ecclesiastical province: Anglican Church of Kenya

Information
- Established: 2013

Current leadership
- Bishop: Francis Matui

The Diocese of Makueni was erected from Machakos diocese in 2013, and Joseph Kanuku, Bishop of Machakos, moved to the new See, becoming first Bishop of Makueni.

=== Bishops of Makueni ===
- 2013–2016: Joseph Kanuku (previously Bishop of Machakos)
- 2016–present: Francis Matui

== Diocese of Malindi ==
Diocese of Malindi

Location
- Ecclesiastical province: Anglican Church of Kenya

Information
- Established: 2015
- Cathedral: St Mary's Pro-Cathedral, Malindi

Current leadership
- Bishop: Lawrence Dena

Malindi diocese was erected from the Diocese of Mombasa in 2015. The first bishop, since 2015, is Lawrence Dena, previously assistant bishop of Mombasa, and former Provincial Secretary. The diocesan pro-cathedral is St Mary's Pro-Cathedral, Malindi.
