= Henry Huxtable =

Bishop of Mauritius from November 1870 to July 1871

The Right Reverend Henry Constantine Huxtable
- Bishop of Mauritius
- Church: Anglican Church
- Diocese: Mauritius
- In office: November 1870 – June 1871
- Previous posts: Missionary in Sawyerpuram, Tuticorin, Tamil Nadu; Curate at Hendford, Yeovil; Rector of Bettiscombe, Somerset

Personal details
- Born: March 8, 1826 Bristol, England
- Died: 18 June 1871 Port Louis, Mauritius
- Spouse: Eliza Amier
- Children: Henry Anthony (son)
- Education: King's College London

Henry Constantine Huxtable (8 March 1826 – 18 June 1871) was Bishop of Mauritius from November 1870 to July 1871.

He was the son of surgeon Anthony Huxtable and his wife Mary Gooding, and was born 8 March 1826 at 3 King's Square, Bristol, England. He was educated at King's College London and served as a missionary in Sawyerpuram, Tuticorin, Tamil Nadu.

In 1849 he married Eliza Amier at Bishop's Tawton in Devon. They were in Madras in 1852 when their son Henry Anthony was born. The family returned to England after the 1857 mutiny and Huxtable became curate in sole charge of Hendford, Yeovil for two years, followed by eight years as Rector of Bettiscombe, Somerset. He was appointed to be ordained and consecrated Bishop of the See of Mauritius by Queen Victoria on 19 November 1870.

Huxtable died in Port Louis, Mauritius. on 18 June 1871. There is a memorial at St Bartholomew's Churchyard, Sutton Waldron, Dorset remembering the Bishop. Eliza then returned to live in England with her son, who became a solicitor and mayor of Dorchester.

Church of England titles
Preceded by Thomas Hatchard	Bishop of Mauritius; 1870–1871	Succeeded by Peter Royston
