= Bishop of Mauritius =

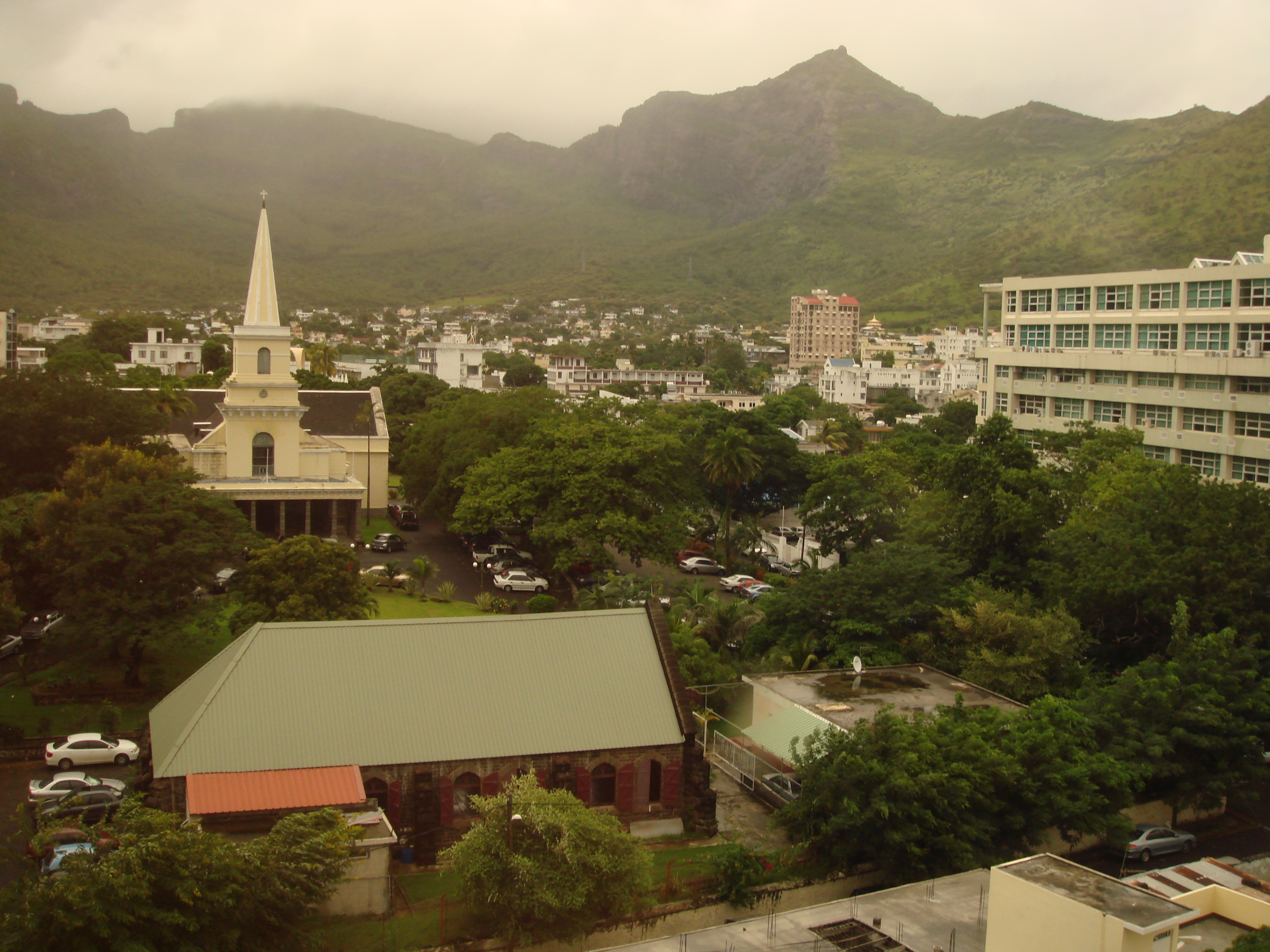
St James Cathedral in Port Louis, Mauritius.

The Bishop of Mauritius (French: Évêque de Maurice) has been the Ordinary of the Anglican Church in Mauritius in the Indian Ocean since its inception in 1854. The current bishop is Joseph Sténio André.

== Bishops ==
- 1854 Vincent William Ryan
- 1869 Thomas Goodwin Hatchard
- 1870 Henry Constantine Huxtable
- 1872 Peter Sorenson Royston
- 1891 William Walsh
- 1898–1903 Walter Ruthven Pym
- 1904 Francis Gregory
- 1919 Cyril Golding-Bird
- 1931 Hugh Otter-Barry
- 1959 Alan Rogers
- 1966 Edwin Curtis
- 1976 Ghislain Emmanuel
- 1978 Trevor Huddleston
- 1984 Rex Donat
- 2001 Ian Ernest
- 2020 Joseph Sténio André
