= Peter Royston (bishop) =

The Rt Rev Peter Sorenson Royston (6 June 1830 – 28 January 1915) was a Bishop of Mauritius.

Born in London on 6 June 1830 and educated at St Paul's and Trinity College, Cambridge, he was ordained in 1853 and began his career as a Resident Tutor at the Church Missionary College in London. After that he was the incumbent of the CMS Chapel, Madras and then of St Thomas', Mauritius. He was Bishop of the country from 1872 to 1891 when he resigned through ill health. Afterwards, an Assistant Bishop within the Diocese of Liverpool he died on 28 January 1915 at Worthing.

== Notes ==
Church of England titles
Preceded by Henry Constantine Huxtable	Bishop of Mauritius; 1872–1891	Succeeded by William Walsh
