= Geoffrey Fisher =

Archbishop of Canterbury from 1945 to 1961

The Most Reverend and Right Honourable Geoffrey Fisher GCVO PC
- Archbishop of Canterbury
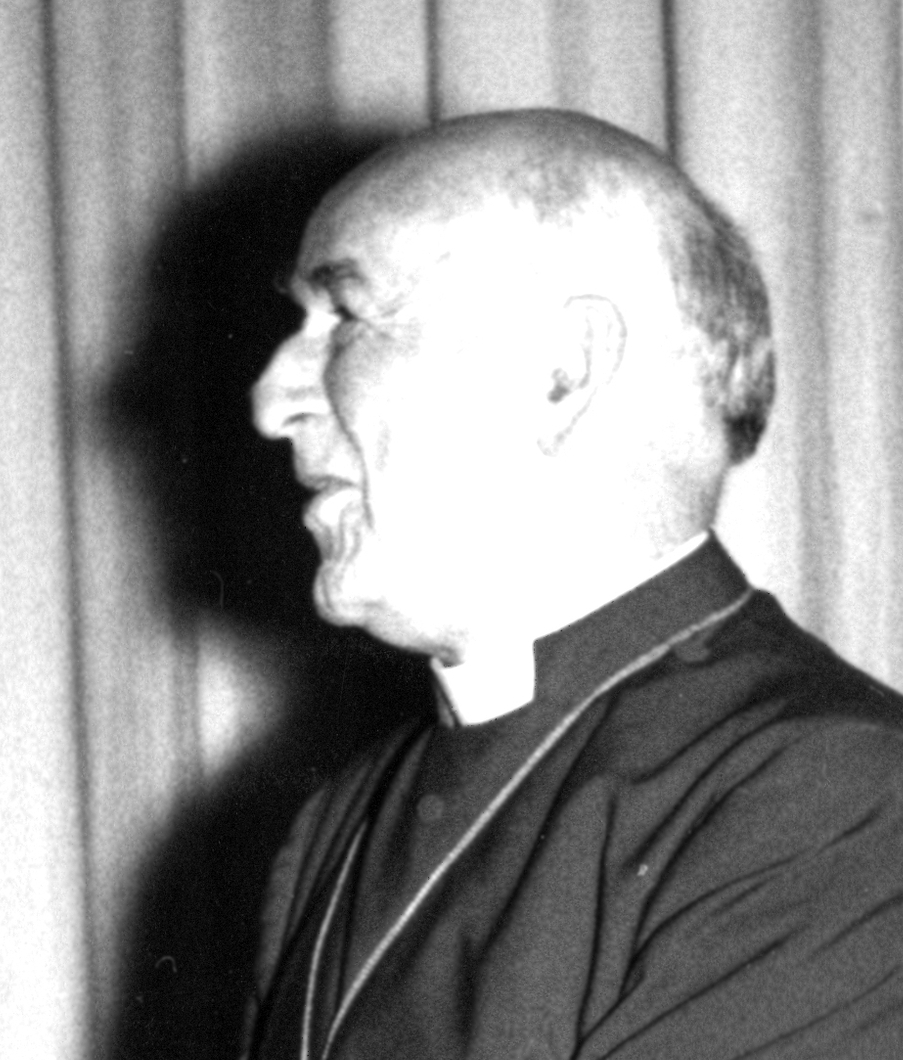
- Fisher in 1961
- Church: Church of England
- Installed: 1945
- Term ended: 1961
- Predecessor: William Temple
- Successor: Michael Ramsey
- Previous posts: Bishop of London (1939–1945); Bishop of Chester (1932–1939)

Orders
- Ordination: 1912 (deacon); 1913 (priest)
- Consecration: 21 September 1932

Personal details
- Born: 5 May 1887 Higham on the Hill, Leicestershire, England
- Died: 15 September 1972 (aged 85)
- Buried: St Andrew's Church, Trent, Dorset, England
- Spouse: Rosamond Chevallier Forman
- Education: Marlborough College; Exeter College, Oxford

Member of the House of Lords
- Lord Temporal
- Life peerage 2 June 1961 – 15 September 1972
- Lord Spiritual
- In office 22 February 1939 – 31 May 1961

Geoffrey Francis Fisher, Baron Fisher of Lambeth, GCVO, PC (5 May 1887 – 15 September 1972) was an English Anglican priest, and 99th Archbishop of Canterbury, serving from 1945 to 1961.

From a long line of parish priests, Fisher was educated at Marlborough College, and Exeter College, Oxford. He achieved high academic honours but was not interested in a university career. He was ordained priest in 1913, and taught at Marlborough for three years; in 1914, aged 27, he was appointed headmaster of Repton School where he served for 18 years. In 1932, having left Repton, he was made Bishop of Chester. In 1939 he accepted the post of Bishop of London, the third most senior post in the Church of England. His term of office began shortly after the start of the Second World War, and his organising skills were required to keep the diocese functioning despite the devastation of the London Blitz.

In 1944 the Archbishop of Canterbury, William Temple, died suddenly, and Fisher was chosen to succeed him. He served from 1945 to 1961. One of the main themes of his time in office was church unity. He worked continually to build bridges to other Christian churches, and in 1960 became the first Archbishop of Canterbury to meet a Pope since the English Reformation, more than four centuries earlier. He overhauled the administration of the Church of England, strengthened international ties with other Anglican churches, and spoke out on a range of topical issues, from divorce to homosexuality, and the Suez Crisis to nuclear disarmament.

Theologically, Fisher was nearer the Evangelical wing of the Church than the Anglo-Catholic, but strongly believed that neither had a monopoly of religious truth. His predecessor and his successor at Canterbury – Temple and Michael Ramsey – were known for scholarly spirituality; Fisher was distinguished by a simple faith combined with outstanding organisational flair. In 1961 he retired from Canterbury and for the first time in his life became a parish priest, serving as honorary curate of a country parish in Dorset. He died in 1972, aged 85.

== Life and career ==
=== Early years ===
Fisher's birthplace, the rectory, Higham on the Hill

Geoffrey Francis Fisher was born on 5 May 1887 at the rectory, Higham on the Hill, Leicestershire, youngest of the ten children of the Rev Henry Fisher and his wife Katherine, née Richmond. A Fisher had served as rector of Higham since 1772: Henry Fisher's father and grandfather had preceded him; his eldest son, Legh, later held the post. (Note: There was a 24-year gap between Henry and Legh's tenure; the latter was appointed in 1943.) After a short time in the Higham village school Fisher was sent to Lindley Lodge, a local preparatory school and in September 1901, having gained a scholarship, he entered Marlborough College, a public school in Wiltshire. He was greatly influenced by the headmaster, Frank Fletcher, an inspiring teacher, (Note: Sir Frank Fletcher (1870–1954) was described by William Temple, Fisher's predecessor as Archbishop of Canterbury, another former Fletcher pupil, as "a supreme teacher") under whose guidance he did well both academically and in sport.

From Marlborough, Fisher won a scholarship to Exeter College, Oxford, going up in October 1906. The college had a strong Anglican tradition with both the low church evangelical and high church Anglo-Catholic wings represented. Fisher, though temperamentally inclined to the former, felt that both had much to offer. He disapproved of those in either camp who believed they had a monopoly of the truth. He rowed and played rugby for the college and distinguished himself academically, leaving with a triple first. (Note: He gained a first in Mods (i.e. "Classical Moderations" – Greek and Latin literature) in 1908; another in Greats ("Literae Humaniores" – philosophy and ancient history) in 1910; and finally in theology in 1911.)

After completing his studies Fisher declined two offers of lecturerships in theology from Oxford colleges. Although intellectually able he was not of an academic turn of mind. In the words of his biographer David Hein, "scholars must be intellectually imaginative and also persistently dissatisfied, even sceptical, in a way that Fisher never was". He said that he did not want "to go on asking questions to which there is no answer". He accepted an invitation from Fletcher to return to Marlborough as a member of the teaching staff, remaining there for three years, during which time he went to Wells Theological College during the long summer vacation in 1911, and was ordained deacon in 1912, and priest in 1913.

=== Repton ===
In 1914 William Temple, the headmaster of Repton School, was appointed rector of the prominent parish of St James's, Piccadilly in London. He then encouraged Fisher to apply for the resulting vacancy at Repton, as did Fletcher. Fisher's application was successful and he took up the headmastership in June 1914, at the age of 27.

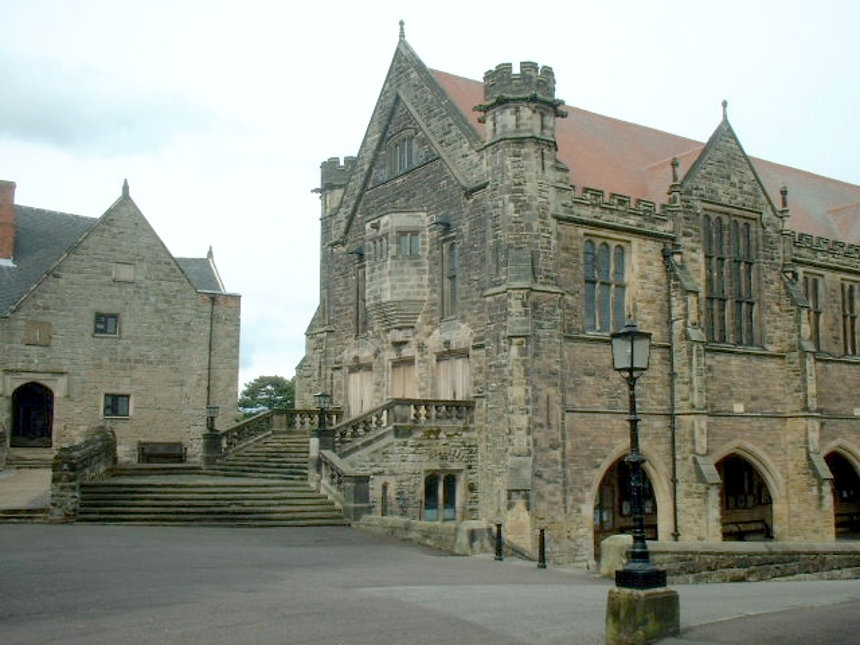
Repton School

Within two months of his appointment Fisher was confronted by problems arising from the outbreak of the First World War. Six of his teaching staff volunteered for the armed forces, as did sixty of the senior boys. As well as coping with a reduced staff and apprehension and restlessness among the pupils, Fisher had to deal with the mixed legacy he had inherited from his predecessor. Although Temple was described as "religiously inspiring and intellectually stimulating", he was no disciplinarian or organiser. Fisher was characterised by The Times as combining "generous humanity and a completely unaffected manner with a passion for order and efficiency".

Fisher was in charge of Repton for 18 years, during which he improved the facilities, instilled firm discipline and modernised the curriculum. His biographer Alan Webster writes:

Fisher was never narrowly dictatorial as headmaster. He encouraged wide reading including Alec Waugh's The Loom of Youth (1917), which dealt frankly with homosexuality; and allowed Victor Gollancz to teach highly critical "civics" even in wartime, until outside protests became too strong.

Among Fisher's pupils at Repton were Stuart Hampshire and Roald Dahl, both of whom complained that his personally administered beatings had been cruel. (Note: Dahl claimed to remember a beating Fisher gave to a fellow pupil in 1933, despite the fact that Fisher was no longer at the school at the time of the supposed incident.) Other pupils admired "his combination of extreme competence, lack of self-concern, and genial humour".

While at Repton, Fisher met Rosamond Chevallier Forman, who was the daughter of a former master at Repton and a granddaughter of S. A. Pears, a famous headmaster of the school. They were married on 12 April 1917; they had six children, all sons. Webster writes that the marriage was lifelong and mutually supportive. By the early 1930s Fisher felt that it was time to move on from Repton, and was hoping for an appointment as a parish priest, preferably in a rural parish.

=== Bishop of Chester ===
Chester Cathedral

Temple had watched his successor's progress at Repton, and once again intervened to further Fisher's career. Temple, by now Archbishop of York, commended Fisher to Cosmo Lang, the Archbishop of Canterbury. Lang was impressed enough to put Fisher's name on the short list (of two candidates) when the see of Chester became vacant on the retirement of Luke Paget. At the time, bishops were appointed by the Crown on the advice of the Prime Minister. Ramsay MacDonald recommended Fisher to George V; the appointment was approved, and on 21 September 1932 Temple consecrated Fisher bishop in York Minster, and the following week Fisher was enthroned as Bishop of Chester at Chester Cathedral.

It was unusual for a bishop to be appointed without having any experience as a parish priest, and Fisher had to overcome reservations about him on that score from some of the clergy in his diocese. Webster writes that Fisher and his wife proved to be exceptionally hard-working, but the lack of previous pastoral experience showed:

Occasionally they were out of touch, urging women not to go out to work despite the very low level of agricultural wages and desperate poverty in some industrial areas. Their background isolated them from the alienation of working-class people, both in the industrial and agricultural parishes, from the established church. Yet the good humour and informality of the Fishers won them many friends, both at home and abroad.

Fisher became an advocate for rationalisation in many aspects of church life. He pointed out the discrepancies in the remuneration of the clergy, with some of them extremely poorly paid; (Note: Fisher told his diocesan conference that if it were in his power he would make every beneficiary carry the same stipend, with additional allowances for length of service and special claims.) he drew attention to the lack of a consistent appointment system; he intervened to save the Church Training College in Chester from threatened closure; strengthened the financial administration of the diocese; and campaigned for financial support of church schools, overseas missions and the widows of clergy. He was at the forefront of the Industrial Christian Fellowship Mission, and his commitment often took him to the slums of Birkenhead. In Webster's summary, "He was a confident bishop, never doubting the natural and pastoral role of the established church or experiencing the post-1900 questionings in philosophy and theology. He had no hesitations over his own faith".

=== Bishop of London ===
In 1939, Arthur Winnington-Ingram, the long-serving Bishop of London, retired at the age of 81. During his 38-year tenure, the diocese was riven by factions and came close to disintegrating. It was clear that Winnington-Ingram's successor must be a man with a strong hand; Fisher was seen as one such, and Lang favoured his appointment. But although Fisher's record as an organiser and disciplinarian was well known, his theological views were not, and the Prime Minister, Neville Chamberlain, sought reassurance from Lang that Fisher was doctrinally sound. The archbishop told Chamberlain that Fisher was "undoubtedly a man of deep personal religion. His piety is that of the best type of English layman ... he is very shy and humble about it (very English)". Chamberlain was reassured, and recommended to George VI that Fisher should succeed Winnington-Ingram. The King approved the appointment, but Fisher hesitated when offered it. He saw the great difficulties the turbulent diocese presented, and doubted his ability to unite it. After much private prayer, and reassurance from colleagues, he accepted and was enthroned as Bishop of London in St Paul's Cathedral in November 1939.

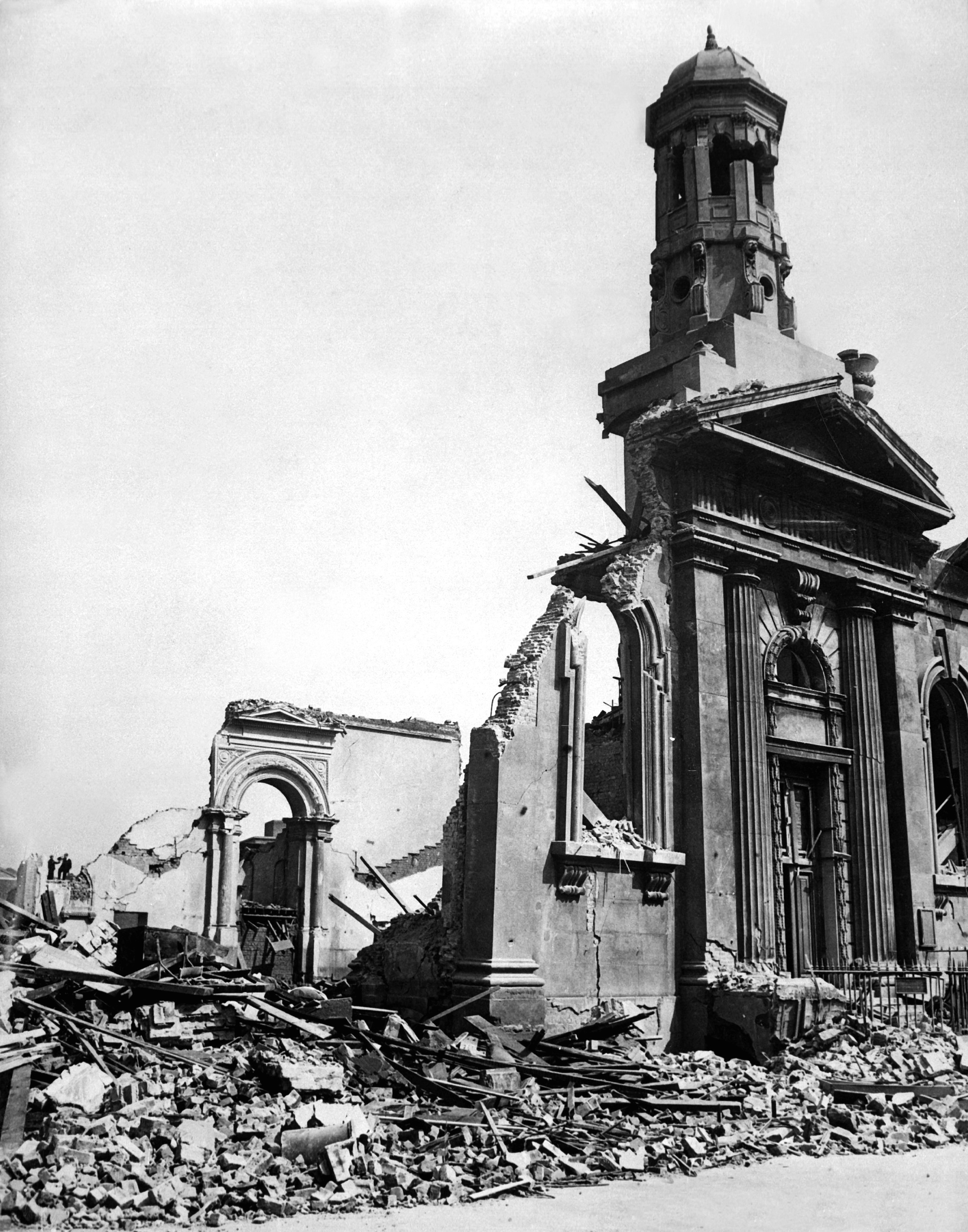
Wartime bombing hit London churches severely

The Second World War had broken out shortly before Fisher took up his London post, and from September 1940 the city suffered nightly bombing. Twenty-three Wren City churches were bombed by 1941, some beyond repair. Urgent action was needed to deal with devastated parishes. Fisher took the lead in the church assembly and in the House of Lords (Note: Senior diocesan bishops sat, and still (2019) sit by right in the House of Lords.) and the resulting measure was largely his work. Webster writes that Fisher showed courtesy, skill, and determination in "defeating ultra-conservative attitudes which would have prevented any episcopal intervention even in severely blitzed areas".

Fisher, in the words of The Times, went about his duties "with a calm diligence which won general respect" and returned each night to sleep in the cellar at Fulham Palace. The war and the leadership of Temple – who succeeded Lang at Canterbury in 1942 – had begun to improve relations between the various Christian churches – Anglican, Roman Catholic and noncomformist. Though firmly Protestant in his views Fisher strongly supported this and acted as chairman of the joint committee in which the Anglican and Free Church "Religion and Life" movement cooperated with the Roman Catholic "Sword of the Spirit" led by Cardinal Hinsley, in the cause of "moral regeneration and social reform". Fisher was frustrated by the refusal of some Roman Catholics to say even the Lord's Prayer with Protestants. Hinsley's death in 1943 was another blow to inter-church co-operation; his successor was opposed to it. (Note: Hinsley's two immediate successors, Archbishops Bernard Griffin and William Godfrey were unenthusiastic about co-operation with Protestants, and distanced their church from ecumenism.) Another only partial success for Fisher was his attempt to regulate the variety of forms of worship in London churches. The diocese had a tradition of High Church ritualism, (Note: Anglo-Catholicism was dubbed the "London, Brighton and South-Coast religion".) and clerical dissent from the provisions of the Book of Common Prayer. Fisher sought to pursue the principle of apostolic authority to bring all parishes in the diocese back into conformity, but the matter was not resolved when he ceased to be Bishop of London in 1945.

=== Archbishop of Canterbury ===
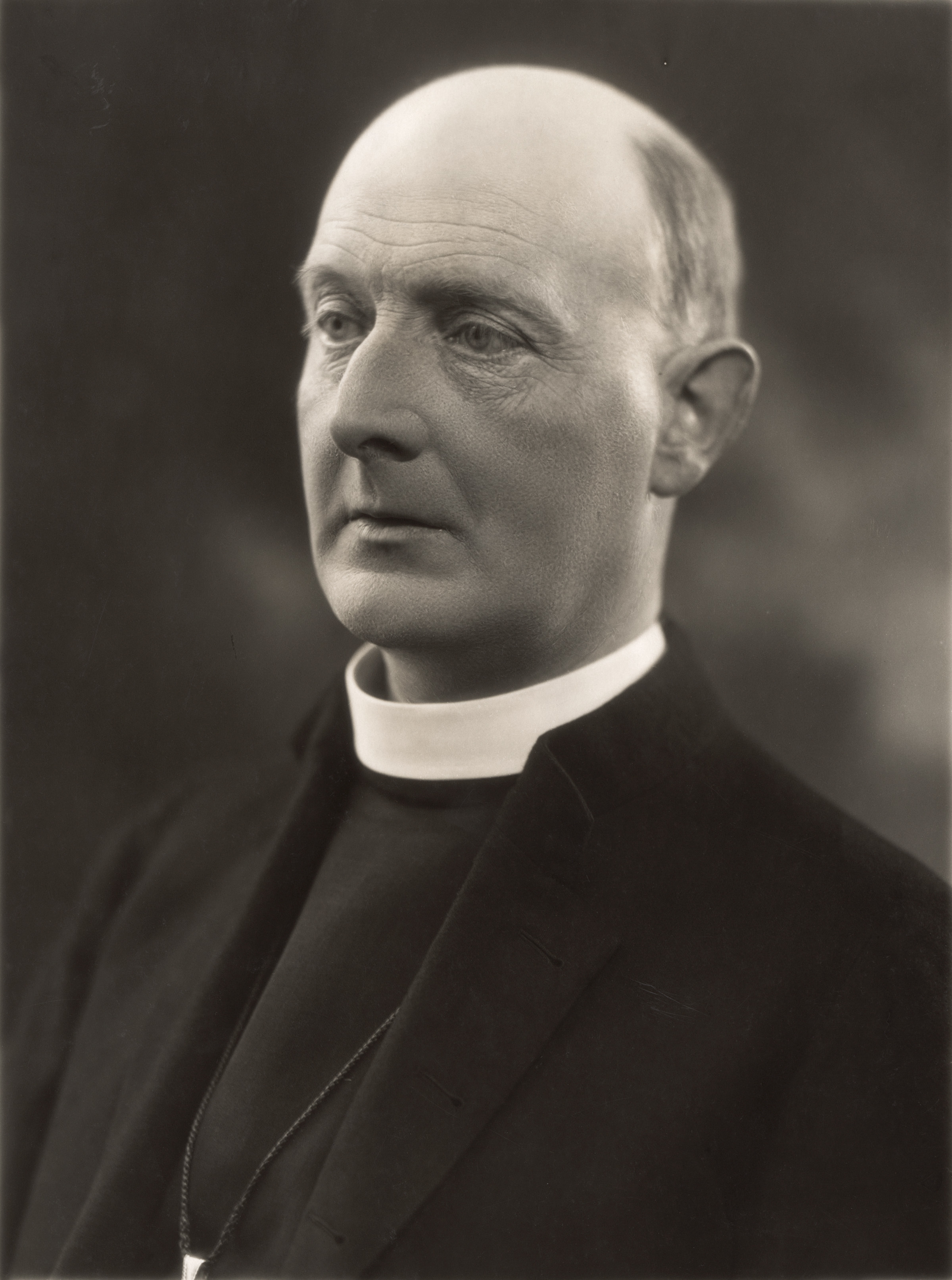
Cyril Garbett, Fisher's counterpart as Archbishop of York

In October 1944 Archbishop Temple died suddenly. Cyril Garbett, the Archbishop of York, was nearly 70 and declined to succeed him at Canterbury. Many in the church hoped that the Prime Minister, Winston Churchill, would appoint another reform-minded idealist such as George Bell, the Bishop of Chichester, but Churchill chose Fisher. Temple had hoped Fisher would be his successor, valuing his precision and administrative skill. Garbett, too, approved; he and Fisher were close personal friends. In his view Canterbury needed "a dynamic presence for some years, not a caretaker", and he welcomed working with Fisher. Nonetheless, after Churchill lost the 1945 general election, the Church was left, in Webster's words, with "a reforming Labour government" but "a conservative, headmasterly archbishop who, though warm-hearted, was determined to maintain the protestant establishment". According to The Times, Garbett and Fisher cooperated in the government of the Church in an unusually close manner made possible by strong mutual regard. "Garbett had a wider knowledge of social matters and was more at home than Fisher in the disputed territory which lies between religion and politics. Fisher was happy to have his hands free for the task of refurbishing the administrative structure of the Church". His obituarist in The Guardian wrote, "It was a grim and testing moment for any man to take up the highest position in the whole of the Anglican communion. He at once rose to it, partly by his clear self-knowledge that he was no Temple and must never try to become one."

==== Canon law ====
Fisher put considerable effort into revising the Church of England's canon law. The canons of 1604 were still nominally in force, despite being substantially out of date. (Note: Fisher's biographers Chandler and Hein cite such anachronisms as rules about what the clergy might wear: "No ecclesiastical person shall wear any coif or wrought night-cap, but only plain night-caps of black silk, satin or velvet ... and that they wear not any light-coloured stockings".) His efforts provoked bitter controversy. In 1946 he preached a university sermon at Cambridge on the theme that communion between the Church of England and the Free Churches was possible and should be pursued. His enthusiastic support for the World Council of Churches and his blessing of the new Church of South India, an Anglican and Free Church coalition, were viewed with hostility by some Anglo-Catholics. They suspected Fisher of fostering pan-Protestantism, and the force with which he criticised the exclusiveness of the Church of Rome added to their resistance. They regarded his detailed and painstaking revision of canon law with similar suspicion. The Times summed up:

They thought that he was permitting, under a guise of liberalism, certain modest deviations from the Book of Common Prayer merely in order to get an excuse for enforcing conformity more vigorously than before. In the name of the middle way, they said, he was plotting the destruction of the Anglo-Catholic movement as a prelude to the creation of an unequivocally Protestant National Church and its absorption in a loose federation of Churches without even the common bond of episcopacy.

Fisher also met resistance from liberals in the church, who regarded his canon law reforms as unduly bureaucratic and calculated to institute a regime of "prosecutions and petty persecutions". The reforms were eventually accepted, but it took many years: they were not formally adopted until 1969, under Fisher's successor, Michael Ramsey.

==== Marriages, coronation and divorces ====
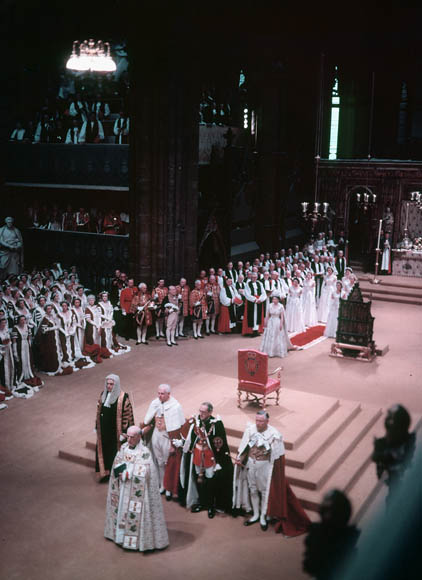
Fisher (front) at the coronation of Queen Elizabeth II, 1953. Behind him, from l.: Lord Simonds (Lord Chancellor), Lord Cholmondeley (Lord Great Chamberlain), Lord Alanbrooke (Lord High Constable of England) and the Duke of Norfolk (Earl Marshal)

Fisher officiated at the marriage of Princess Elizabeth in Westminster Abbey in 1947, and after her accession to the throne he led the coronation service in 1953, and crowned her as queen. Shortly afterwards he was drawn into a controversy when the Queen's younger sister, Princess Margaret, was romantically linked with Peter Townsend, a divorced man. The Church of England regarded marriage as a lifelong commitment and divorcés or divorcées could not remarry in church. The princess decided not to marry Townsend, and although she stated that her decision had been made "entirely alone", mindful of the Church's teaching on the indissolubility of marriage, it was rumoured that Fisher had influenced her in taking a course widely regretted among the British public. The Prime Minister's son, Randolph Churchill, commented that the rumour "has done incalculable harm to the Church of England".

One of Fisher's aims during his 16 years as archbishop was to make the position of the Church about the marriage of divorced people widely understood and accepted. He staunchly upheld the rules that would have prevented Princess Margaret and Townsend from marrying in church, but in the words of The Guardian, he "combin[ed] that undoubted rigour with a profound compassion for all those whose lives had been ... wrecked by a disastrous marriage. That road lay over a knife-edge of perplexity and contradiction, but he trod it creatively."

==== Church unity and administration ====
For Fisher, the most important initiative of his archiepiscopate was to advance the cause of Christian unity. Strengthening ties did not necessarily mean converging theologically. To Fisher, better relations grew out of free communication and mutual respect. In his speech at Cambridge in 1946 he urged full communion between the episcopal and non-episcopal churches, in which there were no barriers to exchanges of ministers and ministries. His efforts led to the prospect of union with the Methodists, and his visit to Rome in 1960 to meet Pope John XXIII. The Guardian reported that Fisher was received in the Vatican "not as a bishop on pilgrimage but as the Father in God of the entire Anglican Communion"; the visit marked the end of centuries of hostility between Canterbury and Rome. Parallel with his quest for inter-church Christian unity was Fisher's concern to strengthen the community between the various international Churches within the Anglican Communion. Partly because of the enforced separation caused by the Second World War, worldwide Anglican ties had become weak. Fisher began in 1946 with a visit to Canada and the United States, during which he established or strengthened links between the English and the North American episcopates. After that he travelled continually to almost every part of the Anglican Communion, establishing that principle that "an Archbishop of Canterbury must be peripatetic" globally. He arranged for the Anglican Communion to have a chief executive officer, the first of whom was Bishop Stephen Bayne of the US.

As he had at Chester, as Archbishop of Canterbury Fisher concerned himself with modernising the administration of the Church. According to The Guardian, "His incessant pleas to relieve the poverty of the clergy were heard, and it was in his time that the Church Commissioners shook themselves free from their old obligation to invest only in trustee securities – a stroke which relieved many a vicarage from grinding poverty".

==== Later years as archbishop ====
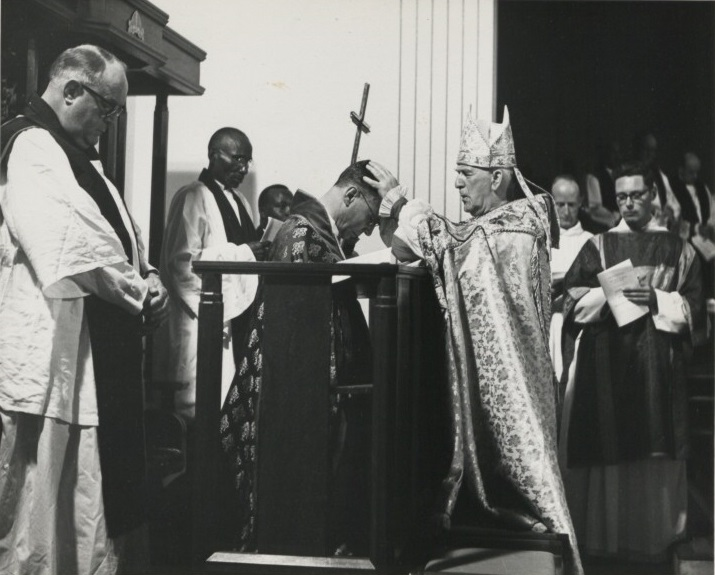
Fisher blessing the new Archbishop of East Africa, Leonard Beecher, St Alban's Church, Dar es Salaam, 1960

In 1956 Garbett, Fisher's friend and confidant, retired; the new Archbishop of York was Michael Ramsey. He had been a pupil under Fisher at Repton, and in the words of a biographer, Fisher "still played the headmaster" to Ramsey even after he became an archbishop. Ramsey was described by The Times as "a theologian in, but not quite of, the world of high-powered ecclesiastical committees". Without Garbett's skill in political matters, Fisher began to make incautious and sometimes controversial pronouncements. Matters were exacerbated by his suspicion of the British press, and his dislike was frequently reciprocated, causing Fisher to receive hostile press coverage on occasion. He spoke frequently in the House of Lords. In 1957 he gave a cautious welcome to the Wolfenden report (1957) which advocated decriminalising homosexual practices, saying there was "a realm which is not the law's business; a sacred area of privacy where people make their own choices and decisions into which the law must not intrude". He also welcomed the decision of the Lambeth Conference in favour of family planning: "It is utterly wrong to urge that unless children are specifically desired, sexual intercourse is of the nature of sin". He clashed with the Conservative governments of Anthony Eden and Harold Macmillan over the Suez Crisis of 1956 and Macmillan's introduction of premium bonds (which Fisher called "squalid") and his assertion that Britain had "never had it so good".

In 1958, at a time of heightened fear of nuclear war and mutual destruction between the West and the Soviet Union, Fisher said that he was "convinced that it is never right to settle any policy simply out of fear of the consequences. For all I know it is within the providence of God that the human race should destroy itself in this manner." He was also quoted as saying, "The very worst the Bomb can do is to sweep a vast number of people from this world into the next into which they must all go anyway". He was heavily criticised in the press for this view, but a number of clergy, including Christopher Chavasse, Bishop of Rochester, defended him, saying, "In an evil world, war can be the lesser of the two evils."

Fisher tried to influence the choice of his successor. He preferred the evangelical Donald Coggan, Bishop of Bradford, to the more obvious choice, Ramsey. To Fisher, the latter was too much a party man – too closely allied with the Anglo-Catholic wing of the church. Macmillan, with whom Fisher got on least well of the four prime ministers with whom he had to deal during his time in office, was not swayed by his arguments. Several versions exist of the exchange between archbishop and premier, all to the effect that Fisher said that as Ramsey's former headmaster he did not consider him suitable, to which Macmillan is said to have replied that Fisher may have been Ramsey's headmaster but had never been his, and that he would make up his own mind. Fisher retired on 17 January 1961; Ramsey succeeded him.

=== Retirement ===
Fisher was made a life peer, with the title of Baron Fisher of Lambeth, of Lambeth in the County of London. He and his wife settled at Trent rectory, near Sherborne, in Dorset, where he served as an honorary assistant priest. Webster describes him as "a warm-hearted country parson, getting to know everyone in the village and playing chess with some of the boys". In retirement he bombarded his successor with "critical and sometimes harsh comments" (Webster). Ramsey, though hurt, contented himself with observing, "The trouble with Geoffrey is that he could not get episcopacy out of his system".

Fisher died on 15 September 1972 and was buried in the churchyard at Trent on 20 September. A memorial service, led by Ramsey, was held in Canterbury Cathedral on the same day as Fisher's interment at Trent. Ramsey concluded his eulogy, "Today Christians of every tradition, Orthodox, Roman Catholic, Anglican, Protestant, salute the memory of a leader and a friend". A memorial to Fisher was erected in the chapel of St Gregory in Canterbury Cathedral.

== Honours ==
As well as being created a life peer, Fisher received the Royal Victorian Chain in 1949, and was made Knight Grand Cross of the Royal Victorian Order in 1953. He received honorary degrees from Cambridge, Columbia, Pennsylvania and Princeton (all 1946), London (1948), Manchester (1950), Edinburgh (1953), Yale (1954), British Columbia (1954), Northwestern University, Evanston (1954), General Theological Seminary, New York (1957), Trinity College, Dublin (1961), and Assumption University of Windsor, Ontario (1962). He was prelate of the Order of St John of Jerusalem (1946–1967). He was made a freeman of the cities of London and Canterbury (1952) and of Croydon (1961).

Coat of arms of Geoffrey Fisher
Coronet Coronet of a British Baron Crest A King's Fisher Proper holding in the dexter claw a fleur-de-lys Sable. Escutcheon Argent, a fess wavy between three fleur-de-lys Sable. Orders The Knight Grand Cross (GCVO) circlet of the Royal Victorian Order; VICTORIA

== Notes, references and sources ==
=== Sources ===
- Carpenter, Edward (1991). Archbishop Fisher: His Life and Times. Norwich: Canterbury Press. ISBN 978-1-85311-016-0.
- Chandler, Andrew; David Hein (2012). Archbishop Fisher, 1945–1961. The Archbishops of Canterbury. London: Routledge. ISBN 978-1-4094-1233-5.
- Dales, Douglas (2001). Glory Descending: Michael Ramsey and his Writings. Grand Rapids: W.B. Eerdmans. ISBN 978-0-8028-3039-5.
- Hein, David (2008). Geoffrey Fisher: Archbishop of Canterbury. Cambridge: James Clarke. ISBN 978-0-227-17295-7.
- Hennessy, Peter (2001). The Prime Minister: The Office and its Holders Since 1945. London: Penguin Books. ISBN 978-0-14-028393-8.
- Sumner Holmes, Ann (2017). The Church of England and Divorce in the Twentieth Century. New York: Routledge. ISBN 978-1-84893-617-1.

Church of England titles
Preceded by Luke Paget	Bishop of Chester; 1932–1939	Succeeded by Douglas Crick
Preceded by Arthur Winnington-Ingram	Bishop of London; 1939–1945	Succeeded by William Wand
Preceded by William Temple	Archbishop of Canterbury; 1945–1961	Succeeded by Michael Ramsey
Academic offices
Preceded by William Temple	Headmaster of Repton School; 1914–1932	Succeeded by John Christie
