= Peter Mwang'ombe =

Kenyan Anglican priest

Rt. Rev. Peter Mwang'ombe Mwakota was a Kenyan Anglican priest in the second half of the 20th century.

He was educated in Limuru and ordained in 1945. He was Archdeacon of Mombasa from 1955 until 1964 when he was appointed Bishop of Mombasa. On his appointment he was the first African and the 5th Anglican Bishop of the diocese of Mombasa that then covered the present diocese of Taita Taveta and Malindi. The diocese of Taita Taveta was created in 1992, and its first Bishop was the Rt. Rev. Emeritus Bishop Samson Mwaluda.
