= Reginald Crabbe =

British runner and Anglican bishop (1883–1964)

Personal information
- Born: 15 July 1883 Barton Regis, England
- Died: 22 October 1964 (aged 81) Bexhill-on-Sea, England

Sport
- Sport: Athletics
- Event: middle-distance
- Club: University of Cambridge; London Athletic Club

The Rt Rev Reginald Percy Crabbe (15 July 1883 – 22 October 1964) was an Anglican bishop in the mid-20th century.

== Biography ==
Crabbe was born into an ecclesiastical family on 15 July 1883, educated at Trent College and Corpus Christi College, Cambridge and ordained in 1907.

At Cambridge he excelled in athletics and was part of the London Athletic Club, in addition to the Cambridge Athletic Club. He finished second behind Bernard Blunden at the 1905 AAA Championships.

He represented Great Britain at the 1906 Olympic Games in the 800m and 1500m.

After a curacy at St George's, Newcastle-under-Lyme he was Chaplain to the Bishop of Sierra Leone. He then held Incumbencies at St Mary's Peckham, and St Mary's, Sheffield. From 1924 to 1936 he was Rural Dean of Greenwich then Dulwich. In 1936 he became Bishop of Mombasa. He returned to England in 1953 and was an Assistant Bishop in the Diocese of Portsmouth until 1958. He died on 22 October 1964.

Anglican Communion titles
Preceded by Richard Stanley Heywood	Bishop of Mombasa; 1936–1953	Succeeded by Leonard James Beecher
