= Richard Heywood (bishop) =

Anglican bishop

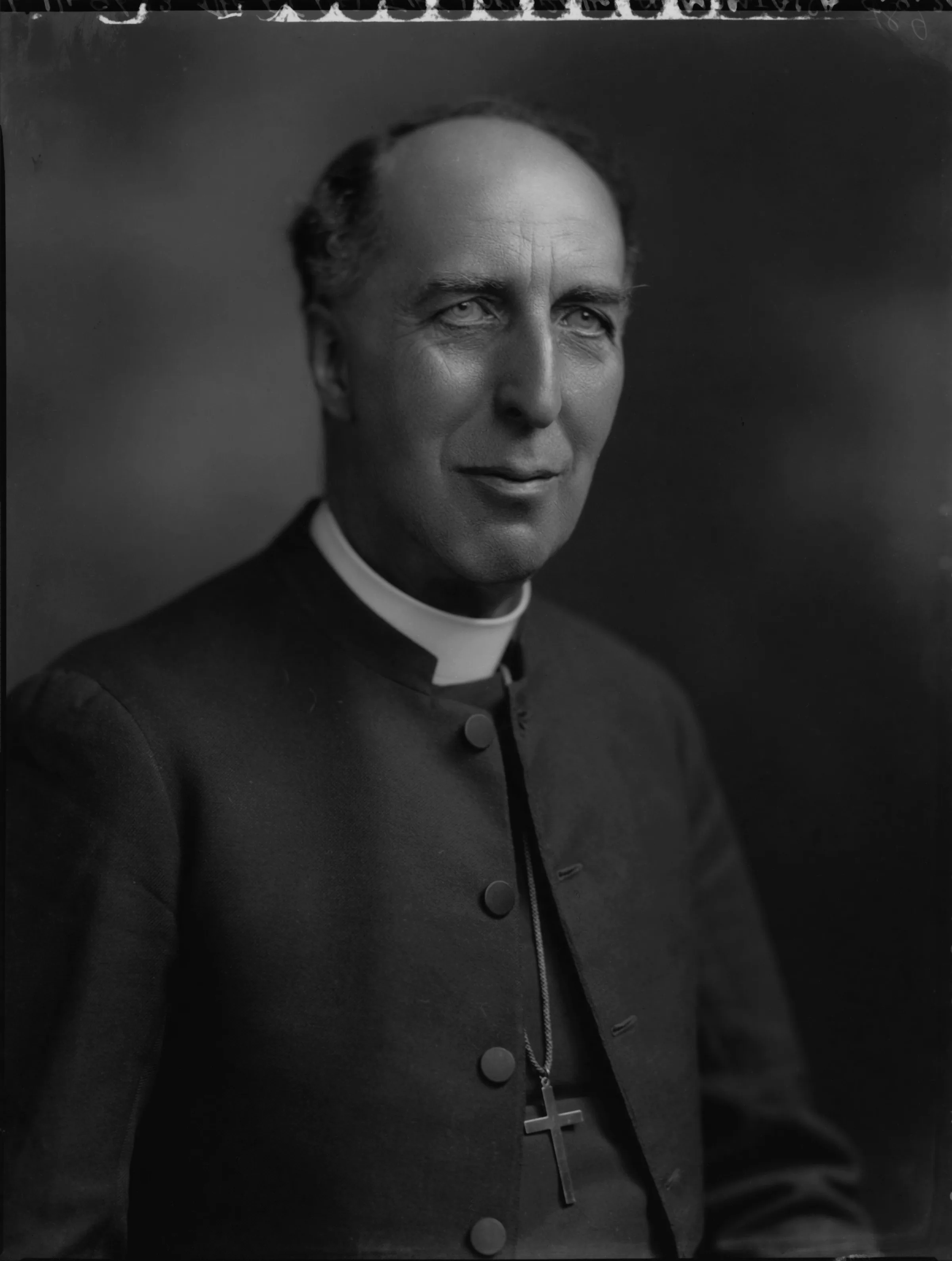
Heywood in 1930

The Rt Rev Richard Stanley Heywood (1867–1955) was an Anglican bishop in the first half of the 20th century.

He was born on 27 October 1867, educated at Windlesham House School, Wellington College and Trinity College, Cambridge, and ordained in 1892. After a curacy in Walcot, Bath, he was Principal of the CMS Divinity School, Poona and then held a similar post in Bombay. In 1918 he became Bishop of Mombasa. He retired to Kenilworth in 1936 and was an Assistant Bishop of Coventry until 1952. He died on 16 December 1955.

Heywood married Mary Isobel Courtier Whitley(1870-1956) in 1894. They had three children Margaret 'Madge' Elizabeth (Williams) (1899-1982); Kathleen Mary (1902-1999) (m. Douglas Strangways-Dixon); Norah Isabel (Lawrence) (1905-1993).

== Notes ==
Anglican Communion titles
Preceded by William George Peel	Bishop of Mombasa; 1918–1936	Succeeded by Reginald Percy Crabbe
