= All Saints' Cathedral, Nairobi =

Cathedral of the Anglican Church of Kenya

Coordinates: 01°17′12″S 36°49′03″E

All Saints' Cathedral, Nairobi, formerly the Cathedral of the Highlands, is a cathedral of the Anglican Church of Kenya (ACK) in Nairobi.

== Background ==
The CMS missionary Johann Ludwig Krapf arrived in 1844 and established a mission station at Rabai. Bishop William Peel conducted the first Anglican service in Nairobi in 1900 which was founded in 1899 when a railway depot was built. In 1902 the Rev. Philip Alfred Bennett arrived as Chaplain. The first church was consecrated in 1904.

In the early 1990s, during the presidency of Daniel arap Moi, the Release Political Prisoners party was formed to secure the release of political prisoners of the Moi regime, and to protest state-sanctioned torture and random imprisonment. The police dispersed the protestors and many of the mothers of these political prisoners from Freedom Corner in Uhuru Park on 3 March 1992. After a year-long vigil and hunger strike by many of the mothers of these political prisoners in All Saints' Cathedral near Uhuru Park, the government released 51 prisoners en masse in early 1993.

== Building ==
In July 1914 a public meeting was held to raise money for a permanent church in the centre of Nairobi. The architect was Temple Moore and the foundation stone for the Church of All Saints was laid on 3 February 1917. A year later Bishop Richard Heywood dedicated the incomplete new church. In November 1924, the Church of All Saints became the Cathedral of the Highlands. Further portions of the building were completed in 1934 and in 1952. That year All Saints' Cathedral was finally consecrated by Bishop Reginald Crabbe.
