= William Peel (bishop) =

British Anglican bishop (1854–1916)

The Right Reverend William Peel
- Bishop of Mombasa
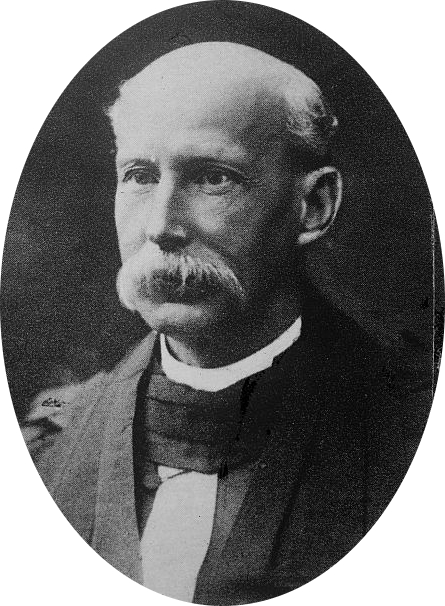
- Peel c. 1910–15
- Diocese: Anglican diocese of Mombasa
- In office: 1899 to 1916
- Successor: Richard Heywood

Orders
- Ordination: 1875
- Consecration: 29 June 1899 by Frederick Temple

Personal details
- Born: 1854
- Died: 15 April 1916 (aged 61–62)

William George Peel (1854 – 15 April 1916) was the Anglican Bishop of Mombasa in what is now Kenya. He was accused of heresy in the Kikuyu controversy.

== Biography ==
Peel was born in 1854, educated at Blackheath Proprietary School, and ordained in 1875. After a curacy in Trowbridge, he went out as a missionary to India, where he rose to be principal of Noble College Masulipatam. Appointment to the episcopate as the third bishop of Mombasa came in 1899 — he was consecrated a bishop on St Peter's Day (29 June) 1899 by Frederick Temple, Archbishop of Canterbury, at St Paul's Cathedral. In October 1899 and December 1909 he presented the prizes at the annual Commemoration Day of Monkton Combe School in Somerset, of which his father in law, the Revd R G Bryan, was Principal.

After celebrating an ecumenical communion service with Methodists and Presbyterians in Kikuyu, and giving communion to non-Anglicans, he was accused of heresy by Bishop Frank Weston of Zanzibar in the Kikuyu controversy.

He died in post on 15 April 1916.

Church of England titles
Preceded by Henry Perrott Parker	Bishop of Mombasa; 1899–1916	Succeeded by Richard Stanley Heywood
