= Thomas Hatchard =

English bishop of Mauritius (1818-1870)

Thomas Goodwin Hatchard (also spelled Goodwyn; 1818–1870) was an English bishop of Mauritius.

== Life ==
Hatchard, son of Thomas Hatchard, the publisher (d 13 Nov. 1858), and grandson of John Hatchard, was born at 11 Sloane Street, Chelsea, on 18 Sept. 1817, and educated at King's College School, London. He matriculated from Brasenose College, Oxford, as Thomas Goodwyn Hatchard on 11 April 1837, graduated B.A. 1841, M.A. 1845, and D.D. 4 Feb. 1869.

He was curate of Windlesham, Surrey, from 1842 to 1844, domestic chaplain to the Marquess of Conyngham from 1845 to 1869; rector of Havant, Hampshire, from 1846 to 1856, and of St. Nicolas' Church, Guildford, Surrey, from 1856 to 1869.

He was ordained and consecrated a bishop at Westminster Abbey on 24 February 1869 by Archibald Campbell Tait, Archbishop of Canterbury; George Selwyn, Bishop of New Zealand; and six other prelates. He belonged to the moderate evangelical school. As a parochial clergyman he was indefatigable in his duties.

He died of cholera in the island of Mauritius 28 Feb. 1870.

He married, 19 Feb. 1846, Fanny Vincent Steele, second daughter of the Right Rev. Michael Solomon Alexander, bishop of Jerusalem. She died at Cannes, 7 Dec. 1880.

== Publications ==
- ‘The German Tree. A Moral for the Young,’ 1851.
- ‘The Floweret Gathered. A brief Memoir of Adelaide Charlotte Hatchard, his daughter,’ 1858.
- ‘Sermons,’ 1847–62 (four pamphlets).

His wife published:

- ‘Eight Years' Experience of Mothers' Meetings,’ 1871.
- ‘Prayers for Little Children,’ 1872.
- ‘Mothers' Meetings, and how to organize them,’ 1875.
- ‘Mothers of Scripture,’ 1875.
- ‘Thoughts on the Lord's Prayer,’ 1878.
- ‘Prayers for Mothers' Meetings,’ 1878.
