= St. Paul's University, Limuru =

Private Christian ecumenical University

Coordinates: 0°52′41″N 37°18′59″E

St. Paul's University
- Vice-Chancellor: Prof. James Kombo
- Students: Over 6000
- Location: Limuru, Kiambu County, Kenya
- Website: www.spu.ac.ke

St. Paul's University is a private Christian ecumenical University with its main campus in Limuru, Kiambu County Kenya approximately 30km from Nairobi . It was officially chartered as a university on 14 September 2007 by His Excellency Hon. Mwai Kibaki.The university offers courses in theology, social sciences, and other professional fields. It admits students and staff from different religious and cultural backgrounds.In 1903, the foundation stone for St. Paul’s Divinity School was laid, and by 1930, the institution relocated to Limuru to expand its theological training.

== Origins as a Theological College (1903) ==
St. Paul’s University traces its origins to the early missionary efforts in East Africa.In 1903, the Church Missionary Society (CMS) laid the foundation stone for St. Paul’s Divinity School at Frere Town, near Mombasa, with the aim of training African clergy and teacher-evangelists for the Anglican institution. Later, it relocated to Limuru to expand its theological training capacity. By 1955, the institution became known as St.Paul’s United Theological College. In 2008, the university installed its first Chancellor, followed by the establishment of satellite campuses in Nairobi (2010), Nakuru, and Machakos (2011). In 2020, the university graduated its first cohort of PhD students and laid the foundation stone for the Joshua and Timothy School of Theology.

== Leadership ==
The university is led by Vice-Chancellor Rev. Canon Prof. James Kombo, supported by Deputy Vice Chancellors in academics, finance, and administration.

== Accreditation ==
It acquired the status of university, on September 14, 2007 and the University was awarded a Charter to become St. Paul's University. St .Paul University is also a Member of the Association of Commonwealth Universities.

== Denominational Partnerships ==
- Anglican Church of Kenya (ACK)
- Presbyterian Church of East Africa (PCEA)
- Methodist Church in Kenya (MCK)
- National Council of Churches of Kenya (NCCK)
- All Africa Conference of Churches (AACC)

== Campuses ==
- Limuru (Main Campus)
- Nairobi Campus
- Nakuru Campus
- Virtual Campus

== Academics ==
=== Postgraduate Program ===
==== Doctorate Programmes ====
- Doctor of Philosophy in Business Administration and Management
- Doctor of Philosophy in Development Studies
- Doctor of Philosophy in Theology

==== Masters' Programmes ====
- Master of Arts in Communication Studies
- Master of Arts in Community Care & HIV/AIDS
- Masters of Arts in Counselling Psychology
- Master of Arts in Islam and Christian-Muslim Relations
- Master of Arts in Sociology
- Master of Arts in Transformational Leadership
- Master of Business Administration
- Master of Development Studies
- Master of Education (Early Childhood Studies)
- Master of Procurement and Logistics Management
- Master of Public Administration and Policy
- Masters in Theology

=== Undergraduate Programmes ===
- Bachelor of Arts in Communication
- Bachelor of Arts in Community Development
- Bachelor of Arts in Counseling Psychology
- Bachelor of Arts in Criminal Justice and Security Studies
- Bachelor of Arts in Leadership and Management
- Bachelor of Arts in Peace and Conflict Studies
- Bachelor of Arts in Social Work
- Bachelor of Business Administration & Management
- Bachelor of Business and Information Technology
- Bachelor of Commerce
- Bachelor of Computer Science
- Bachelor of Divinity
- Bachelor of Education (Arts)
- Bachelor of Education (Special Needs)
- Bachelor of Education Education In Early Childhood Development and Education (ECDE)
- Bachelor of Science in Computing and Information Systems
- Bachelor of Science in Nursing (Regular)
- Bachelor of Science in Health Records Management and Informatics
- Bachelor of Science in Health Systems Management and Economics
- Bachelor of Translation Studies

=== Diploma Programmes ===
- Diploma in Business Information Technology (DBIT)
- Diploma in Business Management
- Diploma in Clinical Medicine and Surgery
- Diploma in Communication
- Diploma in Community Development
- Diploma in Community Health Development
- Diploma in Computer Science
- Diploma in Counseling Psychology
- Diploma in Criminology and Security Management
- Diploma in Education (Arts)
- Diploma in Film Production
- Diploma in Health Records Management
- Diploma in Hotel and Catering Management
- Diploma in Information Technology
- Diploma in Journalism
- Diploma in Leadership and Management
- Diploma in Music
- Diploma in Peace Building and Conflict Resolution
- Diploma in Public Relations
- Diploma in Social Work
- Diploma in Theology

== Location ==
St. Paul’s University Main Campus in Kenya is located in Limuru. It is strategically located in the lush Kiambu County along Nairobi-Limuru Route A, approximately 30 km from Nairobi area near Nairobi city. Its other campuses are located in Nairobi, Nakuru and Machakos.

== Notable people ==
- Mercy Chebeni (born 1992), accountant and Orange Democratic Movement politician
