= Anglican Church of Kenya =

Province of the Anglican Communion

- Classification: Protestant
- Orientation: Anglican
- Scripture: Protestant Bible
- Theology: Anglican doctrine
- Polity: Episcopal
- Primate: Jackson Ole Sapit
- Associations: Anglican Communion, GAFCON
- Headquarters: Nairobi, Kenya
- Territory: Kenya
- Members: 5,000,000
- Official website: www.ackenya.org

The Anglican Church of Kenya (ACK) is a province of the Anglican Communion, and it is composed by 41 dioceses. The current leader and Archbishop of Kenya is Jackson Ole Sapit. According to a study published in the Journal of Anglican Studies and by Cambridge University Press, the ACK claims 5 million adherents, with no official definition of membership, with nearly 2 million officially affiliated members, and between 310,000 - 400,000 active members. The church became part of the Province of East Africa in 1960, but Kenya and Tanzania were divided into separate provinces in 1970.

== History ==
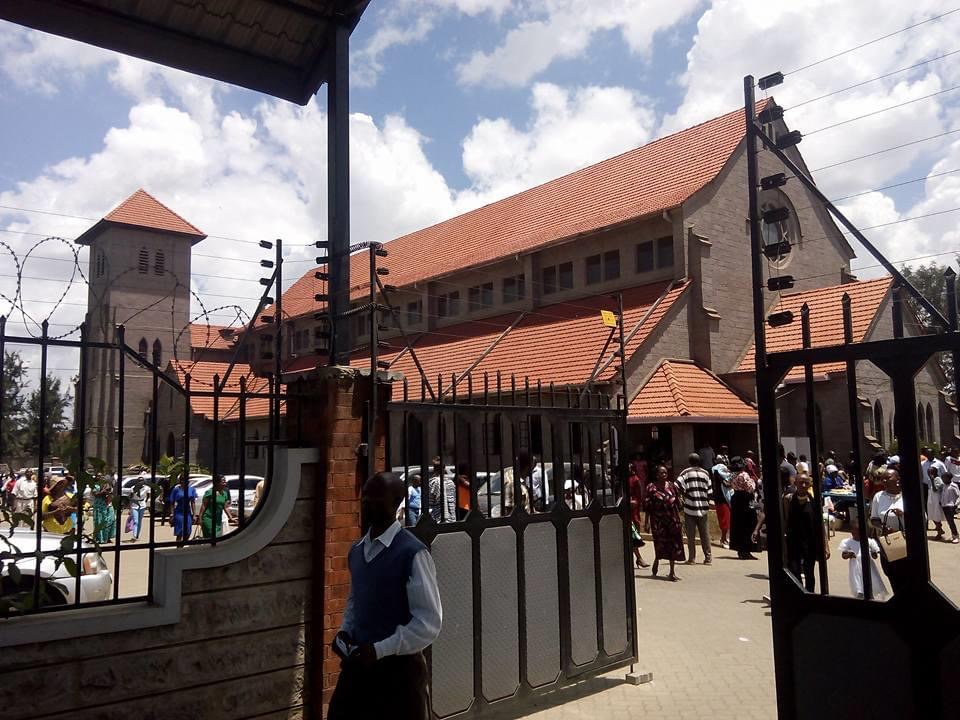
St. Stephen’s Cathedral, Nairobi

James Hannington was the first Bishop of Eastern Equatorial Africa

The church was founded as the diocese of Eastern Equatorial Africa (Uganda, Kenya, Tanzania) in 1884, with James Hannington as the first bishop; however, Protestant missionary activity had been present in the area since 1844, when Johann Ludwig Krapf, a Lutheran missionary of the Church Missionary Society, landed in Mombasa. The first Africans were ordained to the priesthood in 1885. In 1898, the diocese was split into two, with the new diocese of Mombasa governing Kenya and northern Tanzania (the other diocese later became the Church of Uganda); northern Tanzania was separated from the diocese in 1927. Mass conversions of Africans began as early as 1910. In 1955, the diocese's first African bishops, Festo Olang' and Obadiah Kariuki, were consecrated by the Archbishop of Canterbury, Geoffrey Fisher, in Uganda. In 1960, the province of East Africa, comprising Kenya and Tanzania, was formed with Leonard James Beecher as archbishop. The province was divided into two, with Festo Olang' being the first African archbishop of the new province of Kenya in 1970. Manasses Kuria was the Archbishop of Kenya from 1980 to 1994.

The Anglican Church of Kenya has been politically active throughout its history. As the official church of the colonial power, the Anglican missions enjoyed a privileged position, and Anglican preachers sharply denounced the Mau Mau rebellion in the 1950s. A number of Kikuyu loyalists who rejected Mau Mau were active church members. When President Daniel arap Moi moved to consolidate his power by suppressing free speech and limiting political opposition, Anglican leaders spoke out in defense of civil rights. David Gitari famously denounced election controls in a 1987 sermon that received considerable criticism from Moi supporters, but other church leaders soon joined in Gitari's criticisms. In 1990, Bishops Henry Okullu and Alexander Muge criticized the state's investigation of the murder of moderate foreign minister Robert Ouko. Bishop Muge was killed in a suspicious automobile accident later in the year after receiving open threats from a government official. His death spurred bishops Gitari, Okullu, and other Anglican leaders to take an even more active public role, vocally supporting the move to multi-party democracy. Gitari became archbishop in 1995 and continued the church's active engagement around civil rights, using his position to promote constitutional changes such as term limits and fairer elections.

== Membership ==
As of 2008 there were 4,500,000 Anglicans out of an estimated population of 43,000,000, that formed 10.6% of Kenyan's population. In 2017, peer-reviewed quantitative research found that the ACK reports more than 5 million total members while the churches' provided statistics reported 1,565,056 active members and 3,711,890 adherents.

== Archbishops ==
The primate of the church is the Archbishop of All Kenya. The see is fixed at Nairobi. He was previously styled "Archbishop of Kenya and Bishop of Nairobi", but the Diocese of Nairobi has now been divided into two. The Bishop of Nairobi has the geographically larger diocese, whilst there is a separate diocese of All Saints', based around All Saints' Cathedral, Nairobi. The primate's title is now "Primate and Archbishop of All Kenya". The current archbishop is the sixth since the Province of East Africa was divided into the Provinces of Kenya and Tanzania.

1. Festo Olang', 1970–1980
2. Manasses Kuria, 1980–1994
3. David Gitari, 1997–2002
4. Benjamin Nzimbi, 2002–2009
5. Eliud Wabukala, 2009–2016
6. Jackson Ole Sapit, 2016–present

Wabukala announced he would retire on 26 June 2016. An election for a new archbishop was held at a special meeting of synod at All Saints' Cathedral in Nairobi on 20 May 2016, and Jackson Ole Sapit was elected as the new primate. Sapit was installed as the sixth archbishop and primate of Kenya at All Saints' Cathedral on 3 July 2016.

== Structure ==
The polity of the Anglican Church of Kenya is episcopal church governance, which is the same as other Anglican churches. That is, headed by bishops from the Greek word, "episkopos", which means overseer or superintendent. The church maintains a system of geographical parishes organized into dioceses. It has been proposed since before 2005 that the quickly-increasing number of dioceses should be organised into about four or five internal ecclesiastical provinces, each headed by a metropolitan diocesan archbishop, with one primate over all. While a plan was apparently approved in 2008, as of 2018 this would seem not to have been implemented.

=== Dioceses ===
Mombasa

- Diocese of All Saints' Cathedral - current See of the Archbishop of Kenya
- Diocese of Garissa
- Diocese of Kajiado
- Diocese of Kitui
- Diocese of Machakos
- Diocese of Makueni
- Diocese of Malindi
- Diocese of Mombasa - the oldest diocese in Kenya
- Diocese of Nairobi - formerly the See of the Archbishop of Kenya
- Diocese of Taita-Tavita
- Episcopate of the Armed Forces

Maseno

- Diocese of Bondo
- Diocese of Bungoma
- Diocese of Butere
- Diocese of Maseno East
- Diocese of Maseno North
- Diocese of Maseno South
- Diocese of Maseno West
- Diocese of Nambale
- Diocese of Katakwa
- Diocese of Mumias
- Diocese of Southern Nyanza

Mount Kenya

- Diocese of Embu
- Diocese of Kirinyaga
- Diocese of Marsabit
- Diocese of Mbeere
- Diocese of Meru
- Diocese of Mount Kenya Central
- Diocese of Mount Kenya East
- Diocese of Mount Kenya South
- Diocese of Mount Kenya West
- Diocese of Murang'a South
- Diocese of Thika

Nakuru

- Diocese of Eldoret
- Diocese of Kapsabet
- Diocese of Kericho
- Diocese of Kitale
- Diocese of Maralal
- Diocese of Nakuru
- Diocese of Nyahururu
- Baringo Missionary Area
- Lodwar Missionary Area

Each diocese is divided into archdeaconries, each headed by an archdeacon, who is a priest. The archdeaconries are further subdivided into parishes, headed by a rector. Parishes are subdivided into sub-parishes, headed by lay readers.

== Worship and liturgy ==
The Anglican Church of Kenya, like all Anglican churches, embraces the three traditional Orders of ministry: deacon, priest, and bishop. A local variant of the Book of Common Prayer is used.

== Doctrine and practice ==
The center of the Anglican Church of Kenya's teaching is the life and resurrection of Jesus Christ. The basic teachings of the church, or catechism, includes:

- Jesus Christ is fully human and fully God. He died and was resurrected from the dead.
- Jesus provides the way of eternal life for those who believe.
- The Old and New Testaments of the Bible were written by people "under the inspiration of the Holy Spirit". The Apocrypha are additional books that are used in Christian worship, but not for the formation of doctrine.
- The two great and necessary sacraments are Holy Baptism and Holy Eucharist
- Other sacramental rites are confirmation, ordination, marriage, reconciliation of a penitent, and unction.
- Belief in heaven, hell, and Jesus's return in glory.

The threefold sources of authority in Anglicanism are scripture, tradition, and reason. These three sources uphold and critique each other in a dynamic way. This balance of scripture, tradition and reason is traced to the work of Richard Hooker, a sixteenth-century apologist. In Hooker's model, scripture is the primary means of arriving at doctrine and things stated plainly in scripture are accepted as true. Issues that are ambiguous are determined by tradition, which is checked by reason.

=== Ecumenical relations ===
Like many other Anglican churches, the Anglican Church of Kenya is a member of the ecumenical World Council of Churches. In October 2009, the Kenyan Church's leadership reacted to the Vatican's proposed creation of personal ordinariates for disaffected traditionalist Anglicans by saying that although he welcomed ecumenical dialogue and shared moral theology with the Catholic Church, the current GAFCON structures already meet the spiritual and pastoral needs of conservative Anglicans in Africa.

== Anglican realignment ==
The Anglican Church of Kenya is a member of the Global Anglican Future Conference (GAFCON). They declared a state of impaired communion with the Episcopal Church of the United States over the question of allowing blessing of same-sex unions and non-celibate gay clergy, and have supported the Anglican Church in North America as a new province in creation of the Anglican Communion. However, there are dioceses of The Episcopal Church and of the Anglican Church of Kenya that continue to partner with one-another. The ACK is also the second member church of GAFCON to ordain women to the episcopate.

The second Global Anglican Future Conference was held at All Saints' Cathedral, Nairobi, from 21 October to 26 October 2013. The focus was the shared Anglican future, discussing the missionary theme, "Making Disciples of the Lord Jesus Christ".

The Anglican Church of Kenya was represented at GAFCON III, held in Jerusalem, on 17–22 June 2018, by a 75 members delegation, including Archbishop Jackson Ole Sapit. In 2021, Dioceses in Western Kenya broke with a moratorium imposed by GAFCON against the ordination of women as bishops when the Diocese of Bondo and the Diocese of Butere elected two women as bishops. This sparked controversy within the ACK as some clergy noted that conservatives claim "Western Kenya dioceses are liberal and are ordaining women. [But most] of the Kenyan Anglican dioceses are conservative,' [a cleric] added."

In October, 2025, after the GAFCON chairman, Laurent Mbanda, criticised the appointment of Dame Sarah Mullally as the new Archbishop of Canterbury and called on GAFCON affiliates to cut ties with the Diocese of Canterbury, Emily Onyango, a bishop in the Diocese of Bondo, offered her support for Sarah Mullally's appointment. While the Primate of Kenya, Jackson Ole Sapit, did not comment on the GAFCON statement, Francis Omondi, the bishop of the Diocese of Garissa, stated that the church's laws continue to reference communion with Canterbury and that he supports remaining in communion with Canterbury. Alphonce Mwaro Baya, the Bishop of the Diocese of Mombasa, also confirmed that a change to the ACK's constitution would be required to separate from communion with Canterbury. In 2026, the Primate of Kenya did not attend the GAFCON conference in Abuja, Nigeria.

== See also ==
- H. Daudi Mokinyo
- List of the largest Protestant bodies
- List of archbishops of the Anglican Church of Kenya
- List of bishops of the Anglican Church of Kenya
- Religion in Kenya
