= Ordination of women in the Anglican Communion =

Women becoming Anglican clergy

The ordination of women in the Anglican Communion has been increasingly common in certain provinces since the 1970s. Several provinces, however, and certain dioceses within otherwise ordaining provinces, continue to ordain only men. Disputes over the ordination of women have contributed to the establishment and growth of conservative secession movements, such as the Anglican realignment and Continuing Anglican movements.

Some provinces within the Anglican Communion ordain women to the three traditional holy orders of deacon, priest and bishop. Other provinces ordain women as deacons and priests but not as bishops; others as deacons only. (Note: Technically the wording is that people are made deacons, ordained priests and consecrated as bishops but for simplicity the word ordained is used in this article and elsewhere.)

Within provinces that permit the ordination of women, approval of enabling legislation is largely a diocesan responsibility. There may, however, be individual dioceses that do not endorse the legislation or do so only in a modified form, as in those dioceses which ordain women only to the diaconate (such as the Diocese of Sydney in the Anglican Church of Australia), regardless of whether or not the ordination of women to all three orders of ministry is canonically possible. The Anglican Church of Australia General Synod legislated that women could be ordained as deacons (1985) and priests (1992) and the Appellate Tribunal agreed to bishops (2007) but left the decision to ordain women to those orders to individual dioceses.

== Overview ==
The current situation regarding women's ordination in the Anglican Communion can be seen in the following table, which lists 42 member churches (provinces) and the 5 extra-provincial churches:

Province	Ordination of female deacons permitted	First female deacon	Ordination of female priests permitted	First female priest	Consecration of female bishops permitted	First female bishop	Ref.
Alexandria	Yes	?	Yes	?	?	No	
Australia	1985	1986	1992	1992	2007 (Note: The church's Appellate Tribunal determined in 2007 that the consecration of female bishops was legal by virtue of the legislation adopted in 1992 to allow the ordination of female priests.)	2008	
Bangladesh	Yes	Yes	Yes	Yes	Yes	No	
Brazil	1983	1984	1983	1985	1983	2018	
Burundi	Yes	Yes	Yes	Yes	No	No	
Canada	1969	1969	1975	1976	1986	1994 (Note: Victoria Matthews, the first female bishop of the Anglican Church of Canada, was elected as a bishop in 1993 but not consecrated until 1994.)	
Central Africa	2023	No	2023	No	?	No	
Central America	Yes	Yes	Yes	Yes	Yes	No	
Chile	?	?	?	?	?	No	
Congo (Note: Sources conflict as to whether women can be or have been ordained to the presbyterate.)	Yes	Yes	Yes	Yes	No	No	
England	1985	1987	1992	1994	2014	2015	
Hong Kong	Yes	Yes	1971	1944 (Note: While the ordination of women was not permitted in Hong Kong until 1971, Li Tim-Oi was ordained by Ronald Hall in 1944. She later surrendered her licence, but she remained in the order of priesthood, which was recognised following 1971.)	No	No	
Indian Ocean	2002	Yes	2006	2006	No	No	
Ireland	1984	1987	1990	1990	1990	2013	
Japan	Yes	Yes	1998	1998	Yes	2022	
Jerusalem and the Middle East	Yes	Yes	2011	2011	No	No	
Kenya	Yes	1983	1990	1992	2014	2021	
Korea	2005	Yes	2008	Yes	No	No	
Melanesia	No	No	No	No	No	No	
Mexico	Yes	Yes	Yes	Yes	Yes	2021 (elected)	
Myanmar (Burma)	Yes	No	Yes	No	?	No	
Mozambique and Angola	Yes	Yes	Yes	Yes	Yes	2023	
New Zealand and Polynesia	Yes	Yes	1976 (Note: While the bill allowing for the ordination of women to the presbyterate was adopted and came into effect in 1976, it "had to lie on the table for a year to allow for an appeal".)	1977	Yes	1990	-
Nigeria	?	2010 (Note: While the ordination of women to the diaconate was initially permitted in 2010, there are competing claims about whether that had been reversed by 2021.)	No	No	No	No	
North India	Yes	Yes	Yes	1984	Yes	2024	
Pakistan	Yes	2000	No	No	No	No	
Papua New Guinea	No	No	No	No	No	No	
Philippines	Yes	Yes	Yes	Yes	Yes	No	
Rwanda	Yes	1996	Yes	?	No	No	
Scotland	1986	1986	1994	1994	2003	2018	
Southern Africa	1982	Yes	1992	1996	Yes	2012	
South America	Yes	Yes	2015	2015	No	No	
South East Asia	No	No	No	No	No	No	
South India	Yes	Yes	Yes	Yes	Yes	2013	
South Sudan	2000	Yes	2000	Yes	2000	2016	
Sudan	2000	Yes	2000	Yes	2000	No	
Tanzania	Yes	Yes	Yes	Yes	Yes	No	
Uganda	Yes	1983	Yes	Yes	Yes	No	
United States	1970	Yes	1976	1974 (Note: While the ordination of women to the presbyterate was not explicitly permitted in the United States until 1976, 11 women (later known as the Philadelphia Eleven) were ordained as priests in 1974 and 4 women (the Washington Four) were so ordained in 1975. The church initially rejected their ordinations as invalid, but later recognised them as "valid but irregular".)	1976	1989	
Wales	1980	1980	1996	1997	2013	2017	
West Africa	1987	1987	2000	Yes	No	No	
West Indies	1992	1994	1995	1996	2019	No	
Bermuda (extra-provincial) (Note: This church is not a province of the Anglican Communion, but is rather an extra-provincial church under the metropolitical oversight of the Archbishop of Canterbury.)	Yes	Yes	2009	Yes	?	Yes	
Ceylon (Sri Lanka; extra-provincial)	Yes	2003	Yes	2006	?	Yes	
Falkland Islands (extra-provincial) (Note: This church is not a province of the Anglican Communion, but is rather an extra-provincial church under the episcopal authority of the Archbishop of Canterbury acting as Bishop of the Falkland Islands.)	Yes	Yes	Yes	2023	Yes	Yes	
Portugal (extra-provincial)	Yes	1997	Yes	Yes	?	Yes	
Spain (extra-provincial)	Yes	Yes	Yes	Yes	?	Yes	

Note that provinces are categorised above according to the overall provincial policy on the ordination of women. In provinces where individual dioceses have considerable autonomy (e.g. the Anglican Church of Australia), some dioceses may be less permissive than the province overall.

== Ordination of priests ==
=== Hong Kong and Macao ===
The first woman ordained to the priesthood in the Anglican Communion was Florence Li Tim-Oi, who was ordained on 25 January 1944 by Ronald Hall, Bishop of Victoria, Hong Kong, in response to the crisis among Anglican Christians in China caused by the Japanese invasion. To avoid controversy, she resigned her licence (though not her priestly orders) after the end of the war.

In 1971, the Synod of Hong Kong and Macao became the first Anglican province to officially permit the ordination of women to the priesthood. Jane Hwang and Joyce M. Bennett were ordained as priests by Gilbert Baker, Bishop of Hong Kong and Macao on 28 November 1971. At the same time, Li Tim-Oi was officially recognised again as a priest.

=== United States ===
In 1974, in the United States, 11 women (known as the "Philadelphia Eleven") were controversially ordained to the priesthood in Philadelphia, Pennsylvania, by three retired Episcopal Church bishops (Daniel Corrigan, Robert L. DeWitt and Edward R. Welles II). Four more women (the "Washington Four") were ordained in 1975 in Washington D.C. by George W. Barrett, retired Bishop of Rochester, New York. All of these ordinations were ruled "irregular" because they had been done without the authorisation of the Episcopal Church's General Convention. The ordinations were regularised in 1976 following the approval by the General Convention of measures to provide for the ordination of women to the priesthood and the episcopate. The first regular ordination occurred on 1 January 1977, when Jacqueline Means was ordained at the Episcopal Church of All Saints, Indianapolis.

=== Canada ===
In 1975, the General Synod of the Anglican Church of Canada (ACC) passed enabling legislation for women priests; the first six women priests in the ACC were ordained on 30 November 1976.

=== New Zealand ===
In 1977, the Anglican Church in New Zealand ordained five female priests.

=== Kenya ===
In 1980, the Anglican Church of Kenya agreed in principle that women could be ordained and that each diocese was to be autonomous in taking up the issue. In 1983, Henry Okullu, bishop of the Diocese of Maseno South in the Anglican Church of Kenya, ordained Lucia Okuthe as a priest. In the same year, William Rukirande, Bishop of Kigezi in the Church of Uganda, ordained three women as priests, Monica Sebidega, Deborah Micungwa Rukara, and Margaret Kizanye Byekwaso. Formal legislation for the ordination of women as priests was ultimately approved in both provinces in 1990.

=== Ireland ===
In 1990, Janet Catterall became the first woman ordained an Anglican priest in Ireland.

=== Australia ===
In 1992, the general synod of the Anglican Church of Australia approved legislation allowing dioceses to decide whether to ordain women to the priesthood. In the same year, 90 women were ordained in Australia and three others who had been ordained overseas were recognised.

While the ordination of women to the diaconate and priesthood had been raised in Australia in the 1960s and earlier; during the 1980s and 1990s there was significant ongoing debate in the Anglican Church of Australia about the ordination of women, especially to the priesthood, with bills put to the General Synod to enable ordination. The debate and arguments for and against were reported in the mainstream media as well as in church newspapers. Individual bishops, dioceses, clergy and churches spoke and wrote publicly about their support or rejection of female deacons and priests. Advocacy organisations formed for and against the proposal to ordain women including (for) Anglican Women Concerned, Action Group for Women's Ordination, the Movement for the Ordination of Women, Men, Women and God: Christians for Biblical Equality, Women and Holy Orders? in Adelaide and (against) Women Against the Ordination of Women, Association for Apostolic Ministry, Equal but Different, the Union of Anglican Catholic Priests, South Australia and the Campaign for the Historic Anglican Male Priesthood in Brisbane.

By 2025 only two (Sydney and North-West Australia) of the 23 dioceses have never ordained women as priests. A third diocese (Armidale) has ordained two women as priests but limited their service to the Anglican girls school and does not ordain women as priests for its churches.

=== South Africa ===
Also in 1992, the Anglican Church of Southern Africa authorised the ordination of women as priests and, in September that year, Nancy Charton, Bride Dickson and Sue Groves were ordained in the Diocese of Grahamstown.

=== England ===
Also in 1992, the General Synod of the Church of England passed a vote to ordain women as priests; however, it proved controversial. The Act of Synod, passed in 1993, along with further legislation, allowed parishes to not accept ordained women. In 1994 England's first thirty-two women were ordained as priests. The experience of the first women priests and their congregations was the premise of the television programme The Vicar of Dibley. The legality of the ordination of women in the Church of England was challenged in civil courts by Paul Williamson and others. By 2004, one in five Church of England priests were women.

=== Barbados/West Indies ===
In 1994, in the Diocese of Barbados, Sonia Hinds and Beverley Sealy became the first women to be ordained as deacons in the Church in the Province of the West Indies on 25 July, the Feast of St James. On 31 May 1996, on the Feast of the Visitation of Mary to Elizabeth, both women were ordained as priests. Rufus Brome, the first Barbadian-born bishop, presided at both ordinations at the Cathedral of St Michael and All Angels in Bridgetown, Barbados.

=== Philippines ===
In 1997, Rosalina Villaruel Rabaria became the first woman ordained in the Philippines Independent Church, in the Diocese of Aklan and Capiz on 9 February.

=== South America ===
In 2015, Bolivia became the first diocese in the Anglican Province of South America (formerly known as the Southern Cone) to ordain women as priests.

Also in 2015, Susana Lopez Lerena, Cynthia Myers Dickin, and Audrey Taylor Gonzalez became the first women Anglican priests ordained in the Diocese of Uruguay.

== Ordination of bishops ==
=== Episcopal Church in the United States ===
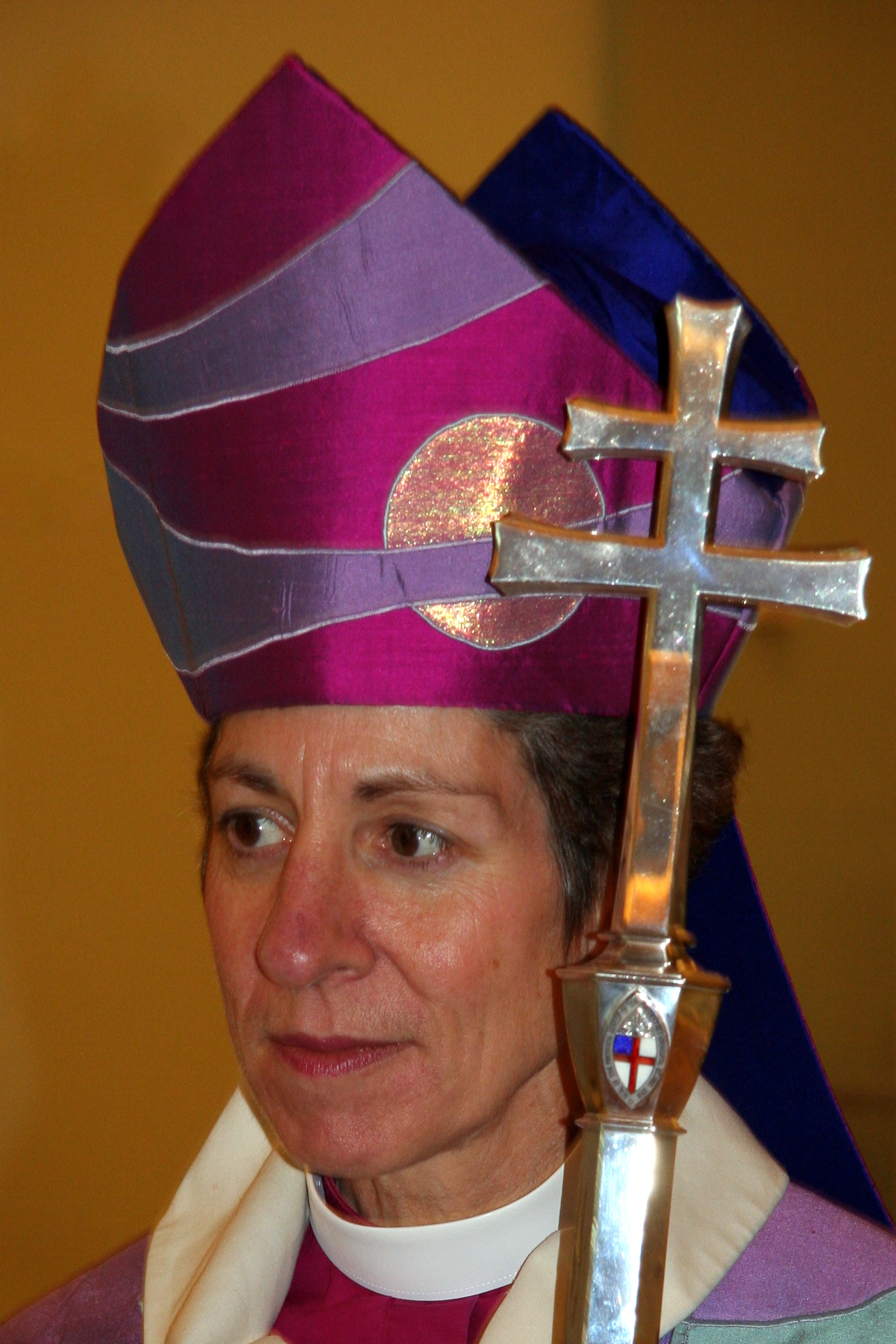
Katharine Jefferts Schori, Presiding Bishop of the Episcopal Church (2006–2015), the first female primate in the Anglican Communion

The first woman to become a bishop in the Anglican Communion was Barbara Harris, who was ordained suffragan bishop of Massachusetts in the United States in February 1989. As of August 2017, 24 women have since been elected to the episcopate across the church. The election in December 2009 and consecration on 15 May 2010 of Mary Glasspool, who is openly gay and lives with her partner of 20 years, as a suffragan bishop in the Diocese of Los Angeles attracted attention owing to the continued controversy over gay bishops in Anglicanism.

The Episcopal Church in the United States also elected the first woman to become a primate (or senior bishop of a national church), Katharine Jefferts Schori, who was elected as 26th Presiding Bishop and Primate of the Episcopal Church at the 2006 General Convention for a nine-year term (2006-2015).

=== Anglican Church in Aotearoa, New Zealand, and Polynesia ===
The Anglican Church in Aotearoa, New Zealand and Polynesia first ordained women as priests in 1977 and was the first Anglican province to elect a woman as a diocesan bishop when, in 1989, Penny Jamieson was elected Bishop of Dunedin. She retired in 2004. In 2008 the Diocese of Christchurch elected Victoria Matthews, former Bishop of Edmonton in the Anglican Church of Canada, as 8th Bishop of Christchurch. In 2013, Helen-Ann Hartley became the first woman ordained in the Church of England to become a bishop when she was elected as Bishop of Waikato and joint diocesan bishop in the Diocese of Waikato and Taranaki. From 2017 to 2022, the Rt Rev Dr Eleanor Sanderson had served as Assistant Bishop of Wellington. Wai Quayle became the first indigenous woman to be elected a bishop in the Anglican Church in Aotearoa, New Zealand and Polynesia in 2019.

=== Anglican Church of Canada ===
Following the first ordinations of women as priests in 1976, the first woman to become a bishop in the Anglican Church of Canada was Victoria Matthews. She was elected suffragan bishop in the Diocese of Toronto on 19 November 1993 and was ordained to the episcopate on 12 February 1994. She later was the first woman to become a diocesan bishop in Canada when she was elected as Bishop of Edmonton in 1997, an office she held until 2007 when she resigned. She was subsequently elected Bishop of Christchurch in the Anglican Church in Aotearoa, New Zealand, and Polynesia in 2008.

Since Matthews' election, fifteen more women have been elected to the episcopate in Canada. They are Ann Tottenham (suffragan, Toronto, 1997; retired 2005); Sue Moxley (suffragan, Nova Scotia and Prince Edward Island, 2004; diocesan, 2007; retired 2014); Jane Alexander (diocesan, Edmonton, 2008); Linda Nicholls (suffragan, Toronto, 2008; diocesan, Huron, 2016; Primate of the Anglican Church of Canada, 2019); Barbara Andrews (Bishop Suffragan to the Metropolitan with responsibilities for the Anglican Parishes of the Central Interior, 2009); Lydia Mamakwa (Area Bishop for Northern Ontario within the Diocese of Keewatin, with special responsibility for the predominantly Aboriginal parishes of the area, 2010; subsequently Bishop of Mishamikoweesh, the church's Indigenous Spiritual Ministry with the status of a diocese, established in 2014); Melissa Skelton (diocesan, New Westminster, 2013), Mary Irwin-Gibson (diocesan Bishop of Montreal, 2015), Riscylla Shaw (suffragan, Toronto, 2017), Jenny Andison, (suffragan, Toronto, 2017), Anne Germond (diocesan, Algoma, 2017), Susan Bell (diocesan, Niagara, 5 May 2018), Lynne McNaughton (diocesan, Kootenay, January 2019), Lesley Wheeler-Dame (coadjutor, Yukon, 2019), Sandra Fyfe (diocesan, Nova Scotia and Prince Edward Island, 2020), and Clara Plamondon (diocesan, Territory of the People, 2023).

On 12 May 2018, Melissa Skelton was elected Metropolitan (which includes the title 'Archbishop') of the Ecclesiastical Province of British Columbia and Yukon.

=== Anglican Church of Australia ===
The Anglican Church of Australia began to ordain women as priests in 1992 and in the late 1990s embarked on a protracted debate over the ordination of women as bishops, a debate that was ultimately decided through the church's appellate tribunal, which ruled on 28 September 2007 that there is nothing in the church's constitution that would prevent the consecration of a woman priest as a bishop in a diocese which by ordinance has adopted the law of the Church of England Clarification Canon 1992, which paved the way for the ordination of women as priests.

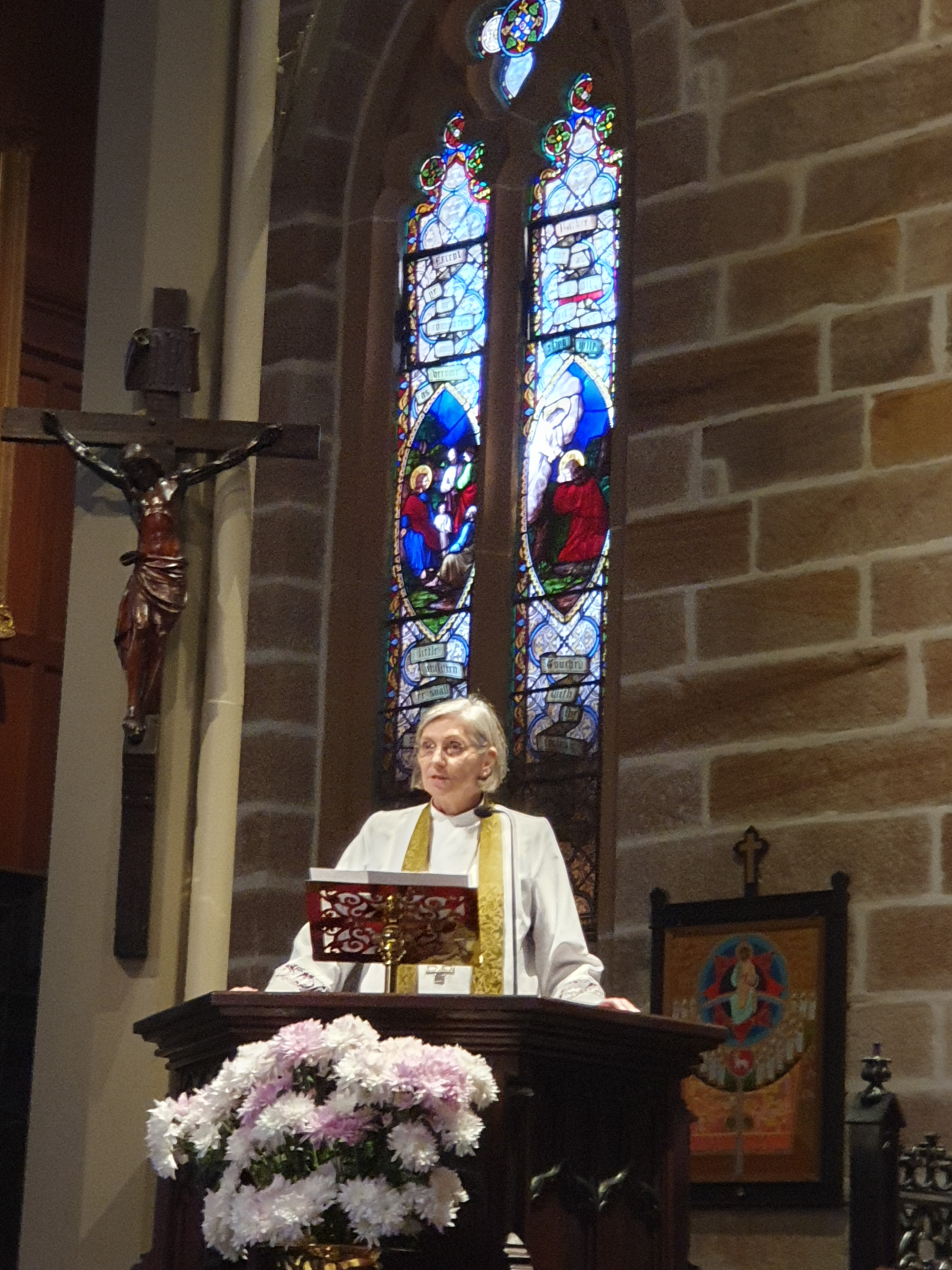
Archbishop of Perth, Kay Goldsworthy, preaching in Sydney for the 40th anniversary of the Movement for the Ordination of Women

Following the agreement at the April 2008 bishops' conference of the "Women in the Episcopate" protocol for the provision of pastoral care to those who reject the ministry of bishops who are women, the first women ordained as bishops were Kay Goldsworthy (assistant bishop, Diocese of Perth) on 22 May 2008 (subsequently elected 12th bishop of the Diocese of Gippsland in the south-eastern Australian state of Victoria and installed on 21 March 2015; and Barbara Darling (assistant bishop, Anglican Diocese of Melbourne) on 31 May 2008.

More women have since been ordained as bishops: Genieve Blackwell, Regional Bishop in Wagga Wagga and subsequently an assistant bishop in the Diocese of Melbourne (31 March 2012); Alison Taylor, Bishop of the Southern Region, Diocese of Brisbane (6 April 2013); Sarah Macneil, Bishop of Grafton, who was the first woman diocesan bishop (1 March 2014); Kate Wilmot, assistant bishop in the Diocese of Perth (6 August 2015); Sonia Roulston, assistant bishop, Diocese of Newcastle (May 2018); Kate Prowd, assistant bishop, Diocese of Melbourne (October 2018); Denise Ferguson, assistant bishop, Diocese of Adelaide (21 July 2019); Carol Wagner, assistant bishop, Diocese of Canberra and Goulburn (2020); Sarah Plowman, Assistant Bishop and Bishop for the Northern Region, Brisbane (21 June 2024); Sophie Relf-Christopher, Assistant Bishop, Adelaide (15 August 2024); and Vanessa Bennett, Assistant Bishop, Canberra and Goulburn (24 August 2024).

On 29 August 2017, Kay Goldsworthy was elected Archbishop of Perth in the Province of Western Australia. On taking up her appointment on 10 February 2018, she became the first woman in the Anglican Communion appointed or elected to the office of archbishop.

=== Anglican Church of Southern Africa ===
The first woman to become a bishop in the Anglican Church of South Africa was Ellinah Ntombi Wamukoya, who was elected bishop of the Diocese of Swaziland on 18 July 2012 and ordained and installed on 10 November 2012. Her appointment was closely followed by the election, on 12 October 2012, of Margaret Vertue as bishop of the Diocese of False Bay. She was consecrated and installed on 19 January 2013.

=== Church in Wales ===
On 2 April 2008, the Governing Body of the Church in Wales considered but did not pass, a bill to enable women to be ordained as bishops. Though the bill was passed by the House of Laity (52 to 19) and the House of Bishops (unanimously), it failed by three votes (27 to 18) to secure the required minimum two-thirds majority in the House of Clerics. However, the Church in Wales decisively ended the role of provincial bishop, whose responsibility was to minister to opponents. On 12 September 2013, the Governing Body passed a bill to enable women to be ordained as bishops subject to the finalisation of a Code of Practice, ultimately published in September 2014.

On 2 November 2016, Joanna Penberthy was elected as Bishop of St David's in the Church in Wales. She was consecrated in January 2017 and enthroned in St Davids Cathedral in February 2017. On 25 February 2017 June Osborne was elected 72nd Bishop of Llandaff. She was consecrated on 15 July 2017 and installed at Llandaff Cathedral on 22 July 2017. In 2022, Mary Stallard's consecration as Assistant Bishop of Bangor made the Welsh Bench of Bishops majority-female, a situation presumed to be a first in any Anglican church.

=== Church of England ===
Since the ordination of women as priests began in 1994, dioceses generally have on the Bishop's senior staff a Dean of Women's Ministry (or Bishop's Adviser in Women's Ministry or similar), whose role it is to advocate for clergy who are women and to ensure the Bishop is appraised of issues peculiar to their ministry. These Advisers meet together in a National Association (NADAWM).

In 2005, 2006, and 2008, the General Synod of the Church of England voted in favour of removing the legal obstacles preventing women from becoming bishops. The process did not progress quickly due to problems in providing appropriate mechanisms for the protection of those who cannot accept this development. On 7 July 2008 the synod held a more-than-seven-hour debate on the subject and narrowly voted in favour of a national statutory code of practice to make provision for opponents, though more radical provisions (such as separate structures or overseeing bishops) proposed by opponents of the measure failed to win the majority required across each of the three houses (bishops, clergy, and laity).

The task of taking this proposal further fell largely to a revision committee established by the synod to consider the draft legislation on enabling women to become bishops in the Church of England. When, in October 2009, the revision committee released a statement indicating its proposals would include a plan to vest some functions by law in male bishops who would provide oversight for those unable to receive the ministry of women as bishops or priests, there was widespread concern both within and outside the Church of England about the appropriateness of such legislation. In the light of the negative reaction to the proposal, the revision committee subsequently announced the abandonment of this recommendation.

The synod, meeting in York from 9 to 12 July 2010, considered a measure that again endorsed the ordination of women as bishops. The measure included provisions for individual bishops to allow alternative oversight for traditionalists who object to serving under them, but opponents of the measure argued for stronger provisions. A compromise plan put forward by the archbishops of Canterbury and York (involving the creation of a mechanism providing for "co-ordinate jurisdiction" in parishes refusing the ministry of a bishop who is a woman whereby another bishop would fulfil episcopal function) was endorsed by the House of Bishops and the House of Laity but narrowly failed (90 votes against to 85 in favour) in the House of Clergy. The draft measure, with only minor amendments, passed in all three houses on 12 July 2010, to be considered by individual dioceses. The measure was approved by 42 of the 44 dioceses, but an amendment by the House of Bishops, offering further concessions to opponents, meant that many proponents of the measure would have reluctantly voted it down, and the synod at York in July 2012 adjourned the decision to a later synod.

On 20 November 2012, the General Synod failed to pass the proposed legislation for the ordination of women as bishops. The measure was lost after narrowly failing to achieve the two-thirds majority required in the House of Laity after being passed by the House of Bishops and the House of Clergy.

At its meeting on 7 February 2013, the House of Bishops decided that eight senior women clergy, elected regionally, would participate in all meetings of the house until such time as there were six women who were bishops sitting as of right.

In May 2013, the House of Bishops expressed its commitment "to publishing new ways forward to enable women to become bishops". In July 2013, the synod decided to reintroduce legislation to be addressed in November.

In November 2013, the General Synod approved a package of measures as the next steps to enable women to become bishops, generally welcoming a package of proposals outlined for Draft Legislation of Women in the Episcopate (GS 1924). The steering committee's package of proposals followed the mandate set by the July synod and included the first draft of a House of Bishops declaration and a dispute resolution procedure. The debate invited the synod to welcome the proposals and five guiding principles already agreed by the House of Bishops.

The General Synod again considered the matter in February 2014 and sent further draft legislation to all the dioceses of the Church of England. All dioceses that were able to meet within the necessary time frame (43 of 44) approved the draft legislation in time for it to be debated at the General Synod in York in July 2014. That legislation passed all three houses of General Synod on 14 July 2014, achieving the two-thirds majority required in all three. It gained the necessary parliamentary approvals and royal assent in the subsequent months and was finally approved by the General Synod on 17 November 2014.

The first woman to be ordained as a bishop in the Church of England was Libby Lane, whose appointment as Bishop of Stockport (a suffragan see in the Diocese of Chester) was announced on 17 December 2014. She was consecrated at York Minster on 26 January 2015 (the Feast of the Conversion of St Paul). Alison White was appointed Bishop of Hull (suffragan, Diocese of York) on 25 March 2015 and consecrated at York Minister on 3 July 2015 (the Feast of St Thomas).

The third woman to be appointed bishop, and the first to be a diocesan bishop, was Rachel Treweek, whose appointment as 43rd Bishop of Gloucester was announced on 26 March 2015. She became Bishop of Gloucester on 15 June 2015 following the confirmation of her election. On 22 July 2015 (the Feast of St Mary Magdalene) she and Sarah Mullally (Bishop of Crediton, a suffragan see in the Diocese of Exeter) were the first women to be ordained as bishops at Canterbury Cathedral. Pursuant to the Lords Spiritual (Women) Act 2015, which makes time-limited provision for vacancies among the Lords Spiritual (the bishops who are members of the House of Lords) to be filled by diocesan bishops who are women, Treweek also become the first to sit in the House of Lords, where she was introduced on 26 October 2015.

On 30 June 2015, it was announced that Ruth Worsley would be Bishop of Taunton (suffragan, Diocese of Bath and Wells). On 2 July 2015 the appointment of Anne Hollinghurst as the Bishop of Aston (suffragan, Diocese of Birmingham) was announced. Both were consecrated at St Paul's Cathedral, London, on 29 September (the Feast of St Michael and All Angels).

On 2 September 2015, it was announced that Christine Hardman would be 12th Bishop of Newcastle and, therefore, the second woman to be a diocesan bishop in the Church of England and the first in the Province of York. Hardman became Bishop of Newcastle upon the confirmation of her election on 22 September 2015; she was consecrated on 30 November 2015 at York Minster. Hardman also sits in the House of Lords.

On 26 November 2015, the appointment of Karen Gorham as Bishop of Sherborne (suffragan, Diocese of Salisbury) was announced. She was the first woman to be consecrated in Westminster Abbey, at a service that took place on 24 February 2016.

Between 2014 and 2018, almost half of new bishop appointments in the Church of England were women.

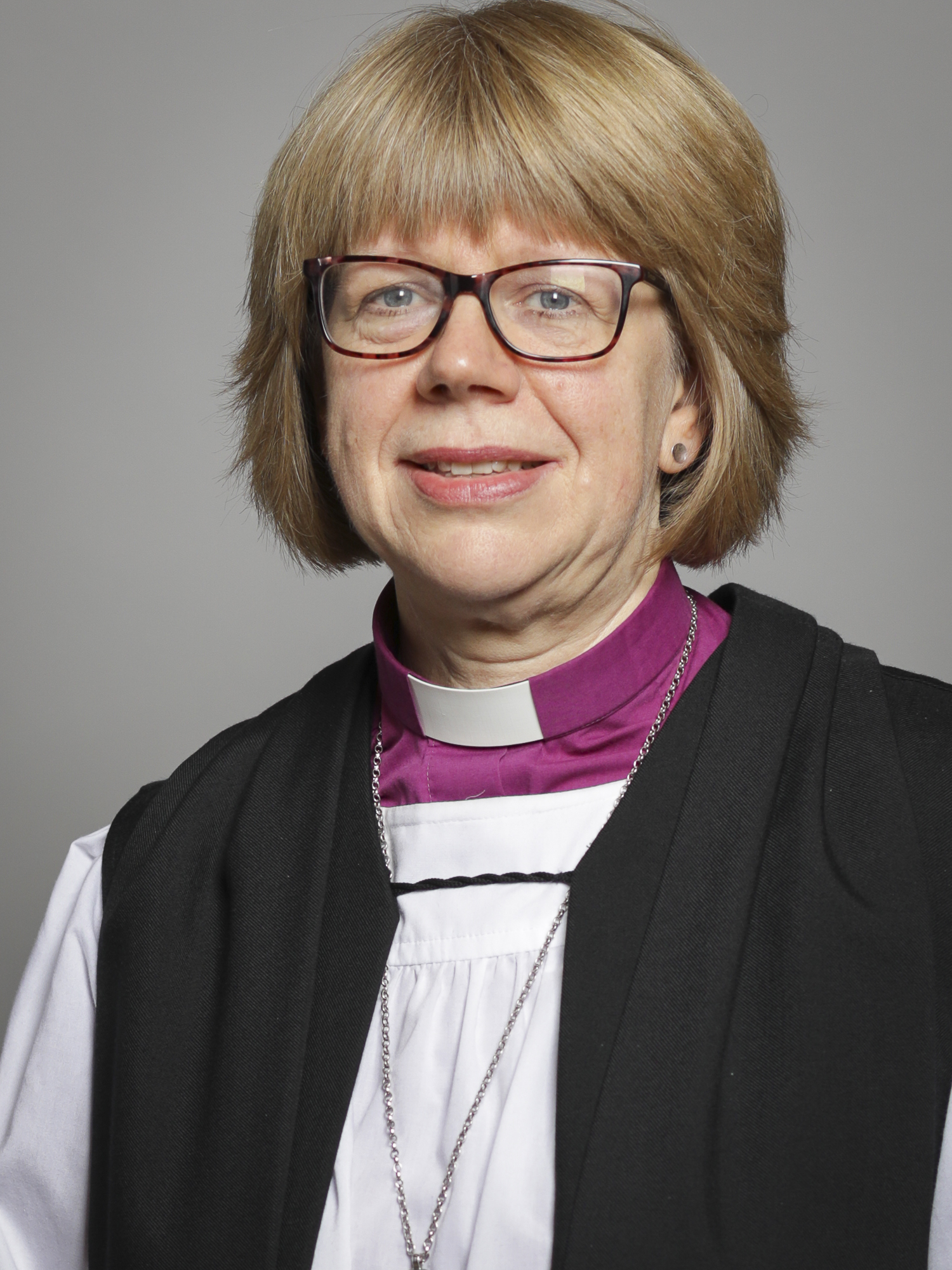
Dame Sarah Mullally

Dame Sarah Mullally was announced on 3 October 2025 as 106th Archbishop of Canterbury, making her the first woman to be appointed to lead the Church of England in that role.

=== Church of Ireland ===
The Church of Ireland approved the ordination of women as priests and bishops in 1990 and the first women were ordained as priests on 24 June that year. The first woman in the episcopate was Pat Storey, who was consecrated Bishop of Meath and Kildare on 1 December 2013. On 19 September 2013, Storey was chosen by the House of Bishops to succeed Richard Clarke as Bishop of Meath and Kildare. She was consecrated to the episcopate at Christ Church Cathedral, Dublin, on 30 November 2013. She is the first woman to be elected as a bishop in the Church of Ireland and the first woman to be an Anglican Communion bishop in Ireland and Great Britain.

=== Church of North India ===
In 2024, Violet Nayak became the first woman in the episcopate of the Church of North India when she was consecrated for the diocese of Phulbani.

=== Church of South India ===
The Church of South India has admitted women to holy orders since 1984. Eggoni Pushpa Lalitha was the first woman elected as a bishop on 25 September 2013. She was ordained and installed as bishop of the Diocese of Nandyal on 29 September 2013.

=== Episcopal Church of South Sudan ===
The Episcopal Church of South Sudan (formerly the Episcopal Church of South Sudan and Sudan until the creation, on 31 July 2017, of separate provinces for Sudan and South Sudan) provided for the ordination of women to all three orders of ministry in 2000. The first woman ordained as a bishop in the church was the Rt Rev Elizabeth Awut Ngor, who was consecrated as an assistant bishop in the Diocese of Rumbek on 31 December 2016. Hers was the first appointment of a woman as a bishop in any of the so-called GAFCON-aligned provinces of the Anglican Communion, which broadly resist the ordination of women as priests and bishops.

=== Scottish Episcopal Church ===
The Scottish Episcopal Church ordained its first women as priests in 1994, and in 2003 provided for the ordination of women as bishops. The nomination of Alison Peden as one of three nominees for election as Bishop of Glasgow and Galloway in January 2010 attracted wide attention. The first woman to be appointed was the Rev Canon Anne Dyer, who was elected Bishop of the Diocese of Aberdeen and Orkney by the Episcopal Synod of the Scottish Episcopal Church on 9 November 2017. She was consecrated on 1 March 2018.

=== Anglican Episcopal Church of Brazil ===
The first woman appointed as a bishop in the Anglican Episcopal Church of Brazil is the Right Rev. Marinez Santos Bassotto, who was elected as Bishop of the Diocese of the Amazon on 20 January 2018 and was ordained on 21 April 2018. She was elected as Presiding Bishop on 13 November 2022.

=== Anglican Church of Kenya ===
The first woman appointed as a bishop in the Anglican Church of Kenya (ACK) is Emily Onyango who was elected Assistant Bishop of Bondo Diocese in January 2021. Rose Okeno, age 54, became the second female bishop and the first full bishop in the history of the ACK on 12 September 2021. She is the Anglican Bishop of Butere Diocese.

=== Anglican Church of Mexico ===
The first woman elected as a bishop in the Anglican Church of Mexico is Alba Sally Sue Hernández who was consecrated the bishop of the Diocese of Mexico in January 2022. She was elected primate in March 2026

=== Extraprovincial churches ===
In addition to the 42 provinces of the Anglican Communion, there are five Extra-provincial Anglican churches which function semi-autonomously under limited metropolitical oversight and are largely self-determining when it comes to the ordained ministry. Several have provided for the ordination of women as priests for some years. The extra-provincial churches are under the metropolitical leadership of the Archbishop of Canterbury. Since 2026, the Archbishop of Canterbuy has been Dame Sarah Mullally, the first woman to be metropolitan bishop of the extra-provincial churches.

The Episcopal Church of Cuba was the only extra-provincial church to ordain women as bishops, the first of whom was Nerva Cot Aguilera who was appointed as a bishop suffragan in 2007. Aguilera was appointed by the Metropolitan Council, the ecclesiastical authority for the Episcopal Church of Cuba which in January 2010 appointed Griselda Delgado del Carpio (who, along with Aguilera, was one of the first two women priests ordained in Cuba in 1986) as bishop coadjutor (assistant bishop with the right of succession). She was ordained to the episcopate on 7 February 2010 and installed as diocesan on 28 November 2010 following the retirement of Miguel Tamayo-Zaldívar, the interim bishop since 2005. The Episcopal Church of Cuba became a Diocese of The Episcopal Church in 2020.

== Controversies and breakaway groups ==
The ordination of women has been a controversial issue throughout the Anglican Communion. While the majority of the 41 provinces of the Anglican Communion ordain women as priests, and many have removed all barriers to women becoming bishops, some have taken formal or informal steps to provide pastoral care and support for those who cannot in conscience accept the ministry of women as priests and bishops. The Church of England, for example, has created the office of provincial episcopal visitor (colloquially known as "flying bishops") to minister to clergy, laity, and parishes who do not in conscience accept the ministry of women priests. These are suffragan bishops, appointed by the metropolitans, whose main purpose is to be available for this ministry.

There have been a number of protest groups established by conservative Anglicans who see the ordination of women as representative of a trend away from traditional or orthodox doctrine. A network for opponents of women's ordination called the Evangelical and Catholic Mission was established in 1976, and following the consecration of Barbara Harris, the first woman to become an Anglican bishop, in 1989, a group of 22 active and retired bishops established the Episcopal Synod of America, subsequently Forward in Faith North America. A sister organisation, Forward in Faith UK, was established in 1992.

There have also been a number of breakaway groups. Following the Congress of St. Louis in 1977, the Continuing Anglican Movement developed which sought to provide a formal ecclesiastical structure for those who felt unable to remain within mainstream Anglicanism. The larger groupings within the Continuing movement have been increasingly active since the publication by Pope Benedict XVI of the Apostolic Constitution Anglicanorum Coetibus in November 2009. Anglicanorum Coetibus provides a canonical structure for groups of former Anglicans to enter into full communion with the Roman Catholic Church, with formal structures in the form of personal ordinariates now in place in Great Britain, the United States, and Australia & Japan.

The long-term impact of Anglicanorum Coetibus on the Continuing movement is unknown, though there is a clear realisation that the loss of significant groups and their associated resources, especially to the Personal Ordinariate of the Chair of Saint Peter in the United States, necessitates the need for discussion and discernment between the ongoing affiliates of the movement.

== See also ==
- Anglican Group for the Ordination of Women to the Historic Ministry
- List of female Anglican bishops
- List of the first 32 women ordained as Church of England priests
- List of the first women ordained as priests in the Anglican Church of Australia in 1992
- Nan Arrington Peete
- Ordination of women in Protestant denominations
- Movement for the Ordination of Women
- Women and the Church
