= List of female Anglican bishops =

The following is a list of female Anglican bishops in diocesan, suffragan, area, and assistant roles.

== Primate Bishops ==
- Katharine Jefferts Schori (Episcopal Church, 2006–2015)
- Linda Nicholls (Anglican Church of Canada, 2019–2024)
  - Anne Germond (acting primate 2024–2025)
- Marinez Santos Bassotto (Anglican Episcopal Church of Brazil, 2022–present)
- Cherry Vann (Church in Wales, 2025–present)
- Sarah Mullally (Church of England, 1 January 2026 - )
- Alba Sally Sue Hernandez García (Church of Mexico, March 2026 – present)

== Metropolitans ==
Bishops or archbishops in charge of an internal ecclesiastical province but not being primates.

- Kay Goldsworthy (Archbishop of Perth, and Metropolitan of Western Australia, 2017–present)
- Melissa M. Skelton (Archbishop of New Westminster and Metropolitan of the Ecclesiastical Province of British Columbia and Yukon, 2018–2021)
- Anne Germond (Archbishop of Algoma and Metropolitan of the Ecclesiastical Province of Ontario, 2018–present)
- Lynne McNaughton (Archbishop of Kootenay and Metropolitan of the Ecclesiastical Province of British Columbia and Yukon, 2021–2024)

== Diocesan bishops ==
=== Anglican Church of Canada ===
==== Ontario ====
- Anne Germond ((Arch)Bishop of Algoma, 2017–present)
- Susan Bell (Bishop of Niagara, 2018–present)

==== Northern Lights ====
- Victoria Matthews (Bishop of Edmonton, 1997–2007)
- Jane Alexander (Bishop of Edmonton, 2008–2021)
- Helen Kennedy, Bishop of Qu'Appelle, 2022–present)
- Lydia Mamakwa (Indigenous Spiritual Ministry of Mishamikoweesh, 2014–present)
- Rachael Parker (Bishop of Brandon, 2024–present)

==== Canada ====
- Sandra Fyfe (Bishop of Nova Scotia and Prince Edward Island, 2020–present)
- Mary Irwin-Gibson (Bishop of Montreal, 2015–present)
- Sue Moxley (Bishop of Nova Scotia and Prince Edward Island, 2007–2014)

==== British Columbia and Yukon ====
- Melissa Skelton ((Arch)bishop of New Westminster, 2013–2021)
- Clara Plamondon (Territory of the People, 2024–present)
- Lesley Wheeler-Dame (Bishop of Yukon, 2019–present)
- Anna Greenwood-Lee (Bishop of British Columbia, 2021–present)

Barbara Andrews, Suffragan to the Metropolitan, was effectively diocesan bishop of the Territory of the People

=== Anglican Church in Aotearoa, New Zealand and Polynesia ===
- Wai Quayle (Te Pīhopa o Te Upoko o Te Ika, 2019–present)
- Victoria Matthews (Bishop of Christchurch, 2008–2018)
- Helen-Ann Hartley (Bishop of Waikato, 2014–2018; co-equal diocesan)
- Penny Jamieson (Bishop of Dunedin, 1989–2004)
- Anne van Gend (Bishop of Dunedin, 2024–present).

=== Anglican Church of Australia ===
- Kay Goldsworthy (Bishop of Gippsland, 2015–2017; Archbishop of Perth, 2017-present)
- Sarah Macneil (Bishop of Grafton, 2014–2018)

=== Anglican Church of Kenya ===
- Emily Onyango (Diocese of Bondo, 2021–present)
- Rose Okeno (Diocese of Butere, 2021-)

=== Anglican Church of Mozambique and Angola ===
- Filomena Tete Estevão (Bishop of Bom Pasteur, 2023–present)

=== Anglican Church of Southern Africa ===
- Ellinah Wamukoya (Bishop of Swaziland, 2012–2020)
- Margaret Vertue (Bishop of False Bay, 2012–2023)
- Vicentia Kgabe (Bishop of Lesotho, 2021–present)
- Dalcy Badeli Dlamini (Bishop of Swaziland, 2021–present)

=== Anglican Episcopal Church of Brazil ===
- Marinez Santos Bassotto (Bishop of Amazônia, 2018–present)
- Meriglei Borges Silva Simim (Bishop of Pelotas, 2020–present)
- Magda Cristina Guedes Pereira (Bishop of Paraná, 2021–present)

=== Episcopal Church of Cuba ===
- Griselda Delgado Del Carpio (Bishop of Cuba, 2010–present)

=== Church of England ===
Diocesan Bishops

- Rachel Treweek (Bishop of Gloucester, 2015–present)
- Christine Hardman (Bishop of Newcastle, 2015–2021)
- Sarah Mullally (Bishop of London, 2018–present)
- Viv Faull (Bishop of Bristol, 2018–present)
- Libby Lane (Bishop of Derby, 2019–present)
- Guli Francis-Dehqani (Bishop of Chelmsford, 2021–present)
- Helen-Ann Hartley (Bishop of Newcastle, 2023–present)
- Tricia Hillas (Bishop of Sodor and Man, 2024–present)

Acting Diocesan Bishops

- Ruth Worsley (Acting Bishop of Bath and Wells, 2020–2022)
- Debbie Sellin (Acting Bishop of Winchester, 2021–2023)
- Karen Gorham (Acting Bishop of Salisbury, 2021–2022)

De facto Diocesan Bishops

- Rose Hudson-Wilkin (Bishop of Dover, Bishop in Canterbury, 2019–present)

=== Church of Ireland ===
- Pat Storey (Bishop of Meath and Kildare, 2013–present)

=== Scottish Episcopal Church ===
- Anne Dyer (Bishop of Aberdeen and Orkney, 2018–present)

=== Church of South India ===
- Pushpa Lalitha (Bishop of Nandyal, 2013–present)

=== Church in Wales ===
- Joanna Penberthy (Bishop of St David's, 2016–2023)
- June Osborne (Bishop of Llandaff, 2017–2022)
- Cherry Vann (Bishop of Monmouth, 2020–present)
- Mary Stallard (Bishop of Llandaff, 2023–present)

=== Anglican Church of Mexico ===
- Alba Sally Sue Hernandez (Bishop of Mexico, 2022–present)

=== Episcopal Church (United States and other territories) ===
==== Province I ====
- Mary Adelia McLeod (Bishop of Vermont, 1993–2001)
- Geralyn Wolf (Bishop of Rhode Island, 1996–2012)
- Chilton R. Knudsen (Bishop of Maine, 1998–2008)
- Shannon MacVean-Brown (Bishop of Vermont, 2019–present)
- Julia Whitworth (Bishop of Massachusetts, 2024–present)

==== Province II ====
- DeDe Duncan-Probe (Bishop of Central New York, 2016–present)
- Carlye J. Hughes (Bishop of Newark, 2018–present)
- Sally French (Bishop of New Jersey, 2023–present)
- Kara Wagner Sherer (Bishop of Rochester, 2024–present)

==== Province III ====
- Mariann Budde (Bishop of Washington, 2011–present)
- Audrey Scanlan (Bishop of Central Pennsylvania, 2015–present)
- Susan Bunton Haynes (Bishop of Southern Virginia, 2020–present)
- Ketlen A. Solak (Bishop of Pittsburgh, 2021–present)
- Carrie Schofield-Broadbent (Bishop of Maryland, 2023–present)

==== Province IV ====
- Phoebe Alison Roaf (Bishop of West Tennessee, 2019–present)
- Glenda S. Curry (Bishop of Alabama, 2021–present)
- Ruth Woodliff-Stanley (Bishop of South Carolina, 2021–present)
- Shannon Rogers Duckworth (Bishop of Louisiana, 2022–present)
- Dorothy Sanders Wells (Bishop of Mississippi, 2024–present)

==== Province V ====
- Catherine Waynick (Bishop of Indianapolis, 1997–2017)
- Jennifer Baskerville-Burrows (Bishop of Indianapolis, 2017–present)
- Bonnie Perry (Bishop of Michigan, 2020–present)
- Paula Clark (Bishop of Chicago, 2022–present)
- Anne B. Jolly (Bishop of Ohio, 2023–present)
- Kristin Uffelman White (Bishop of Southern Ohio, 2024–present)

==== Province VI ====
- Kimberly Lucas (Bishop of Colorado, 2019–present)
- Martha Elizabeth Stebbins (Bishop of Montana, 2019–present)
- Betsey Monnot (Bishop of Iowa, 2021–present)

==== Province VII ====
- Cathleen Chittenden Bascom (Bishop of Kansas, 2019–present)

==== Province VIII ====
- Carolyn Tanner Irish (Bishop of Utah, 1996–2010)
- Mary Gray-Reeves (Bishop of El Camino Real, 2007–2020)
- Nedi Rivera (Provisional Bishop of Eastern Oregon, 2009–2015)
- Gretchen Rehberg (Bishop of Spokane, 2017–present)
- Susan Brown Snook (Bishop of San Diego, 2019–present)
- Jennifer Anne Reddall (Bishop of Arizona, 2019–present)
- Megan M. Traquair (Bishop of Northern California, 2019–present)
- Lucinda Ashby (Bishop of El Camino Real, 2020–present)
- Diana Akiyama (Bishop of Oregon, 2021–present)
- Elizabeth Bonforte Gardner (Bishop of Nevada, 2022–present)
- Phyllis A. Spiegel (Bishop of Utah, 2022–present)
- Melissa M. Skelton (Provisional Bishop of Olympia, 2023–present)

==== Other ====
- Ann Ritonia (Bishop of the Armed Services and Federal Ministries, 2023–present)

== Suffragan bishops ==
=== Anglican Church in Aotearoa, New Zealand and Polynesia ===
- Eleanor Sanderson (Anglican Diocese of Wellington Assistant Bishop, 2017–2022)
- Anashuya Fletcher was made Assistant Bishop in the Diocese of Wellington in April 2024

=== Anglican Church of Australia ===
- Kay Goldsworthy (Assistant Bishop, Anglican Diocese of Perth, 2008–2015)
- Barbara Darling (Assistant Bishop for Diocesan Ministries, Anglican Diocese of Melbourne, 2008–2009, Assistant Bishop (Eastern Region), Anglican Diocese of Melbourne, 2009–2015)
- Genieve Blackwell (Assistant Bishop, Anglican Diocese of Canberra and Goulburn, 2012–2015; Assistant Bishop (Marmingatha Episcopate), Anglican Diocese of Melbourne, 2015–present)
- Alison Taylor (Assistant Bishop (Southern Region), Anglican Diocese of Brisbane, 2013–2017)
- Kate Wilmot (Assistant Bishop, Anglican Diocese of Perth, 2015–present)
- Sonia Roulston (Assistant Bishop (Inland Episcopate), Anglican Diocese of Newcastle, 2018–present)
- Kate Prowd (Assistant Bishop (Oodthenong Episcopate), Anglican Diocese of Melbourne, 2018–present)
- Denise Ferguson (Assistant Bishop, Anglican Diocese of Adelaide, 2019–present)
- Carol Wagner (Assistant Bishop, Anglican Diocese of Canberra and Goulburn, 2020–2024)
- Sarah Plowman (Assistant Bishop and Bishop for the Northern Region, Brisbane, 2024–)
- Sophie Relf-Christopher (Assistant Bishop, Anglican Diocese of Adelaide, 2024-)
- Vanessa Bennett (Assistant Bishop, Canberra and Goulburn, 2024-)
- Tiffany Sparks (Assistant Bishop, Grafton 2026-)
- Megan Curlis-Gibson (Bishop of Merri, Melbourne, 2026-)

=== Anglican Church of Canada ===
- Victoria Matthews (Anglican Diocese of Toronto, 1993–1997)
- Ann Tottenham (Anglican Diocese of Toronto, 1997–2005)
- Sue Moxley (Anglican Diocese of Nova Scotia and Prince Edward Island, 2004–2007)
- Linda Nicholls (Anglican Diocese of Toronto, 2008–2016)
- Barbara Andrews (Bishop Suffragan to the Metropolitan {effectively, diocesan bishop} with responsibilities for the Territory of the People, 2009–2020)
- Riscylla Walsh Shaw (Bishop of Trent-Durham, 2016–present)
- Jenny Andison (Bishop of York-Credit Valley, 2016–present)
- Annie Ittoshat (Suffragan Bishop of the Arctic, 2019–present)
- Lucy Netser (Suffragan Bishop of the Arctic, 2019–present)

=== Church of England ===
==== Canterbury Province ====
- Sarah Mullally (Bishop of Crediton in the Diocese of Exeter, 2015–2018)
- Anne Hollinghurst (Bishop of Aston in the Diocese of Birmingham, 2015–present)
- Ruth Worsley (Bishop of Taunton in the Diocese of Bath and Wells, 2015–present)
- Karen Gorham (Bishop of Sherborne in the Diocese of Salisbury, 2016–present)
- Jan McFarlane (Bishop of Repton in the Diocese of Derby, 2016–2020)
- Jo Bailey Wells (Bishop of Dorking in the Diocese of Guildford, 2016–present)
- Guli Francis-Dehqani (Bishop of Loughborough in the Diocese of Leicester, 2017–2021)
- Rose Hudson-Wilkin (see above, Bishop of Dover, de facto diocesan bishop of Canterbury, 2019–present)
- Sarah Bullock (Bishop of Shrewsbury in the Diocese of Lichfield, 2019–present)
- Dagmar Winter (Bishop of Huntingdon in the Diocese of Ely, 2019–present)
- Debbie Sellin (Bishop of Southampton in the Diocese of Winchester, 2019–present)
- Ruth Bushyager (Bishop of Horsham in the Diocese of Chichester, 2020–present)
- Jane Mainwaring (Bishop of Hertford in the Diocese of St Albans, 2023–present)

==== York Province ====
- Libby Lane (Bishop of Stockport in the Diocese of Chester, 2015–2019)
- Alison White (Bishop of Hull in the Diocese of York, 2015–2022)
- Eleanor Sanderson (Bishop of Hull in the Diocese of York, 2022–present)
- Helen-Ann Hartley (Bishop of Ripon (Area bishop) in the Diocese of Leeds, 2018–present)
- Jill Duff (Bishop of Lancaster in the Diocese of Blackburn, 2018–present)
- Sarah Clark (Bishop of Jarrow in the Diocese of Durham, 2018–present)
- Emma Ineson (Bishop of Penrith in the Diocese of Carlisle, 2019–present)
- Flora Winfield (Bishop-designate of Selby in the Diocese of York, 2024–)

=== Province of the Episcopal Church of South Sudan ===
- Elizabeth Awut Ngor (Diocese of Rumbek, 2016–present)

=== Episcopal Church of Cuba ===
- Nerva Cot Aguilera (Diocese of Cuba, 2007–2010)

=== Episcopal Church (United States) ===
==== Province I ====
- Barbara Harris (Episcopal Diocese of Massachusetts, 1989–2003)
- Gayle Harris (Episcopal Diocese of Massachusetts, 2003–2022)
- Laura J. Ahrens (Episcopal Diocese of Connecticut, 2007–present)

==== Province II ====
- Catherine S. Roskam (Episcopal Diocese of New York, 1996–2012)

==== Province III ====
- Jane Dixon (Episcopal Diocese of Washington, 1992–2002)
- Carol Joy W.T. Gallagher (Episcopal Diocese of Southern Virginia, 2002–2005)
- Susan Goff (Episcopal Diocese of Virginia, 2012–present)
- Heather Cook (Episcopal Diocese of Maryland, 2014–2015)
- Jennifer Brooke-Davidson (Episcopal Diocese of Virginia, 2019–present)

==== Province IV ====
- Anne Hodges-Copple (Episcopal Diocese of North Carolina, 2013–present)

==== Province VII ====
- Dena Harrison (Episcopal Diocese of Texas, 2006–2019)
- Kathryn McCrossen Ryan (Episcopal Diocese of Texas, 2019–present)

==== Province VIII ====
- Mary Glasspool (Episcopal Diocese of Los Angeles, 2010–2016)
- Diane Jardine Bruce (Episcopal Diocese of Los Angeles, 2010–present)

== See also ==
- List of women bishops in the Anglican Church of Australia
- List of Anglican Communion dioceses
- Ordination of women in the Anglican Communion
