= Anglican dioceses of Nakuru =

Dioceses of the Anglican Church of Kenya

The Anglican dioceses of Nakuru are the Anglican presence in and around Nakuru, west-central, north-east and south-central Kenya; they are part of the Anglican Church of Kenya. The remaining dioceses of the Church area in the areas of Mombasa, of Maseno, and of Mount Kenya.

== Diocese of Nakuru ==
Diocese of Nakuru

Location
- Ecclesiastical province: Anglican Church of Kenya

Information
- Cathedral: Cathedral of the Good Shepherd, Nakuru

Current leadership
- Bishop: Antony Mambo

Nakuru diocese was founded in 1960 from the Diocese of Mombasa, and has since been split twice: to create the Diocese of Eldoret in 1983 and Nyahururu in 1998. It now includes the missionary area of Baringo, which has a suffragan bishop. The Cathedral of the Good Shepherd lies in Nakuru town.

=== Bishops of Nakuru ===
- 1961–1975: Neville Langford-Smith (retired)
- 1976–1980: Manasses Kuria (became Archbishop)
- 1980–?: Ladan Kamau
- 1990–2011: Stephen Mwangi
  - 2004–2008: Ole Sapit, Bishop of Kericho (became first bishop of that diocese)
- 2012- 2023: Joseph Muchai
- 2024- present: Antony Mambo
  - 2010–?: Peter Arok, Bishop of Twic East (separatist "missionary bishop" to South Sudan)
  - Musa Kamuren, Bishop of Baringo

== Diocese of Eldoret ==
Diocese of Elodret

Location
- Ecclesiastical province: Anglican Church of Kenya

Information
- Cathedral: St Matthew's Cathedral, Eldoret

Current leadership
- Bishop: Christopher Ruto

Website
- ackdioceseofeldoret.org

The Diocese of Eldoret was erected from Nakuru diocese in January 1983, and has since been split twice: to create Kitale in 1997 and Kapsabet in 2015.

=== Bishops of Eldoret ===
- 5 June 1983 – 1990: Alexander Muge
- 12 January 1992 – 1997: Stephen Kewasis (became first Bishop of Kitale)
- 1997–2010: Thomas Kogo
- 9 January 2011 – present: Christopher Ruto

== Diocese of Kitale ==
Diocese of Kitale

Location
- Ecclesiastical province: Anglican Church of Kenya

Information
- Cathedral: St Luke's Cathedral, Kitale

Current leadership
- Bishop: Stephen Kewasis

The Diocese of Kitale was erected from Eldoret diocese on 1 July 1997. Since 2017, Lodwar missionary area, geographically within Kitale diocese, has been under the care of a missionary bishop, suffragan to the Bishop of All Saints, the Primate of All Kenya.

=== Bishops of Kitale ===
- 1997–2018: Stephen Kewasis (previously Bishop of Eldoret)
  - 2017–present: Samson Tuliapus, assistant Bishop of Kapenguria
- 2018–present Emmanuel Chemengich

== Diocese of Nyahururu ==
Diocese of Nyahururu

Location
- Ecclesiastical province: Anglican Church of Kenya

Information
- Cathedral: Nyahururu Cathedral

Current leadership
- Bishop: Rtd Major Gachathi

Created from the Nakuru diocese on 1 January 1998, the Diocese of Nyahururu has since been split once: to create the Maralal missionary area (now diocese) in 2009.

=== Bishops of Nyahururu ===
- 1998–2013: Charles Gaikia
  - Jacob Lesuuda, Bishop of Maralal
- 2013– 2023: Stephen Kabora
- 2024- present: Rtd Major Gachathi

== Diocese of Kericho ==
Diocese of

Location
- Ecclesiastical province: Anglican Church of Kenya

Information
- Cathedral: Holy Trinity Pro-Cathedral, Kericho

Current leadership
- Bishop: Ernest Ng'eno

Website
- http://ackkcodioc.org

In 2008, Kericho diocese was erected from an area of Nakuru diocese for which Sapit had been responsible as suffragan since 2004. The area had previously been the Narok missionary area of Nakuru diocese.

=== Bishops of Kericho ===
- 1 May 2008 – 2016: Ole Sapit (elected Primate of Kenya)
- 2016–present: Ernest Ng'eno

== Diocese of Maralal ==
Diocese of

Location
- Ecclesiastical province: Anglican Church of Kenya

Information
- Cathedral: All Saints Pro-Cathedral, Maralal

Current leadership
- Bishop: Jacob Lesuuda

The Diocese was founded in 2015; it had become a missionary area in 2009, before which it was part of Nyahururu diocese. As a missionary area, it was under the care of Lesuuda (since 1 March 2009) as a suffragan of the Primate.

=== Bishops of Maralal ===
- 3 October 2015 – present: Jacob Lesuuda

== Lodwar Missionary Area ==
Cleti Ogeto has been the suffragan bishop of All Saints' Diocese for the Lodwar Missionary Area — the Bishop of Lodwar — since before 2010. The territory now in the missionary area was previously of Kitale diocese.

== Baringo Missionary Area ==
Musa Kamuren was consecrated a suffragan bishop of Nakuru diocese in 2015. He serves as Bishop of Baringo, which missionary area was and is part of the Diocese of Nakuru.

== Diocese of Kapsabet ==
Diocese of

Location
- Ecclesiastical province: Anglican Church of Kenya

Information
- Cathedral: St Barnabas Pro-Cathedral, Kapsabet

Current leadership
- Bishop: Paul Korir

Website
- ackkapsabetdiocese.org

The Diocese of Kapsabet was erected on 1 January 2016 from Eldoret diocese. Its pro-cathedral is St Barnabas, Kapsabet.

=== Bishops of Kapsabet ===
- 12 June 2016 – present: Paul Korir
