= James Jolley (priest) =

Dean of Cariboo

James Charles Jolley was dean of Cariboo from 1958 to 1970.

Jolley was educated at Wycliffe College, Toronto, and ordained in 1943. His first post was at Cut Knife, Saskatchewan. After this he was acting rector of St. James' Saskatoon then the incumbent at Wynyard. He came to St. Paul's Cathedral, Kamloops in 1950, serving as rector until becoming its first dean.
