= Daniel Omolo =

Bishop from Kenya

(Jonathan) Daniel Omolo was an Anglican bishop in Kenya during the last third of the twentieth century.

Omolo was educated at St. Paul's University, Limuru. He was ordained deacon in 1957 and priest in 1959. Omolo was archdeacon of Kisumu from 1972 to 1976 and Provost of St Stephen's Cathedral, Kisumu from 1976 to 1982. He was assistant bishop of Maseno South from 1982 to 1985 and Bishop of Maseno West from 1985 to 1991.
