= Diocese of Adelaide =

The Diocese of Adelaide, Archiocese of Adelaide, Bishop of Adelaide and Archbishop of Adelaide could refer to:

- The Anglican Diocese of Adelaide, led by the Anglican Bishop of Adelaide (1847–1970)
- The Anglican Archdiocese of Adelaide, led by the Anglican Archbishop of Adelaide (1970–present)
- The Roman Catholic Diocese of Adelaide, led by the Roman Catholic Bishop of Adelaide (1843–1887)
- The Roman Catholic Archdiocese of Adelaide, led by the Roman Catholic Archbishop of Adelaide (1887–present)
