= Lesuuda =

Lesuuda is a surname of Kenyan origin. Notable people with the surname include:

- Andrew Lesuuda (born 1991), Kenyan long-distance runner
- Jacob Lesuuda, Kenyan Anglican bishop
- Naisula Lesuuda (born 1984), Kenyan politician and women's rights activist
- Lmeriai Lesuuda, Clinical nutritionist; researcher
