= Nyang =

Nyang may refer to:

- Korean yang, also spelled nyang, the currency of Korea between 1892 and 1902
- Nyang languages, a group of Southern Bantoid languages spoken in Southwest Cameroon

== Places ==
- Nyang River, a major river in south-west Tibet
- Nyang Station, a sheep station in Western Australia

== People with the surname ==
- Aziz Corr Nyang (born 1984), Gambian footballer
- Haggai Nyang' (fl. 1990s–2000s), Kenyan Anglican bishop
- Sulayman S. Nyang (1944–2018), Gambian professor of African studies
