= Neville Langford-Smith =

Neville Langford-Smith (born Sydney 1910, died Castle Hill 1993) was an Anglican bishop in Kenya.

Langford-Smith was educated at Trinity Grammar School and the University of Sydney. In 1932 he went as a volunteer to Central Tanganyika. In 1937 he became a missionary with the CMS. After ordination he became headmaster of the Boys School in Dodoma. He was then in charge of the Teachers Training College in Marangu. In 1949, he went British Kenya Colony as supervisor of schools in Fort Hall, Embu, and Meru areas. His ministry and school administration in that region coincided with the anti-colonial Mau Mau Uprising. From his mission post in Weithaga, Langford-Smith sent regular reports about violence, including torture by British security forces, that informed church responses in Nairobi and London. Langfrod-Smith's reports reached the Archbishop of Canterbury and the London headquarters of the Church Missionary Society. One historian who evaluated his ministry during this time concluded that, "Langford-Smith’s ministry both aligned with and opposed colonial policy."

Langford-Smith became an Archdeacon in 1955; and in 1961 he was appointed the first Bishop of Nakuru.

He retired in 1975, subsequently returning to Sydney, where he served at Christ Church, St Ives.

He died on 26 October 1993.
