= Emily Onyango =

Kenyan Anglican priest

The Right Reverend Emily Onyango
- Church: Anglican Church of Kenya
- Diocese: Diocese of Bondo, Kenya

Personal details
- Denomination: Christian
- Residence: Limuru

Emily Awino Onyango is a Kenyan priest and the first female Anglican bishop in Kenya. She is also the first woman bishop in the Anglican Church in East and Central Africa. Prior to becoming a bishop, she taught theology at St. Paul's University in Limuru, Kenya. She attended the founding conference for the Circle of Concerned African Women Theologians in Ghana in 1989, and is a member of the Kenyan chapter of the Circle.

== Early life and education ==
Onyango was born into a Christian family. Onyango has a Bachelor of Divinity from Saint Paul's United Theological College in Limuru (1983) and a Master's degree from the Asian Centre of Theological Studies. She completed a PhD in history from the University of Wales in 2006, where she worked under John M. Lonsdale on the history of women's education in Kenya. Her thesis was titled "Luo women's negotiation of mission education: a critical analysis of Anglican women in Nyanza, Kenya from 1895". She also has a certificate in ecumenism from the Ecumenical Institute of Graduate Studies in Geneva.

== Career ==
Onyango was a lay reader at St Stephen's Cathedral in Kisumu before being appointed as a deacon in 1984. She was the second woman to be ordained a priest in the Anglican Church of Kenya (ACK) in 1986. In February 2018, she was appointed a Canon in Bondo Diocese.

Onyango has taught at St John's School of Theology in Kokise, Siaya County and was lecturer, academic dean and Vice Principal at St Andrews College in Kabare. She is a lecturer in church history and theology at St Paul's University in Limuru. Onyango was Dean of Students at St Paul's from 2000 to 2002. She is the chair of The Africa Centre for Biblical Equity, a Langham scholar and a founder of the Circle of Concerned African Women Theologians. She has written several articles and books on the history of theological education and women's education in Kenya.

=== Election as Bishop ===
Onyango was appointed assistant bishop of Bondo during the synod of the Diocese of Bondo, Siaya County in January 2021. She is the first woman to hold the position of bishop in the ACK, after approval of a proposal to allow women to become bishops in 2013, the first female Anglican bishop in east and central Africa, and the fourth on the African continent. She will work with David Kodiah in training clergy, as well as initiatives focused on ending gender based violence and encouraging child empowerment. Speaking after her appointment, she said, "I am thankful to be asked to participate in a well-structured pastoral ministry focusing on marriage, family and gender issues, including empowerment of widows. I particularly expect us to offer hope for those shackled by gender-based violence."

Her appointment was challenged by six lay members of the synod, who argued Bishop Kodia had cajoled the synod into affirming her appointment and that the diocese was unable to afford an assistant bishop. A 2014 informal agreement of GAFCON put a moratorium on the ordination of women in certain provinces, however the Kenyan General Synod affirmed its support for women bishops in September 2019.

== Personal life ==
Onyango is married to Apollo Onyango, a retired school teacher, and they have two adult children.

== Publications ==
=== Books ===
- Onyango, Emily (2003). For God and Humanity: 100 Years of St. Paul's United Theological College. Zapf Chancery. ISBN 9789966974228.
- Onyango, Emily Awino (2018). Gender and Development: A History of Women's Education in Kenya. Langham Publishing. ISBN 9781783684908.

=== Articles ===
- Onyango, Emily A. (2002). "Single Parenthood: A challenge to the Christian understanding of family in Kenya". Transformation: An International Journal of Holistic Mission Studies. 19 (1): 80–82. doi:10.1177/026537880201900119. S2CID 149431286.
- Onyango, Emily (2016). "The negative consequences of dowry payment on women and society" (PDF). Priscilla Papers. 30 (1): 1–4.
- Onyango, Emily (2016). "Women Leaders Rising Up: A Case Study of the Anglican Church of Kenya 1844–1945". Mission Theology in the Anglican Communion.
- Onyango, Emily (2017). "The Challenge of Gender-Based Violence in Kenya and the Response of the Church". Mission Theology in the Anglican Communion.
- Onyango, Emily. "The Impact of Education on Integral Development: A case study of early Missionary Education in Colonial". African Multidisciplinary Journal of Research. 1 (1): 88–106.
- Onyango, Emily (2019). "Gender Equality in the East African Revival Movement". African Multidisciplinary Journal of Research. 4 (1): 21–42.

== See also ==
- Ordination of women in the Anglican Communion
