= Ernest Ng'eno =

Kenyan Anglican Bishop 2016–present

Ernest Ng'eno is a Kenyan Anglican bishop; since 2016 he has been the Bishop of Kericho.

Ngeno was born on 12 February 1979 at Ainamoi. He was educated at Telanet Primary School, Kenegut Secondary School and St. Paul's University, Limuru. He was ordained in 2003 and began his career in Nairregie- Enkare Parish. After that he served in Sotik Parish and Belgut Parish. Ng'eno became the Diocesan Administrative Secretary of Kericho in 2015.
