= Charles Gaikia =

Kenyan Bishop from 1998 to 2013

Charles Gaikia is an Anglican bishop in Kenya: he was the Bishop of Nyahururu from 1998 to 2013.
