= Johannes Angela =

Kenyan bishop

Johannes Otieno Angela was the inaugural Anglican Bishop of Bondo, serving from 2000 to 2017.
