= James Mundia =

Bishop from Kenya

James Israel Mundia was an Anglican Bishop in Kenya during the last third of the twentieth century.

Agola was educated at St. Paul's University, Limuru. He was ordained deacon in 1959 and priest in 1960. He was Youth adviser for the Diocese of Maseno from 1965 until 1970; and Bishop of Maseno North from 1970 to 1973.
