= Joseph Muchai =

Kenyan bishop

Joseph Kamwati Muchai is an Anglican bishop in Kenya: he has been Bishop of Nakuru since 2012.
