= Paul Korir (bishop) =

Kenyan Anglican bishop

Paul Korir is a Kenyan Anglican bishop: since 2016 he has been the inaugural Bishop of Kapsabet.
