= Joshua Owiti =

Anglican cleric

Joshua Owiti (born 1959) has been the Anglican Bishop of Maseno East since 2016.
