= Stephen Kabora =

Stephen Kabora is an Anglican bishop in Kenya; since 2014 he has been the Bishop of Nyahururu.
