= Samson Tuliapus =

Kenyan Anglican bishop

Samson Tuliapus is an Anglican bishop in Kenya: he has been the Suffragan Bishop of Kapenguria in the Anglican Diocese of Kitale since 2017.
