= Musa Kamuren =

Kenyan bishop

Musa Kamuren is an Anglican bishop in Kenya: from 2015 he was the Suffragan Bishop of Nakuru; and from 2018 he was Bishop of the newly created Diocese of Baringo .
