= Barbara Andrews (bishop) =

Bishop in the Anglican Church

Barbara Andrews is a retired Anglican Suffragan Bishop in the Anglican Church of Canada: she was responsible for the Anglican Parishes of the Central Interior and reported to the Metropolitan of British Columbia and Yukon. Formerly Director of the Sorrento Retreat and Conference Centre in British Columbia, she was elected on 30 June 2009; and was consecrated at St Paul's Cathedral, Kamloops, on October 18, 2009. She retired from active ministry on April 30, 2020.
