= Anglican dioceses of Maseno =

Dioceses of the Anglican Church of Kenya

The Anglican dioceses of Maseno are the Anglican presence in and around Maseno, the Winam Gulf of Lake Victoria, and the western slopes of Mount Elgon, south-west Kenya; they are part of the Anglican Church of Kenya. The remaining dioceses of the Church area in the areas of Mombasa, of Mount Kenya, and of Nakuru.

== Diocese of Maseno South ==
Diocese of Maseno South

Location
- Ecclesiastical province: Anglican Church of Kenya

Information
- Cathedral: St Stephen's Cathedral, Kisumu

Current leadership
- Bishop: Charles Ongi'njo

Three dioceses created from the Anglican Diocese of Mombasa in 1960 took in the westernmost area (Nyanza Province: Maseno), the west-central and north-west area (Rift Valley Province: Nakuru) and the central and north-east parts (Central Province: Fort Hall), leaving Mombasa diocese with the south-west area. Maseno diocese itself first split in 1970, into Maseno South and Maseno North, and the southern diocese retained St Stephen's Pro-Cathedral, Kisumu, while Olang' translated to the northern diocese. Maseno South diocese itself has since been split a further three times: Maseno West (1985), Southern Nyanza (1993), and Maseno East (2016).

=== Bishops of Maseno ===
- 1961–1970: Festo Olang' (became Bishop of Maseno North)
  - 21 December 1965 – 1970: Evans Agola (became Bishop of Maseno South)

=== Bishops of Maseno South ===
- 1970–1973: Evans Agola
- February 1974 – 1994: Henry Okullu
  - January 1982 – 1985: Daniel Omolo, Assistant Bishop (became first Bishop of Maseno West)
  - January 1990 – 1991: Haggai Nyang', Assistant Bishop (became first Bishop of Southern Nyanza)
- 1994–2018: Mwai Abiero
- 2018 - Charles Onginjo

== Diocese of Maseno North ==
Diocese of Maseno North

Location
- Ecclesiastical province: Anglican Church of Kenya

Current leadership
- Bishop: Simon Oketch

The first time the Maseno diocese was split, in 1970, the northern portion was erected into the Diocese of Maseno North. Olang', the only diocesan of all Maseno, translated to the new northern See. It was divided in order to make Butere and Mumias dioceses in 1993.

=== Bishops of Maseno North ===
- 1970: Festo Olang' (elected Archbishop of Kenya)
- 1970–1993: James Mundia
  - 1984–1987: Isaac Manango, Assistant Bishop (became first Bishop of Nambale)
- 1995–present: Simon Oketch

== Diocese of Maseno West ==
Diocese of Maseno West

Location
- Ecclesiastical province: Anglican Church of Kenya

Information
- Cathedral: St Peter's Cathedral, Siaya

Current leadership
- Bishop: John Mark Haung

In 1985, the Diocese of Maseno West was carved (on 1 January) from the Maseno South diocese. The diocese itself was split in 1999 to create Bondo diocese.

=== Bishops of Maseno West ===
- 1985–1991: Daniel Omolo (previously Assistant Bishop of Maseno South)
- 1991–2019: Joseph Wasonga
- 2019-Present: John Mark Haung

== Diocese of Nambale ==
Diocese of Nambale

Location
- Ecclesiastical province: Anglican Church of Kenya

Information
- Cathedral: St Thomas' Cathedral, Nambale

Current leadership
- Bishop: Robert Magina

Nambale diocese was erected from Maseno North in 1987, and was itself sub-divided to erect Katakwa and Bungoma dioceses in 1991 and 1996.

=== Bishops of Nambale ===
- 1987–?: Isaac Manango (previously Assistant Bishop of Maseno North)
- Josiah Were
- 2014–present: Robert Magina

== Diocese of Katakwa ==
Diocese of Katakwa

Location
- Ecclesiastical province: Anglican Church of Kenya

Information
- Cathedral: St John's Cathedral, Katakwa

Current leadership
- Bishop: John Omuse

Website
- sites.quickbizsites.com/katakwa/home

The Diocese of Katakwa was carved from the Nambale diocese on 1 January 1991; after a concerted campaign led by, among others, Alexander Muge, Bishop of Eldoret.

=== Bishops of Katakwa ===
- 1991–2007: Eliud Okring
- 7 January 2007 – 2016: Zakayo Epusi
- 2016–present: John Omuse

== Diocese of Southern Nyanza ==
Diocese of Southern Nyanza

Location
- Ecclesiastical province: Anglican Church of Kenya

Information
- Cathedral: Christ the Healer Cathedral, Homa Bay

Current leadership
- Bishop: John Omangi

Divided on 1 January 1993 from the Diocese of Maseno South, the Southern Nyanza diocese has her cathedral at Homa Bay.

=== Bishops of Southern Nyanza ===
- 1991–2002: Haggai Nyang' (previously Assistant Bishop of Maseno South)
- 2002–present: James Ochiel
  - 2016–present: John Omangi, Bishop suffragan of Kisii

== Diocese of Butere ==
Diocese of Butere

Location
- Ecclesiastical province: Anglican Church of Kenya

Information
- Cathedral: St Luke's Cathedral, Butere

Current leadership
- Bishop: Tim Wambunya

Website
- buterediocese.com

Butere was split off Maseno North in January 1993. The cathedral is at St Luke's, Butere, while there are development plans for a Canon Awori Memorial Cathedral in Butere.

=== Bishops of Butere ===
- 1993–2003: Horace Etemesi
- 2003–2013: Michael Sande
- 6 October 2013 – September 2020: Tim Wambunya
- 12 September 2021 – Present: Rose Okeno

== Diocese of Mumias ==
Diocese of Mumias

Location
- Ecclesiastical province: Anglican Church of Kenya

Information
- Cathedral: Bishop Hannington Cathedral, Mumias

Current leadership
- Bishop: Joseph Wandera

Website
- ackmumiasdiocese.org

The Diocese of Mumias was erected from Maseno North diocese in January 1993 (the same time as Butere).

=== Bishops of Mumias ===
- 1993–2001: William Shikukule (died in office)
- 30 June 2002 – 2017: Beneah Salala
- 2017–present: Joseph Wandera

== Diocese of Bungoma ==
Diocese of Bungoma

Location
- Ecclesiastical province: Anglican Church of Kenya

Information
- Cathedral: St Mathew's Pro-Cathedral, Webuye

Current leadership
- Bishop: George Mechumo

By the sub-division of the Diocese of Nambale, Bungoma diocese was created on 1 January 1996.

=== Bishops of Bungoma ===
- 13 October 1996 – 2009: Eliud Wabukala (became Primate and Archbishop of All Kenya)
- 1 November 2009 – present: George Mechumo

== Diocese of Bondo ==
Diocese of Bondo

Location
- Ecclesiastical province: Anglican Church of Kenya

Information
- Cathedral: St Michael and All Angels Cathedral, Bondo

Current leadership
- Bishop: David Kodiah

The Diocese of Bondo in Bondo, Kenya was elected on 1 September 1999 from Maseno West diocese.

=== Bishops of Bondo ===
- 20 February 2000 – July 2017: Johannes Angela (retired)
- July 2017 – present: David Kodiah
- January 2021 – present: Emily Onyango, Assistant Bishop

== Diocese of Maseno East ==
Diocese of Maseno East

Location
- Ecclesiastical province: Anglican Church of Kenya

Information
- Cathedral: St Peter's Pro-Cathedral, Ndori

Current leadership
- Bishop: Joshua Owiti

The Maseno East diocese is the youngest in the area, having been created from Maseno South on 1 January 2016.

=== Bishops of Maseno East ===
- June 2016 – present: Joshua Owiti
