= Anglican Diocese of Kitale =

Coordinates: 1°01′N 35°00′E

The Diocese of Kitale is an Anglican See in the Anglican Church of Kenya. As of August 2018, the current bishop is Emmanuel Chemengich.
