= Stephen Mwangi =

Kenyan Anglican bishop

Stephen Njihia Mwangi, MPhil, was an Anglican bishop in Kenya during the last decade of the 20th century and the first two of the 21st: he was Bishop of Nakuru from 1990 until 2011.

He was the celebrant at the enthronement of Benjamin Nzimbi as Archbishop of Kenya in 2002.
