= Stephen Kewasis =

Stephen Kewasis is an Anglican bishop in Kenya. he was Bishop of Eldoret from 1990 to 1997; and Bishop of Kitale from then until 2018.
