= Evans Agola =

20th century Kenyan Anglican bishop

Evans Agola was an Anglican bishop in Kenya during the last third of the twentieth century.

== Biography ==
Agola was educated at St. Paul's University, Limuru. He was ordained deacon in 1943 and priest in 1945. He served the church at Ng'iya, Kitale, Kisumu and Ramba. He was Assistant Bishop of Maseno from 1965 to 1970; and Bishop of Maseno South from 1970 to 1973.
