= Cleti Ogeto =

Cleti Ogeto is the Anglican Missionary Bishop of Lodwar in Kenya.
