= Ladan Kamau =

Ladan Kamau was an Anglican bishop in Kenya during the last quarter of the twentieth century.

Gatambo was educated at St. Paul's University, Limuru and was ordained in 1949. He served in Kathukeni, Fort Hall, Aberdare, and Nyandarua. He was archdeacon of Nakuru from 1969 until he became bishop of Nakuru in 1980.
