= Christopher Ruto =

Kenyan Anglican bishop

Christopher Ruto is an Anglican bishop in Kenya. He has been Bishop of Eldoret since 2011.
