= Sophie Relf-Christopher =

Australian Anglican bishop

The Right Reverend Sophie Relf-Christopher
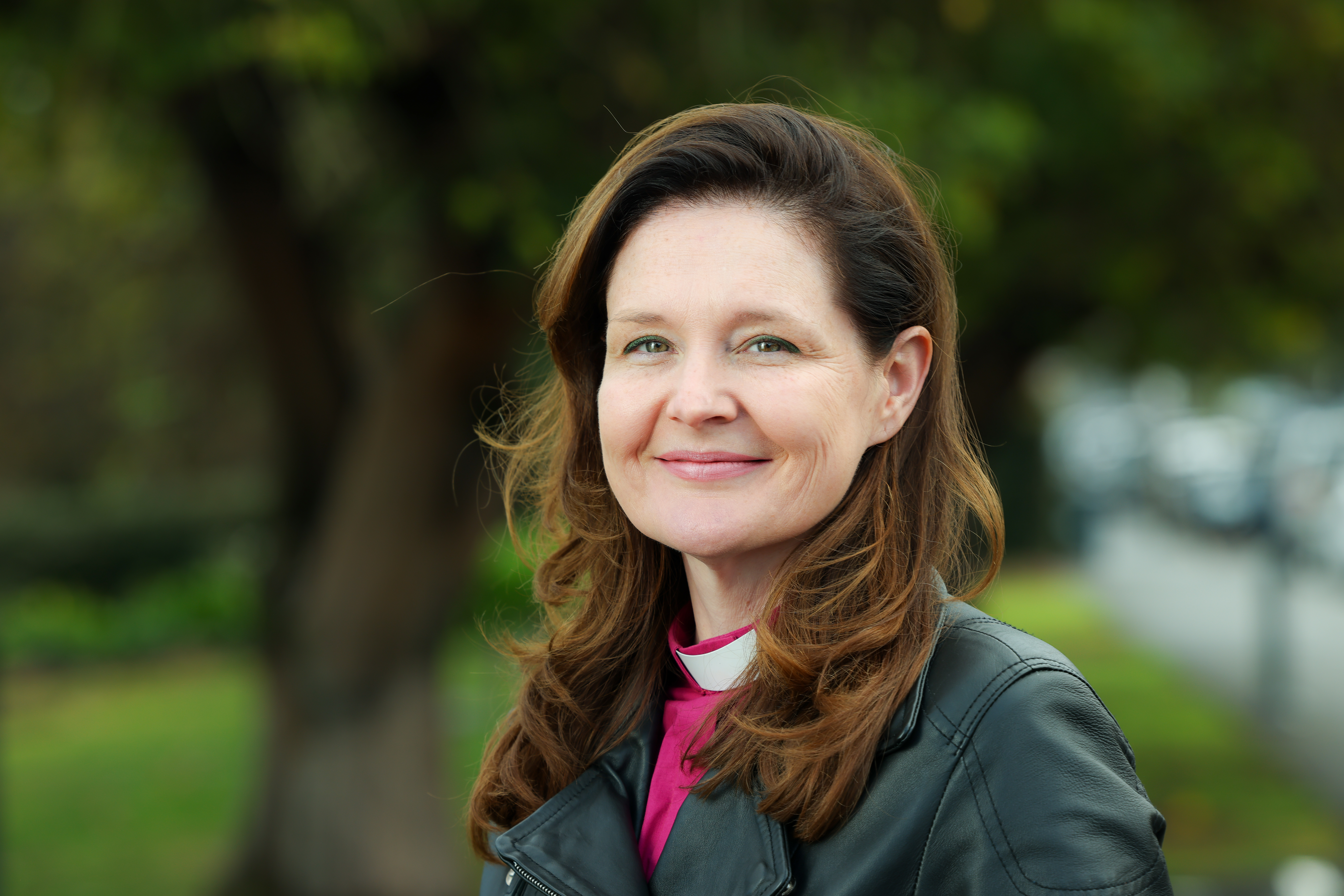
- Bishop Sophie Relf-Christopher
- Church: Anglican Church of Australia
- Diocese: Adelaide
- Installed: 15 August 2024

Orders
- Ordination: 2010 (as deacon); 2011 (as priest)
- Consecration: 15 August 2024 by Geoffrey Smith

Personal details
- Born: London, United Kingdom
- Denomination: Anglican
- Spouse: Paul
- Children: 2

Sophie Relf-Christopher is an Australian bishop in the Anglican Church of Australia. She has been an assistant bishop in the Anglican Diocese of Adelaide since August 2024. She is the second woman Anglican Bishop in Adelaide, after Denise Ferguson, who retired in 2024. Her installation was on 15 August 2024, the feast of Mary, mother of our Lord, at St Peter's Cathedral, Adelaide.

Prior to becoming bishop, she was the parish priest of St Jude's Church in Brighton, and Archdeacon of Sturt. She was previously assistant curate at St Peter's Church in Glenelg, before becoming parish priest of Broadview (St Philip's) and Enfield (St Clement's) from 2012 until 2016.

== Personal life ==
Born in London, Relf-Christopher moved to Adelaide as a child. She is married to Paul and has two sons. Before being ordained as a priest, she taught film and television production at the University of South Australia.
