= Alexander Muge =

Bishop from Kenya

Alexander Kipsang Muge (1948–1990) was an Anglican bishop in Kenya: he was Bishop of Eldoret from 1983 until his death in 1990.

Muge was born in 1948 and educated at St. Philip's, Maseno. He was ordained deacon in 1975 and priest in 1976. He served at St. Stephen, Nairobi and then at All Saints' Cathedral, Nairobi.

Muge became a critic of Daniel arap Moi and advocated for civil rights in Kenya. His death in a car accident is widely regarded as suspicious.

== Early life ==
Alexander Kipsang Muge was born in March of 1948 to Anna Chepkoskei who went by the moniker “the woman of the dusty roads.” (A moniker born from her efforts of fetching firewood for her children) Born into the Kamelilo Clan, Kipsang was known to refuse the common traditions of his clan and would often abstain from ceremonies as a child, much to the astonishment of the clan elders. This refusal remains a mystery in light of his lack of Christian faith at the time.

According to his mother, Kipsang was a child who loved the solitude of the forest and possessed an ever-inquisitive spirit. His father, recognising his ability, enrolled him into the Africa Inland Church Primary School at Tangaratwet where he received exemplary marks in his fourth year common entrance examination in 1962. Later, Kipsang studied at the Anglican Mission School where he passed the Kenya Primary Education Examination.

== Early Christian Faith ==
Kipsang was converted and baptized on October 25, 1970, at St. Michael and All Angels Church in Ruiru by Rev. John Kago. As a soldier at the time, Kipsang proclaimed to have previously lived a life of sin which changed after a personal encounter with Christ. He was encouraged by born again Christians to pursue the path of faith to its ultimate end and from then on, Kipsang became totally devoted to the revival movement.

In 1973, Kipsang resigned from his work as a soldier and began his studies at St. Philip's Maseno Bible School. In 1975, he was ordained as a deacon at St. Stephen’s Church, Jogoo Road, in Nairobi. The following year, he was ordained as a priest and became a curate there. Later, he served as a priest at St. Mark’s Church, Westland, Nairobi, before attending London Bible School in Britain in 1979. Whilst in London he also held the position of secretary for the Pan-African Student Body. He graduated from the London Bible School in June 1982 with a bachelor of arts in divinity, returning to Kenya right after. He rejoined the diocese of Nairobi and on July 1 of that same year, was appointed assistant provost of All Saints Cathedral. Muge served at All Saints for eleven months before being appointed bishop of the newly created diocese of Eldoret on June 5, 1983.

== Episcopacy ==
As a Bishop, Muge maintained his stalwart vision for Kenya. He devoted his life to the advocacy and proclamation of social truths and embodied the notion of the power of the pulpit to transform and reform society. Nicholas Otieno, in his book about Muge mentions that “When Muge set out for a mission, however dangerous it was, no one, not even his family could stop him. He was a man of depth and total commitment to the cause of truth. He had faith beyond the fear of death”.

Bishop Muge had a particular focus on defending the poor and oppressed children of God. Being a part of the military previously, Muge often conceptualized his vocation as a watchman looking over the flock.

Muge held a traditional interpretation of Scripture. On May 17, 1990, during a visit to the USA, he openly condemned homosexuality, appealing to the authority of Scripture in its classic understanding which, he said, must not be compromised. Muge was a firm anti-corruption advocate for the church calling it the nation's conscience which needs to remain clear. Maintaining moral authority was of the utmost importance. Muge preached a holistic gospel aiming to increase the community’s capacity to plan and implement development projects. Muge launched the Christian Community Services (CCS) to oversee all development activities within the diocese.

== Death ==
On August 14, 1990, at the age of 42, Muge lost his life in a collision with a truck near Kipkaren, Uasin Gishu district. He had ignored multiple warnings from Minister for Labor Mr. Habenga Okondo that he "would not leave the area" lending credibility to speculation that his collision was not really an accident, according to the Dictionary of African Christian Biography. and other sources.
