= Henry Okullu =

Bishop from Kenya

John Henry Okullu (1929, Ramba Village, Asembo Central Location, Siaya District, Nyanza Province – 1999) was a Kenyan Anglican bishop and theologian.

Okullu was a bishop in the Anglican Church of Kenya known for his outspoken criticism of the Kenyan government. He married Esther Benta Nyambok in 1951 and they had 6 children. He was ordained an Anglican deacon in 1957, then as a priest in 1958. Okullu studied at Virginia Theological Seminary from 1963 to 1965, earning a Bachelor of Divinity degree. From 1962 to 1971, he was the editor of a Christian Newspaper in Uganda called New Day. He was consecrated as the first black provost of the Nairobi All Saints Cathedral in 1971 and Bishop of Maseno South Diocese where he served until his retirement in 1994.

Okullu was known for his political engagement. His first book was "Church and Politics in East Africa", published in 1974, which was an early call for pluralistic democracy. In this book he wrote, "The best system of government is one that is based on the principle of the constant exchange of ideas between the rulers and the ruled: a system which provides everyone with an opportunity to make his or her political contribution to the best of his ability and knowledge." Okullu became an outspoken critic of President Daniel arap Moi, criticizing the government over the murder of Foreign Minister Robert Ouko and calling for the introduction of pluralistic politics and fair elections. Despite their public disagreements, Okullu met with President Moi a number of times to provide guidance on issues such as how to respond to election violence in 1992.

He published four books, including an autobiography.
