= Thomas Kogo =

Thomas Kogo is an Anglican bishop in Kenya: he was Bishop of Eldoret from 1997 to 2010.
