= Rose Okeno =

Kenyan Anglican bishop

- Bishop
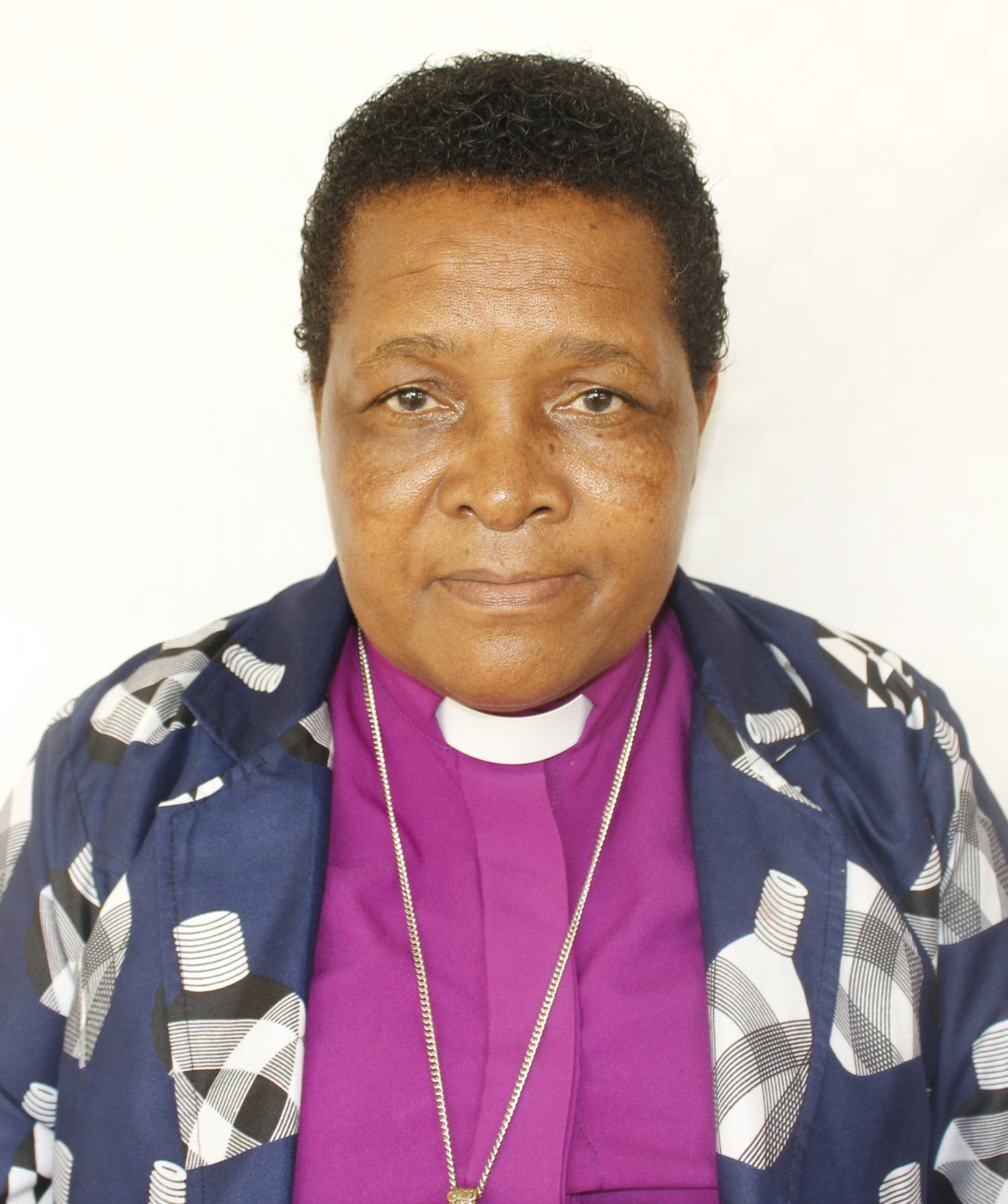
- Church: Anglican Church of Kenya
- Diocese: Butere
- Predecessor: Bishop Tim Wambunya

Orders
- Ordination: September 12, 2021 by Archbishop Jackson Ole Sapit

Personal details
- Spouse: Reverend Elishamo Okeno (deceased)
- Education: Lirembe Girls Secondary (1989) Bachelor in Theology- Kenya Methodist University (KEMU) 2007

Rose Okeno is the first Kenyan woman to be elected as a Diocesan Bishop in the Anglican Church of Kenya. Okeno became the second ordained female bishop in the history of the Anglican Church of Kenya (ACK). She became the fourth elected and consecrated bishop of the Diocese of Butere. In September 2020, Okeno was the acting bishop following the resignation of Bishop Tim Wambunya. Her consecration marked a significant moment in the Anglican church's history, as it went against a movement advocating for a moratorium on the ordination of women bishops. Bishop Okeno is an advocate for women and girls, and for the empowerment of marginalized groups.

== Early life and education ==
Okeno born in the 1960s as Rose Nereya Ayiemba, is the fifth born in a family of nine siblings from Eshibanga village in Butere. She is a mother of four children and wife of Reverend Elishamo Okeno. She attended Lirembe Girls Secondary School in Kakamega County from 1986 to 1989. Okeno has a certificate in Pastoral Studies (1998 to 2000). She has a bachelor's degree in theology from Kenya Methodist University (KeMU) (2003 to 2007).

== Community service and legacy ==
Rose Okeno is the first woman elected Diocesan Bishop in the Anglican Church of Kenya.She became the second ordained female bishop in the Anglican Church of Kenya. She is the 5th African Anglican woman bishop consecrated soon after Emily Onyango's consecration in January 2021. She was consecrated and enthroned as Bishop on September 12,2021 by the sixth Archbishop of the Anglican Church of Kenya,Rev.Jackson Ole Sapit. She is the fourth elected and consecrated bishop of the Diocese of Butere. Her ministry within the church is marked by leadership and advocacy. Before her ordination, she was an administrator, planning and executing administrative and operational plans which contributed to the growth of the community and Butere Diocese. She also served as Women’s Ministry Coordinator for seven years, Diocesan Administrative Secretary for 1 year, Vicar General for 4 years, Archbishop’s Commissary for 2 years, and Archdeacon of Shikunga. As Bishop of the Anglican Church of Kenya (ACK) Diocese of Butere, Okeno is vocal on mental health awareness, social justice, legal empowerment, and integrity within church leadership. She underlines the church’s role in addressing spiritual, cultural and socio-economic challenges in the society through spiritual, psycho-social and socio-economic support. She spearheaded Butere Women's comprehensive funeral service project, and established Young Mothers network groups in the diocese which transform lives through economic empowerment. Okeno emphasizes the importance of clergy involvement in creating safe environments that facilitate equitable access to justice for all individuals. Okeno is a testament that ordination of women is crucial not only for the leadership of the church, but for the well-being of society at large. She advocates for the rights and empowerment of girls and children, women, and the marginalized in society by responding to their needs and calling out those in positions of influence who subvert justice.

== Dispute ==
The Global Anglican Future Conference, known as GAFCON met in Jerusalem, Israel June 17–22, 2018. At this conference GAFCON called for a moratorium on the ordination of women, "until such a time when a consensus is reached". The Religion News Service, describes GAFCON as a "conservative movement in the church." GAFCON was formed in 2008 in response to the acceptance of homosexual clergy and the consecration of Bishop Gene Robinson to the Diocese of New Hampshire by the Episcopal Church in North America in 2003. Robinson was an openly gay priest in the United States.

== Female Anglican Bishops in Africa ==
- Bishop Ellinah Ntombi Wamukoya was ordained as bishop of Swaziland Diocese in Southern Africa in 2012. She died of COVID-19 in January 2021.
- Bishop Margaret Vertue was elected bishop in October 2012 and consecrated in 2013 in the South African Diocese of False Bay.
- Bishop Elizabeth Awut Ngor was consecrated as an assistant bishop in the South Sudan Diocese of Rumbek in 2016.
- Bishop Emily Onyango was consecrated assistant bishop of Bondo in Kenya on January 20, 2021.
- Bishop Rose Okeno was consecrated as a full bishop of Butere Diocese in Kenya on September 12, 2021.
- Bishop Filomena Tete Estevão was elected the first woman bishop from Angola on 8 July 2023 to serve the Anglican Church of Mozambique and Angola.
- Right. Rev Dr Vicentia Refiloe Kgabe is the twelfth and current Bishop Anglican Diocese of Pretoria in South Africa. She was previously the seventh bishop of Diocese of Lesotho, before, 22 September 2025, when the Electoral College of Bishops elected her to become Bishop of Anglican Diocese of Pretoria.
- The Right Rev. Dr Dalcy Dlamini is the second woman bishop in Eswatini, and the fourth woman bishop in the Province of Southern Africa. She succeeds Bishop Ellinah Wamukoya.
