= Griselda Delgado del Carpio =

Episcopal bishop

María Griselda Delgado del Carpio (born 1955) is a Bolivian-born bishop in the Episcopal Church, currently serving as assisting bishop in the Episcopal Diocese of Central Florida, having previously been Bishop of Cuba from 2010 to 2023.

== Education ==
Born in La Paz, Bolivia, Delgado attended the Instituto Americano Methodist high school before studying at the Universidad Mayor de San Andres, graduating in 1981 with a degree in sociology. In 1982 she moved to Cuba to enter the Evangelical Seminary of Theology in Matanzas.

== Career ==
Delgado was ordained as a deacon in 1986 and as a priest in 1991 and served as rector of Santa María Virgen church in Itabo until the Episcopal Church of Cuba installed her as bishop at a service held at Holy Trinity Cathedral in Havana on November 28, 2010. She oversaw the reunification of the Cuban Church with the Episcopal Church of America in 2020, and retired as bishop on March 23, 2023.

Having relocated to Fort Myers, Florida, Delgado was appointed to serve as assisting bishop for Latino ministries in the Episcopal Diocese of Central Florida in 2025.
