= David Kodiah =

Bishop from Kenya

The Rt Revd David Hellingtone Kodia is the second and current Anglican Bishop of Bondo, serving from 2017.

Kodia was educated at Mbita High school in Homa Bay. He attended Bishop Okullu College where he graduated in 1988, Charles University in Prague, and Northwestern Christian University, Florida. He holds a master's degree in theology and Doctor of Philosophy in Christian Theology. He was Principal of St. Philips Theological College Maseno from 1996 to 1998, and then of Bishop Okullu College, Great Lakes University of Kisumu from 2002 to 2016. He was later appointed Acting Vice Chancellor of the Great Lakes University of Kisumu until 2017 when he was elected the second bishop of the diocese of Bondo. Kodia has authored several books including, Mission to the Voiceless, Poverty in Grace, Poverty in Disgrace, Reigns of Hope, and other numerous articles.
