= Jacob Lesuuda =

Kenyan Anglican bishop:

Jacob Lesuuda is a Kenyan Anglican bishop: he is the current Bishop of Maralal.

His daughter Naisula is a senator in Kenya.
