= Haggai Nyang' =

Bishop from Kenya

Haggai Nyang' was an Anglican bishop in Kenya during the last decade of the twentieth century and the first decade of the twenty-first.

Nyang' was educated at the Church Training Centre, Kapsabet. He was ordained deacon in 1967 and priest in 1968. He was assistant bishop of Maseno South from 1990 to 1991 and Bishop of Southern Nyanza from 1991 to 2002.
