= Emmanuel Chemengich =

Emmanuel Chemengich (/tʃɛˈmɛŋɡɪtʃ/ tchem-ENG-itch) is an Anglican bishop in Kenya: since 2018 he has been the Bishop of Kitale.
