= Indigenous Spiritual Ministry of Mishamikoweesh =

Diocese of the Anglican Church in Canada

Diocese of Mishamikoweesh

Location
- Ecclesiastical province: Northern Lights

Statistics
- Parishes: 28 (2022)
- Members: 14,000 (2022)

Information
- Rite: Anglican

Current leadership
- Bishop: Lydia Mamakwa
- Suffragans: Larry Beardy, Morris Fiddler

Map
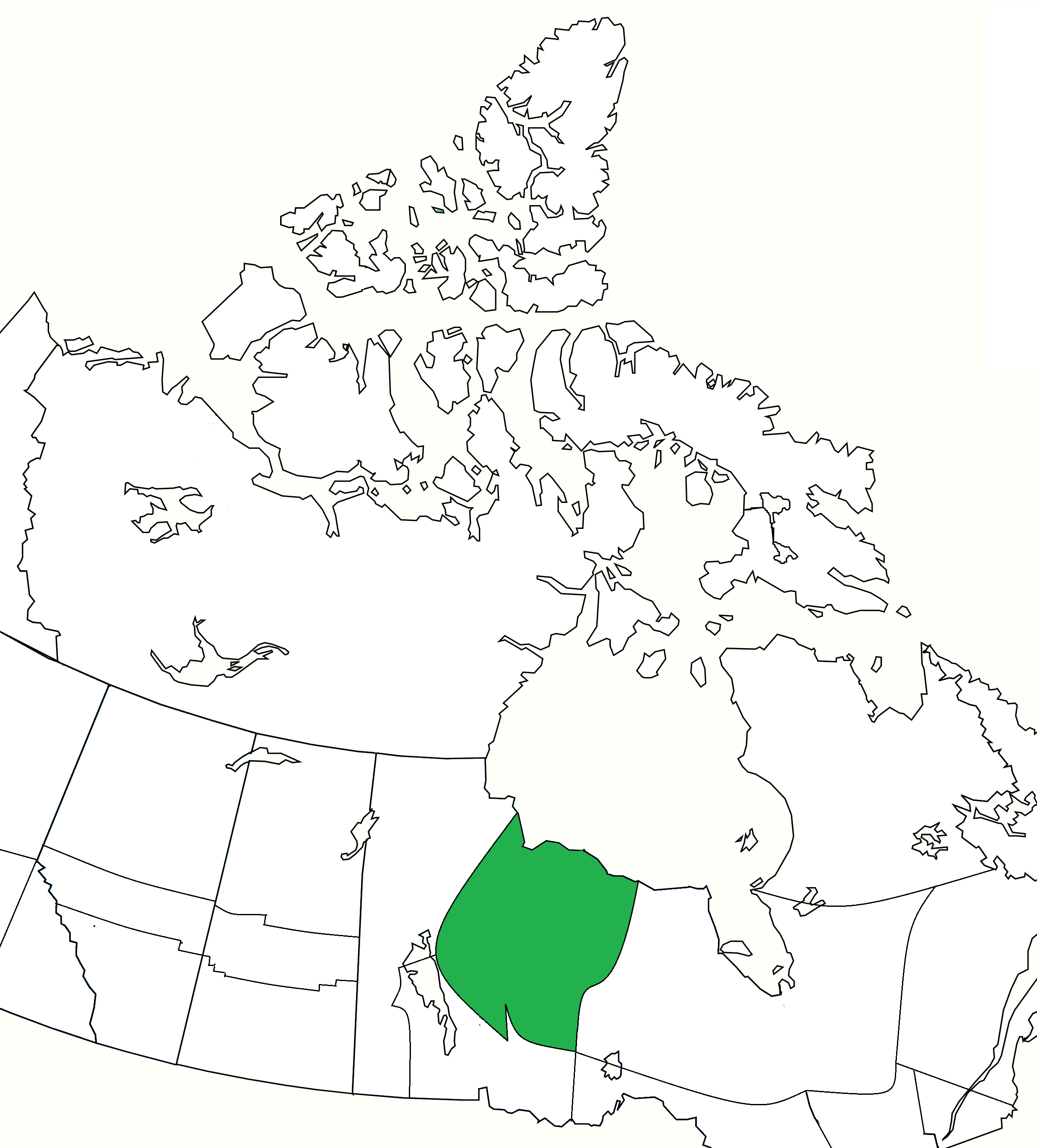
- Location of Mishamikoweesh within the Province of the Northern Lights

Website
- mishamikoweesh.ca

The Indigenous Spiritual Ministry of Mishamikoweesh is a diocese of the Anglican Church of Canada. It was created on 1 June 2014 from the northern portion of the Diocese of Keewatin, and includes more than 25 First Nations communities in north-western Ontario and northern Manitoba.

Lydia Mamakwa, who had previously served as suffragan bishop in the Diocese of Keewatin with responsibility for Northern Ontario, was installed as the first bishop of Mishamikoweesh on 4 June 2014 in Kingfisher Lake, Ontario.
