= Territory of the People =

Diocese of the Anglican Church in Canada

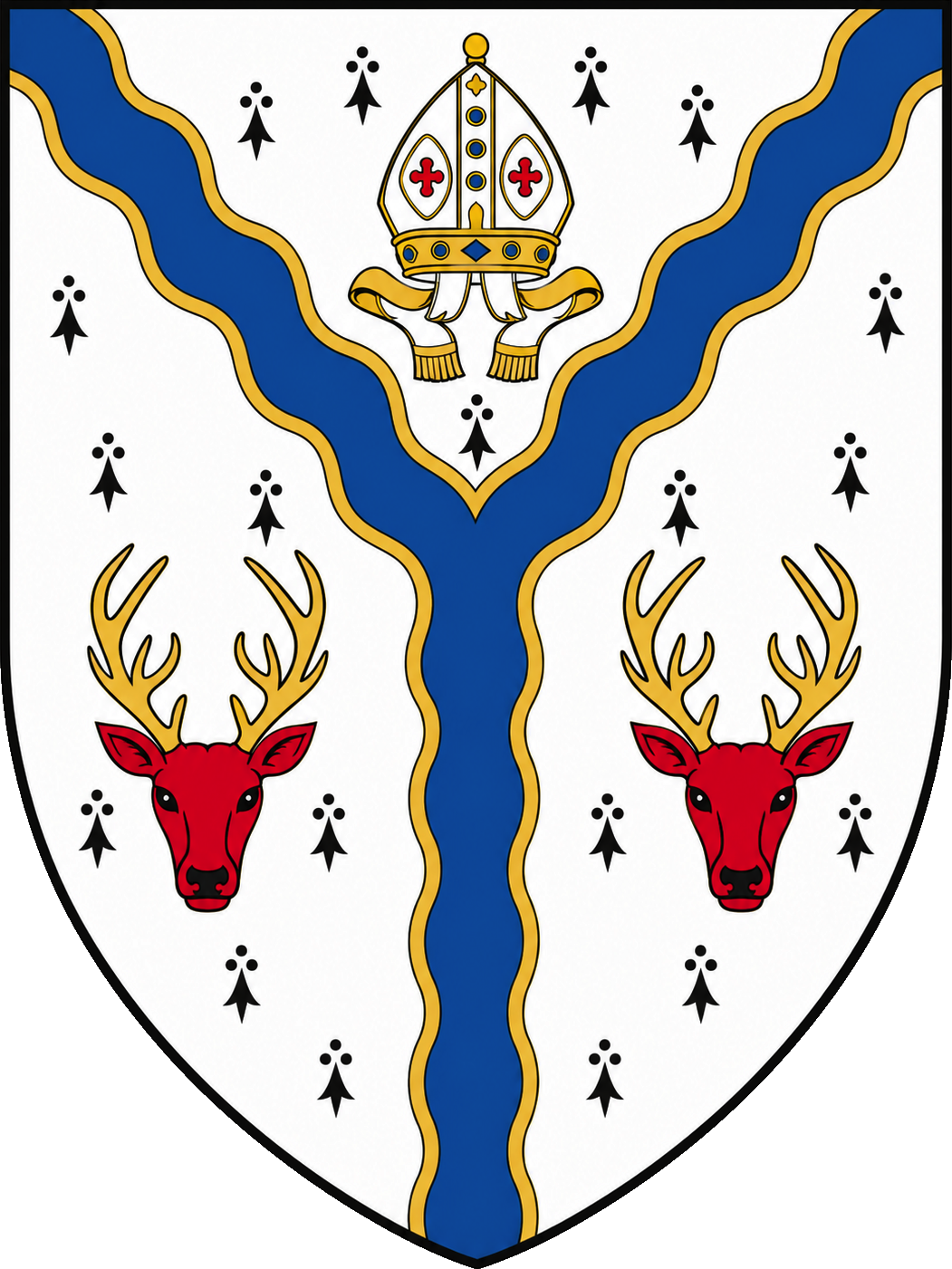

Location
- Ecclesiastical province: British Columbia and the Yukon

Statistics
- Parishes: 19 (2022)
- Members: 1,005 (2022)

Information
- Rite: Anglican
- Cathedral: St. Paul's Cathedral

Current leadership
- Bishop: Clara Plamondon

Map
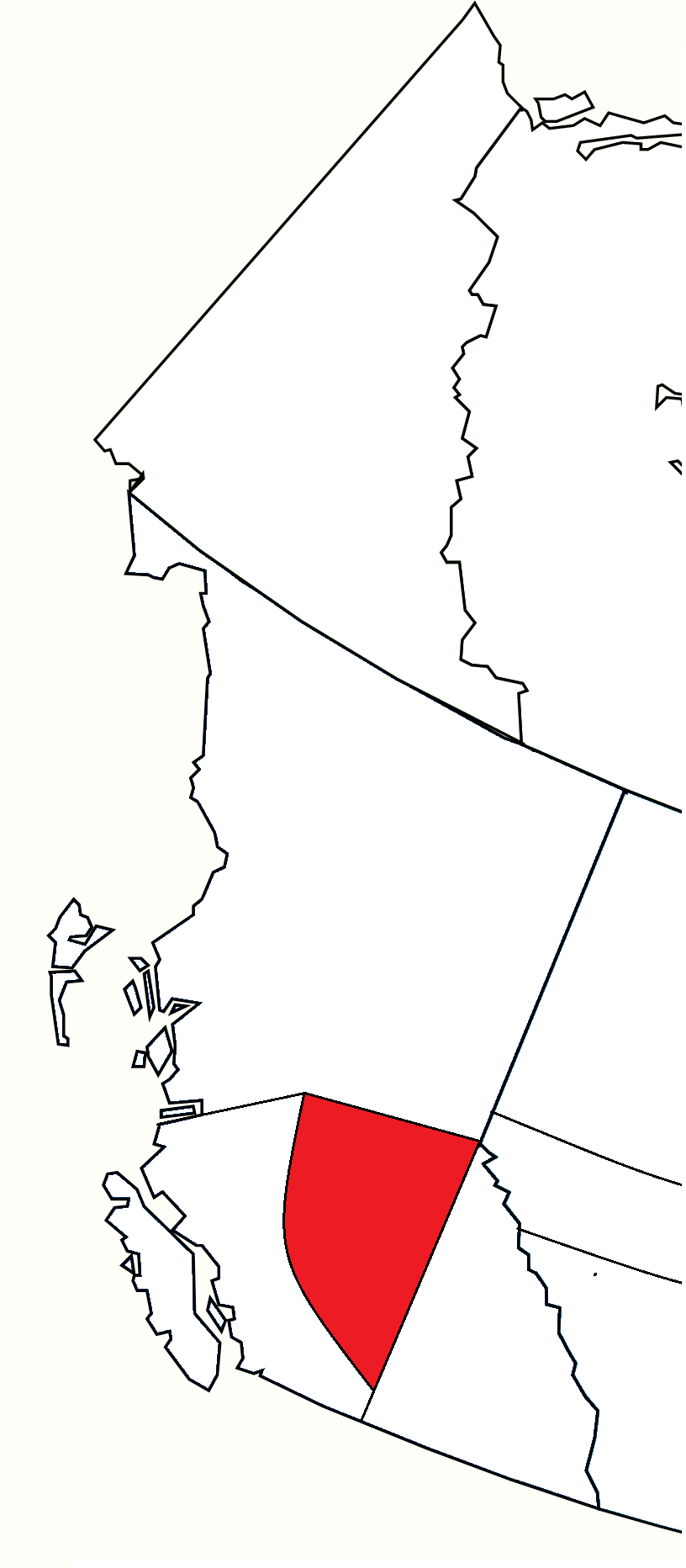
- Location of the diocese within the Ecclesiastical Province of British Columbia and Yukon.

Website
- territoryofthepeople.ca

The Territory of the People (previously called the Anglican Parishes of the Central Interior until 2016) is a "recognized territory [with] the status of a diocese" formed in 2002 out of the former Anglican Diocese of Cariboo, part of the Ecclesiastical Province of British Columbia and the Yukon of the Anglican Church of Canada.

The Diocese of Cariboo was formed in 1914 and ceased operations on December 31, 2001 after being forced into bankruptcy when the financial strain of legal costs associated with damage suits brought by former students of the Anglican-run St George’s Indian Residential School in Lytton, B.C., exhausted the diocese financially.

The parishes that make up the Territory are overseen by a resident bishop (with the status of a diocesan bishop). From 2004 until 2020, the Territory was overseen by a "Suffragan Bishop to the Metropolitan": Gordon Light until 2008 and Barbara Andrews thereafter. Lincoln Mckoen was elected the first substantive bishop at an Electoral Assembly on 25 January 2020 and consecrated a bishop at St Paul's Cathedral Kamloops on 19 September 2020. On June 1, 2021, Mckoen was suspended ("inhibited") under investigation for accusations of inappropriate — but not criminal — conduct; he then resigned the See effective June 10. In January 2022, Jane Alexander, retired Bishop of Edmonton was appointed Interim Bishop pending the election of a new substantive bishop.

On November 14, 2015, the Council of the Anglican Church of Canada's General Synod gave final approval to recognition of the Anglican Parishes of the Central Interior (APCI) as a "recognized territory [with] the status of a diocese" (but not called one) and the former territory of the former Cariboo diocese. In 2016, APCI decided to adopt a new name: the Territory of the People. This took full effect during the same year.

== Bishops ==
1. Lincoln Mckoen (2020–2021)
2. Clara Plamondon (2024–present)
