= Lydia Mamakwa =

The Right Reverend Lydia Mamakwa
- Bishop of Mishamikoweesh
- Church: Anglican Church of Canada
- Diocese: Mishamikoweesh

Personal details
- Born: Kingfisher Lake

Lydia Mamakwa is the first bishop of the Indigenous Spiritual Ministry of Mishamikoweesh, a diocese of the Anglican Church of Canada established on 1 June 2014.

Mamakwa is from the Kingfisher First Nation, an Oji-Cree community in Northern Ontario. Prior to her installation as Bishop of Mishamikoweesh, she served in the Diocese of Keewatin as archdeacon and as area bishop for Northern Ontario. She is also a member of the Anglican Council of Indigenous Peoples, where she has served on the Anglican Church of Canada's eco-justice committee. She also worked with the Kingfisher Lake First Nation band council and as a mental health counselor.

== Honors ==
In 2015, Mamakwa received an honorary Doctor of Divinity degree from Wycliffe College at the University of Toronto.
