= Nerva Cot Aguilera =

Cuban Anglican bishop

The Right Reverend Nerva Cot Aguilera
- Suffragan Bishop
- Church: Episcopal Church of Cuba
- In office: 2007 to 2008

Orders
- Ordination: 1987
- Consecration: June 10, 2007

Personal details
- Born: 1938 or 1939
- Died: July 10, 2010 (aged 71)
- Denomination: Anglican
- Spouse: Juan Ramon de la Paz Cerezo
- Children: Three

Nerva Cot Aguilera (1938/1939 – July 10, 2010) was a Cuban Anglican bishop. From 2007 to 2010, she was a suffragan bishop of the Episcopal Church of Cuba. Upon her consecration, she became the first female Anglican bishop in a developing country and in the whole of Latin America, and the first female bishop in the Caribbean.

== Ordained ministry ==
Cot was ordained in the Episcopal Church of Cuba as a priest in 1987. This made her one of the first three women ordained to the priesthood in Cuba.

In February 2007, it was announced that Cot was to become a bishop, as one of the newly created suffragan bishops of the Episcopal Church of Cuba; the other was Ulises Mario Aguero Prendes. On June 10, 2007, she was consecrated a bishop during a service at the Cathedral of the Holy Trinity, Havana. This made her the first woman to become an Anglican bishop in the whole of Latin America and in a developing country. She was also the first female bishop in the Caribbean. As one of two suffragan bishop, she responsible for the churches in western Cuba. She retired from full-time ministry in 2008.

On July 10, 2010, Cot died at the age of 71; she had been suffering from severe anemia. Her funeral was held the following day (on July 11) in the Cathedral of the Holy Trinity, Havana.

== Personal life ==
Cot was married to Juan Ramon de la Paz Cerezo. He is an Episcopalian priest and is the Dean of the Cathedral of the Holy Trinity, Havana. Together, they had three children. One daughter and their son are Episcopalian priests, the other daughter is a church administrator.
