= Episcopal Church of Cuba =

The Anglican church in Cuba

Diocese of Cuba Diœcesis Cubensis Diócesis de Cuba
- Coat of arms

Location
- Country: Cuba
- Territory: Cuba
- Ecclesiastical province: Province 2 of the Episcopal Church
- Headquarters: Havana

Statistics
- Area: 109,884 km^{2} (42,426 sq mi)
- Population: Total: (as of 2021); 11,193,470
- Congregations: 44 (2024)
- Members: 1,931 (2023)

Information
- First holder: Albion W. Knight
- Denomination: The Episcopal Church
- Established: 1901
- Cathedral: Cathedral of the Holy Trinity
- Language: Spanish
- Calendar: Gregorian calendar

Current leadership
- Parent church: The Episcopal Church of the United States
- Governance: Episcopal polity
- Bishop: The Right Rev. Angel Roberto Rivera

Website
- http://www.episcopalcuba.org

The Episcopal Church of Cuba (Spanish: La Iglesia Episcopal en Cuba) is a diocese of the Episcopal Church in the United States (ECUSA or TEC). The diocese consists of the entire country of Cuba. From 1966 to 2020, it was an extra-provincial diocese under the archbishop of Canterbury. In 2024, the diocese reported average Sunday attendance (ASA) of 1,106 persons, an increase from 621 in 2021. It had 1,931 members in 2023; no membership statistics were reported in 2024 denominational parochial reports.

== History ==
The Episcopal Church of Cuba traces its origins to an Anglican presence that began on the island in 1871. As far back as 1875, the Episcopal Church has had a history with the Cuban people, beginning with pastoral care provided to a Cuban exile community in Key West, to missionaries to Cuba in the 1880s, to the opening of three churches and one school in Havana in 1888. In 1901, the House of Bishops of ECUSA established the Missionary District of Cuba under the jurisdiction of the Presiding Bishop.

In 1966 ECUSA's House of Bishops withdrew ECUSA's association with the Cuban diocese in the wake of the 1959 Cuban Revolution, which had strained communication and travel between the churches. After 1966, as an extra-provincial diocese, the Cuban church was under the oversight of a Metropolitan Council of the Primates of the Anglican Church of Canada, and the Church in the Province of the West Indies, as delegated by Archbishop of Canterbury. The diocese remained a member of the Anglican Communion throughout the period.

During the 79th General Convention held in Austin, Texas, in 2018, the House of Bishops of the Episcopal Church voted unanimously to readmit the Cuban church as a diocese, with the House Deputies concurring.

== Bishops of Cuba ==
Bishop of Cuba	Name	Dates
1st	Albion W. Knight	1905–1913
2nd	Hiram Richard Hulse	1915–1938
3rd	Alexander Hugh Blankingship	1939–1961
4th	Romualdo González Agüeros	1961–1966 (first Cuban Citizen bishop, Spain)
5th	José Agustin Gonzalez	1967–1982 (first Cuban-born bishop)
6th	Emilio Hernández	1982–1992
7th	Jorge Perera Hurtado	1994–2003
	Julio Cesar Holguin Khoury	2004 (Bishop of the Dominican Republic; Acting Bishop)
	Miguel Tamayo Zaldívar	2005–2010 (Bishop of Uruguay, Interim Bishop)
8th	Griselda Delgado del Carpio	2010–2023
	Rafael Morales	2023-2025 (Bishop of Puerto Rico, Provisional Bishop)
9th	Angel Rivera	Elected Feb 28, 2025. (first elected since reintegration, Puerto Rican) Consecrated September 18,2025.

== Recent history and future structure ==
Internal divisions over a range of issues including the possibility of rejoining the Episcopal Church in the United States (ECUSA) and the election of a successor to Bishop Perera, led to a long period of instability within the Iglesia Episcopal de Cuba, which found itself unable to elect a bishop for many years. Bishop Miguel Tamayo Zaldívar, a native Cuban who moved to Uruguay to serve as a missionary and subsequently became Bishop of Uruguay in the Iglesia Anglicana de Sudamérica (formerly the Iglesia Anglicana del Cono Sur de las Americas), was appointed Interim Bishop in 2005.

Following a number of attempts at resolution of the problem, the Metropolitan Council, in February 2007, appointed Canon Nerva Cot Aguilera and Ulises Mario Aguero Prendes as suffragan bishops of the Iglesia Episcopal de Cuba to carry out pastoral oversight under the direction of Bishop Tamayo. They were consecrated on June 10, 2007. Cot Aguilera was the first woman to be appointed an Anglican bishop in Latin America. She expressed openness to ordaining openly gay and lesbian clergy. After a short retirement, Cot Aguilera died suddenly on July 10, 2010 after a brief battle with severe anemia. She was 71.

Bishop Tamayo worked industriously to heal divisions within the diocese, but repeated attempts to elect his successor ultimately failed. Following Bishop Tamayo's announcement in 2009 of his wish to resign (to focus on his ministry in Uruguay, ahead of his anticipated retirement in 2012-2013), and a further inconclusive election, the responsibility for an appointment fell again to the Metropolitan Council, which in January 2010 appointed Griselda Delgado del Carpio as bishop coadjutor (assistant bishop with the right of succession). She was ordained to the episcopate on February 7, 2010 and following Bishop Tamayo's resignation was installed as diocesan on November 28, 2010.

At a meeting of the Diocesan Synod in March 2015, following the decision by the ECUSA and Iglesia Episcopal de Cuba to re-establish diplomatic relations, it was resolved to take steps to formally reincorporate the Cuban church within the Episcopal Church in the United States. A commission was formed to consider what processes would be needed to achieve a reunification, and the General Convention was expected to consider the matter in 2018.

In July 2018, at the 79th Episcopal General Convention, both the House of Bishops and the House of Deputies voted unanimously to re-admit the Episcopal Church of Cuba to ECUSA as a diocese of province II (also called the Atlantic Province), which includes dioceses from New York and New Jersey in the United States, Haiti, and the Virgin Islands.

The Rt. Rev. Griselda Delgado del Carpio, who had led the Episcopal Diocese of Cuba since 2010, retired on March 23, 2023. She was the first woman to serve as a diocesan bishop in Cuba and in Latin America. Rafael Morales, the Bishop of Puerto Rico currently provides provisional episcopal oversight over the Episcopal Church of Cuba until a new elected bishop is enthroned.

The Diocese of Cuba on Feb. 28, 2025 elected the Rev. Angel Rivera, a priest from Puerto Rico, as its next bishop, marking a significant step toward self-determination as a diocese of The Episcopal Church. Rivera's election on the first ballot was the first time the diocese has elected its own leader since Cuba's return to The Episcopal Church was finalized in 2020, and he is poised to become the first Cuban bishop in more than four decades to be chosen by election rather than appointment. Rivera was consecrated bishop on September 18, 2025 with US, Latin America and Spanish bishops among the consecrators.
