= Clara Plamondon =

Canadian Anglican bishop

The Right Reverend Clara Plamondon
- Bishop of the Territory of the People
- Church: Anglican Church of Canada
- Diocese: Territory of the People
- In office: 2024–present
- Predecessor: Lincoln Mckoen
- Other posts: Archdeacon for Cowichan Mid-Vancouver Island, Diocese of British Columbia

Orders
- Ordination: 2013
- Consecration: January 25, 2024 by Lynne McNaughton

Clara Elizabeth Plamondon is a Canadian Anglican bishop. Since 2024, she has been the second bishop of the Territory of the People in the Ecclesiastical Province of British Columbia and Yukon.

== Biography ==
Plamondon was born in northern Alberta near a small Francophone community also called Plamondon. She grew up in rural communities in Alberta, British Columbia and Saskatchewan.

Plamondon began her career in municipal government and later discerned a call to ordained ministry. She received a bachelor's degree in religious education and an M.Div. from Vancouver School of Theology and was ordained as a deacon and priest in the Diocese of British Columbia in 2013.

Prior to her election as bishop, she was incumbent at St. Paul's Church, Nanaimo, and archdeacon for the Cowichan Mid-Vancouver Island area of the Diocese of British Columbia. She was also a member of the diocesan council, the executive committee of the Ecclesiastical Province of British Columbia and Yukon and the Council of General Synod of the Anglican Church of Canada.

In September 2023, Plamondon was elected the second bishop of the Territory of the People. Her election followed a lengthy vacancy after the previous bishop, Lincoln Mckoen, stepped down amid charges of sexual misconduct. She was consecrated and enthroned by Archbishop Lynne McNaughton at St. Paul's Cathedral in Kamloops on January 25, 2024.

Anglican Communion titles
Preceded by Lincoln Mckoen	Bishop of the Territory of the People; 2024–present	Incumbent
