= Denise Ferguson =

New Zealand bishop

The Right Reverend Denise Ferguson
- Assistant bishop, Anglican Diocese of Adelaide
- Church: Anglican Church of Australia
- Diocese: Adelaide
- Installed: 21 July 2019

Orders
- Ordination: 1988 (as lay reader); 1999 (as deacon)
- Consecration: 21 July 2019 by Geoffrey Smith

Personal details
- Denomination: Anglican
- Spouse: Mark
- Children: Daughter
- Education: Otago University

Denise Ferguson is a bishop in the Anglican Church of Australia. She served as an assistant bishop in the Anglican Diocese of Adelaide from July 2019, to July 2024 appointed bishop in the Province of South Australia.

Denise was born in New Zealand, and prior to entering ministry served as a staffer to the New Zealand Defence Force. She commenced training for ministry at the age of 39, and began her ministry career in the Anglican Diocese of Wellington, where she was licensed as a lay reader in 1988 and ordained as a deacon in 1999. Ferguson served as vicar of St Matthew's Palmerston North and then as Archdeacon of Manawatu. She later served as the Bishop's Chaplain for Ministry Discernment in the Diocese of Wellington, and her final position prior to relocating to Australia, Ferguson was the Canon Registrar for the Diocese of Waikato and Taranaki.

In 2014 Ferguson moved to Australia, where she worked in the Diocese of Brisbane as Rector of the Parish of East Redland as well as Archdeacon of Moreton.

Ferguson was consecrated as an assistant bishop in the Diocese of Adelaide on 21 July 2019. Her responsibilities involve parish visiting and liturgical roles, as well as oversight of three areas of ministry across South Australia: multicultural diversity in ministry, healthcare chaplaincies – covering both hospital and social service based care contexts – and ministry formation.

Ferguson is married to Martin, an army officer who put his career on hold to support her ministry training. She also has a daughter and is a grandmother.
