= St. Paul's Cathedral (Kamloops, British Columbia) =

Cathedral in British Columbia, Canada

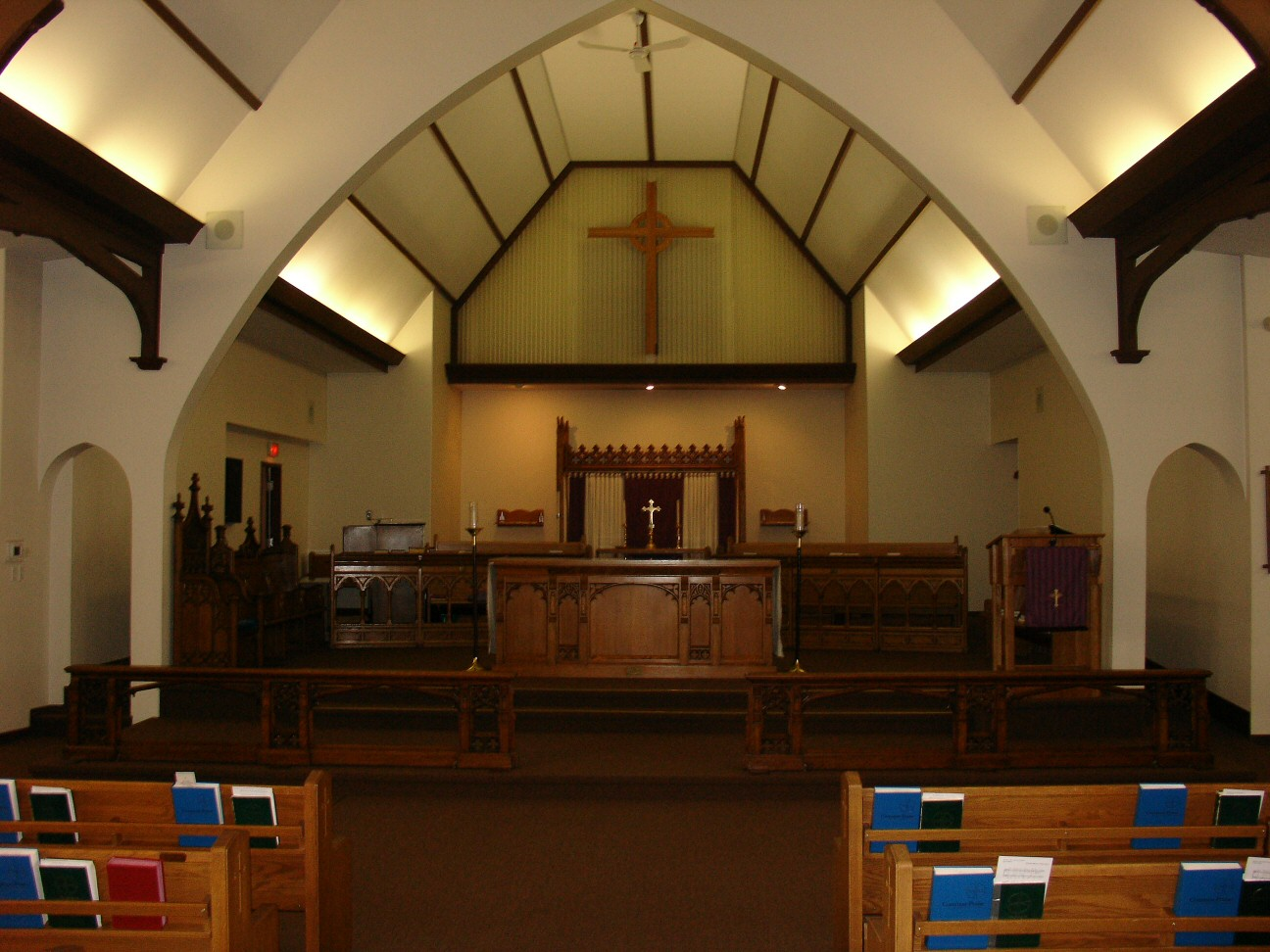
- St. Paul's Cathedral
- 50°40′21″N 120°19′57″W
- Location: 360 Nicola Street, Kamloops, British Columbia, Canada
- Country: Canada
- Denomination: Anglican Church of Canada

History
- Status: Cathedral

Architecture
- Functional status: Active
- Style: Gothic Revival

St Paul's Cathedral, Kamloops, is the Cathedral church for the Territory of the People, Anglican Church of Canada. The Territory of the People (the Territory) was formerly known as the Diocese of Cariboo, which was dissolved because of its inability to meet tort judgments against it in respect of abuse in Indian residential schools. After dissolution of the Diocese of the Cariboo the Territory was temporarily known as The Anglican Parishes of the Central Interior. The area officially became a territory in 2015.

The original church was built in 1888 on Main Street; in 1924, the building was moved to Nicola Street. The building is an extremely modest one both in size and furniture and fittings.

In 2023, the rector and Dean is the Rev Dr Kyle Norman. The bishop having responsibility for the parishes of the Territory is the Rt. Rev. Barbara Andrews; Clara Plamondon was consecrated as Bishop in January 2024.

== Architecture ==
The cathedral's architecture reflects its historical evolution. The original 1888 sanctuary featured a stained-glass window on the east wall, which remains a prominent feature. In the 1950s, significant structural changes were made: the chancel was enlarged, the altar was moved from the east to the west end, and a vestry, chapel, and parish hall were incorporated. A steeple was also erected atop the main entrance. The sanctuary ceiling is supported by exposed beams and rafters, showcasing the craftsmanship of the period.

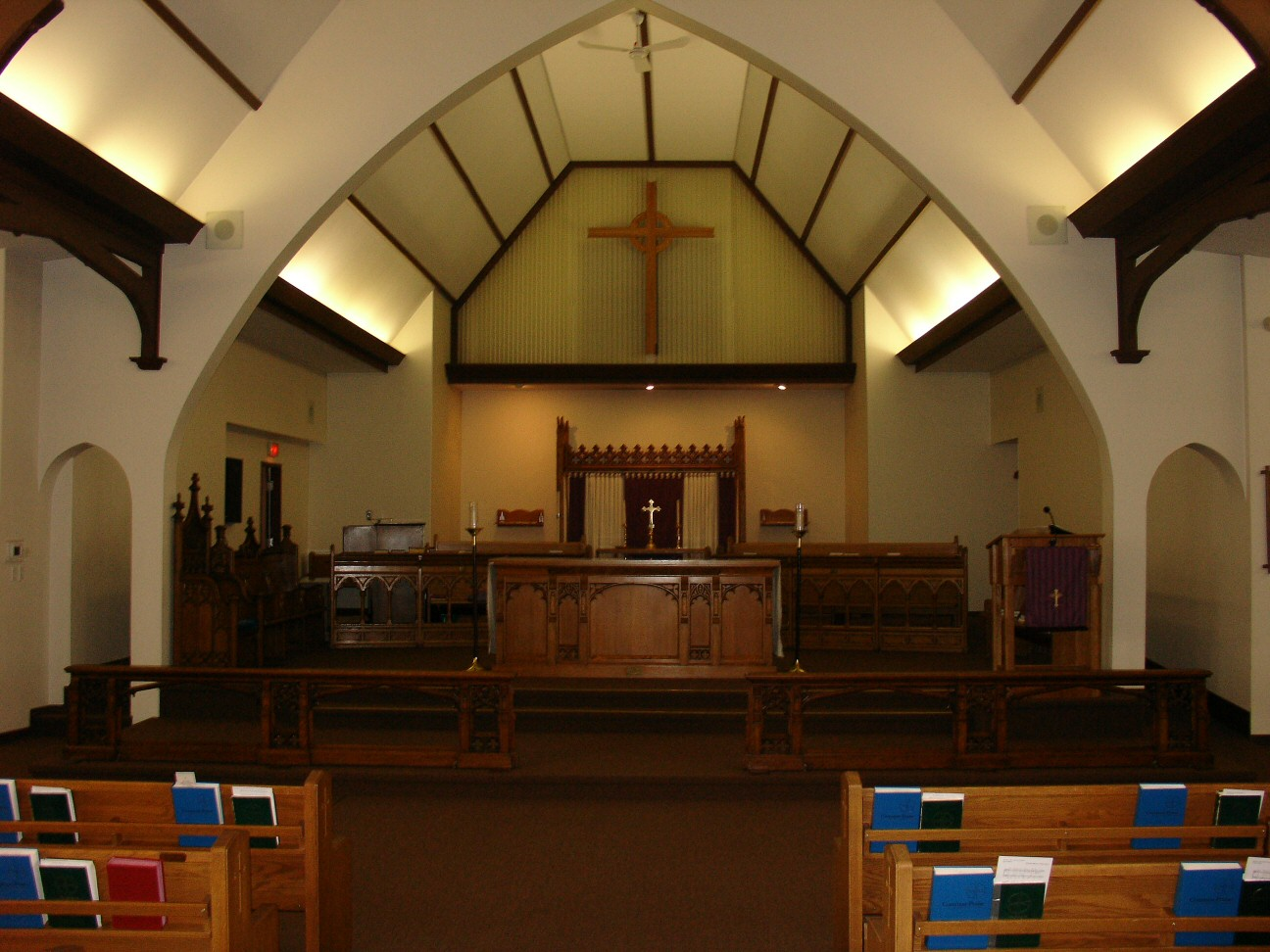

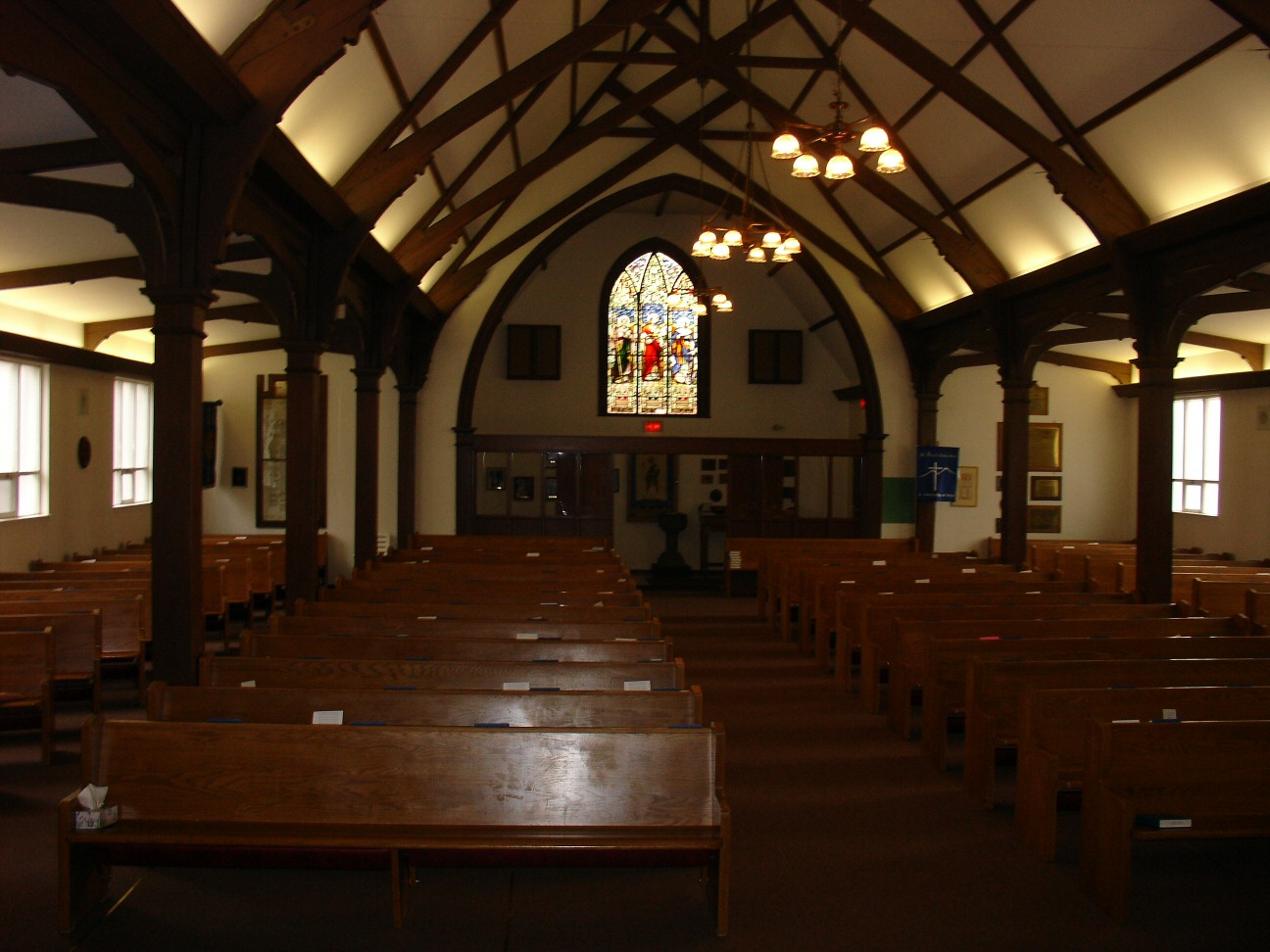

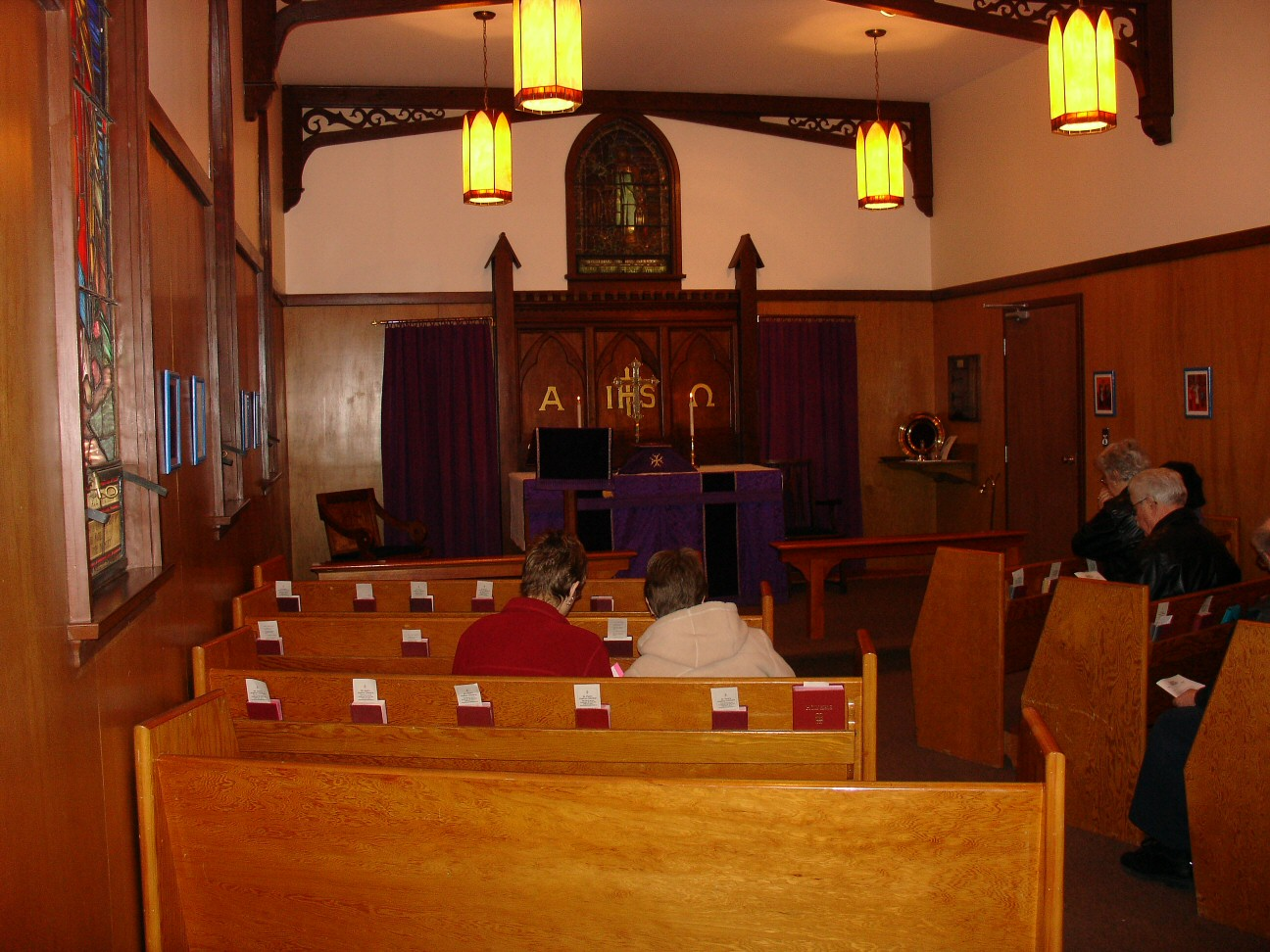

== See also ==
- List of Anglican cathedrals in Canada
- List of cathedrals in Canada
- Anglican Church of Canada
- Territory of the People
- Kamloops
