= St Stephen's Cathedral, Kisumu =

Church in Kisumu, Kenya

Coordinates: 0°6′0″S 34°45′0″E

St Stephen's Cathedral, Kisumu is a religious building that is affiliated with the Anglican Church of Kenya: the old building was in Omolo Agar Road. but has been replaced by a new building.
