= Anglican Diocese of Adelaide =

Diocese of the Anglican Church of Australia

Diocese of Adelaide
- Coat of arms

Location
- Country: Australia
- Territory: Adelaide Plains; Barossa Valley; Kangaroo Island
- Ecclesiastical province: South Australia
- Metropolitan: Archbishop of Adelaide
- Headquarters: 18 King William Road; North Adelaide SA 5006
- Coordinates: 34°54′46″S 138°35′53″E

Information
- Denomination: Anglican
- Established: 25 June 1847
- Cathedral: St Peter's Cathedral, Adelaide
- Language: English

Current leadership
- Parent church: Anglican Church of Australia
- Archbishop: Brad Billings
- Assistant bishops: Tim Harris; (since 2011); Chris McLeod; (since 2015); Sophie Relph-Christopher; (since 2024)
- Dean: Chris McLeod; (since 2021)

Website
- adelaideanglicans.com

The Anglican Diocese of Adelaide is a diocese of the Anglican Church of Australia. It is centred in the city of Adelaide in the state of South Australia and extends along the eastern shore of the Gulf St Vincent from the town of Eudunda in the north to Aldgate in the south. The diocesan cathedral is Saint Peter's Cathedral in Adelaide. The diocese was founded in 1847 with Augustus Short as the first bishop.

== History ==
The diocese was founded by letters patent of 25 June 1847 and now forms part of the Province of South Australia, together with the Diocese of Willochra (1915) and the Diocese of The Murray (1969). Since 1970, the Bishop of Adelaide, as the senior bishop of the province (known as the metropolitan), has borne the title of archbishop.

Jeffrey Driver retired as Archbishop of Adelaide in 2016. Following a process of nomination, an election synod held in December 2016 resolved to invite Geoffrey Smith, then an assistant bishop in the Diocese of Brisbane, to be the 10th Archbishop of Adelaide. He was installed on 28 April 2017. On 7 April 2020, Smith was elected as the Primate of Australia, the first Archbishop of Adelaide to hold the office.

Smith stepped down as primate on 31 October 2025 and was succeeded by Mark Short. He retired as archbishop on 8 November 2025 and was planning to relocate to the Sunshine Coast with his wife, Lynn. In 2026, Smith was succeeded as archbishop by Brad Billings, formerly an assistant bishop in the Diocese of Melbourne.

== Assistant bishops ==
John Vockler was consecrated coadjutor bishop in 1959. Lionel Renfrey was an assistant bishop of the diocese in 1988.

The current assistant bishops in the diocese are:

- Tim Harris – ordained (consecrated) as an assistant bishop and Bishop for Mission and Evangelism in 2011 and became bishop administrator during the 2016–2017 vacancy in the see.
- Chris McLeod – ordained (consecrated) on 11 April 2015 as assistant bishop with special responsibility for ministry alongside Aboriginal people in South Australia and National Aboriginal Bishop. Appointed Dean of St Peter's Cathedral in 2021.
- Sophie Relf-Christopher – consecrated assistant bishop on 15 August 2024.

== List of archdeacons ==
In 1866, there was one archdeaconry: W. J. Woodcock was Archdeacon of Adelaide.
