= Charles Escreet =

Charles Ernest Escreet (20 February 1852 – 3 March 1919) was an Anglican priest: the Archdeacon of Lewisham from 1906 to 1919.

== Life ==
Escreet was educated at Tonbridge School and Wadham College, Oxford. He was ordained in 1875 and began his career with curacies at Barham and Battersea.

He was Vicar of St Andrew's, Stockwell from 1882 to 1892; Rector of Woolwich from 1892 to 1909. Whilst he was there he helped create the British Hospital for Mothers and Babies, an important centre for maternity care and midwifery training, in Wood Street. It opened in May 1905 due to his efforts in assisting Alice Gregory, Leila Parnell and Maud Cashmere.

Escreet was the Vicar of the Church of the Ascension, Blackheath from 1909 to 1917.

In 1913 he co-officiated at the funeral of Emily Davison, the suffragette who had died under the king's horse at the Epsom Derby. His co-officiants were Claude Hinscliff, founder of the Church League for Women's Suffrage, and Charles Baumgarten, vicar of St. George's, Bloomsbury, where the service was held.
