= Maria Tănase =

Romanian singer and actress

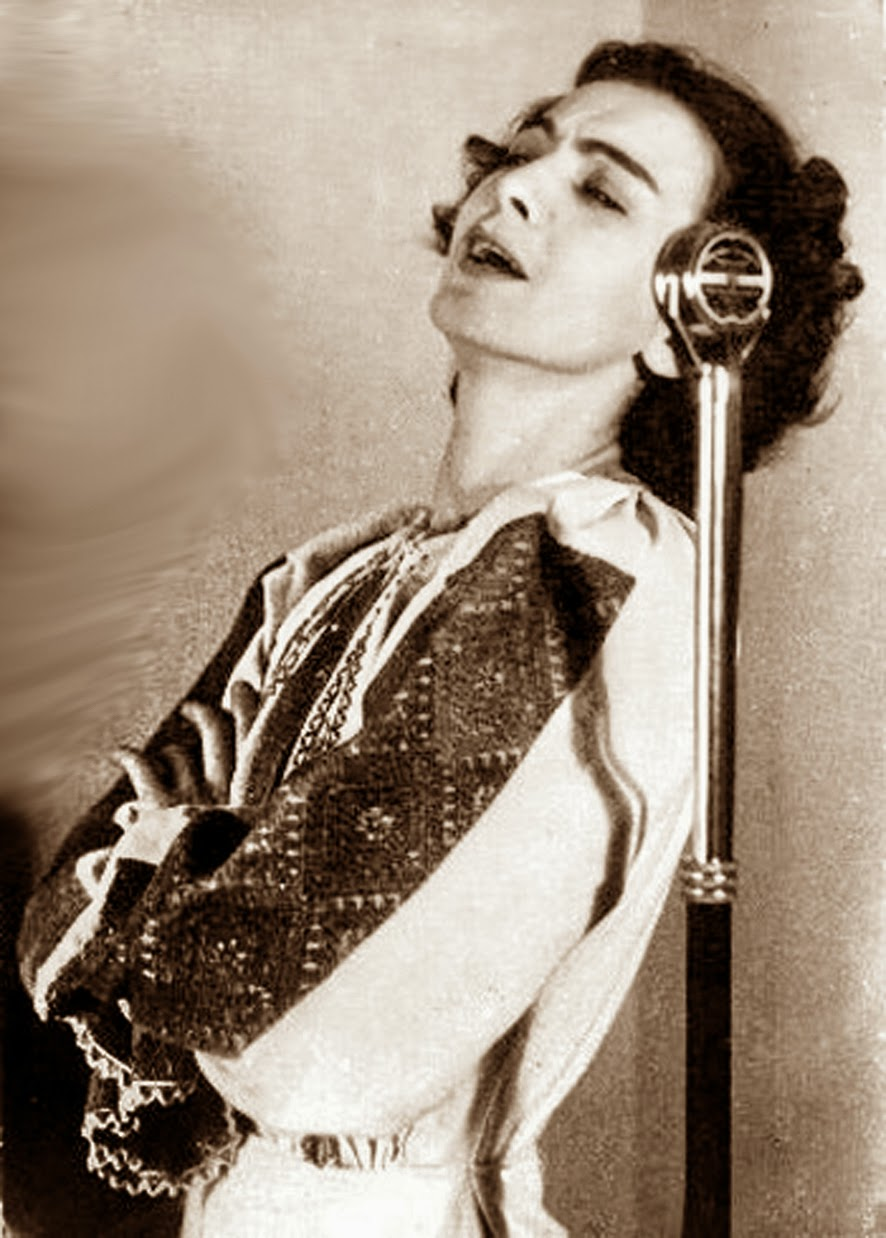
- Born: 25 September 1913; Bucharest, Kingdom of Romania
- Died: 22 June 1963 (aged 49); Bucharest, Romanian People's Republic
- Resting place: Bellu Cemetery, Bucharest
- Occupations: Singer, actress
- Years active: 1934–1963
- Spouse: Clery Sachelarie (m. 1950)

Maria Tănase (Romanian pronunciation: [maˈri.a təˈnase]; 25 September 1913 – 22 June 1963) was a Romanian singer and actress. Her music ranged from traditional Romanian music to romance, tango, chanson, and operetta.

Tănase has a similar importance in Romania as Édith Piaf in France or Amália Rodrigues in Portugal. In her nearly three-decade-long career, she became widely regarded as Romania's national diva, being admired for her originality, voice, physical beauty and charisma. In Romania, she is still regarded as a major cultural icon of the 20th century. In 2006 she was included in the list of the 100 Greatest Romanians of all time by a nationwide poll.

Among her songs are Cine iubește și lasă (1937), Leliță cârciumăreasă (1939), Bun îi vinul ghiurghiuliu (1938), Doina din Maramureș (1956), Ciuleandra (1956), Lume, lume (1958), and Până când nu te iubeam.

== Biography ==
Born in the Bucharest suburb of Cărămidarii de Jos, or Cărămidari, Maria Tănase attended Primary School number 11 from Tăbăcari. Her father, Ion Coanda Tănase, was a master gardener and a florist, also owner of a big nursery on the outskirts of Bucharest, which employed female workers from different various regions of Romania. These women, in turn, would share traditional folk songs and tales which deeply enthralled little Maria, which was to leave a permanent mark on her.

She made her stage debut in Cărămidarii de Jos, at the "Ion Heliade Rădulescu" High School. In 1934, she joined the "Cărăbuș" Theatre of Constantin Tănase with the help and advice of newspaper writer Sandu Eliad, who, at that time was her partner. Her real debut took place on 2 June 1934 with the stage name Mary Atanasiu. In the fall of 1937 she recorded her first folk songs at the Columbia studio in Bucharest. On 20 February 1938 her voice was heard for the first time on the radio. Shortly after, she started to develop a local and international following. She represented Romania at the 1939 New York World's Fair. During the first months of the National Legionary State, Tănase was banned from performing in public and her recordings were destroyed.

During World War II, together with George Enescu, George Vraca, and Constantin Tănase, she was making stage tours singing in front of soldiers injured on the battlefield. In December 1943, she sang at the Christmas festivities at the Royal Cavalry Regiment, where King Michael I of Romania, Ion Antonescu, Mihai Antonescu, and all the members of the government were present as guests. In 1944 Tănase took time to sing in Edmond Audran's operetta "Mascota" (The Mascot).

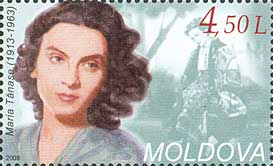
Tănase on a 2003 stamp of Moldova

After World War II, she performed in Review Ensemble Theatre and "Constantin Tănase" Satirical and Musical Theatre. She had parts in the plays "The Living Corpse" by Leo Tolstoy in 1945, and "Horia" by Mihail Davidoglu in 1956. In 1946 she held the main part in the musical comedy "The Hollywood Sphinx", by Ralph Benatzky. She sang in the movie "Romania" in 1947, and in 1958 she performed in both "Ciulinii Bărăganului" (The Thistles of the Bărăgan), and the short-reel film "Amintiri din București" (Memories from Bucharest). During these years Maria was also touring a lot, she had over forty trips only to New York City.

In 1952, Maria Tănase was offered a position at the Music School No. 1 in Bucharest, in the newly created traditional folk song department; 1962 found her guiding "Taraful Gorjului" (The Gorj Folk Music Band) in Târgu Jiu and the artists from "taraf", at her own request.

On 1 May 1963, after a concert in Hunedoara, she was forced to cancel her tour and any other performances due to sickness. On 22 June 1963, she died of cancer. She was buried at the Bellu Cemetery in Bucharest, Romania.

In 1955, Maria Tănase received the State Prize and in 1957 she was honored with the medals "Ordinul Muncii" (The Order for Activity), "Premiul de Stat" (The State Award), and the title "Artistă Emerită" (Honoured Artist of the Republic) for her contributions to the arts.

Within her lifetime, she had also been fondly remembered by many Romanians as their own Edith Piaf, the legendary French singer. Tănase died in June 1963 of lung cancer, three months short of her 50th birthday, whereas Edith Piaf died in October, two months away from her 48th. Throngs of people had filled the streets of Bucharest on the days of her death, to memorialize the lady who helped popularize the folk music of their country.

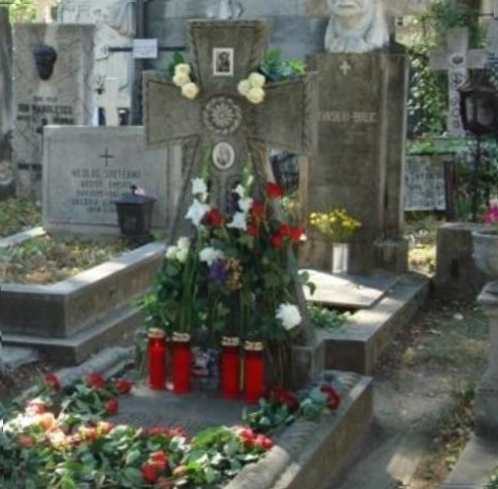
Maria Tănase's grave on what would have been her 100th birthday (at Bellu Cemetery, Bucharest)

Year	Title	Label
1994	Greatest Hits	Intercont Music
1994	Maria Tănase Volume I	Electrecord
1997	Maria Tănase Volume II	Electrecord
2000	Maria Tănase Volume III	Electrecord
2000	Malediction d'Amour	Oriente Musik
2001	Ciuleandra	Oriente Musik
2002	Magic Bird – The Early Years	Oriente Musik
2007	Maria Tănase part I	Jurnalul Național
2007	Maria Tănase part II	Jurnalul Național
2008	Discul de aur	Jurnalul Național
2011	Anii '30–'40	Electrecord
2013	Cântece popular. 1953–1961	Editura Casa Radio

== Legacy ==
In 1939, after meeting Tănase for the first time, Constantin Brâncuși told her: "When I hear you singing, Maria, I would be able to carve for each song of ours a Bird in Space!" He regarded her as a "symbol of all Romanians".

Famous Russian soprano Lydia Lipkowska was also fascinated by her artistry: "No one managed to impress me so deeply with the interpretation of traditional songs and pop music pieces in the way she did. Her voice penetrates me, stirs me, disturbs me so strongly that I always leave as if I tasted a miraculous potion; I feel like I don't have control over my own feelings!"

Nicolae Iorga famously called her "Pasărea măiastră" ("The Majestic Bird").

Mihail Sadoveanu considered her "the first authentic rhapsodist" of the Romanians.

The 2009 Laureate of the Nobel Prize in Literature, Herta Müller, has spoken many times about the influence that Maria Tănase had on her: "When I first heard Maria Tănase she sounded incredible to me, it was for the first time that I really felt what folklore meant. Romanian folk music is connected to existence in a very meaningful way. However, German folklore was not at all inspiring for me."

British musician Nigel Kennedy with Polish Kroke band celebrated her legacy with a recording titled "Tribute to Maria Tănase", which was included on his 2003 album East Meets East. The musical themes of this track are Maria Tănase's song Luncă, luncă (Meadow, Meadow) and Gheorghe Zamfir's Sârba bătrânească.

In 2005 the Balanescu Quartet led by Romanian violinist Alexander Bălănescu released Maria T, an album evoking the spirit of Maria Tănase, one of Bălănescu's earliest influences.

The character of Florica in the first novel of Olivia Manning's Fortunes of War trilogy is supposed to have been based upon Maria Tănase.

In 2013, musical group Pink Martini named Maria Tănase one of their greatest inspirations and covered the song Până când nu te iubeam.

In 2013 Romanian singer Oana Cătălina Chițu who lives in Berlin, published album Divine with songs from the repertoire of Maria Tănase.

On 25 September 2013, Google Romania celebrated Maria Tănase's legacy with a doodle, which marked what would have been her 100th birthday.
