= Florence Canning =

British suffragette

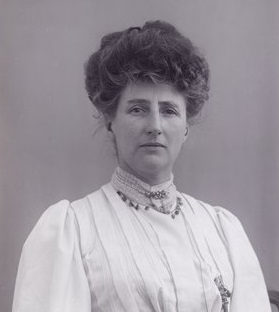
- Born: 19 May 1863; Hereford, England
- Died: 24 December 1914 (aged 51); Brighton, England
- Known for: Leading Church League for Women's Suffrage

Florence Mary Canning (19 May 1863 – 24 December 1914) was a British suffragette and Chair of the Executive Committee of the Church League for Women's Suffrage.

== Early life ==
Canning was born in Hereford on 19 May 1863. She was the eldest daughter of the Reverend Thomas Canning, vicar of Tupsley, and his wife Elizabeth Hampden Phillips. Florence had six siblings, four brothers and two sisters, one of whom, Frances Ethel Canning, became an author and Conservative Church suffragist. She performed with a number of other pupils of Dr Herbert Wareing in a concert at the Public Hall in Worcester in July 1889.

Canning became a professional artist and exhibited her paintings at exhibitions in Hereford and London.

== Activism ==
Canning joined the Women’s Social and Political Union (WSPU) in 1906. She appears on the Suffragette Roll of Honour, having been imprisoned at least twice, firstly in 1908 when she was sent to Holloway Prison after being arrested on a deputation to the Prime Minister.

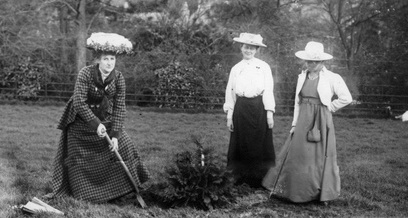
Canning planting a tree with Mary Blathwayt and Annie Kenney in 1909

Canning convalesced on more than on occasion at Eagle House, Batheaston (home of the Blathwayt family) where she planted an Oregon cedar at Annie’s Arboretum on 25 April 1909. Canning was injured in the Black Friday protests on 18 November 1910 but never regained her health, being subsequently diagnosed with breast cancer. When the 1911 census was taken, she participated in the suffragette boycott and evaded being enumerated.

Canning was elected as Chair of the Executive of the Church League for Women's Suffrage (CLWS) in early 1912, before ill-health later forced her to resign. She did attend the General Council meeting of the CLWS which took place in Brighton in July 1913, and appears in a photograph taken by Muriel Darton alongside other delegates including two Indian women. Canning was “most decidedly in favour” of the ordination of women, in correspondence to Ursula Roberts dating from 1913.

Newspaper reports show Canning travelling the country to speak about suffrage, travelling as far as the Isle of Skye and Dublin. Her last public act was as a member of a deputation to the King in May 1914, when she was once again arrested. In addition to the CWLS and the WSPU, Canning was a speaker on behalf of the Conservative and Unionist Women's Franchise Association (CUWFA). She was said to be ‘an indefatigable worker and most effective speaker’. She also worked for the East London Federation of Suffragettes, established by Sylvia Pankhurst.

== Later life ==
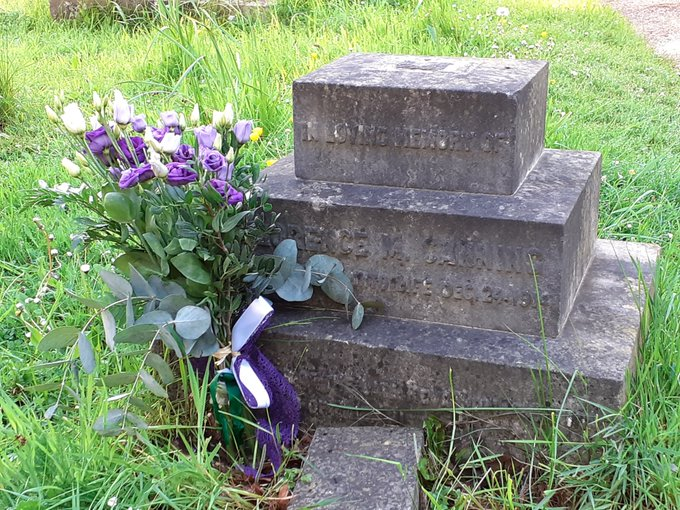
Florence Canning's grave in St Paul's Churchyard in Tupsley, Hereford

Florence did not live to see women win the vote. She died on Christmas Eve 1914 in Brighton, where her death was certified by Dr Louisa Martindale. Florence’s coffin was brought back to Hereford where she was interred with her family at St Paul’s Church, Tupsley. Members of the WSPSU attended her funeral, and Florence was buried with a wreath in the WSPU colours of purple, white and green on her grave.

A fund was set up in her memory by her friends, including CUWFA member, Gertrude Eaton, to raise money for the Women’s Hospital for Children. By 1917 it had collected £265 to equip and furnish an operating theatre in Canning’s memory. Her tree in the aboreatum at Eagle House in Batheaston was bulldozed with dozens of others in the 1960s.

In 2018, she was honoured with a Violet Plaque, an initiative of Hereford Cathedral funded by the National Lottery. In 2022 an appeal was launched by a local suffrage researcher to raise £1,000 to renovate her grave.
