= Recital =

Recital may refer to:

- Recital (law), an account of the details of an act
- Recital (music), a concert (instrumental or vocal performance) led by a soloist or troupe
- Organ recital
- Recital, album by Mary O'Hara
- Recital, album by Julius Patzak
- Recital (Dave Burrell and Tyrone Brown album)
- Recital (Nigel Kennedy album)
- Recital, the Israeli brand-name of the antidepressant Citalopram
