= Muriel Darton =

- Born: 20 March 1882; London, England
- Died: 3 January 1945 (aged 62); Royal Cancer Hospital, London, England
- Occupation(s): suffrage activist and professional photographer
- Organization: Church League for Women's Suffrage

"Church League for Women's Suffrage". 1 September 1913.

Muriel Darton (20 March 1882 – 3 January 1945) was a British suffrage activist and professional photographer who recorded the Church League for Women's Suffrage campaign and worked in London.

== Early life ==
Darton was born in south London on 20 March 1882. She was the youngest of the seven surviving children born to Edward Hack Darton and his wife, Adeline. The Darton family had been involved in publishing since the 1830s, but she did not follow into the business.

It is not clear when she became a photographer, but a picture taken by Darton of the Old Meeting House in Barking appeared in The Friend, which was a Quaker newspaper, on 21 August 1908. She later wrote an article about becoming a professional photographer in the Church League for Women's Suffrage newspaper on 1 September 1915, describing how the training necessary “is not such a lengthy and costly process as is the case with many other professions.”

== Activism ==
Darton photographed Theresa Garnett and Lillian Dove-Willcox for the 6 August 1909 issue of Votes for Women, illustrating the article about their trials. Later that year, a newspaper article in Votes for Women on 29 October marked Darton's enrolment as a member of the WSPU, where she wrote that she was “proud to become a member of a society whose adherents have shown themselves to be so entirely self-sacrificing and noble.”

Within two months she was advertising photography in Votes for Women, offering to cover the costs of materials “in all cases where it might be of service in advancing the propaganda work of the WSPU”. Throughout 1910, 1911 and 1912 she was involved in speaking at WSPU meetings in north London, whilst running her photography business. She does not appear in the 1911 Census, presumably as part of the WSPU resistance campaign.

In February 1912 Darton and her friend Dorothy Jolly set up the North Islington and Hornsey WSPU office at 19 St Thomas’ Road, Finsbury Park. In January 1913 her support for a Cake and Candy Sale in North Islington was acknowledged in The Suffragette, and she continued to speak at meetings in 1913.

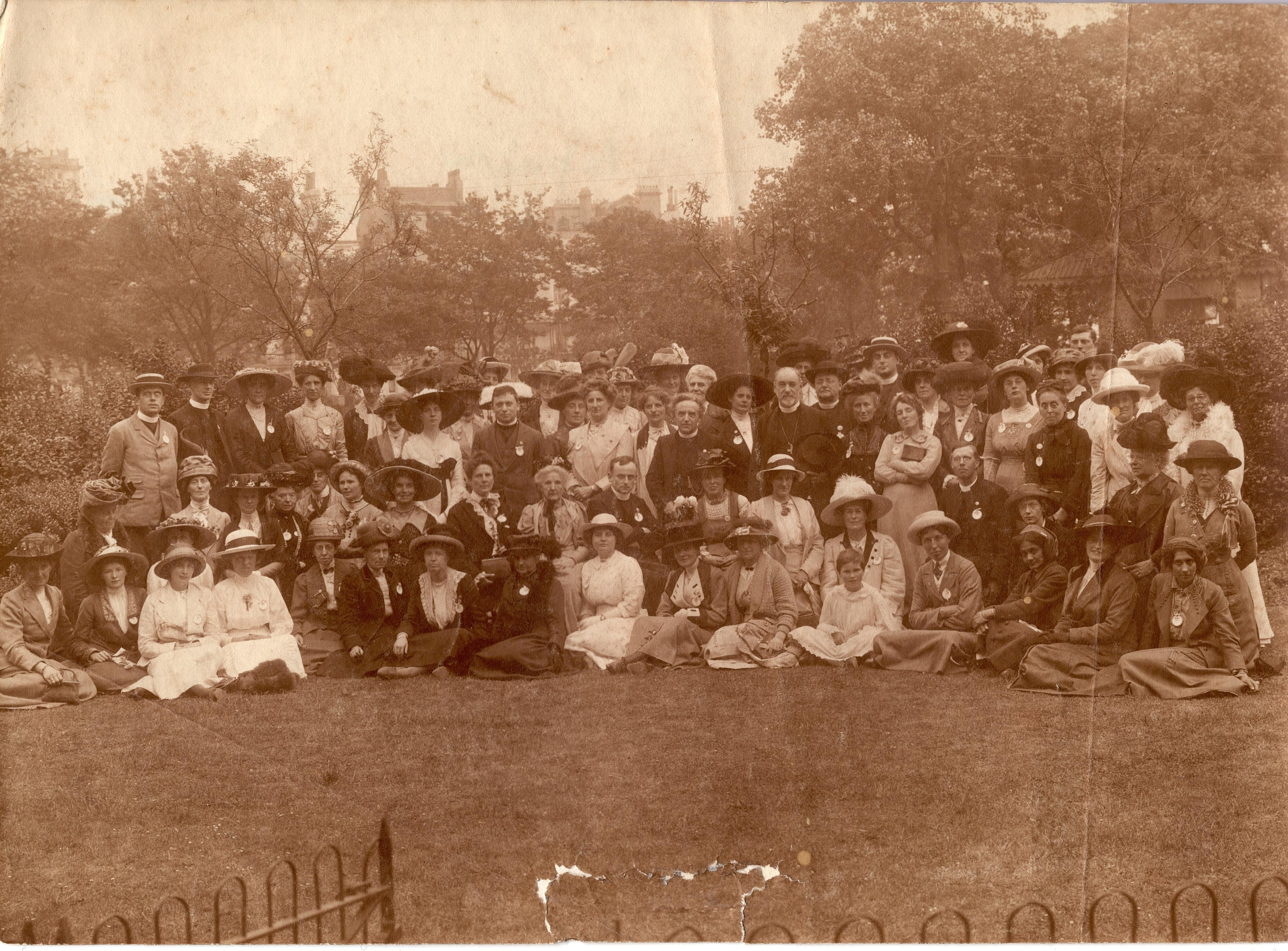
CLWS meeting in Brighton in 1913 by Muriel Darton, a photographer who worked pro bono for suffrage causes. Florence Canning is the lady without a hat in the centre within a ring of clergy.

Darton photographed the General Council of the Church League for Women's Suffrage at their meeting in Brighton on 2 July 1913. The photograph has been noted for demonstrating the hidden role undertaken by Indian women in the suffrage movement as two Indian women, Susila Bonnerjee and her sister are among the group.

She also took individual portraits of Edward Lee Hicks (Bishop of Lincoln) and Rev Claude Hinscliff, founder of the CLWS. These were sold through the CLWS and directly from Darton's business at 40 Stapleton Hall Road, Stroud Green, London. As a result of this, Darton began advertising in the CLWS newspaper, with testimonials from the Bishop and Rev Hinscliff in the September 1913 publication.

By February 1914, Darton was temporary secretary of the North Islington branch of the WSPU, a post which she held for some months, as well as continuing her photography business. She photographed mothers and babies at the South West Ham branch of the East London Federation of Suffragettes in December 1914. In September 1915 Darton wrote an article about photography in a section called “Careers for Women” in the CLWS newspaper, which encouraged women to take up the profession.

== Later life ==
Darton was one of the first British women to be allowed to vote. She first appears in the Electoral Register for 1919, living at Woodhouse Parade, High Road, North Finchley. She went on to run a photographic materials business with Dorothy Jolly in Crouch End, London.

Darton died at the Royal Cancer Hospital in London on 3 January 1945, aged 62.
