= East Meets East =

Studio album by Nigel Kennedy and the Kroke band
- Released: 10 June 2003
- Recorded: May 2002 – January 2003 at NLD and S-5 studios in Kraków, and at The Town House, Abbey Road studios in London. May 2003 at Eden, Metropolis, The Town House, Mayfair studios in London
- Genre: World music, fusion, klezmer, free jazz
- Length: 65:10
- Label: Oriente, EMI Classics
- Producer: Jaz Coleman, John Stanley

Nigel Kennedy chronology
Vivaldi (2003)	East Meets East (2003)	Vivaldi II (2004)

Kroke chronology
Sounds of the Vanishing World (1999)	East Meets East (2003)	Ten Pieces to Save the World (2003)

East Meets East is a collaborative studio album released through EMI Classics in 2003 by violinist Nigel Kennedy and the Kroke band (Jerzy Bawoł on accordion, Tomasz Kukurba on viola and Tomasz Lato on double bass), surrounded by several guest artists of international reputation such as Natacha Atlas, Mo Foster, and the Kraków Philharmonic Orchestra.

The album revisits some traditional songs and new compositions, ranging into central and eastern European music tradition as well as Arabic influences.

== Recording and production ==
Nigel Kennedy's second wife, Agnieszka, is Polish and they spend a lot of time in Kraków, where Kennedy is the Artistic Director of the Polish Chamber Orchestra. In summer 2001, Kennedy, who had previously known Jerzy Bawoł, Tomasz Kukurba and Tomasz Lato separately at jam sessions in the jazz clubs of Kraków, and Kroke meet during a concert tour in Cornwall. Kennedy immediately presented the group a cooperation offer. The result was East Meets East.

East Meets East was recorded between May 2002 and January 2003 at NLD and S-5 recording studios in Kraków, and at The Town House and Abbey Road studios in London. The album was consequently mixed on the following May by Andy Green, Dariusz Grela and Hugo Nicholson at Eden, Metropolis, Town House and Mayfair studios in London, and mastered by Ian Cooper at Metropolis studio. The album, published by Oriente Musik and internationally distributed through the classical music label of EMI from June 2003, was produced by John Stanley and Jaz Coleman. East Meets East has been top of the classical charts since its release, Kroke was nominated for the BBC Radio 3 award in the World Music category, and both Kroke and Kennedy played together at numerous European festivals for promoting it and received enthusiastic applause. After East Meets East, Kroke released Ten Pieces to Save the World", and Kennedy next record saw a return to "Vivaldi" with his 2004 album Vivaldi II.

== Songs ==
The 14-track album features seven original tracks composed by Nigel Kennedy and the three Kroke, Jerzy Bawoł, Tomasz Kukurba and Tomasz Lato, and seven traditional songs all arranged by them. The album is a stylistic and topical potpourri of music fusion that features elements of Folk and World music with influences from the East European and Arabic music, inspired by the music of the Balkans, Romani and Gypsy people, and Jewish music, with klezmer and sephardic modes and scales. There are also elements of the Western music such as free jazz and rock, as well as the traditional music of Poland, polonaise, polka and mazurka. Because of this mixture of different elements and traditions, and the experimental nature of this work, its tone frequently turns from the desperate sadness to the extreme joy.

Nigel Kennedy is the only person who walks between my two worlds [classical music and rock music]

—Jaz Coleman, BBC World Service's The Music Biz. 2003.

It was a very fortuitous meeting I had with Kroke — who are just this trio, with just a squeezebox, bass and viola — It's a really spiritual sound they make. [...] It sounds like an orchestra, and it's just these three guys playing.

—Nigel Kennedy, BBC World Service's The Ticket. 2003.

What drags me into Kroke's music so successfully is this spiritual reality they have. It's honesty and sincerity in their music. [...] Something we were all looking for was not to clutter the music up, and to just go for the honesty of the melody and let things speak for themselves. [...] With Kroke, they're a unit, and they're a very strong band — it's not like you're having to lead all the time. [...] We're swapping ideas, either verbally, but most of the time just musically. [...] It's a very fine, healthy, equal relationship.

—Nigel Kennedy, BBC NEWS. 13 June 2003.

The opening track, "'Ajde Jano" is a Serbian kolo folk dance song. The vocals, sung in South Slavic languages, are provided by Natacha Atlas, a Belgian singer known for her fusion of Arabic and Western electronic music. The second track, "Lullaby for Kamila", was composed by Jerzy Bawoł, having first appeared on Kroke's The Sounds of the Vanishing World. This klezmer piece, along with "One Voice", is considered one of the best pieces of the entire album. "T 4.2" is an original composition by Kennedy and Kroke. This klezmer piece showcases Kennedy's electric violin in a very sonically interesting setting, while electric bass is provided by Mo Foster, and additional percussion by Miles Bould. "Eden", original title "The/A Garden of Eden", is a traditional klezmer song composed by American clarinetist, bandleader, and one of the pioneers of modern klezmer music Harry Kandel.

The following two tracks, "Dafino", original title "Dafino vino crveno" (Macedonian: Дафино вино црвено; Red Wine Dafina), and "Jovano Jovanke" (Macedonian: Јовано, Јованке, Bulgarian: Йовано, Йованке, Serbian: Jovano, Jovanke) are two traditional folk songs from the region of Macedonia, both very popular in the Balkans. "Ederlezi" is an "exquisitely refined" instrumental version of a popular folk song of the Romani minority in the Balkans. The effect produced by the four "is bittersweet as opposed to saccharine, which it might have become in the hands of lesser players." "Kazimierz", a traditional Polish song, is dedicated to the historical district of Kraków in Poland, best known for being home to a Jewish community in Kraków from the 14th century until the Second World War. "One Voice" is a klezmer piece composed by Bawoł, Kennedy, Kukurba and Lato. The track, which features additional percussion played by Miles Bould, and additional strings played by the Kraków Philharmonic Orchestra, is a showcase for the three widely varying violin styles of Kennedy, Kukurba and guest violinist Aboud Abdoul Aal. It is, along with "Lullaby for Kamila", not only one of the loveliest performances of Kennedy's recorded career, it is also one of the most gently affecting compositions committed to tape in any genre in recent memory.

"Tribute to Maria Tănase" is a traditional song dedicated to the renowned Romanian singer of Romanian folk music Maria Tănase. "Time 4 Time" is a klezmer song composed by Bawoł, Kennedy, Kukurba, and Lato. Additional percussion are provided by Miles Bould, while Kukurba provides a non-verbal falsetto. "Vino", composed by Bawoł, Kennedy, Kukurba and Lato, features elements of "Dafino vino crveno" and "Ederlezi". The electric bass is provided by Mo Foster, additional percussion by Miles Bould. "Lost in Time", composed by Bawoł, Kennedy, Kukurba and Lato, is an unaccompanied solo track where Kennedy's fine and expressive playing is in no way overcooked. The album's closing track, "Kukush" is a klezmer song composed by Bawoł, Kennedy, Kukurba and Lato that showcases Kennedy's electric violin in a very sonically interesting setting.

== Reception ==
Professional ratings
Review scores
Source	Rating
Allmusic	8/10 stars
Artistdirect	4/5 stars
BBC Music	(favourable)
Muza	4/5 stars

Nigel Kennedy's version of Vivaldi's Four Seasons, released in 2002, is the best-selling classical record of all time. East Meets East is a further musical experiment and another shift away from the classical music with which Nigel Kennedy is normally associated, and is reflective of his career, which has seen him experiment with so many types of music. Jon Lusk wrote in his review of the album for BBC Music that "The balance of upbeat and reflective material is well judged and sequenced. It's also nice to hear Kroke once again playing to their strengths."

The album was highly recommended by critic Rick Anderson, who wrote that it is an "eerily lovely collection of new compositions and folk tunes drawing on Polish and other Eastern European traditions. Teamed up with the Krakow band Kroke [...], Kennedy delivers a set of tunes that are, by turns, dramatic, soothing, emotionally tormented, and romantically yearning." Allmusic reviewer, Blair Sanderson, described the album as "an exploration of Eastern European music, presented in a fusion of popular styles without pandering to the classical audience with crossover concessions. [...] The musicians play well as an ensemble, perhaps most successfully in the vigorous dance style that reaches maximum frenzy in Kukush" giving the album eight stars out of ten.

== Track listing ==
All tracks are written by Nigel Kennedy, Jerzy Bawoł, Tomasz Kukurba, and Tomasz Lato unless otherwise noted. All traditional songs arranged by Nigel Kennedy and Kroke (Jerzy Bawoł, Tomasz Kukurba, Tomasz Lato).

No.	Title	Writer(s)	Guest performers	Length
1.	"Ajde Jano" (Traditional)	Traditional	Natacha Atlas (vocals)	4:24
2.	"Lullaby for Kamila"	Jerzy Bawoł, Nigel Kennedy, Tomasz Kukurba, Tomasz Lato		3:24
3.	"T 4.2"	Bawoł, Kennedy, Kukurba, Lato	Mo Foster (electric bass); Miles Bould (additional percussion)	6:11
4.	"Eden" (Harry Kandel, traditional)	Harry Kandel, traditional		6:06
5.	"Dafino" (Traditional)	Traditional		2:51
6.	"Jovano Jovanke" (Traditional)	Traditional		4:25
7.	"Ederlezi" (Traditional; credited to Goran Bregović on some CDs)	Traditional		5:47
8.	"Kazimierz" (Traditional)	Traditional		3:28
9.	"One Voice"	Bawoł, Kennedy, Kukurba, Lato	Miles Bould (additional percussion); Kraków Philharmonic Orchestra (additional strings); Aboud Abdul Aal (additional second violin)	4:54
10.	"Tribute to Maria Tanase" (Traditional)	Traditional		3:11
11.	"Time 4 Time"	Bawoł, Kennedy, Kukurba, Lato	Miles Bould (additional percussion)	5:21
12.	"Vino"	Bawoł, Kennedy, Kukurba, Lato	Mo Foster (electric bass); Miles Bould (additional percussion)	6:04
13.	"Lost in Time"	Bawoł, Kennedy, Kukurba, Lato		4:22
14.	"Kukush"	Bawoł, Kennedy, Kukurba, Lato		4:42
Total length:				65:10

== Personnel ==
- Nigel Kennedy – violin, electric violin

The Kroke band

- Jerzy Bawoł – accordion, additional vocals
- Tomasz Kukurba – viola, vocals, flute, percussion
- Tomasz Lato – double bass

Guest performers

- Natacha Atlas – vocals on "Ajde Jano"
- Mo Foster – electric bass on "T 4.2" and "Vino"
- Miles Bould – additional percussion on "T 4.2", "One Voice", "Time 4 Time" and "Vino"
- Kraków Philharmonic Orchestra – additional strings on "One Voice"
- Aboud Abdul Aal – second violin on "One Voice"

Production

- Jaz Coleman – producer
- John Stanley – liner notes, producer
- Andy Green – engineer, mixing, mixing engineer
- Dariusz Grela – engineer, mixing, mixing engineer
- Wojciech Gruszka – engineer
- Sam O'Kell – engineer
- Hugo Nicholson – mixing, mixing engineer
- Ian Cooper – mastering
- Annabel Wright – illustration
- Paul Mitchell – design

== Charts and awards ==
The album was well received and has also hit the United States charts. The success of the album, along with its promotional tour, led Kroke to be nominated for the Europe category at the BBC Awards for World Music in 2004.

Chart (2003)	Peak position
Billboard Classical Albums	46

=== Certifications ===
Region	Certification	Certified units/sales
Poland (ZPAV)	Gold	35,000^{*}
^{*} Sales figures based on certification alone.
