= Robert Gregory (priest) =

Anglican Dean (1819–1911)

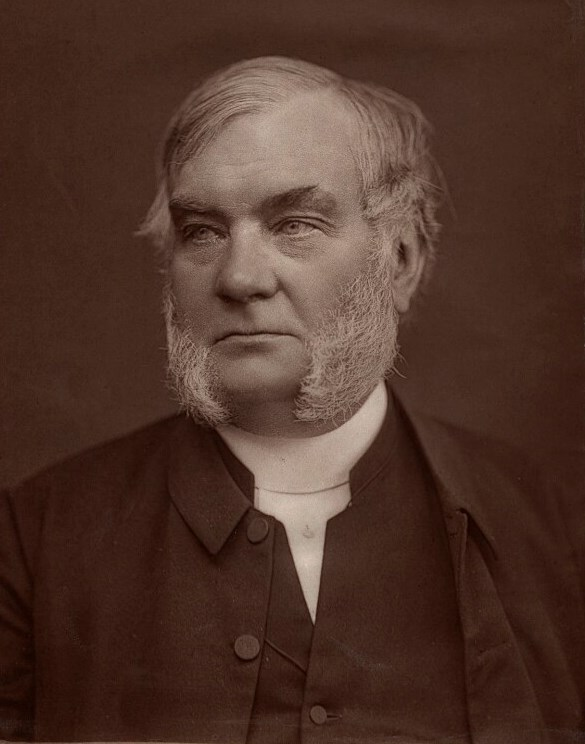
- Born: 9 February 1819
- Died: 2 August 1911 (aged 92)

Robert Gregory (9 February 1819 – 2 August 1911) was an Anglican Dean.

== Early life ==
Gregory was born on 9 February 1819. He was educated at Corpus Christi College, Oxford. There he won the Denyer Theological Prize Essay Prize.

He was ordained in 1843 and began his career with a curacies at Bisley, Wragby, and Lambeth. Gregory was later Vicar of St Mary the Less in Lambeth from 1853 to 1873. After this, he was a Canon at St Paul's Cathedral before succeeding to the Deanery in 1891. In 1873, he was elected to the School Board for London. He died on 2 August 1911.

== Family ==
Gregory married in 1844 Mary Frances. They had two sons, including Francis Ambrose Gregory, who later became Bishop of Mauritius. His wife died in 1851, and ten years later he married Charlotte Anne Stopford. By his second marriage, he had three daughters who survived him. The last was Alice Gregory, who revolutionised the training of British midwifery by setting up the British Hospital for Mothers and Babies.

== Notes ==
Church of England titles
Preceded by Richard William Church	Dean of St Paul's; 1891 – 1911	Succeeded by William Ralph Inge
