= Strad Jazz =

Studio album by Nigel Kennedy and Peter Pettinger
- Released: April 1984
- Recorded: 7 January 1984
- Studio: St George the Martyr, Bloomsbury (London)
- Genres: Jazz; classical jazz; standards
- Length: 54:57
- Labels: Warner Bros.; Warner Music
- Producer: Brian Couzens

Nigel Kennedy chronology
Strad Jazz (1984)	Violin Sonata (1984)

Strad Jazz is the debut studio album by English classical violinist Nigel Kennedy, recorded in collaboration with his frequent recital partner and pianist, Peter Pettinger, and released by Chandos Records in April 1984. Its catalogue number is CHAN 8350. Strad Jazz has also been released on CD by Chandos at various points under the name Nigel Kennedy Plays Jazz.

The album presents a late-night jam session of jazz duets recorded spontaneously without rehearsal and released without editing. It was recorded casually following the two musicians' session performing Edward Elgar's Violin Sonata (1918), also released as an album by Chandos. Having recorded the sonata and a set of 'salon' pieces with Chandos producer Brian Couzens, Kennedy and Pettinger still had five hours left of recording time, which they spent performing an impromptu jam session while Couzens left the tapes recording. Strad Jazz is the result. Kennedy explained: "We finished the Elgar piece with time to spare so we went and 'had a few drinks', came back and Brian Couzens, the producer, tapes the numbers and luckily we got it out alive!"

The session, which Kennedy deemed "good fun", took place on 7 January 1984 at St George the Martyr, Bloomsbury, London. The Strad magazine describes the name Strad Jazz as "a witty and not inappropriate appellation" as Kennedy had recently acquired a Stradivari violin left to him in the will of a woman who enjoyed one of his performances of the Elgar concerto. The Stradivari violin inspired the album title.

It was not Kennedy's first foray into jazz, as in an earlier concert at the Queen Elizabeth Hall, he balanced a programme of classical composers ike Ravel, Gershwin, Bartok and Brahms with a jazz encore, featuring a spontaneous jazz version of the "blues" movement from Ravel's Violin Sonata No. 2, and an improvised version of Stevie Wonder's "Isn't She Lovely". Wonder biographer James E. Perone, who described Strad Jazz as a "classical-jazz crossover album", highlighted Kennedy's (and Pettinger's) version of "Isn't She Lovely", with Kennedy being the second "unconventional violinist" to record a cover of Wonder's work in the era, following jazz-rock fusion violinist Jean-Luc Ponty's interpretation of "As" for the record Mystical Adventures (1982). Kennedy had also played in jazz clubs early in his career, including Ronnie Scott's Jazz Club and in Greenwich Village sites.

One inclusion on the album, the Django Reinhardt and Stephane Grappelli composition "Swing '39", is notable because Grappelli was a mentor of Kennedy's at the Menuhin School and first introduced the younger musician to jazz violin. A talismanic photograph of Grappelli and Kennedy together appears in the artwork.

== Critical reception ==
Parts of the album were hailed by music critics for their innovation, such as the unusual pairing of two 1940s pieces. The Times, who describe it as Kennedy's first jazz work, noted that the title "misled many jazz buffs into expecting something in the mould of Grappelli, Kennedy's early jazz mentor." As Kennedy explained, "A lot of people were disappointed because it didn't sound like Sleph. You know it was called Strad Jazz? Well, they thought that meant trad."

Nicolas Soames in Music Week writes that although classical musicians' detours into jazz are typically "patronising, embarrassing or both," Strad Jazz is neither, noting its variety of material. He said the album will surely receive heavy publicity, but believed it would be lamentable if the record wholly overshadowed Kennedy's "classical recording debut with the Elgar Sonata (ABRD 1099 and on cassette) which has been a curiously long time in coming." Music Magazine called it "utterly original and without artifice."

Hi-Fi News & Record Review, emphasising its status as an unrehearsed, unedited jam session, warned that listeners' enjoyment would "depend entirely on how you feel about the public display of self-indulgence." The reviewer compared Kennedy poorly with his mentor Grappelli, saying that while Grappelli is a light violinist, Kennedy is "heavy handed, inelegant his slides, scratchy in bowing (unhelped by the 'macro-focus' of the miking) and, worst of all, capable of some ear-wincingly flat intonation and drooping pitch. I find this disc inelegant and all too self-indulgent." Jazz Journal International reflected in 1987 that Strad Jazz was "less than fully satisfying". AllMusic rated the original album two stars out of five, and the Plays Jazz release three-and-a-half stars. Dennis Palkow of The Chicago Tribune contextualised Strad Jazz in 1989:

"In the often stodgy world of classical music, exclusivity is usually the rule. Young British violinist Nigel Kennedy apparently didn't know that and has garnered a reputation as an outstanding performer in jazz and rock circles as well. His jazz gigs include an LP, Strad Jazz, touring with Stephane Grappelli, and violin arrangements of Ellington classics."

The author Timothy Spfaff, writing in the collection 21st Century Violinists (2011), describes Play Jazz as a "remarkable disc" of jazz standards laid down entirely spontaneously and completely unrehearsed. Comparing the session back-to-back with the Elgar recording done earlier the same day, Spaff found it hard to believe that Kennedy is "playing the same instrument on both, so distinctive and idiomatic for jazz is the sound he draws from it." Kennedy told BBC Music Magazine in 2006: "I wouldn't call it a jazz album. It's more a spontaneous recording that me and the pianist Peter Pettinger made after recording some Elgar. We had some time on our hands so we thought 'Why waste it? Let's make another album'. What would I call it? 'The one with piano and violin'.

== ITV programme ==
On 22 September 1985, the Central Independent Television production Strad Jazz was broadcast by ITV, depicting a recent Kennedy concert at the Derngate Centre, Nottingham; in a review of the LWT broadcast, Music & Musicians wrote that Kennedy demonstrated "his mastery of jazz and pop in addition to his gifts as a classical musician." Kennedy, reflecting on the ITV show, says it also showed him interviewed by jazz expert Peter Clayton. Central Video released the virtuosic performance on VHS in 1987.

== Track listing ==
=== Side one ===
1. "Body and Soul" (Edward Heyman, Laub, Johnny Green, Robert Sour) – 8:37
2. "Bag's Groove" (Milt Jackson) – 9:23
3. "Autumn Leaves" (Johnny Mercer, Joseph Kosma) – 9:32

=== Side two ===
1. "Swing '39" (Django Reinhardt, Stephane Grappelli) – 6:05
2. "Isn't She Lovely" (Stevie Wonder) – 4:23
3. "Lover Man" (Jimmy Davis, Jimmy Sherman, Roger Ramirez) – 9:21
4. "The Girl from Ipanema" (Antônio Carlos Jobim – 7:10

== Personnel ==
Adapted from the liner notes of Strad Jazz

- Nigel Kennedy – violin, sleeve notes
- Peter Pettinger – piano
- Brian Couzens – producer, engineer

== See also ==
- Third stream
