= Dafino vino crveno =

Folk song from the region of Macedonia

"Dafino vino crveno" (Macedonian/Bulgarian: Дафино вино црвено/цървено; English translation: Red Wine Dafina) is а folk song from the region of Macedonia. It is about a girl called Dafina and her boyfriend.

== Explanation of the lyrics ==
According to the lyrics of the song, some hajduci stole the coat of Dafina's boy (the native text uses specifically the words "momche to ti" which does not imply boyfriend, it could mean her boy, which could make Dafina's his relative or a promised to be married man) while he had fallen asleep on the mountain Karakamen (situated nowadays in Greece) and then sold it for wine and rakia. The song was noted in 1908 by the Bulgarian composer Dobri Hristov. Dobri Hristov noted it from Kiril Hristov from Bitola, father of the famous Bulgarian opera singer Boris Hristov. Both Kiril and Dobri worked at that time as high school teachers in Sofia. In 1931 the Macedonian Scientific Institute published the book "66 Folk Songs of the Macedonian Bulgarians". All the songs were selected and noted by Hristov and this song was among them.

== Interpretations of the song ==
This song has been performed by many Macedonian folk singers such as: Nikola Badev, Goce Arnaudov, and Ibush Ibraimovski. There also exist non-folk versions of the song, such as the one by Nigel Kennedy, Karolina, Garo and the Tavitjan brothers; this cover was made as a part of the project "Makedonija zasekogash" in which various Macedonian pop stars perform several traditional folk songs.
