= Anglican Group for the Ordination of Women to the Historic Ministry =

The Anglican Group for the Ordination of Women to the Historic Ministry of the Church existed from 1930 to 1978. By research, education, publicity, and memorials to the church, it pushed the Church of England and the whole Anglican Communion to admit women to the historic three-fold ministry (bishops, priests, and deacons). By the time the organization disbanded in 1978, women had been ordained priests in four provinces of the Anglican Communion.

== Founding and objectives ==
Between the 1920 and 1930 Lambeth Conferences, the League of the Church Militant pushed for the ordination of women. However, it had been associated with the suffrage cause as a successor to the Church League for Women's Suffrage, so it broke up shortly before the 1930 Conference. It was replaced by the Anglican Group for the Ordination of Women (AGOW).

The Anglican Group for the Ordination of Women to the Historic Ministry founding vice-presidents were the Bishop of Lichfield John Kempthorne and the Dean of Canterbury Dick Sheppard. Its council included several "prominent Anglican clergy" and "prominent women" the Headmistress of Roedean School, the actress Dame Sybil Thorndike, its first secretary was Mrs. Ronald Best.

"Membership of the organisation was open to all baptised Anglicans over the age of 18 and it was financed by donation rather than by subscription. Business and policy making was in the hands of the Annual General Meeting, where the annual report was received and officers and the Executive Committee elected (the first annual meeting was held March 1933)."

The overall purpose of AGOW was "to secure the admission of women to the Ministry", and "to secure effective expression the Christian principle of spiritual equality between men and women by urging upon the Church of England the admission of women to the threefold ministry of bishops, priests, and deacons."

Its immediate and more specific task was to prepare material for the upcoming 1930 Lambeth Conference.

In preparation for the Lambeth Conference of the Anglican Communion's Bishops in the summer of 1930 the Archbishop of Canterbury Cosmo Gordon Lang requested that the church be provided material "which would compel the serious consideration of [the ordination of women] in a manner worthy of its importance" and give means of contact with "women who believe themselves called to the ministry".

The Anglican Group for the Ordination of Women to the Historic Ministry of the Church was at this point an ad hoc group established to provide the evidence Archbishop Lang had requested. The group adopted a resolution for the 1930 Conference:

Resolution: That this Council reaffirms its conviction that the full ministry of religion should be open to both sexes, and, further, it urges upon the Archbishops and Bishops of the Established Church of England the importance of dealing with this matter at the forthcoming Lambeth Conference.

However, the AGOW's position was rejected by the Conference. To the contrary, the Conference "took a step backwards in the matter of women’s ordination." It reversed its 1920 position by declaring that deaconesses were not female deacons but laywomen." This resolution stated that a Deaconess was not "identical in character and perhaps also in status with the Third Order of the Ministry" and removed of the term "Holy" from the Order of Deaconesses.

== History and activity as an ongoing organization ==
Given the new situation, what had been an ad hoc group was re-established as an ongoing organisation after the Conference. It held its first meeting in March 1933. Its new purposes were stated as follows:

(1) upholding "the Christian principle of spiritual equality between men and women";

(2) drawing attention to "the growing need for the admission of women to the...ministry of the Church" and

(3) bringing together and supporting "those women who believe themselves to be called to holy orders".

The ordination of women in the Church of England was the group's only concern during its whole existence. It also worked with the Society for the Ministry of Women in the Church. This was a non-denominational organization concerned for the ministry of women in the church as a whole.

During the rest of the 1930s, the group's position having been rejected by the 1930 Lambeth Conference, the group limited its public activities to "intermittent public meetings." However, it continued to research the issue of women's ordination. For example, the group "conducted two research surveys among its missionaries worldwide to investigate the feasibility of ordaining deaconesses to the priesthood in response to the needs on the mission field." It was found that in China the missionaries were "overwhelming in favor" of it.

== The Second World War and after ==
The group suspended all activities during the Second World War. During the war, on January 25, 1944, Florence Li Tim-Oi was ordained an Anglican priest in China, accomplishing for the first time what the group had been advocating.

After the war of the Anglican Group for the Ordination of Women to the Historic Ministry of the Church held a meeting in 1946. However, as an organisation, the group seems to have "lost its impetus" as evidenced by the fact that it held only three general meetings between 1949 and 1957.

During the early 1950s, the group engaged in no activity that might begin "a debate on the issue of the ordination of women in the Church of England. Rather, it worked only on "research and education". In 1952, the AGOW had "approximately 200 men and women members".

In 1955, the AGOW submitted a report to the church that "recommended that women should be allowed to conduct statutory services (though not communion)." However, again, the church rejected the AGOW's recommendation.

As a result of this rejection by the church, the AGOW "began again to campaign directly for women priests." For example, the group began to make its existence known through letters to The Times newspaper.

As part of its direct campaign, the AGOW rewrote its constitution in 1957. Its stated objectives were now as follows:

(1) to secure ordination of women to all orders of the Church of England;

(2) promote equality between men and women in the offices and the affairs of the Anglican Church; (3) assist women in theological study; and

(4) to undertake all lawful activities to promote the previous points.

During the 1960s, the groups efforts focussed on "raising awareness of the issue in the media through contacts with the press and publications": publications such as those listed in the section on Works below. By such efforts the AGOW hoped "to build up an informed public opinion within the Church of England concerning the church's refusal to ordain women to the three-fold ministry."

== Objectives realized and disbanding ==
The objectives of the AGOW began to be realized in 1960 by "the gradual acceptance of female ordination within the Anglican Communion".

- The 1968 Lambeth Conference's Resolution 34 stated that the theological arguments for and against female ordination are both inconclusive.
- In 1974, three bishops of the American Episcopal Church ordained eleven women.
- In 1975, The Anglican Church of Canada authorized female ordination.
- In 1976, the General Convention of the Episcopal Church in the United States of America passed a resolution declaring that "no one shall be denied access" to ordination into the three orders of ministry: as deacons, priests or bishops, on the basis of their sex.

Kenneth Woollcombe, Bishop of Oxford, was serving as president of the AGOW as its objectives were being realized. Thus, he presided the organization's disbanding in 1978.

The disbanding of the AGOW came before the Anglican Church of England, that had been its primary objective from which its members came, ordained women. It was not until 12 March 1994, after the necessary legislation had been passed, that the first women priests in the Church of England were ordained.

In the late 1970s, the Movement for the Ordination of Women formed, which has been succeeded by Women and the Church.

== Archives ==
In 1987, the AGOW's papers were deposited in the Fawcett Library (now the Women's Library).

== Works ==
Written by or for or published by the Anglican Group for the Ordination of Women to the Historic Ministry of the Church. The following works are listed in the WorldCat.

- Anglican Group for the Ordination of Women, A Conference on the Ministry of Women with Special Reference to the Report of the Archbishops' Commission, held at the College of the Ascension, Selly Oak, Birmingham, September 1936, organised by the Anglican Group for the Ordination of Women to the Historic Ministry of the Church (London: Anglican Group for the Ordination of Women, 1936)
- E. Louie Acres, The Mission Field and the Ordination of Women (London: Anglican Group for the Ordination of Women, 1939)
- Evelyn W. Hippisley, Women's Work for the Church (London: Anglican Group for the Ordination of Women, 1939)
- Henrietta Caroline Escreet, A Question for Churchwomen (Anglican Group for the Ordination of Women to the Historic Ministry of the Church, 193-?)
- Henry Thomas Malaher, A Memorial Submitted to the Lambeth Conference 1948 on Deaconesses (London: Anglican Group for the Ordination of Women, 1948)
- Anglican Group for the Ordination of Women, Women & Holy Orders: Why Raise Such a Controversial Question Now? (London : The Anglican Group for the Ordination of Women to the Historic Ministry of the Church, 195-?)
- O. Jessie Lace, The Ordination of Women to the Historic Ministry of the Church Considered in the Light of Scripture (Anglican Group for the Ordination of Women to the Historic Ministry of the Church, 1958)
- Anglican Group for the Ordination of Women, The Question of Women and Holy Orders: a Memorandum to the Committee set up in 1963 by the Archbishops of Canterbury and York to Examine the Whole Question of Women and Holy Orders (London: Anglican Group for the Ordination of Women, 1963)
- G. W. H. Lampe, The Church's Tradition and the Question of the Ordination of Women to the Historic Ministry (Midhurst, Sussex: Anglican Group for the Ordination of Women, 1967)
- Leonard Hodgson, Theological Objections to the Admission of Women to Holy Orders (London: Anglican Group for the Ordination of Women to the Historic Ministry of the Church, 1967)
- Anglican Group for the Ordination of Women and Anglican Consultative Council Meeting, Extracts Referring to the Ordination of Women from "The Time is Now": the Report of the Anglican Consultative Council - First Meeting in Limuru, Kenya, February 23 - March 5, 1971 (Society for Promoting Christian Knowledge, 1971?)
- Anglican Group for the Ordination of Women, The Present and the Future Women's Ministry in the Church of England: Report of a One Day Conference, Saturday, 30 September 1972 (Midhurst, Sussex: Anglican Group for the Ordination of Women to the Historic Ministry of the Church, 1972)
- Mollie Batten, Women in the Church (Midhurst, Sussex : Anglican Group for the Ordination of Women to the Historic Ministry of the Church, 1972?)
- Margaret J. Roxburgh, Women's Ministry in the Church of England: Notes on the Past and Present Position with Questions for the Future (Midhurst, Sussex: Anglican Group for the Ordination of Women to the Historic Ministry of the Church, 1972)
- K. J. Woollcombe and J. V. Taylor, No Fundamental Objections to the Ordination of Women to the Priesthood (Midhurst, Sussex: Anglican Group for the Ordination of Women to the History Ministry of the Church, 1975?)
- Anglican Group for the Ordination of Women, Seven Good Reasons for Ordaining Women Priests Now (Anglican Group for the Ordination of Women to the Historic Ministry of the Church, date?)

== See also ==
- Ordination of women in the Anglican Communion
- Wikipedia List of the first 32 women ordained as Church of England priests
