= Jessie Landale Cumberland =

British suffragette (1861–1935)

- Born: c. 1861; Nainital, North-Western Provinces, British India
- Died: 11 March 1935; Wimbledon, London, England
- Organisation(s): Women's Social and Political Union (WSPU); Church League for Women's Suffrage
- Awards: Hunger Strike Medal

Jessie Landale Cumberland (1861 – 11 March 1935) was a British governess and suffragette. She was a member of the Women's Social and Political Union (WSPU) and the Church League for Women's Suffrage and was awarded the Hunger Strike Medal.

== Biography ==
Cumberland was born in 1861 at Nainital, North-Western Provinces, British India (present-day Uttarakhand, India). Her parents were Richard Felix Wilson Cumberland and Jessie Maria Landale. Before she was aged ten, Landale had moved to England and was living with her widowed aunt in Bognor Regis, West Sussex.

Cumberland worked as a governess and lived in Brunswick Terrace in Hove, East Sussex. She became active in the women's suffrage movement, as a member of the Women's Social and Political Union (WSPU) and the Church League for Women's Suffrage. She participated in the Black Friday suffrage protest on 18 November 1910 as a member of the WSPU deputation, but was not arrested on that occasion. Cumberland was arrested in November 1911 and in 1914. After her 1914 arrest, she was sentenced to imprisonment at Holloway Prison and went on hunger strike, aged 53. She was awarded the Hunger Strike Medal.

Cumberland died in Wimbledon, London, England, on 11 March 1935.

In 2023, Cumberland's Hunger Strike Medal sold for £18,270 at auction.
