= Alice Gregory =

British midwife (1867–1946)

- Born: 22 November 1867; Lambeth, England
- Died: 8 November 1946 (aged 78); Alfriston, England
- Occupations: midwife, hospital manager
- Known for: founding British Hospital for Mothers and Babies
- Parent: Robert Gregory

Alice Sophia Gregory (22 November 1867 – 8 November 1946) was a British midwife who founded the British Hospital for Mothers and Babies to create professional training for midwives.

== Life ==
Gregory was born in Lambeth in 1867. Her parents were Charlotte Anne (born Stopford) and Robert Gregory. Her father was in the Church of England and in time he would be the dean of St Paul's Cathedral. She was their last of three daughters who survived them. She had half brothers from her father's first marriage.

Gregory intended to ensure that all midwives were trained. She wanted to end the idea of a "handywoman" (cf traditional birth attendant) who would assist home births. The Home for Mothers and Babies in Wood Street, Woolwich opened in May 1905 due to her efforts which was assisted by the local Rector of Woolwich Charles Escreet. She was assisted by Leila Parnell and Maud Cashmere. The hospital soon had twelve beds but it first opened with just six beds. Its purpose was to provide a service and to establish a training location for midwives. This hospital amalgamated in 1915 with the British Lying-In Hospital, Holborn.

In 1916 Gregory as "Honorary Secretary of the British Hospital for Mothers and Babies" gave evidence before the commission on venereal diseases (sexually transmitted infections). She argued to lengthen the training of midwives, which was then six months for a nurse and a year for a new application. She noted that babies had died because midwives were unaware of these diseases and on occasions the midwives spread and rarely themselves caught the disease. The stigma of this meant that this was not openly discussed.

During World War II the hospital was damaged in a bombing raid in 1940. Alice Gregory was still working at the hospital and she arranged for a new wing which was opened by the Princess Royal in 1944. Gregory retired on medical grounds in June 1944 and went to live with Maud Cashmere. She died in retirement in their house near Alfriston in November 1946.
