= St George's, Bloomsbury =

Church in London, England

Coordinates: 51°31′03.23″N 00°07′28.78″W

- Parish Church of Saint George in Bloomsbury
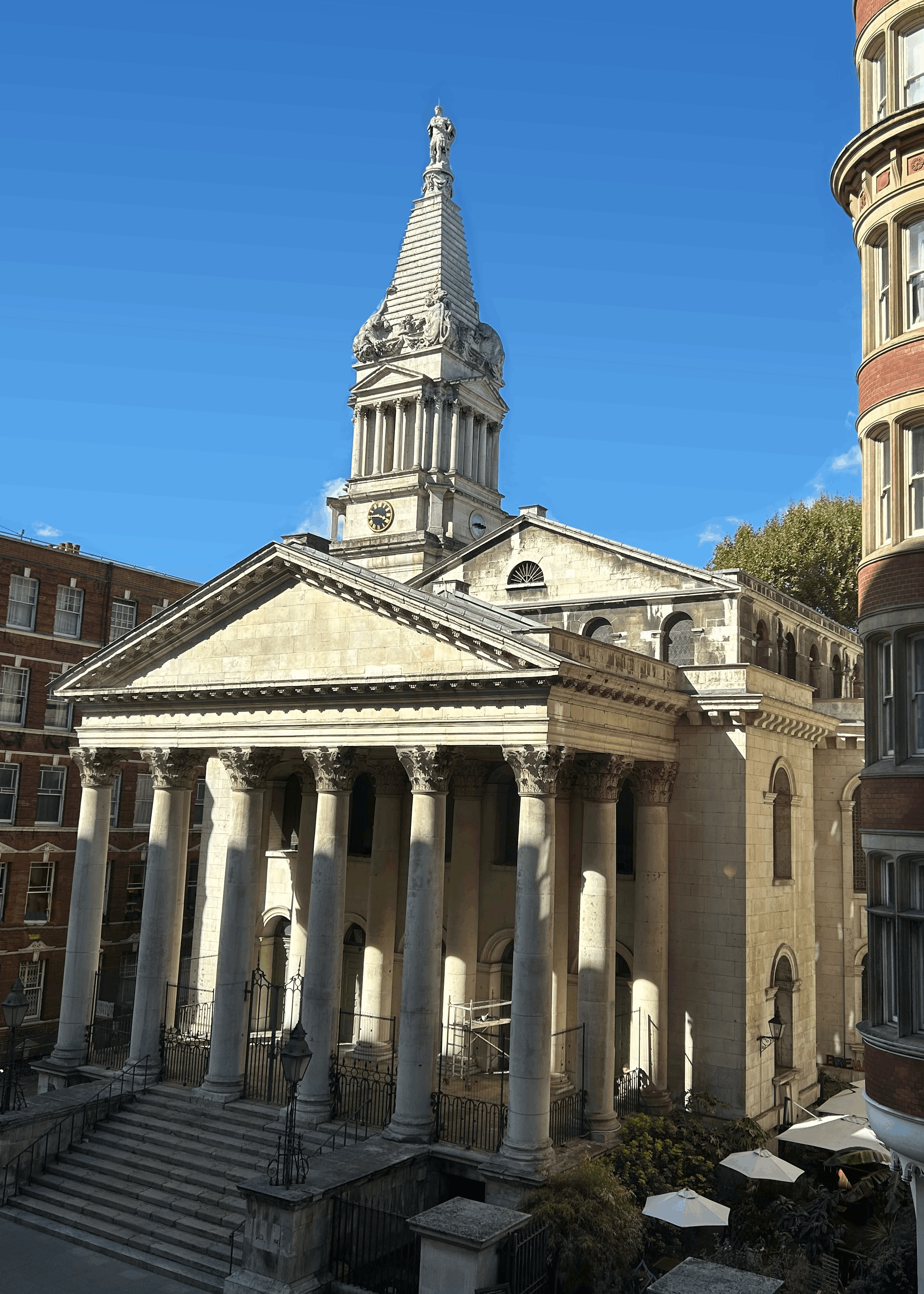
- St George's, Bloomsbury
- Location: Bloomsbury Way, Bloomsbury, London WC1A 2SA
- Country: England
- Denomination: Church of England
- Churchmanship: Anglo-Catholic
- Website: stgeorgesbloomsbury.org.uk

History
- Founded: 1730

Architecture
- Heritage designation: Grade I
- Architect: Nicholas Hawksmoor
- Style: Classical

Administration
- Diocese: London

Clergy
- Rector: David Peebles

St George's, Bloomsbury, is a parish church in Bloomsbury, London Borough of Camden, United Kingdom. It was designed by Nicholas Hawksmoor and consecrated in 1730. The church crypt houses the Museum of Comedy.

== History ==
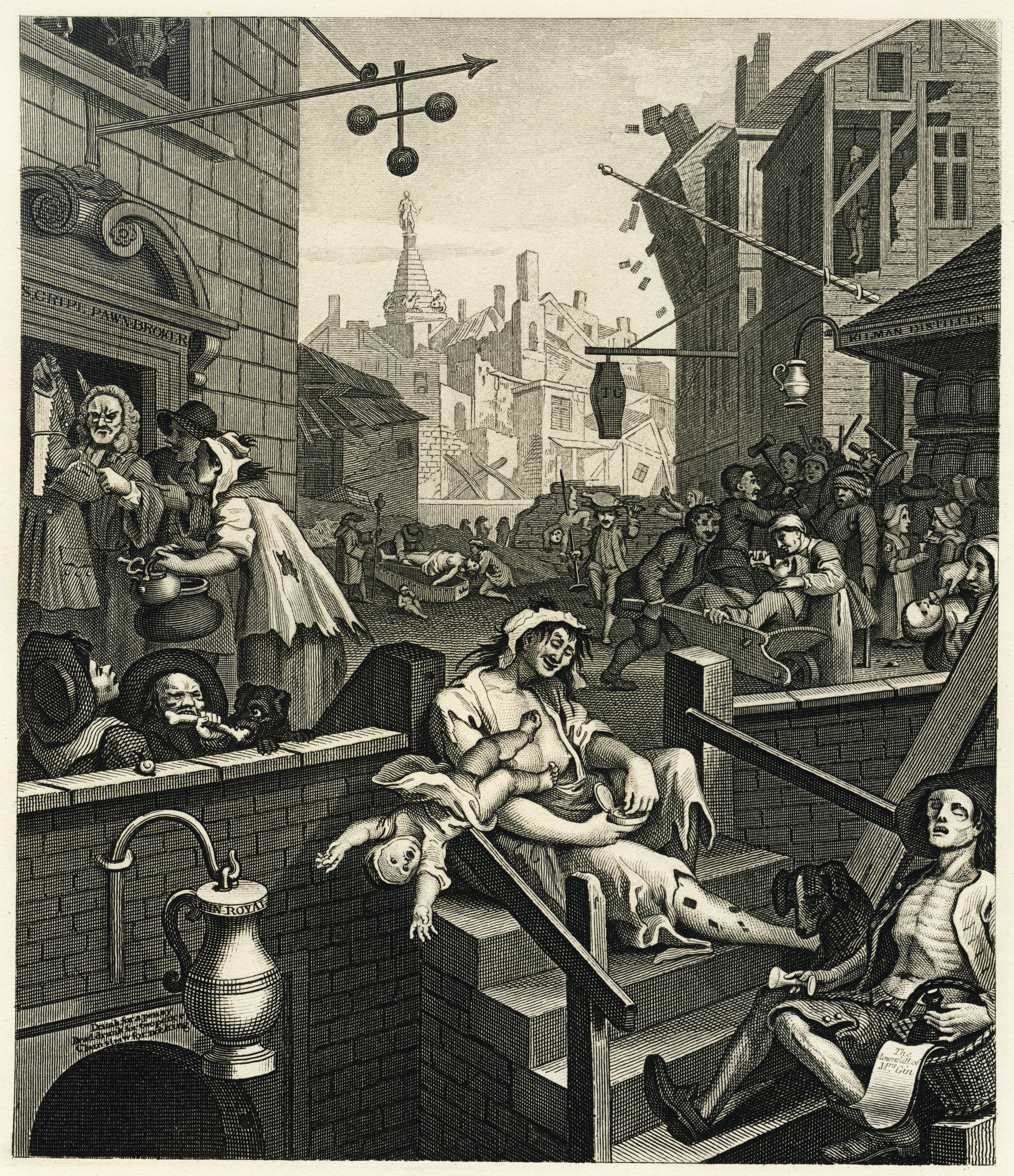
William Hogarth, Gin Lane, with the church tower (centre)

The Commissioners for the Fifty New Churches realised that, due to rapid development in the Bloomsbury area during the latter part of the 17th and early part of the 18th centuries, the area (then part of the parish of St Giles in the Fields) needed to be split off and obtain a parish church of its own. They appointed Nicholas Hawksmoor, a pupil and former assistant of Sir Christopher Wren, to design and build this church, which he then did between 1716 and 1731. This was the sixth and last of his London churches. St George's was consecrated on 28 January 1730 by Edmund Gibson, Bishop of London. Its construction-—which cost £31,000--was completed in 1731.

The Victorian novelist Anthony Trollope was baptised at the church in 1824. The wedding of F. B. Chatterton, manager of the Theatre Royal, Drury Lane, took place in 1853. Richard Meux Benson, founder of the first Anglican religious order for men, the Society of St John the Evangelist (also known as the "Cowley Fathers"), was baptised in the church. A funeral service for Emily Davison, the suffragette who died when she was hit by the King's horse during the 1913 Derby, took place that same year. The funeral was officiated by Claude Hinscliff and Charles Baumgarten, both part of the Church League for Women's Suffrage. Emperor Haile Selassie of Ethiopia attended a controversial requiem for the dead of the Abyssinian War in 1937.

Until 2006 the church was the subject of major conservation work led by the World Monuments Fund and was closed to visitors, with the congregation continuing in a nearby chapel. The building reopened fully from October 2006, featuring a new exhibition about the church, Hawksmoor and Bloomsbury housed in its undercroft.

== Architecture ==
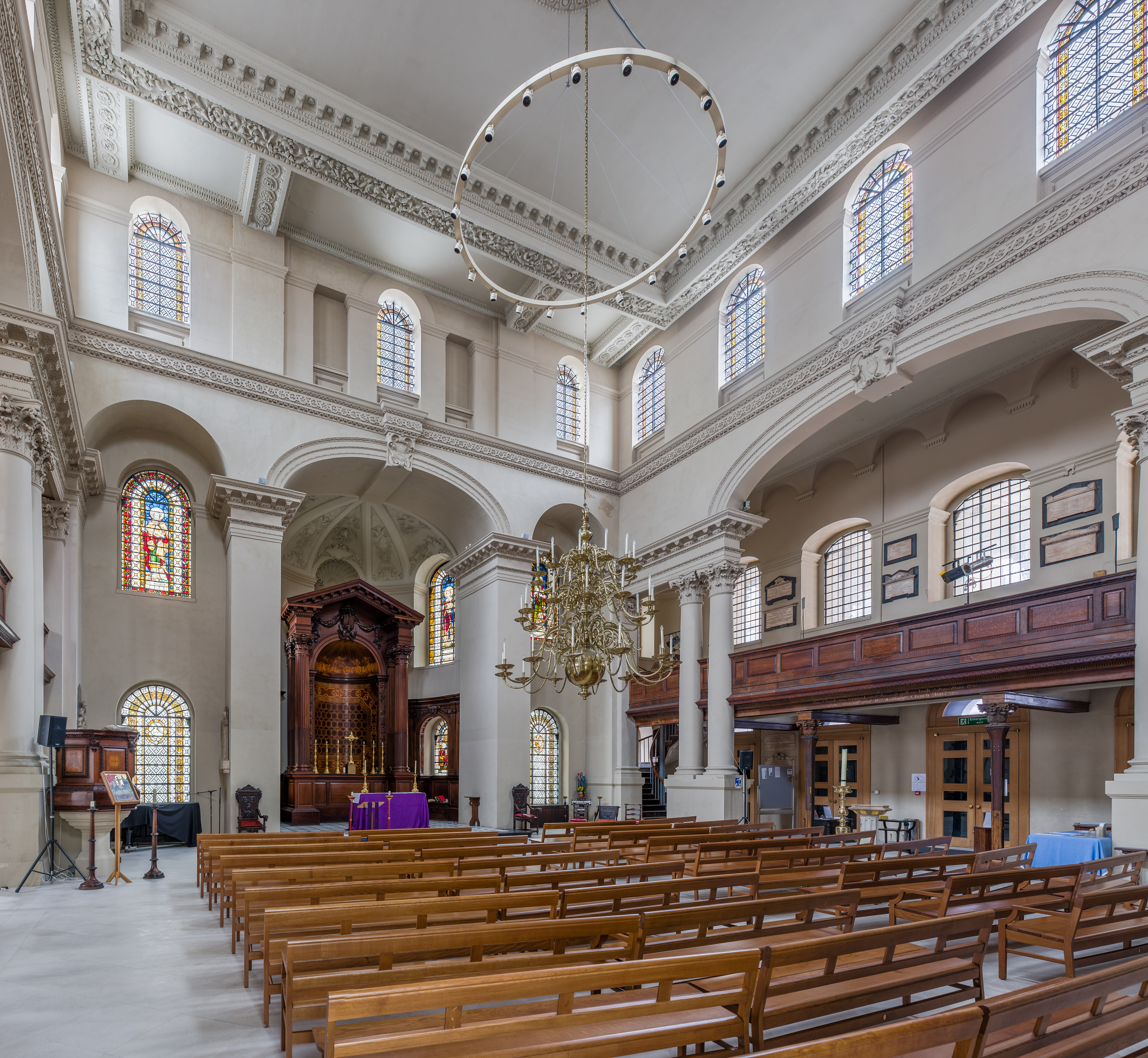
Interior

The land on which the church is built ("Ploughyard") was bought for £1,000 from Lady Russell, widow of the Whig rebel William Russell, Lord Russell who had been executed in 1683. This was a substantial sum and its expenditure on a narrow and rectangular plot of land on a north–south axis, hemmed in by buildings on all sides, seemed to fly in the face of the commissioners' 1711 stipulation that "no site ought to be pitched upon for the erecting [of] a new church where the same will not admit the church to be placed East and West". Perhaps the orientation of the site was deemed a surmountable obstacle, especially since the site met the needs of the commissioners in that it was situated "amongst the… better sort ... [and on] the larger and more open streets, not in obscure lanes, nor where coaches will be much obstructed in the passage." In 1715, the Commissioners agreed that the church would be constructed on the north to south alignment.

The land purchase was the work of Nicholas Hawksmoor, one of the two surveyors appointed by the commissioners of the 1711 act. Unlike others appointed by the commissioners, Hawksmoor continued to work as a surveyor of the 1711 act churches until his death in 1736. Of the 12 churches completed, he was responsible for designing six, of which St George's Bloomsbury was the last. His final designs for St George's, however, were only commissioned and then adopted after earlier designs by James Gibbs and Sir John Vanbrugh (who proposed building a church with the altar in the north) were rejected by the commissioners.

The stepped tower is influenced by Pliny the Elder's description of the Mausoleum at Halicarnassus, and topped with a statue of King George I in Roman dress. Its statues of fighting lions and unicorns symbolise the recent end of the First Jacobite Rising. The portico is based on that of the Temple of Bacchus in Baalbek, Lebanon.

The tower is depicted in William Hogarth's well-known engraving "Gin Lane" (1751) and by James Mayhew in the children's book Gaspard's Foxtrot (2021). Charles Dickens used St George's as the setting for "The Bloomsbury Christening" in Sketches by Boz.

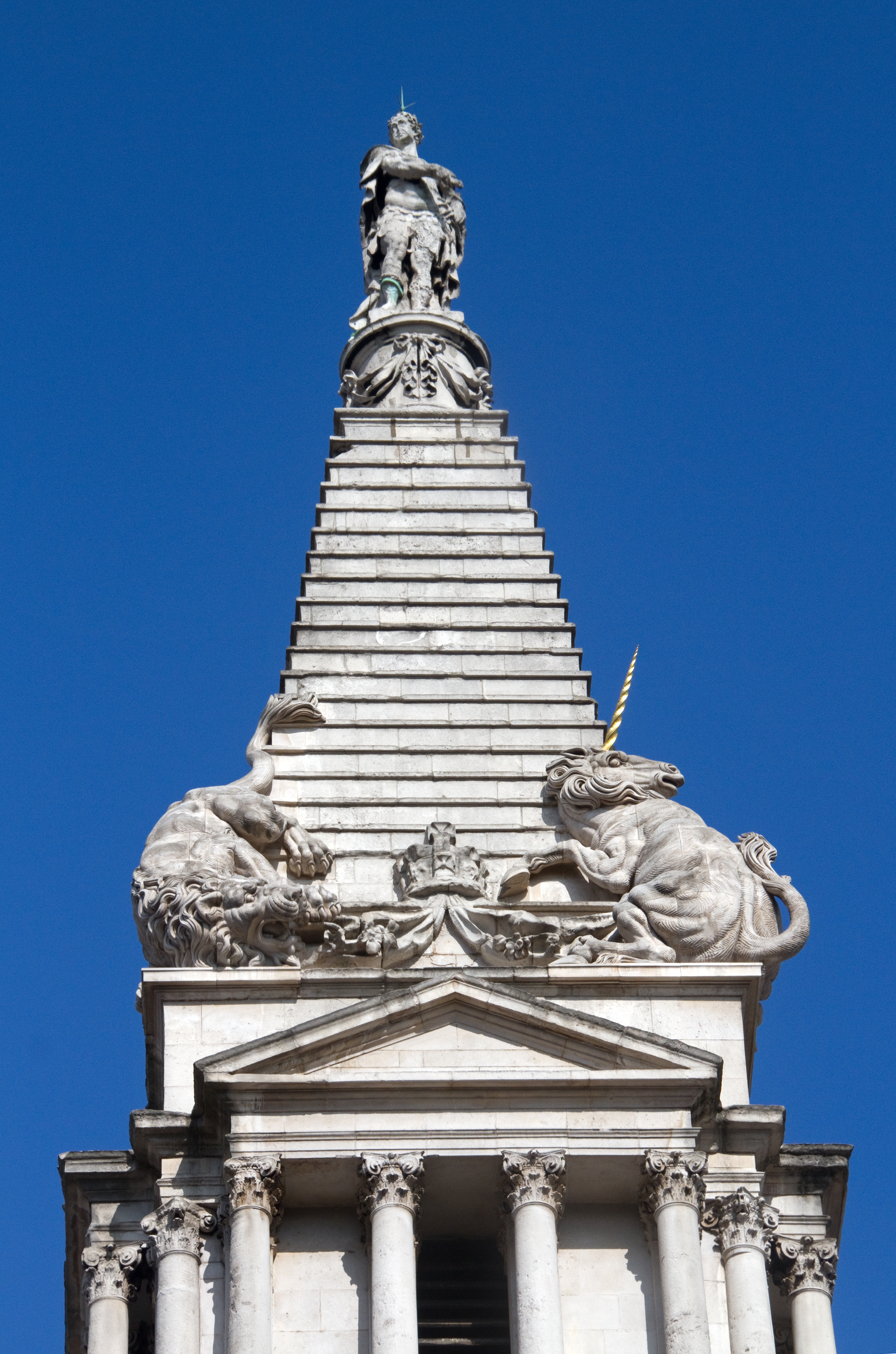
Detail of the tower

The statue of George I was humorously described in a rhyme:

When Henry VIII left the Pope in the lurch,
The Protestants made him the head of the church,
But George's good subjects, the Bloomsbury people
Instead of the church, made him head of the steeple.

— Horace Walpole

The church was designated a Grade I listed building on 24 October 1951.

== Opening times and services ==
The main service is held at 10:30am on Sunday morning. The church is open to visitors on request.

St George's runs educational workshops and lectures for schools, families and adults. It also hosts events and classes for the local community events (flower festivals, dance, choir classes).

== Location ==
St George's Bloomsbury is located on Bloomsbury Way, next door to the Bloomsbury Thistle Hotel.

== Hymn ==
A hymn used on St George's Day (written by Ursula Roberts, wife of the rector William Corbett Roberts) begins:

A maid in fetters wailing
Her sore and sorry plight
A foul and slimy dragon
A brave and glorious knight!
(chorus) Let lusty voices sing!
"St George for Merry England"
Triumphant echoes ring.

== Museum of Comedy ==
The crypt was renovated and used as an art gallery in the 1990s.

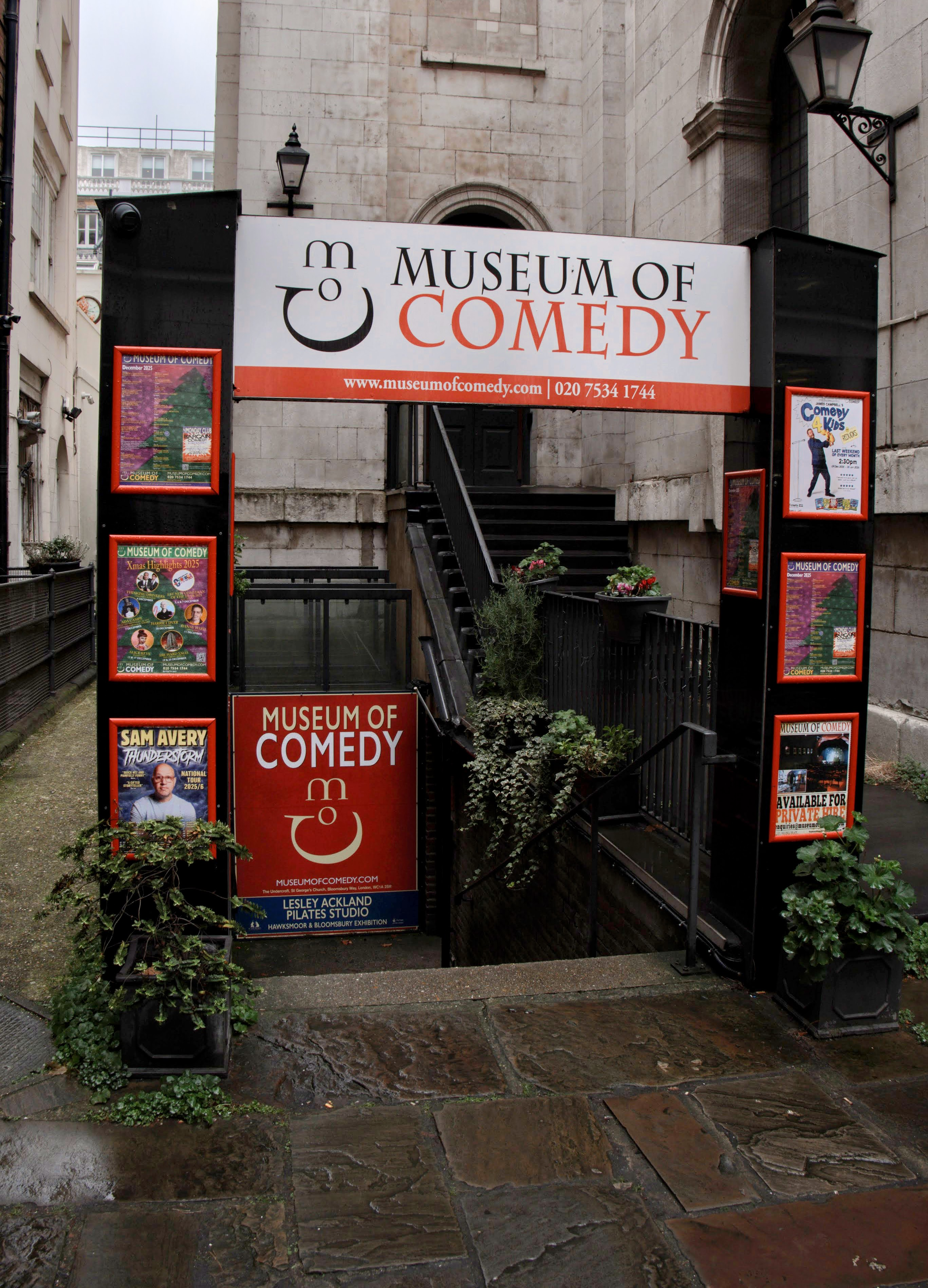
Museum of Comedy entrance

Since April 2014 it has housed the Museum of Comedy. The museum focuses on the history of British comedy and includes photos, posters, props, clothing and costumes, scripts, films and videos of British comedic performers and shows. There is also a 100-seat performance space.

== Gallery ==
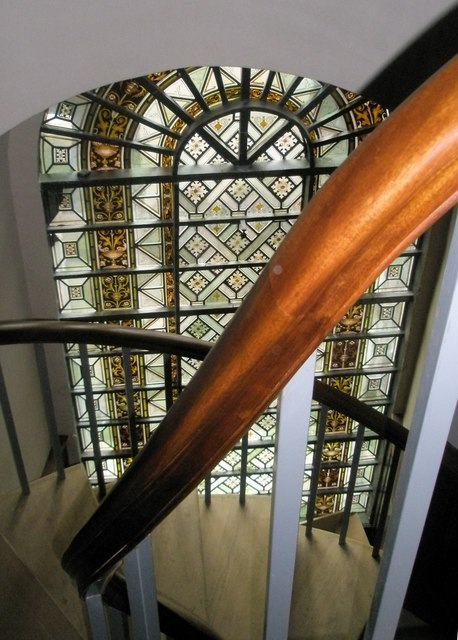
Spiral staircase inside the church

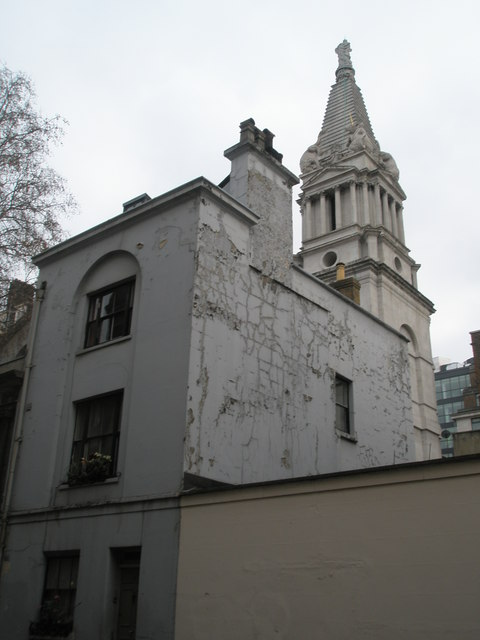
Rear of the church

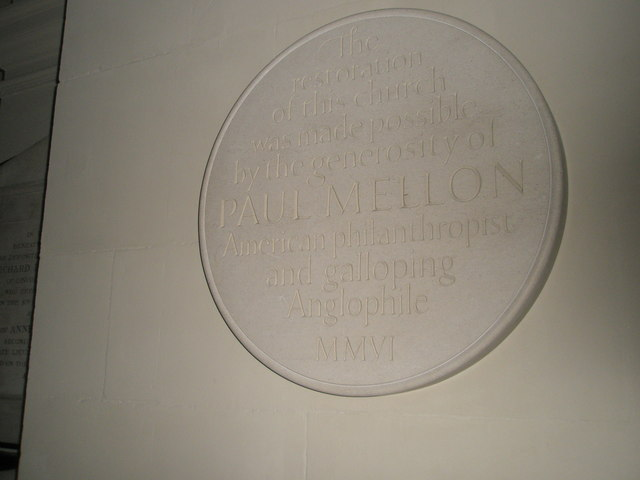
Plaque to Paul Mellon, "American philanthropist and galloping anglophile", in the church
