= British Hospital for Mothers and Babies =

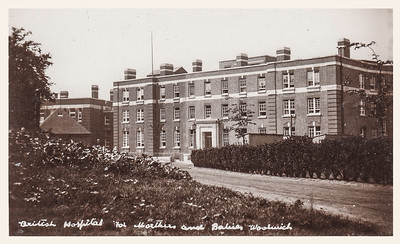
- British Hospital for Mothers and Babies

- Location within Greenwich

Geography
- Location: Woolwich, London, England, United Kingdom
- Coordinates: 51.49036°N 0.05012°E

Organisation
- Care system: NHS England

History
- Founded: 1905
- Closed: 1984

Links
- Lists: Hospitals in England

The British Hospital for Mothers and Babies (1905–1984) was a maternity hospital in south London.

== History ==
The Home for Mothers and Babies and Training School for District Midwives opened in May 1905, with the stated objectives of professionalising midwifery. The people behind it were three midwives: Alice Gregory; Lelia Parnell and Maud Cashmore. with the support of Charles Escreet, an Anglican priest. Its first location was in Wood Street, Woolwich, London. The facility opened with six beds but soon expanded to twelve, and in 1915 amalgamated with the British Lying-In Hospital, Holborn, central London. ("Lying-in" is a term for childbirth, even then old-fashioned and now archaic, referring to the long bedrest prescribed for new mothers in their postpartum confinement.)

In 1919 the hospital was given an award from King Edward's Hospital Fund of £1,500 toward building an amalgamated hospital. In 1922, the hospital's new buildings in Samuel Street, Woolwich were officially opened by Queen Mary.

During World War II the hospital was damaged in a bombing raid. Alice Gregory was still working at the hospital and she arranged for a new wing, which was opened by the Princess Royal in 1944. In addition, an evacuation hospital was set up in Brenchley, Kent, in a private house called Moatlands, purchased in 1944 for this purpose. In 1948 the Hospital came under the jurisdiction of the National Health Service and was placed under the jurisdiction of the Woolwich Group Hospital Management Committee. In 1953 Moatlands was vacated and the hospital's beds were transferred to Saint Nicholas Hospital, Plumstead. That hospital was closed in 1984.
