= Kroke =

Polish instrumental ensemble

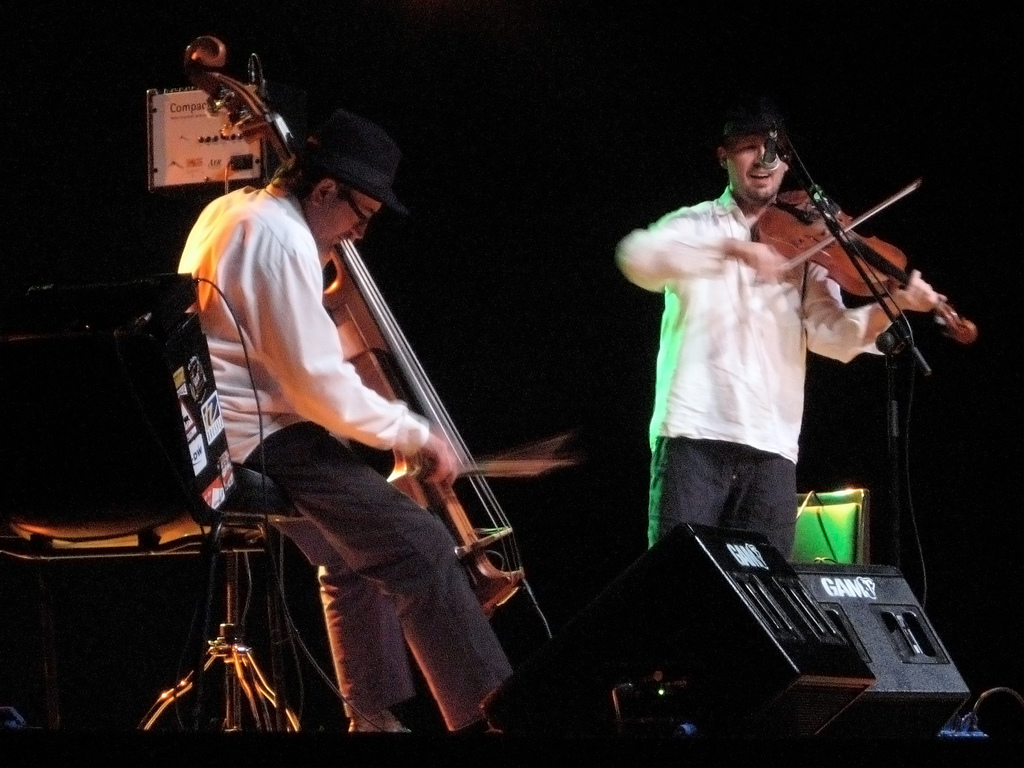
- Left to right: Tomasz Lato and Tomasz Kukurba during the concert in Mieres

Background information
- Origin: Kraków, Poland
- Genres: world music, Klezmer, Jewish music, folk, jazz, fusion
- Years active: 1992-present
- Labels: Oriente Musik, EMI Classics, NLD, Grelcom Studio, Artur Okularczyk, Radio Kraków Studio, Dub Master Studios, EMI Music Poland
- Members: Tomasz Lato; Tomasz Kukurba; Jerzy Bawoł
- Past members: Tomasz Grochot
- Website: kroke.pl

Kroke logo

Kroke is a Polish instrumental ensemble of world music. The band's name refers to the Yiddish language name for Kraków (קראקע, kroke).

The band was founded in 1992 by three friends and graduates of the Academy of Music in Kraków. Initially, they were associated with klezmer music with strong Balkan influences. Currently, their work draws inspiration from a variety of ethnic music and sounds of the Orient (especially on the album Seventh Trip), combining these with jazz to create their own distinctive style.

In addition to their own projects, Kroke have recorded albums with artists such as Nigel Kennedy, Edyta Geppert, and Urna.

One of their songs, "The Secret of the Life Tree", features on the soundtrack of David Lynch's 2006 film Inland Empire.

== History ==
The first official release from KROKE was the 1993 cassette “Klezmer Acoustic Music”. During a promotional concert for the album, the band met Steven Spielberg, who invited them to perform at the “Survivors Reunion” concert in Jerusalem, Israel and during the Polish premier of the film Schindler’s List.

In 1996, the band signed with the German record label Oriente Musik. The first album of material, released the same year, through this collaboration was Trio.

Upon the invitation of Peter Gabriel, KROKE made their first appearance at the WOMAD festival in July 1997. As a result, joint recording sessions at Real World Studios with other musicians led to material from the band being subsequently used by Peter Gabriel on his album Long Walk Home- music from the Rabbit-Proof Fence, the soundtrack to the film of the same name. In the same year, KROKE released their second full-length album – Eden.

The following years saw the band constantly touring, during which time they participated in such music festivals as: Umea Folk Music Festival (Sweden); City of London Festival (UK); Førde Folk Music Festival (Norway); North Sea Jazz Festival (the Netherlands) as well as many others. During this time, the albums Live at the Pit (1998 – nominated for the German Record Critics’ Award -Preis der Deutschen Schallplattenkritik in 1999) and The Sounds of the Vanishing Wold (1999 – winner of the German Record Critics’ Award in 2000) were released.

In 2001, KROKE began collaborating with Nigel Kennedy, the result of which was the album East Meets East, released in 2003. During the same year, the band released Ten Pieces to Save the World as a trio. This album went on to rank number two in the World Music Charts Europe.

Along with Nigel Kennedy, the band once again performed at the WOMAD festival in 2004. The same year, KROKE received a nomination in the World Music category from BBC Radio 3 for the album Quartet – Live at Home (with Tomasz Grochot on drums, who went on to tour with the band over the next few years) as well as working with Edyta Geppert, which would later bring about the joint release Śpiewam życie (2006). At the same time, a project was begun with the Sinfonia Baltica orchestra, entitled “KROKE – symfonicznie”, conducted and arranged by Bohdan Jarmołowicz.

In 2006, KROKE's song “The Secret of the Life Tree” appeared on the soundtrack to David Lynch's film Inland Empire.

Another original album entitled Seventh Trip was released in 2007.

2008 was filled with concerts in Poland and throughout Europe as well as work on an "intimate project” arranged by Krzysztof Herdzin, which premiered in Spain with the Sinfonica de Burgos orchestra conducted by Javier Castro. Performances of this project played in Kraków and St. Petersburg in Russia with the accompaniment of Sinfonietta Cracovia conducted by Robert Kabara.

Released in 2009, the album Out of Sight was a kind of return to roots for the band. The musicians returned to working as a trio and their concerts took on a more intimate nature.

In 2010, they began work on a collection of Greek songs with Maja Sikorowska as well as performing concerts together with the Norwegian band Tindra and Spanish violinist Diego Galaz. Other special events that year included the recording of music for the film Streetcar Memories, directed by Łukasz Czuj (the film played at the opening of the Schindler Factory Museum in Kraków), and participation in the Kennedy's Polish Weekend at the Southbank Centre in London alongside Nigel Kennedy. In the same year, KROKE performed at the Schleswig-Holstein Musik Festival in Germany and took part in the concert “Your Angel's Name is Liberty”, directed by Robert Wilson, on occasion of the 30th anniversary of Solidarity in Gdańsk.

In January 2011, the collaboration album Śpiewam Życie with Edyta Geppert was certified “gold”. That same month, KROKE along with Maja Sikorowska completed work on the album Avra, which contains 12 Greek songs. This project also involved guest percussionist Sławomir Berny.

In the same year Kroke & Tindra released album Live in Førde - the recordings were made in the auditorium at Førdehuset on July 10, 2010 for NRK's radio P2.

=== Group members ===
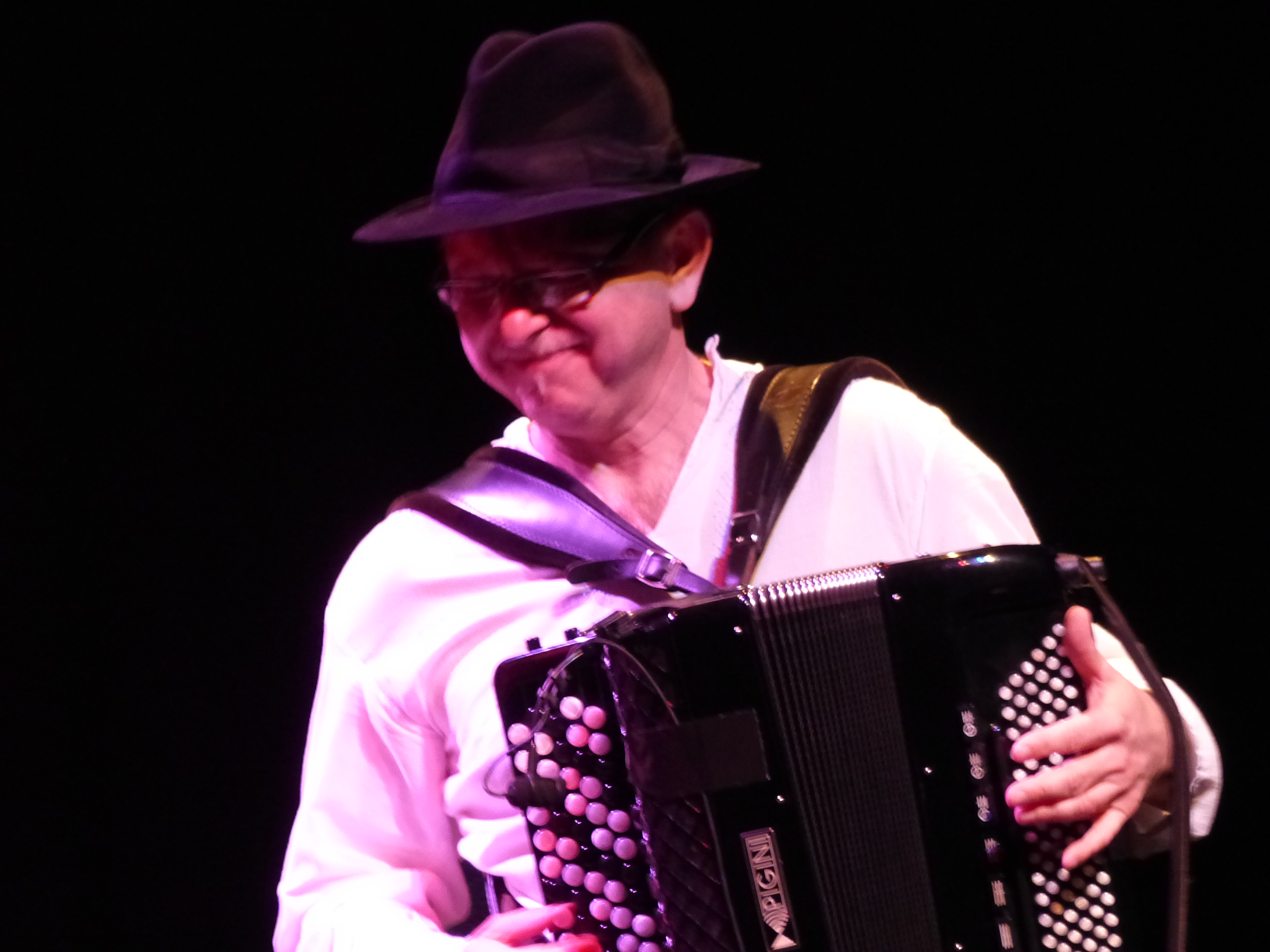
Jerzy Bawoł

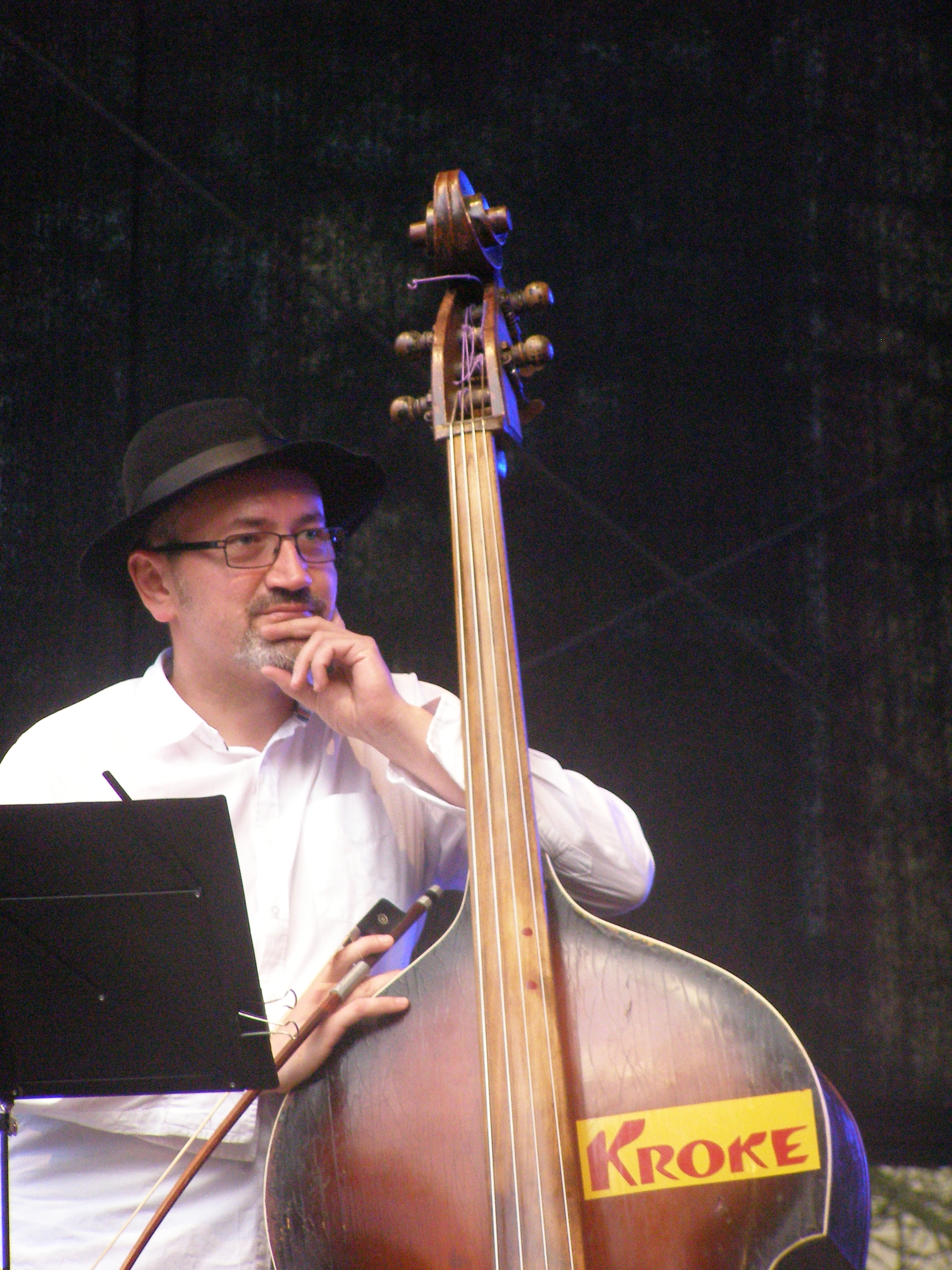
Tomasz Lato

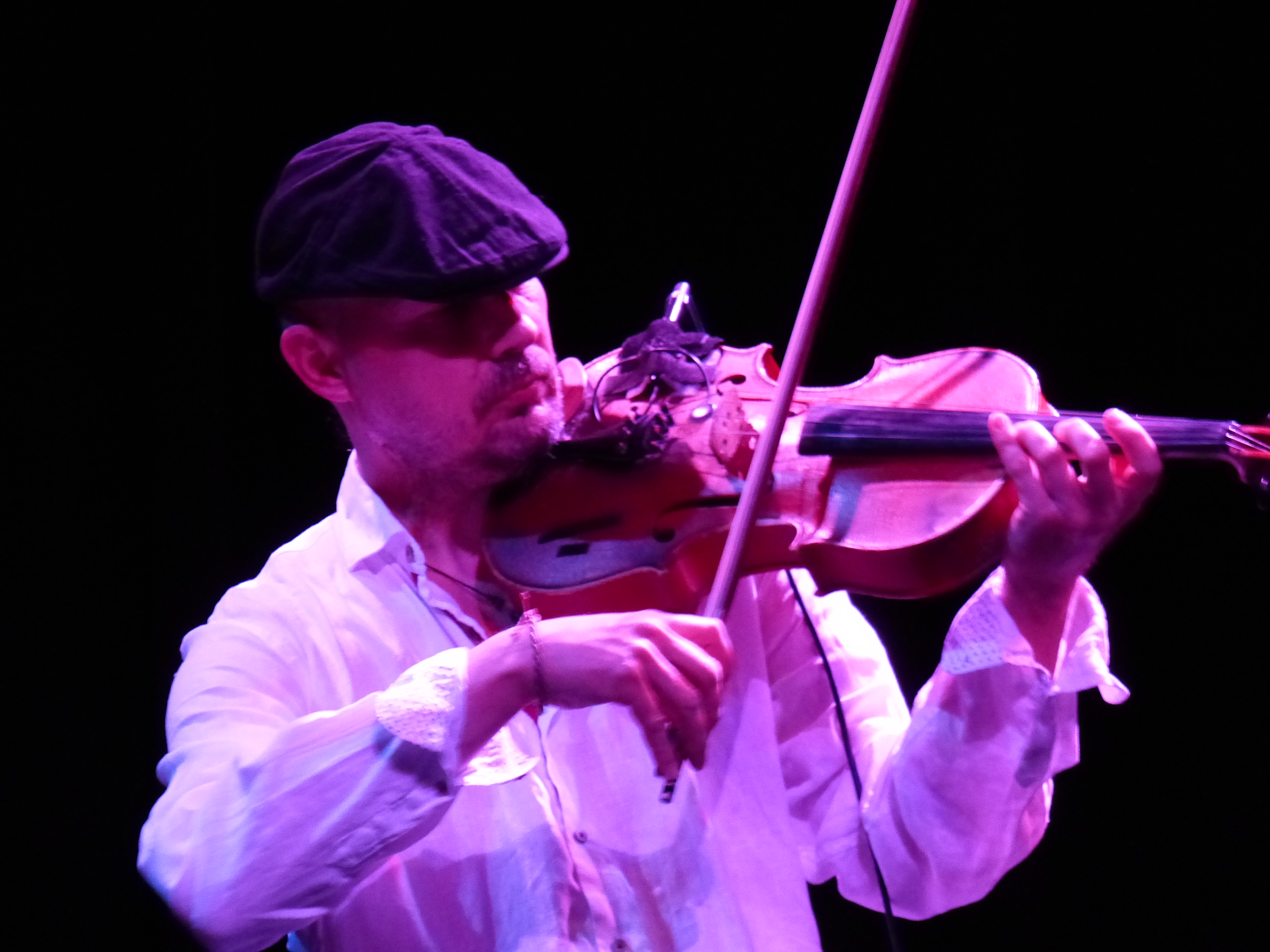
Tomasz Kukurba

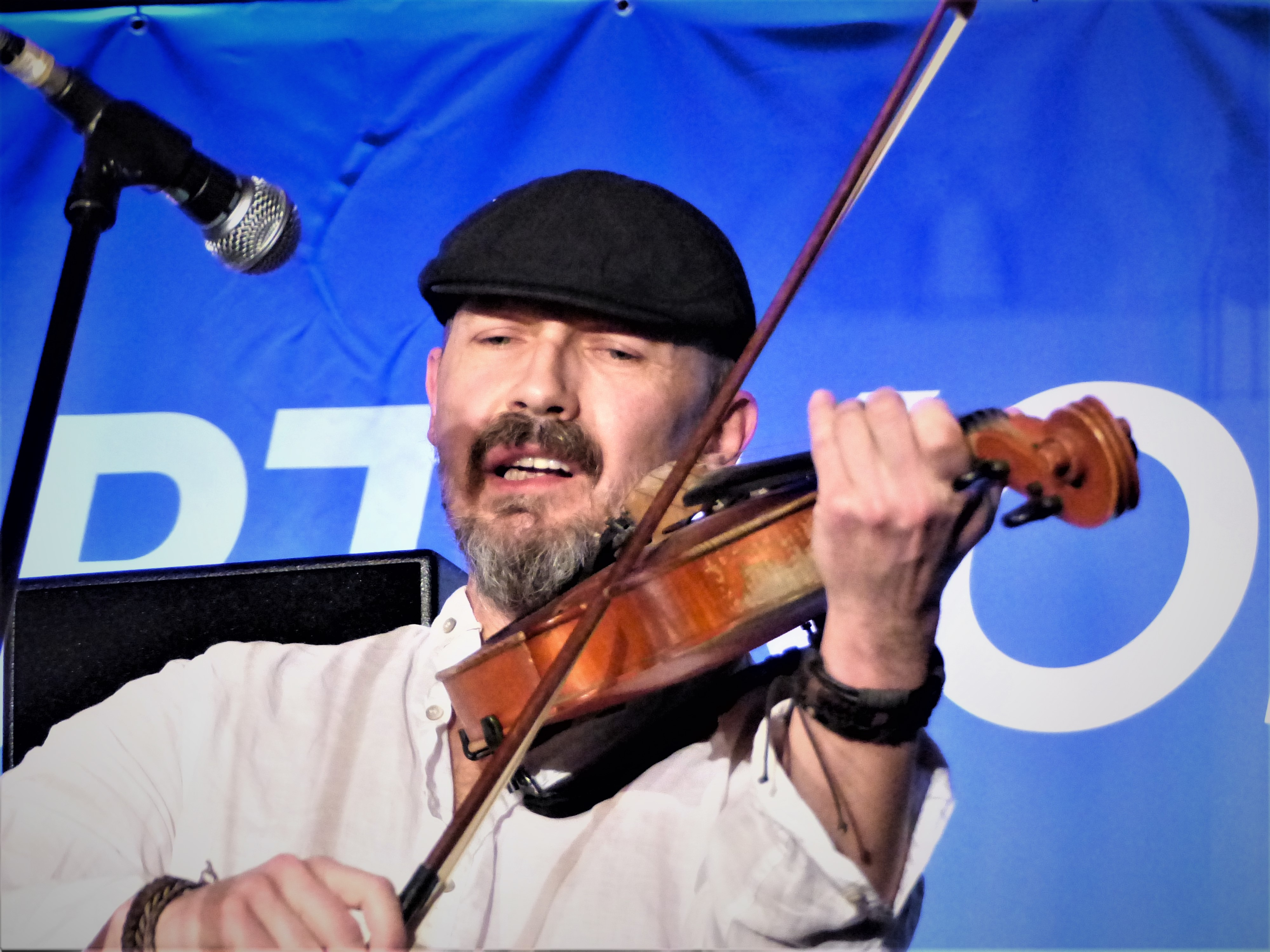
Tomasz Kukurba

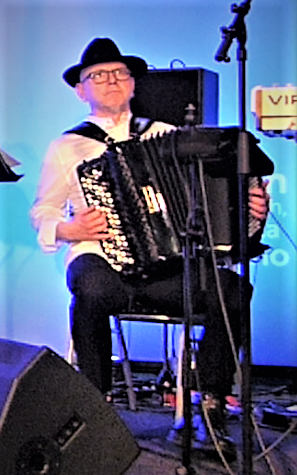
Jerzy Bawoł

== Discography ==
=== Studio albums ===
Title	Album details	Peak chart positions	Certifications
Title	Album details	POL	Certifications
Klezmer Acoustic Music	Released: 1993; Label: Self-released; Formats: CS	—	
Trio Klezmer Acoustic Music	Released: 1995; Label: AMC; Formats: CS	—	
Trio	Released: October 2, 1996; Label: Oriente Musik; Formats: CD, digital download	—	
Eden	Released: September 19, 1997; Label: Oriente Musik; Formats: CD, digital download	—	
The Sounds of the Vanishing World	Released: December 1, 1999; Label: Oriente Musik; Formats: CD, digital download	—	
Ten Pieces to Save the World	Released: February 10, 2003; Label: Oriente Musik; Formats: CD, digital download	—	
Seventh Trip	Released: May 7, 2007; Label: Oriente Musik; Formats: CD, digital download	—	
Out of Sight	Released: October 1, 2009; Label: Oriente Musik; Formats: CD, digital download	22	POL: Gold
Feelharmony	Released: October 9, 2012; Label: EMI Music Poland; Formats: CD, digital download	—	
Ten	Released: 2014; Label: Oriente Musik; Formats: CD, digital download	—	
Cabaret of Death: Music for a Film	Released: October 2015; Label: Oriente Musik; Formats: CD, digital download	—	
Traveller	Released: March 17, 2017; Label: Universal Music Group; Formats: CD, digital download	—	
"—" denotes a recording that did not chart or was not released in that territory.

=== Live albums ===
Title	Album details
Live at the Pit	Released: October 20, 1998; Label: Oriente Musik; Formats: CD
Quartet: Live at Home	Released: September 20, 2004; Label: Oriente Musik; Formats: CD, digital download

=== Collaborative albums ===
Title	Album details	Peak chart positions	Certifications
Title	Album details	POL	Certifications
East Meets East (with Nigel Kennedy)	Released: June 6, 2003; Label: EMI Music Poland; Formats: CD, digital download	6	POL: Gold
Śpiewam życie (with Edyta Geppert)	Released: October 2, 2006; Label: Agencja Artystyczna Edyta/EMI; Formats: CD, digital download	11	POL: Gold
Avra (with Maja Sikorowska)	Released: February 28, 2011; Label: EMI Music Poland; Formats: CD	15	
Live in Førde (with Tindra)	Released: September 12, 2011; Label: Talik; Formats: CD, digital download	—	
Ser (with Urna)	Released: 2018; Label: Formats: CD, digital download	—	
"—" denotes a recording that did not chart or was not released in that territory.

== See also ==
- Culture of Kraków
