= Church League for Women's Suffrage =

UK organization

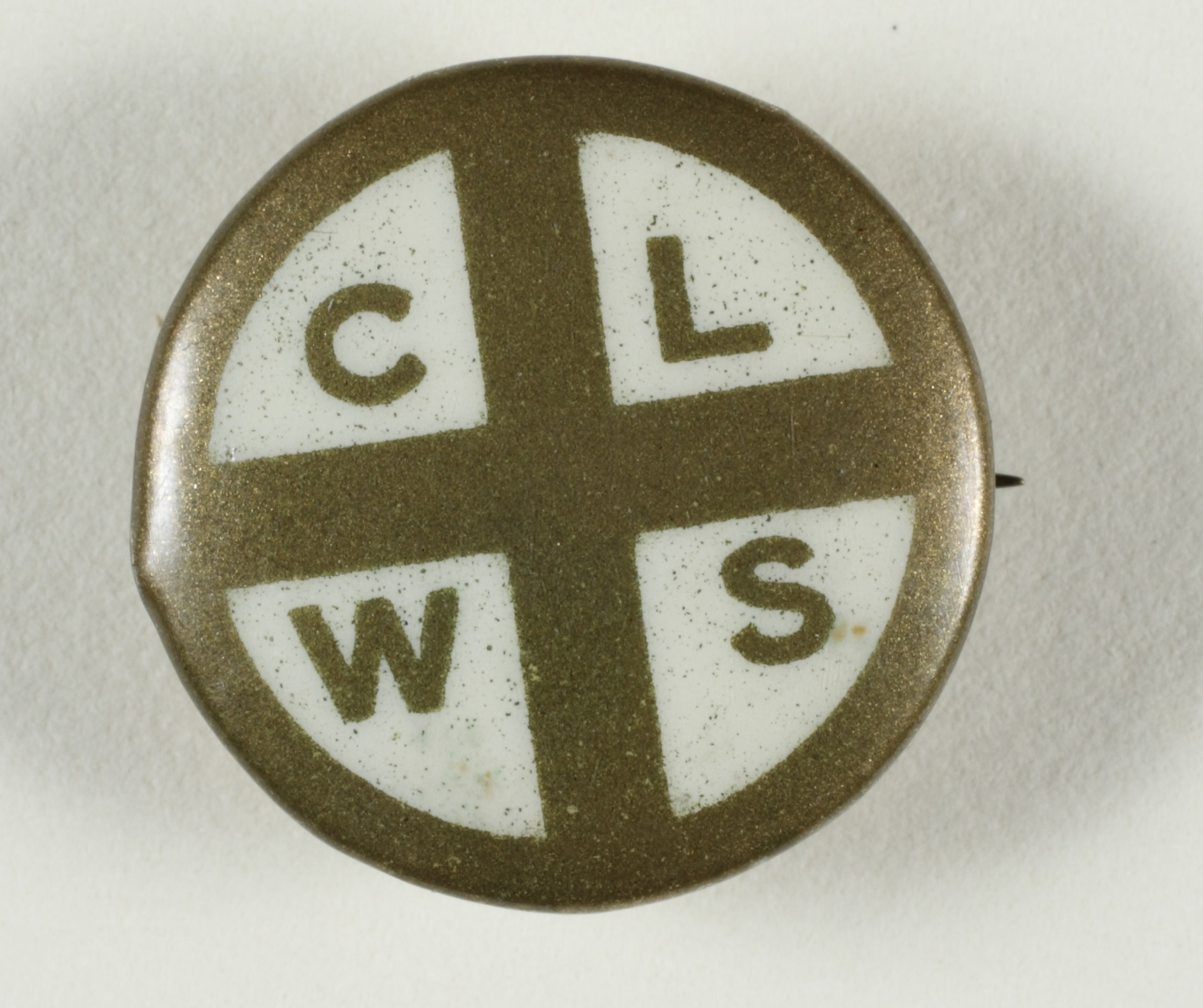
CLWS badge

The Church League for Women's Suffrage (CLWS) was an organisation campaigning for women's suffrage in the United Kingdom. The league was started in London, but by 1913 it had branches across England, in Wales and Scotland and Ireland.

== Aims and achievements ==
This organisation aimed to 'Secure the Vote in Church and State as it is, or may be granted to men'. It was over a century later that females were permitted to be ordained as bishops within the Church of England. The Church League in 1914 allowed individuals to participate in other movements for the cause of women's equality but their own organisation's 'only methods.. are those of Prayer and Education". A benefit of the League was to refute the charge that the Church was indifferent to the matter of women's right to vote.

The first woman to preach in a Church of Ireland church, which was done with the approval of the Archbishop of Dublin and the church's governors, was Edith Picton-Turbervill. She was speaking in Ireland under the auspices of the CLWS.

== Notable members ==
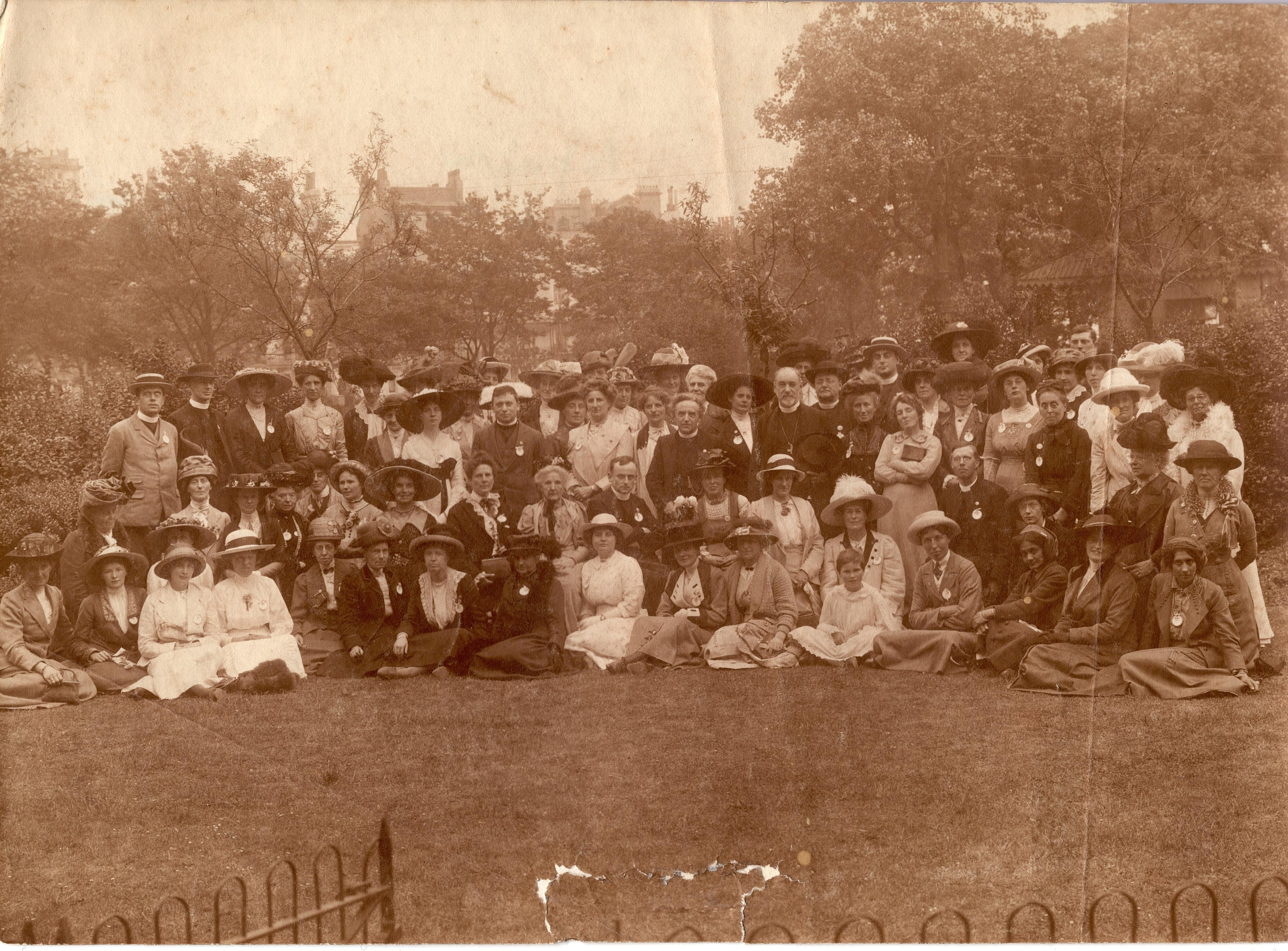
CLWS meeting in Brighton in 1913 by Muriel Darton, a photographer who worked pro bono for suffrage causes. Florence Canning is the lady without a hat in the centre within a ring of clergy.

The League was founded by the Reverend Claude Hinscliff in 1909, who was its secretary for a long time. Other founding members included Margaret Nevinson and Olive Wharry, and Joan Cather, whose husband Lt. John Leonard Cather was chair of its finance committee.

Notable members included Ellen Oliver, Frances Balfour and Louise Creighton and the more militant Muriel Matters, Florence Canning, Jessie Landale Cumberland, Maude Royden, Lady Constance Lytton, Fanny J Pease and Katherine Harley. Emily Wilding Davison, who died under the King's horse at Epsom, was a member, and her funeral was held at St George's, Bloomsbury, led by its vicar, Charles Baumgarten (also a member of the League), Claude Hinscliff, and Charles Escreet, Archdeacon of Lewisham. The doctor, Letitia Fairfield, was also a member and talks about the work of the League in 2 interviews with the historian, Brian Harrison, conducted as part of the Suffrage Interviews project, titled Oral evidence on the suffragette and suffragist movements: the Brian Harrison interviews.

The Irish Church had resisted the League because it refused to denounce the behaviour of militant suffragettes. By 1913 Florence Canning led the executive committee and she was one of six of the thirteen members identified for their militancy.

== The League of the Church Militant ==
After the end of World War I, and the passage of the Representation of the People Act 1918, which gave votes to many but not all women, the League decided to re-focus its efforts. In 1919 it renamed itself The League of the Church Militant. It continued to lobby to extend the franchise to achieve equality with men (Representation of the People (Equal Franchise) Act 1928), and a range of other theologically liberal causes It also focussed its efforts on the ordination of women. However, its suffrage associations limited its work, and it dissolved shortly before the 1930 Lambeth Conference, a gathering of Anglican Communion bishops from around the world. It was replaced by the Anglican Group for the Ordination of Women to the Historic Ministry (1930-1978).

== See also ==
- List of suffragists and suffragettes § Major suffrage organizations
- List of women's organizations
- List of women's rights activists
- Timeline of women's suffrage
- Churches Militant, Penitent, and Triumphant - the phrase "the church militant" refers to Christians on earth, those serving others and working for a better world

== Bibliography ==
White, Susan J. (2014). "'The Church Militant': A. Maude Royden and the Quest for Women's Equality in the Inter-War Years". In Bailey, Warner M.; Barrett, Lee C. III; Duke, James O. (eds.). The Theologically Formed Heart: Essays in Honor of David J. Gouwens. Eugene, Oregon: Pickwick Publications. pp. 47–71. ISBN 978-1-62564-191-5.
