= Recital (Nigel Kennedy album) =

Studio album by Nigel Kennedy
- Released: 2013
- Genre: Jazz
- Label: Sony Classical
- Producer: Nigel Kennedy

Nigel Kennedy chronology
The Four Elements (2011)	Recital (2013)	My World (2016)

Recital is a 2013 jazz album by Nigel Kennedy and the Orchestra of Life for Sony Classical.

== Track listing ==
1. Sweet & Slow (Fats Waller)
2. "Take Five" (Dave Brubeck)
3. I'm Crazy About My Baby (Fats Waller)
4. Por do sol (Ze Gomez)
5. Viper's Drag (Fats Waller)
6. New Dawn (Nigel Kennedy)
7. Out of the Ocean (Irish Traditional / Nigel Kennedy)
8. How Can You Face Me Now (Fats Waller)
9. Allegro - inspired by Bach (Bach / Kennedy)
10. Vivace - inspired by Bach (Bach / Kennedy)
11. Helena's Honeysuckle (Yaron Stavi)
12. Dusk (Nigel Kennedy)
