= Susan Miles =

British author

Susan Miles was the pen name of Ursula Wyllie Roberts (1887–1975).

== Biography ==
She was born at Meerut in India, where her father was in the British army. He was Lieutenant-Colonel Robert John Humphrey Wyllie and her mother was Emily Titcomb.

Under her own name, she wrote a pamphlet The Cause of Purity and Women's Suffrage which was published by the Church League for Women's Suffrage in 1912.

As Susan Miles, she published several slim volumes of poetry: Dunch (1918), Annotations (1922), Little Mirrors (1923?), The Hares (1924), News! News! (1943?), Rainbows (1962), A Morsel of Gold (1962) and Epigrams and Jingles (1962) as well as the more famous novel in verse Lettice Delmer (1958, reprinted by Persephone Books in 2002), two other novels (Blind Men Crossing a Bridge (1934) and Rabboni (1942)) and a biography of her husband, Rev. William Corbett Roberts, Portrait of a Parson (1955). Dunch was sufficiently significant to earn her a reasonably positive mention in Harold Monro's often unforgiving Some Contemporary Poets (1920) and Herbert Palmer described her as "One [of] the most original" in the chapter on Women Poets in his 1938 study of post-Victorian poetry. She also edited Childhood in Verse and Prose (1923) and An Anthology of Youth in Verse and Prose (1925).
