= Claude Hinscliff =

British suffragist (1875–1964)

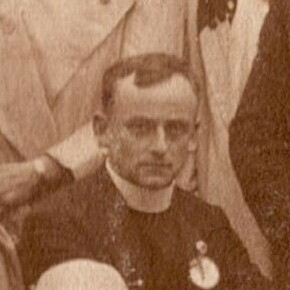
Claude Hinscliff (1913)

Reverend Claude Hinscliff (1875–1964) was a British suffragist. He was a leading member of the Church League for Women's Suffrage.

== Education and early career ==
Hinscliff matriculated at Durham University in 1893 to study for a licentiate in theology, and was awarded a scholarship following his performance in the entrance examination. A member of Hatfield Hall, he also coxed for the university boat club and graduated in 1896.

He was ordained deacon in the Diocese of Norwich in 1897 and served at Parham and Hacheston in Suffolk. In December 1899, he was ordained priest at St George in the Meadows, Nottingham. By 1905, he was vicar of Bobbing in Kent.

== Involvement with women's suffrage ==
Hinscliff founded the Church League for Women's Suffrage, an Anglican organisation supporting women's suffrage, in 1909 and served for several years as its secretary. In June 1913, he participated in the funeral service of suffragette Emily Davison at St George's, Bloomsbury, alongside the church's vicar, Charles Baumgarten.

By 1913, Hinscliff had become increasingly opposed to suffragette militancy, particularly arson attacks against churches, and the Church League consequently began to distance itself from the Women's Social and Political Union (WSPU). Having been diagnosed with myocarditis in 1911, he resigned as the league's honorary organiser in 1914 on medical advice.

Hinscliff is among the 59 supporters of women's suffrage whose names and portraits appear on the plinth of the statue of Millicent Fawcett in Parliament Square, London, unveiled in 2018.

== Later life ==
Hinscliff later worked in Europe. In 1920, he served on the staff of the Serbian Relief Fund, and by March 1921 was British chaplain in Belgrade. He subsequently moved to Romania, serving as British chaplain in Bucharest from 1921 to 1924.
