= Nigel Kennedy =

English musician (born 1956)

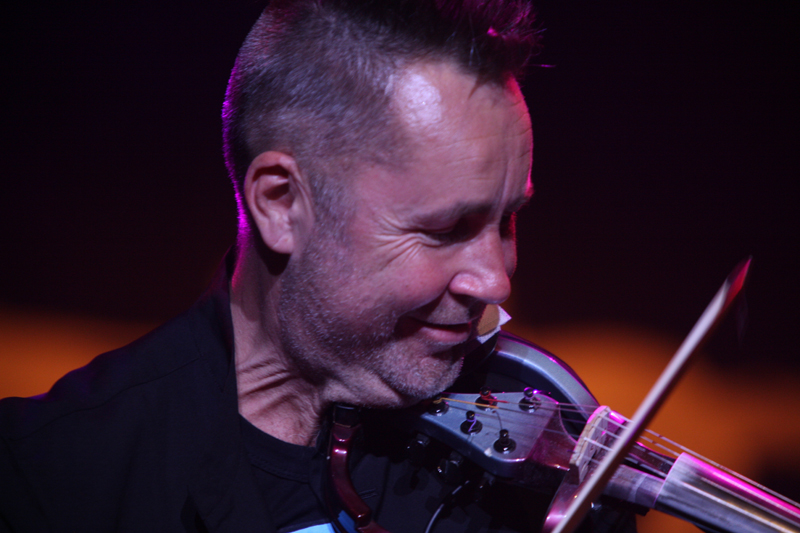
- Kennedy performing in 2010

Background information
- Born: 28 December 1956 (age 69); Brighton, Sussex, England
- Genres: Classical; pop; rock; jazz; klezmer
- Occupations: Musician; composer
- Instruments: Violin; viola; piano
- Years active: 1984–present
- Label: EMI Classics

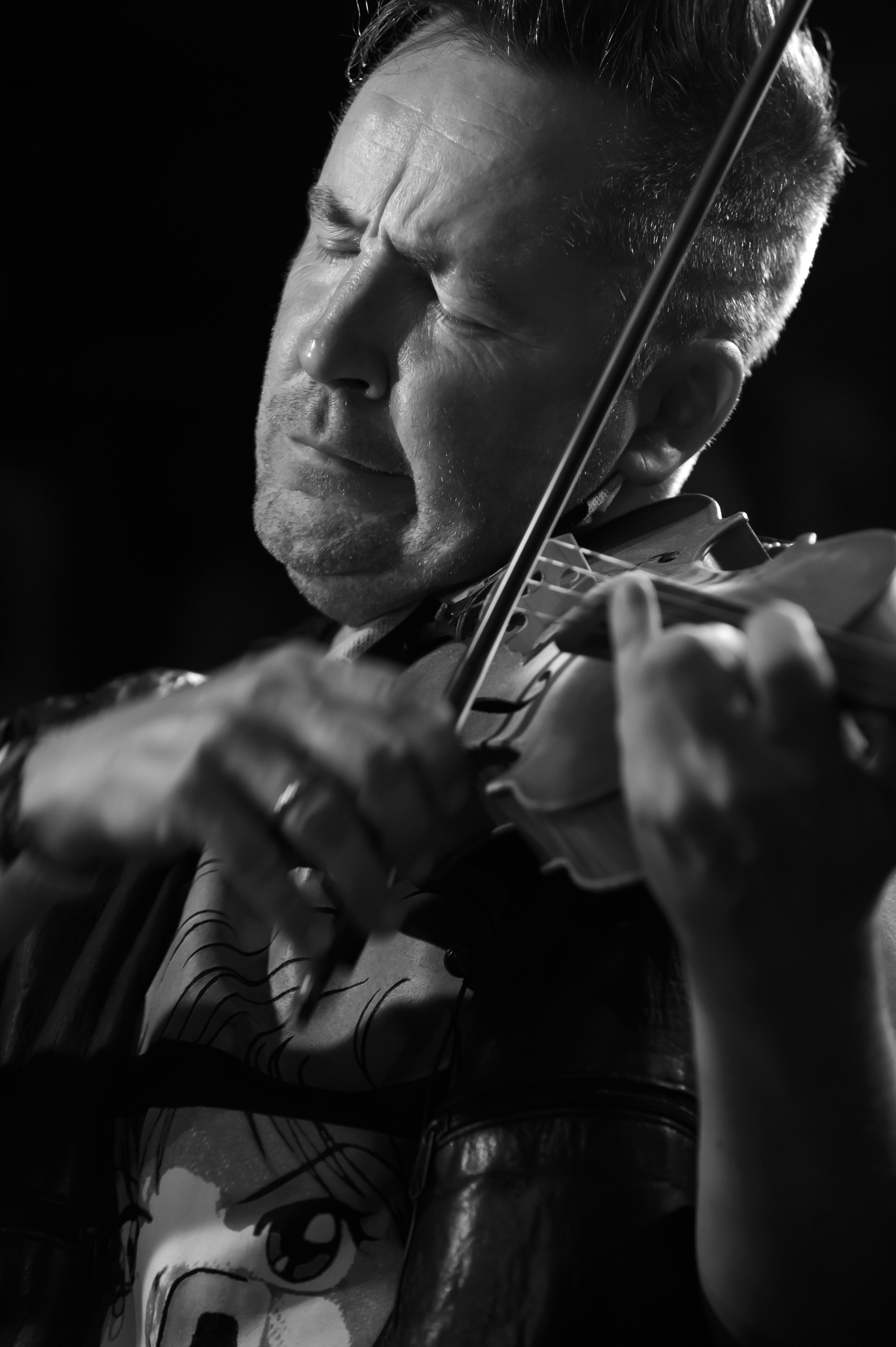
Nigel Kennedy Szczawnica – Jaworki, Poland

Nigel Kennedy (born 28 December 1956) is an English musician and composer. He plays the violin, viola and piano. His early career was primarily spent performing classical music, and has since expanded into jazz, klezmer, and other genres.

== Early life and background ==
Kennedy's grandfather was Lauri Kennedy, principal cellist with the BBC Symphony Orchestra, and his grandmother was Dorothy Kennedy, a pianist. Lauri and Dorothy Kennedy were Australian, while their son, the cellist John Kennedy, was born in England. After graduating from the Royal Academy of Music in London, at age 22, Nigel's father John joined the Royal Liverpool Philharmonic Orchestra, later becoming the principal cellist of Sir Thomas Beecham's Royal Philharmonic Orchestra. While in England, John developed a relationship with an English pianist, Scylla Stoner, with whom he toured in 1952 as part of the Llewellyn-Kennedy Piano Trio, with the violinist Ernest Llewellyn; Stoner was billed as "Scylla Kennedy" after she and John married. After they divorced John returned to Australia.

Nigel Kennedy was born in Brighton. A child prodigy, at age 10 he picked out Fats Waller tunes on the piano after hearing his stepfather's jazz records. At the age of 7, he became a pupil at the Yehudi Menuhin School of Music. He later studied at the Juilliard School in New York City with Dorothy DeLay. While there he helped to pay for his studies by busking with fellow student and cellist Thomas Demenga.

== Musical career ==
=== Until 2000 ===
At the age of 16, Kennedy was invited by jazz violinist Stéphane Grappelli to appear with him at New York's Carnegie Hall. He made his recording debut in 1984 with Elgar's Violin Concerto. His subsequent recording of Vivaldi's The Four Seasons with the English Chamber Orchestra in 1989 sold over two million copies and earned a place as one of the best-selling of all classical recordings. The album remained at the top of the UK classical charts for over a year, with total sales of over three million units.

In 1992, Kennedy announced the end of his career in classical music. Around this time, he recorded the album Music in Colours with Stephen Duffy. He returned to the international concert platform in the mid-1990s. In 1997, he received an award for Outstanding Contribution to British Music at the BRIT Awards, and in 2001 received the 'Male Artist of the Year' award.

In other music genres, in 1993, Kennedy made an appearance on Robert Plant's solo album Fate of Nations on the track "Calling to you". In that same year, Kennedy recorded a cover of Jimi Hendrix's "Fire" for the album Stone Free: A Tribute to Jimi Hendrix. In 1999, Sony Classical released The Kennedy Experience, which featured improvisational recordings based on six songs by Hendrix: "Third Stone from the Sun ", "Little Wing", "1983... (A Merman I Should Turn to Be)", "Drifting", "Fire" and "Purple Haze".

Kennedy's first autobiography, Always Playing, was published in 1991. His second, Nigel Kennedy Uncensored!, came out in 2021.

=== Since 2000 ===
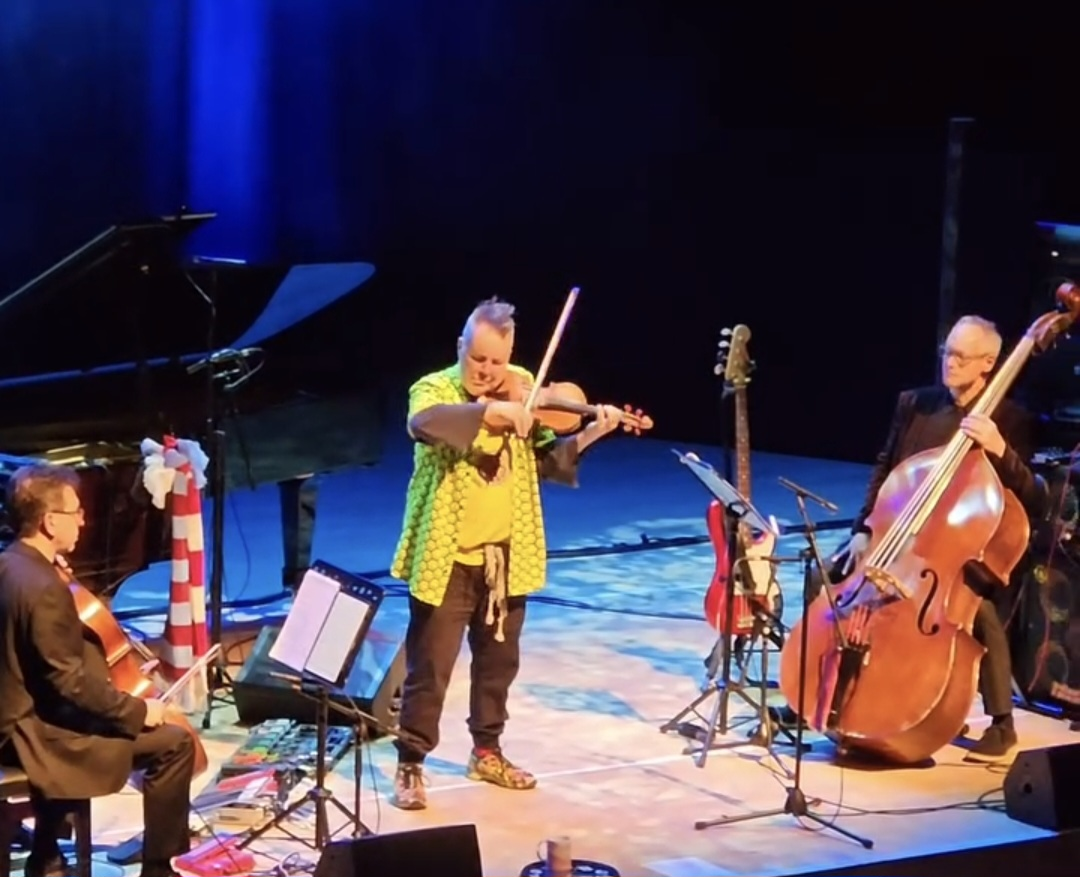
Nigel Kennedy performing 2026 in Basingstoke

In 2000, Kennedy recorded, with Jaz Coleman, Riders on the Storm: The Doors Concerto, a violin-based orchestral version of songs by The Doors, including "Strange Days", "L.A. Woman", "The End", and "Riders on the Storm".

On 27 November 2000, Kennedy joined The Who at the Royal Albert Hall to play the violin solo in the song "Baba O'Riley"; this was released three years later on the album Live at the Royal Albert Hall.

Kennedy also played on several tracks – including "Experiment IV" – by British singer-songwriter Kate Bush, who was a guest on Kennedy's episode of This Is Your Life. He was featured on two of Sarah Brightman's songs for her 2003 album Harem.

Kennedy explored klezmer music with the Polish jazz band Kroke.

In late 2005, Kennedy recorded his first album for the Blue Note jazz label, released as Blue Note Sessions, with Ron Carter on double bass, Jack DeJohnette on drums and saxophonist Joe Lovano.

Kennedy returned to the 2008 Proms after an absence of 21 years, performing Elgar's Violin Concerto and a late-night Prom with the Nigel Kennedy Quintet. He was appointed artistic director of the Polish Chamber Orchestra and in 2010, founded the Orchestra of Life, an ensemble of mainly Polish musicians.

In August 2013, Kennedy again returned to the Proms performing The Four Seasons at a concert featuring Kennedy with a group of young Palestinian musicians, the Palestine Strings from the Edward Said Conservatory of Music, and the Orchestra of Life. According to Michael Church of The Independent, in the first movement "Spring", Kennedy "swerved off-course with a flurry of bird-tweets followed by a jazz riff from his bassist; the staccato chords of the next movement were decorated by a microtonal Arabic riff from one of the guest players". Near the end of the concert, the BBC removed the violinist's attribution of apartheid to Israel from the television broadcast on BBC4. The comments were broadcast live on BBC Radio 3. A representative of the Corporation said they did not "fall within the editorial remit of the Proms as a classical music festival." Kennedy said:

Ladies and gentlemen, it's a bit facile to say it but we all know from experiencing this night of music tonight, that given equality, and getting rid of apartheid, gives a beautiful chance for amazing things to happen.

Kennedy objected to the removal of his remarks from the broadcast. A condition of the booking, to which Kennedy had agreed, was not making such a comment, according to his manager.

Kennedy also plays the viola, and has recorded Sir William Walton's Viola Concerto. Kennedy's own compositions include incidental music for Chekhov's play Three Sisters.

In 2026, Kennedy performed on tour in the UK for the first time in nearly 15 years. The tour included 31 dates, in towns including Crawley, Guildford, Chatham, as well as the King's Theatre in Southsea and The Anvil in Basingstoke.

=== Image ===
In 1991, the Controller of BBC Radio 3, John Drummond, criticised Kennedy describing him as "a Liberace for the nineties" and objected to his "ludicrous" clothes and "self-invented accent".

Until 2006, Kennedy expressed his intention of not appearing on the classical London concert scene with a London orchestra, which was seen by some as arrogance, although he rationalised it in terms of frustrated perfectionism:

It all comes down to the amount of rehearsal you get, or don't get, in this country. I insist on three or four sessions prior to a concert, and orchestral administrators won't accommodate that. If I didn't care about getting it right, I could do three concerts in the same amount of time and earn three times the money. But you can't do something properly in less time than it takes.

Kennedy expresses a preference for the immediate appeal of live performance, and often records entire works or movements in single takes to preserve this sense in his recordings. He also introduces improvised elements to his performances, as in his Jimi Hendrix-inspired cadenza to Beethoven's Violin Concerto and his jazz and fusion recordings.

In September 2021, Kennedy cancelled a performance at the Royal Albert Hall after the host, Classic FM, prevented him from including a Jimi Hendrix composition at the concert. He had intended to perform a version of "Little Wing" in the manner of Ralph Vaughan Williams

== Personal life and politics ==
Kennedy was romantically involved with singer/guitarist Brix Smith after she had broken up from and divorced husband Mark E. Smith in 1989.

Kennedy currently divides his time among residences in Malvern, Worcestershire where his former girlfriend Eve Westmore and son live, London and Kraków, Poland. He has been married twice; his second wife, Agnieszka (née Chowaniec), is a Polish actress and artistic director, born in April 1977.

Kennedy acknowledges regularly smoking cannabis to aid his creativity.

=== Football ===
Kennedy is an Aston Villa F.C. supporter. At Przystanek Woodstock 2010, he had his orchestra wear Aston Villa shirts and led the crowd in the team's chants. While living and recording in Poland, he also took an active interest in KS Cracovia, in whose 100th anniversary club replica kit he appeared.

=== Politics ===
Kennedy is an avowed socialist. He supported David Davis's campaign when he quit his Shadow Home Secretary post to force a by-election, in protest over proposals to allow terrorist suspects to be locked up for 42 days without charge. Kennedy is a vocal opponent of Israel's policies in the West Bank, and, in the summer of 2007, he told a Haaretz reporter:

I was shocked to see these walls, it's a new apartheid, barbaric behaviour: How can you impose such a collective punishment and separate people? After all, we are all living on the same planet. It seems to me the world should have already learned from what happened in South Africa. And a country that hasn't learned should be boycotted, so that's why I don't perform in your country.

=== Honours ===
In 1991, Kennedy was awarded an honorary degree (Doctor of Letters, or Litt.D.) by the University of Bath.

== Discography ==
List of albums, with selected chart positions and notes
Album	Year	Peak chart positions					Notes
Album	Year	UK	AUS	FRA	NLD	NZ	Notes
Strad Jazz (Chandos)	1984	—	—	—	—	—	Piano: Peter Pettinger
Salut d'Amour & Other Elgar Favourites (Chandos)	1984	—	—	—	—	—	
Elgar: Violin Concerto in B minor, Op. 61 (EMI)	1984	97	—	—	—	—	London Philharmonic Orchestra, Vernon Handley
Tchaikovsky; Violin Concerto / Chausson: Poeme (EMI)	1986	—	—	—	—	—	London Philharmonic Orchestra, Okko Kamu
Bartók: Mainly Black / Ellington: Sonata for Solo Violin (EMI)	1986	—	—	—	—	—	with Alec Dankworth (double bass)
Walton: Violin Concerto / Viola Concerto (EMI)	1987	—	—	—	—	—	Royal Philharmonic Orchestra, André Previn
Let Loose	1987	—	—	—	—	—	
Mendelssohn: Violin Concerto in E minor / Bruch: Violin Concerto No.1 / Schubert: Rondo in A (EMI)	1988	28	—	—	75	—	English Chamber Orchestra, Jeffrey Tate
Sibelius: Violin Concerto (EMI)	1988	—	—	—	—	—	City of Birmingham Symphony Orchestra, Sir Simon Rattle
Vivaldi: The Four Seasons (EMI)	1989	3	12	35	15	3	English Chamber Orchestra
Brahms: Violin Concerto in D, Op. 77 (EMI)	1991	—	71	—	76	29	London Philharmonic Orchestra, Klaus Tennstedt
Just Listen: Sibelius: Violin Concerto / Tchaikovsky: Violin Concerto (EMI)	1992	—	—	—	—	—	City of Birmingham Symphony Orchestra, Sir Simon Rattle / London Philharmonic Orchestra, Okko Kamu
Beethoven: Violin Concerto	1992	—	—	—	—	—	NDR Symphony Orchestra, Klaus Tennstedt
Tchaikovsky: Violin Concerto (EMI)	1993	—	—	—	—	—	London Philharmonic Orchestra, Okko Kamu
Kafka (EMI)	1996	67	—	—	—	—	
Elgar: Violin Concerto / Vaughan Williams: The Lark Ascending (EMI)	1997	—	—	—	—	—	(as Kennedy), City of Birmingham Symphony Orchestra, Sir Simon Rattle
Kreisler (EMI)	1998	—	—	—	—	—	(as Kennedy)
The Kennedy Experience (Sony)	1999	—	—	—	—	—	(as Kennedy)
Classic Kennedy (EMI)	1999	—	—	—	—	—	(as Kennedy)
Duos for Violin & Cello (EMI)	2000	—	—	—	—	—	as Kennedy with Lynn Harrell
Riders on the Storm: The Doors Concerto (Decca)	2000	—	—	—	—	—	as Kennedy with Jaz Coleman
Kennedy Plays Bach (EMI)	2000	—	73	47	—	—	(as Kennedy)
Greatest Hits (EMI)	2002	71	—	—	—	—	with various artists
Vivaldi	2003	—	—	—	—	36	Berliner Philharmoniker
East Meets East (EMI)	2003	—	—	—	—	—	with Kroke
Vivaldi II (EMI)	2004	—	—	39	—	—	Berliner Philharmoniker
Legend: Beethoven and Bruch (CD+DVD) (EMI)	2005	—	—	—	—	—	NDR Symphony Orchestra, Klaus Tennstedt / English Chamber Orchestra, Jeffrey Tate
Nigel Kennedy Plays Bach (DVD) (EMI)	2006	—	—	—	—	—	Irish Chamber Orchestra
Inner Thoughts (EMI)	2006	—	—	—	—	—	
Kennedy, Live at La Citadelle (DVD) (EMI)	2006	—	—	—	—	—	Polish Chamber Orchestra
The Blue Note Sessions (Blue Note)	2006	—	—	107	—	—	
The Platinum Collection (EMI)	2007	—	—	—	—	—	with various artists
Polish Spirit (EMI)	2007	—	—	—	—	—	Polish Chamber Orchestra, Jacek Kaspszyk
Beethoven: Violin Concerto / Mozart: Violin Concerto No.4 / Horace Silver: Creepin In (EMI)	2008	99	—	—	—	—	Polish Chamber Orchestra
A Very Nice Album (EMI)	2008	—	—	—	—	—	Nigel Kennedy Quintet (Nigel Kennedy, electric violin; Adam Kowalewski, bass; Paweł Dobrowolski, drums; Tomasz Grzegorski, tenor sax; Piotr Wyleżoł, piano) with vocals by Xantoné Blacq & Chris Loung; Sylwia Wójcik, cello; Suzy Willison-Kawalec, harp;
SHHH! (EMI)	2009	—	—	—	—	—	Nigel Kennedy Quintet (Nigel Kennedy, electric violin; Adam Kowalewski, contrabass & electric bass; Krzysztof Dziedzic, drums; Tomasz Grzegorski, tenor sax, soprano sax & bass clarinet; Piotr Wyleżoł, piano & Hammond) with vocals by Boy George
The Very Best of Nigel Kennedy (EMI)	2010	—	—	—	—	—	with various artists
The Four Elements	2011	—	—	—	—	—	
Recital (Sony)	2013	—	—	—	—	—	Nigel Kennedy Quintet (Nigel Kennedy, violin, celeste; Rolf Bussalb, acoustic guitar & 12 string; Yaron Stavi, bass; Krzysztof Dziedzic, drums; Barbara Dziewiecka, 2nd violin, viola)
The New Four Seasons	2014	—	—	—	—	—	
My World	2016	—	—	—	—	—	Composed by Nigel Kennedy, with the Oxford Philharmonic Orchestra & The Stella
