= Gideon (name) =

Gender neutral given name

- Pronunciation: ˈ/ˈɡɪdiən/
- Gender: Male
- Language: Hebrew, English, French
- Name day: 26 September (Croatia)

Origin
- Origin: Biblical military leader and judge Gideon
- Meaning: Hewer, feller, One who has a stump in place of a hand,

Other names
- See also: Gideon (Bible)
- Popularity: see popular names

Gideon (Hebrew: גדעון) is a gender neutral given name and surname of Hebrew origin which translates to 'feller' or 'hewer' (i.e. 'great warrior') in Hebrew. It can also be interpreted as "One who has a stump in place of a hand" or "One who cuts down". The name originates with the Biblical judge and leader Gideon, who impressed Calvinist groups like English Puritans and French Huguenots with his martial skill and utility. They then adopted it as a Christian name. The given name was first used in the 16th century when it became common to use 'Old Testament'-derived names. The Huguenots used the surrogate variation Gédéon. The name soon lost popularity in the 20th century as it declined to a low of four recorded newborn births in Great Britain during the 1930s with this name. Alternate spellings of this name include Gideone, Guideon, and Gidieon.

The first name started gaining use in the United States in the 1880s and was one of the rarer given names of the late 19th and 20th century. In recent years it has fluctuated in popularity with 1,016 newborns given this name in 2019. The name Gideon is the 308th most common name among U.S. social security statistics as of 2018.

== People with the given name ==
- Gideon Acland (1777–1819), English merchant
- Gideon Acquah (born 2000), Ghanaian footballer
- Gideon Adams (1755–1834), Canadian farmer, soldier and politician
- Gideon Adlon (born 1997), American actress
- Gideon Aigbefoh (born 1990), Nigerian weightlifter
- Gideon Winans Allen (1835–1912), American politician
- Gideon Amichay (born 1963), Israeli advertising executive, marketer and author
- Gideon Ariel (born 1939), Israeli Olympic competitor in the shot put and discus throw
- Gideon Asante (born 1992), Ghanaian footballer
- Gideon Baah (born 1991), Ghanaian football coach and player
- Gideon Babalola (born 1994), Nigerian badminton player
- Gideon D. Bailey (1819–1879), Canadian farmer and politician
- Gideon Barstow (1783–1852), American politician
- Gideon Ben-Yisrael (1923–2014), Israeli politician
- Gideon Bickel (born 1944), Israeli businessman
- Gideon Biwott (born 1964), Kenyan athlete
- Gideon Blackburn (1772–1838), American Presbyterian clergyman and educator
- Gideon Boateng (born 1991), Ghanaian footballer
- Gideon Louis Boissevain (1870–1924), American businessman and hotelier
- Gideon Bok (born 1966), American painter
- Gideon Brecher (1797–1873), Austrian writer and physician
- Gideon Brooke (c. 1814–1881), American politician and businessman
- Gideon Buthelezi (born 1986), South African boxer
- Gideon Byamugisha (born 1959), Ugandan priest and activist
- Gideon D. Camden (1805–1891), American lawyer, judge and politician
- Gideon J. Carpenter (1823–1910), American politician
- Gideon S. Case (1847–1931), American soldier and politician
- Gideon Asimulike Cheyo (born 1939), Tanzanian politician
- Gideon Chirchir (born 1966), Kenyan athlete
- Gideon Coe (born 1967), British radio DJ
- Gideon Cohen, Israeli footballer and manager
- Gideon Comstock (1709–1801), American politician and judge
- Gideon Conn (born 1980), English singer-songwriter
- Gideon Cornell (1710–1766), American farmer, merchant and judge
- Gideon Davidson (born 2006), American football player
- Gideon Davies (born 1964), British biochemist
- Gideon Defoe (born 1975), British writer
- Gideon Jacques Denny (1830–1886), American marine artist
- Gideon Doone, Micronesian politician
- Gideon Dreyfuss, American biochemist
- Gideon Ebijitimi (born 1981), Nigerian-born Romanian footballer
- Gideon Eilat (1924–2015), Israeli soldier
- Gideon Eliot (1664–1713), Scottish surgeon
- Gideon Elliott (1828–1869), Australian cricketer
- Gideon Emery (born 1972), English actor, jazz musician and voice actor
- Gideon Ericsson (1871–1936), Swedish sport shooter
- Gideon Ezra (1937–2012), Israeli politician
- Gideon Fisher (born 1965), Israeli lawyer
- Gideon Freudmann, American cellist
- Gideon Gadot (1941–2012), Israeli journalist and politician
- Gideon Gardner (1759–1832), American politician
- Gideon Gartner (1935–2020), Israeli entrepreneur and philanthropist
- Gideon Gathimba (born 1980), Kenyan runner
- Gideon Gechtman (1942–2008), Israeli artist and sculptor
- Gideon Gela-Mosby (born 1996), Australian rugby league footballer
- Gideon Gibson Jr. (1721–1792), American slaveholder and Regulator
- Gideon Githiga, Kenyan Anglican bishop
- Gideon Glick (born 1988), American actor
- Gideon Gono (born 1959), Zimbabwean banker
- Gideon Gorrequer (c. 1780–1841), Anglo-French soldier
- Gideon Greif (born 1951), Israeli historian
- Gideon Gross, Israeli immunologist, inventor and farmer
- Gideon Lucas Gwani, Nigerian politician
- Gideon Haigh (born 1965), Australian sports journalist
- Gideon Hard (1797–1885), American lawyer and politician
- Gideon Harvey (1630s–1700s), Dutch-English physician
- Gideon Hausner (1915–1990), Israeli jurist and politician
- Gideon Hawley (1727–1807), American missionary
- Gideon Henderson (born 1968), British geochemist
- Gideon Hiram Hollister (1817–1881), American politician, diplomat and author
- Gideon Hixon (1826–1892), American businessman and politician
- Gideon Holgate (1839–1895), English cricketer
- Gideon Hudson (born 1944), English cricketer
- Gideon Iitula (c. 1887–1971), Namibian Lutheran pastor
- Gideon Ireri, Kenyan Anglican bishop
- Gideon S. Ives (1846–1927), American politician
- Gideon Jablonka (born 1977), Israeli sprinter
- Gideon Joubert (1923–2010), South African writer and journalist
- Gideon Jung (born 1994), German footballer
- Gideon Khobane (born 1977), South African businessman
- Gideon King, American musician and businessman
- Gideon Gee-Bum Kim (born 1964), Korean-Canadian classical musician
- Gideon G. King (c. 1820–1860s), American politician
- Gideon Kipketer, Kenyan runner
- Gideon Klein (1919–1945), Czech pianist and composer
- Gideon Kleinman (born 1955), Israeli footballer
- Gideon Kliger (born 1980), Israeli Olympic sailor
- Gideon Koegelenberg (born 1994), South African rugby union player
- Gideon Koren (born 1947), Israeli-Canadian physician and musician
- Gideon Kouoru, Papua New Guinean rugby league footballer
- Gideon Obeng Kyeremeh (born 2003), Ghanaian footballer
- Gideon Kailipalaki Laanui (1840–1871), Hawaiian royal
- Gideon Peleioholani Laanui (1797–1849), Hawaiian chief and royal
- Gideon Gee-Bum Kim (born 1964), Korean-Canadian composer
- Gideon Lang (1819–1880), Australian pastoralist and politician
- Gideon Lee (1778–1841), American politician
- Gideon Lester (born 1972), British artistic director
- Gideon Levy (born 1953), Israeli journalist and author
- Gideon Levy (Dutch journalist) (born 1969), Dutch journalist and filmmaker
- Gideon Lichfield (born 1971), British journalist
- Gideon Lincecum (1793–1874), American pioneer, historian and naturalist
- Gideon E. Livingston (1927–2000), American food scientist
- Gideon London (1961–2010), British artist
- Gideon Louw (born 1987), South African swimmer
- Gideon Macon (c. 1648–1702), early American settler and politician
- Gideon Mantell (1790–1852), English geologist
- Gideon J. Mellenbergh (1938–2021), Dutch psychologist
- Gideon Mensah (footballer, born 1998), Ghanaian footballer
- Gideon Mensah (footballer, born 2000), Ghanaian footballer
- Gideon Meir (1947–2021), Israeli diplomat
- Gideon Meitlis (1941–2001), Israeli footballer
- Gideon Mendel (born 1959), South African photographer
- Gideon Mer (1894–1961), Israeli scientist
- Gideon Moi (born 1963), Kenyan politician
- Gideon C. Moody (1832–1904), American attorney and politician
- Gideon Morris (1745–1798), American settler and pioneer
- Gideon Mthembu (born 1963), Swazi runner and sports official
- Gideon Mung'aro, Kenyan politician
- Gideon Murray (died 1621), Scottish courtier and landowner
- Gideon Mwiti (born 1960), Kenyan politician
- Gideon Ndambuki (born 1947), Kenyan politician
- Gideon Ellis Newman (1823–1911), American politician
- Gideon Nieuwoudt (1951–2005), South African security policeman
- Gideon Nkojo (1936–2020), Ugandan economist
- Gideon Njoku (1940s–2011), Nigerian footballer and football coach
- Gideon Nxumalo (1929–1970), South African musician
- Gideon Nye (1812–1888), American diplomat, art collector, writer and merchant
- Gideon Obarzanek (born 1966), Australian choreographer, director and performing arts curator
- Gideon Obhakhan, Nigerian politician
- Gideon Ochieng (born 1967), Kenyan football coach and former player
- Gideon Ofrat (born 1945), Israeli art historian, curator and critic
- Gideon Okeke, Nigerian actor
- Gideon Olanrewaju (born 1993), Nigerian social entrepreneur
- Gideon Olin (1743–1823), American politician
- Gideon Oliphant-Murray (1877–1951), Scottish colonial administrator, politician and nobleman
- Gideon Omokirio (born 1976), Solomon Islands football coach and player
- Gideon Orkar (1952–1990), Nigerian military officer and coup participant
- George Gideon Oliver Osborne (born 1971), British Conservative politician, Chancellor of the Exchequer 2010–2016, newspaper editor and investment banker
- Gideon Ouseley (1762–1839), Anglo-Irish Methodist missionary
- Gideon Patt (1933–2020), Israeli politician
- Gideon Peters, South African cricketer
- Gideon Johnson Pillow (1806–1878), American lawyer and general
- Gideon Hollister Pond (1810–1878), American Presbyterian missionary, clergyman and territorial legislator
- Gideon Putnam (1763–1812), American miller, entrepreneur and city founder
- Gideon Quarcoo, Ghanaian politician
- Gideon Rachman (born 1963), British journalist
- Gideon Rafael (1913–1999), Israeli diplomat
- Gideon Raff (born 1972), Israeli film and television director, screenwriter and writer
- Gideon Ray (born 1973), American mixed martial artist
- Gideon Remez (born 1946), Israeli journalist
- Gideon Reynolds (1813–1896), American politician
- Gedeon Richter (1872–1944), Hungarian pharmacist
- Gideon Robertson (1874–1933), Canadian politician
- Gideon Rodan (1934–2006), American biochemist
- Gideon Rose (born 1964), American academic and magazine editor
- Gideon Rosen (born 1962), American philosopher
- Gideon Frank Rothwell (1836–1894), American politician
- Gideon Rubin (born 1973), Israeli artist
- Gideon Sa'ar (born 1966), Israeli politician
- Gideon Sagi (born 1939), Israeli politician
- Gideon Samson (born 1985), Dutch children's writer
- Gideon Sani (born 1990), Nigerian footballer
- Gideon Schechtman (born 1947), Israeli mathematician
- Gideon Scheepers (1878–1902), South African military leader
- Gideon Schocken (1919–1981), Israeli general
- Gideon Daniel Searle (1846–1917), American pharmacist and businessman
- Gideon Shryock (1802–1880), American architect
- Gideon Singer (1926–2015), Israeli actor and singer
- Gideon Lane Soule (1796–1879), American educator
- Gideon Smith (1889–1968), American football player and coach
- Gideon Smith, of Gideon Smith & the Dixie Damned, American rock musician
- Gideon Spiro (born 1935), Israeli journalist and left-wing activist
- Gideon Ståhlberg (1908–1967), Swedish chess player
- Gideon Stein (born 1971), American entrepreneur and philanthropist
- Gideon Striker (c. 1825–1886), Canadian businessman and politician
- Gideon Sundback (1880–1954), Swedish-American electrical engineer
- Gid Tanner (1885–1960), American fiddler
- Gideon Telpaz (1936–2017), Israeli author
- Gideon W. Thompson (1823–1902), American Civil War officer
- Gideon Tinsley (1927–2022), American politician
- Gideon Tish (born 1939), Israeli footballer
- Gideon Tomaschoff (born c. 1956), Israeli-Canadian painter
- Gideon Tomlinson (1780–1854), American politician
- Gideon Toury (1942–2016), Israeli translation scholar
- Gideon Trotter (born 1992), South African sprinter
- Gideon J. Tucker (1826–1899), American lawyer, newspaper editor and politician
- Gideon van der Merwe (born 1995), South African rugby union player
- Gideon van Meijeren (born 1988), Dutch politician and civil servant
- Gideon van Wyk (born 2001), South African rugby union player
- Gideon van Zyl (born 1989), South African judoka
- Gideon Brand van Zyl (1873–1956), South African politician
- Gideon Wahlberg (1890–1948), Swedish actor, screenwriter, director and theater manager
- Gideon Waja (born 1996), Ghanaian footballer
- Gideon Wanton (1693–1767), American politician
- Gideon Watts, South African rugby league footballer
- Gideon V. Way (born 1984), Indonesian footballer
- Gideon A. Weed (1833–1905), American politician and physician
- Gideon Welles (1802–1878), United States Secretary of the Navy
- Gideon Were (1934–1995), Kenyan historian
- Gideon White (1753–1833), American military officer and Canadian politician
- Gideon O. Whittemore (1800–1863), American lawyer and politician
- Gideon B. Williamson (1898–1981), American Nazarene minister and college president
- Gideon Wrampling (born 2001), New Zealand rugby union player
- Gideon Yago (born 1978), American writer and news correspondent
- Gideon Yego (born 1965), Kenyan athlete

== People with the surname ==
- Alexis Gideon (born 1980), American visual artist, director, composer, and performer
- Blake Gideon (born 1989), American football coach and former player
- Brett Gideon (born 1963), American baseball player
- Clarence Earl Gideon (1910–1972), prisoner who brought Gideon v. Wainwright to the Supreme Court
- Elmo Gideon (1924–2010), American artist known for the Gideon Holocaust Collection
- Jim Gideon (born 1953), American baseball player
- Jo Gideon (born 1952), British politician
- Llewella Gideon (born 1967), British actress, comedian, and writer
- Louan Gideon (1955–2014), American actress
- Marcus Fernaldi Gideon (born 1991), Indonesian badminton player
- Mary Gideon (born 1989), Nigerian badminton player
- Melville Gideon (1884–1933), American ragtime composer, lyricist, and performer
- Miriam Gideon (1906–1996), American composer
- Ron Gideon (born 1964), American baseball coach
- Sampson Gideon (1699–1762), British banker and philanthropist
- Samuel E. Gideon (1875–1945), American architect and architectural historian
- Sara Gideon (born 1971), American politician
- Sherrod Gideon (born 1977), American football player
- Wes Gideon (born 1937), Canadian football player
- Wilhelm Gideon (1898–1977), German Nazi SS concentration camp commandant
