= Aepytus (moth) =

Scientific classification
- Domain: Eukaryota
- Kingdom: Animalia
- Phylum: Arthropoda
- Class: Insecta
- Order: Lepidoptera
- Family: Hepialidae
- Genus: Aepytus; Herrich-Schäffer, 1856

Genus of moth

Aepytus is a genus of moths belonging to the family Hepialidae.

The species of this genus are found in Southern America.

Species:

- Aepytus assa Druce, 1887
- Aepytus biedermanni Viette, 1950
- Aepytus brasiliensis Viette, 1951
- Aepytus coscinophora Pfitzner, 1914
- Aepytus danieli Viette, 1961
- Aepytus dorita Schaus, 1901
- Aepytus equatorialis Viette, 1949
- Aepytus exclamans Herrich-Schäffer, 1855
- Aepytus fasslii Pfitzner, 1914
- Aepytus forsteri Viette, 1961
- Aepytus guarani
- Aepytus gugelmanni Viette, 1949
- Aepytus guyanensis Viette, 1951
- Aepytus helga Schaus, 1929
- Aepytus jeanneli Viette, 1950
- Aepytus lagopus Möschler, 1877
- Aepytus mahagoniatus Pfitzner, 1914
- Aepytus mexicanensis Viette, 1952
- Aepytus monoargenteus Viette, 1950
- Aepytus munona Schaus, 1929
- Aepytus omagua Pfitzner, 1937
- Aepytus petropolisiensis Viette, 1951
- Aepytus philiponi Viette, 1949
- Aepytus pluriargenteus Viette, 1955
- Aepytus saguanmachica Pfitzner, 1914
- Aepytus serta Schaus, 1894
- Aepytus sladeni Hampson, 1903
- Aepytus tesseloides Schaus, 1901
- Aepytus thisbe Druce, 1901
- Aepytus verresi Schaus, 1929
- Aepytus yungas Viette, 1961
- Aepytus zischkai Viette, 1961
