= Magua (disambiguation) =

Magua is a fictional Indian character in James Fenimore Cooper's The Last of the Mohicans.

Magua may also refer to:

- Cibyra magua, a species of moth
- Maguá, a chiefdom of Hispaniola
- The Roman Catholic Diocese of Magua, a short-lived Latin bishopric in what is now La Vega, Dominican Republic
- Magua (clothing), a type of Chinese jacket worn during the Qing dynasty (1644–1911)
- Magua (spider), an Australian spider genus in the family Amphinectidae
- Sospeter Magua (d. 2019), Kenyan Anglican bishop
