= Paltridge =

Paltridge is a surname. Notable people with the surname include:

- Garth Paltridge (born 1940), Australian atmospheric physicist
- Henry Paltridge, Anglican bishop in Kenya
- Jim Paltridge (1891–1980), English footballer
- Shane Paltridge KBE (1910–1966), Australian politician
- William Paltridge (1834–1890), Australian politician

== See also ==
- Patridge
