= Ireri =

Ireri is a surname. Notable people with the surname include:

- Anthony Ireri Mukobo (born 1949), Kenyan Catholic prelate
- Gideon Ireri, Kenyan Anglican bishop
- Margaret Ireri, Kenyan businesswoman
