= Kyeremeh =

Kyeremeh is an African surname that may refer to the following notable people:

- Emmanuel Kyeremeh, Ghanaian football team founder and business executive
- Alex Kyeremeh, Ghanaian politician
- Francis Kyeremeh (born 1997), Ghanaian football forward
- Gideon Obeng Kyeremeh (born 2003), Ghanaian football forward
- Godson Kyeremeh (born 2000), French football midfielder
- Gyamfi Kyeremeh (born 1995), Belgian football winger
- Joshua Kyeremeh, Ghanaian politician and administrator
- Kwadwo Kyeremeh Baah (born 2003), English football forwards
- Nicholas K. Adjei-Kyeremeh, Ghanaian politician
