= Gedion =

Gedion is a given name. Notable people with the name include:

- Gedion Ngatuny (born 1986), Kenyan long-distance runner
- Gedion Nyanhongo (born 1967), Zimbabwean sculptor
- Gedion Zelalem (born 1997), German-born American soccer player

== See also ==
- Gideon (name)
