= Waithaka (surname) =

Waithaka is a surname of Kenyan origin. Notable people with the surname include:

- Allan Waithaka, Anglican bishop in Kenya
- Daniel Waithaka, Kenyan politician
- Njeri Waithaka, Kenyan lawyer and criminologist
- Stanley Waithaka Mburu (born 2000), Kenyan long-distance runner
