= Quarcoo =

Quarcoo is a surname. Notable people with the surname include:

- Gideon Quarcoo (fl. 1967), Ghanaian politician
- Jonathan Quarcoo (born 1996), Norwegian sprinter
- Patrick Quarcoo (fl. 1967), Ghanaian entrepreneur
