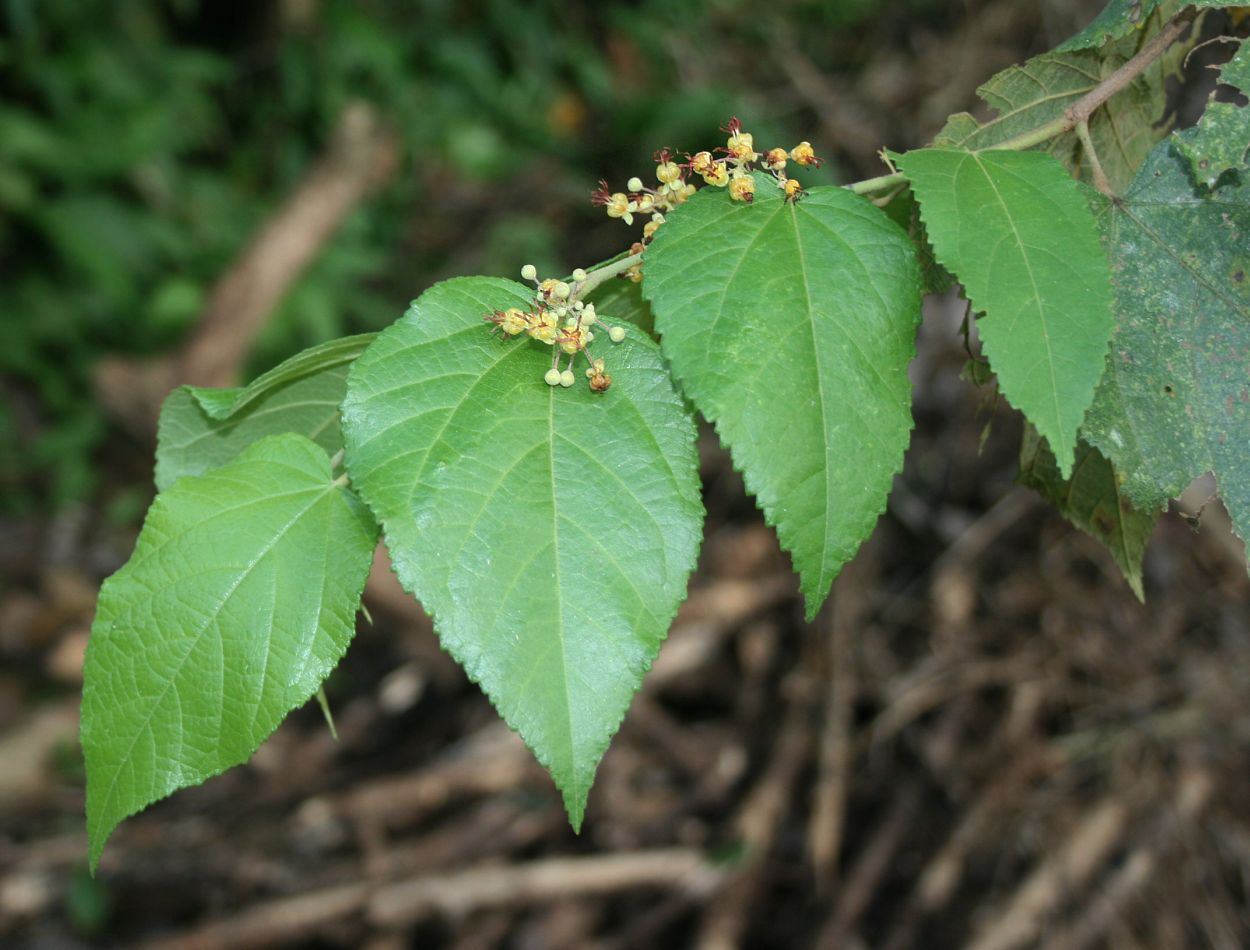
- Leaves

Conservation status
- Least Concern (IUCN 3.1)

Scientific classification
- Kingdom: Plantae
- Clade: Tracheophytes
- Clade: Angiosperms
- Clade: Eudicots
- Clade: Rosids
- Order: Malvales
- Family: Malvaceae
- Genus: Guazuma
- Species: G. ulmifolia

Binomial name
- Guazuma ulmifolia Lam.

= Guazuma ulmifolia =

Species of tree

Guazuma ulmifolia, commonly known as West Indian elm or bay cedar, is a medium-sized tree normally found in pastures and disturbed forests. This flowering plant from the family Malvaceae grows up to 30m in height and 30–40 cm in diameter. It is widely found in areas such as the Caribbean, South America, Central America and Mexico serving several uses that vary from its value in carpentry to its utility in medicine.

== Description ==
=== Botany ===
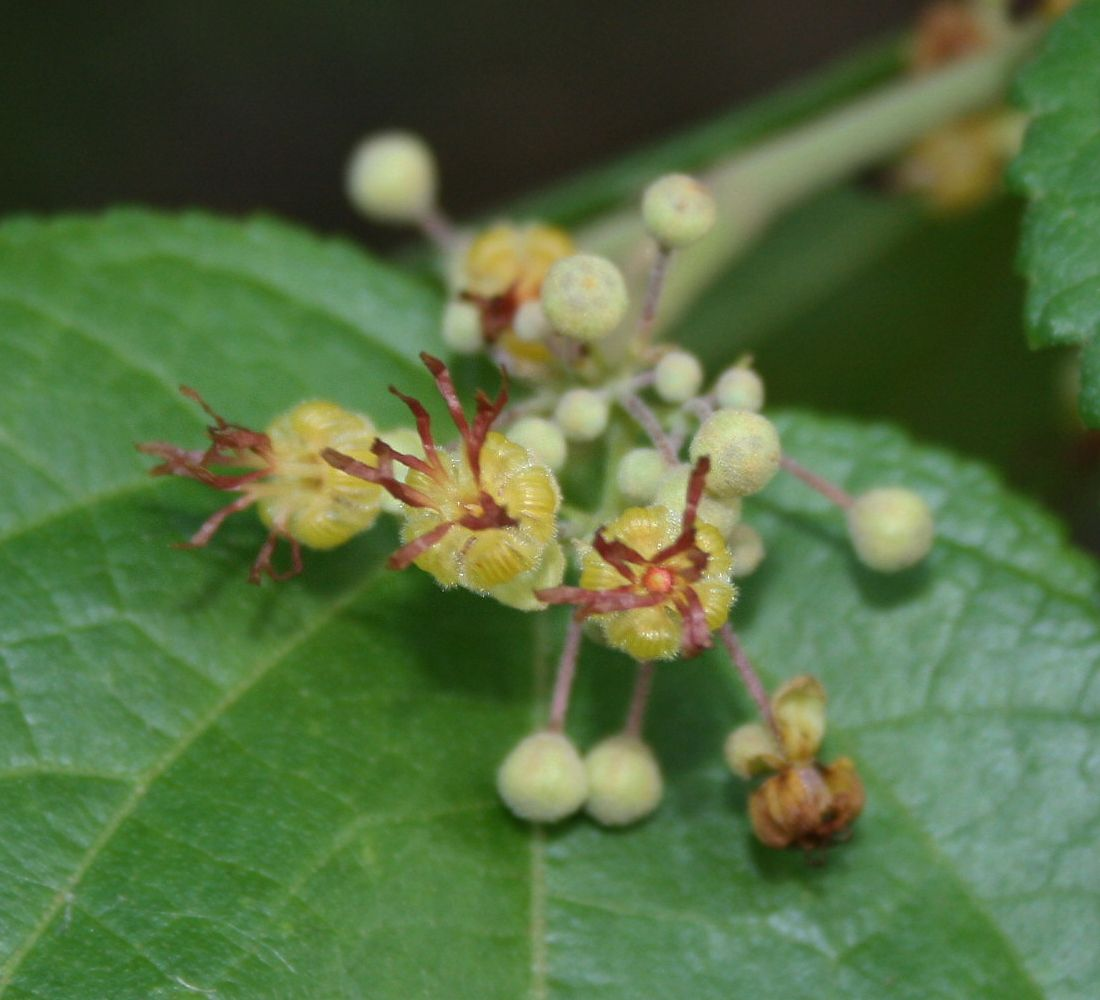
Guazuma ulmifolia flowers.

Guazuma ulmifolia grows to 30m in height and 30–40 cm in diameter and comes with a rounded crown. Leaves are distributed in an alternate pattern with 2 rows in assembled flatly. The leaves are ovate to lance-shaped, finely saw-toothed margin, usually have a rough texture and are 6–13 cm in length and 2.5–6 cm in diameter. Three to five main veins arise from the base (rounded or notched, unequal sided) of the leaf which has a darker green upper surface and a fairer green color underneath. They are virtually hairless and thin. The leaf stalks of this species are lean, approximately 6-12mm long, and are covered with small "star-shaped" hairs.

The panicles (indeterminate flower clusters) are in a branched pattern around 2.5–5 cm in length and are found at the bottom of the leaves. The flowers come in many, are short-stalked, small in size, have a brown-yellow color, five parted, 1 cm in length and have a small fragrance to them. The calyx contains are lobed (2–3), have hairs that are brown or light grey, as well as greenish. They have 5 petals with a yellow-like stamen, 15 anthers per pistil, 5 stigmas (combined), ovary lighter green in color with hairs, and also contains a style. The fruit which have capsules that are round to elliptical is 15-25mm in length. They have many seeds that are shaped like eggs and are 3mm in length, grey.

=== Propagation ===
The species flowers throughout the year, in particular from April to October. Guazuma ulmifolia can be cultivated by either directly planting seeds or cuttings of the plant, as well as root stumps and bare-root seedlings. Before planting the seeds they need to be soaked in boiling water for 30 seconds; the water should be drained afterward. 7–14 days after fresh seeds are planted, germination occurs (60-80% rate). When they reach a height of 30–40 cm which is usually about 15 weeks later they are then prepared for "outplanting." When using root stumps as a means for propagation they are left to dwell in a nursery for some time until the diameter of the stem reached 1.5-2.5 cm, which is usually about 5–8 months.

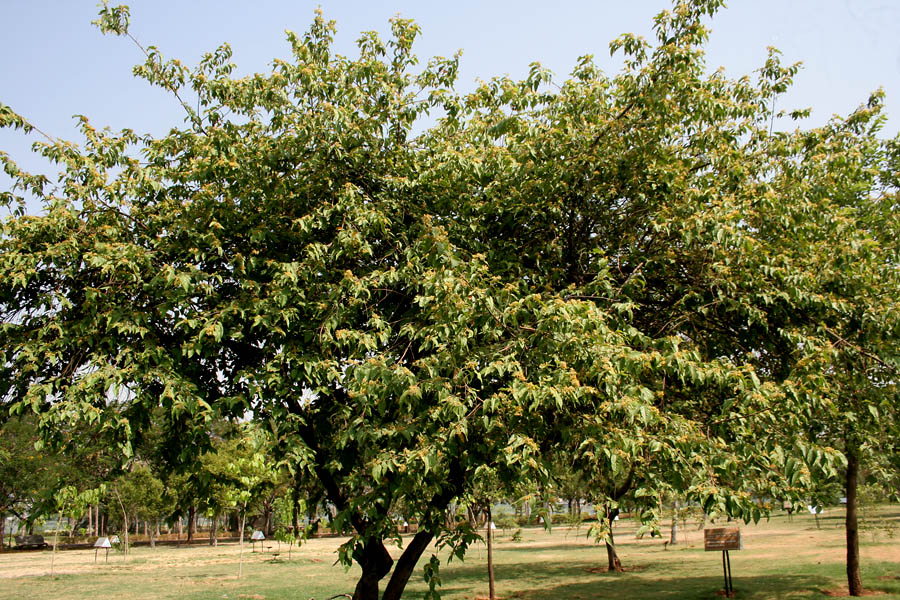
Guazuma ulmifolia (West Indian Elm)

=== Pests ===
The Guazuma ulmifolia falls prey most commonly to the defoliating insect Phelyypera distigma, as well as Arsenura armida, Epitragus sp., Aepytus sp., Automeris rubrescens, Hylesia lineata, Lirimiris truncata and Periphoba arcaei. These defoliators very rarely cause problems, but has been seen.

== Taxonomy ==
It was published by Jean-Baptiste Lamarck in 1789. In 1967, it was designated as the type species of its genus.

== Distribution ==
Guazuma ulmifolia is normally found in the Caribbean, Mexico, Central America and Colombia, Ecuador, Peru, Bolivia, Paraguay, Argentina, and Brazil. They are native to Antigua and Barbuda, Argentina, the Bahamas, Barbados, Bolivia, Brazil, Colombia, Cuba, Dominica, the Dominican Republic, Ecuador, Grenada, Guadeloupe, Guatemala, Haiti, Honduras, Jamaica, Martinique, Mexico, Montserrat, Netherlands, Nicaragua, Costa Rica, Panama, Paraguay, Peru, Puerto Rico, St Kitts and Nevis, St Lucia, St Vincent and the Grenadines, Trinidad and Tobago, and the Virgin Islands (US).

== Uses ==
=== Wood ===
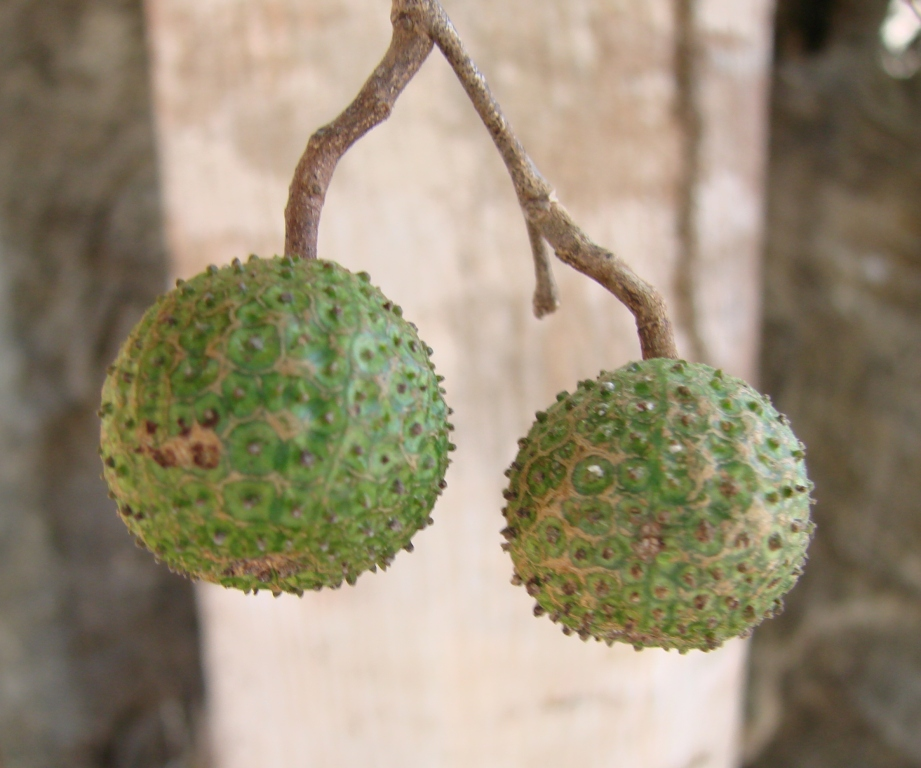
Fruits.

The wood of the Guazuma ulmifolia is utilized for posts, interior carpentry, light construction, boxes, crates, shoe horns, tool handles, and charcoal. The wood is found to be very unproblematic to work with. The sapwood has a color of brown (light) and the heartwood is pink to brown.

=== Other uses ===
Guazuma ulmifolia serves as a very vital source of fodder for livestock approaching the end of the dry season of the native array dry areas. It is the favored tree for fodder in Jamaica. The trees also serve to bestow shade in pastures. The immature fruits and leaves are given as food to horses and cattle. The fruits are also given to domestic pigs in Puerto Rico and the Dominican Republic. The leaves and fruits are usually fed to the cattle throughout the arid season. The trees may also serve the purpose of being actual posts surrounding pastures. The crunchy, woody fruits and its seeds are edible raw or cooked and have a mild, sweet, honey/granola like flavor.

Pixoy gum was used as a fixative in Maya stucco paintings at sites such as Ek'Balam in Yucatán, Mexico.

=== Medicinal ===
A beverage of crushed seeds soaked in water is used to treat diarrhea, dysentery, colds, coughs, contusions, and venereal disease. It is also used as a diuretic and astringent.
