= George Njuguna =

Anglican bishop in Kenya

George Mūirū Manasseh Njūgūna was an Anglican bishop in Kenya during the last quarter of the twentieth century.

Njūgūna was educated at St. Paul's University, Limuru and was ordained in 1968. He served in the Diocese of Nakuru. He was Bishop of Mount Kenya South from 1985 to 1995.
