= Cibyra sladeni =

Scientific classification
- Kingdom: Animalia
- Phylum: Arthropoda
- Class: Insecta
- Order: Lepidoptera
- Family: Hepialidae
- Genus: Cibyra
- Species: C. sladeni

Binomial name
- Cibyra sladeni (Hampson, 1903)

Synonyms
- Dalaca sladeni Hampson, 1903; Cibyra tupi Pfitzner, 1914

Species of moth

Cibyra sladeni is a species of moth of the family Hepialidae. It is known from Brazil.
