= Moses Nthuka =

Kenyan Anglican bishop

Moses Masamba Nthuka is an Anglican bishop in Kenya: he has been the Bishop of Mbeere since 12th Oct 2008.

Nthuka was educated at St. Paul's University, Limuru and Anglia Ruskin University Cambridge UK. He was ordained to Priesthood in March 1994 and has served in Kenya and England (Anglican Diocese of Hereford). He has also written a book entitled 'Africa's Faith Based Organizations in Transformational Development'.
