= Anglican dioceses of Mount Kenya =

Dioceses of the Anglican Church of Kenya

The Anglican dioceses of Mount Kenya represent the Anglican presence in east-central, northern and northeastern Kenya. They are part of the Anglican Church of Kenya. The remaining dioceses of the Church are located in the regions Mombasa, Maseno, and Nakuru.

== Diocese of Mount Kenya South ==
Diocese of Mount Kenya South

Location
- Ecclesiastical province: Anglican Church of Kenya

Information
- Cathedral: St James's Cathedral, Kiambu

Current leadership
- Bishop: Charles Muturi

Website
- http://ack-mtkenyasouth.org

The Diocese of Fort Hall was renamed as Mount Kenya diocese in 1964, a few years after its erection from the Diocese of Mombasa; it was then split in 1975, into East and South; Kariuki, the last Bishop of Mount Kenya, became the first Bishop of Mount Kenya South. The Central diocese was split off in 1984, the West in 1993, and then Thika diocese (from the South and Central dioceses) in 1998. The present cathedral is St James's Cathedral Kiambu.

=== Bishops of Fort Hall ===
- 1961–1964: Obadiah Kariuki

=== Bishops of Mount Kenya ===
- 1964–1975: Obadiah Kariuki
  - Esbon Ngaruiya, Assistant Bishop

=== Bishops of Mount Kenya South ===
- 1975–1976: Obadiah Kariuki (retired)
- 1976–1982: Sospeter Magua
- 1985–1995 : George Njuguna (resigned)
- 1996–2004: Peter Njenga
- 2004–2019: Timothy Ranji
- 2019–present: Charles Muturi (previously Assistant Bishop since 31 October 2010)

== Diocese of Embu ==
Diocese of Embu

Location
- Ecclesiastical province: Anglican Church of Kenya

Information
- Cathedral: St Paul's Cathedral, Embu

Current leadership
- Bishop: David Muriithi

Website
- http://ackembu.org

The Diocese of Mount Kenya East was erected from Mount Kenya diocese in 1975 and was itself then split on 1 July 1990, when Kirinyaga diocese was formed: Gitari was elected to that See, but the old cathedral of the eastern mountain diocese was in the new Embu diocese. On 1 July 1997, the Diocese was split again to create Mbeere diocese.

=== Bishops of Mount Kenya East ===
- 20 July 1975 – 1990: David Gitari (became first Bishop of Kirinyaga)
  - July 1984 – 1989: Bob Beak, Assistant Bishop of Marsabit

=== Bishops of Embu ===
- 1990–2006: Moses Njue
- 2 July 2006 – 2014: Henry Kathii (retired)
- 7 December 2014 – present: David Muriithi

== Diocese of Mount Kenya Central ==
Diocese of Mount Kenya Central

Location
- Ecclesiastical province: Anglican Church of Kenya

Information
- Cathedral: St James and All Martyrs Cathedral, Murang'a

Current leadership
- Bishop: Timothy Gichere

Erected in 1984 on the division of Mount Kenya South diocese, the Central diocese was itself split in 1993 (Mount Kenya West) and in 1998 (Thika).

=== Bishops of Mount Kenya Central ===
- 1984–1993: John Mahia-ini
- 1993–2003: Julius Gatambo
  - 16 June 2002 – present: Allan Waithaka, Assistant Bishop (also Archbishop's Commissary, i.e. acting bishop diocesan, 2015–2017)
- 2004–2015: Isaac Ng'ang'a
- 31 July 2017 – present: Timothy Gichere

== Diocese of Kirinyaga ==
Diocese of Kirinyaga

Location
- Ecclesiastical province: Anglican Church of Kenya

Information
- Cathedral: St Thomas Cathedral, Kerugoya

Current leadership
- Bishop: Joseph Kibuchua

Website
- http://ackirinyaga.org

The Kirinyaga diocese was created in July 1990 from the Diocese of Mount Kenya East; the Diocese of Meru was split from this diocese in 1997.

=== Bishops of Kirinyaga ===
- 1991–1997: David Gitari (previously Bishop of Mount Kenya East; became Archbishop of Kenya and Bishop of Nairobi)
- 1997–2012: Daniel Ngoru
  - ?–2006 (died): William Waqo, Assistant Bishop and Provincial Secretary
- 9 December 2012 – present: Joseph Kibuchua

== Diocese of Mount Kenya West ==
Diocese of Mount Kenya West

Location
- Ecclesiastical province: Anglican Church of Kenya

Information
- Cathedral: St Peter's Cathedral, Nyeri

Current leadership
- Bishop: Joseph Kagûnda

Mount Kenya West was erected in 1993 from Mount Kenya Central.

=== Bishops of Mount Kenya West ===
Between the diocese's erection and Chipman's consecration, the archdeacon, Domenic Mûthoga Ndaî, was Archbishop's Commissary (acting bishop).

- 4 July 1993 – 2004: Alfred Chipman
- 8 August 2004 – present: Joseph Kagûnda

== Diocese of Mbeere ==
Diocese of Mbeere

Location
- Ecclesiastical province: Anglican Church of Kenya

Information
- Cathedral: St Peter's Cathedral, Mbeere

Current leadership
- Bishop: Moses Nthuka

The Diocese of Mbeere was erected from the Diocese of Embu on 1 July 1997.

=== Bishops of Mbeere ===
- 26 October 1997 – ?: Gideon Ireri
- 12 October 2008 – present: Moses Nthuka

== Diocese of Meru ==
Diocese of Meru

Location
- Ecclesiastical province: Anglican Church of Kenya

Information
- Cathedral: St Stephen's Cathedral, Kinoru

Current leadership
- Bishop: Charles Mwendwa

1 July 1997 also saw the creation of the Diocese of Meru from the Diocese of Kirinyaga.

=== Bishops of Meru ===
- 1998–2002: Henry Paltridge
- 22 December 2002 – present: Charles Mwendwa

== Diocese of Thika ==
Diocese of Thika

Location
- Ecclesiastical province: Anglican Church of Kenya

Information
- Cathedral: St Andrew's Cathedral, Thika

Current leadership
- Bishop: Julius Wanyoike

Website
- http://ackthikadiocese.org/

Thika diocese was created from portions of two dioceses — Mount Kenya South and Mount Kenya Central — on 1 July 1998.

=== Bishops of Thika ===
At the first diocesan synod, 2 July 1998, John Mutonga, the archdeacon, was named the Archbishop's Commissary (i.e. acting bishop) until the first bishop's consecration.

- 31 January 1999 – ?: Gideon Githiga
- 2013–present: Julius Wanyoike

== Diocese of Marsabit ==
Diocese of Marsabit

Location
- Ecclesiastical province: Anglican Church of Kenya

Information
- Cathedral: St Peter's Cathedral, Marsabit

Current leadership
- Bishop: Qampicha Wario

Marsabit, then in the Diocese of Kirinyaga, was erected into a Mission Area directly under the Archbishop in 2008 — it was therefore part of the All Saints' Cathedral Diocese — and eventually given autonomy as its own diocese in 2011.

=== Bishops of Marsabit ===
Rob Martin was the bishop for the Mission Area from 2008, as a suffragan bishop of the Archbishop and therefore of the All Saints' Cathedral Diocese.

- 2011–2016: Rob Martin
- 2016–present: Daniel Qampicha Wario (consecrated 1 May 2016)

== Diocese of Murang'a South ==
Diocese of Murang'a South

Location
- Ecclesiastical province: Anglican Church of Kenya

Information
- Cathedral: St Peter's Cathedral, Kenol

Current leadership
- Bishop: Julius Karanu Gicheru

Website
- http://ackmurangasouth.org

Similarly, Murang'a South was another Mission Area of All Saints' from 2008, but originally part of Kirinyaga diocese. It has been a diocese in its own right since 2013.

=== Bishops of Murang'a South ===
- 25 May 2014 – present: Julius Karanu Gicheru
