= Daniel Ngoru =

Kenyan Anglican bishop

Daniel Ngoru was an Anglican priest in the Anglican Church of Kenya. He was Bishop of Kirinyaga from 1997 to 2012.
