= Cibyra mexicanensis =

Scientific classification
- Kingdom: Animalia
- Phylum: Arthropoda
- Class: Insecta
- Order: Lepidoptera
- Family: Hepialidae
- Genus: Cibyra
- Species: C. mexicanensis

Binomial name
- Cibyra mexicanensis (Viette, 1953)

Synonyms
- Pseudodalaca mexicanensis Viette, 1953

Species of moth

Cibyra mexicanensis is a species of moth of the family Hepialidae. It is known from Mexico, from which its species epithet is derived.
