= Cibyra dorita =

Scientific classification
- Domain: Eukaryota
- Kingdom: Animalia
- Phylum: Arthropoda
- Class: Insecta
- Order: Lepidoptera
- Family: Hepialidae
- Genus: Cibyra
- Species: C. dorita

Binomial name
- Cibyra dorita Schaus, 1901

Species of moth

Cibyra dorita is a species of moth of the family Hepialidae. It was described by William Schaus in 1901 and is known from Brazil.

The wingspan is about 33 mm. The costal and inner margins of the forewings are violaceous brown. The space between veins two to seven is dull golden, crossed by reddish veins and dull lilac-brown blotches, edged with reddish. The hindwings are buff at the base, shading to reddish on the outer margin.
