= Esbon Ngaruiya =

Esbon Ngarūiya was an Anglican bishop in Kenya during the last third of the twentieth century.

Ngarūiya was educated at St. Paul's University, Limuru and was made an ordained deacon in 1943 and a priest in 1945. He served in Limuru and Mombassa. In 1955 he became assistant bishop to Leonard Beecher the Bishop of Mombasa. He was consecrated assistant bishop of Mount Kenya in 1972; and then translated to the Diocese of Mount Kenya South in 1975.
