= Cibyra brunnea =

Scientific classification
- Domain: Eukaryota
- Kingdom: Animalia
- Phylum: Arthropoda
- Class: Insecta
- Order: Lepidoptera
- Family: Hepialidae
- Genus: Cibyra
- Species: C. brunnea

Binomial name
- Cibyra brunnea Schaus, 1901

Synonyms
- Yleuxas bradleyi Viette, 1951

Species of moth

Cibyra brunnea is a species of moth of the family Hepialidae. It was described by William Schaus in 1901 and is known from Venezuela and Peru.

The wingspan is about 31 mm. The forewings are light brown, the costa spotted with black. There is a basal and inner oblique row of dark brown spots, as well as a median row of large brown spots. There are also three silvery spots and a broad outer brown shade, edged on either side with dark brown and then fawn. The hindwings are dull blackish brown.
