= Julius Wanyoike =

Kenyan Anglican bishop

Julius Wanyoike (born 1967, Gaichanjiru) is an Anglican bishop in Kenya: he has been Bishop of Thika since 2013.

Wanyoike was born in 1967 and trained for ministry at Bishop Kariuki College from 1991 to 1993, he proceeded to Tangaza College and England for Bachelor's degree and Master's Degree respectively. He was ordained in 1993. He served at Ngong, Makongeni and Harborne, Birmingham, England. He is married with three children.
