= Cibyra mahagoniatus =

Scientific classification
- Domain: Eukaryota
- Kingdom: Animalia
- Phylum: Arthropoda
- Class: Insecta
- Order: Lepidoptera
- Family: Hepialidae
- Genus: Cibyra
- Species: C. mahagoniatus

Binomial name
- Cibyra mahagoniatus (Pfitzner, 1914)

Synonyms
- Pseudophassus mahagoniatus Pfitzner, 1914

Species of moth

Cibyra mahagoniatus is a species of moth of the family Hepialidae. It is known from Bolivia.
