= Moses Njue =

Moses Njue was an Anglican bishop in Kenya: he was the Bishop of Embu from 1990 to 2006.
