= Daniel Qampicha =

Anglican bishop in Kenya

Daniel Qampicha is an Anglican bishop in Kenya: he has been Bishop of Marsabit since his consecration on 1 May 2016.
