= Joseph Kagûnda =

Bishop in Kenya

Joseph Kagûnda is an Anglican bishop in Kenya: he has been Bishop of Mount Kenya West since 2004.
