= Cibyra serta =

Scientific classification
- Domain: Eukaryota
- Kingdom: Animalia
- Phylum: Arthropoda
- Class: Insecta
- Order: Lepidoptera
- Family: Hepialidae
- Genus: Cibyra
- Species: C. serta

Binomial name
- Cibyra serta (Schaus, 1894)

Synonyms
- Dalaca serta Schaus, 1894

Species of moth

Cibyra serta is a species of moth of the family Hepialidae. It is known from Mexico.
