= Carmel Agrexco =

Agrexco Agricultural Export Company Ltd.
- Company type: Partnership: Israeli government (50%), the Production and Marketing Boards (25%) and the Tnuva cooperative (25%)
- Industry: Exporters of agricultural produce
- Founded: 1956
- Headquarters: Tel Aviv, Israel
- Key people: Yaacov Tsur, Chairman of the Board; Shlomo Tirosh, Managing Director
- Products: Vegetables, Flowers, Fruits, Plants
- Revenue: ▲€560 million (2006)
- Number of employees: 500 employees in Israel and overseas (2006)
- Website: www.agrexco.co.il

Agrexco Agricultural Export Company Ltd. (trading as Carmel Agrexco) was Israel’s largest exporter of agricultural produce, with the European Union one of its major markets. Agrexco went into liquidation in August 2011, with debts of €175 million ($217 million), mainly owed to its bondholders that were mostly Israeli institutional investors. In 2011, the Israeli court approved the offer of Gideon Bickel and Chen Lamdan to purchase the Company for 17.6 million ILS in cash and 24.4 million ILS contingent on future performance of the Company.

== Etymology ==
The name "Agrexco" comes from the English words "Agriculture Export Company". "Carmel" is the internationally recognized brand name used by Agrexco for fresh produce exports from Israel.

== History ==
Agrexco was established in 1956.

== Company description ==
Agrexco was formerly a state-owned company, with 50% of its stock held by the State of Israel, 25% by the Israeli Production and Marketing Boards, and 25% by Tnuva. In August 2008, the Israeli government approved a privatization program for Agrexco, stipulating that at least 51% of Agrexco's stock should be tendered to private investors. This decision follows in the wake of the recently completed transformation of Tnuva from a cooperative owned by Israeli farmers (kibbutzim and moshavim) to a private company owned by Apax Partners. In 2007, Agrexco marketed 435,000 tons of fresh agricultural produce with a turnover of €653 million. This consisted mainly of vegetables (47%), cut flowers (19%), and fruits (14%). In addition to exporting the produce of Israeli farmers inside the Green Line and in West Bank settlements, Agrexco is the main export channel to Europe for Palestinian fresh produce from Gaza (carnations, strawberries, cherry tomatoes, vine tomatoes), which is marketed under the Coral brand name.

== Global market ==
Agrexco has a global network of marketing branches operating in London, Frankfurt, Paris, Rotterdam, New York, Zurich, Vienna, Madrid, and Milan. Special sales offices in Israel deal with countries where Agrexco does not have representative offices, such as Eastern Europe, the Far and Near East. Carmel Agrexco's main UK depot is in Swallowfield Way, Hayes, Middlesex.

== Organic produce ==
In 2009, Agrexco reported a sharp increase in the export of organic fruit and vegetables to Europe. Sales amounted to some €550 million. Agrexco also markets organic fruit and vegetables not sold in Israel, such as acorn squash, persimmons, Peruvian apple cactus, hot organic chili and mini palm tomatoes. Germany has shown the highest growth in demand for organic produce from Israel, followed by UK, France, Italy and Switzerland.

== Protests in the UK ==
In 2006, the British anti-poverty charity War on Want reported that in addition to being the largest exporter of Israeli produce, Agrexco was the leading exporter of produce from Israeli settlements. On 5 July 2007, ten activists entered Carmel Agrexco depot in Hayes, Middlesex. The Israeli flag was replaced with a Palestinian flag, and the black-and-red flag of anarcho-syndicalism took the place of the Union Flag. The activists handed leaflets to the workers, and two locked themselves to equipment with D locks. On 18 August 2007, activists from the Camp for Climate Action entered Carmel Agrexco's UK warehouse, tore down the Israeli flag and locked themselves to gates. The UK Press Association quoted Amos Orr, the general manager: “A lot of them were drunk. They broke doors, spread papers everywhere and they were very aggressive. They were singing about Hamas.” These allegations have not been verified. On 21 June 2008, activists occupied and shut down Carmel Agrexco's HQ and UK freight warehouse for over six hours.

== See also ==
- Agrexco faces liquidation after BDS boycott campaign
- Agriculture in Israel
- Economy of Palestine
- Economy of Israel
- Strawberry Fields, a 2006 Israeli documentary film
