= Cibyra biedermanni =

Scientific classification
- Kingdom: Animalia
- Phylum: Arthropoda
- Class: Insecta
- Order: Lepidoptera
- Family: Hepialidae
- Genus: Cibyra
- Species: C. biedermanni

Binomial name
- Cibyra biedermanni (Viette, 1950)

Synonyms
- Schaefferiana biedermanni Viette, 1950

Species of moth

Cibyra biedermanni is a species of moth of the family Hepialidae. It is known from Brazil.
