= Alfred Chipman =

Australian Anglican bishop

Alfred Chipman was an Anglican bishop in Kenya: he was Bishop of Mount Kenya West from 1993 to 2004.

An Australian, Chipman was a pioneer of youth development in Kenya. Between the diocese's inauguration and Chipman's consecration, the archdeacon, Domenic Mûthoga Ndaî, was Archbishop's Commissary (acting bishop). He also worked in doldol ACK church in the eighties and nighties.
