= David Muriithi =

David Muriithi Ireri was an Anglican bishop in Kenya: he has been the Bishop of Embu since 2014.
