= Isaac Ng'ang'a =

Kenyan Anglican bishop

Isaac Ng'ang'a was an Anglican bishop in Kenya. He was Bishop of Mount Kenya Central from 2004 to 2015.
