= Timothy Gichere =

Anglican bishop in Kenya

Timothy Gichere is an Anglican bishop in Kenya he has been Bishop of Mount Kenya Central since 2017.
