= Peter Njenga =

Peter Njenga (b. 1937) was an Anglican bishop in Kenya; he was Bishop of Mount Kenya South from 1996 to 2004. Njenga's pastoral leadership coincided with decolonisation within the Anglican Church of Kenya and rise of authoritarian rule in Kenya. His ministry has been described as that of a 'prominent prophetic presence in Kenya's civic life during the authoritarian and oppressive presidency of Daniel arap Moi.'

During the 1970s, Njenga was a priest assigned to pastor traditionally white, European congregations in the Kiambu County towns of Limuru and Thika. He describes this time as one in which 'The whites simply could not accept that they were now under African leadership.'

Bishop Njenga was a prominent clergy voice in Kenya during the presidency of Daniel arap Moi between 1978 and 2002. Njenga was then provost of ACK All Saints’ Cathedral in Nairobi. Under his leadership, the cathedral became a place of refuge for mothers seeking information about 'disappeared' children and hosted funerals of victims of extrajudicial killings by the government. In 1992, a group of wives and mothers of political detainnes sought refuge in All Saints Cathedral following an Ash Wednesday service. Njenga personally saw to it that the women were fed and cared for.

The Rev. Njenga's sermons critical of the Moi government were reported in the popular press. The Kenyan government attempted to curtail Njenga's outspokenness through intimidation of his family and even attempted to frame him as a murderer following his wife's death by suicide.
