= Cibyra nigrovenosalis =

Scientific classification
- Kingdom: Animalia
- Phylum: Arthropoda
- Class: Insecta
- Order: Lepidoptera
- Family: Hepialidae
- Genus: Cibyra
- Species: C. nigrovenosalis

Binomial name
- Cibyra nigrovenosalis (Viette, 1956)

Synonyms
- Paragorgopis nigrovenosalis Viette, 1956

Species of moth

Cibyra nigrovenosalis is a species of moth of the family Hepialidae. It is known from Brazil.
