= Strawberry Fields (2006 film) =

- Directed by: Ayelet Heller
- Country of origin: Israel
- Original language: Arabic

Production
- Producer: Osnat Trabelsi
- Cinematography: Aanas Rihan
- Editor: Yoni Kohen
- Running time: 60 minutes

Original release
- Release: 2006

Strawberry Fields is a 2006 documentary film by Israeli filmmaker Ayelet Heller about the hardships faced by Palestinian strawberry farmers in Gaza, who find their livelihood disrupted by the Israel-Gaza conflict.

== Plot ==
Strawberry Fields points out that strawberries grown in Gaza are the only agricultural product marketed internationally as being of Palestinian origin. One of the major Gaza strawberry farms in located at Beit Lahiya. More than 1,500 tons of strawberries are exported from Gaza to Europe through the Israeli company Agrexco. In order to get overseas, however, the fruits need to pass through the checkpoint that separates Israel and Gaza. The 2005–2006 growing season coincided with the Israel's disengagement from Gaza and the rise of Hamas as the ruling political entity. The armed conflict between Israel and Hamas resulted in the closing of the border checkpoint. The strawberries grown at Beit Lahiya cannot leave Gaza, resulting in significant losses for the farmers and their Agrexco partners. Unable to transport their produce, the farmers have no choice but to dispose of their crop and prepare for the following year's growing season.

== Production ==
Ayelet Heller stated she wanted Strawberry Fields to be seen as a documentary that covers the human aspect of the Palestinian-Israeli conflict, rather than the political elements. "I wanted to do a film about strawberries and hope, relationships between Israelis and Palestinians," she said in an interview with Agence France Presse, adding that many Israeli had serious misperceptions about Gaza. "For them, Gaza is the most dangerous place of the planet. But in the film, I am accepted by people who are nice, who tell jokes."

Heller also stated that she did not tell her family and friends she was working in Gaza, in order to save them from worrying about her safety and security.

Strawberry Fields was shot between June 2005 and March 2006, the strawberry growing season at Beit Lahiya. Throughout production, gunshots could be heard in the near distance while filming was underway. At one point, Heller's crew telephoned the Israeli Air Force to ask not to be bombed because they were shooting the film.

== Release ==
Strawberry Fields had its premiere on Israeli television and played in film festivals in Europe and North America. Sean Farnel, director of programing for the Hot Docs Film Festival in Toronto, praised the film for providing a different approach of examination for the ongoing Israeli-Palestinian conflict.

In the U.S., Strawberry Fields was released in non-theatrical DVD distribution by Cinema Guild Inc.
