= Patridge =

Patridge is a surname. Notable people with the surname include:

- Audrina Patridge (born 1985), actress and model
- Rob Patridge, American politician
- Scott Patridge (born 1965), tennis player
- Stewart Patridge (born 1974), American football quarterback

== See also ==
- Paltridge
- Partridge
