= Julius Gatambo =

Kenyan Anglican bishop

Julius Gatambo (b 1939) was an Anglican bishop in Kenya during the last quarter of the twentieth century.

Gatambo was educated at St. Paul's University, Limuru and was ordained in 1974. He was bishop of Mount Kenya Central from 1993 to 2003.
