= Cibyra (moth) =

Scientific classification
- Domain: Eukaryota
- Kingdom: Animalia
- Phylum: Arthropoda
- Class: Insecta
- Order: Lepidoptera
- Family: Hepialidae
- Genus: Cibyra; Walker, 1856

Species
- See text.

Synonyms
- Hampsoniella Viette, 1950; Pseudodalaca Viette, 1950; Gymelloxes Viette, 1952; Alloaepytus Viette, 1951; Aepytus Herrich-Schaffer, [1858]; Thiastyx Viette, 1951; Schaefferiana Viette, 1950; Paragorgopis Viette, 1952; Hepialyxodes Viette, 1951; Xytrops Viette, 1951; Lamelliformia Viette, 1952; Tricladia Felder, 1874; Pseudophassus Pfitzner, 1914; Parana Viette, 1950; Pseudophilaenia Viette, 1951; Philoenia Kirby, 1892; Philaenia; Yleuxas Viette, 1951

Genus of moths

Cibyra is a genus of moths of the family Hepalidae. There are 50 described species, found throughout Central and South America.

== Species ==
- Cibyra assa - Mexico
- Cibyra biedermanni - Brazil
- Cibyra brasiliensis - Brazil
- Cibyra brunnea - Venezuela/Peru
- Cibyra catharinae - Brazil
- Cibyra danieli - Brazil
- Cibyra dorita - Brazil
- Cibyra epigramma - Brazil
- Cibyra equatorialis - Ecuador
- Cibyra exclamans - Brazil
- Cibyra fasslii - Colombia
- Cibyra ferruginosa - Brazil
- Cibyra foetterlei - Brazil
- Cibyra forsteri - Bolivia
- Cibyra gugelmanni - Mexico
- Cibyra guyanensis - French Guiana
- Cibyra helga - Brazil
- Cibyra indicata - Ecuador
- Cibyra jeanneli - Brazil
- Cibyra jordani - Brazil
- Cibyra lagopus - Suriname
- Cibyra magua - Peru
- Cibyra mahagoniatus - Bolivia
- Cibyra mexicanensis - Mexico
- Cibyra monoargenteus - Brazil
- Cibyra munona - Brazil
- Cibyra nigrovenosalis - Brazil
- Cibyra oreas - Brazil
- Cibyra paropus - Ecuador
- Cibyra petropolisiensis - Brazil
- Cibyra philiponi - Brazil
- Cibyra pittionii - Brazil
- Cibyra pluriargenteus - Brazil
- Cibyra poltrona - Brazil
- Cibyra prytanes - Brazil
- Cibyra rileyi - Brazil
- Cibyra saguanmachica - Colombia
- Cibyra schausi - Brazil
- Cibyra serta - Mexico
- Cibyra simplex - Brazil
- Cibyra sladeni - Brazil
- Cibyra spitzi - Brazil
- Cibyra terea - Panama/Mexico
- Cibyra tesselloides - Brazil/Paraguay
- Cibyra thisbe - Colombia
- Cibyra trilinearis - Colombia
- Cibyra umbrifera - Brazil
- Cibyra verresi - Brazil
- Cibyra yungas - Bolivia
- Cibyra zischkai - Bolivia
