= Cibyra trilinearis =

Scientific classification
- Domain: Eukaryota
- Kingdom: Animalia
- Phylum: Arthropoda
- Class: Insecta
- Order: Lepidoptera
- Family: Hepialidae
- Genus: Cibyra
- Species: C. trilinearis

Binomial name
- Cibyra trilinearis (Pfitzner, 1914)

Synonyms
- Dalaca trilinearis Pfitzner, 1914; Cibyra trilinearides Pfitzner, 1937

Species of moth

Cibyra trilinearis is a species of moth of the family Hepialidae. It is known from Colombia.
