= Cibyra paropus =

Scientific classification
- Domain: Eukaryota
- Kingdom: Animalia
- Phylum: Arthropoda
- Class: Insecta
- Order: Lepidoptera
- Family: Hepialidae
- Genus: Cibyra
- Species: C. paropus

Binomial name
- Cibyra paropus (H. Druce, 1890)

Synonyms
- Hepialus paropus H. Druce, 1890

Species of moth

Cibyra paropus is a species of moth of the family Hepialidae. It is known from Ecuador.
