= Joseph Kibuchua =

Joseph Kibuchua is an Anglican bishop in Kenya: he has been Bishop of Kirinyaga since 2012.
