= Cibyra yungas =

Scientific classification
- Kingdom: Animalia
- Phylum: Arthropoda
- Class: Insecta
- Order: Lepidoptera
- Family: Hepialidae
- Genus: Cibyra
- Species: C. yungas

Binomial name
- Cibyra yungas (Viette, 1961)

Synonyms
- Xytrops yungas Viette, 1961

Species of moth

Cibyra yungas is a species of moth of the family Hepialidae. It is known from Bolivia.
