= Cibyra catharinae =

Scientific classification
- Kingdom: Animalia
- Phylum: Arthropoda
- Class: Insecta
- Order: Lepidoptera
- Family: Hepialidae
- Genus: Cibyra
- Species: C. catharinae

Binomial name
- Cibyra catharinae (Viette, 1951)

Synonyms
- Thiastyx catharinae Viette, 1951

Species of moth

Cibyra catharinae is a species of moth of the family Hepialidae. It is found in Brazil.
