= Charles Mwendwa =

Anglican bishop in Kenya

Charles Mwendwa is an Anglican bishop in Kenya: he has been the Bishop of Meru since 2002.

In 2019 he became the Provincial Dean of the Anglican Church of Kenya.
