= Cibyra tesselloides =

Scientific classification
- Domain: Eukaryota
- Kingdom: Animalia
- Phylum: Arthropoda
- Class: Insecta
- Order: Lepidoptera
- Family: Hepialidae
- Genus: Cibyra
- Species: C. tesselloides

Binomial name
- Cibyra tesselloides (Schaus, 1901)

Synonyms
- Dalaca tesselloides Schaus, 1901; Dalaca coscinophora Pfitzner, 1914

Species of moth

Cibyra tesselloides is a species of moth of the family Hepialidae. It was described by William Schaus in 1901 and is known from Brazil and Paraguay.

The wingspan is about 62 mm. The forewings are pale brown, the cell and spaces between the veins evenly filled with darker streaks. The hindwings are light reddish brown.
