= Cibyra umbrifera =

Scientific classification
- Domain: Eukaryota
- Kingdom: Animalia
- Phylum: Arthropoda
- Class: Insecta
- Order: Lepidoptera
- Family: Hepialidae
- Genus: Cibyra
- Species: C. umbrifera

Binomial name
- Cibyra umbrifera (Felder, 1874)

Synonyms
- Tricladia umbrifera Felder, 1874

Species of moth

Cibyra umbrifera is a species of moth of the family Hepialidae. It is known from Brazil.
