= Timothy Ranji =

Anglican bishop in Kenya

Timothy Ranji is an Anglican bishop in Kenya. He was the Bishop of Mount Kenya South until December 2019 where he handed over to the Rt. Revd. Canon Charles M. Muturi, the current Bishop of this diocese. He served as Provost, ACK St.James Cathedral Kiambu and as a Priest in this diocese. He has been pivotal in spurring the Mt. Kenya South Diocese to great heights.
