= Cibyra schausi =

Scientific classification
- Kingdom: Animalia
- Phylum: Arthropoda
- Class: Insecta
- Order: Lepidoptera
- Family: Hepialidae
- Genus: Cibyra
- Species: C. schausi

Binomial name
- Cibyra schausi (Viette, 1952)

Synonyms
- Paragorgopis schausi Viette, 1952

Species of moth

Cibyra schausi is a species of moth of the family Hepialidae. It is known from Brazil.
