= Gideon King & City Blog =

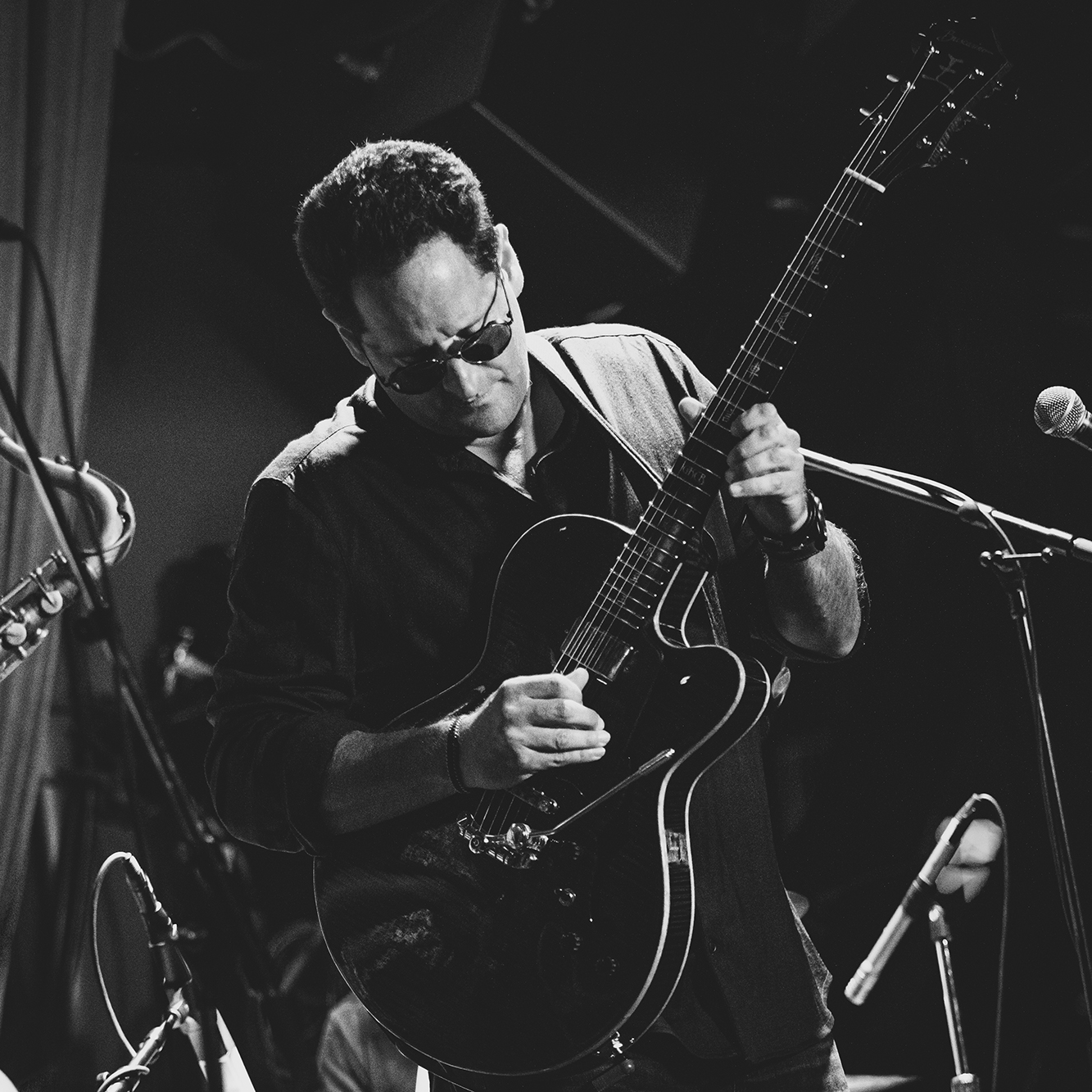

Background information
- Origin: New York City, U.S.
- Genres: Jazz; rock; R&B; blues
- Years active: 2015–present
- Website: www.gideonkingcityblog.com

Gideon King & City Blog (GKCB) is an American band based in New York City. They blend elements of rock, jazz, R&B, blues and sophisticated studio production with three part harmony. It was founded by Gideon King.

Gideon King & City Blog has been compared to Steely Dan, a band they share a member with. The band performs live and is based out of New York City.American Songwriter describes the vision behind the band as following "the Steely Dan model of putting together the right musicians in the studio to record."

== Music ==
Gideon King is a guitar player. He started to play at the age of 10 inspired by his highly musical family. In 2015, he formed Gideon King & City Blog, a studio project inspired by John Scofield, Pat Metheny, Steely Dan, Earth, Wind & Fire, John Mayer and Stevie Wonder. Later that same year he wrote and released City Blog, a critically acclaimed debut. He has worked with jazz and pop musicians including John Scofield, James Genus, Marc Broussard, Donny McCaslin, Carolyn Leonhart, Grace Weber, and Elliott Skinner. In 2018 the band released a followup to City Blog, entitled Upscale Madhouse. This was followed in 2020 by the Love Knot EP. In response Offbeat Magazine called Gideon King "a rare example of the modern-day Renaissance man."

The Huffington Post reviewed City Blog, writing, "An aurally rich group filled with sophisticated musicality, their newest self-titled album is full of vibrant arrangements, edgy lyrics, and chilled-out vibes." All About Jazz said, "Fans of Steely Dan will undoubtedly get a lot from City Blog, but so will fans of contemporary songwriters such as Norah Jones, and even listeners of introspective composers like Pat Metheny will find similarities between King's harmonically conscious, melody driven songs and Metheny's melodic sensibilities." Sputnikmusic was less positive about the record, saying, "there are a few tracks that should have been left off." Sputnik went on to say, "despite this, Gideon King and City Blog's self titled debut is jam packed with a little something for every music fan."

Their 2018 album Upscale Madhouse features appearances from many of the musicians from City Blog, as well as Conrad Sewell, Nate Smith, Grégoire Maret, Brendan Fletcher (The Voice semifinalist), Kate Kelsey Sugg and Adrian Harpham. The first single was released on June 22, 2018. In a 2016 interview, Gideon King said of the new record, "I would say one of the great things about Steely Dan is they were going for sonic perfection. They labored to the bone to get things sounding right, and that's what we're trying to do." One early reviewer of Upscale Madhouse wrote, "This is the most unique track I've heard in a while. The feel of this song embodies New York City living to a tee. The mixture of sounds and influences can be heard all over this four minute and ten-second breath of fresh air. It's the most refreshing track you'll hear all year."

In the wake of the coronavirus pandemic, Gideon King & City Blog released the Love Knot EP which Goldmine called, "both sophisticated and accessible."

== Discography ==
- City Blog (2015)
- Upscale Madhouse (2018)
- Lady of a Thousand Sorries (2019)
- Audience of One (2019)
- Love Knot (2020)
