= Cibyra rileyi =

Scientific classification
- Kingdom: Animalia
- Phylum: Arthropoda
- Class: Insecta
- Order: Lepidoptera
- Family: Hepialidae
- Genus: Cibyra
- Species: C. rileyi

Binomial name
- Cibyra rileyi (Viette, 1951)

Synonyms
- Hepialyxodes rileyi Viette, 1951

Species of moth

Cibyra rileyi is a species of moth of the family Hepialidae. It is native to Brazil.
