= Henry Kathii =

Henry Kathii was an Anglican bishop in Kenya: he was the Bishop of Embu from 2006 to 2014.

Kathii was educated at the University of Nairobi and Azusa Pacific University. Kathii served on the National Council of Churches of Kenya; and was General Secretary of the Bible Society of Kenya.
