= John Mahia-ini =

Kenyan Anglican bishop

John Mahia-ini was an Anglican bishop in Kenya during the last quarter of the twentieth century. he was Bishop of Mount Kenya Central from 1984 to 1993. After his retirement, Bishop Mahiaini and his wife started a school called St. Anna Care Centre for orphans and the vulnerable in Gathukiini, his hometown. The school currently has a population of 390 children from the local community and serves 150 elderly men and women. This work is supported by people of good will both in Kenya and abroad; Britain, America, Slovakia, Sweden and Canada.
