= Cibyra poltrona =

Scientific classification
- Domain: Eukaryota
- Kingdom: Animalia
- Phylum: Arthropoda
- Class: Insecta
- Order: Lepidoptera
- Family: Hepialidae
- Genus: Cibyra
- Species: C. poltrona

Binomial name
- Cibyra poltrona Schaus, 1901

Species of moth

Cibyra poltrona is a species of moth of the family Hepialidae. It was described by William Schaus in 1901 and is known from Brazil.

The wingspan is about 40 mm. The forewings are ochreous brown on the costa and inner margin, while the intermediate space is more ochreous. There are some indistinct darker transverse lines on the terminal half. The hindwings are reddish brown.
