= Rob Martin (bishop) =

Robert David Markland (Rob) Martin (born 1949) was the first Bishop of Marsabit in the Anglican Church of Kenya.

Martin was educated at Woodcote House School and Bradfield College. For university he studied at Trinity College, Cambridge and Trinity College, Bristol. He was ordained deacon in 1991, priest in 1992 and bishop in 2008. After a curacy in Kingswood he was Vicar of Frome from 1995 until his appointment as bishop. He was consecrated in March 2008, to serve as suffragan Bishop of Marsabit mission area of the All Saints' Cathedral Diocese; with the area's erection into the Anglican Diocese of Marsabit on 24 July 2011, he was installed as diocesan bishop. He retired back to the UK in 2016.
