= Bob Beak =

Anglican bishop (1925–2018)

- Assistant Bishop of Marsabit
- Diocese: Diocese of Mount Kenya East
- In office: 1984–1989
- Other posts: Rector of Heanton (1970–1984); Honorary assistant bishop, Diocese of Derby (1991–2018)

Orders
- Ordination: 1953 (deacon); 1954 (priest)
- Consecration: 1984

Personal details
- Born: 1925
- Denomination: Anglican
- Education: London Bible College

Robert Michael Cawthorn Beak OBE (1925 – 13 January 2018) was an Anglican bishop.

Beak trained at the London Bible College, was ordained deacon in 1953 and priest in 1954, serving his Title (curacy) at St John's Church, Tunbridge Wells, 1953–1955. Associated with the Bible Churchmen's Missionary Society 1955–1956 and 1984–1989, he spent 1956–1969 and 1984–1989 in Kenya. Between these stints, he was a parish priest in Devon. There, he was Rector of Heanton from 1970 (and of Marwood, Devon from 1979), being also rural dean of Barnstaple (1977–1981) and a prebendary of Exeter Cathedral (1982–1984).

All of these appointments ended with his 1984 appointment and consecration as Assistant Bishop of Marsabit in the Diocese of Mount Kenya East, Church of the Province of Kenya, where he remained until 1989. He brought development to Marsabit by planted churches and trained evangelists. Through Crosslinks, he oversaw feeding programmes and helped the Government distribute. For his work during the famine and in Kenya, he was later awarded the OBE. Marsabit became an autonomous diocese in 2011.

He retired in 1990 and became an Officer of the Order of the British Empire (OBE) that year. From 1991, he was licensed as an honorary assistant bishop in the Diocese of Derby, Church of England. He retired (again) from ministry in July 2013, having been a priest at All Saints' Church, Ashover.

He died on 13 January 2018 at the age of 92.
