= Cibyra terea =

Scientific classification
- Domain: Eukaryota
- Kingdom: Animalia
- Phylum: Arthropoda
- Class: Insecta
- Order: Lepidoptera
- Family: Hepialidae
- Genus: Cibyra
- Species: C. terea

Binomial name
- Cibyra terea (Schaus, 1892)

Synonyms
- Dalaca terea Schaus, 1892; Dalaca muysca Pfitzner, 1914

Species of moth

Cibyra terea is a species of moth of the family Hepialidae. It is known from Panama and Mexico.
