= Cibyra indicata =

Scientific classification
- Domain: Eukaryota
- Kingdom: Animalia
- Phylum: Arthropoda
- Class: Insecta
- Order: Lepidoptera
- Family: Hepialidae
- Genus: Cibyra
- Species: C. indicata

Binomial name
- Cibyra indicata (Strand, 1912)

Synonyms
- Dalaca indicata Strand, 1912

Species of moth

Cibyra indicata is a species of moth of the family Hepialidae. It is known from Ecuador.
