= Cibyra lagopus =

Scientific classification
- Kingdom: Animalia
- Phylum: Arthropoda
- Class: Insecta
- Order: Lepidoptera
- Family: Hepialidae
- Genus: Cibyra
- Species: C. lagopus

Binomial name
- Cibyra lagopus (Moschler, 1877)

Synonyms
- Pharmacis lagopus Moschler, 1877

Species of moth

Cibyra lagopus is a species of moth of the family Hepialidae. It is known from Suriname.
