= Cibyra ferruginosa =

Scientific classification
- Kingdom: Animalia
- Phylum: Arthropoda
- Class: Insecta
- Order: Lepidoptera
- Family: Hepialidae
- Genus: Cibyra
- Species: C. ferruginosa

Binomial name
- Cibyra ferruginosa Walker, 1856

Synonyms
- Cibyra ferruginea Kirby, 1892; Cibyra dormita Schaus, 1901

Species of moth

Cibyra ferruginosa is a species of moth of the family Hepialidae. It was described by Francis Walker in 1856 and is known to live in the northeastern region of Brazil.

The wingspan is about 40–68 mm. The forewings are reddish brown shaded with grey on the basal half of the inner margin and within the outer line. There is an oblique darker shade from the base of the subcostal area to the middle of the inner margin. The outer line is dark grey, shaded with lighter grey, and followed by a reddish-brown shade. There are subterminal greyish spots between the veins, as well as some silvery-white spots outlined with black. The hindwings are blackish brown with a light-brown outer margin.
