= Cibyra thisbe =

Scientific classification
- Domain: Eukaryota
- Kingdom: Animalia
- Phylum: Arthropoda
- Class: Insecta
- Order: Lepidoptera
- Family: Hepialidae
- Genus: Cibyra
- Species: C. thisbe

Binomial name
- Cibyra thisbe (H. Druce, 1901)

Synonyms
- Dalaca thisbe H. Druce, 1901; Dalaca hemichrysea Pfitzner, 1937

Species of moth

Cibyra thisbe is a species of moth of the family Hepialidae. It is known from Colombia.
