= Cibyra assa =

Scientific classification
- Domain: Eukaryota
- Kingdom: Animalia
- Phylum: Arthropoda
- Class: Insecta
- Order: Lepidoptera
- Family: Hepialidae
- Genus: Cibyra
- Species: C. assa

Binomial name
- Cibyra assa (H. Druce, 1887)

Synonyms
- Dalaca assa H. Druce, 1887

Species of moth

Cibyra assa is a species of moth of the family Hepialidae. It is known from Guatemala.
