= Charles Muturi =

- Bishop of Mount Kenya South
- Church: Anglican Church of Kenya
- Diocese: Mount Kenya South
- Installed: 2019
- Other post: Suffragan Bishop of Mount Kenya South (2010–2019)

Charles Muturi is an Anglican bishop in Kenya: he was the Suffragan Bishop of Mount Kenya South from 2010 to 2019 when he was elected the diocesan.
