= Cibyra oreas =

Scientific classification
- Domain: Eukaryota
- Kingdom: Animalia
- Phylum: Arthropoda
- Class: Insecta
- Order: Lepidoptera
- Family: Hepialidae
- Genus: Cibyra
- Species: C. oreas

Binomial name
- Cibyra oreas (Schaus, 1892)

Synonyms
- Dalaca oreas Schaus, 1892

Species of moth

Cibyra oreas is a species of moth of the family Hepialidae. It is known to reside in Brazil.
