= Cibyra exclamans =

Scientific classification
- Domain: Eukaryota
- Kingdom: Animalia
- Phylum: Arthropoda
- Class: Insecta
- Order: Lepidoptera
- Family: Hepialidae
- Genus: Cibyra
- Species: C. exclamans

Binomial name
- Cibyra exclamans (Herrich-Schaffer, [1854])

Synonyms
- Epialus exclamans Herrich-Schaffer, [1854]

Species of moth

Cibyra exclamans is a species of moth of the family Hepialidae. It is known from Brazil.
