= Cibyra simplex =

Scientific classification
- Kingdom: Animalia
- Phylum: Arthropoda
- Class: Insecta
- Order: Lepidoptera
- Family: Hepialidae
- Genus: Cibyra
- Species: C. simplex

Binomial name
- Cibyra simplex (Viette, 1956)

Synonyms
- Schaefferiana simplex Viette, 1956

Species of moth

Cibyra simplex is a species of moth of the family Hepialidae. It is known from Brazil.
