= Julius Karanu Gicheru =

Anglican bishop of Murang'a South in Kenya

Julius Karanu Gicheru is an Anglican bishop in Kenya: since 2014 he has been the inaugural Bishop of Murang'a South. He is the first Bishop of the said Diocese which was curved from the Diocese of Mt Kenya Central.
