= Gideon Holgate =

English cricketer

Gideon Holgate (23 June 1839 – 11 July 1895) was an English first-class cricketer, who played twelve matches for Yorkshire County Cricket Club, and several more for Lancashire between 1865 and 1867. Although there are several players who have done this, Holgate is unusual because he played for the two rivals in consecutive seasons.

Born in Sawley near Barnoldswick, now in Lancashire but then in Yorkshire, Holgate was a wicket-keeper, standing 5 ft. 7 inches tall and weighing 11 stone, he took 24 catches and completed 10 stumpings. He scored 455 runs as a right-handed middle order batsman, at an average of 13.78, with a top score of 65 against Surrey.

A professional, his first match for Lancashire was the County Club's second ever game against Birkenhead Park, at Birkenhead, on 15 and 16 July 1864. Batting at number 10 he scored 10 and a duck, took a catch and made a stumping. The following year he was playing for Yorkshire. In 1866, he played for both counties, as he did in the following year, when he played for Lancashire against Yorkshire on 20–22 June at Whalley, in the first Roses Match. By September in the third match between the two counties, at Middlesbrough, he played for Yorkshire.

He played for both counties again the following year, and in 1868 took a season playing for the United England Eleven, playing against local twenty-twos, and in other matches against odds.

He played for Accrington Cricket Club and was one of that Club's early captains. Holdgate died in July 1895 in Accrington.

His grandson, also Gideon, was secretary of the Lancashire League from February 1935 until his death, at his home in Clitheroe, on 16 November 1949. Academic and musician Kathy Hampson (born 1966) is also a distant relative.
