= Gideon Tomaschoff =

Israeli-Canadian abstract painter (born c. 1956)

Gideon Tomaschoff גדעון טומשקוף
- Born: 1956 (age 69–70); Jerusalem, Israel
- Education: BFA Ontario College of Art & Design
- Known for: Abstract painter

Gideon Tomaschoff (Hebrew: גדעון טומשקוף; born c. 1956) is an Israeli-Canadian abstract painter. He lives and works in Toronto, Ontario, Canada.

== Background ==
Tomaschoff was born in Tel Aviv, Israel. He studied Engineering at the Ben Gurion University in Tel Aviv from 1978 to 1982. In 1986 his family moved to the United States and then to Canada. He began in 1993 to study art at the Ontario College of Art & Design, graduating in 1996. He received the Ontario Arts Council grant for emerging artists in 1998. His art is curated by Julie M. Gallery in Toronto.

== Work ==
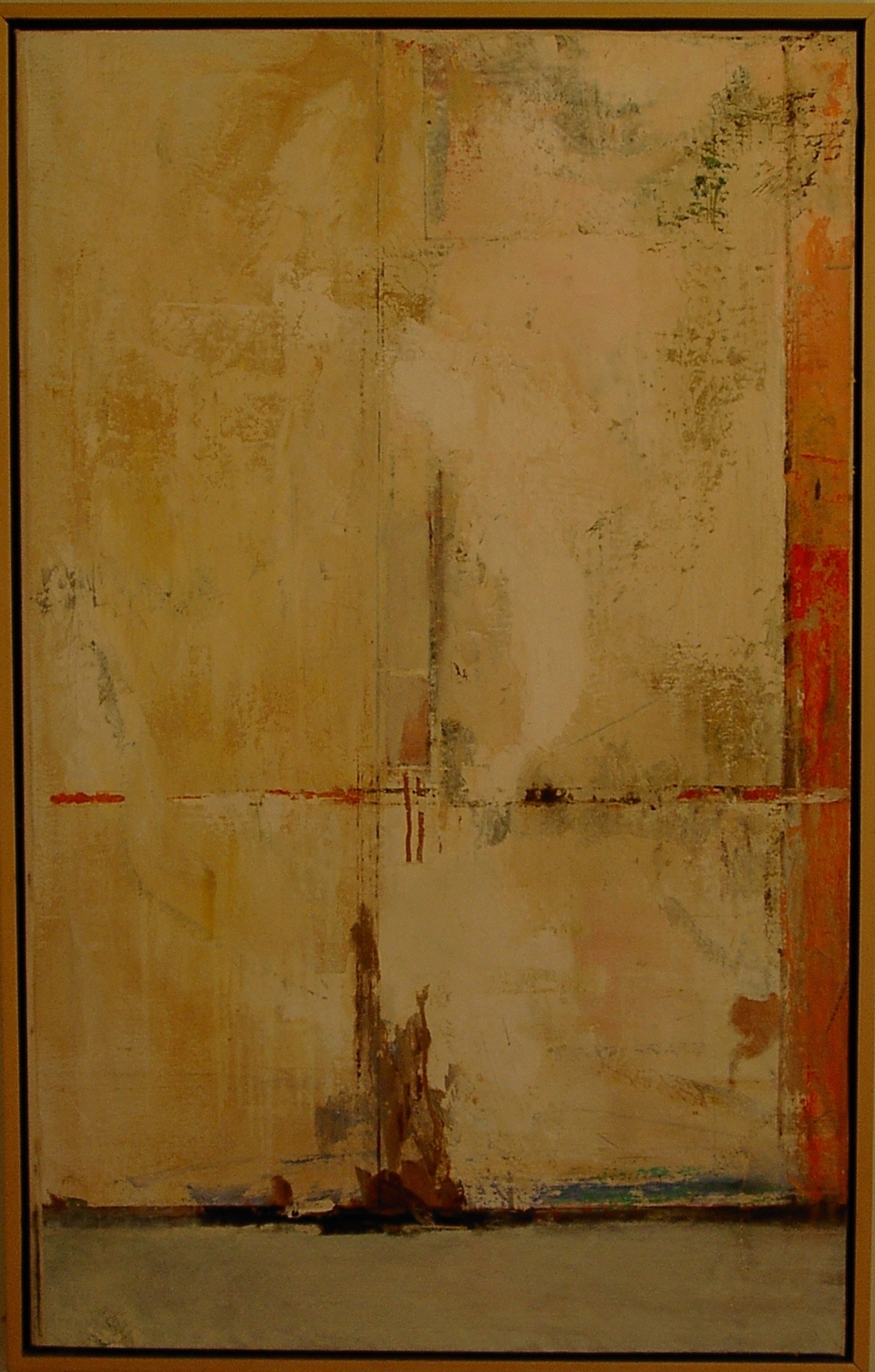
Transitions, by Gideon Tomaschoff (1998), oil on canvas

Tomaschoff's main work is in Abstract painting, working mainly with oil on canvas. Based on his travels through central and South America, he takes images based on building facades and transforms them from crumbling walls to a narrative that is reminiscent of landscapes. His artist's statement reflects these ideas:

"Aging city walls, used and worn, in which countless lives have been led, countless feet have passed by, and countless cycles of nature's elements have left their signature, are the inspiration for my work."

Some titles of his work include "Everything and Nothing", "Intimate Distance", "Imperceptibly" or "Grooves" which attempt to keep the viewer open to interpreting his works. "Transitions" (pictured) proposes that the wall is less a relic of the past but has its own history or narrative.

Tomaschoff primes his canvasses in a manner that ensures the flow and absorption of the colors. After priming the painter puts layer upon layer both transparent and non-transparent colors on the canvas. In a subsequent working process, the coated layers are partially removed, roughened, partially destroyed. The radical treatment of the surface so exposes including color layers lying. Together with the action of natural or artificial light creates a wealth of visual impressions.

== Exhibitions ==
A list of selected exhibitions.

- Traceless, Edward Day Gallery, Toronto (1999)
- Sojourns, Newzones Gallery, Calgary (2004)
- Odon Wagner Gallery, 2006
- Cohen Rese Gallery, San Francisco, 2007

Reece Gallery

- Odon Wagner Gallery, 2009
- Julie M Gallery, Tel Aviv 2010
- Odon Wagner Gallery, 2012
- Interstices - The Space Between, Mönchengladbach, Germany (2011)
- Rooted in Destruction, Julie M Gallery, Toronto (2013)
