= Ghana Export Promotion Authority =

Ghanaian administrative agency

- Abbreviation: GEPA
- Formation: 1969
- Headquarters: Accra, Ghana
- Official language: English
- Website: https://www.gepaghana.org/

Ghana Exports Promotion Authority is a state organization with the mandate to develop, facilitate and promote Ghanaian exports.

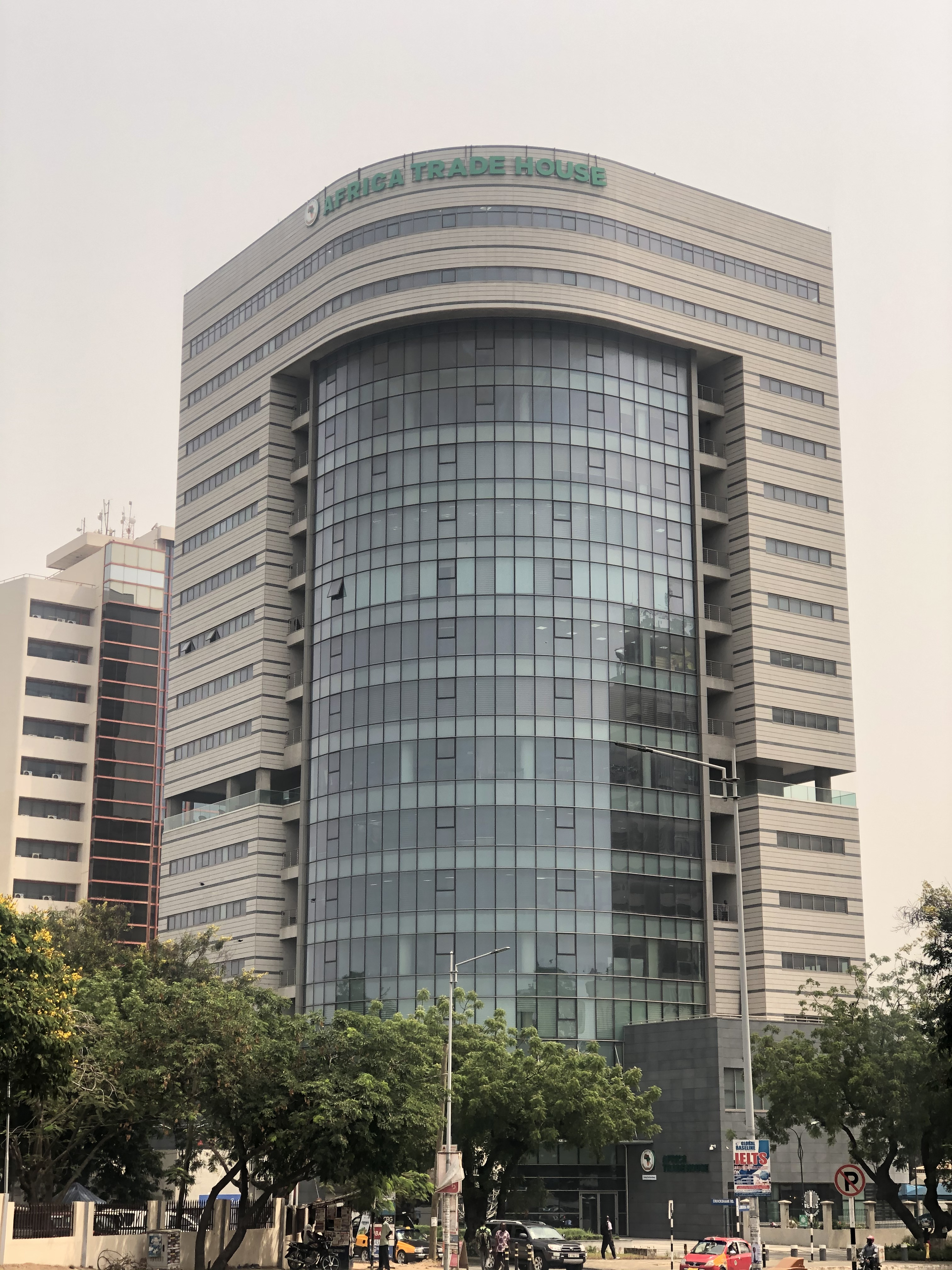
The Head Office of Ghana Export Promotion Authority housed in the Africa Trade House.

== Establishment ==
The institution was established in 1969 by Act 369 as an agency of the Ministry of Trade and Industry.

== Structure ==
GEPA headquarters are in Accra, with regional offices in Ho, Tamale, Koforidua, Bolgatanga, Takoradi, Cape Coast and Kumasi. The GEPA consist of multiple divisions:

- Agri-business and Product Development Division
- Marketing and Promotion Division
- Industrial Arts and Crafts Division
- Research and Information Division
- Finance Division
- Administration and Human Resource Division
- Information Technology and Multimedia Division
- Services and Manufactures Division

== GEPA Philadelphia ==
Ghana Expert Promotion Authority opens Ghana Trade House in Philadelphia to deeping commercial footprint in the USA. The Philadelphia facility will add to the Ghana growing network overseas Trade Houses. It adds up to the similar one opened in London earlier this year and in Kenya in 2023.

Speaking at the inauguration ceremony, the Chief Executive Officer, Francis Kojo Kwarteng Arthur, Esq noted to have said, “Today, we formally establish our flagship Export Trade House here in Philadelphia, and as Ghana remains one of Africa’s most compelling destinations for doing business and investment, we are here to make entering global markets as smooth and achievable as possible."

=== At ECOWAS ===
The Ghana export promotion authority participated in the 2025 ECOWAS Trade and Investment Forum and Exhibition. This exhibition had about 39 local businesses showcased their products in Lagos After engaging some exhibitors from Ghana, the High Commissioner to Nigeria, H.E Baba Jamal adviced Ghanaian businesses to be more proactive in making their products known to the fast changing digital era.

He further stated that "We have so many products we want the world to see, we have other innovations we can share with the world, many countries in the world are going electronic, it is also important we Ghanaians also adopt that system and be relevant on the competitive market.”
