= Gideon Bickel =

Israeli businessman

- גדעון ביקל
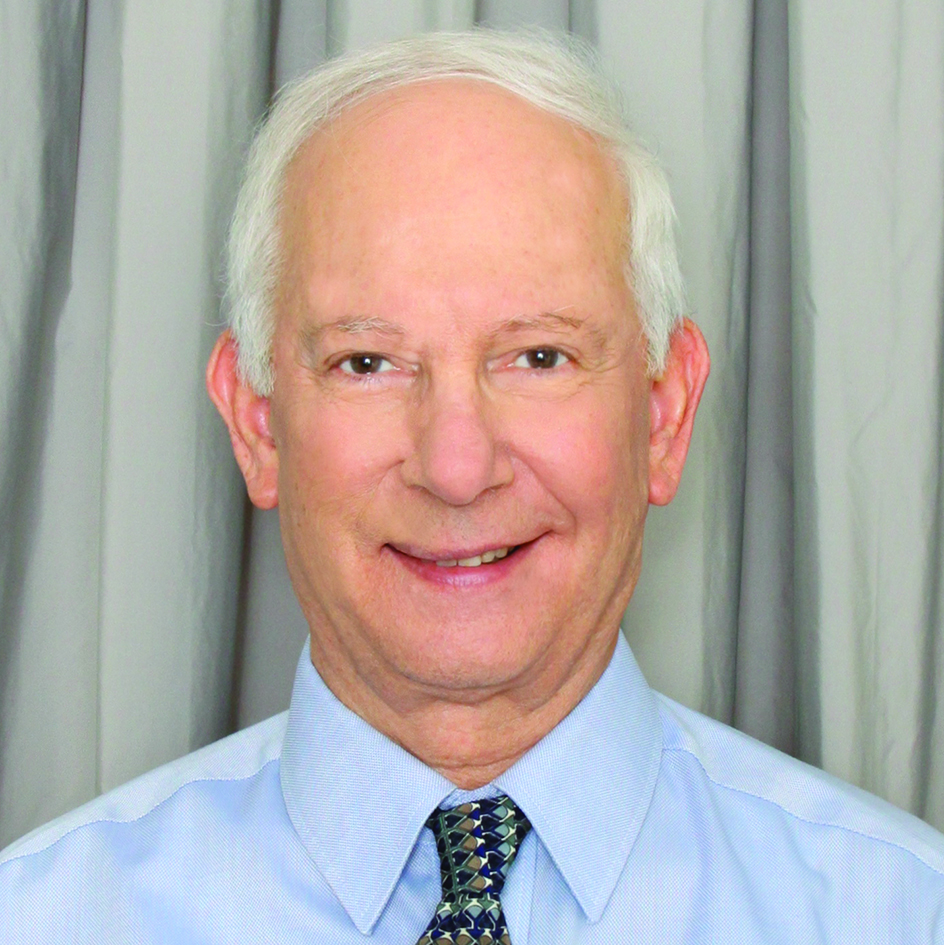

Gideon Bickel (Hebrew: גדעון ביקל) is an Israeli businessman. Bickel was the owner of Flora Stock Exchange in Belgium. He was chairman and owner of Carmel Agrexco.

== Biography ==
Bickel finished undergraduate studies in agronomy at the Hebrew University. He has several master degrees, and he holds a doctorate in social sciences from the University of Haifa. In addition, he graduated the National Security College with honors.

Bickel is a retired colonel (in reserve duty) in the IDF, a commander in the paratroopers and was wounded in Six-Day War during the break to Jerusalem. He served in Yom Kippur War and in the first Lebanon war, in 1982.

== Career ==
Bickel began his business career in 1968 as a farmer and exporter of agricultural produce. In 1997 acquired Flora, the flower exchange in Belgium, which was sold after six years of operation to a Belgian shopping center. In 2011, Bickel purchased Agrexco, an agricultural export company. Under his directorship, the company was renamed Carmel Agrexco.

Bickel is the owner of Hadarim, a shopping mall in Netanya.
