= Gideon Gorrequer =

Anglo-French soldier

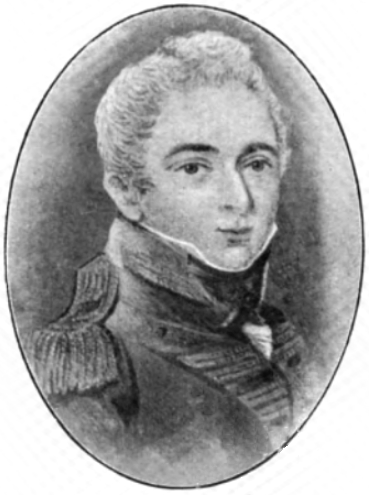
- Born: c. 1780; Saint Brélade, Jersey
- Died: 18 July 1841; London, England
- Resting place: Kensal Green Cemetery
- Occupation: Soldier

Lt. Col. Gideon Gorrequer KH (c. 1780 – 18 July 1841) was an Anglo-French soldier who is best known for serving as the aide-de-camp and acting military secretary to Sir Hudson Lowe during the exile of Napoleon upon St. Helena, and for the diary that he kept whilst in this position.

== Early life ==
The Philippes de Gorrequer family came to Jersey in the mid-18th century. They were originally a family with Huguenot stock from Brittany. The Philippes family had lived near Plouvien for a number of years.

== Career ==
Gorrequer joined the army at 16 as an ensign in the 18th Foot in 1797, and was subsequently promoted to lieutenant in 1798, captain in 1804, brevet-major in 1814, and lieutenant-colonel in 1826.

Gorrequer first came into contact with Sir Hudson Lowe whilst serving in Sicily and the Ionian Islands. When Lowe was appointed as the Governor of St. Helena, he offered Gorrequer the position of aide-de-camp and acting military secretary. Gorrequer accepted this position and arrived on St. Helena in the Phaeton on 14 April 1816.

He was made a Knight of the Royal Hanoverian and Guelphic Order for his services.

== Diary ==
For many years Gorrequer's papers, including his diary, were kept locked in the Court of Chancery, until they were finally made available in 1958.

== Death ==
Gorrequer died suddenly whilst walking in Jermyn Street on 18 July 1841. He is buried at Kensal Green Cemetery.
