= Gideon Telpaz =

Israeli author

Gideon Telpaz (Hebrew: גדעון טלפז) was the nom de plume of Gideon Goldenberg, (26 August 1936 – 30 April 2017), an Israeli author. He wrote in Hebrew. Telpaz's first story, published in 1955, was followed by more than a hundred others over the years. His stories have appeared in most of the literary supplements and magazines in Israel and many are included in his six published collections or short stories. He also published nine novels and was an editor of the Oxford English Hebrew dictionary published by the Oxford University Press.

He was born in 1936 in Petah Tikva to Mr. and Mrs Jacob Goldenberg.

In 1993, a book reviewer for the Jerusalem Post wrote that Telpaz was, "respected as a literary craftsman though not a very well known writer."

Translations of Telpaz's stories into English have appeared in Partisan Review, Iowa Review, The Massachusetts Review, New Virginia Review, Reporter Magazine, Midstream, Present Tense, Short Story International, Hadassah Magazine, and The Jewish Chronicle. His stories have been also published in Arabic, Russian, French, and Serbian. Among the prizes he was awarded for his work are The Prime Minister's Prize, ACUM Prize, Valenrod Prize, Anne Frank Prize, New York Council of the Arts, and New Virginia Review Prize.

Telpaz earned bachelor's and master's degrees from Hebrew University of Jerusalem and a D.Phil. from Oxford University. He taught in various universities in the United States, mostly in the University of Wisconsin, at Madison, and in the Tel Aviv University, Israel. He was invited as a resident writer to the International Writing program at the University of Iowa and to Yarnton Manor (Oxford) and to the following artist's colonies: in the USA to Yaddo, MacDowell, Virginia Center for the Creative Arts, Ragdale, Blue Mountain Center, Millay Colony, the Djerassi Resident Artists Program, and Ledig House OMI. Outside the USA, Altos de Chavon (Dominican Republic), Hawthornden Castle (Scotland), and Le Chateau De Lavigny (Switzerland).

Gideon Telpaz also wrote for radio, television, and the stage.

Shehunat Hap (English translation: "Grabtown") a collection of Telpaz's stories set in "sleepy Petah Tikva" during the British Mandate, was published in 1996, with a new edition published in 1993.
