= Cibyra magua =

Scientific classification
- Domain: Eukaryota
- Kingdom: Animalia
- Phylum: Arthropoda
- Class: Insecta
- Order: Lepidoptera
- Family: Hepialidae
- Genus: Cibyra
- Species: C. magua

Binomial name
- Cibyra magua (Pfitzner, 1937)

Synonyms
- Philaenia magua Pfitzner, 1937

Species of moth

Cibyra magua is a species of moth of the family Hepialidae. It is known from Peru.
