= Sospeter Magua =

Kenyan Anglican bishop (died 2019)

Sospeter Magua was an Anglican bishop in Kenya during the last quarter of the Twentieth Century.

Magua was educated at St. Paul's University, Limuru and was ordained deacon in 1953 and priest in 1955. He served in the Anglican Diocese of Mombasa until 1961. He was archdeacon of Fort Hall from 1964 to 1971; vicar general of the Anglican Diocese of Mount Kenya from 1971 to 1973; and Provincial Secretary of Kenya from 1973 to 1976. He was Bishop of Mount Kenya South from 1976 to 1982.

Magua died at Muranga in December 1982 through a fatal road accident.
