= Gideon King =

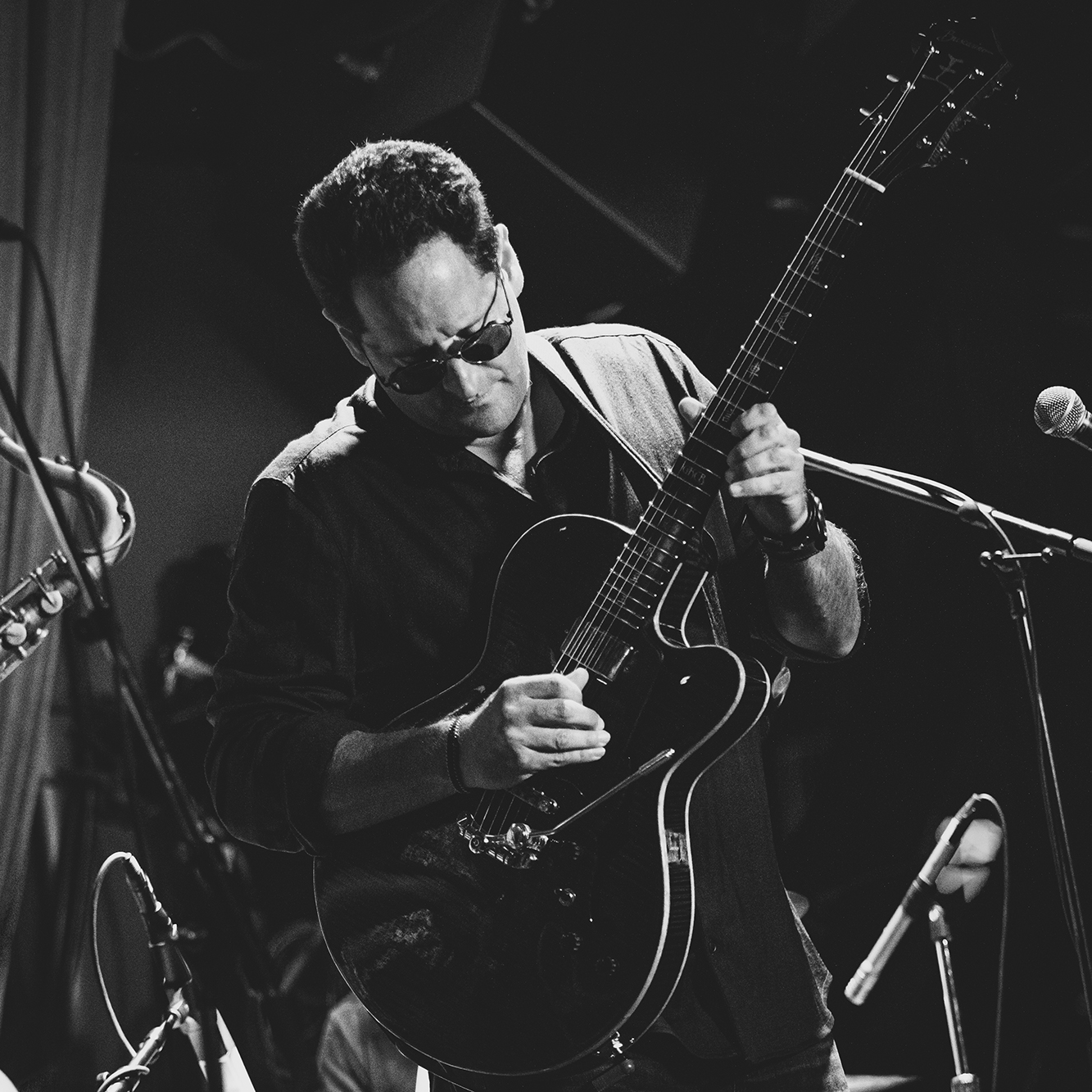

Background information
- Origin: New York, New York, United States
- Genres: Jazz-Rock, Fusion
- Occupations: Businessman, Musician
- Instrument: Guitar
- Website: gideonkingcityblog.com

Gideon King is an American businessman, art pop and jazz fusion musician. He is best known for his role as the CEO of Loeb King Capital Management. He is also a founding partner at Off Road Capital. King is the founder of Gideon King & City Blog, a critically acclaimed act.

== Career ==
King worked as CEO, CIO, analyst and principal of Loeb King Capital Management between 1994 and 2015. He was also a frequent guest on CNBC and Bloomberg Television. He was frequently praised for his shareholder activism. During the 2008 financial crisis and the Great Recession, Institutional Investor remarked on his strong track record and risk management.

He is a founding partner of Off Road Capital. After leading a financing round for North American Helium Inc. in 2020, Gideon King joined their board of directors.

The CFA Society of New York has praised King for his, "Vast experience in a variety of areas, including global public and private assets, DIP Loans, trade claims, banks debt, arcane debt-linked and equity-linked instruments, public special situations and risk-arbitrage, litigation investments and vehicles, activist investments, SPACs, options, and other derivatives."

== Music ==
Gideon King is also a guitarist. He started to play at the age of 10. In 2015 he formed the Art Pop band Gideon King & City Blog, and created a studio project inspired by John Scofield, Pat Metheny and Steely Dan. Later that same year he wrote and released City Blog, the bands' critically acclaimed debut. He has worked with jazz and pop musicians including, John Scofield, James Genus, Marc Broussard, Donny McCaslin, Carolyn Leonhart, Grace Weber and Elliott Skinner.

The Huffington Post reviewed City Blog writing, "An aurally rich group filled with sophisticated musicality, their newest self-titled album is full of vibrant arrangements, edgy lyrics, and chilled-out vibes." This was echoed by Music Crowns who raved that the record "oozes pure class." Praise was not universal though, with Sputnikmusic saying, "there are a few tracks that should have been left off." The reviewer did go on to say, "despite this, Gideon King and City Blog's self titled debut is jam packed with a little something for every music fan."

In 2018, Gideon King & City Blog released their sophomore album, "Upscale Madhouse" featuring John Scofield, Marc Broussard, Elliott Skinner, Grace Weber, Brendan Fletcher, James Genus, Conrad Sewell, Donny McCaslin, Kate Kay Es, Sonny Step and more. His band Gideon King & City Blog released the EP Love Knot which Goldmine called, "both sophisticated and accessible." Meanwhile Arts Fuse praised the record for, "transcending the acute realities surrounding our lives, instead choosing to strike the listener in the solar plexus with sharply written songs."

== Discography ==
- Revisiting Spaces (2011)
- Gideon King Standard Studies: Stella By Starlight (2013)
- 2:14 AM (2013)
- Gentrification (2013)
- Saul Kurtz In Collaboration With Gideon King (2013)
- Gideon King Standard Studies: My Funny Valentine (2014)
- City Blog (2015)
- Upscale Madhouse (2018)
- Lady of a Thousand Sorries (2019)
- Audience of One (2019)
- Love Knot (2020)
