= Gideon Quarcoo =

Ghanaian deputy minister

Deputy Minister for Communications
- In office 2009–2012
- President: John Atta-Mills
- Minister: Haruna Iddrisu

Personal details
- Education: Achimota School; Accra Academy; Emerson College
- Profession: Management Consultant

Gideon Quarcoo is a Ghanaian politician. He was the Deputy Minister for Communications of Ghana from 2009 to 2012, and the chief executive officer of the Ghana Export Promotions Authority from 2013 to 2016.

== Education ==
Quarcoo obtained his Ordinary-level certificate from Achimota School in 1967, and his Advanced-level certificate from the Accra Academy in 1969. He studied communication at Emerson University, Boston, where he was awarded his bachelor's degree in 1980, graduating as the Emersonian Valedictorian for the Emerson Class of 1980.

== Career ==
Quarcoo began as a Management Development consultant at Liberty Mutual Insurance Company in Boston in 1981. He later joined Provant / J. Howard & Associates in Lexington as a Curriculum and Development Consultant in 1997. He later returned to Ghana where he gained employment as the chief executive officer of Midezor Consult Limited, a management consultancy. In 2009, he was appointed Deputy Minister for Communications in the erstwhile Mills government. He worked in this capacity until 2012. In 2013, he was appointed chief executive officer of the Ghana Export Promotions Authority by Ghanaian president John Mahama. He served in this position until 2016 when he was succeeded by James Zugah Tiigah.

== Personal life ==
Quarcoo is married with one daughter and three sons.
