= Cibyra danieli =

Scientific classification
- Kingdom: Animalia
- Phylum: Arthropoda
- Class: Insecta
- Order: Lepidoptera
- Family: Hepialidae
- Genus: Cibyra
- Species: C. danieli

Binomial name
- Cibyra danieli (Viette, 1961)

Synonyms
- Aepytus danieli Viette, 1961

Species of moth

Cibyra danieli is a species of moth of the family Hepialidae. It is known from Brazil.
