= Cibyra zischkai =

Scientific classification
- Kingdom: Animalia
- Phylum: Arthropoda
- Class: Insecta
- Order: Lepidoptera
- Family: Hepialidae
- Genus: Cibyra
- Species: C. zischkai

Binomial name
- Cibyra zischkai (Viette, 1961)

Synonyms
- Aepytus zischkai Viette, 1961

Species of moth

Cibyra zischkai is a species of moth of the family Hepialidae. It is known from Bolivia.
