= Cibyra monoargenteus =

Scientific classification
- Kingdom: Animalia
- Phylum: Arthropoda
- Class: Insecta
- Order: Lepidoptera
- Family: Hepialidae
- Genus: Cibyra
- Species: C. monoargenteus

Binomial name
- Cibyra monoargenteus (Viette, 1951)

Synonyms
- Aepytus monoargenteus Viette, 1951

Species of moth

Cibyra monoargenteus is a species of moth of the family Hepialidae. It is found in Brazil.
