= Gideon Gee-Bum Kim =

Gideon Gee-Bum Kim 김기범 (Kim Gee-Bum)
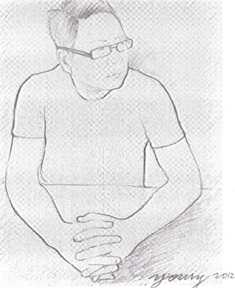

Background information
- Born: September 12, 1964 (age 62); Seoul, South Korea
- Occupation: Composer
- Website: www.musiccentre.ca/composer/61943/

Gideon Gee-Bum Kim (Korean: 김기범, born September 12, 1964) is a Korean-Canadian classical music composer, conductor, and music educator and founder of the Toronto Messiaen Ensemble. His music draws on his Christian faith and shows a connection of the rich musical heritage of Korea and new compositional techniques, especially in the field of heterophony texture and all of this with live and emotional imagination.

== Life ==
Born in Seoul, South Korea, Gideon Gee-Bum Kim received his B.A. in music composition from Seoul National University and his M.A. and Ph.D. in music composition from the University of Pennsylvania. His mentors included George Crumb, Mark Kopytman and Young-ja Lee. Crumb described him as a composer who shows great originality in use of rhythm and harmony, and possesses a fine melodic gift.

As a numerous awards and honors winning composer, Kim's works have been performed regularly in concert halls, festivals and music worships in Europe, North America and Asia by many leading soloists, ensembles and orchestras. Kim is a former associate professor in music composition at Kyungwon University and currently is an associate composer of the Canadian Music Centre which has highlighted his music since he moved to Canada in 2004. In 2000, Kim was a Distinguished Composer-In-Residence at the Colorado College that honored him with all-Kim concert of performances of various chambers and solo. In 2011, Kim founded the Toronto Messiaen Ensemble, a Canadian chamber ensemble dedicated to the performance of classical and contemporary music. The goal of the ensemble is to express a positive and hopeful message through music and Kim is serving as artistic director of the ensemble. In 2015, he also became the music director of the Yemel Philharmonic Society in Toronto.

As a long-standing partner of Jerusalem Kaprizma Ensemble, Kim's works have been performed and recorded by the ensemble and are available for listening and downloading at the ensemble's Internet Archive. His music has published by Ye-Dang Press and can be heard on Sony Classical, Synnara Music and Sung Eum Limited labels.

=== Awards and honors ===
Kim was the winner of the first prize at the 1993 Moldavian International Composition Contest with Im for soprano, two flutes, viola, cello and pak. Kim's Song of the Heavens and Firmament for piano trio was awarded the grand prize at the 1993 Korean Broadcasting System (KBS) Composition Competition and the 1994 Ye Eum Composition Award from the Ye Eum Culture Foundation. His Symphony No.1, 낯선경험: The Strange Seasons for orchestra won the 1995 Ahn Eak Tae Composition Award from the Ahn Eak Tae Foundation of The Korea Times. In 1998, Kim was honored by South Korea's Ministry of Culture and Tourism as the first composer to receive the Today's Young Artist Award in Music. In 2000, Kim was awarded the International Commission Prize from the Music At The Anthology (MATA) in New York. Kim's awards and honors also included the first prize in composition of the Dong A Music Concours from the Dong A Daily Newspaper, several Creative Arts Awards from the Korean Culture and Arts Foundation, special mention from the New York Treble Singers and selection for the International Gaudeamus Music Week.

== Compositions ==
=== Orchestra music ===
- 낯선경험; The strange Seasons for orchestra (Symphony No. 1), 1994
- Symphony No. 2, 1998, (rev. 2000)
- Still Life with Prayer and Poem for orchestra, 2001
- Forgotten Dance for orchestra, 2008

=== Concertos ===
- Concerto No.1 for piano and orchestra, 1990/1991
- Concerto (Song of Grievous Light) for violin and orchestra, 1995/1996

=== Choir and instruments ===
- Psalm 130 for mixed choir and piano, 1983
- Psalm 150 for mixed choir, oboe, bassoon, timpani and percussion, 2001/2002 (or for mixed choir and organ, 2002)
- Psalm 117 for mixed choir and percussion, 2006

=== Choir a cappella ===
- Three Songs of Ascents (Psalm 123, 128 and 132) for women choir a cappella, 2002 (or for mixed choir a cappella, 2002)

=== Chamber orchestra and large ensemble ===
- Rotation for string orchestra, tam-tam, pak and pyunkyung, 1989
- Psalm 23 for mezzo-soprano and 11 instrumentalists, 1991
- Psalm 84 for flute, clarinet, horn, guitar, percussion, violin, cello and double bass, 2000
- Still Life with Prayer and Poem for gamelan octet, 2000
- Psalm 71 for 4 gayageums (traditional Korean 12-stringed instrument), violin, viola and cello, 2002 (or for 4 guitars, violin, viola and cello, 2003)
- After Ziklag for flute, oboe, horn, percussion, violin, viola, cello and double bass, 2002
- A Message from the Wind and the Water for guitar and chamber orchestra, 2004/2005

=== Vocal chamber music ===
- Love (Im) for soprano, two flutes/alto flute, viola and cello, 1989
- Glorious Things of Thee Are Spoken for vocal quartet, violin, clarinet, cello and piano, 2011

=== Instrumental chamber music ===
- Sonata for cello and piano, 1985
- Soggetto Cavato for string quartet, 1986
- The Natural Sonority for clarinet, violin, piano and two percussionists, 1988
- Sanjo Fantasy for two oboes/English horn, 1990
- Song of the Heavens and Firmament for piano trio, 1992
- String Quartet No.1 (Tan Gum Dae), 1993
- Imulnori I for violin and cello, 1994
- Song of Grievous Light for cello and piano, 1995 (or for flute and piano, 2015)
- Suite for two pianos (Imulnori II), 1996
- String Quartet No. 2, 1996
- Trio for violin, clarinet and piano, 1999
- (Revised in 2013 under the title of Dry Bones Shall Live)
- Ganggangsullae for violin, viola and cello, 1999
- Homage to Mozart (Imulnori III) for two Haegums, 1999
- Blue Bird for amplified flute, tenor saxophone and amplified piano, 2000
- Psalm 142 (Imulnori IV) for two guitars, 2003
- Deux Poèmes for flute and guitar, 2004
- Forgotten Dance for piano, harpsichord and vibraphone, 2006, (or for clarinet, violin, cello and piano, 2007; or for flute, piano, harp and vibraphone, 2008)
- Riddle (Quartet for QAT) for clarinet, violin, cello and piano, 2007
- Before & After the Bath for flute and guitar, 2009
- Impromptu on the theme of Korean folk tune, Doraji for flute and piano, 2015

=== Piano and organ solo ===
- Sonata for piano, 1985
- Rhapsody for piano, 1987
- Capriccio for piano, 1994
- Psalm 150 for organ, 2002

=== Other instruments solo ===
- Julnori I for violin,1996
- Julnori II for Haegum (Korean traditional 2-stringed instrument), 1998
- Theme and Five Variations for guitar, 2006/2007

=== Arrangements ===
- Father In Heaven, How We Love You (mixed choir and piano, 2005, rev. 2012)
- Nobody Knows the Trouble I've Seen (mixed choir, piano and organ, 2006)
- My Love Toward Lord (mixed choir, violin and piano 2006
- By the Love of the Lord (mixed choir, violin/cello and piano, 2006)(or mixed choir, violin, clarinet, cello and piano, 2011)
- More About Jesus Would I Know (mixed choir and piano, 2007)
- When the Spirit of the Lord (mixed choir and piano/organ, 2009)(or mixed choir, violin, clarinet, cello and piano/organ, 2011)
- For Another Fruit (mixed chorus and piano, 2009)
- When I Meditate His Holiness (mixed chorus and piano, 2009)
- During Whole My Life (mixed choir and piano, 2009)
- He Binds the Broken-hearted (mixed choirs and piano, 2010)(or mixed choir, violin, clarinet, cello and piano, 2011)
- You Raise Me Up (violin, clarinet, cello and piano, 2012)
- Jesus Loves Me (children duet, soprano, tenor, violin, clarinet, piano and organ, 2013)
- Amazing Grace (soprano, mixed choir, violin, clarinet, cello and piano, 2013)
- Amazing Grace (mixed choir, cello and piano, 2013)
