= Cibyra helga =

Scientific classification
- Domain: Eukaryota
- Kingdom: Animalia
- Phylum: Arthropoda
- Class: Insecta
- Order: Lepidoptera
- Family: Hepialidae
- Genus: Cibyra
- Species: C. helga

Binomial name
- Cibyra helga (Schaus, 1929)

Synonyms
- Aepytus helga Schaus, 1929

Species of moth

Cibyra helga is a species of moth of the family Hepialidae. It is known from Brazil.
