= Cibyra guyanensis =

Scientific classification
- Kingdom: Animalia
- Phylum: Arthropoda
- Class: Insecta
- Order: Lepidoptera
- Family: Hepialidae
- Genus: Cibyra
- Species: C. guyanensis

Binomial name
- Cibyra guyanensis (Viette, 1951)

Synonyms
- Aepytus guyanensis Viette, 1951

Species of moth

Cibyra guyanensis is a species of moth of the family Hepialidae. It is known from French Guiana.
