= Allan Waithaka =

Allan Waithaka is an Anglican bishop in Kenya: he has been an Assistant Bishop in the Anglican Diocese of Mount Kenya Central since 2002.
