= Gideon Hudson =

English cricketer

Personal information
- Full name: Gideon Dacre Hudson
- Born: 8 November 1944 (age 82); Salisbury, Wiltshire, England
- Batting: Right-handed
- Role: Wicket-keeper

Domestic team information
- Years: Team
- 1964–1975: Buckinghamshire
- 1964: Oxford University

Career statistics
Competition	First-class
Matches	1
Runs scored	6
Batting average	3.00
100s/50s	–/–
Top score	6
Balls bowled	–
Wickets	–
Bowling average	–
5 wickets in innings	–
10 wickets in match	–
Best bowling	–
Catches/stumpings	2/–
- Source: Cricinfo, 27 June 2011

Gideon Dacre Hudson (born 8 November 1944) is a former English cricketer. Hudson was a right-handed batsman who fielded as a wicket-keeper. He was born in Salisbury, Wiltshire.

In 1964, Hudson made his only first-class appearance for Oxford University against Worcestershire. In this match, he was dismissed for a duck by Jim Standen in the Oxford first innings, while in the second innings he was dismissed for 6 runs by Doug Slade. Behind the stumps, Hudson took two catches in Worcestershire's first innings. Hudson also made his debut for Buckinghamshire in the 1964 Minor Counties Championship against Suffolk. He played for Buckinghamshire in 1964 and 1966, before appearing once each in 1974 and 1975. In total he made 14 appearances for the county.

Outside of cricket, Hudson has worked as a solicitor and company director.
