= Gideon Harvey =

Physician and medical author (1636–1702)

Gideon Harvey the Elder
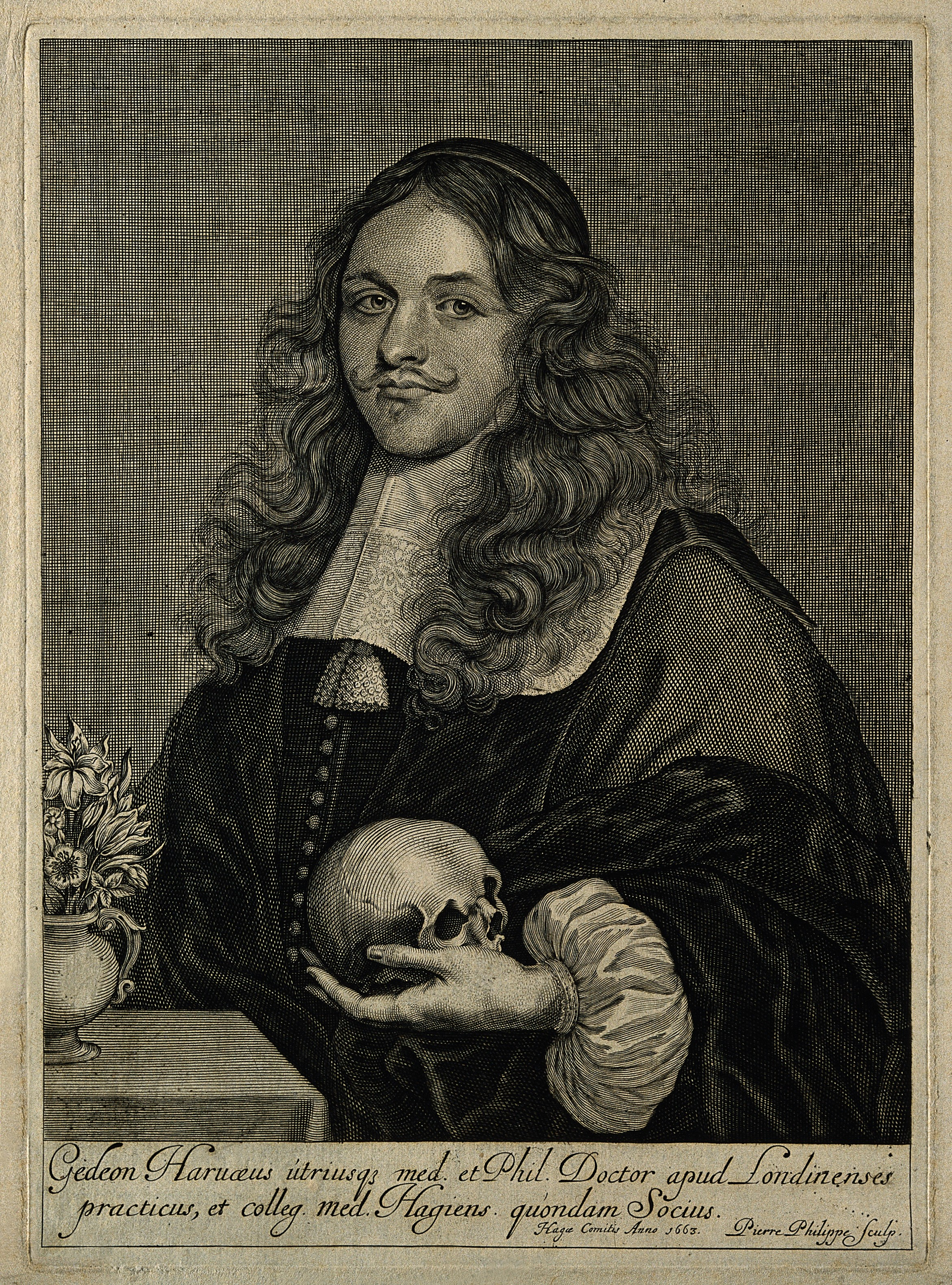
- Line engraving by P. Philippe (1663)
- Born: c. 1636–1640; Holland, Dutch Republic
- Died: c. 1700–1702; London, England
- Education: Exeter College, Oxford; Leyden University
- Scientific career
- Fields: Physician

Gideon Harvey (c. 1636–1640 – c. 1700–1702) was a Dutch-English physician.

== Life ==
=== Education ===
Gideon Harvey, born in Holland probably between 1630 and 1640, was the son of John and Elizabeth Harvey, as evidenced by his petition for denization in 1660. (Note: Calendar of State Papers, Domestic Series, 1660–1) According to his own account (in Casus Medico-Chirurgicus) he learned Greek and Latin in the Low Countries, and on 31 May 1655 matriculated at Exeter College, Oxford, then under the rule of the energetic Dr. Conant, where he studied philosophy. On 4 January 1657 he was admitted to Leyden, where he studied medicine, anatomy, and botany, and also attended the hospital practice of Professor van der Linden. At the same time, he says, he learned chemistry from a German, and was instructed by a surgeon and an apothecary in their respective arts. Apparently, he went to Paris in the same year, where he studied and visited the hospitals. He took his degrees of MB and MD while making le petit tour, probably at a small French university. He was probably very young, but his later boast that he took his final degree in his seventeenth year is an obvious exaggeration.

After completing his studies in Paris he returned to Holland, and was made a fellow of the College of Physicians at The Hague. There seems to be no authority for Wood's statement that he was physician to Charles II when in exile. Harvey was in London during the Interregnum, and on 6 July 1659 was appointed by the Committee of Safety, on the motion of Desborow, to go as physician to Dunkirk. (Note: Calendar of State Papers, Domestic Series, 1659–60, p. 9) Whether he actually went there is not clear, but after the Restoration he appears as physician, or doctor-general, to the King's army in Flanders. Weary of this employment, he resigned, travelled through Germany and Italy, and then settled as a physician in London. He never belonged to the College of Physicians, but was at first on good terms with that body, and spoke of it with great respect in an anonymous pamphlet published in 1670. (Note: see The Accomplisht Physician, &c.)

=== Court physician ===
About 1675 he was appointed physician to Charles II. In 1678 he was called, in consultation with other physicians, to attend a nobleman (Charles, Lord Mohun, father of the more notorious duellist), who had received a wound in a duel from which he eventually died. (Note: Wood, Athenæ Oxonienses ii. 957, ed. 1721.) Harvey, pleading that he had been ordered by the King to write an account of the case, made it the occasion of virulent personal attacks, under assumed names, on the other physicians concerned. (Note: Casus Medico-Chirurgicus.) He was already in disfavour with the profession for some rather discreditable publications on Venereal diseases, and for a book on popular medicine, (Note: The Family Physician, &c) which displeased apothecaries because it revealed the secrets of their trade.

Five years later, in 1683, Harvey published a scurrilous attack on the College of Physicians, entitled The Conclave of Physicians. The scene was supposedly set in Paris, but eminent London physicians were abused in thinly veiled disguise. Charles II, who had a strong predilection for irregular doctors, seems to have in some way anctioned, and perhaps enjoyed, this attack on the institution of which he was the official patron; but from a contemporary pamphlet, (Note: Gideon's Fleece, a poem, 4to, 1684, attributed to Dr. Thomas Guidott, p. 9) it appears that he was believed to have interfered in order to soften the edge of an attack on the illustrious Willis. The pamphlet elicited an anonymous reply, (Note: A Dialogue between Philiater and Momus, 1686) along with the very poor poem Gideon's Fleece. Harvey nevertheless prospered in practice, and although he held no court appointment under James II, he was made, in the first year of William and Mary, "their majesties' physician of the Tower", a lucrative sinecure, which he enjoyed until his death, probably about 1700–2, and in which he was succeeded by his son, Gideon Harvey the Younger.

=== Critical assessment ===
Harvey was a man of some education and a prolific writer, but his works have no scientific value and are marred by personalities as well as by unworthy attempts at popularity. For example, in a book on the venereal disease, he uses the discreditable device of promising a secret remedy, which he does not divulge, superior to those mentioned in the book. His only service to medicine was to ridicule certain old-world preparations, theriaca, mithridatium, and others, traditionally preserved in the London Pharmacopœia, but omitted in the next century. On the other hand, he was a staunch opponent of Peruvian bark. One of his works, a collection of arbitrary criticisms of medical practice, ironically titled The Art of Curing Diseases by Expectation, gained some prominence on the continent, through the patronage of a far greater man, George Ernst Stahl, who published a Latin version with long notes of his own, imbued with a similar scepticism, and in this form it provoked some controversy. Late in life Harvey published a recantation of some of his earlier doctrines, under the title of The Vanities of Philosophy and Physick, a profession of general scepticism mixed with new hypotheses.

Despite their shortcomings, Harvey's works do have the merit of a lively and witty style, although the humour is often very crude. They shed light on the medical customs and personalities of the time and are therefore of some historical value. His portrait was engraved by Pierre Philippe in 1663 for his Archelogia, and appears in a smaller form by A. Hertocks in Morbus Anglicus and other works. He is portrayed as a handsome young man with a look of great self-sufficiency.

=== Works ===
Harvey's writings, all issued in London, were:

1. Archelogia Philosophica Nova, or New Principles of Philosophy containing Philosophy in General, Metaphysicks, &c., 4to, 1663 (with portrait).
2. Discourse of the Plague, 4to, 1665; 2nd edit. 8vo, 1673, with the following:
3. Morbus Anglicus, or the Anatomy of Consumptions, 8vo, 1666; 2nd edit. 1672.
4. The Accomplisht Physician, the honest Apothecary, and the skilful Chyrurgeon, 4to, 1670 (anonymous, but Harvey claims ownership in The Art of Curing Diseases by Expectation, although the work is commonly ascribed to Christopher Merrett).
5. Little Venus Unmasked, 12mo, 1671.
6. Great Venus Unmasked, or a more Exact Discovery of the Venereal Evil, 8vo, 1672 (the two latter appeared in several editions with different titles).
7. De Febribus Tractatus Theoreticus et Practicus, 8vo, 1672; English by J. T., 1674.
8. The Disease of London, or a new Discovery of the Scorvey, 8vo, 1675.
9. The Family Physician and House-apothecary, 12mo, 1676; 2nd edit. 1678.
10. Casus Medico-Chirurgicus, or a most Memorable Case of a Nobleman deceased, 8vo, 1678.
11. The Conclave of Physicians, also a peculiar Discourse of the Jesuit's bark, 12mo, 1683; 2nd edit. 1686.
12. Discourse of the Small Pox and Malignant Fevers, with an exact Discovery of the Scorvey, 12mo, 1685.
13. The Art of Curing Diseases by Expectation, 12mo, 1689; Latin, London, 1694; also edited by Stahl, Ars Sanandi cum Expectatione, Offenbach, 1730; Paris, 1730.
14. Treatise of the Small Pox and Measles, 12mo, 1696.
15. Particular Discourse on Opium, &c., 8vo, 1696.
16. The Vanities of Philosophy and Physick, 8vo, 1699; 3rd edit. 1702.

== Son ==
Gideon Harvey the Younger (c. 1669 – 1754), son of the elder Gideon Harvey, born apparently in London, was also a physician. He is mentioned by his father as a student at Leyden, where he entered on 12 May 1688 to study philosophy. (Note: Art of Curing Diseases by Expectation, p. 224) He graduated MD of that university in 1690, with a dissertation entitled De Febre Ardente. In 1698 he was appointed by royal letters Doctor of Medicine of Cambridge, as a member of Catharine Hall. He was admitted a candidate of the College of Physicians of London, 3 April 1699, and a fellow 22 March 1702–3, and held offices in the college. About 1700–2 he was appointed the King's Physician to the Tower, as it would seem in succession to his father. He died in 1754 or the following year, making him the oldest Fellow of the College. He does not appear to have published anything.

== Bibliography ==
- Payne, Joseph Frank (1891). "Harvey, Gideon" . In Stephen, Leslie; Lee, Sidney (eds.). Dictionary of National Biography. Vol. 25. London: Smith, Elder & Co. pp. 86–87.
- Wallis, Patrick (2004). "Harvey, Gideon (1636/7–1702)". In Oxford Dictionary of National Biography. Oxford: Oxford University Press.
- "Gideon Harvey the Elder", National Portrait Gallery. Accessed 4 March 2022.
