= Wes Gideon =

American gridiron football player (born 1937)

Profile
- Positions: Quarterback, End

Personal information
- Born: February 28, 1937 (age 89); Houston, Texas, U.S.
- Listed height: 6 ft 0 in (1.83 m)
- Listed weight: 290 lb (132 kg)

Career information
- College: Trinity (TX)

Career history
- 1959–1960: Montreal Alouettes
- 1961: Toronto Argonauts

Wes Gideon (born February 28, 1937) is a retired Canadian football player who played for the Montreal Alouettes and Toronto Argonauts. He previously played at Trinity University in San Antonio.
