= Gideon Iitula =

Namibian pastor

Gideon Kagwedha Iitula (b. c. 1887 Amuteya, Onyaana, Ondonga, Ovamboland, Namibia — died 2 January 1971) was one of the first seven Ovambo pastors, whom the director of the Finnish Missionary Society, Matti Tarkkanen ordained into priesthood in Oniipa, Ovamboland, on 27 September 1925, with a permission granted by the Bishop of Tampere, Jaakko Gummerus.

Iitula was born c. 1887 the son of Iitula yIipinge yaNashongo shaKambonde and Amunyela Eva lyaMutota. He was baptized on 25 January 1902. He went to school in Oniipa during 1913–16, and studied in the Oniipa seminary during 1922–25. He worked in Oshigambo as a teacher during 1916–18, and in Uukolonkadhi during 1918–20. As a pastor he worked in Omusitagongalo, Oshigambo, Onesi, Oniipa and Onayena.

Iitula was married twice, first to Helena yaNembundu ca. 1909, and later to Hilda yaFilippus. From the first marriage he had 9 children, from the second two sons and two daughters.

== Sources ==
- Peltola, Matti (1958). Sata vuotta suomalaista lähetystyötä 1859–1959. II: Suomen Lähetysseuran Afrikan työn historia [One Hundred Years of Finnish Missionary Work 1859–1959. II: The History of FMS's Missionary Work in Africa]. Helsinki: The Finnish Missionary Society.
- Pentti, Elias, ed. (1958). Ambomaa [Ovamboland]. Helsinki: Finnish Missionary Society.
