= Henry Paltridge =

Henry Paltridge was an Anglican bishop in Kenya: he was the inaugural Bishop of Meru from 1998 to 2002.

Prior to becoming Bishop he was Vice Principal of Bishop Hannington College. He now lives in New Zealand.
