= Cibyra gugelmanni =

Scientific classification
- Kingdom: Animalia
- Phylum: Arthropoda
- Class: Insecta
- Order: Lepidoptera
- Family: Hepialidae
- Genus: Cibyra
- Species: C. gugelmanni

Binomial name
- Cibyra gugelmanni (Viette, 1950)

Synonyms
- Aepytus gugelmanni Viette, 1950

Species of moth

Cibyra gugelmanni is a species of moth of the family Hepialidae. It is known from Mexico.
