= Gideon Meitlis =

Israeli footballer

Gideon Meitlis גדעון מייטליס
Personal information
- Date of death: 2001

Senior career*
Years	Team	Apps	(Gls)
1958–1968	Maccabi Netanya	165	(0)
- * Club domestic league appearances and goals

Gideon Meitlis (Hebrew: גדעון מייטליס; 1941–2001) was an Israeli footballer.

Gideon Meitlis played for Maccabi Netanya for ten years.

In 2007, he was honored posthumously by Maccabi Netanya. His daughter received the cup in his honor.
