= Gideon Githiga =

Gideon Githiga was an Anglican bishop in Kenya: he was the inaugural Bishop of Thika, and served until 2013.
