= Gideon Cohen =

Israeli footballer and manager

Gideon Cohen גדעון כהן
Personal information
- Full name: Gideon "Gigi" Cohen
- Place of birth: Israel

Managerial career
- Years: Team
- 1983–1985: Maccabi Sha'arayim
- 1997–1998: Maccabi Netanya
- 2000–2001: Maccabi Sha'arayim

Gideon Cohen (Hebrew: גדעון כהן) is a former Israeli footballer and manager who now works for the youth team of Hapoel Marmorek.
