= Gideon Obeng Kyeremeh =

Ghanaian footballer (born 2003)

Personal information
- Date of birth: 14 December 2003 (age 22)
- Position: Forward

Team information
- Current team: BA Stars

Senior career*
Years	Team	Apps	(Gls)
2017–2019	Aduana Stars	4	(1)
2019–2020	Berekum Chelsea		
2020–	BA Stars		
Medal record
Aduana Stars
Winner	Ghana Premier League	2017
- * Club domestic league appearances and goals as of 17:44, 2 March 2021 (UTC)

Gideon Obeng Kyeremeh (born 14 December 2003) is a Ghanaian footballer who currently plays as a forward for Ghana Premier League side BA Stars.

== Club career ==
Obeng Kyeremeh became the youngest player to ever feature in the Ghana Premier League when he made his debut on 6 November 2017 against Berekum Chelsea, aged 13 years, 10 months and 22 days.

== Career statistics ==
=== Club ===
As of 23 July 2018.

Club	Season	League			Cup		Continental		Other		Total	
Club	Season	Division	Apps	Goals	Apps	Goals	Apps	Goals	Apps	Goals	Apps	Goals
Aduana Stars	2017	Ghana Premier League	2	0	0	0	–		0	0	2	0
Aduana Stars	2018	Ghana Premier League	2	1	0	0	1 (Note: Appearances in the CAF Confederation Cup)	0	0	0	3	1
Career total			4	1	0	0	1	0	0	0	5	1
