= Gideon Ireri =

Kenyan Anglican bishop

Gideon Ireri was an Anglican bishop in Kenya. In 1997, he became the inaugural Bishop of Mbeere. and served to 2009.
