= Peter Simiyu =

Anglican bishop

The Right Reverend Colonel Peter Simiyu has been the Bishop of the Anglican Episcopate of the Kenyan Armed Forces since 2009.
