= Episcopate of the Kenyan Armed Forces =

Anglican ecclesiastical jurisdiction Kenya

The Episcopate of the Kenyan Armed Forces is an Anglican See in the Anglican Church of Kenya. Founded in 2009, the current bishop is The Right Reverend Colonel Peter Simiyu.
