= List of people with given name Peter =

This is a list of people named Peter.

== Business ==
- Peter Abeles (1924–1999), Australian businessman
- Peter Ackerman (1946–2022), American businessman
- Peter H. Ammon, American investor and endowment manager
- Peter Amos Siwo (1931–1998), Zambian businessman
- Peter Andronov, Bulgarian financier and banker
- Peter Applebye (1709–1774), Danish industrialist
- Peter Arnell (born 1958), American designer and branding executive
- Peter Arvai (born 1979), Hungarian-Swedish businessman
- Peter Bakare (businessman) (born 1997), Nigerian realtor
- Peter Bakker (born 1961), Dutch businessman
- Peter Ballantine (1791–1883), American businessman
- Peter Bally (1783–1849), Swiss businessman
- Peter Bamford (born 1954), British businessman
- Peter Bartels (born 1941), Australian cyclist and businessman
- Peter Batey (born 1958), British businessman
- Peter Bavasi (born 1942), American baseball executive
- Peter Baxendell (1925–2025), British businessman
- Peter Bazalgette (born 1953), British television executive
- Peter Bellew, Irish businessman
- Peter Bendix (born 1985), American professional baseball executive
- Peter Bent Brigham (1807–1877), American businessman and philanthropist
- Peter Besler (born 1963), Canadian investment advisor and author
- Peter Bezukladnikov, Russian businessman
- Peter Birkett, British educator and entrepreneur
- Peter Birt (c. 1723–c. 1791), British businessman
- Peter Bond, Australian businessman
- Peter Bonfield (born 1944), British businessman
- Peter Borish, American investor and trader
- Peter Borre (1716–1789), Danish merchant
- Peter Bosek (born 1968), Austrian bank manager
- Peter Botten, Australian business executive
- Peter Bottome (1937–2016), Venezuelan businessman
- Peter Brabeck-Letmathe (born 1944), Austrian businessman
- Peter Brack, American entrepreneur and investor
- Peter Brant (born 1947), American businessman
- Peter Bronfman (1929–1996), Canadian businessman and entrepreneur
- Peter Arrell Browne Widener (1834–1915), American businessman
- Peter Burt (1944–2017), Scottish businessman
- Peter Cadbury (1918–2006), English businessman
- Peter F. Carpenter, American philanthropist and former business executive
- Peter William Cassey (1831–1917), American school founder and minister
- Peter Chernin (born 1951), American businessman and investor
- Peter Chou (born 1956), Taiwanese businessman and electronics engineer
- Peter C. Clapman (1936–2021), American investment chief executive
- Peter Coates (born 1938), English businessman
- Peter Cohan, American businessman
- Peter R. Coneway (1944–2020), American investment banker and diplomat
- Peter L. Corsell (born 1977), American technology entrepreneur and investor
- Peter Cowgill (born 1953), British businessman
- Peter Cowley (1955–2024), British businessman
- Peter Cozens, New Zealand finance director
- Peter Cruddas, Baron Cruddas (born 1953), English banker and businessman
- Peter Cullum (born 1950), English businessman
- Peter Cundill (1938–2011), Canadian businessman
- Peter Cuneo, American businessman
- Peter Stormonth Darling (1932–2019), British investment banker
- Peter Dawe (born 1954), British entrepreneur
- Peter de Putron (born 1963), English businessman
- Peter de Ridder (born 1946), Dutch businessman and sailor
- Peter Demens (1850–1919), Russian-American businessman
- Peter Derham (1925–2008), Australian business executive and director
- Peter Deshong (1781–1827), American businessman and banker
- Peter Dinwiddie, American basketball executive
- Peter R. Dolan (born 1956), American business executive
- Peter Done (born 1947), English billionaire businessman
- Peter Dubens (born 1966), British internet entrepreneur
- Peter Dunphy (born 1966), British businessperson and film producer
- Peter Edge, British music executive
- Peter Egardt (born 1949), Swedish executive
- Peter Elworthy (1935–2004), New Zealand farmer and businessman
- Peter Englander, British businessman
- Peter Faneuil (1700–1743), American colonial merchant and slave trader
- Peter Fankhauser (born 1960), Swiss businessman, CEO of the Thomas Cook Group
- Peter Fenix (1939–2017), South African businessman and cricketer
- Peter Flanigan (1922–2013), American investment banker and Nixon aide
- Peter Folger (1905–1980), American coffee magnate
- Peter Fritz (born 1943), American businessman
- Peter Furneaux (1935–2014), English football club chairman and investor
- Peter Gassner, American entrepreneur and businessman
- Peter Gaussen, Governor of the Bank of England
- Peter Georgescu (born 1939), Romanian-American business executive
- Peter Gershon (born 1947), British businessman and former civil servant
- Peter Gloystein (born 1945), German banker
- Peter Godsoe (1938–2023), Canadian banker
- Peter Goldie (1946–2011), British businessman and philosopher
- Peter Goldstein, British businessman
- Peter F. Gontha (born 1948), Indonesian chief executive officer
- Peter Gorman (1808–1862), American businessman
- Peter Gowers (born 1972), British businessman
- Peter Grauer (born 1945), American businessman and entrepreneur
- Peter Grayburn (1925–2022), New Zealand businessman
- Peter Guber (born 1942), American businessman, educator, and author
- Peter Gummer, Baron Chadlington (born 1942), British businessman
- Peter Hadhazy (1944–2006), American football executive
- Peter Halloran (born 1962), American businessman
- Peter Hambro (born 1945), British businessman
- Peter Hargitay (born 1951), public relations executive
- Peter Hargreaves (born 1946), British businessman
- Peter Harkness (born 1949), British media entrepreneur and investor
- Peter Hartman, Dutch businessman
- Peter Hartz (born 1941), German businessman
- Peter S. Hellman, American businessman
- Peter Hill-Wood (1936–2018), British businessman and football club chairman
- Peter Holt (born 1948), American businessman and recipient of the Purple Heart medal
- Peter Horrocks (born 1959), British broadcast executive
- Peter Emil Huber-Werdmüller (1836–1915), Swiss industrialist
- Peter R. Huntsman (born 1963), American business executive
- Peter Hurley, Australian businessman
- Peter Imre (1962–2022), Romanian businessman
- Peter Ivany (born 1954), Australian entrepreneur
- Peter Mentz Jebsen (1930–2014), Norwegian businessperson, athlete, and politician
- Peter Jesperson, American music industry businessman
- Peter Kalikow (born 1942), American real estate developer
- Peter Karmanos Jr. (born 1943), American businessman
- Peter Karoff (died 2017), American nonprofit executive
- Peter Karow (born 1940), German entrepreneur
- Peter Karter (1922–2010), American businessman
- Peter Kellogg (born 1942), American businessman
- Peter Kenyon, British businessman
- Peter Kindersley (born 1941), British businessman
- Peter Klöckner (1863–1940), German industrialist
- Peter Christian Knudtzon (1789–1864), Danish businessman
- Peter Koechley, American writer and internet entrepreneur
- Peter Kohl (born 1965), German businessman and author
- Peter Kujawski, American film studio executive
- Peter Lake, American businessman
- Peter Lam (born 1957), Hong Kong businessman
- Peter Lampl, British philanthropist
- Peter Laudati (died 1977), American sports promoter
- Peter Liguori (born 1960), American business executive
- Peter Lim (born 1954), Singaporean businessman
- Peter Livanos, Greek shipping tycoon
- Peter Loftin (1958–2019), American businessman
- Peter Löthberg (born 1960), Swedish technology entrepreneur
- Peter Luukko (born 1959), American ice hockey executive
- Peter Magowan (1942–2019), American baseball executive
- Peter Malm (1800–1868), Finnish businessman
- Peter Mayle (1939–2018), British businessman and writer
- Peter McGill (1789–1860), Scots-Quebecer businessman
- Peter McLoughlin, American businessman
- Peter C. Meinig, American business executive
- Peter Morton (born 1947), American businessman
- Peter Mowforth (born 1953), British businessman
- Peter Mukerjea (born 1956), British television executive
- Peter W. Mullin (1941–2023), American businessman
- Peter Munga, Kenyan businessman and entrepreneur
- Peter Munk (1927–2018), Hungarian-Canadian businessman
- Peter Murrell (born 1964), former CEO of the Scottish National Party
- Peter Nygård (born 1941), Canadian-Finnish fashion executive
- Peter Oduori, Kenyan accountant and businessman
- Peter Orton (1943–2007), British media entrepreneur and television producer
- Peter Oxford (born 1970), Australian dancer and entrepreneur
- Peter Paduh (born 1977), British businessman
- Peter Pakosh (1911–1999), Canadian businessman
- Peter Pellandine (1927–2012), British car designer and manufacturer
- Peter J. Pestillo (born 1938), American business executive
- Peter Piersanti (1916–1994), American businessman
- Peter Pirsch (1866–1954), American inventor, businessman, and manufacturer
- Peter Plumb (born 1963), English businessman
- Peter Pocklington (born 1941), Canadian entrepreneur
- P. D. Prankerd (1819–1902), English businessman
- Peter Pyhrr, American business writer
- Peter Ragone, American entrepreneur and investor
- Peter Ridsdale (born 1952), English businessman
- Peter Rigby (born 1943), British entrepreneur
- Peter Rinearson (born 1954), American journalist, author, and entrepreneur
- Peter Rippon (born 1965), British broadcasting executive
- Peter Rolt (1798–1882), British businessman and politician
- P. M. Røwde (1876–1955), Norwegian rubber magnate
- Peter Rummell (born 1945), American entrepreneur, investor and businessman
- Peter Arne Ruzicka (born 1964), Norwegian businessperson
- Peter Sauber (born 1943), Swiss motorsport executive
- Peter Schermerhorn (1749–1826), American businessman
- Peter Schiff (born 1963), stockbroker and author
- Peter Schlumbohm (1896–1962), German businessman
- Peter Seah Lim Huat (born 1947), Singaporean businessman
- Peter Seidler (1960–2023), American businessman
- Peter Shalson (born 1957), British businessman
- Peter Shirtcliffe (born 1931), New Zealand businessman
- Peter Sinkamba, Zambian entrepreneur and politician
- Peter Skellerup (1918–2006), New Zealand industrialist
- Peter Smedley (1943–2019), Australian businessman
- Peter Smedvig (born 1946), Norwegian businessman
- Peter H. Soderberg, American business executive
- Peter J. Sodini, American business executive
- Peter Y. Solmssen, American business executive
- Peter Sperling, American businessman
- Peter Spuhler (born 1959), Swiss industrialist and politician
- Peter Stas (born 1963), Dutch entrepreneur and author
- Peter Severin Steenstrup (1807–1863), Norwegian businessperson
- Peter Storrie (born 1952), football chief executive
- Peter P. Straub (1850–1913), American businessman
- Peter Stringfellow (1940–2018), British nightclub owner
- Peter Studebaker (1836–1897), American manufacturer
- Peter Sunde (born 1978), Swedish entrepreneur and politician
- Peter Sutherland (1946–2018), Irish businessman and politician
- Peter Swann (born 1965), British football chairman
- Peter J. Taggares, American businessman
- Peter Talley, New Zealand businessman
- Peter Terium (born 1963), Dutch business executive
- Peter Tham, Singaporean stockbroker
- Peter Thellusson (1735–1797), British-Genevan businessman and banker
- Peter Thiel (born 1967), American entrepreneur and venture capitalist
- Peter Thum, American businessman
- Peter G. Traber, American business executive
- Peter Trevisani, American businessman and investor
- Peter Truax (1828–1909), American businessman and politician
- Peter Tufts, 17th-century American businessman
- Peter Ueberroth (born 1937), American sports executive
- Peter Urban Sartoris, Swiss banker
- Peter Vanacker, Belgian-German business executive
- Peter Vanlore (c. 1547–1627), Dutch-born English merchant, jeweller, and moneylender
- Peter Ventress (born c. 1960), British businessman
- Peter Voser (born 1958), Swiss businessman
- Peter Vyncke, Belgian entrepreneur and Co-CEO of the Vyncke company
- Peter Walters (1931–2023), British businessman
- Peter Wanless (born 1964), British businessman
- Peter Warr (1938–2010), British motorsport executive
- Peter Weinberg (born 1957), American businessman
- Peter Westgarth, British businessman
- Peter Wilmot-Sitwell (1935–2018), British merchant banker and stockbroker
- Peter Wilt, American soccer executive
- Peter Wuffli (born 1957), Swiss businessman
- Peter M. Yeo (born 1963), American business executive
- Peter Záboji (1943–2015), Hungarian entrepreneur
- Peter Zaffino, American executive
- Peter Zürcher, Swiss businessman

== Entertainment ==
- Peter (actor) (born 1952), Japanese actor
- Peter Ablinger (1959–2025), Austrian composer
- Peter Adair (1943–1996), American filmmaker and artist
- Peter Aderhold, German composer and conductor
- Peter Herman Adler (1899–1990), American conductor
- Peter Ågren, Swedish musician, artist, songwriter, and producer
- Peter Ahrweiler (1915–2004), German actor
- Peter Almqvist (1957–2015), Swedish jazz guitarist
- Peter Alsop (born 1946), American musician
- Peter Amory (born 1964), English actor
- Péter Andorai (1948–2020), Hungarian actor
- Peter Andre (born 1973), British-Australian singer, songwriter, and television personality
- Peter Andrej (born 1959), Slovenian musician
- Peter Andrikidis, Australian television director and producer
- Peter Apelgren (born 1959), Swedish artist and comedian
- Peter Apfelbaum (born 1960), American jazz saxophonist and composer
- Peter Appleyard (1928–2013), British–Canadian jazz vibraphonist, percussionist, and composer
- Peter Arens (1928–2015), Swiss actor
- Peter Aristone (born 1980), Slovak singer
- Peter Arne (1924–1983), British actor
- Peter Arno (1904–1968), American cartoonist
- Peter R. Arnott, American songwriter
- Peter Ash (born 1985), English actor
- Peter Ash (composer), American classical composer
- Peter Ashbourne (born 1950), Jamaican musician
- Peter Ashby, English musician and composer
- Peter Asher (born 1944), English guitarist, singer, manager, and record producer
- Peter Ashmore (director), British theatre director and actor
- Peter Askim, American composer and musician
- Peter Askin, American film director, producer, and screenwriter
- Peter Asplund (born 1969), Swedish trumpeter
- Peter Aston (1938–2013), English composer, academic, and conductor
- Peter Atencio (born 1983), American television and film director
- Peter Autschbach (born 1961), German guitarist and music teacher
- Peter Auty (born 1969), British singer
- Peter Avanzino (born 1962), American animation director
- Peter Aykroyd (1955–2021), Canadian actor and comedian
- Péter Bacsó (1928–2009), Hungarian film director and screenwriter
- Peter Badie (1925–2023), American jazz musician
- Peter Bagge (born 1957), American cartoonist
- Peter Baikie, Scottish comedian and composer
- Peter Baird (1952–2004), American film actor and puppeteer
- Peter Baldrachi (born 1967), American singer-songwriter, drummer, and guitarist
- Peter Baltes (born 1958), German bassist
- Peter Bankolé (born 1981), British actor
- Peter Banks (1947–2013), British musician, songwriter, and producer
- Peter Barcza (born 1949), Canadian operatic baritone
- Peter Bardens (1945–2002), English keyboardist
- Peter Bares (1936–2014), German organist and composer
- Peter Barkworth (1929–2006), English actor
- Peter Bartsocas (born 1980), American musician
- Peter Basquin (born 1943), American pianist
- Peter Bassano (1945–2025), English conductor and trombonist
- Peter Bastian (1943–2017), Danish musician
- Peter Batey (director) (1933–2019), Australian director
- Peter Bay, American conductor
- Peter Baykov (born 1998), Bulgarian actor
- Peter Bayliss (1922–2002), English actor
- Peter Baynham (born 1963), Welsh screenwriter, stand-up comedian, and performer
- Peter Beauvais (1916–1986), German director
- Peter Bebjak, Slovak actor, director, producer and writer
- Peter Beckett (born 1948), English musician and songwriter
- Peter Beets (born 1971), Dutch jazz pianist
- Peter Bellamy (1944–1991), English singer
- Peter Belli (1943–2023), Danish singer and actor
- Peter Bence (born 1991), Hungarian pianist
- Peter Benedict (born 1963), Austrian actor, director and writer
- Péter Benkő (born 1947), Hungarian film and television actor
- Peter Benoit (1834–1901), Flemish composer
- Peter Bensley (born 1954), Australian actor
- Peter Berg (born 1964), American actor and director
- Peter Berkos (1922–2024), American sound editor
- Peter Berkow, American television and music producer
- Peter Berkrot (born 1959), American voice actor
- Peter Berling (1934–2017), German actor, film producer and writer
- Peter Berner (born 1963), Australian comedian and broadcaster
- Peter Bevan, British film producer
- Peter Bezencenet (1914–2003), British film director
- Peter Bibby (born 1988), Australian musician
- Peter Biker (born 1961), Danish record producer and songwriter
- Peter Billingsley (born 1971), American actor
- Peter Birrel (1935–2004), English actor
- Peter Biziou (born 1944), British cinematographer
- Peter Bjørnskov (born 1981), Danish singer and record producer
- Peter Blais, Canadian actor
- Peter Blakeley (born 1960), Australian singer
- Peter Blanker (born 1939), Dutch singer
- Peter Blasina, Australian television personality
- Peter Blegvad (born 1951), American singer-songwriter
- Peter Blok (born 1960), Dutch actor
- Peter Blythe (1934–2004), British actor
- Peter Boal, American ballet dancer
- Peter Bocage (1887–1967), American jazz trumpeter and violinist
- Peter Bogdanovich (1939–2022), American film director and actor
- Peter Bolhuis (born 1954), Dutch actor
- Peter Boneham (born 1934), American choreographer, dance educator, and artistic director
- Peter Bonerz (born 1938), American actor and director
- Peter Boothman (1943–2012), Australian jazz guitarist, composer and educator
- Peter Boretski (1929–2001), Canadian actor
- Peter Borgelt (1927–1994), German actor
- Peter Bosse (1931–2018), German film actor
- Peter Boström (born 1971), Swedish songwriter and music producer
- Peter Bowles (1936–2022), English actor
- Peter Bown, British musical artist
- Peter Boyer (born 1970), American classical composer
- Peter Boyles (born 1943), American radio talk show personality
- Peter Brace (1924–2018), British film actor and stunt performer
- Peter Brash (born 1954), American television soap opera writer and librettist
- Peter Brathwaite, British baritone opera singer
- Peter Breck (1929–2012), American actor
- Peter Bree (born 1949), Dutch oboist and radio presenter
- Peter Breiner (born 1957), Slovak pianist, conductor, and composer
- Peter Breinholt (born 1969), American musician
- Peter Brewis, English composer
- Peter Brideoake (1945–2022), Australian musician and singer-songwriter
- Peter Brinckerhoff, American television director
- Peter Brocco (1903–1992), American actor
- Peter Brocklehurst, Australian singer and author
- Peter Broderick (born 1987), American musician
- Peter Broggs (1952–2015), Jamaican musician
- Peter Brogle (1933–2006), Swiss actor
- Peter Bromhead, New Zealand cartoonist
- Peter Bromilow (1933–1994), English-born actor
- Peter Brookes (born 1943), English cartoonist
- Peter Brötzmann (1941–2023), German jazz musician
- Peter Browngardt (born 1979), American animator
- Peter Bruns, German cellist and university professor
- Peter Bruntnell (born 1962), British singer-songwriter
- Peter Bruun (born 1968), Danish composer
- Peter Bucknell, filmmaker and violist
- Peter Buffett (born 1958), American musician
- Peter Bull (1912–1984), British actor
- Peter Bultink, Belgian singer and musician
- Peter Bursch (born 1949), German guitarist and author
- Peter Burton (1921–1989), British actor
- Peter Butt (born 1954), Australian film director
- Peter Butterfield, Canadian conductor and classical tenor
- Peter Butterworth (1915–1979), English actor and comedian
- Peter Caffrey (1949–2008), Irish actor
- Peter Calandra, American musician
- Peter Callander (1939–2014), English songwriter and record producer
- Peter Cambor (born 1978), American film and television actor
- Peter Campus (born 1937), American artist and filmmaker
- Peter Capaldi (born 1958), Scottish actor
- Peter Cape (1926–1979), New Zealand singer
- Peter Capell (1912–1986), German actor
- Peter Care (born 1953), British video game designer
- Peter Carlberg (born 1950), Swedish actor
- Peter Carsten (1928–2012), German actor
- Peter Case (born 1954), American singer-songwriter
- Peter Cash, Canadian singer-songwriter
- Peter Casper Krossing (1793–1838), Danish composer
- Peter Cattaneo (born 1964), British filmmaker
- Peter Cavanaugh (1941–2021), American DJ and author
- Peter Cellier (born 1928), English actor
- Peter Cetera (born 1944), American singer-songwriter
- Peter Chao (born 1987), Canadian comedian
- Peter Cheeseman (1932–2010), British theatre director
- Peter Chelsom (born 1956), British film director, writer, and actor
- Peter Chernobrivets (born 1965), Russian musicologist, composer, and lecturer
- Peter Childs (1939–1989), English actor
- Peter Chilvers (musician), British musician
- Peter Christopherson (1955–2010), English musician
- Peter Cincotti (born 1983), American singer-songwriter
- Peter Clack, Australian drummer
- Peter Claffey (born 1996), Irish actor and rugby union player
- Peter Clayton (1927–1991), English jazz presenter, jazz critic and author
- Peter Cleall (born 1944), British actor
- Peter Clifton (1945–2018), Australian film director and producer
- Peter Cobbin, Australian audio engineer and producer
- Peter Coe (1919–2008), British athletics coach
- Peter Coe (director) (1929–1987), English theatre director
- Peter Coffield (1945–1983), American actor
- Peter Coke (1913–2008), English actor, playwright, and artist
- Peter Coleman-Wright (born 1958), Australian operatic baritone
- Peter Collingwood (1920–2016), Australian/British television actor
- Peter Combe (born 1948), Australian singer
- Peter Cookson (1913–1990), American actor
- Peter Coonan (born 1984), Irish actor
- Peter Copley (1915–2008), English actor
- Peter Corey (1946–2019), British writer, actor, and comedian
- Peter Cornelius (1824–1874), German composer
- Peter Corry, Northern Irish singer, producer, and director
- Peter Cotes (1912–1998), British actor and director
- Peter Couchman, Australian television presenter and journalist
- Peter Cousens (born 1955), Australian actor
- Peter "Mars" Cowling (1946–2018), English bass guitarist
- Peter Coyote (born 1941), American actor, voice actor and director
- Peter Craze (1946–2020), British actor
- Peter Cregeen (born 1940), British television director, producer and executive
- Peter Criss (born 1945), American drummer and singer
- Peter Crombie (1952–2024), American actor
- Peter Cropper (1945–2015), British violinist
- Peter Crossley-Holland (1916–2002), English musicologist and composer
- Peter Croton, Swiss-American lutenist and guitarist
- Péter Csaba, Romanian violinist and conductor of Hungarian ethnic origin
- Peter Cummins (1931–2024), Australian character actor
- Peter Cunnah (born 1966), Northern Irish singer/songwriter
- Peter Cureton (1965–1994), Canadian actor and playwright
- Peter Curtin (1944–2014), Australian actor
- Peter Cushing (1913–1994), English actor
- Peter Czernin (born 1966), British-born film producer
- Peter DaCunha (born 2003), Canadian actor
- Peter Dahlsen (born 1951), Australian actor
- Peter Dala, Canadian conductor of opera and ballet
- Peter Damm (born 1937), German horn player
- Peter Dankelson, motivational speaker and musician
- Peter Dante (born 1968), American actor
- Peter Darling, English dancer and choreographer
- Peter Darrell (1929–1987), British ballet dancer and choreographer
- Peter Dasent, New Zealand musician
- Peter Daube, New Zealand film actor
- Peter Davison (born 1951), British actor
- Peter De Greef (1922–1980), British actor
- Peter de Jersey, British actor
- Peter de Kock (born 1967), Dutch cameraman, film producer and director
- Peter de Koning (born 1960), Dutch singer
- Peter Richter de Rangenier (1930–2021), German composer and conductor
- Peter de Sarigny, South African film producer
- Peter de Wit, Dutch cartoonist and comics artist
- Peter Deary, British singer-songwriter
- Peter Del Monte (1943–2021), Italian film director
- Peter Del Vecho (born 1958), American film producer
- Peter Delpeut (born 1956), Dutch filmmaker and writer
- Peter DeLuise (born 1966), American actor/director/producer
- Peter Deming (born 1957), American cinematographer
- Peter Denahy, Australian singer
- Peter Denyer (1947–2009), English actor
- Peter DePoe (born 1943), Native American musician
- Peter Deriashnyj (born 1946), Ukrainian Australian bandurist, composer of secular and sacred music, and choral conductor
- Peter DeRose (1896–1953), American composer of jazz and pop music
- Peter Diamand (1913–1998), arts administrator and director
- Peter Dijkstra (born 1978), Dutch conductor
- Peter Dinklage (born 1969), American actor
- Peter DiStefano (born 1965), American guitarist and songwriter
- Peter Dizozza (born 1958), American composer
- Peter Dobson (born 1964), American actor
- Péter Dobszay (born 1990), Hungarian organist and composer
- Peter Doell, American musical artist
- Peter Doggett (born 1957), English music journalist
- Peter Dolving (born 1969), Swedish singer
- Peter Dombourian (1920–1992), American music educator and conductor
- Peter Donald (1918–1979), American actor
- Peter Donat (1928–2018), Canadian-American actor
- Peter Dorn (born 1931), German composer and pianist
- Peter Duchin (born 1937), American pianist and bandleader
- Peter DuConge, American jazz musician
- Peter Dudley (1935–1983), English actor
- Peter Duryea (1939–2013), American actor
- Peter Dyke (born 1965), English organist
- Peter Dyneley (1921–1977), British actor
- Peter Corp Dyrendal (born 1976), Thai singer and actor
- Peter G. Dyson, British conductor and music director
- Peter Ebert (1918–2012), German operatic director
- Peter Ecklund (1945–2020), American musician
- Peter Edelmann, Austrian operatic baritone
- Peter Eden, British musical artist
- Peter Eggers (born 1980), Swedish actor
- Peter Ehrlich (1933–2015), German actor
- Peter Ekkart, Belgian dancer and dance teacher
- Peter Elfelt (1866–1931), Danish photographer and film director
- Peter Elkas (born 1976), Canadian musician
- Peter Elkus, American international voice teacher
- Peter Ellefson, American musician
- Peter Elman, American writer and musician
- Peter Elsholtz (1907–1977), German actor
- Peter Emmerich (born 1973), American cartoonist
- Peter Engman (born 1963), Swedish actor
- Peter Entell, American documentary filmmaker
- Péter Eötvös (1944–2024), Hungarian composer, conductor and teacher
- Peter Epstein (born 1967), American jazz saxophonist
- Peter Erkelenz (1897–1966), German actor
- Peter Erős (1932–2014), Hungarian-American symphony and opera conductor
- Peter Erskine (born 1954), American jazz drummer
- Peter Michael Escovedo (born 1961), American Emmy-award nominated percussionist and musical director
- Peter Espevoll (born 1979), Norwegian vocalist
- Peter Everett, Australian television presenter
- Peter Evrard (born 1974), Belgian singer
- Peter Eyre (born 1942), American-born English actor
- Peter Facinelli (born 1973), American actor and producer
- Peter Faiman, Australian film director
- Peter Emanuel Falck (born 1952), Swedish television producer and screenwriter
- Peter Farnan, Australian composer, sound designer, musical director and guitarist
- Peter Farrelly (born 1956), American filmmaker
- Peter Feranec, Slovak conductor
- Peter Ferdinando, British character actor
- Peter Fernandez (1927–2010), American actor
- Peter Fettes, BBC radio presenter
- Peter Feuchtwanger (1930–2016), German musician and music educator
- Peter Allan Fields (1935–2019), American screenwriter and producer
- Peter Filichia (born 1946), American theater critic
- Peter Fincham (born 1956), British television producer
- Peter Finger (born 1954), German musician
- Peter Firth (born 1953), English actor
- Peter Fleischmann (1937–2021), German film director
- Peter Flemming, Canadian television actor
- Peter Flinth (born 1964), Danish film director
- Peter Christian Foersom (1769–1856), Danish organist and composer
- Peter Foldes (1924–1977), Hungarian-British director and animator
- Peter Foldy, Canadian singer
- Peter Fonda (1940–2019), American actor
- Peter Foott (born 1976), Irish film director
- Peter Førde (born 1988), Norwegian actor
- Peter Förtig (1934–2024), German composer
- Peter Fraize, American jazz musician
- Peter Frame (1957–2018), American ballet dancer
- Peter Francey, music director
- Peter Franco (born 1973), audio engineer and music producer
- Peter Frankenfeld (1913–1979), German comedian
- Peter Frankl (born 1935), Hungarian-born British pianist
- Peter Franzén (born 1971), Finnish actor, author, screenwriter and director
- Peter Fratzscher (born 1950), German television and film director
- Peter Frechette (born 1956), American actor
- Peter Freudenthaler (born 1963), German rock singer and songwriter
- Peter Fribbins (born 1969), British composer
- Peter Fricke (born 1939), German actor
- Peter Friedman (born 1949), American actor
- Peter Frohmader (1958–2022), German electronic composer
- Peter Frye, Canadian actor, screenwriter and film director
- Peter Fudakowski (born 1954), English filmmaker
- Peter Ferdinand Funck (1788–1859), German violinist and composer
- Peter Funt, American actor/host/producer
- Peter Furler (born 1966), Australian musician, songwriter and producer
- Peter Gabriel (born 1950), English rock musician, singer-songwriter and humanitarian
- Peter Gadiot (born 1985), British actor
- Peter Gantzler (born 1958), Danish actor
- Peter Garden (1924–2015), German actor
- Peter Kelly Gaudreault, Canadian actor and writer
- Peter Gawthorne (1884–1962), Irish film actor
- Peter Geisler, German clarinetist
- Peter Gelderblom (born 1965), Dutch DJ and record producer
- Peter Gellhorn (1912–2004), German composer and conductor
- Peter Gelling (1960–2018), Australian musician
- Peter Gennaro (1919–2000), American dancer and choreographer
- Peter Gerard, American film director
- Peter Gerety (born 1940), American actor
- Peter Gifford (born 1955), Australian musician
- Peter Giger (born 1939), Swiss percussionist and bandleader
- Peter Gimbel (1927–1987), American filmmaker and underwater photojournalist
- Peter Glantz (born 1975), American dramatist
- Peter Gläser (1949–2008), German rock guitarist and singer
- Peter Glaze (1917–1983), English comedian
- Peter Glenville (1913–1996), English director and actor
- Peter Glossop (1928–2008), English operatic baritone
- Peter Glossop (sound engineer), British sound engineer
- Peter Goalby (born 1950), British singer
- Peter Godwin (singer), British singer
- Peter Goers (born 1956), Australian radio personality
- Peter Michael Goetz (born 1941), American actor
- Peter Emanuel Goldman (born 1939), American film director
- Peter Goodchild (1939–2025), British television editor
- Peter Goodwright (1936–2020), English comedian
- Peter Gordeno (1939–2008), British dancer and singer
- Peter Gordeno (musician) (born 1964), British musician
- Peter Gornstein, Danish filmmaker
- Peter Gorski (1921–2007), German film director
- Péter Gothár (born 1947), Hungarian filmmaker
- Peter Gotthardt (born 1941), German composer
- Peter Gould, American television writer and producer
- Peter Graeme, English oboist and academic teacher
- Peter Adrian Grauer (born 1969), German classical pianist
- Peter Greenaway (born 1942), British filmmaker
- Peter Greene (1965–2025), American actor
- Peter Greenham (1909–1992), British artist
- Peter Greenwell (1929–2006), British composer
- Peter Griesar (born 1969), American musician
- Peter Grimwade (1942–1990), British television writer and director
- Peter Groeger (1933–2018), German actor
- Peter Grønland (1761–1825), Danish composer
- Peter Grosz (born 1974), American actor and television writer
- Peter Grudzien, American singer-songwriter
- Peter Grunwald, American film producer
- Peter Guidi (1949–2018), Scottish jazz saxophonist and flutist
- Peter Gülke (born 1934), German conductor and musicologist
- Peter Gutteridge (1961–2014), New Zealand musician
- Peter Gwinn, American comedian
- Peter Gwynne (1929–2011), New Zealand-born Australian actor
- Peter Haber (born 1952), Swedish actor
- Peter Haddon (1898–1962), British actor
- Peter Haigh (1925–2001), British television presenter
- Peter Hajba (born 1974), Finnish musician
- Peter Halliday (1924–2012), Welsh actor
- Peter Hallström (born 1965), Swedish songwriter
- Peter Hambleton, New Zealand actor
- Peter Michael Hamel (born 1947), German composer
- Peter Hamel (1911–1979), German film director and screenwriter
- Peter Hammill (born 1948), English musician and recording artist
- Peter Hanly (born 1964), Irish actor
- Peter Hänsel (1770–1831), German-Austrian musician and composer
- Peter Harryson (born 1948), Swedish actor, singer and entertainer
- Peter Hawkins (1924–2006), British actor
- Peter Hehir (born 1949), Australian actor
- Peter Hein (born 1973), Indian action choreographer
- Peter Arnold Heise (1830–1879), Danish composer
- Peter Helliar (born 1975), Australian comedian and broadcaster
- Peter Helm (born 1941), Canadian-American film and television actor
- Peter Hemmings (1934–2002), British opera administrator
- Peter Heppner (born 1967), German songwriter and recording artist
- Peter Herbolzheimer (1935–2010), German musician
- Peter Herresthal (born 1970), Norwegian violinist
- Peter Herrmann (1941–2015), German composer
- Peter Ludwig Hertel (1817–1899), German composer
- Peter Youngblood Hills (born 1978), Anglo-American actor
- Peter Himmelman (born 1959), American singer-songwriter
- Peter Hitchener (born 1946), Australian television presenter
- Peter Hixson (born 1966), American animator
- Peter Hoar, British television director
- Peter Hofmann (1944–2010), German tenor
- Peter Holden, American actor
- Peter Holder (organist) (born 1990), British organist and musician
- Peter Hollens (born 1982), American singer
- Peter Holman (born 1946), English conductor and musicologist
- Peter Holmström, American rock musician
- Peter Holsapple (born 1956), American musician
- Peter Honess (born 1946), British film editor
- Peter Hook (born 1956), British bassist
- Peter Hooten (born 1950), American actor
- Peter Hooton (born 1962), British singer
- Peter Hopkinson, English filmmaker and director
- Peter Horan (1926–2010), Irish flute and fiddle player
- Peter Horton (born 1953), American actor and director
- Peter Horton (guitarist) (1941–2023), Austrian guitarist, singer, and writer
- Peter Howarth (born 1960), English musician
- Peter Hudecki, Canadian animator
- Peter Hunnigale (born 1960), British musician
- Peter Huntington, British drummer
- Peter Hurford (1930–2019), British organist and composer
- Peter Hüttner (born 1945), Swedish actor and writer
- Peter Hyams (born 1943), American film director, screenwriter and cinematographer
- Peter Hylenski, American sound engineer
- Peter Hyun (1906–1993), American director and writer
- Peter Iacangelo (1948–2021), American film, stage and television actor
- Peter Igelhoff (1904–1978), Austrian musician
- Peter Illing (1899–1966), Anglo-Austrian actor
- Peter Ind (1928–2021), British jazz double bassist
- Peter Ivers (1946–1983), American musician
- Peter Iwers (born 1975), Swedish bassist
- Peter Jablonski (born 1971), Swedish concert pianist
- Peter Jackson (born 1961), New Zealand film director and producer
- Peter Jankowski (born 1964), American television and film producer
- Peter Janssens (1934–1998), German composer
- Peter Jarolin (1971–2024), Austrian music and drama critic
- Peter Jarvis, American drummer
- Peter Jason (1944–2025), American actor
- Peter Jefferies, New Zealand musician
- Peter Jenner (born 1943), British music manager
- Peter Jerndorff (1842–1926), Danish stage actor and opera singer
- Peter Jessop (born 1964), American actor
- Peter Jihde (born 1972), Swedish television presenter
- Peter Jöback (born 1971), Swedish singer, actor and musical artist
- Peter Johl (1927–2005), American actor
- Peter Joseph (born 1979), American filmmaker and activist
- Peter Tsotsi Juma, Zambian musician
- Peter Jurasik (born 1950), American actor
- Peter Kaberere (died 2014), Kenyan singer
- Peter Kajlinger (born 1964), Swedish operatic baritone
- Peter Kam (born 1961), Hong Kong composer
- Peter Kambasis (born 1974), Canadian-born writer/director
- Peter Kapetan (1956–2008), American actor
- Peter Karrie (born 1946), British singer
- Peter Kass (1923–2008), American theater actor and director
- Peter Kassovitz (born 1938), French film director and screenwriter
- Peter Kastner (1943–2008), Canadian actor
- Peter Kater (born 1958), German-American pianist and composer
- Peter Katin (1930–2015), British pianist and teacher
- Peter Katis (born 1966), American musician and producer
- Peter Kaukonen (born 1945), American musician
- Peter Kazaras, American opera singer
- Peter Keefe (1952–2010), American television producer
- Peter Kelamis (born 1967), Australian actor
- Peter Keleghan (born 1959), Canadian actor and writer
- Peter Kember (born 1965), English musician and record producer
- Peter Kenny, British actor and singer
- Peter Kent (singer) (born 1948), German singer and producer
- Peter Kerekes (born 1973), Slovak film director
- Peter Ketnath (born 1974), German actor, producer and writer
- Peter Wade Keusch, record producer
- Peter Keys (born 1965), American keyboardist
- Peter Kiesewalter, Canadian jazz musician
- Peter Kingsbery (born 1952), American singer-songwriter
- Peter Kinoy, American film director
- Peter Kirichek, Soviet singer
- Peter Kivy (1934–2017), American musicologist
- Peter Klatzow (1945–2021), South African composer
- Peter Kneeshaw, Australian organist
- Peter Knegt, Canadian writer, producer and filmmaker
- Peter Koelewijn (born 1940), Dutch record producer and songwriter
- Peter Kolkay, American bassoonist
- Péter Komlós (1935–2017), Hungarian violinist
- Peter Konwitschny (born 1945), German opera and theatre director
- Peter Kooy, Dutch bass singer
- Peter Koper (1947–2022), American film producer
- Peter Koppes (born 1955), Australian guitarist
- Peter Jona Korn (1922–1998), German composer
- Peter Kosminsky (born 1956), British writer, director and producer
- Peter Kostic, Australian drummer
- Péter Kőszeghy (born 1971), Hungarian composer
- Peter Kotuľa (born 1982), Slovak singer
- Peter Kovachevich, American singer-songwriter
- Peter Kowald (1944–2002), German double bassist and tubist
- Peter Kowitz, Australian actor
- Peter Kraus (born 1939), Austrian singer and actor
- Peter Kremer (born 1958), German theatre and television actor
- Peter Kreuder (1905–1981), German-Austrian pianist, composer and conductor
- Peter Krieg (1947–2009), German filmmaker
- Peter Kruder, Austrian DJ
- Peter Krüger (film director) (born 1970), Belgian filmmaker and screenwriter
- Peter Kuiper (1929–2007), German actor
- Péter Kun (1967–1993), Hungarian musician
- Peter Kunhardt (born 1952), American documentary filmmaker
- Peter Kuplowsky, Canadian film producer
- Peter Kurland, American production sound mixer
- Peter Kurth (born 1957), German actor
- Peter Kuttner, American filmmaker and activist
- Peter La Farge (1931–1965), American singer-songwriter
- Peter Ladue (born 1950), American film director and writer
- Peter Lagger (1926–1979), Swiss operatic bass
- Peter Land (born 1953), New Zealand actor
- Peter Landesman (born 1965), American film director
- Peter Landy (born 1943), Australian television presenter
- Peter Lange-Müller (1850–1926), Danish composer and pianist
- Peter Lanzani (born 1990), Argentine actor and singer
- Peter Laughner (1952–1977), American guitarist, songwriter and singer
- Peter Lauritson, American actor
- Peter Lauterbach (born 1976), German television presenter
- Peter Lawford (1923–1984), British actor
- Peter Leeds (1917–1996), American actor
- Peter Lehel (born 1965), German jazz saxophonist and composer
- Peter LeMarc (born 1958), Swedish singer and songwriter
- Peter Lemer (born 1942), English jazz pianist
- Peter Lemongello (born 1947), American singer
- Peter Lennon (1930–2011), Irish journalist and film director
- Peter Lieberson (1946–2011), American classical composer
- Peter Liechti (1951–2014), Swiss film director
- Peter Lika (born 1947), German operatic bass
- Peter Lilienthal (1927–2023), German film director, writer, actor and producer
- Peter Lindahl (c. 1712–1792), Swedish actor and theatre director
- Peter Lindroos (1944–2003), Finnish opera singer
- Peter Link (born 1944), American composer
- Peter Linz (born 1967), American puppeteer
- Peter Lipa (born 1943), Slovak jazz musician
- Peter Litten (born 1960), British film director and designer
- Peter Litvin (born 1985), American musical artist
- Peter Lobengula (died 1913), South African performer
- Peter Lockyer (born 1974), American actor
- Peter Lohmeyer (born 1962), German actor
- Peter London (born 1982), Swedish musician
- Peter Lord (born 1953), British animator
- Peter Lorre (1904–1964), Hollywood actor
- Peter Loveday (singer-songwriter), Australian singer-songwriter
- Peter Lovšin (born 1955), Slovenian musician
- Peter Luisi, Swiss film director, producer and screenwriter
- Peter Lum (1911–1983), Malaysian television personality
- Peter Lundblad (1950–2015), Swedish singer and songwriter
- Peter Lupo (1535–1608), Italian viol player and composer
- Peter Lurie (born 1962), American voice actor, sports anchor and television personality
- Peter Luscombe, Australian drummer and composer
- Peter Lustig (1937–2016), German television presenter
- Peter Lutkin (1858–1931), American organist, composer and academic
- Peter Luts (born 1971), Belgian DJ, record remixer and producer
- Peter Maag (1919–2001), Swiss conductor
- Peter Macdissi (born 1974), Lebanese actor and producer
- Peter Macfarlane (1927–1965), Canadian TV producer/director
- Peter MacGregor-Scott (1947–2017), English film producer
- Peter Machajdik (born 1961), Slovak composer
- Peter MacNeill, Canadian actor
- Peter MacNicol (born 1954), American actor
- Peter Macon (born 1982), American actor
- Peter Maddocks (1928–2024), English cartoonist
- Peter Maffay (born 1949), Romanian-born German singer
- Peter Magadini (1942–2023), American drummer
- Peter Magnusson (born 1974), Swedish actor, writer and comedian
- Peter Mak (1957–2023), Hong Kong film director and actor
- Peter Malberg (1887–1965), Danish actor
- Peter Malick (born 1951), American guitarist
- Peter Mamakos (1918–2008), American actor
- Peter Mandrup Lem (1758–1828), Danish violin virtuoso
- Peter Mansson (born 1974), Swedish music producer and songwriter
- Peter Marchbank, British conductor
- Peter Margasak, American music critic
- Peter Marin (born 1978), Australian musician
- Peter Maris, American film director
- Peter Mark (conductor) (born 1940), American conductor and violist
- Peter Markle (born 1952), American director and screenwriter
- Peter Marquardt (1964–2014), American actor
- Peter G. Marston (1935–2022), American actor
- Peter Martell (1938–2010), Italian film actor
- Peter Martins (born 1946), Danish ballet dancer and choreographer
- Peter Masterson (1934–2018), American actor, director and writer
- Peter Matić (1937–2019), Austrian actor
- Peter Mattei (born 1965), Swedish operatic baritone
- Peter Matz (1928–2002), American musician, composer, arranger and conductor
- Peter Mayes (born 1976), Australian musician and producer
- Peter Mayhew (1944–2019), American actor
- Peter McBain, Canadian comedian and writer
- Peter McCauley (born 1950), New Zealand actor
- Peter McEnery (born 1940), British actor
- Peter McGann, Irish comedian, actor and writer
- Peter McGarr (born 1953), English classical composer and teacher
- Peter McGillivray (born 1976), Canadian opera singer
- Peter McGovern (1927–2006), English songwriter
- Peter McPoland (born 2000), American singer, songwriter and musician
- Peter McRobbie (born 1943), Scottish-born American actor
- Peter Meaden (1941–1978), English manager, publicist and songwriter
- Peter Medak (born 1937), Hungarian-British film and television director
- Peter Mehlman, American entertainer
- Peter Rodgers Melnick (born 1958), American conductor
- Peter Mengede, Australian guitarist
- Peter Mennin (1923–1983), American composer, administrator and teacher
- Peter Mensah (born 1959), Ghanaian-British actor
- Peter Mensch (born 1953), American music manager
- Peter Messaline (1944–2016), English-Canadian actor
- Peter Metro, Jamaican disc jockey
- Peter Mettler (born 1958), Canadian film director and cinematographer
- Peter Meven (1929–2003), German opera singer
- Peter Millowitsch (born 1949), German film and television actor
- Peter Mimi (born 1987), Egyptian director and screenwriter
- Peter Minack, Australian singer
- Peter Minich (1927–2013), Austrian singer and opera singer
- Peter Mintun (born 1950), American pianist
- Peter Mochrie (born 1959), Australian actor
- Peter Mokran, American musician and composer
- Peter Mokrosinski (born 1953), Polish-Swedish cinematographer
- Peter Momtchiloff (born 1962), British musician
- Peter Mooney (born 1983), Canadian actor
- Peter Morén (born 1976), Swedish musician
- Peter Mosbacher (1912–1977), German actor
- Peter Mosely (born 1980), American rock musician
- Peter Mostovoy (born 1938), Russian-Israeli filmmaker
- Peter Mountain (1923–2013), English violinist
- Peter Muck (1919–2011), German musician
- Peter Mullan (born 1959), Scottish actor and filmmaker
- Peter Mulvey (born 1969), American singer-songwriter
- Peter Murnik (born 1965), American actor
- Peter Murray-Hill (1908–1957), English actor
- Peter Murrieta, American television producer and writer
- Peter Musevski (1965–2020), Slovenian actor
- Peter Musson (1940–2022), Australian musician
- Peter Muyzers, special effects artist
- Peter Mygind (born 1963), Danish actor and television personality
- Peter Najarian (born 1963), American television presenter
- Peter Nalitch (born 1981), Russian singer
- Peter Nardone (born 1965), British conductor, singer and composer
- Peter Nashel, American composer
- Peter Nero (1934–2023), American pianist and pops conductor
- Peter Newbrook (1920–2009), British cinematographer
- Peter Nicks (born 1968), American filmmaker
- Péter Nógrádi (born 1952), Hungarian composer
- Peter Noone, (born 1947) English singer-songwriter and actor. Lead singer of Herman's Hermits
- Peter Nydrle (1954–2014), American director
- Peter Nzioki (born 1978), Kenyan actor
- Peter Oakley (1927–2014), British vlogger
- Peter Odeke (born 1970), Ugandan actor
- Peter O'Doherty (born 1958), Australian musician and visual artist
- Peter O'Fallon, American television director
- Peter Okoye (born 1981), Nigerian singer
- Peter Oldring (born 1971), Canadian actor
- Peter O'Mara (born 1957), Australian musician
- Peter O'Meara (born 1969), Irish actor
- Peter One (born 1956), Ivorian-American folk singer
- Peter Onorati (born 1953), American actor
- Peter Orloff (born 1944), German recording artist, composer, actor and songwriter
- Peter O'Shaughnessy (1923–2013), Australian actor
- Peter Oskarson (born 1951), Swedish theatre director and actor
- Peter Ostermayr (1882–1967), German film director
- Peter Ostroushko (1953–2021), American violinist and mandolinist
- Peter Ostrum (born 1957), American veterinarian and child actor
- Peter O'Toole (1932–2013), English actor
- Peter Oundjian (born 1955), Canadian-American violinist and conductor
- Peter Outerbridge (born 1966), Canadian actor
- Peter Ovtcharov (born 1961), Russian classical pianist
- Peter Oxley, Australian musician
- Peter Packay (1904–1966), Belgian jazz composer and trumpet player
- Peter Pagan (1921–1999), Australian actor
- Peter Paige (born 1969), American actor
- Peter Palitzsch (1918–2004), German theatre director and theatre manager
- Peter Pannekoek (born 1986), Dutch comedian
- Peter Parcek, American singer
- Peter Parros (born 1960), American actor
- Peter Pasetti (1916–1996), German actor
- Peter Patzak (1945–2021), Austrian film director
- Peter Pau, Hong Kong cinematographer
- Peter Pears (1910–1986), English tenor
- Peter Penry-Jones (1938–2009), Welsh actor
- Péter Perjés (born 1968), Hungarian singer-songwriter
- Peter Perrett (born 1952), English singer, songwriter, musician and record producer
- Peter Perski (born 1970), Swedish actor
- Peter Piekos (1918–2000), Dutch voice actor
- Peter Pinne (born 1937), Australian writer and composer
- Peter Pitt (1927–2020), British film editor
- Peter Planyavsky (born 1947), Austrian organist and composer
- Peter Plate (born 1967), German musician, singer, songwriter and record producer
- Peter Platt (musician) (born 1965), Austrian composer and musician
- Peter Plaugborg (born 1980), Danish actor
- Peter Poles (born 1978), Slovenian television personality
- Peter Polycarpou (born 1957), English-Cypriot actor
- Peter Pomerantsev (born 1977), British journalist and filmmaker
- Peter Porte (born 1984), American actor
- Peter Posa (1941–2019), New Zealand guitarist
- Peter Pou (born 1992), American singer-songwriter
- Peter Pragas (1926–2014), Malaysian composer and musician
- Peter Pratt (1923–1995), British opera singer and actor
- Peter Prier (1942–2015), American violin maker
- Peter Pringle (born 1945), Canadian musician
- Peter Proud (1913–1989), British film art director
- Peter Przygodda (1941–2011), German filmmaker and editor
- Peter Purves (born 1939), English actor
- Peter Quanz (born 1979), Canadian choreographer
- Peter Raabe (1872–1945), German conductor
- Peter Radtke (1943–2020), German actor and playwright
- Peter Raeburn, British composer, music producer and songwriter
- Peter Rainer, German violinist
- Peter Ramsey (born 1962), American film director
- Peter Randazzo (born 1943), American dancer and choreographer
- Peter Rangmar (1956–1997), Swedish comedian and actor
- Peter Rauhofer (1965–2013), Austrian-American disc jockey
- Peter Raymont (born 1950), Canadian filmmaker
- Peter Reardon (born 1970), American music producer
- Peter Reckell (born 1955), American actor and musician
- Peter Rehberg (1968–2021), Austrian-British musician
- Peter Reichhardt (born 1967), Danish actor and theatre director
- Peter Reijnders (1900–1974), Dutch film director
- Peter J. Reineman, American actor
- Peter Renaday (1935–2024), American actor
- Peter Renkens (1967–2023), Belgian singer
- Peter Reulein (born 1966), German composer
- Peter Reusse (1941–2022), German actor
- Peter Reveen (1935–2013), Australian hypnotist and illusionist
- Peter Riegert (born 1947), American actor
- Peter Ries, German record producer and musician
- Peter Ritter (1763–1846), German composer, conductor, chorus master and cellist
- Peter Ritzen (born 1956), Flemish pianist composer and conductor
- Peter Rodger (born 1965), British filmmaker
- Peter Roeck, Canadian film and television editor
- Peter Roleff (1906–1994), German ballet dancer, choreographer and dance teacher
- Peter Rösel (born 1945), German pianist
- Peter Rosenberg (born 1979), American radio disc jockey
- Peter Roth-Ehrang (1925–1966), German operatic bass
- Peter Rowan (born 1942), American bluegrass musician
- Peter Rowell (born 1958), English radio and television presenter
- Peter Rühring (1942–2025), German actor
- Peter Rundel (born 1958), German violinist and conductor
- Peter "Madcat" Ruth (born 1949), American harmonica player
- Peter Ruzicka (born 1948), German composer and conductor
- Peter Rybar (1913–2002), Swiss violinist
- Peter Rycroft (born 1993), British songwriter and producer
- Peter L. Rypdal (1909–1988), Norwegian traditional musician
- Peter Sacco (1928–2000), American singer
- Peter Safran (born 1965), British-American producer and manager
- Peter Salett (born 1969), American singer
- Peter Salisbury (born 1971), British rock drummer
- Peter Sallis (1921–2017), British actor
- Peter Samuelson (born 1951), American-British TV and film producer
- Peter Sandloff (1924–2009), German composer
- Peter Sandys-Clarke (born 1981), British actor
- Peter Santenello (born 1977), American YouTuber
- Peter Saraf, American film producer
- Peter Sarkisian (born 1965), American video and multimedia artist
- Peter Sarsgaard (born 1971), American actor
- Peter Sarstedt (1941–2017), British singer-songwriter
- Peter Sasdy (born 1935), British film director
- Peter Sattmann (1947–2025), German actor and musician
- Peter Scanavino (born 1980), American actor
- Peter Schaap (1946–2025), Dutch singer and writer
- Peter Schacht (1901–1945), German composer
- Peter Schamoni (1934–2011), German film director
- Peter Schärli (born 1955), Swiss jazz trumpeter
- Peter Schat (1935–2003), Dutch composer
- Peter Schaufuss (born 1949), Danish choreographer
- Péter Scherer (born 1961), Hungarian actor
- Peter Schickele (1935–2024), American composer, musical educator and parodist
- Peter Schidlof (1922–1987), Austrian musician
- Peter Schildt (born 1951), Swedish actor
- Peter Schilling (born 1956), German singer
- Peter Schilperoort (1919–1990), Dutch musician
- Peter Schimke (1960–2020), American musician
- Peter Schindler (born 1960), German composer, pianist, keyboardist, organist and author
- Peter Schmalfuss (1937–2008), German pianist
- Peter Schmidl (1941–2025), Austrian clarinetist
- Peter Schram (1819–1895), Danish opera singer and actor
- Peter Schreier (1935–2019), German tenor and conductor
- Peter Schumann (born 1934), American puppet theater director
- Peter Sciberras, Australian film editor
- Peter Scolari (1955–2021), American actor
- Peter Scriven (1930–1998), Australian puppeteer
- Peter Sculthorpe (1929–2014), Australian composer
- Peter Seabourne, English composer
- Peter Searcy, American songwriter
- Peter Sedufia, Ghanaian filmmaker
- Peter Segal (born 1962), American film director
- Peter Seiffert (1954–2025), German tenor
- Peter Sellars (born 1957), American theatre director
- Peter Sellers (1925–1980), British actor
- Peter Selvakumar (died 2006), Indian director and screenwriter
- Peter Serafinowicz (born 1972), British actor
- Peter Serkin (1947–2020), American pianist
- Peter Settman (born 1969), Swedish actor, comedian, television presenter, screenwriter and television producer
- Peter Seymour (born 1977), American musician
- Peter Shelley (1943–2023), British singer, songwriter and producer
- Peter Shin, American animator
- Peter Shinkoda (born 1971), Canadian actor
- Peter Shockey (born 1955), American film director
- Peter Shoukry, Egyptian-American model
- Peter Shukoff (born 1979), American comedian, musician, and YouTube celebrity
- Peter Silberman (born 1986), American singer
- Peter Simel, better known by his online moniker Palm Beach Pete, American social media personality
- Peter Simonischek (1946–2023), Austrian actor
- Peter Skellern (1947–2017), English singer-songwriter and pianist
- Peter Slabakov (1923–2009), Bulgarian actor
- Peter Slaghuis (1961–1991), Dutch dance music DJ, producer and remixer
- Peter Sliker (1925–2010), American opera singer
- Peter Slowik, American musician
- Peter Snell (producer), Canadian film producer
- Peter Sodann (1936–2024), German actor, director and politician
- Peter Sohn (born 1977), American filmmaker and animator at Pixar
- Peter Sollett (born 1976), American film director and screenwriter
- Peter Solley (1948–2023), English musician and record producer
- Peter Solowka, British musician
- Peter Sommer (born 1974), Danish singer and songwriter
- Peter Sommer (director), British documentary filmmaker
- Peter Sova (1944–2020), Czech-born American cinematographer
- Peter Spears (born 1965), American actor and filmmaker
- Peter Spellos (1954–2023), American voice actor
- Peter Spence (actor), Canadian film and television actor
- Peter Spirer, American film director
- Peter Sprague (born 1955), American jazz guitarist
- Peter Sproule (1947–2010), English actor
- Peter Stadlen (1910–1996), Austrian pianist, musicologist and critic
- Peter Stampfel (born 1938), American musician
- Peter Stapleton (1954–2020), New Zealand musician
- Peter Stark, British conductor and teacher
- Peter Starkie (1948–2020), Australian musical artist
- Peter Stebbings (born 1971), Canadian actor
- Peter Steele (1962–2010), American musician
- Peter Steen (1936–2013), Danish actor
- Peter Steuger (born 1965), German-born cinematographer
- Peter Stickles (born 1976), American actor
- Peter Stormare (born 1953), Swedish actor
- Peter Straker (born 1943), Jamaican-born singer and actor
- Peter Strauss (born 1947), American actor
- Peter Stroud, American musician
- Peter Stuart, American singer
- Peter Stubbs (special effects artist), Australian special effects artist
- Peter Sumner (1942–2016), Australian actor
- Peter Sunman, Welsh musician
- Peter Suschitzky (born 1941), British cinematographer and photographer
- Peter Svensson (born 1974), Swedish musician
- Peter Swanwick (1922–1968), British actor
- Peter Swartling (born 1964), Swedish record producer
- Péter Szalai (born 1962), Hungarian tabla player musician
- Péter Szervánszky (1913–1985), Hungarian violinist
- Peter Szewczyk, American film director
- Peter Tagg, in Cardiacs and The Trudy
- Peter Tägtgren (born 1970), Swedish musician and record producer
- Peter Tahourdin (1928–2009), Australian composer
- Peter Tanfield (born 1961), British violinist
- Peter Tanner (1914–2002), British film editor
- Peter Teschner, American film editor
- Peter Tevis (1937–2006), American singer
- Peter Tewksbury (1923–2003), American film director
- Peter Theremin (born 1991), Russian composer
- Peter Thoegersen (born 1967), American musician
- Peter Thoms, English musician
- Peter Thorup (1948–2007), Danish musician
- Peter Tiboris (1947–2024), American conductor
- Peter Tilbury (born 1945), English actor and writer
- Péter Tímár (born 1950), Hungarian film director
- Peter Togni (born 1959), Canadian composer
- Peter Toh (born 1981), American singer
- Peter Tolan (born 1958), American television director
- Peter Tomarken (1942–2006), American television personality
- Peter Tork (1942–2019), American singer and guitarist
- Peter Torokvei (1951–2013), Canadian screenwriter, actor and television producer
- Peter Tosh (1944–1987) Jamaican reggae musician
- Peter Toussaint, Dutch singer-songwriter and musician
- Peter Tranchell (1922–1993), British composer
- Peter Traugott (born 1970), American television producer
- Peter Travers (born 1943), American film critic
- Peter Trunk (1936–1973), German composer
- Peter Tscherkassky (born 1958), Austrian avant-garde filmmaker
- Peter Tsotsi, Zimbabwean musician
- Peter Tuddenham (1918–2007), British actor
- Peter Tuite (born 1976), Irish pianist
- Peter Turgeon (1919–2000), American actor
- Peter Ulrich (born 1958), British songwriter and recording artist
- Peter Urlich, New Zealand musician
- Peter Ury (1920–1976), Jewish composer
- Peter Ustinov (1921–2004), English actor, writer and dramatist
- Peter Vack (born 1986), American actor
- Péter Vácz (born 1988), Hungarian animator and film director
- Peter van Anrooy (1879–1954), Dutch composer and conductor
- Peter Van de Graaff (born 1961), American singer and radio personality
- Peter Van de Veire (born 1971), Flemish radio personality
- Peter Van Den Begin (born 1964), Belgian actor and director
- Peter van Eyck (1911–1969), German-American actor
- Peter van Gelder (born 1940), American sitarist and musician
- Peter Van Hoesen (born 1970), Belgian electronic music producer, composer, DJ and live performer
- Peter Van Hooke (born 1950), British musician
- Peter van Huffel (born 1978), Canadian jazz saxophonist, clarinetist and composer
- Peter Van Norden (born 1950), American actor
- Peter van Steeden (1904–1990), Dutch composer
- Peter Van Wood (1927–2010), Dutch guitarist, singer, songwriter, actor and astrologer
- Peter Vere-Jones (1939–2021), New Zealand actor
- Peter Verhoyen (born 1968), Belgian flautist and piccolo player
- Peter Vermeersch (born 1959), Belgian clarinet player, composer and music producer
- Peter Viitanen (born 1980), Swedish actor
- Peter Vince (1942–2020), English sound engineer, producer and operations manager
- Peter Vives (born 1987), Spanish actor
- Peter von Bagh (1943–2014), Finnish film historian
- Peter Michael von der Nahmer (born 1977), German-born American composer and sound researcher
- Peter von Gomm (born 1968), American voice actor
- Peter von Gunten, Swiss film director
- Peter Josef von Lindpaintner (1791–1856), German composer
- Peter von Puttkamer (born 1962), Canadian filmmaker
- Peter Voß (1891–1979), German actor
- Peter Wackel (born 1977), German singer
- Peter Wadams (born 1978), New Zealand DJ and producer
- Peter Wallfisch (1924–1993), British concert pianist
- Peter Wang, American film director
- Peter Waring (1916–1949), English radio comedian and fraudster
- Peter Warlock (1894–1930), British composer and music critic
- Peter Warlock (magician) (1904–1995), British magician
- Peter Washington (born 1964), American jazz double bassist
- Peter Watchorn (born 1957), Australian harpsichordist
- Peter Watkins (1935–2025), English filmmaker
- Peter Weatherley (1930–2015), British film editor
- Peter Webber, British director
- Peter Weck (born 1930), Austrian film director and actor
- Peter Welch (1922–1984), English actor
- Peter Weller (born 1947), American actor
- Peter Wellington, Canadian film and television director
- Peter Werner (1947–2023), American film and television director
- Peter Wertheimer (1947–2020), Romanian-Israeli musician
- Peter Westergaard (1931–2019), American composer and music theorist
- Peter Whitbread (1928–2004), English actor and screenwriter
- Peter Whitford, Australian actor
- Peter Whitney (1916–1972), American actor
- Peter Wichers (born 1979), Swedish guitarist and producer
- Peter Wieland (1930–2020), German singer
- Peter Wildman (born 1954), Canadian actor
- Peter Wildoer (born 1974), Swedish drummer
- Peter Wilhousky (1902–1978), American composer, music educator and choral conductor
- Peter Wingfield (born 1962), Welsh actor
- Peter K. Winkler, American composer and musicologist
- Peter Winter (1754–1825), German opera singer and composer
- Peter Wintonick (1953–2013), Canadian documentary filmmaker
- Peter Woeste, German-Canadian television director
- Peter Wolbrandt (born 1952), German guitarist
- Peter Wollen (1938–2019), English film theorist and filmmaker
- Peter Woodthorpe (1931–2004), English actor
- Peter Woodward (born 1956), British actor and writer
- Peter Wooley (1934–2017), American film producer
- Peter Wunstorf (born 1959), Canadian cinematographer
- Peter Wyngarde (1927–2018), British actor
- Peter Yang (1935–2022), Hong Kong film actor, producer and director
- Peter Yarrow (1938–2025), American singer and songwriter, Peter, Paul and Mary
- Peter Yu (born 1968), Singaporean actor
- Peter Zadek (1926–2009), German director
- Peter Zak (born 1965), American jazz pianist and composer
- Peter Zauner (1886–1973), Austrian musician and composer
- Peter Zavadil, American music video director
- Peter Zeitlinger (born 1960), Austrian cinematographer
- Peter Zinner (1919–2007), Austrian-American film editor
- Peter Zinovieff (1933–2021), British engineer and composer
- Peter Zirschky, Dutch musician
- Peter Zizzo (born 1966), American songwriter
- Peter Zummo, American composer

== Journalism ==
- Peter Abrahams (1919–2017), South African novelist, journalist, and political commentator
- Peter Applebome (born 1949), American journalist and writer
- Peter Arnett (1934–2025), New Zealand-American journalist
- Peter Bale (born 1962), New Zealand journalist and editor
- Peter Beinart (born 1971), American columnist, journalist, and political commentator
- Peter Bergen (born 1962), American journalist
- Peter Bhatia, American journalist and editor
- Peter Bichsel (1935–2025), Swiss writer and journalist
- Peter Biskind, American historian, journalist and editor
- Peter Blachstein (1911–1977), German journalist
- Peter Blunden (born 1958), Australian journalist and newspaper editor
- Peter Bodo (born 1949), American journalist
- Peter Boenisch (1927–2005), German journalist and author
- Peter Brackley (1951–2018), English Football commentator
- Peter Bratt (born 1944), Swedish journalist
- Peter Bromley (1929–2003), English horse-racing commentator
- Peter Bruce (journalist) (born 1952), South African journalist
- Peter Brunette (1943–2010), American journalist
- Peter Burton (1945–2011), English journalist
- Peter Buwalda (born 1971), Dutch journalist, novelist and editor
- Peter Ames Carlin (born 1963), American journalist and writer
- Peter Charley (born 1956), Australian journalist
- Peter Chippindale (1945–2014), British newspaper journalist and author
- Peter Darbyshire (born 1967), Canadian journalist, blogger and author
- Peter Daut (born 1983), American journalist
- Peter Dench (born 1972), British photojournalist
- Peter Doocy (born 1987), American journalist
- Peter Downie, Canadian journalist
- Peter Drury (born 1967), English football commentator
- Peter Dunstan Hastings (1920–1990), Australian journalist and editor
- Peter Dykstra (1957–2024), American journalist
- Peter Enahoro (1935–2023), Nigerian journalist
- Peter Ferrara (born 1955), American journalist
- Peter Finnerty (1766–1822), Irish printer, publisher, and journalist
- Peter Franzen, British journalist
- Peter Freyne (1949–2009), American journalist
- Peter Frilingos (1944–2004), Australian sports journalist
- Peter Fryer (1927–2006), English writer and journalist
- Peter Garrison (born 1943), American journalist
- Peter S. Goodman, American economics journalist and author
- Peter Greenberg, American travel journalist
- Peter Greenough (1917–2006), American journalist and editor
- Peter Greste (born 1965), Australian journalist
- Peter Gzowski (1934–2002), Canadian broadcaster, writer and reporter
- Peter Hackes (1924–1994), American journalist
- Peter Hartcher (born 1963), Australian journalist
- Peter Härtling (1933–2017), German writer, poet, publisher and journalist
- Peter Hebblethwaite (1930–1994), British Jesuit priest, writer, and journalist
- Peter Hellyer (1947–2023), British journalist and archaeologist
- Peter Hessler (born 1969), American writer and journalist
- Peter Hetherington, British journalist
- Peter Hitchens (born 1951), English journalist and author
- Peter Holder (born 1964), Australian journalist and writer
- Peter Hoskin, British journalist
- Peter Hounam (born 1944), British journalist
- Peter Hyman, American journalist, author, humorist and entrepreneur
- Peter Jančič, Slovenian publicist
- Peter Job (born 1941), British journalist and businessman
- Peter Kalischer, American journalist
- Peter R. Kann, American journalist, editor and businessman
- Peter W. Kaplan (1954–2013), American newspaper editor
- Peter Kellner (born 1946), English journalist
- Peter Kempadoo (1926–2019), Guyanese novelist and broadcaster
- Peter Keogh (1929–2016), Irish Gaelic journalist and sports administrator
- Peter Kloeppel, German journalist
- Peter Kolosimo (1922–1984), Italian journalist and writer
- Peter LaBarbera, American journalist
- Peter Lalor, Australian journalist
- Peter Lance (born 1948), American journalist and author
- Peter Laufer (born 1950), American journalist, broadcaster and documentary filmmaker
- Peter Lavelle (born 1961), American journalist and RT television presenter
- Peter Leoke (1892–1973), Estonian publisher
- Peter Limbourg (born 1960), German broadcast journalist
- Peter Lisagor (1915–1976), American journalist
- Peter Maas (1929–2001), American journalist and author
- Peter Maass (born 1960), American journalist
- Peter Macann, English footballer
- Peter Mackler (1949–2008), American journalist
- Peter Maniatis (born 1973), Australian television host
- Peter Mansbridge (born 1948), Canadian broadcast journalist
- Peter Mayer (1936–2018), British-born American publisher
- Peter McCabe (1945–1998), English author and music journalist
- Peter McFarline (1945–2002), Australian journalist
- Peter Meakin (born 1942), Australian journalist
- Peter Menzel (born 1948), American journalist
- Peter Merseburger (1928–2022), German journalist and author
- Peter Noah, American television writer and producer
- Peter Nowalk (born 1978), American television writer and producer
- Peter Noyes (journalist), American newscaster and journalist
- Peter Nyman (born 1966), Finnish journalist
- Peter Oborne (born 1957), British journalist and broadcaster
- Peter Osnos (born 1943), American journalist and publisher
- Peter O'Sullevan (1918–2015), Irish-British horse racing commentator
- Peter Overton (born 1966), Australian television presenter and journalist
- Peter Paphides (born 1969), British journalist and broadcaster
- Peter Penzoldt (1925–1969), American journalist
- Peter Plagens, American journalist
- Peter Popham (born 1952), English journalist, author and playwright
- Peter Preston (1938–2018), British journalist
- Peter C. Rhodes, American journalist and writer
- Peter Riddell (born 1948), British journalist and author
- Peter Ruehl (1947–2011), US-Australian newspaper columnist
- Peter Schmuck (born 1955), American journalist
- Peter Scholl-Latour (1924–2014), German journalist and author
- Peter Schrager (born 1982), American sportscaster
- Peter Sellers (1921–2016), New Zealand sports broadcaster
- Peter Shellem (1960–2009), American journalist
- Peter Sichrovsky, Austrian journalist and politician
- Peter Siepen (born 1962), Swedish television presenter
- Peter Silverman (1931–2021), Canadian broadcast journalist
- Peter Sissons (1942–2019), English journalist and broadcaster
- Peter Slotsvik (1862–1924), Norwegian newspaper editor
- Peter Smollett, British journalist
- Peter Sonski (born 1962), American radio host
- Peter James Spielmann (born 1952), American journalist
- Peter Stackpole (1913–1997), American photojournalist
- Peter Stefanovic (born 1981), Australian journalist, reporter and TV presenter
- Peter Steinfels (born 1941), American journalist and educator
- Peter Stothard (born 1951), British journalist
- Peter Stursberg (1913–2014), Canadian writer and broadcaster
- Peter Symes (born 1957), Australian researcher into paper money
- Peter Tanev (born 1968), Danish weather presenter
- Peter Tetteroo (born 1963), Dutch journalist and filmmaker
- Peter Throckmorton (1928–1990), American photojournalist and a pioneer underwater archaeologist
- Peter Tomlinson (born 1943), British broadcaster
- Peter Tompkins (1919–2007), American journalist
- Peter Tripp (1926–2000), American radio personality
- Peter Trueman (1934–2021), Canadian journalist
- Péter Uj (born 1969), Hungarian journalist
- Peter Underwood (1923–2014), British parapsychologist
- Peter Van Sant (born 1953), American television journalist
- Peter Veness (1984–2012), Australian journalist
- Peter Vladimirov (1905–1953), Soviet diplomat and journalist
- Peter Wallsten, American journalist
- Peter Wilby (born 1944), British journalist
- Peter Windsor (born 1952), Australian motorsport journalist
- Peter Woon (1931–2014), British journalist
- Peter Worthington (1927–2013), Canadian journalist
- Peter H. Wyden (1923–1998), American journalist
- Peter Zuckerman (born 1979), American journalist and author

== Justice ==
- Peter W. Agnes Jr., American judge
- Peter Alldridge, British lawyer
- Peter Almond, Australian judge
- Peter Altabef, American businessman and lawyer
- Peter Angelos (1929–2024), American trial lawyer
- Peter Annis, Canadian judge
- Peter Applegarth (born 1953), Australian judge
- Peter Friedrich Arpe (1682–1740), German lawyer, historian and legal writer
- Peter Awoonor-Renner, Gold Coast lawyer
- Peter C. Bacon (1804–1886), American lawyer
- Peter Badge (1931–2020), British solicitor and judge
- Peter Benenson (1921–2005), British lawyer and human rights activist
- Peter Ulrich Frederik Benzon (1760–1840), Danish jurist and landowner
- Peter Bernard, Chief Justice of Jamaica
- Peter Beshar, American attorney
- Peter Beter (1921–1987), American lawyer
- Peter Beverley, English-born planter and lawyer
- Peter Birks (1941–2004), British legal academic
- Peter Blanchard (born 1942), New Zealand judge
- Peter Blanck, American academic and lawyer
- Peter Blaxell, Australian justice
- Peter Braid, Lord Braid, Scottish judge
- Peter Bryan Bruin (1754–1827), Mississippi territorial judge
- Peter Hardeman Burnett (1807–1895), American judge, governor of California and slave owner
- Peter Bynoe (born 1951), American lawyer and businessman
- Peter Callaghan, Australian judge
- Peter Čeferin (born 1938), Slovenian lawyer
- Peter Charleton (born 1956), Irish judge
- Peter Clyne (1927–1987), Austrian-Australian lawyer, businessman, tax consultant and author
- Peter Combrinck, South African judge
- Peter Johan Alexei Conradt-Eberlin (1789–1847), Danish Supreme Court justice
- Peter Cory (1925–2020), Canadian judge
- Peter Coulson (born 1958), UK High Court and Appeal Court judge
- Peter Curry (1921–2010), English lawyer and athlete
- Peter Deegan (born 1970), American attorney
- Peter Detkin, American patent attorney
- Peter DeTroy (1948–2016), American lawyer
- Peter Eckerstrom (born 1960), Arizona Court of Appeals judge
- Peter C. Economus (born 1943), American judge
- Peter Edelman (born 1938), American lawyer
- Peter Eigen (born 1938), German lawyer
- Peter Erle (1795–1877), English lawyer
- Peter Erlinder (1948–2024), American lawyer
- Peter Faris, Australian lawyer
- Peter C. W. Flory (born 1955), American attorney and Defense official
- Peter Gabel (1947–2022), American legal scholar
- Peter Garling, Australian judge
- Peter Francis Geraci, American lawyer
- Peter Gilliéron (born 1953), Swiss lawyer and football official
- Peter Goldstone (1926–2013), British solicitor and judge
- Peter S. Grosscup (1852–1921), American judge
- Peter Häberle (1934–2025), German legal scholar
- Peter Halkerston, Scottish lawyer and author
- Peter Heerey (1939–2021), Australian judge
- Peter Hely (1944–2005), Australian judge
- Peter Herrndorf (1940–2023), Canadian lawyer and businessman
- Peter Heywood (governor), Chief Justice of Jamaica
- Peter Hidden, Australian judge
- Peter Hogg (1939–2020), New Zealand–Canadian legal scholar
- Peter William Humphrey (born 1956), British journalist and private detective
- Peter Hustinx, Dutch lawyer
- Peter W. Hutchins (1945–2023), Canadian legal scholar
- Peter Jann (born 1935), Austrian jurist
- Peter P. Jurchak (1900–1948), American lawyer
- Peter Keisler (born 1960), American lawyer
- Peter Kerecman (born 1972), Slovak writer and non-fiction author
- Peter Kibatala, Tanzania litigation attorney
- Peter Kidd (born 1965), Australian jurist
- Peter Killough (born 1960), American judge
- Peter Kirsanow (born 1953), American lawyer and politician
- Peter Knecht (1936–2014), American lawyer
- Peter Koski, American lawyer
- Peter B. Krauser, American judge
- Peter A. Krauthamer (born 1957), American judge
- Peter Lambrinakos, Canadian police officer and corporate security executive
- Peter Landau (1935–2019), German jurist, legal historian and expert on canon law
- Peter Lassally (born 1932), German-born American executive
- Peter I. B. Lavan (1895–1988), American lawyer
- Peter Lavoy, American scholar and government official
- Peter D. Leary, American lawyer
- Peter K. Leisure (1929–2013), American judge
- Peter Livius (1739–1795), Chief Justice of Quebec
- Peter Lødrup (1932–2010), Norwegian legal scholar and judge
- Peter Lopez (1949–2010), American attorney
- Peter Löw (born 1960), German lawyer and entrepreneur
- Peter Low, Singaporean lawyer
- Peter Lucido (born 1960), American lawyer and politician
- Peter J. Maassen (born 1955), American judge
- Peter Magowan (1762–1810), Canadian politician
- Peter L. Malkin (born 1934), American lawyer and real estate investor
- Peter Manigault (1731–1773), American attorney and legislator
- Peter Marcuse (1928–2022), German-American lawyer and professor
- Peter Mbah (born 1972), Nigerian maritime lawyer, financial analyst, and politician
- Peter McAulay (1932–1995), Australian federal police commissioner
- Peter McClellan, Australian judge
- Peter McCormick (born 1952), British lawyer
- Peter McCoy (1888–1958), American attorney
- Peter McInerney (1927–2014), Australian Supreme Court judge
- Peter J. McQuillan (1929–2019), American judge and jurist
- Peter Merideth, American attorney and politician
- Peter J. Messitte (1941–2025), American judge
- Peter Metge, Irish politician and judge
- Peter Milliken (born 1946), Canadian lawyer and politician
- Peter Mond, 4th Baron Melchett (1948–2018), English farmer, jurist and politician
- Peter Morey, American attorney general
- Peter Mutton (c. 1565–1637), Welsh lawyer and politician
- Peter Nanfuri (1942–2023), Ghanaian police officer
- Peter Neronha (born 1963), American lawyer
- Peter Neufeld (born 1950), American attorney
- Peter Newsham, Chief of Police of the Metropolitan Police Department of the District of Columbia
- Peter Nickles (born 1938), American lawyer
- Peter Nicolaï (born 1947), Dutch lawyer and politician
- Peter Nobel (born 1931), Swedish lawyer
- Peter J. Notaro (1935–2014), American jurist
- Peter Nwaoduah, Nigerian security agent head
- Peter Olcott (1733–1808), American judge
- Peter Ørebech (1948–2024), Norwegian legal scholar
- Peter Pace (born 1945), 16th chairman of the Joint Chiefs of Staff
- Peter Panuthos (born 1943), American judge
- Peter Penlington (1932–2025), New Zealand lawyer and judge
- Peter N. Perretti Jr. (1931–2016), American lawyer
- Peter Pitegoff, American legal scholar
- Peter W. Princi (1915–1984), American judge
- Peter Quinlan (born 1970), Australian judge
- Peter Reichensperger (1810–1892), German jurist
- Peter Ridgeway, Australian lawyer
- Peter Ritchie, Canadian lawyer
- P. Frederick Rothermel (1850–1929), American lawyer
- Peter B. Rutledge, American attorney
- Peter O. Sathre (1876–1968), American judge
- Peter Savaryn (1926–2017), Ukrainian-born Canadian lawyer
- Peter Schey (1947–2024), American lawyer
- Peter Schutz, South African judge
- Peter M. Shane, American legal scholar and writer
- Peter C. Shannon (1821–1899), American judge
- Peter Shivute (born 1963), Namibian judge
- Peter N. Silvestri (born 1957), American lawyer
- Peter Skelton (born 1939), New Zealand judge and commissioner
- Peter Sloly (born 1966), Canadian police officer
- Peter Smithwick (1937–2022), Irish judge
- Peter J. Spiro, American legal scholar
- Peter Platou Stabell (1908–1992), Norwegian barrister
- Peter Strzok (born 1970), FBI agent
- Péter Szalay (1960–2024), Hungarian jurist
- Peter Thornton (born 1946), British judge
- Peter Tilliol, Cumberland landowner, politician, and judge
- Peter Tomka (born 1956), Slovak judge
- Peter Trapski (1935–2025), New Zealand jurist
- Peter Trevers (died 1468), Irish lawyer and judge
- Peter Turney (1827–1903), American judge
- Peter Tyndall, Irish public official and former ombudsman
- Peter Underwood (1937–2014), Australian jurist and Governor of Tasmania
- Peter Urbach (1940–2011), German agent provocateur
- Peter Vallone Jr. (born 1961), American judge and lawyer
- Peter Aaron Van Dorn (1773–1837), American lawyer
- Peter van Schaack (1747–1832), American lawyer
- Peter Verniero (born 1959), American judge
- Peter Vickery (1949–2022), Australian judge
- Peter J. Wallison (born 1941), American attorney
- Peter N. Wasylyk (born 1957), American attorney
- Peter Waterworth (born 1957), British barrister and diplomat
- Peter Watt (born 1969), former General Secretary of the UK Labour Party
- Peter D. Welte (born 1965), American judge
- Peter Woodbury (1899–1970), American judge
- Peter Tuen-Ho Yang (born 1941), Taiwanese jurist
- Peter T. Zarella (born 1949), American judge
- Peter Zeidenberg, American trial lawyer
- Peter Zimroth (1943–2021), American lawyer

== Literature ==
- Peter Abbs (1942–2020), English poet and academic
- Peter Abrahams (born 1947), American crime fiction writer
- Peter Ackerman, American dramatist
- Peter Ackroyd (born 1949), English author
- Peter Adeleke, Nigerian-Canadian author and speaker
- Peter Afflerbach (born 1956), American literary academic
- Peter Allibond (c. 1560–1630), English translator
- Peter Allison, Australian writer
- Peter Altenberg (1859–1919), Austrian writer and poet
- Peter A. Angeles (1931–2004), American philosopher and atheist writer
- Peter Christen Asbjørnsen (1812–1885), Norwegian writer
- Peter Attia (born 1973), Canadian-American author
- Peter Bacho, American writer
- Peter Baida (1950–1999), American writer
- Peter Bakowski (born 1954), Australian poet
- Peter Balakian (born 1951), American poet
- Peter A. Balaskas, American writer
- Peter Bamm (1897–1975), German writer
- Peter F. Barth, American writer
- Peter Bayne (1830–1896), Scottish author
- Peter S. Beagle (born 1939), American novelist and screenwriter
- Peter Benchley (1940–2006), American author
- Peter Bently (born 1960) British children’s writer
- Peter Berek, American Shakespeare scholar
- Peter Berg (1937–2011), American writer
- Peter Biegen, American writer
- Peter Bladen (1922–2001), Australian poet
- Peter Blauner (born 1959), American novelist
- Peter Blomevenna (1466–1536), Carthusian writer
- Peter Blue Cloud (1933–2011), Canadian writer
- Peter Bowen (1945–2020), American writer
- Peter Brandvold (born 1963), American western fiction author
- Peter V. Brett (born 1973), American writer
- Peter C. Brinckerhoff (born 1952), American writer
- Peter Brinson (1920–1995), British writer
- Peter Brookesmith, British writer
- Peter Brown Hoffmeister, American writer
- Peter Buckman, English writer and literary agent
- Peter Burchard (1921–2004), American writer
- Peter Burra (1909–1937), British writer and critic
- Peter Caras (1941–2022), American illustrator
- Peter Carravetta (born 1951), Italian philosopher, poet, literary theorist and translator
- Peter Catalanotto (born 1959), American book illustrator
- Peter Cheyney (1896–1951), British writer
- Peter O. Chotjewitz (1934–2010), German writer, translator and lawyer
- Peter Clines (born 1969), American author
- Peter Clover (born 1952), English children’s book author and illustrator
- Peter Conradi, British author and journalist
- Peter J. Conradi (born 1945), British author and academic
- Peter Constantine (born 1963), British-American literary translator
- Peter Cooley (born 1940), American poet and professor
- Peter Corris (1942–2018), Australian writer
- Peter Craven, Australian literary critic
- Peter Crowther (born 1949), British writer, editor and publisher
- Peter Culley, Canadian poet and photographer
- Peter Darvill-Evans (born 1954), British writer
- Peter de Jonge (born 1954), American novelist
- Peter de Polnay (1906–1984), English novelist and non-fiction writer
- Peter de Zwaan (born 1944), Dutch writer
- Peter Demant (1918–2006), Soviet writer and essayist
- Peter A. Demeter (1875–1939), German bookbinder, printer and publisher
- Peter Demetz (1922–2024), American literary scholar
- Peter Dent (born 1938), English poet and editor
- P. T. Deutermann (born 1941), American novelist
- Peter Didsbury, English poet
- Peter Douthit (1936–2012), American poet and communalist
- Peter Dreyer (1939–1995), South African American writer
- Peter Dronke (1934–2020), German literary scholar
- Peter Drucker (1909–2005), American business consultant and author
- Peter du Sautoy (1912–1995), British publisher and editor
- Peter Dubé, Canadian writer
- Peter P. Dubrovsky (1754–1816), Russian bibliophile, diplomat, paleographer and collector of manuscripts and books
- Peter Economy (born 1944), American author
- Peter Elliot (born 1966), American writer and media personality
- Peter Elstob (1915–2002), British writer
- Peter Emshwiller (born 1959), American novelist
- Peter Englund (born 1957), Swedish author and historian
- Péter Esterházy (1950–2016), Hungarian author
- Peter Everett (1931–1999), British novelist and author
- Peter Everwine (1930–2018), American writer
- Peter Farquhar (1946–2015), British novelist, teacher and murder victim
- Peter Farrer (1926–2017), English tax inspector, author, and Cross-dresser
- Peter Fatomilola (born 1946), Nigerian dramatist, film actor, poet and playwright
- Peter Filkins (born 1958), American poet and literary scholar
- Peter H. Fogtdal, Danish novelist and poet
- Peter Folger, Colonial Era American poet
- Peter Fox-Penner, American author
- Peter France (born 1935), British academic and scholar of French literature
- P. H. Frimann, Norwegian-Danish poet
- Peter Fröberg Idling (born 1972), Swedish writer and literary critic
- Peter Gadol (born 1964), American author
- Peter Gaffney (born 1959), American writer and editor
- Peter Galbraith (born 1950), American author
- Peter Gammons (born 1945), American sportswriter
- Peter Germano (1913–1983), American author
- Peter Gethers, American novelist
- Peter B. Gillis (1952–2024), American comic book writer
- Peter Gilliver (born 1964), British lexicographer
- Peter Gillman, British writer
- Peter Gizzi, American poet
- Peter Goes (born 1968), Belgian author and illustrator
- Peter Goldsworthy, Australian writer
- Peter Golenbock (born 1946), American sportswriter
- Peter Goodall (born 1949), Australian academic and author
- Peter Gossage (1946–2016), New Zealand author and illustrator
- Peter Gosse (born 1938), German poet, prose author and essayist
- Peter Gouldthorpe (born 1954), Australian artist and author
- Peter Greave (1910–1977), English writer
- Peter Guttridge, English novelist and critic
- Peter Hacks (1928–2003), German playwright, author and essayist
- Peter Hamm (1937–2019), German writer and literary critic
- Peter Hammerschlag (1902–1942), Austrian writer and artist
- Peter Handke (born 1942), Austrian Nobel laureate novelist
- Peter Handrinos (1972–2014), American sportswriter
- Peter Hargitai (born 1947), Hungarian-American poet, author and translator
- Peter Harness, English writer
- Peter Heck (born 1941), American writer
- Peter Hedges (born 1962), American novelist and director
- Peter Andreas Heiberg (1758–1841), Danish-Norwegian author and philologist
- Peter Hepplewhite (born 1954), British author
- Peter Heylyn (1599–1662), English ecclesiastic and author
- Peter Høeg (born 1957), Danish writer
- Peter Uwe Hohendahl, American literary and intellectual historian
- Peter Hollindale, educationalist and literary critic
- Peter Hopkirk (1930–2014), British author
- Peter Hruby (1921–2017), Czech academic and writer
- Peter Huchel (1903–1981), German poet
- Peter Huchthausen (1939–2008), American novelist
- Peter Humblot (1779–1828), German book seller and publisher
- Péter Hunčík (born 1951), Hungarian-Slovak writer
- Peter Huxley-Blythe (1925–2013), British author and fascist
- Peter Jaroš (born 1940), Slovak writer
- Peter Jelavich (born 1954), American author and professor
- Peter Jukes (born 1960), British writer
- Peter Stephan Jungk (born 1952), Austrian-American writer
- Peter Kalifornsky (1911–1993), Alaska Native writer
- Peter Karoshi (born 1975), Austrian writer
- Peter J. Karthak (1943–2020), Nepalese writer
- Peter Kellogg, American dramatist
- Peter Kerry, British writer
- Peter Kingsley (born 1953), British philosophy author
- Peter Kitson, British academic and author
- Peter Klappert (born 1942), American poet
- Peter Knobler (born 1946), American writer
- Peter Kocan (born 1947), Australian author and poet
- Peter Kovačič Peršin, Slovenian writer and theologian
- Péter Kuczka (1923–1999), Hungarian writer and poet
- Peter Kurze (born 1955), German writer
- Peter Kurzeck (1943–2013), German author
- Peter B. Kyne (1880–1957), American novelist
- Peter Laird (born 1954), American comic book writer and artist
- Peter Laugesen (born 1942), Danish poet and translator
- Peter Lefcourt, American novelist
- Peter M. Lenkov (born 1964), Canadian writer, producer and author
- Peter Lovesey (1936–2025), British crime fiction writer
- Peter Lykke-Seest (1869–1948), Norwegian writer
- Peter Makuck (1940–2023), American poet
- Peter Mandel, American author of children’s books, journalist and essayist
- Peter Manseau (born 1974), American writer, religion scholar and museum curator
- Peter Manso (1940–2021), American writer and journalist
- Peter Manson, Scottish poet
- Peter Marginter (1934–2008), Austrian essayist and writer
- Peter Marren, British author and naturalist
- Peter Mathers (1931–2004), Australian author and playwright
- Peter Matthiessen (1927–2014), American novelist
- Peter McCambridge, Canadian literary scholar
- Peter McGehee (1955–1991), American dramatist
- Peter Meinke (born 1932), American poet and author
- Peter Milligan (born 1961), British writer
- Peter Morwood (1956–2025), Irish novelist and screenwriter
- Peter Anthony Motteux (1663–1718), English author, playwright, and translator
- Péter Nádas (born 1942), Hungarian writer
- Peter Nansen (1861–1918), Danish novelist, journalist and publisher
- Peter Narváez (1942–2011), Canadian writer and folklorist
- Peter Nazareth (born 1940), British literary critic and writer
- Peter Neagoe (1881–1960), American novelist
- Peter Solis Nery, Filipino writer and filmmaker
- Peter Neumeyer (born 1929), German-born American scholar, writer and academic
- Peter Nickowitz, American dramatist
- Peter Niesewand (1944–1983), South African writer and journalist
- Peter Ocko, American television writer and producer
- Peter Olausson (1971–2023), Swedish author
- Peter Olds (1944–2023), New Zealand poet
- Peter Oliva, Canadian novelist
- Peter Oresick (1955–2016), American writer
- Peter Orlovsky (1933–2010), American poet and actor
- Peter Orner, American writer
- Peter Orullian (born 1969), American fantasy author and musician
- Peter Oswald (born 1965), English playwright
- Peter Padfield (1932–2022), British author
- Peter K. Palangyo (1939–1993), Tanzanian novelist and diplomat
- Peter Parnall (born 1936), American artist and writer
- Peter Parnell (born 1953), American Broadway and Off-Broadway playwright, television writer, and children's book author
- Peter George Patmore (1786–1855), English author
- Peter Petreius (1570–1622), Swedish writer and diplomat
- Peter Pezzelli (born 1959), American novelist
- Peter Philipp (1971–2014), German writer, poet and comedian
- Peter Philp (1920–2006), Welsh dramatist
- Peter Pinney (1922–1992), Australian writer
- Peter Pišťanek (1960–2015), Slovak writer
- Peter Pohl (born 1940), Swedish writer and lecturer
- Peter Pook (1918–1978), British writer
- Peter Pouncey (1937–2023), British-American writer
- Peter Prince (born 1942), British novelist
- Peter Pugh (born 1943), British author
- Peter Quennell (1905–1993), English writer
- Peter Quilter, English playwright
- Peter Rabe (1921–1990), American writer
- Peter Ransley (born 1931), British screenwriter, playwright and novelist
- Peter Reading (1946–2011), English poet and author
- Peter Redgrove (1932–2003), British poet
- Peter Rezman (born 1956), Slovene poet, writer and playwright
- Peter Riley, English poet, essayist, and editor
- Peter Frederik Rist (1844–1926), Danish author
- Peter Rollins (born 1973), Northern Irish writer
- Peter Rosegger (1843–1918), Austrian writer and poet
- Peter Rosei (born 1946), Austrian literary writer
- Peter Rosenkrantz Johnsen (1857–1929), Norwegian journalist and author
- Peter Ruber (1940–2014), American book publisher
- Peter Rühmkorf (1929–2008), German writer
- Peter Rushforth (1945–2005), English teacher and novelist
- Peter Sagal (born 1965), American humorist, writer and host
- Peter Sanderson (born 1952), American comic book critic
- Peter Sanger (born 1943), Canadian poet and writer
- Peter Sansom (born 1958), British poet
- Peter H. Sarno (born 1954), American writer and teacher
- Peter Sauder, Canadian screenwriter
- Peter Schechter, American writer
- Peter Schjeldahl (1942–2022), American art critic, poet and educator
- Peter Schneider (1940–2026), German writer
- Peter Schreck, Australian writer
- Peter Schweizer (born 1964), American writer
- Peter Scupham (1933–2022), British poet
- Peter Seabrook (1935–2022), British gardening writer
- Peter Seaton (1942–2010), American poet
- Peter Seeberg (1925–1999), Danish novelist and playwright
- Peter Seewald (born 1954), German journalist and writer
- Peter Seidel (1926–2025), American architect-planner turned writer
- Peter Sekuless, Australian author and lobbyist
- Peter Selgin (born 1957), American author
- Peter Semolič (born 1967), Slovene poet and translator
- Peter Shaffer (1926–2016), English playwright and screenwriter
- Peter D. Sieruta (1958–2012), American writer and book critic
- Peter Sims (born 1976), American author and entrepreneur
- Peter Sirr (born 1960), Irish poet
- Peter Sís (born 1949), Czech-born American illustrator and writer
- Peter Skrzynecki, Australian poet
- Peter Smalley (born 1943), Australian-born author
- Peter Snejbjerg, Danish comic book artist
- Peter Sotos (born 1960), American writer and musician
- Peter Souter, British writer
- Peter Spence (born 1944), English journalist and writer
- Peter Spiegelman, American novelist
- Peter Spier (1927–2017), Dutch-American writer and illustrator
- Peter Stamm (born 1963), Swiss writer
- Peter Stanford (born 1961), English writer, editor, journalist and presenter
- Peter Steele (1939–2012), Australian poet
- Peter Steigerwald, American comic book artist
- Peter Steinfeld, American screenwriter
- Peter Stiff (1933–2016), South African author
- Peter Straub (1943–2022), American novelist and poet
- Peter Straughan (born 1968), English dramatist, screenwriter and short-story writer
- Peter Streckfus (born 1969), American poet
- Peter Suhrkamp (1891–1959), German publisher
- Peter Swanson (born 1968), American novelist
- Peter Swirski (born 1966), Canadian novelist and literary critic
- Peter Telep (born 1965), American screenwriter
- Peter Terson (1932–2021), British playwright
- Peter Theroux, American writer and translator
- Peter Adam Thrasher (1923–2018), British biographer and writer
- Peter Tieryas (born 1979), American writer
- Peter Tinniswood (1936–2003), British writer
- Peter Tomasi (born 1967), American comic book editor and writer
- Peter Trachtenberg, American writer
- Peter Trower (1930–2017), Canadian poet and novelist
- Peter G. Tsouras (born 1948), American writer
- Peter Turrini (born 1944), Austrian playwright
- Peter Tyrrell (1916–1967), Irish memoirist and activist
- Peter Unwin (born 1932), British writer and diplomat
- Peter Usborne (1937–2023), British publisher
- Peter van Diest, Dutch writer
- Peter van Dongen (born 1966), Dutch writer
- Peter van Gestel (1937–2019), Dutch writer
- Peter Van Greenaway (1929–1988), British novelist
- Peter van Straaten (1935–2016), Dutch cartoonist and comics artist
- Peter Vansittart (1920–2008), English writer
- Peter van Toorn (1944–2021), Canadian poet
- Peter Verhelst (born 1962), Flemish writer
- Peter Viereck (1916–2006), American poet
- Peter Viertel (1920–2007), German author
- Peter von Matt (1937–2025), Swiss philologist and author
- Peter von Tramin (1932–1981), Austrian writer
- Peter von Ziegesar (born 1952), American writer
- Peter Vronsky, Canadian writer and film director
- Peter J. Wacks, American fiction and game writer
- Peter Waldor, American poet
- Peter Wawerzinek (born 1954), German artist and writer
- Peter Wayner, American writer
- Peter Wehner (born 1961), American writer
- Peter Weiss (1916–1982), Swedish-German playwright and author
- Peter Whalley (1921–2007), Canadian caricaturist, cartoonist, illustrator and sculptor
- Peter Whigham (1925–1987), English poet
- Peter Wildeblood (1923–1999), British-Canadian journalist, novelist, playwright and gay rights campaigner
- Pete Woods (born 1971), an American comic book artist
- Peter Woods (journalist) (1930–1995), British journalist, reporter and newsreader
- Peter Yeldham (1927–2022), Australian screenwriter
- Peter Zajac (born 1946), Slovak literary critic and politician
- Peter Zec, German design consultant
- Peter Zeihan (born 1973), American author and geopolitical analyst
- Peter Zeindler (1934–2023), Swiss writer

== Military ==
- Peter (curopalates) (died 602), Byzantine general and brother of Emperor Maurice
- Peter (stratopedarches), Byzantine eunuch general
- Peter Abbott (1942–2015), Royal Navy admiral
- Peter Abigail (born 1948), Australian Army officer
- Peter Acland (1902–1993), British soldier
- Peter H. Allabach (1824–1892), Union Army officer
- Peter Aplin (1753–1817), English admiral
- Peter Arnison (born 1940), Australian Army officer
- Peter Ashmore (1921–2002), English naval officer and courtier
- Peter Ayerst (1920–2014), British World War II flying ace
- Peter Badcoe (1934–1967), Australian Victoria Cross recipient
- Peter Bairnsfather-Cloete (1917–1942), South African cricketer and South African Army officer
- Peter Bairsto (1926–2017), Royal Air Force Air Marshal
- Peter Bartholomew (died 1099), French soldier and mystic
- Peter Bartram (born 1961), Danish general
- Peter Bellinger (1726–1813), American military commander
- Peter Kemmis Betty (1916–2016), British Army officer
- Peter Blagg (1918–1943), English cricketer and soldier
- Peter Blankenborg Prydz (1776–1827), Norwegian military officer
- Peter Blay, Ghanaian military officer and the Chief of Defense Staff
- Peter Blunt (1923–2003), British Army general
- Peter M. Boehm (1845–1914), US Army Civil War Honor of Medal recipiente
- Peter Bonnet (1936–2023), British Army officer
- Peter J. Boylan (1936–2023), United States Army general
- Peter Bridgeman (1933–2013), British army officer
- Peter Malam Brothers (1917–2008), Royal Air Force fighter pilot
- Peter Brownback, US Army officer
- Peter G. Burbules (born 1931), United States Army general
- Peter Button (1929–1987), New Zealand aviator
- Peter Carpenter (1891–1971), Welsh fighter ace in World War I
- Peter Casserly (1898–2005), Australian soldier
- Peter Churchill (1909–1972), British SOE officer
- Peter Compston (1915–2000), Royal Navy admiral
- Peter Cotton (1839–?), American soldier
- Peter K. Cullins (1928–2012), American naval admiral
- Peter Cundy (1916–2005), Royal Air Force officer
- Peter Dannenberg (1930–2015), Russian general
- Peter de la Billière (born 1934), British Army officer
- Peter de Neumann (1917–1972), British Royal Navy officer
- Peter Deriabin (1921–1992), KGB officer
- Peter Gerald Charles Dickens (1917–1987), Royal Navy officer
- Peter Dingemans (1935–2015), Royal Navy officer
- Peter Dmytruk (1920–1943), Canadian Air Force officer
- Peter Downward (1924–2014), British Army general
- Peter Dowson (1915–2004), English cricketer and British Army officer
- Peter Drissell (born 1955), Royal Air Force officer
- Peter Ludwig du Moulin (1681–1756), Prussian general
- Peter Duffell (born 1939), British Army general
- Peter Le Barbier Duplessis (c. 1779–1817), first marshal of Louisiana
- Peter Düttmann (1923–2001), German World War II fighter pilot
- Peter Earnest (1934–2022), American intelligence officer
- Peter Egerton-Warburton (1813–1889), English army major, police officer and explorer
- Peter Clarkson Ellmaker (1813–1890), Union Army officer
- Peter Elwelu (born 1966), Ugandan military officer
- Peter Engbrecht (1923–1991), Canadian Second World War veteran
- Peter Essen (1772–1844), Baltic German military personnel
- Peter Everson, British Army general
- Peter Faidoo, Ghanaian naval personnel
- Peter Fesler, U. S. Air Force general
- Peter Francisco (1760–1831), American blacksmith and soldier
- Peter Franklyn (born 1946), Royal Navy officer
- Peter Furniss (1919–2005), Royal Air Force air marshal
- Peter Gadet (c. 1958–2019), Sudanese general and SPLA commander
- Peter Gansevoort (1749–1812), American army officer
- Peter Garretson, U. S. Air Force officer and writer on space policy and strategy
- Peter Garvin, U. S. Navy admiral
- Peter Gautier (born 1965), U. S. Coast Guard admiral
- Peter Gemeinder (1891–1931), Nazi oficial
- Peter Gillett (1913–1989), British Army general
- Peter Gillmore (1905–1996), British Royal Air Force officer
- Peter Girard (1918–2011), American aviator
- Peter Goggins (1894–1917), British army soldier
- Peter Graaff (1936–2014), Dutch military officer
- Peter Gration (born 1932), Australian Army officer
- Peter Gretton (1912–1992), Royal Navy Vice Admiral
- Peter M. Guenette (1948–1968), United States Army soldier
- Peter Gumataotao, United States Navy admiral
- Peter Gwynn-Jones (1940–2010), British officer of arms
- Peter Hagendorf, German mercenary soldier in the Thirty Years' War
- Peter Hagerstein, 19th-century Finnish sailor and soldier
- Peter V. Hagner (1815–1893), Union Army officer
- Peter Hammersley (1928–2020), English Royal Navy officer
- Peter Handcock (1868–1902), Australian Army officer
- Peter Hederstedt (born 1963), Swedish officer
- Peter Hellings (1916–1990), Royal Marines general
- Peter Heywood (1772–1831), British naval officer
- Peter Hill-Norton (1915–2004), Royal Navy officer
- Peter Högl (1897–1945), German SS officer
- Peter Horsfall (1930–2021), British Army officer
- Peter Horsley (1921–2001), Royal Air Force Air Marshal
- Peter Imbert, Baron Imbert (1933–2017), Metropolitan Police Service Commissioner (1987–1993)
- Peter Inge, Baron Inge (1935–2022), British Army officer
- Peter Jaquett, officer in the American Revolution
- Peter Kalden (1923–1996), German fighter ace and Knight's Cross recipient
- Peter Kaptzevich (1772–1840), Russian general
- Peter Kassig (1988–2014), American aid worker
- Peter Lacy (1678–1751), Russian military commander
- Peter Lauritzen (born 1959), Danish civil servant
- Peter Lawless (1891–1945), British author, rugby player, soldier and war correspondent
- Peter Le Cheminant (1920–2018), British Royal Air Force officer
- Peter le Cheminant (1926–2006), British civil servant
- Peter Leahy (born 1952), Australian general
- Peter Lecount (1794–1852), British Royal Navy officer
- Peter Lefevre, British flying ace of World War II
- Peter C. Lemon (born 1950), American soldier
- Peter Leng (1925–2009), British Army general
- Peter Raymond Leuchars (1921–2009), British Army general
- Peter Lieb (born 1974), German military historian
- Peter Lumsden (1829–1918), British general
- Peter Bogstad Mandel (1924–1945), Danish resistance member
- Peter Masefield (1914–2006), British aeronautical engineer, journalist and industrialist
- Peter McAleese (1942–2024), British army soldier and writer
- Peter Melander, Graf von Holzappel (1589–1648), German commander during the Thirty Years' War
- Peter Melvill (1803–1895), British military officer
- Peter Metelerkamp (1918–1942), South African World War II flying ace
- Peter Monie (1877–1946), British colonial administrator
- Peter Mtuze (born 1941), South African civil servant
- Peter Nambundunga (1947–2019), Namibian military commander
- Peter V. Neffenger, former United States Coast Guard Admiral
- Peter Mbogo Njiru, Kenyan general
- Peter Cirimwami Nkuba (died 2025), Congolese military officer and governor
- Peter George Olenchuk (1922–2000), United States Army general
- Peter Ong, Singaporean civil servant
- Peter Joseph Osterhaus (1823–1917), German-American Union Army general and diplomat
- Peter Lotharius Oxholm (1753–1827), Danish army officer and governor-general
- Peter Douglas Herbert Raymond Pelly (1904–1980), Royal Navy Rear Admiral
- Peter Pertschuk (1923–1993), French espionage agent
- Peter Grant Peterkin (born 1947), British Army general and Sergeant at Arms
- Peter Philpott (1915–1988), Royal Air Force Air-Vice Marshal
- Peter Pitchlynn (1806–1881), Choctaw military and political leader
- Peter Polovtsov (1874–1964), Russian general
- Peter Puget (1765–1822), British naval officer and explorer
- Peter Rafferty (1845–1910), American soldier and Medal of Honor recipient
- Peter Ramsbotham (1919–2010), British diplomat and colonial administrator
- Peter Ratcliffe (born 1948), British Army officer
- Peter Raw (1922–1988), Australian military pilot and officer
- Peter Rheinberger (1831–1893), Liechtenstein captain and politician
- Peter Riedel (1905–1998), German gliding champion
- Peter Rodd (1904–1968), British soldier
- Peter Rothwell (1920–2010), Royal Air Force officer
- Peter Ruddock (born 1954), British Royal Air Force air marshal
- Peter Salem (1750–1816), American Revolutionary War soldier
- Peter Sauerbruch (1913–2010), World War II German Army officer
- Peter Schiønning (1732–1813), Danish naval officer
- Peter Schnitler (1690–1751), Danish/Norwegian jurist and military officer
- Peter Schoomaker (born 1946), American retired Army general
- Peter Schuyler (1710–1762), American colonist
- Peter Scratchley (1835–1885), Commissioner for Great Britain in New Guinea
- Peter Shortland, English naval officer and hydrographic surveyor
- Peter Sibbald (1928–1994), British Army officer
- Peter Spoden (1921–2021), German Air Force pilot
- Peter Squire (1945–2018), Royal Air Force Air Chief Marshal
- Peter Stallard (1915–1995), British colonial administrator
- Peter Frederik Steinmann (1812–1894), Danish Officer and War Minister
- Peter Still (1801–1868), American former slave
- Peter Stockwell (born 1954), New Zealand air force marshal
- Peter Sype (1841–1923), American Civil War Medal of Honor recipient
- Peter Talleri (born 1957), United States Marine Corps general
- Peter Tazelaar (1920–1993), Dutch resistant member
- Peter Tekeli (1720–1792), Russian general-in-chief of Serb origin
- Peter Terry (1926–2017), Royal Air Force Air Chief Marshall
- Peter Tomich (1893–1941), US Navy Medal of Honor recipient
- Peter Tordenskjold (1690–1720), Royal Dano-Norwegian Navy officer
- Peter E. Traub (1864–1956), American Army general
- Peter Troake (1908–1997), Canadian mariner
- Peter Twiss (1921–2011), British test pilot
- Peter van Uhm (born 1955), Dutch general
- Peter Vanneck (1922–1999), British Royal Navy officer, fighter pilot, engineer, stockbroker and politician
- Peter Vasely (born 1967), U. S. Navy admiral
- Peter Vaughan-Fowler (1923–1994), officer of the Royal Air Force
- Peter von Baranoff (1843–1924), Baltic German military officer and statesman
- Peter Karl Ott von Bátorkéz (c. 1738–1809), Austrian general
- Peter von Heydebreck (1889–1934), German soldier and SA general
- Peter von Scholten (1784–1854), Danish colonial governor
- Peter Yorck von Wartenburg (1904–1944), German resistance fighter
- Peter Voss, commander of the Crematoria of Auschwitz-Birkenau
- Peter Vroman (1736–1793), American Revolutionary War soldier
- Peter Walls (1927–2010), Rhodesian general
- Peter M. Weiser (1781–1813), American soldier
- Peter Werfft (1904–1970), Austrian chemist and Luftwaffe fighter ace in World War II
- Peter Woodhead (born 1939), Royal Navy admiral
- Peter Cavanaugh Woods (1819–1898), Confederate military officer
- Peter Frederik Wulff (1774–1842), Danish naval officer
- Peter Wykeham (1915–1995), Royal Air Force Air Marshal
- Peter Zschech (1918–1943), German submariner
- Peter B. Zwack, United States Army officer and diplomatic attaché

== Nobility ==
- Peter (diplomat) (fl. 860s–870s), Bulgarian noble
- Peter (judge royal) (fl. 1183), nobleman in the Kingdom of Hungary
- Peter, Constable of Portugal (1429–1466), third Grand Master of the Order of Saint Benedict of Aviz
- Peter, Count of Dammartin (died 1106), son of Hugh I
- Peter, Duke of Coimbra (1392–1449), Portuguese prince of the House of Aviz
- Peter, Duke of the Romans, 11th century Roman consul
- Peter, King of Hungary (born 1010s), King of Hungary
- Peter, son of Petenye (fl. c. 1400), Hungarian lord
- Peter, son of Töre (died 1213), Hungarian lord, served as judge royal in 1198
- Peter I, Count of Alençon (1251–1284), Count of Perche, son of Louis IX of France
- Peter I of Aragon and Pamplona (c. 1068–1104), king of Aragon and Pamplona
- Peter I of Arborea (d. 1214), king of Sardinia
- Peter I of Bulgaria (died 970), emperor of Bulgaria
- Peter I of Courtenay (1126–1183), French noble
- Peter I of Cyprus (1328–1369), king of Cyprus
- Peter I of Portugal (1320–1367), king of Portugal
- Peter I of Serbia (1844–1921) king of Serbia
- Peter of Castile (1334–1369), king of Castile and León
- Peter of Greece and Denmark (1908–1980), prince
- Peter of Montenegro (1889–1932), prince
- Peter of Yugoslavia (born 1980), prince
- Peter the Great (1672–1725), first Russian emperor
- Peter II of Russia (1715–1730), third Russian emperor
- Peter III of Russia (1728–1762), seventh Russian emperor
- Peter Nikolaevich of Russia (1864–1931), Russian royal
- Peter of Oldenburg (1812–1881), Russian royal
- Peter Alexandrovich of Oldenburg (1868–1924), Russian royal
- Peter Antonovich of Brunswick (1745–1798), Russian royal
- Peter August of Saxe-Coburg and Gotha (1866–1934), prince
- Peter Ardern, Chief Baron of the Exchequer
- Peter Baden-Powell, 2nd Baron Baden-Powell (1913–1962), British Baron
- Peter Bő, Hungarian nobleman
- Peter Csetneki, Hungarian nobleman
- Peter de Maulay, 13th-century English baron and sheriff
- Peter de Mauley, 1st Baron Mauley, 13th—14th century English noble
- Peter de Rivaux, Poitevin courtier at the court of Henry III of England
- Peter de Valognes, 11th-century Norman nobleman
- Peter Estenberg (1686–1740), Swedish linguist
- Peter Fadrique, count of Salona
- Peter FitzReginald, 13th-14th century English noble
- Peter Grenfell, 2nd Baron St Just (1922–1984), English peer
- Peter Hahn (1799–1873), Russian nobleman
- Peter Kaeo (1836–1880), Hawaiian noble and politician of the Kingdom of Hawaiʻi
- Peter Köbölkúti, Hungarian nobleman
- Peter Penny, 2nd Viscount Marchwood (1912–1979), British soldier, businessman and hereditary peer
- Peter Petrovich, Tsarevich of Russia
- Peter Rede, Member of the Parliament of England
- Peter Saltonstall, English courtier and lawyer
- Peter Samuel, 4th Viscount Bearsted (1911–1996), English peer and corporate director
- Peter Spani, 15th-century Albanian noble
- Peter Tempesta, Count of Eboli, Count of Gravina
- Peter Vannes, 16th-century Italian Catholic churchman; Dean of Salisbury
- Peter von Biron (1724–1800), Duke of Courland and Semigallia
- Peter von Hagenbach (c. 1420–1474), Alsatian knight and ruler
- Peter Vitus von Quosdanovich (1738–1802), Austrian Empire general
- Peter Wentworth-Fitzwilliam, 8th Earl Fitzwilliam (1910–1948), British nobleman and peer
- Peter Whitmer Jr. (1809–1836), Book of Mormon witness
- Peter Wittgenstein (1769–1843), German prince

== Politics ==
- Peter Abbarno (born 1975), American attorney, businessman, and politician
- Peter J. Abbate Jr. (born 1949), American politician
- Peter A. Abeles, American politician
- Peter Abetz (born 1952), Australian politician
- Peter Ala Adjetey (1931–2008), Ghanaian politician and lawyer
- Peter H. Adolphson (born 1957), American politician
- Peter Aduja (1920–2007), American politician
- Péter Ágh (born 1982), Hungarian politician
- Peter Agius (born 1979), Maltese politician
- Péter Ágoston (1874–1925), Hungarian politician
- Peter Ainsworth (1956–2021), British politician
- Peter Ainsworth (Whig politician) (1790–1870), British politician
- Peter Airey (1865–1950), Australian politician
- Peter Akpatason (born 1964), Nigerian politician
- Peter Albach (born 1956), German politician
- Peter Aldous (born 1961), British conservative politician
- Peter Usman Aliu (died 2014), Nigerian politician
- Peter Althin (born 1941), Swedish attorney and politician
- Peter Altmaier (born 1958), German politician
- Peter Altmeier (1899–1977), German politician
- Peter Alvares, Indian politician
- Peter Ammon (born 1952), German diplomat
- Peter Andren (1946–2007), Australian politician
- Peter Angelsen (born 1935), Norwegian politician
- Peter Antal (born 1972), Slovak politician
- Peter Anthony (born 1971), Malaysian politician, singer and businessman
- Peter Edick Omondi Anyanga, Kenyan politician
- Peter Apo, American politician
- Peter C. Appling (1822–1908), American politician
- Peter Aumer (born 1976), German politician
- Peter K. Babalas (1922–1987), American politician
- Peter Baco (born 1945), Slovak politician
- Peter Baillie (c. 1771–1811), British West Indies merchant and Whig politician
- Peter Njoroge Baiya, Kenyan politician
- Peter Baltz (1831–c. 1903), American politician
- Peter Barbour (1925–1996), Australian diplomat
- Peter Barca (born 1955), American politician
- Peter Barlerin, American diplomat
- Peter Barnabas Barrow (c. 1840–1906), American politician
- Peter Barter (1940–2022), Papua New Guinean politician
- Peter Bartzen (1857–1934), American businessman and politician
- Peter Batchelor (born 1950), Australian politician
- Peter Baume (born 1935), Australian politician
- Peter Bawden (1929–1991), Canadian politician
- Peter H. Behr (1915–1997), American politician
- Peter D. Bear (born 1952), American politician
- Peter Beattie (born 1952), Australian politician
- Peter Beazley (1922–2004), British businessman and politician
- Peter Beckingham (born 1949), British retired diplomat
- Peter Bedford (born 1986), British politician
- Peter B. Bensinger (1936–2025), American government official
- Peter Bercovitch (1879–1942), Canadian politician
- Peter A. A. Berle (1937–2007), American politician
- Peter Besseling (born 1970), Australian politician
- Peter Bessell (1921–1985), British Liberal Party politician
- Peter Bethlenfalvy, Canadian businessman and politician
- Peter Beuth (born 1967), German politician
- Peter Bevan-Baker (born 1962), Scottish-Canadian politician
- Peter J. Biondi (1942–2011), American politician
- Peter R. Biondo (1916–1997), American politician
- Peter Biroš (1950–2024), Slovak politician
- Peter Bixby, American politician
- Peder Björk (born 1975), Swedish politician
- Peter Bjornson, Canadian politician
- Peter Blacker (born 1941), Australian politician
- Peter Campbell Blaicher (1835–1900), mayor of Hamilton, Ontario
- Peter Blaikie (born 1937), Canadian lawyer and politician
- Peter Blaker (1922–2009), British politician
- Peter Bleser (born 1952), German politician
- Peter Blount, English politician
- Peter Blumenrath (born 1984), German politician
- Peter Blute (born 1956), American politician
- Peter Boakye-Ansah (1949–2018), Ghanaian politician
- Peter Bock (born 1948), American politician
- Péter Ákos Bod (born 1951), Hungarian politician and economist
- Peter W. Bodde (born 1954), American diplomat
- Peter Bodenmann (born 1952), Swiss politician
- Peter Boehm (born 1954), Canadian diplomat
- Peter Boehringer (born 1969), German politician
- Peter Bohnhof (born 1962), German politician
- Peter Bone (born 1952), British politician
- Peter Boroffka (1932–1999), German politician
- Péter Boross (born 1928), Hungarian politician
- Peter Borthwick (1804–1852), British politician and news editor
- Peter Bosa (1927–1998), Canadian politician
- Peter Bossman (born 1955), Ghanaian-born Slovenian politician
- Peter Lam Both, South Sudanese diplomat
- Peter Bottomley (born 1944), British politician
- Peter Bouck Borst (1826–1882), American politician
- Peter Bowman (born 1937), American politician
- Peter Bowness, Baron Bowness (born 1943), British politician
- Peter Boyers (born 1962), Solomon Islands politician
- Peter Bøyesen (1799–1867), Norwegian businessman and politician
- Peter Boykin (born 1977), American political candidate, podcaster, and author
- Peter Božič (1932–2009), Slovenian writer, playwright, journalist, and politician
- Peter Bragdon, American politician
- Peter Braid (born 1964), Canadian businessman and politician
- Peter Brixtofte (1949–2016), Danish politician
- Peter Broun (1797–1846), Australian politician
- Peter Brownell (born 1948), American politician
- Peter Bruinvels (born 1950), British politician
- Peter S. Brunstetter (born 1956), American politician
- Peter Brush (1901–1984), Northern Irish politician
- Peter Daniel Bruun (1796–1864), Danish politician and lawyer
- Peter Büchel (1872–1958), Liechtensteiner civil servant and politician
- Peter Bunting (born 1960), Jamaican politician
- Peter Buol (1873–1939), American mayor
- Peter Bürgel (born 1953), German politician
- Peter Burian (born 1959), Slovak diplomat
- Peter Burleigh (born 1942), American diplomat
- Peter Burnet, Canadian politician
- Peter Burrowes (1753–1841), Irish barrister and politician
- Peter Burtniak (1925–2004), Canadian politician
- Peter M. Busch (1934–1986), American politician
- Peter "Pete" Buttigieg (born 1982), American politician
- Peter Buysrogge (born 1976), Belgian politician
- Peter Cacchione (1897–1947), American politician
- Peter John Calderon (born 1961), Filipino politician
- Peter M. Callan (1894–1965), American politician
- Peter Callanan (1935–2009), Irish politician
- Peter G. Callas (1926–2022), American politician
- Peter Calvocoressi (1912–2010), British lawyer, Liberal politician, and historian
- Peter G. Camden (1801–1873), American politician
- Peter Camejo (1939–2008), Venezuelan American politician
- Peter Camiel (1910–1991), American politician
- Peter Cammarano (born 1977), American mayor
- Peter Capano, American politician
- Peter Cardy (born 1947), British non-governmental professional
- Peter Carington, 6th Baron Carrington (1919–2018), British politician
- Peter Carleton (1755–1828), American politician
- Peter Carlisle (born 1952), American politician and attorney
- Peter Harry Carstensen (born 1947), German politician
- Peter Carteret, American colonial governor
- Peter Caruana (born 1956), Gibraltarian lawyer and politician
- Peter John Cashin (1890–1977), Canadian politician
- Peter L. Cashman (born 1936), American politician
- Peter F. Causey (1801–1871), American politician
- Peter A. Cavicchia (1879–1967), American politician
- Alan Peter Cayetano, Filipino politician and current speaker of the House of Representatives
- Peter Chaba (1903–1964), Canadian politician
- Peter R. Chacon (1925–2014), American politician
- Peter Chalke, English businessman and conservative politician
- Peter B. Champagne (1845–1891), American businessman and politician
- Peter Chin, New Zealand mayor
- Peter Chintala (died 2019), Zambian politician and diplomat
- Peter Chol Wal, South Sudanese politician
- Peter Christie (1846–1933), Canadian politician
- Peter G. Christie (1941–2021), Canadian accountant and politician
- Peter Cianchette (born 1961), American politician
- Peter Cirillo, South Sudanese politician
- Peter Hersleb Classen (1738–1825), Norwegian-Danish statesman
- Peter Clavelle (born 1949), American politician
- Peter H. Claussen (1894–1990), American politician
- Peter A. Cleary (1873–1940), American politician
- Peter Cleary (1950–1976), Irish Republican
- Peter Cleeland (1938–2007), Australian politician
- Peter "Chap" Cleere (born 1983), Irish politician and hurler
- Peter Cline Buffington (1814–1875), first mayor of Huntington, West Virginia
- Peter Colijn (died 1535), Dutch statesman
- Peter Collecott (born 1950), British diplomat
- Peter Colleton (1635–1694), English politician and slave trader
- Peter Colotka, (1925–2019), Slovak academic, lawyer, and politician
- Peter Core, Australian public servant and policymaker
- Peter Corroon (born 1964), American politician
- Peter Corterier (1936–2017), German politician
- Peter Cosgrove (born 1947), Governor General of Australia (2014–2019)
- Peter E. Costello (1854–1935), American politician
- Peter Costigan (1935–2002), Australian politician
- Peter J. Costigan (1930–2015), American politician
- Peter Courthorpe, Irish politician
- Peter Cownie (born 1980), American politician
- Peter Craine (1931–2003), British baker and politician
- Peter Crisp (born 1954), Australian politician
- Peter Crompton (c. 1760–1833), English physician, political radical, and brewer
- Péter Cseresnyés (born 1960), Hungarian politician
- Péter Csizi (born 1982), Hungarian politician
- Peter Cumming, Australian politician
- Peter Hood Ballantine Cumming (1910–1988), American politician
- Peter T. Curtenius (1734–1798), American politician
- Peter Daane (1835–1914), American politician
- Peter Daka (born 1960), Zambian politician
- Peter J. Dalessandro (1918–1997), US Army Medal of Honor recipient and politician
- Peter Daley (1950–2022), American politician
- Peter Mohr Dam (1898–1968), Faroe Islands politician
- Peter Danckert (1940–2022), German politician
- Peter Daniell, English politician
- Peter Danielsson (born 1974), Swedish politician
- Peter Daou (born 1965), American political activist and jazz musician
- Peter David (politician), Grenadian politician
- Peter de Groot (born 1980), member of the Dutch House of Representatives
- Peter de la Mare, Member of the Parliament of England
- Peter de Loughry (1868–1931), Irish politician
- Peter J. De Muth (1892–1993), American politician
- Peter De Roover (born 1962), Belgian politician
- Peter de Savary (1944–2022), British businessman and politician
- Peter Jon de Vos (1938–2008), American diplomat
- Peter K. De Vuono, American politician and lawyer
- Peter Olaf Debes (1845–1914), Norwegian politician
- Peter Debnam (born 1954), Australian politician
- Peter Dedecker (born 1983), Belgian politician
- Peter DeFazio (born 1947), American politician
- Peter DeGraaf (born 1957), American politician
- Peter Franz Ignaz Deiters (1804–1861), German lawyer and politician
- Peter Delamothe (1904–1973), Australian politician
- Peter Delanoy, American politician
- Peter Delefes, Canadian politician
- Peter Demong, Canadian municipal politician
- Peter den Oudsten (born 1951), Dutch politician
- Peter Denis (1713–1778), English naval officer and MP
- Peter Denoyelles (1766–1829), American politician
- Peter Desnoyers (1800–1880), American businessman and politician
- Peter J. Desnoyers (1772–1846), businessman and politician
- Peter V. Deuster (1831–1904), American congressman
- Peter Deutsch (born 1957), American politician
- Peter A. Dey (1825–1911), American politician
- Peter Diamondstone (1934–2017), American politician
- Peter Dodd (born 1953), Australian politician
- Peter S. Dokuchitz (1928–2014), American politician
- Peter H. Dominick (1915–1981), American politician
- Peter J. Dooling (1857–1931), American politician
- Péter Doszpot (born 1962), Hungarian politician
- Peter Doucette (1954–2019), Canadian politician
- Peter Dowd (born 1957), British Labour politician
- Peter Dowding (born 1943), Australian politician
- Peter Dowling (born 1961), Australian politician
- Peter Downing, Canadian politician and Alberta separatist
- Peter M. Dox (1813–1891), American politician
- Peter Albert Dueck (1923–2015), Canadian politician
- Peter Durant, American politician
- Peter Durack (1926–2008), Australian politician
- Peter Durant, American politician
- Peter Dutton (born 1970), Australian politician
- Peter Dyck (1946–2020), Canadian politician
- Peter C. Eagler (1954–2024), American politician
- Peter Early (1773–1817), American politician
- Peter Ebbe (1865–1947), American politician
- Péter Eckstein-Kovács (born 1956), Romanian lawyer and politician
- Peter Edgcumbe (1536–1608), English politician
- Peter T. Edge, American government oficial
- Peter Edgecomb, American politician
- Peter Eismann (born 1957), German politician
- Peter Percival Elder (1823–1914), American politician
- Peter Elieson (1770–1833), Norwegian military assessor and politician
- Peter Elson (politician) (1839–1913), Canadian politician
- Peter Elzinga (1944–2023), Canadian politician
- Peter Emery (1926–2004), British politician
- Peter Enzenauer (1878–1951), Canadian politician
- Peter Ester (1953–2022), Dutch sociologist and politician
- Peter Estlin (born 1961), 691st Lord Mayor of London
- Peter Etzenbach (1889–1976), German politician
- Peter Eure, English politician
- Peter Facklam (1930–2023), Swiss politician
- Peter Fagg (1837–1917), American politician
- Peter Chin Fah Kui (born 1945), Malaysian politician
- Peter Fairbairn, British politician
- Peter Falck (c. 1468–1519), Swiss politician, diplomat and scholar
- Peter Fassbender (born 1946), Canadian politician
- Peter Faucett (1813–1894), Australian politician, barrister and judge
- Peter Feilberg (1800–1863), Norwegian politician and news editor
- Peter Felser (born 1969), German politician
- Peter Felt (1784–1866), New Hampshire politician and Illinois pioneer
- Peter Ferbrache (born 1951), Guernsey politician
- Peter Ffrench (1844–1929), Irish politician
- Peter Filbert (1793–1864), American politician
- Peter Finn (1827/1828–1911), Australian politician
- Peter Fitzek (born 1965), German political activist
- Peter Fitzgerald-Moore (1919–2004), British Canadian geologist and environmentalist
- Peter Fitzpatrick (born 1962), Irish politician and sportsman
- Peter F. Flaherty (1924–2005), American mayor
- Peter Flannery (politician), Australian politician
- Peter Florin (1921–2014), East German politician and diplomat
- Peter Fonseca (born 1966), Canadian politician
- Peter Force (1790–1868), American politician and historian
- Peter Forman (born 1958), American politician
- Peter Forney (1756–1834), American politician
- Peter Fortune (born 1978), British politician
- Peter Foss (born 1946), Australian politician
- Peter Fragiskatos (born 1981), Canadian politician
- Peter Franchot (born 1947), American politician
- Peter Frankenberg (born 1947), German politician
- Peter Fretchville, English politician
- Peter Frick (born 1965), Lichtenstein politician
- Peter Christian Frølich (born 1987), Norwegian lawyer and politician
- Peter Frusetta (1932–2020), American politician
- Peter Fry (1931–2015), British politician
- Peter X. Fugina (1908–1994), American politician
- Péter Fülöp (1914–2004), Hungarian diplomat
- Peter Gadsden (1929–2006), 652nd Lord Mayor of London
- Peter Charles Gaillard (1812–1889), American politician
- Peter Gajdoš (born 1959), Slovak general and politician
- Peter Gansevoort (politician) (1788–1876), American politician
- Peter P. Garibaldi (1931–2023), American politician
- Peter Garrisson (1923–2013), Australian politician
- Peter Gatkuoth (1938–2010), South Sudanese politician
- Peter Gautrey (1918–2014), British diplomat
- Peter Gauweiler (born 1949), German politician
- Peter Zack Geer (1928–1997), American politician
- Peter Gelderloos (born 1982), American anarchist
- Peter J. Genova (1944–2026), American politician
- Peter Georgiou (born 1974), Australian politician
- Peter G. Gerry (1879–1957), American politician
- Peter D. Gifford (1812–1888), American politician
- Peter Gingold (1916–2006), German politician
- Peter Njuguna Gitau, Kenyan politician
- Peter Skovholt Gitmark (born 1977), Norwegian politician
- Peter Glotz (1939–2005), German politician
- Peter Goldring (born 1944), Canadian politician
- Peter Gooderham (born 1954), British diplomat
- Peter Gott (1653–1712), English politician
- Peter Götz (born 1947), German politician
- Peter Goudinoff (born 1941), American politician
- Peter Grabill (1820–1890), American politician
- Peter C. Granata (1898–1973), American politician
- Peter W. Grayson, American politician
- Peter Greene (1895–1963), Irish politician
- Peter Greenhill, Manx politician
- Peter Gresham (1933–2024), New Zealand politician
- Peter Griggs (1849–1920), British politician
- Peter Groff (born 1963), American politician
- Peter Gutwein (born 1964), Australian politician
- Peter Haden-Guest, 4th Baron Haden-Guest (1913–1996), British diplomat
- Peter Hager II (1784–1854), American politician
- Peter Hain (born 1950), British politician
- Peter Hamby (born 1981), American political journalist
- Peter J. Hamill (1885–1930), American politician
- Peter A. Hammen (born 1966), American politician
- Peter Hanke (born 1964), Austrian politician
- Peter E. Hanson (1845–1914), American politician
- Peter Harckham (born 1960), American politician
- Peter L. Hargett (1852–1927), American politician
- Péter Harrach (born 1947), Hungarian politician and theologian
- Peter Harwood (born 1947), Guernsey lawyer and politician
- Peter Heaton-Jones (born 1963), British politician and journalist
- Peter Hedberg (born 1990), Swedish politician
- Peter Heenan (1875–1948), Canadian politician
- Peter Hegglin (born 1960), Swiss politician
- Peter Heidt (born 1965), German lawyer and politician
- Peter A. Hemmy (1875–1965), American politician
- Peter Hendrickse (born 1958), South African politician
- Peter Hendy (born 1953), British transport executive and politician
- Peter Hendy (Australian politician) (born 1962)
- Peter Herdic (1824–1888), American politician
- Peter Hermes (1922–2015), German diplomat
- Peter Herzberg, American politician
- Peter Hesketh-Fleetwood (1801–1866), English politician
- Peter Hewlett (born 1941), Zimbabwean farmer and politician
- Peter Heydon (1913–1971), Australian public servant and diplomat
- Peter Heyman, English politician
- Peter Hilt (1942–2025), New Zealand politician
- Peter F. Hines (1927–1984), American politician
- Peter Hintze (1950–2016), German politician
- Peter Hitchcock (1781–1853), American politician
- Peter Hoagland (1941–2007), American politician
- Peter Hodgman (born 1946), Australian politician
- Peter Karl Holmesland (1866–c. 1933), Norwegian politician
- Peter W. Hopkins (1826–1879), American politician
- Péter Hoppál, Hungarian politician
- Peter Horry (1747–1815), American politician
- Peter Howson (politician) (1919–2009), Australian politician
- Peter Hubbard-Miles (1927–2005), British politician
- Peter Hulme-Cross, British politician
- Peter Hultqvist (born 1958), Swedish politician
- Peter Hummelgaard (born 1983), Danish politician
- Peter Humphreys, Papua New Guinean politician
- Peter Lawrence Hyde (1884–1962), Canadian politician
- Peter Hyndman (1941–2006), Canadian politician and lawyer
- Peter Ihrie Jr. (1796–1871), American politician
- Peter Inverso (born 1938), American politician
- Peter Ipatas (born 1958), Papua New Guinean politician
- Peter Irons (born 1940), American political activist
- Peter Irving (1771–1838), American politician
- Peter Isoaimo (born 1969), Papua New Guinean politician
- Peter Isola (1929–2006), Gibraltarian politician
- Peter Ittinuar (born 1950), Canadian politician
- Peter Iwei (born 1965), Papua New Guinean politician
- Peter Jaconelli (1925–1999), British mayor and businessman
- Peter Jahr (born 1959), German politician
- Peter Jankowitsch (born 1933), Austrian diplomat and politician
- Peter Jebsen (1824–1892), Norwegian politician
- Peter Jefferson (1708–1757), American planter, cartographer, and politician
- Peter Jeppsson (born 1968), Swedish politician
- Peter Jilemnický (1901–1949), Slovak writer and politician
- Peter Ndalikali Jiya, Nigerian politician
- Peter Johnsson (born 1962), Swedish politician
- Peter Josie (born 1941), Saint Lucian politician and trade unionist
- Peter Juel-Jensen (born 1966), Danish politician
- Peter Julian (born 1962), Canadian politician
- Peter Kaestner (born 1953), American diplomat
- Peter Kapala, Zambian politician
- Peter Karran (born 1960), Manx politician
- Peter Katjavivi (born 1941), Namibian politician
- Peter Katsambanis (1965–2026), Australian politician
- Peter Kattuk (1950–2019), Canadian politician
- Peter Kažimír (born 1968), Slovak economist and politician
- Peter Keetse, South African politician
- Peter Kemble (1704–1789), American politician
- Peter Kenilorea (1943–2016), Prime Minister of Solomon Islands
- Peter Kenilorea Jr. (born 1973), Solomon Islands politician
- Peter Kenneth (born 1965), Kenyan politician
- Peter Kent (born 1943), Canadian politician
- Peter Kerr-Smiley (1879–1943), Northern Irish Member of Parliament
- Peter Khalil (born 1973), Australian politician
- Peter Khoarai (born 1966), South African politician
- Peter Khoy Saukam (1915–2008), Cambodian politician
- Peter Kiilu (died 2020), Kenyan politician
- Peter Kilabuk (born 1960), Canadian politician
- Peter Kilfoyle (born 1946), British politician
- Peter Kilmartin (born 1962), American politician
- Peter Kinder (born 1954), American lawyer and politician
- Peter Kiołbassa (c. 1837–1905), Polonia activist and Democratic politician in the city of Chicago
- Peter Kmec (born 1966), Slovak diplomat and politician
- Peter Knaak (born 1942), Canadian politician
- Peter Knott (1956–2015), Australian politician
- Peter C. Knudson (1937–2024), American politician
- Peter Kocot (1956–2018), American politician
- Peter Kofod (born 1990), Danish politician
- Peter Koo (born 1952), American politician
- Peter Kormos (1952–2013), Canadian politician
- Peter Kostelka (1946–2025), Austrian politician
- Peter H. Kostmayer (born 1946), American politician
- Peter Kott (born 1949), American politician
- Peter Koutoujian (born 1961), American politician
- Peter Rasmus Krag (1825–1891), Norwegian politician
- Peter Kresánek (born 1951), Slovak politician
- Peter Kritaqliluk (c. 1951–2011), Canadian politician
- Peter Kullgren (born 1981), Swedish politician
- Peter Kumpalume, Malawian politician
- Peter Kurth (born 1960), German politician
- Peter Kurz (born 1962), German politician and former Lord Mayor of Mannheim
- Peter Kwaw, Ghanaian politician
- Peter Kwint (born 1984), Dutch politician
- Peter Kyros (1925–2012), American politician
- Peter la Chapman, 14th-century English politician
- Peter Lacy (1310–1375), English keeper of the Privy Seal
- Peter Lalor (1827–1889), Australian politician
- Peter Lampert (1951–2015), Liechtenstein politician
- Peter Langenfeld, American politician
- Peter Lankhorst (born 1947), Dutch politician
- Peter Laurie (1778–1861), British politician
- Peter Lavies, American politician
- Peter Law (1948–2006), Welsh politician
- Peter LeBlanc (born 1938), Canadian politician and accountant
- Peter A. Leininger (1860–1937), American politician
- Peter Leishman, American politician
- Peter Leja Igbodor (born 1962), Nigerian politician
- Peter Leon (born 1942), Canadian politician
- Peter F. Leuch (1883–1959), American politician
- Peter Liba (1940–2007), Canadian politician
- Peter Liese (born 1965), German physician and politician
- Peter Lilley (born 1943), British politician
- Peter Lindsay (born 1944), Australian politician
- Peter Little (1775–1830), American politician
- Peter Lo Su Yin (1923–2020), Malaysian politician
- Peter Lochen (1840–1924), American politician
- Peter Lockwood (born 1950), Australian politician
- Peter Lokeris (born 1947), Ugandan politician
- Peter Loney (born 1948), Australian politician
- Peter Bartholomew Long (1805–1890), English politician
- Peter Lorenz (1922–1987), German politician
- Peter Loughlin (1881–1960), Australian politician
- Peter Lougheed (1928–2012), Canadian politician
- Peter E. Love (1818–1866), American politician
- Peter Lovett, American politician
- Peter Luff (born 1955), British politician
- Peter Luginbill (1818–1886), American politician
- Peter Lundgren (born 1963), Swedish politician
- Peter Luykx (born 1964), Belgian politician
- Peter Lyford, American politician
- Peter Mac Manu, Ghanaian politician
- Peter MacIsaac (1878–1969), Canadian politician
- Peter MacLeod (1930–2001), Canadian politician
- Peter MacNutt (1834–1919), Canadian politician
- Peter Madubueze, Nigerian politician
- Péter Magyar (born 1981), Hungarian politician
- Peter P. Mahoney (1848–1889), American politician
- Peter Makaroff (1894–1970), Canadian politician
- Peter Maley (born 1969), Australian politician, barrister, and magistrate
- Peter Malinauskas (born 1980), Australian politician and trade unionist
- Peter Maluleka (born 1954), South African politician
- Peter Mancini (born 1956), Canadian politician
- Peter Mandelson (born 1953), British politician
- Peter Manley (1904–1998), Canadian politician
- Peter Manwood, English politician
- Peter Marais (born 1948), South African politician
- Peter G. Marbaniang (1939–1997), Indian politician
- Péter Márki-Zay (born 1972), Hungarian politician
- Peter Marxer (1933–2016), Liechtensteiner politician
- Peter Masniuk (1920–1995), Canadian politician
- Peter Mathuki (born 1969), Kenyan diplomat
- Peter W. Matts (1814–1903), American politician
- Peter Maughan (1811–1871), American politician
- Peter Maurer (born 1956), Swiss diplomat
- Peter Maxey (1930–2014), British diplomat
- Peter Mayen, South Sudanese politician
- Peter Duncan McCallum (1853–1917), Canadian politician
- Peter McCardle (born 1955), New Zealand politician
- Peter M. McCoy Jr. (born 1978), American lawyer and politician
- Peter McCrackan (1844–1928), Australian politician
- Peter McCreath (born 1943), Canadian politician
- Peter McDonough (1925–1998), American politician
- Peter McDowell (1938–2024), American politician
- Peter P. McElligott (1878–1931), American lawyer and politician
- Peter McGalloway (1852–1931), American politician
- Peter J. McGarry (1871–1940), American politician
- Peter McGauran (born 1955), Australian politician
- Peter Robert McGibbon (1854–1921), Canadian politician
- Peter McGibbon (1873–1936), Canadian politician
- Peter McGovern, American politician
- Peter McGowan (1936–2020), American politician
- Peter Adolphus McIntyre (1840–1910), Canadian politician
- Peter McKechnie (1941–2011), Australian politician
- Peter McKinley, American politician
- Peter McLachlan (Queensland politician) (1867–1929), Australian politician
- Peter McLachlan (Northern Ireland politician) (1936–1999), British politician
- Peter McLagan (1823–1900), British Liberal politician
- Peter McLaren (1833–1919), Canadian politician
- Peter McLaughlin (born 1949), American politician and educator
- Peter McLellan (1942–1999), Australian politician
- Peter McMahon (1931–2022), Australian politician
- Peter McMullin (born 1952), Victoria, Australian mayor
- Peter McReynolds, Northern Irish politician
- Peter McSkimming (1872–1941), New Zealand politician
- Peter McSweeney (1842–1921), Canadian politician
- Péter Medgyessy (born 1942), Hungarian politician
- Peter Mehegan, American politician
- Peter Meijer (born 1988), American politician
- Peter Meiszner (born 1983), Canadian politician
- Peter Meiwald (born 1966), German politician
- Peter Menacher (born 1939), German politician
- Peter Mertens (born 1969), Belgian politician
- Peter Mesheau, Canadian politician
- Peter Micciche (born 1961), American politician
- Péter Mihalovics (born 1983), Hungarian politician
- Peter Milczyn (born 1965), Canadian politician
- Peter Milobar (born 1970), Canadian politician
- Peter G. Mirto (1915–2001), American politician
- Peter Miskew (1899–1965), Canadian politician and lawyer
- Peter Mitterer (1946–2013), Austrian politician
- Peter Sigurd Mjør (1926–1975), Norwegian politician
- Peter Moatshe (born 1940), South African politician
- Peter Kjeldseth Moe (1909–1973), Norwegian politician
- Peter Joinud Mojuntin (1939–1976), Malaysian politician
- Peter Mokaba (1959–2002), South African politician
- Peter Torleivson Molaug (1902–1985), Norwegian politician
- Peter Moraites (1922–2014), American politician
- Peter Andreas Morell (1868–1948), Norwegian politician
- Peter Moreth (1941–2014), German politician
- Peter Motzfeldt (1777–1854), Norwegian politician
- Peter Msigwa (born 1965), Tanzanian politician
- Peter Msolla (born 1945), Tanzanian politician
- Peter Muhlenberg (1746–1807), American politician
- Peter Münstermann (born 1956), German politician
- Peter Munya, Kenyan politician
- Peter Murnoy, Northern Irish politician
- Peter Mutharika (born 1940), President of Malawi
- Peter Mwanza (born 1937), Malawian politician
- Peter Mweshihange (1930–1998), Namibian politician
- Peter N. Myhre (born 1954), Norwegian politician
- Peter Nagle (born 1946), Australian politician
- Peter Naholo, Namibian politician
- Peter Naigow (c. 1946–2011), Liberian politician
- Peter Mercallo Nasir, South Sudanese politician
- Peter Nattrass (born 1941), Australian mayor
- Peter M. Neal (1811–1908), American politician
- Peter Nehr (born 1952), American politician
- Peter Nellen (1912–1969), German politician
- Peter Nelton (1853–1936), American politician
- Peter Nemeth, American politician
- Peter Newhard (1783–1860), American politician
- Péter Niedermüller (born 1952), Hungarian politician
- Peter Nixon (1928–2025), Australian politician
- Peter Njeru Ndwiga, Kenyan politician
- Peter James Nkambo Mugerwa (1933–2020), Ugandan lawyer and politician
- Peter Norbeck (1870–1936), American politician
- Peter Nortsu-Kotoe (born 1956), Ghanaian politician
- Peter Nugent (1938–2001), Australian politician
- Peter Nwaoboshi (1958–2025), Nigerian politician
- Peter Nyombi (1954–2018), Ugandan politician
- Peter Nyoni (born 1966), South African politician
- Peter Nystrom, American politician
- Peter Davis Oakey (1861–1920), American politician
- Peter Oberacker (born 1963), American businessman and politician
- Peter Obi (born 1961), Nigerian politician
- Peter Ochs (1752–1821), Swiss politician
- Peter Odili (born 1948), Nigerian politician
- Peter Ochieng Odoyo (born 1959), Kenyan politician
- Peter Ogwang (born 1983), Ugandan politician
- Peter O'Hagan (died 2009), Northern Irish politician
- Peter O'Keefe (born 1937), American politician
- Peter Kwadwo Okpora, Ghanaian politician
- Péter Olajos (born 1968), Hungarian politician
- P.R. Olgiati (1901–1989), 55th Mayor of Chattanooga, Tennessee
- Peter B. Olney (1843–1922), American lawyer and politician
- Peter Oloo-Aringo (1941–2024), Kenyan politician
- Peter B. Olsen (1848–1926), American politician
- Peter O'Neill (born 1965), Papua New Guinean politician
- Peter Oppenheim (born 1973), American lawyer and political advisor
- Peter Godsday Orubebe (born 1959), Nigerian politician
- Peter Östman (born 1961), Finnish politician
- Peter Osuský (born 1953), Slovak politician
- Péter Oszkó (born 1973), Hungarian politician
- Peter J. Otey (1840–1902), American politician
- Peter Boamah Otokunor, Ghanaian politician
- Peter Owolabi, Nigerian politician
- Peter Kenneth Owusu, Ghanaian politician
- Peter Paterna (1937–2018), German politician
- Peter Partington (born 1939), Canadian politician
- Peter Patmore (born 1952), Australian politician
- Peter Pčolinský (born 1982), Slovak politician
- Peter Peacock (born 1952), British politician
- Peter Pellegrini (born 1975), Slovak politician
- Peter Penashue (born 1964), Canadian politician
- Peter Penfold (1944–2023), British diplomat
- Peter Wiafe Pepera (1954–2016), Ghanaian politician
- Peter E. Perley (1944–2023), American politician
- Peter Persson (born 1955), Swedish politician
- Peter Pettalia (1955–2016), American politician
- Peter Petrigno (born 1954), American politician
- Peter Pilz (born 1952), Austrian politician
- Peter J. Pitchess (1912–1999), American politician
- Peter Plowman (1902–1983), Samoan politician
- Peter Polin (1832–1870), American politician
- Peter Pollák (born 1973), Slovak politician
- Peter Polleruhs (1949–2022), Austrian engineer and politician
- Peter Popovich (1920–1996), American judge and politician
- Peter Porsch (born 1944), German politician
- Peter Poulos, Australian politician
- Peter Power, Irish politician
- Peter Poythress (1733–1787), politician of The Colony of Virginia
- Peter Prebble (born 1950), Canadian politician
- Peter Prenzler (born 1952), Australian politician
- Peter Preston (1935–2016), Canadian politician
- Sir Peter Prideaux, 3rd Baronet (1626–1706), English politician
- Peter Primrose (born 1955), Australian politician
- Peter Prinsley (born 1958), British politician
- Peter Probie, English politician
- Peter Pyke (born 1950), Australian politician
- Peter Pyszczynski (1892–1946), American politician
- Peter Rådberg (born 1956), Swedish politician
- Peter Nicolay Ræder (born 1943), Norwegian diplomat
- Peter Radunski (1939–2026), German politician
- Peter Rae (born 1932), Australian politician
- Peter Raffan (1863–1940), British politician
- Peter Gottfred Ramm (1834–1917), Danish military officer and politician
- Peter Ramsauer (born 1954), German politician
- Peter Randles (1923–2008), Australian politician
- Peter Reidy (c. 1874–1932), Australian politician
- Peter Reinberg (1858–1921), American politician
- Peter Reinhold (1887–1955), German politician
- Peter Reith (1950–2022), Australian politician
- Peter Remnant (1897–1968), British politician
- Peter Reuther (1836–1905), American politician
- Peter Ricketts (born 1952), British senior diplomat
- Peter Riddel, English politician
- Peter Riggs (born 1979), American politician and businessman
- Peter M. Rivera (born 1946), American politician
- Peter W. Rodino (1909–2005), American politician
- Peter Rodman (1943–2008), American government official
- Peter Rodosovich (born 1959), American politician
- Peter Röhlinger (born 1939), German politician
- Peter Rolston (1937–2006), Canadian politician
- Peter Roskam (born 1961), American politician
- Peter Rundle (born 1962), Australian politician
- Peter Johannes Rutten (1864–1953), Dutch politician
- Peter H. Ruvolo (1895–1943), American politician
- Peter Rylands (1820–1887), British politician
- Peter Safari Shehe (born 1955), Kenyan politician
- Peter Sailly (1754–1826), American politician
- Peter Samt (born 1957), Austrian politician
- Peter Sandhu, Canadian politician
- Peter Sarkodie (born 1961), Ghanaian politician
- Peter F. Schabarum (1929–2021), American football player and politician
- Peter Schalk (born 1961), Dutch politician
- Péter Schell (1898–1944), Hungarian politician
- Peter Schieder (1941–2013), Austrian politician
- Peter Schiefke (born 1979), Canadian politician
- Peter Schivarelli (born 1945), American politician
- Peter Schmidhuber (1931–2020), German politician
- Peter Schmiedlechner (born 1982), Austrian politician
- Peter J. Schmitt (1950–2012), American politician
- Peter Schmitz (born 1954), German United Nations official
- Peter Schowtka (1945–2022), German politician
- Peter Schulz (1930–2013), German politician
- Peter Schulze (1935–2019), Australian politician
- Peter Schwartzkopf (born 1955), American politician
- Peter Schweyer (born 1978), American politician
- Peter Secchia (1937–2020), American businessman and diplomat
- Peter Seimer (born 1993), German politician
- Peter Sekulic (born 1962), Canadian politician
- Peter Semneby (born 1959), Swedish diplomat
- Peter Shack (born 1953), Australian politician
- Peter Shafirov (c. 1670–1739), Russian statesman
- Peter Shannel Agovaka (born 1959), Solomon Islands politician
- Peter Shannon, Australian diplomat
- Peter Shaver (1776–1866), Canadian politician
- Peter Shiu (born 1970), Hong Kong politician
- Peter Shore (1924–2001), British politician
- Peter Shumlin (born 1956), American politician
- Peter Shurman (born 1947), Canadian politician
- Peter Sidgreaves, Australian politician
- Peter F. Silbernagel (born 1950), American politician
- Peter Sim (1917–2015), Australian politician
- Peter Singh, Canadian politician
- Peter Singleton Wilkes (1827–1900), American politician
- Peter Skaarup (born 1964), Danish politician
- Peter Skinner (born 1959), British Labour politician
- Peter Slipper (born 1950), Australian politician
- Peter Smithers (1913–2006), British politician
- Peter Smitskam (born 1958), Dutch politician
- Peter Smyth (c. 1800–1879), Canadian politician
- Peter Snape (born 1942), British politician
- Peter Snodgrass (1817–1867), Australian politician
- Peter Snowe (1943–1973), American politician
- Peter Söderström (born 1975), Swedish politician
- Peter Collett Solberg (1866–1934), Norwegian businessperson and politician
- Peter J. Somers (1850–1924), Irish-American politician
- Peter Soulsby (born 1948), British Labour politician and Mayor of Leicester
- Peter Spanos, American politician
- Peter Spearwater, Canadian politician
- Peter Sprenger (1953–2018), Liechtenstein politician
- Peter Spyker (born 1942), Australian politician
- Peter J. Stadelman (1871–1954), American politician
- Peter Staley (born 1961), American political activist
- Peter Stangier (1898–1962), German Nazi Party politician
- Peter Staples (born 1947), Australian politician
- Peter Burwell Starke (1813–1888), American politician
- Peter Stautberg (born 1964), American politician
- Peter Steedman (1943–2024), Australian politician
- Peter Steenhusen (1903–1975), American politician
- Peter Stefura (1923–1982), Canadian politician
- Peter Steinbrueck (born 1957), American politician
- Peter Stenlund (born 1951), Finnish diplomat
- Peter Stoffer (born 1956), Canadian politician
- Peter Stollery (born 1935), Canadian politician and businessman
- Peter Johan Støren (1859–1925), Norwegian operating manager and politician
- Peter W. Strader (1818–1881), American politician
- Peter Strand, American politician
- Peter Streams (born 1935), British diplomat
- Peter Stubblefield (1888–1966), American politician
- Peter Malden Studd (1916–2003), Lord Mayor of London
- Peter A. Sturgeon (1916–2005), American political activist
- Peter Sturt, English politician
- Peter Sugiyama (1943–2007), Palauan politician
- Peter Sung, Singaporean politician
- Peter Swallow, British politician
- Peter Swart (1752–1829), American politician
- Peter B. Sweeny (1825–1911), American politician
- Peter Symon (1922–2008), Australian politician
- Péter Szalay (born 1940), Hungarian politician
- Péter Szijjártó (born 1978), Hungarian politician
- Peter Taaffe (1942–2025), British Marxist Trotskyist
- Peter Tabuns (born 1951), Canadian politician
- Peter Rawson Taft (1785–1867), American politician
- Peter Tagliaferri, Australian politician
- Peter Francis Tague (1871–1941), American politician
- Peter Taksøe-Jensen (born 1959), Danish diplomat
- Peter Taptuna (born 1956), Canadian politician
- Peter Tarnoff (1937–2023), American politician
- Peter Tatár (born 1953), Slovak politician
- Peter Tauber (born 1974), German politician
- Peter B. Teeley (1940–2024), American diplomat
- Peter B. Teets (1942–2020), American government official
- Peter Teixeira, South African politician
- Peter Temple-Morris (1938–2018), British politician
- Peter G. Ten Eyck (1873–1944), American politician
- Peter Tercyak (born 1954), American politician
- Peter Terpeluk Jr. (1948–2011), American politician
- Peter Tesei (born 1969), American politician
- Peter G. Tessier, Canadian politician
- Peter Thalheimer (1936–2018), Canadian politician and lawyer
- Peter Thellusson, 1st Baron Rendlesham (1761–1808), British politician
- Peter Thorneycroft (1909–1994), British politician
- Peter Thurnham (1938–2008), British politician
- Peter Tibber (born 1956), British diplomat
- Peter Timothy, American politician
- Peter Tinley (born 1962), Australian politician
- Peter Tobaben (1905–1972), German politician
- Peter Tolpat, 16th-century English politician
- Peter Tomasello Jr. (1900–1960), American politician
- Peter Tomsen (born 1940), American diplomat
- Peter Christoffersen Tønder (1641–1694), Norwegian government official
- Peter G. Torkildsen, American politician
- Peter Torosian, American politician
- Peter Torry (born 1948), British diplomat
- Peter Towe (1922–2015), Canadian diplomat
- Peter Toyne (born 1946), Australian politician
- Peter Treloar, Australian politician
- Peter Edward Trench (1918–2006), British developer and politician
- Peter Trent (born 1946), English-born Canadian politician
- Peter Tripp (1921–2010), British diplomat
- Peter Trites (1946–2010), Canadian politician
- Peter J. Tropman (born 1944), American politician
- Peter Troubetzkoy (1822–1892), Russian diplomat
- Peter Daniel Truman (1935–2018), American politician
- Peter Truscott, Baron Truscott, British Labour Party politician and peer
- Peter Trynchy (1931–2022), Canadian politician
- Peter Tschentscher (born 1966), German politician
- Peter Tsheehama (1941–2010), Namibian military commander, diplomat, and politician
- Peter F. Tufo (born 1938), American diplomat
- Peter Tultaev (born 1961), Russian politician
- Peter Turck, American politician
- Peter Tyerman (1859–1933), Canadian politician
- Peter Ujvagi (born 1949), American politician
- Peter Linus Umoh (born 1957), Nigerian politician
- Peter Unabia (born 1962), Filipino businessman and politician
- Peter Urscheler (born 1983), American politician
- Peter Valeur (1847–1922), Norwegian politician
- Peter Vallone Sr. (born 1934), American politician
- Peter Valstar (born 1985), Dutch politician
- Péter Vályi (1919–1973), Hungarian politician
- Peter Van Alstine, Canadian politician
- Peter A. Van Bergen (1763–1804), American politician
- Peter van Buren (born 1960), American diplomat
- Peter van Dalen (born 1958), Dutch politician
- Peter van der Voort (born 1964), Dutch physician, professor, and politician
- Peter van Dijk (born 1952), Dutch politician
- Peter Van Every (1795–1859), American politician
- Peter Van Gaasbeck (1754–1797), American politician
- Peter van Haasen (born 1960), Dutch politician
- Peter van Heemst (born 1952), Dutch politician
- Peter Van Homrigh (1768–1831), Irish politician
- Peter Van Loan (born 1963), Canadian politician
- Peter Van Rompuy (born 1980), Belgian politician
- Peter Van Santen (1913–2011), American politician
- Peter Van Vliet (died 1876), American farmer and politician
- Peter van Walsum (1934–2019), Dutch diplomat
- Peter van Wijmen (1938–2015), Dutch politician
- Peter G. Van Winkle (1808–1872), American politician
- Peter Vandy, Sierra Leonean politician
- Peter Vanvelthoven (born 1962), Belgian politician
- Peter Varghese (born 1956), Australian diplomat and public servant
- Péter Várkonyi (1931–2008), Hungarian politician
- Peter Varney, American politician
- Peter A. Velis (born 1942), American politician
- Peter A. Vellucci (1942–2014), American politician
- Peter Venables (1604–c. 1669), English politician
- Peter Veniot (1863–1936), Canadian politician
- Péter Vida (born 1983), German politician
- Peter Viggers (1938–2020), British politician
- Peter Vilho (born 1962), Namibian politician
- Peter Villano (1924–2024), American politician
- Peter von Meyendorff (1796–1863), Russian diplomat
- Peter H. Vrooman (born 1966), American diplomat
- Peter Vroon (1917–1997), American politician
- Peter Wallis (born 1935), British diplomat
- Peter Wambach (born 1946), American politician
- Peter F. Wanser (1849–1918), American politician
- Peter T. Washburn (1814–1870), American lawyer, politician, and soldier
- Peter Grayson Washington (1798–1872), American government official
- Peter Watkins (born 1929), Australian politician
- Peter T. Way (1937–2018), American clergyman and politician
- Peter Weinstein (born 1947), American politician
- Peter Weiß (born 1956), German politician
- Peter Welch (born 1947), American lawyer and politician
- Peter Wellington (born 1957), Australian politician
- Peter H. Wendover (1768–1834), American politician
- Peter Wentworth, 16th-century English politician
- Peter Wescombe (1932–2014), British diplomat
- Peter Westerway (1931–2015), Australian public servant and Labor Party official
- Peter Westmacott (born 1950), British diplomat
- Peter J. Whalen, American politician
- Peter Whish-Wilson (born 1968), Australian politician
- Peter Whiteside (1870–1929), South African trade union leader and politician
- Peter Wichtel (born 1949), German politician
- Peter D. Wigginton (1839–1890), American politician
- Peter Wilenski (1939–1994), Australian public servant and ambassador
- Peter Willsman, British political activist
- Peter Winser (died 1865), Canadian politician
- Peter Wirth (born 1961), American politician
- Peter Wittig (born 1954), German diplomat
- Peter Woo (born 1946), Hong Kong politician and businessman
- Peter Woodward (died 1685), American politician
- Peter Woolcott (born 1953), Australian public servant and diplomat
- Peter Wurm (born 1965), Austrian politician
- Peter Yama (born 1955), Papua New Guinean politician
- Peter Yaw Kwakye-Ackah (born 1957), Ghanaian politician
- Peter Yeomans, Canadian politician
- Peter Youens (1916–2000), British diplomat
- Peter Yuen, Canadian politician and retired police officer
- Peter Žiga (born 1972), Slovak politician
- Peter C. Zimmerman (1887–1950), American politician
- Peter Zug (born 1958), American politician
- Peter Gustav Zwilgmeyer (1813–1887), Norwegian politician

== Religion ==
- Saint Peter (died 64–68), Jesus' disciple
- Peter I of Alexandria (d. 311), Pope and Patriarch of Alexandria
- Peter the Deacon (died 605), confidant of Pope Gregory I and rector of Sicily
- Peter of Canterbury (died c. 610), the first abbot of the monastery of SS. Peter and Paul in Canterbury
- Peter of Pavia (bishop) (died 735), a saint and Bishop of Pavia
- Peter of Anagni (died 1105), a saint and Bishop Of Anagni
- Peter, the bishop of Zaragoza (Spain) in 1112
- Peter the Deacon (died c. 1140), "the Librarian" (Bibliothecarius)
- Peter II of Tarentaise (1102–1174), Archbishop of Tarentaise and saint
- Peter Pareuzi (died 1199), a Papal legate, martyr and saint
- Peter, a companion in martyrdom of Berard of Carbio (died 1220)
- Saint Peter of Verona (1206–1252), also known as Peter Martyr
- Peter of Auvergne (died after 1310), a scholastic philosopher
- Saint Peter of Moscow (died 1326), Metropolitan of Moscow and all Russia
- Saint Peter of Murom (1167–1228), Prince of Murom and Wonderworker
- Peter of Aquila (died 1361), an Italian Franciscan theologian and bishop
- Peter of Bergamo (died 1482), a Dominican theologian
- Peter Martyr Vermigli (1499–1562), a Reformation-era theologian
- Saint Peter the Aleut (died 1815?), an Eastern Orthodox Christian martyr in California
- Manuel Corral, leader of the Palmarian Christian Church from 2005 to 2011 under the title Pope Peter II
- Peter (Loukianoff) (1948–2024), archbishop of the Russian Orthodox Church Outside of Russia
- Peter (Musteață) (born 1967), Russian Orthodox bishop of Ungheni and Nisporeni, Moldova
- Peter Ackroyd (1917–2005), British scholar and priest
- Peter Iornzuul Adoboh (1958–2020), Nigerian Catholic priest
- Peter Ahn (1917–2003), American missionary
- Peter Akerovich, 13th-century Metropolitan of Kiev
- Peter Akinola (born 1944), primate of the Church of Nigeria
- Peter Aliphas, 11th-century Norman knight in the service of the Byzantine Empire
- Peter Allix (1679–1758), Anglican priest
- Peter Ambarach, Maronite priest
- Peter Ambuofa, early convert to Christianity
- Peter Amigo (1864–1949), British Roman Catholic bishop
- Peter Andreychuk (1892–1937), Ukrainian Catholic martyr
- Peter Abir Antonisamy (born 1952), Indian prelate
- Peter Apselamus, 3rd-century Christian martyr
- Peter Arkoudios, 17th-century Greek scholar and Catholic priest
- Peter Arok, South Sudan bishop
- Peter Artemiev, Russian Orthodox Deacon
- Peter Atwood, English Dominican friar
- Peter August, Duke of Schleswig-Holstein-Sonderburg-Beck (1697–1775)
- Peter Awelewa Adebiyi (1943–2022), Anglican bishop of Nigeria
- Peter Daniel Baade (1737–1823), Norwegian priest and jurist
- Peter Hubert Evermode Backx (1805–1868), Belgian abbot
- Peter Baelz, Anglican priest and theologian
- Peter Baldacchino (born 1960), Maltese-born American prelate
- Peter Ballard (born 1955), British Archdeacon
- Peter Joseph Baltes (1827–1886), Catholic bishop
- Peter Bard, English knight and naval officer
- Peter William Bartholome (1893–1982), American prelate
- Peter Beckwith (1939–2019), American Anglican bishop
- Peter Jan Beckx (1795–1887), Belgian Jesuit priest
- Peter Bender (1893–1944), German writer and religious leader
- Peter Beyerhaus (1929–2020), German Protestant pastor, theologian, missionary scholar
- Peter Biddle (born 1966), American technical evangelist
- Peter Bielański (c. 1736–1798), Ukrainian Greek Catholic hierarch
- P. B. G. Binnall (1907–1980), Church of England minister
- Peter Binsfeld, German bishop and theologian
- Peter J. Blenkinsop (1818–1896), Irish-American Jesuit
- Péter Bornemisza (c. 1535–1584), Hungarian bishop and playwright
- Peter Bourgade (1845–1908), French-born American prelate
- Peter Munch Brager (1806–1869), Norwegian priest and politician
- Peter Brain (born 1947), Australian bishop
- Peter Brignall (born 1953), Catholic bishop of Wrexham
- Peter Olivarius Bugge (1764–1849), Norwegian bishop
- Peter Bulkley (1583–1659), English and later American Puritan
- Peter Burrows (born 1955), British retired Anglican bishop
- Peter Louis Cakü (1953–2020), Burmese bishop
- Peter Canisius (1521–1597), Dutch Jesuit Catholic priest
- Peter Carlson (1822–1909), Swedish missionary
- Peter Carnley (born 1937), Australian Anglican bishop
- Peter Carrell, bishop of Christchurch
- Peter Cellensis (c. 1115–1183), French Benedictine and bishop
- Peter Chaceporc, Archdeacon of Wells
- Peter Chanel (1803–1841), French Catholic priest, missionary and martyr
- Peter Chao Yung-Chi, Chinese Roman Catholic bishop
- Peter Chen Bolu (1914–2009), Chinese Catholic bishop
- Peter Adrian Chifukwa (born 1973), Malawian Catholic prelate
- Peter Chrysologus (died 450), bishop of Ravenna
- Peter Claver (1580–1654), Spanish Jesuit missionary
- Peter Collingridge (1757–1829), English Roman Catholic bishop
- Peter Comensoli (born 1964), Australian Catholic archbishop
- Peter Comestor, 12th-century French theologian
- Peter Conefrey, Irish priest and cultural nationalist
- Peter Coombs (1928–2020), English Anglican priest
- Peter Craigie (1938–1985), British biblical scholar
- Peter Creagh (1642–1705), Irish Roman Catholic bishop
- Peter Cullinane (born 1936), Catholic bishop
- Peter Dajnko (1787–1873), Slovene priest and author
- Peter Damian, 11th-century Benedictine monk
- Peter H. Davids (born 1947), Canadian priest and religious scholar
- Peter Dawes (1928–2022), Church of England bishop
- Peter de Bermingham, Anglo-Irish landowner
- Peter de Leia (died 1198), Welsh monk and bishop
- Peter de Ros, 12th-century Anglo-Norman monk and royal judge
- Peter Vogelius Deinboll (1783–1874), Danish-Norwegian priest, parliamentary representative and entomologist
- Peter Dens (1690–1775), Belgian theologian
- Peter Denys (1760–1816), British drawing master, patron of the arts and landowner
- Peter Porekuu Dery (1918–2008), Ghanaian Catholic cardinal
- Peter des Roches, 13th-century Bishop of Winchester and Justiciar of England
- Peter Deyneka (1897–1987), Russian-American evangelist
- Peter Ditchfield (1854–1930), British priest, historian and author
- Peter Doi (1892–1970), Japanese Cardinal of the Roman Catholic Church
- Peter Donders (1809–1887), Dutch Roman Catholic missionary
- Peter du Moulin (1601–1684), French-English Anglican clergyman
- Peter Durrett, Baptist preacher
- Peter J. Dyck (1914–2010), Canadian Mennonite relief worker and pastor
- Peter Eagles (born 1959), British Anglican bishop
- Peter Eaton (born 1958), American Episcopal bishop
- Peter Eliot (1910–1995), English Anglican priest
- Peter Celestine Elampassery (1938–2015), Indian priest
- Peter Joseph Elvenich (1796–1886), German Catholic theologian and philosopher
- Peter Enns (born 1961), American Biblical scholar and theologian
- Péter Erdő (born 1952), Hungarian Catholic cardinal
- Peter Julian Eymard (1811–1868), French priest
- Peter Joseph Fan Xueyan (1907–1992), Roman Catholic bishop of Baoding
- Peter Fenty, Canadian bishop
- Peter Firth (1929–2024), English Anglican clergyman
- Peter Fjellstedt (1802–1881), Swedish missionary
- Peter Flint, American scholar
- Peter Flood, Irish priest and President of Maynooth College
- Peter Foulkes (1676–1747), Welsh churchman and academic
- Peter Fourier (1565–1640), French Roman Catholic saint
- Peter Friedhofen (1819–1860), German Roman Catholic priest
- Péter Fülöp Kocsis (born 1963), Hungarian Greek Catholic archbishop
- Peter Galloway (born 1954), British Anglican priest and historian
- Peter Leo Gerety (1912–2016), Catholic archbishop
- Peter E. Gillquist (1938–2012), American writer and priest
- Peter Godard (1705–1781), English priest and academic
- Peter González (1190–1246), Spanish Dominican friar and priest
- Peter Graystone (born 1958), English Christian writer
- Peter Grice, Australian Anglican bishop and former lawyer
- Peter Guilday (1884–1947), American Catholic historian
- Peter Johnson Gulick (1796–1877), American missionary
- Peter Gumpel (1923–2022), German Jesuit priest and historian
- Peter Gunning (1614–1684), British bishop
- Peter Halldorf (born 1958), Swedish pastor
- Peter Harman (born 1973), Catholic priest and Rector of the Pontifical North American College
- Peter Hinchliff (1929–1995), South African priest
- Peter Hognestad (1866–1931), Norwegian Lutheran bishop, theologian, writer and translator
- Peter Hollingworth (1935–2026), Australian Anglican bishop
- Peter Ulrik Magnus Hount (1769–1815), Norwegian priest
- Peter Howell-Jones, British Anglican priest
- Peter Howes (1911–2003), Anglican bishop in Malaysia
- Peter Hullah (born 1949), Anglican bishop of Ramsbury
- Peter Hullermann (born 1947), German Catholic priest
- Peter Joseph Hundt (born 1956), Canadian Roman Catholic prelate
- Peter Joseph Hurth (1857–1935), Roman Catholic priest
- Peter Francis Hylebos (1848–1918), Catholic priest
- Peter Igneus, 11th-century Italian Roman Catholic Benedictine monk
- Peter Imasuen, Anglican bishop in Nigeria
- Peter Leo Ireton (1882–1958), American prelate
- Peter Yariyok Jatau (1931–2020), Nigerian Roman Catholic bishop
- Peter Toshio Jinushi (1930–2021), Japanese Roman Catholic bishop
- Peter Joseph Jugis (born 1957), American prelate of the Roman Catholic Church
- Peter Joseph Kairo (born 1941), Kenyan Catholic prelate
- Peter Kániš (died 1421), Bohemian Hussite priest and theologian
- Peter Philip James Kean (1788–1828), American aristocrat
- Peter Kenney, Irish Jesuit
- Peter Richard Kenrick (1816–1896), Irish Catholic priest
- Peter Kharischirashvili (1804–1890), Georgian Catholic priest
- Peter Kilkelly (died 1783), Irish Roman Catholic priest
- Peter Killikelly, Irish Roman Catholic bishop
- Peter Kimani Ndung'u, Kenyan Roman Catholic prelate
- Peter Kohlgraf (born 1967), German Roman Catholic bishop
- Péter Kollár (1855–1908), Slovenian writer and priest
- Peter Hans Kolvenbach (1928–2016), Superior General of the Society of Jesus
- Peter Douglas Koon, Hong Kong clergyman
- Peter Kőszegi, 13th-century Hungarian bishop
- Peter Kwasniewski (born 1971), American Catholic writer
- Peter Joseph Lavialle (1819–1867), Catholic bishop
- Peter Leithart (born 1959), American theologian
- Peter Henry Lemke (1799–1882), German Roman Catholic missionary in the United States
- Peter Anthony Libasci (born 1951), Catholic bishop
- Peter Lieou, Catholic saint
- Peter Lillback (born 1952), American theologian and academic
- Peter Lily, Church of England clergyman
- Peter Lombard (1096–1160), 12th-century Medieval priest and theologian
- Peter Lomongin, Ugandan Anglican bishop
- Peter Loukianoff (1948–2024), American Russian Orthodox prelate
- Peter Machado (born 1954), Indian Catholic Archbishop of Bangalore
- Peter Munguti Makau (born 1975), Kenyan Catholic prelate
- Peter Mallett (1925–1996), British priest and chaplain-general
- Peter Mallon (1929–2007), Canadian Catholic archbishop
- Peter Manto, American Anglican bishop
- Peter Marzinkowski (1939–2024), German Roman Catholic bishop
- Peter Masiza (1840–1907), first black Anglican priest ordained in South Africa
- Peter Masters, Minister of the Metropolitan Tabernacle in central London
- Peter Maturin, Irish Anglican cleric
- Peter Maurin (1877–1949), French Catholic activist
- Saint Peter Mavimenus (died 743), Damascene Christian martyr
- Peter McKeefry (1899–1973), New Zealand Catholic cardinal
- Peter McManus (1829–1859), recipient of the Victoria Cross
- Peter McVerry (born 1944), English priest and activist
- Peter Medd (1829–1908), British priest
- Peter Hildebrand Meienberg (1929–2021), Swiss Benedictine missionary
- Peter Mews (1619–1706), English Royalist theologian and bishop
- Peter Milward (1925–2017), Jesuit priest and literary scholar
- Peter Monoszló (1240–1307), Hungarian prelate
- Peter Morwen, English clergyman and translator
- Peter Michael Muhich (1961–2024), American prelate of the Catholic Church
- Peter Mudonyi, Ugandan Anglican bishop
- Peter Muldoon (1863–1927), American prelate
- Peter Mullen (born 1942), British Church of England priest
- Peter Musteață (born 1967), Moldovan orthodox bishop
- Peter Mwang'ombe, Kenyan Anglican priest
- Peter Michiaki Nakamura, Japanese Catholic archbishop
- Peter Nead (1796–1877), German Baptist Brethren theologian
- Peter Njoka, Anglican bishop in Kenya
- Peter Nobys (c. 1480–1525), English priest and academic
- Peter Nolasco (1189–1256), 13th-century Spanish Catholic religious founder and saint
- Peter Nott (1933–2018), English Anglican bishop
- Peter Nourse (1774–1840), American clergyman and librarian
- Peter O'Donnellan (died 1778), Irish prelate
- Peter O'Higgins, Irish Dominican priest beatified in 1992
- Peter Takeo Okada (1941–2020), Japanese Catholic priest
- Peter Okpaleke (born 1963), Nigerian prelate of the Catholic Church
- Peter John Olivi (c. 1248–1298), French Franciscan theologian and philosopher
- Peter Imhona Onekpe, Anglican bishop
- Peter Owen-Jones, English Anglican priest
- Peter Paludanus (c. 1275–1342), French theologian and archbishop
- Peter Pareuzi, 12th-century Italian Roman Catholic saint
- Peter Pascual (c. 1227–1300), Mozarabic theologian, bishop and martyr
- Péter Pázmány (1570–1637), Hungarian Jesuit
- Peter Peckard, 18th-century Church of England minister and abolitionist
- Peter B. Pereira, Indian Roman Catholic bishop
- Peter Pernin (1822–1909), French missionary priest
- Peter C. Phan (born 1943), Vietnamese-born American Catholic theologian
- Peter Pilkington, Baron Pilkington of Oxenford (1933–2011), British Anglican priest
- Peter Popoff (born 1946), German-born American televangelist
- Peter Quesnel, English Franciscan
- Peter Quinel, 13th-century bishop of Exeter
- Peter Rickmann, Anglican dean
- Peter Rollock, Scottish bishop
- Peter A. Rosazza (born 1935), American prelate
- Peter Ruckman (1921–2016), American baptist minister
- Peter Rusnák (born 1950), Slovak bishop
- Peter Kwasi Sarpong (born 1933), Ghanaian Catholic archbishop
- Peter Sarsfield, Irish landowner
- Peter Schäfer (born 1943), German scholar of ancient Judaism and Christianity
- Peter Schmucker (1784–1860), Methodist minister
- Peter Selby (born 1941), British Anglican bishop
- Peter Lorenz Sellergren (1768–1843), Swedish Lutheran priest
- Peter Sertin, 20th-century Archdeacon of Northern France
- Peter Shirayanagi (1928–2009), Japanese Roman Catholic prelate
- Peter Siklósi, 14th-century Hungarian bishop
- Peter Simiyu, Anglican bishop
- Peter Skov-Jakobsen (born 1959), Danish clergyman and theologian
- Peter Smalle (fl. 1596–1615), English priest and poet
- Peter Spaak, Swedish Protestant reformer
- Peter Thomas Stanford (1858–1909), African-American religious minister and writer
- Peter Stasiuk (born 1943), Canadian-Australian Ukrainian Greek Catholic bishop
- Peter Stuart, British-born Australian Anglican bishop
- Peter Stuhlmacher (1932–2025), German theologian
- Peter Suchenwirt, Austrian poet and herald
- Peter Takaaki Hirayama (1924–2023), Japanese bishop of the Roman Catholic Church
- Peter Tasker, Anglican assistant bishop
- Peter Thyraeus (c. 1546–1601), German Jesuit theologian
- Peter Tibai, Hungarian clergyman
- Peter Toon (c. 1939–2009), Anglican theologian
- Peter Torjesen (1892–1939), Norwegian missionary
- Peter Townley, Church of England priest
- Peter Turang (1947–2025), Indonesian Catholic archbishop
- Peter Turkson (born 1948), Ghanaian Roman Catholic cardinal
- Peter J. Uglietto (born 1951), American prelate
- Peter Vaghi (born 1948), American Catholic priest
- Peter van der Bosch (1686–1736), Flemish Jesuit hagiographer
- Peter Verdaguer y Prat (1835–1911), Catholic bishop
- Peter Verhaegen (1800–1868), Belgian Jesuit
- Peter Vinke (died 1702), English divine
- Peter Volkonsky (1861–1948), Russian aristocrat
- Peter von Schaumberg (1388–1469), Bishop of Augsburg
- Peter Wadding (c. 1581–1644), Irish Jesuit theologian
- Peter Waldo, French theologian
- Peter Walkden (1684–1769), English Presbyterian minister and diarist
- Peter D. Weaver (born 1945), United Methodist Church bishop
- Peter Wentworth, 17th-century Anglican priest
- Peter Werenfels (1627–1703), Swiss theologian
- Peter Whalley (1722–c. 1791), English clergyman, academic and schoolmaster
- Peter Wheatley (born 1947), British bishop
- Peter Whitmer Sr. (1773–1854), American Mormon leader
- Peter Wieselgren (1800–1877), Swedish Lutheran priest and activist
- Peter Woodman (born 1936), British Anglican priest
- Peter Wust (1884–1940), German Christian existentialist philosopher
- Peter M. H. Wynhoven (1884–1944), Roman Catholic priest
- Peter Xu (born 1940), Chinese evangelist
- Peter Yorke (1864–1925), Irish priest and activist
- Peter Youngren, Canadian Christian evangelist
- Peter Yu Tae-chol, 19th-century Korean saint
- Peter Stephan Zurbriggen (1943–2022), Swiss Catholic archbishop

== Science ==
- Peter Abell, British social scientist
- Peter Achinstein (born 1935), American philosopher of science
- Peter Addyman (born 1939), British archaeologist
- Peter Akkermans (born 1957), Dutch archaeologist
- Peter B. Armentrout (born 1953), American chemist and academic
- Peter Artedi (1705–1735), Swedish zoologist
- Peter Ascanius (1723–1803), Norwegian-Danish scientist
- Peter J. Aspinall, British social scientist
- Peter Atteslander (1926–2016), Swiss sociologist
- Peter Ax (1927–2013), German zoologist
- Peter René Oscar Bally (1895–1980), Swiss botanist
- Peter Banister (1947–2019), British psychologist
- Peter Bannister (1939–2008), British-born New Zealand botanist
- Peter Bearman, American sociologist
- Peter Beighton (1934–2023), South African geneticist
- Peter Beilharz (born 1953), Australian sociologist
- Peter Bellwood, Australian archaeologist
- Peter M. Bentler, American psychologist
- Peter Jonas Bergius (1730–1790), Swedish botanist
- Peter Bernus (born 1949), Hungarian-Australian computer scientist
- Peter Blau (1918–2002), American sociologist
- Peter Blos (1904–1997), German-American psychoanalyst
- Peter van Emde Boas (born 1945), Dutch computer scientist
- Peter Boncz, Dutch computer scientist
- Peter Friedrich Bouché (1785–1856), German botanist and entomologist
- Peter Braam, Dutch-American computer scientist
- Peter Brazaitis (born 1936), American herpetologist
- Peter Brimblecombe, British atmospheric chemist
- Peter Oluf Brøndsted (1780–1842), Danish archaeologist
- Peter Bruce (born 1956), British chemist
- Peter A. Bruck, Austrian computer scientist
- Peter Brusilovsky, American computer scientist
- Peter Budd, British chemist
- Peter Buneman, British computer scientist
- Peter R. Buseck (born 1935), American academic and chemist
- Peter Calamai (1943–2019), Canadian science journalist
- Peter Christopher Caldwell (1927–1979), British zoologist
- Peter Carstens (1903–1945), German geneticist
- Peter Chen (born 1947), American computer scientist
- Peter A. Clayton, British archaeologist and numismatist
- Peter Coad (born 1953), American computer scientist
- Peter Copley, Australian ecologist
- Peter Corning (born 1935), American scientist
- Peter Coutts (archaeologist), Australian archaeologist
- Peter Coveney (born 1958), British chemist
- Peter Crane (born 1954), British botanist
- Peter Crittenden, British lichenologist
- Péter Csermely (born 1958), Hungarian biochemist
- Peter Dangerfield, clinical anatomist
- Peter Daszak, British zoologist
- Peter de la Mare (chemist) (1920–1989), New Zealand academic chemist
- Peter B. de Menocal, American oceanographer and paleoclimatologist
- Peter Del Tredici, American botanist and author
- Peter Dervan (born 1945), American chemist
- Peter N. Devreotes, American scientist
- Peter Dicken, British geographer
- Peter Dingle, Australian scientist
- Peter Dodge (1950–2023), American meteorologist
- Peter Dodson (born 1946), American paleontologist
- Peter C. Dodwell (1930–2006), Canadian psychologist
- Peter K. Dorhout, American chemist and professor
- Peter Dorman, American anthropologist
- Peter Downes (born 1953), British biochemist
- Peter Druschel (born 1959), German computer scientist
- Peter Duesberg (born 1936), German-American molecular biologist
- Peter Dunnill (1938–2009), British scientist
- Peter Dwyer, Australian anthropologist
- Peter Eades (born 1952), Australian computer scientist
- Peter S. Eagleson (1928–2021), American hydrologist
- Peter J. Economou, American sports psychologist
- Peter T. Ellison (born 1951), American anthropologist
- Peter Esben-Petersen (1869–1942), Danish entomologist
- Peter Excell (1948–2020), British engineer, scientist and researcher
- Peter Fairley (1930–1998), British science journalist
- Peter N. Fedorov (born 1951), Ukrainian astronomer
- Peter Flach (born 1961), Dutch computer scientist
- Peter T. Flawn (1926–2017), American geologist
- Peter Funch (born 1965), Danish zoologist
- Peter Gacs (born 1947), Hungarian-American mathematician and computer scientist
- Peter Galison (born 1955), American historian and philosopher of science
- Peter Galton (born 1942), British vertebrate paleontologist
- Peter Ginn, British archaeologist
- Peter Girguis, American scientist
- Peter Glaser (1923–2014), Czechoslovak-born American scientist and aerospace engineer
- Peter Gleick, American scientist
- Peter Glob (1911–1985), Danish archaeologist
- Peter Gluckman (born 1949), New Zealand scientist
- Peter Goldblatt (born 1943), South African-born American botanist
- Peter Goldblum, American psychologist
- Peter K. Gregersen, American geneticist
- Peter Greig-Smith (1922–2003), British botanist
- Peter Greil, German materials scientist
- Peter Griess (1829–1888), German chemist
- Peter Gruss (born 1949), German biologist
- Peter Haggett (1933–2025), British geographer and academic
- Peter Hajek, British psychologist
- Peter Harbison (1939–2023), Irish archaeologist
- Peter M. Harman (1943–2014), British historian of science
- Peter G. Hartman, English-German biochemist
- Peter Harzem (1930–2008), American/Turkish psychologist
- Peter M. Haugan (born 1958), Norwegian oceanographer
- Peter Janney, American writer and psychologist
- Peter Joseph Heald (1925–1996), British biochemist
- Peter Brian Heenan, New Zealand botanist
- Peter Herring, English marine biologist
- Peter Hinton, British archaeologist
- Peter Hiscock (born 1957), Australian archaeologist
- Peter Hochachka (1937–2002), Canadian zoologist
- Peter Huybers, American climatologist
- Peter Jalowiczor, British astronomer
- Peter Jenniskens, Dutch astronomer
- Peter Jörgensen (1870–1937), Danish entomologist
- Péter Kacsuk (born 1953), Hungarian computer scientist
- Peter Kalivas, American neuroscientist
- Peter Kaplony (1933–2011), Hungarian-Swiss Egyptologist
- Peter Keetman (1916–2005), German geographer
- Peter E. Kenmore, American entomologist
- Peter Richard Killeen (born 1942), American psychologist
- Peter Killworth (1946–2008), English scientist
- Peter Kinderman (born 1965), British psychologist
- Peter T. Kirstein (1933–2020), British computer scientist who played a significant role in the creation of the Internet
- Peter Klæboe (1929–2022), Norwegian chemist
- Peter Klason (1848–1937), Swedish chemist
- Peter Klopfer (born 1930), German-American zoologist
- Peter Kokelaar, British volcanologist
- Peter Kolény, Slovak astronomer
- Peter Kollman (1944–2001), American chemist
- Peter Koopman (born 1959), Australian biologist
- Peter Krukenberg (1787–1865), German pathologist
- Peter Kušnirák (born 1974), Slovak astronomer
- Peter Lambley (1946–2022), conservationist and lichenologist
- Peter Landin (1930–2009), British computer scientist
- Peter Larson, American paleontologist
- Peter R. Last, Australian ichthyologist
- Peter Liss (born 1942), British environmental scientist
- Peter Lockemann (born 1935), German computer scientist
- Peter Johan Lor (born 1946), Dutch librarian and library scientist
- Peter Lyman (1940–2007), American professor of information science
- Peter Maassen (1810–1890), German entomologist
- Peter MacOwan (1830–1909), British botanist
- Peter Maitlis (1933–2022), British chemist
- Peter Marsden, American sociologist
- Peter Medawar (1915–1987), British biologist and Nobel laureate
- Peter Menkhorst, Australian ecologist
- Peter Molan (1943–2015), New Zealand biochemist
- Peter Molenaar, Dutch psychologist
- Peter Monti, American psychologist
- Peter Mosses, British computer scientist
- Peter B. Moyle, American zoologist
- Peter Clive Mundy, American developmental psychologist
- Peter Murray-Rust, English chemist
- Peter Naur (1928–2016), Danish computer science pioneer
- Peter Nellist, British materials scientist
- Peter Nemes, Hungarian-American chemist
- Peter B. Neubauer (1913–2008), American psychiatrist and psychoanalyst
- Peter Nick (born 1962), German molecular biologist
- Peter Niemz (born 1950), German-born Swiss professor and wood scientist
- Peter Nordin (1965–2020), Swedish computer scientist
- Peter Norvig (born 1956), American computer scientist
- Peter Novick, American scientist
- Peter Nye (1921–2009), British soil scientist
- Peter O'Hearn (born 1963), research scientist
- Peter Okebukola (born 1948), Nigerian professor of science and computer education
- P. D. Orton (1916–2005), English mycologist
- Peter G. Ossorio (1926–2007), American psychologist
- Peter J. O'Toole, British biologist
- Peter Ouwens (1849–1922), Dutch scientist
- Péter Ovádi (born 1981), Hungarian computer scientist and politician
- Peter Paetzold (1935–2023), German chemist
- Peter Palese (born 1944), American microbiologist and virologist
- Peter Simon Pallas (1741–1811), German zoologist, botanist, and natural historian
- Peter Pauson (1925–2013), German-Jewish chemist who settled in Great Britain
- Peter N. Peregrine (born 1963), American anthropologist
- Peter Piot (born 1949), Belgian-British microbiologist
- Peter Pirolli, American computer scientist
- Peter Pritchard (1943–2020), English-born American zoologist
- Peter Propping (1942–2016), German geneticist
- Peter Pruzan, Danish organizational theorist, management consultant and Emeritus Professor
- Peter Pulay (born 1941), Hungarian theoretical chemist
- Peter H. Raven (1936–2026), American botanist
- Peter J. Rentfrow, American academic and psychologist
- Peter M. Rentzepis (born 1934), American chemist
- Peter Friedrich Röding (1767–1846), German malacologist
- Peter Rodman, scientist in anthropology and paleontology, studied primates like orangutans
- Peter Henry Rolfs (1865–1944), American-Brazilian agronomist
- Peter H. Rossi (1921–2006), American sociologist
- Peter J. Rossky, American chemist
- Peter Rubtzoff (1920–1995), Russian botanist
- Peter Rutledge, New Zealand chemist
- Peter Ružička (1947–2003), Slovak scientist
- Peter Santschi, marine scientist and an academic
- Peter Satir (1937–2022), American microbiologist
- Peter Johan Schei (1945–2022), Norwegian biologist and civil servant
- Peter Schröder, American computer scientist
- Peter J. Schwendinger (born 1959), Austrian arachnologist
- Peter Schwerdtfeger (born 1955), German chemist
- Peter Seeberger (born 1966), German chemist
- Peter Seligmann (born 1950), American conservationist and nonprofit founder
- Peter Senge (born 1947), American systems scientist
- Peter Shinnie (1915–2007), British archaeologist
- Peter Shirley (born 1963), American computer scientist
- Peter Siebold, American astronaut
- Peter Sjøholt (1925–2011), Norwegian geographer
- Peter Skabara (born 1968), British chemist
- Peter Sneath (1923–2011), British microbiologist
- Peter J. Stang (born 1941), American chemist
- Peter Suedfeld (born 1935), Hungarian-Canadian psychologist
- Péter Surján (born 1955), Hungarian theoretical chemist
- Peter Alan Sweet (1921–2005), English astronomer
- Peter Thonning (1775–1848), Danish botanist and physician
- Peter Thorstensen, Danish physician and chemist
- Peter Thrower, American materials scientist
- Peter Timms, Australian koala conservationist
- Peter Friedrich Ludwig Tischbein (1813–1883), German paleontologist
- Péter Török (born 1979), Hungarian biologist and researcher
- Peter Tsai (born 1952), Taiwanese-American material scientist and inventor
- Peter Ulric Tse (born 1962), American neuroscientist
- Peter J. Turnbaugh (born c. 1981), American microbiologist
- Peter Twinn (1916–2004), English mathematician and entomologist
- Peter Twumasi (born 1974), Ghanaian biochemist
- Peter Uggowitzer (born 1950), Austrian-Swiss metallurgist
- Peter Ungar (born 1963), American paleoanthropologist
- Peter Van de Wetering (1931–2014), Dutch-born American horticulturist
- Peter van Geersdaele (1933–2018), English conservator
- Peter Vitousek (born 1949), American ecologist
- Peter K. Vogt (born 1932), American geneticist
- Peter von Glehn (1835–1876), Baltic German botanist
- Peter P. von Weymarn (1879–1935), Russian chemist
- Peter Waage (1833–1900), Norwegian chemist
- Peter Fredrik Wahlberg (1800–1877), Swedish entomologist
- Peter Walter (born 1954), German-American molecular biologist and biochemist
- Peter Wardle (1931–2008), New Zealand botanist
- Peter B. Warr (1937–2023), British occupational psychologist
- Peter Cathcart Wason (1924–2003), English psychologist
- Peter Wasserscheid (born 1970), German chemist and engineer
- Peter Weill, Australian computer scientist
- Peter J. Weinberger (born 1942), American computer scientist
- Peter Weingart (born 1941), German sociologist
- Peter D. Welch, American scientist and researcher
- Peter Wellnhofer, German paleontologist
- Peter Jansen Wester (1877–1931), Swedish-American agricultural botanist
- Peter Jaffrey Wheatley (1921–1997), English chemist
- Peter Willett (born 1953), British chemoinformatics researcher
- Peter Wipf, American chemistry professor
- Peter Wisoff (born 1958), American astronaut
- Peter Wohlleben (born 1964), German forester and author
- Peter T. Wolczanski (born 1954), American chemist
- Peter Wonka, Austrian computer scientist
- Peter Wothers, British chemist
- Peter Woulfe, Irish chemist
- Peter John Wyllie (born 1930), British petrologist and academic
- Peter Zandstra, Canadian scientist
- Peter Ziegler (1928–2013), Swiss geologist
- Péter Zollman (1931–2013), Hungarian scientist, research physicist, engineer and inventor

=== Medicine ===
- Peter Aaby (born 1944), doctor in medicine and anthropologist
- Peter Agre (born 1949), American physician and academic
- Peter Daniel Anthonisz (1822–1903), Sri Lankan Burgher doctor, 1st President of the Ceylon Branch of the British Medical Association
- Peter Bach, American medical researcher
- Peter Barwick, English physician and author
- Peter Baskett (1934–2008), Northern Irish physician
- Peter Bowne, English physician
- Peter Boylan, Irish obstetrician
- Peter Brambleby, English public health doctor
- Peter Breggin (born 1936), American psychiatrist
- Peter Brinsden (born 1940), British fertility doctor
- Peter Burney, British epidemiologist
- Peter Buschang (born 1951), American orthodontist
- Peter Buxtun (1937–2024), American epidemiologist
- Peter Bryce (1853–1932), Canadian government physician
- Peter Calabresi, American neurologist
- Peter Canvane, American physician
- Peter Carmeliet (born 1959), Belgian physician and professor
- Peter Choong, Australian doctor
- Peter Clare (c. 1738–1786), British surgeon
- Peter Conder (1919–1993), British ornithologist
- Peter Copeman (1932–2018), English dermatologist
- Peter B. Cotton, British gastroenterologist
- Peter Dayan (born 1965), British researcher in computational neuroscience
- Peter DeMarco (1932–2005), American physician
- Peter Dirck Keyser (1835–1897), American ophthalmologist
- Peter Ellaway, British neuroscientist
- Peter Elsbach (1924–2020), Dutch physician
- Péter Érdi (born 1946), Hungarian-American computational neuroscientist
- Peter Essex-Lopresti (1916–1951), British orthopedic surgeon
- Peter Fonagy (born 1952), British psychoanalyst
- Peter Freyer (1851–1921), Irish surgeon
- Peter Froggatt (1928–2020), Northern Irish doctor and academic
- Peter Furness, British pathologist
- Peter Adolph Gad (1846–1907), Danish ophthalmologist
- Peter Gaehtgens (born 1937), German physiologist
- Peter Goadsby, Australian neuroscientist and physician
- Peter C. Gøtzsche (born 1949), Danish physician and medical researcher
- Peter Grinspoon (born 1966), American physician
- Peter Gottfried Kremsner, Austrian physician
- Peter Grootenhuis (1960–2019), Dutch-American medicinal chemist
- Peter Hagoort (born 1954), Dutch neuroscientist
- Peter David Handyside, Scottish surgeon and anatomist
- Peter Hennis, British physician
- Peter Hersh, American ophthalmologist
- Peter F. Hjort (1924–2011), Norwegian medical academic
- Peter Horby, British physician and epidemiologist
- Peter Hotez (born 1958), American scientist, pediatrician and advocate
- Peter M. Howley (born 1946), American physician
- Peter Hurley (doctor) (1940–1983), New Zealand doctor
- Peter Imoesi, Nigerian molecular neurosurgeon
- Peter Jahrling, American virologist
- Peter J. Jannetta (1932–2016), American neurosurgeon
- Peter Jepson-Young (1957–1992), Canadian medical doctor
- Peter Jüni, Swiss physician
- Peter Kazembe (1954–2020), Malawian pediatrician
- Peter Kerley (1900–1979), Irish doctor
- Peter Kesling (1932–2022), American orthodontist
- Peter C. Klatsky, American fertility doctor
- Peter Klinken (born 1953), Australian medical researcher and academic
- Peter R. Kowey (born 1950), American cardiologist and medical researcher
- Peter H. Krammer (born 1946), German immunologist
- Peter Kranke (born 1973), German anesthesiologist
- Peter Lachmann (1931–2020), British immunologist
- Peter Lamelas, Cuban-American physician
- Peter LaMotte (1929–2007), American physician
- Peter M. Lansdorp (born 1952), Dutch medical researcher
- Peter Lansdown (born 1947), Welsh ornithologist
- Peter Larkins (born 1954), Australian doctor and media personality
- Peter Lennie, American neuroscientist
- Peter Libby (born 1947), American cardiologist
- Peter MacCallum (1885–1974), Australian oncologist
- Peter Macklem (1931–2011), Canadian doctor and administrator
- Peter McCullagh (born 1952), Irish statistician
- Peter McGuffin (1949–2024), British psychiatrist and geneticist
- Peter Laird McKinlay (1901–1972), Scottish medical statistician
- Peter Millard (1937–2018), British physician
- Peter Monau (1551–1588), German physician
- Peter Muennig, American public health researcher
- Peter Mugyenyi, Ugandan physician
- Peter Jonathan Murray (born 1965), Australian-American immunologist and biochemist
- Peter Nowell (1928–2016), American cancer researcher
- Peter Oehme, German pharmacologist
- Peter Ormerod (1950–2019), English chest physician
- Peter Orris, American physician
- Peter Ludvig Panum (1820–1885), Danish physiologist and pathologist
- Peter Panzica (born 1965), American medical academic
- Peter Pharoah (1934–2021), British public health professor
- Peter Pronovost (born 1965), American physician
- Peter Pusey (born 1942), British physician
- Peter J. Ratcliffe (born 1954), British nephrologist
- Peter Rathjen (born 1964), Australian medical researcher
- Peter Remondino (1846–1926), American physician
- Peter M. Rhee (born 1961), American surgeon
- Peter Safar (1924–2003), Austrian physician
- Peter Salama (1968–2020), Australian epidemiologist
- Peter Sarnow, German virologist
- Peter Schantz, Swedish physiologist
- Peter Scheiffele (born 1969), German neurobiologist
- Peter Scott-Morgan (1958–2022), English-American organizational theorist and robotics expert
- Peter Selvaratnam, Australian musculoskeletal physiotherapist
- Peter Sleight (1929–2020), British cardiologist
- Peter Staats, American physician
- Peter Stenvinkel (born 1957), Swedish nephrologist and academic
- Peter Strick (born 1946), American neurobiologist
- Peter Szatmari, Canadian autism researcher
- Peter Szurman (born 1968), German ophthalmologist
- Peter J. Taub, American surgeon
- Peter Templeman (1711–1769), English physician
- Peter Tippett (born 1953), American physician, researcher and inventor
- Peter Tishler (1937–2021), American physician and academic
- Peter Tizard (1916–1993), British pediatrician
- Peter Tugwell (born 1944), Canadian physician
- Peter Valent (born 1962), Austrian hematologist and stem cell researcher
- Peter Visscher, Dutch-born Australian geneticist
- Peter Voswinckel (born 1951), German physician, author and medical historian
- Peter Kyobe Waiswa (born 1971), Ugandan researcher, doctor and academic administrator
- Peter Weissberg, British physician
- Peter Wiedemann (born 1953), German ophthalmologist
- Peter Wildy (1920–1987), British virologist
- Peter Wilmshurst, British medical doctor and whistleblower
- Peter Yellowlees, British-born American physician
- Peter Zanca (1908–1976), American physician

=== Physics ===
- Peter C. Aichelburg (born 1941), Austrian physicist
- Peter Armbruster (1931–2024), German physicist
- Peter Barham (born 1950), British physicist
- Peter Bergmann (1915–2002), German-American physicist
- Peter Bosted, American physicist
- Peter Brancazio (1939–2020), American physicist and professor
- Peter Capak, Canadian astrophysicist and technology researcher
- Peter Clift, British marine geologist and geophysicist
- Peter Coles (born 1963), British astrophysicist
- Peter Debye (1884–1966), Dutch-American physical chemist
- Peter Demos (1918–2012), American physicist
- Peter L. P. Dillon (born 1934), American physicist
- Peter Dornan, British physicist
- Peter Duncumb (born 1931), British physicist
- Peter Fellgett (1922–2008), British physicist
- Peter Fiekowsky, American physicist and author
- Peter Finke, German theoretical physicist
- Peter Fowler (1923–1996), British physicist
- Peter Fratzl (born 1958), Austrian physicist
- Peter Fulde (1936–2024), German physicist
- Peter Garnavich, American astronomer and physicist
- Peter Gierasch (1941–2023), American astronomer and astrophysicist
- Peter Grassberger (born 1940), Austrian physicist
- Peter Goldreich (born 1939), American astrophysicist
- Peter Grünberg (1939–2018), German physicist
- Peter Gumbsch (born 1962), German physicist and materials scientist
- Peter Hänggi (born 1950), Swiss physicist
- Peter Hegemann (born 1954), German biophysicist
- Peter Heszler (1958–2009), Hungarian physicist
- Peter Higgs (1929–2024), British theoretical physicist
- Peter Hirschfeld (born 1957), American physicist
- Peter Hofstee (born 1962), Dutch physicist and computer scientist
- Peter D. Jarvis, Australian physicist
- Peter Jenni (born 1948), Swiss physicist
- Peter Jezzard (born 1965), British physicist and professor
- Peter Kolbe (1675–1726), German teacher, astronomer, ethnologist and explorer
- Peter Kollock (1959–2009), American sociologist
- Peter LeComber (1941–1992), British physicist and academic
- Péter Lévai (born 1962), Hungarian physicist
- Peter Littlewood (1955–2026), British physicist
- Peter Lu, American-Canadian post-doctoral researcher
- Peter Mansfield (1933–2017), English physicist known for magnetic resonance imaging
- Peter Mark Roget (1779–1869), British physician and philologist
- Peter Mazur (1922–2001), Dutch physicist
- Peter V. E. McClintock (born 1940), British physicist
- Péter Mészáros (born 1943), American astrophysicist
- Peter W. Milonni (born 1947), American theoretical physicistentom
- Peter V. E. McClintock (born 1940), British physicist
- Peter Michelson, American physicist
- Peter Millman (1906–1990), Canadian astronomer
- Peter Milner (1919–2018), British-Canadian neuroscientist
- Peter Minkowski (born 1941), Swiss theoretical physicist
- Peter Nilson (1937–1998), Swedish astronomer and novelist
- Peter Nordlander (born 1955), Swedish physicist
- Peter Norreys, British professor of internal fusion science
- Peter Pershan, American physicist
- Peter Kristian Prytz (c. 1851–1929), Danish physicist
- Peter Ridd, Australian ocean researcher
- Peter Salcher (1928–2008), Austrian physicist
- Peter Saulson (born 1954), American physicist and professor
- Peter Schattschneider (born 1950), Austrian physicist
- Peter Scheuer (1930–2001), British astrophysicist
- Peter Schlosser, German physicist, planetary scientist and academic administrator
- Peter Shawhan (born 1968), American physicist
- Peter Sorokin (1931–2015), American physicist
- Péter Szalay (born 1940), Hungarian chemist
- Peter Thejll, Danish astrophysicist and climate researcher
- Peter Adolf Thiessen (1899–1990), German physical chemist
- Peter Thonemann (1917–2018), Australian-born British physicist
- Peter E. Toschek (1933–2020), German physicist
- Peter J. Twin (born 1937), British physicist
- Peter Vail (1930–2024), American geologist
- Peter van de Kamp (1901–1995), Dutch astronomer
- Peter van Nieuwenhuizen (born 1938), Dutch theoretical physicist
- Peter Westervelt (1919–2015), American physicist
- Peter Woit (born 1957), American theoretical physicist
- Peter Guy Wolynes (born 1953), American theoretical chemist and physicist
- Peter Wyder (1934–2024), Swiss physicist
- Peter Zimmerman (1941–2021), American nuclear physicist
- Peter Zoller (born 1952), Austrian theoretical physicist

=== Political science ===
- Peter Andreas, American political scientist
- Peter Berkowitz (born 1959), American political scientist and legal scholar
- Peter Burnham, British political scientist
- Peter Feaver (born 1961), American political scientist
- Peter Fenn (born 1947), American political scientist
- Peter L. Francia, American political scientist
- Peter Gourevitch, American political scientist
- Peter J. Katzenstein (born 1945), German-American political scientist
- Peter Kurrild-Klitgaard (born 1966), Danish academic: political scientist
- Peter Nailor (1928–1996), British political scientist
- Peter Nedergaard (born 1957), Danish political scientist
- Peter H. Odegard (1901–1966), American political scientist and college administrator
- Peter Potichnyj (born 1930), Ukrainian-born American and Canadian political scientist and historian
- Peter Reddaway (1939–2024), British-American political scientist
- Peter W. Schramm (1946–2015), American political scientist and academic
- Peter Uvin, American political scientist
- Peter Vale (born 1947), South African political scientist
- Peter J. Woolley, American political scientist

== Sports ==
=== Air racing ===
- Peter Podlunšek (born 1970), Slovenian air racer

=== Alpine skiing ===
- Peter Bosinger (born 1965), Canadian alpine skier and coach
- Peter Boumphrey (1919–2004), British alpine skier
- Peter Brockhoff (1936–2025), Australian alpine skier
- Peter Dürr (born 1960), German alpine skier
- Peter Forras (born 1964), Australian alpine skier
- Peter Frei (born 1946), Swiss alpine skier
- Peter Fuchs (skier) (1955–1980), British alpine skier
- Peter Jurko (born 1967), Slovak alpine skier
- Péter Kristály (born 1967), Hungarian alpine skier
- Peter Lakota (born 1937), Slovenian alpine skier
- Peter Mally (born 1958), Italian alpine skier
- Peter Pappenheim (1926–2021), Dutch alpine skier
- Peter Pen (born 1972), Slovenian alpine skier
- Peter Perner, Austrian para-alpine skier
- Peter Poetscher, Austrian para-alpine skier
- Peter Portisch, West German para-alpine skier
- Peter Rohr (born 1945), Swiss alpine skier
- Peter Runggaldier (born 1968), Italian alpine skier
- Peter Rzehak (born 1970), Austrian alpine skier
- Peter Seilern (born 1936), British alpine skier
- Péter Szikla (1923–?), Hungarian alpine skier
- Peter Torrens (1934–2007), British alpine skier
- Peter Wirnsberger (born 1958), Austrian alpine skier
- Peter Wirnsberger II (born 1958), Austrian alpine skier

=== American football ===
- Peter Badovinac (born 1989), American football coach
- Peter Blackbear (1899–1976), American football player
- Peter Boquel (1873–1950, American football coach
- Peter Boulware (born 1974), American football player
- Peter Bowden (born 2001), American football player
- Peter Christofilakos (born 1981), American football and soccer player
- Peter Cronan (born 1955), American football player
- Peter Demmerle (1953–2007), American football player
- Peter Gardere (born 1969), American football player
- Peter Gent (1942–2011), American football player and author
- Peter Giunta (American football) (born 1956), American football coach
- Peter Kalambayi (born 1995), American football player
- Peter Konz (born 1989), American football player
- Peter Lamana (1921–2007), American football player
- Peter Manuma (born 2003), American football player
- Peter Mazzaferro (1930–2025), American football player and coach
- Peter Pujals (born 1995), American football player
- Peter Pund (1907–1987), American football player
- Peter Rajkovich (1911–1979), American football player
- Peter Rossomando (born 1972), American football player and coach
- Peter Shorts (born 1966), American football player
- Peter Skoronski (born 2001), American football player
- Peter Stuursma (born 1971), American football player and coach
- Peter Tuiasosopo (1963–2025), American football player and actor
- Peter Tuipulotu (born 1969), Tongan gridiron football player
- Peter Vaas (born 1952), American football player and coach
- Peter Warrick (born 1977), American football player
- Peter Westerhaus (born 1992), American football player
- Peter Woods (American football) (born 2005), American football player
- Peter Yetten, American college football coach

=== Archery ===
- Peter Boukouvalas (born 1998), Australian archer
- Peter Gillam (born 1956), British archer
- Peter Kinik (born 1986), Slovak Paralympic archer
- Peter Koprivnikar (born 1976), Slovenian archer
- Peter Mitterer (archer) (born 1947), Austrian archer
- Peter Stecher (born 1965), Austrian archer and writer

=== Athletics ===
- Peter Allday (1927–2018), British hammer thrower
- Péter Bácsalmási (1908–1981), Hungarian athlete
- Péter Bakosi (born 1993), Hungarian high jumper
- Peter Beames (born 1963), Australian athlete
- Peter Bernreuther (born 1946), German sprinter
- Peter Blanchfield (1910–1959), Irish hurdler
- Peter Blank (born 1962), German track and field athlete
- Peter Bloch (1923–1976), Norwegian track and field athlete
- Peter Blount, American sprinter and bobsledder
- Peter Borglund (born 1964), Swedish javelin thrower
- Péter Botfa (born 1979), Hungarian hammer thrower
- Peter Bouschen (born 1960), German triple jumper
- Peter Boyce (born 1946), Australian high jumper
- Peter Callahan (born 1991), Belgian-American middle-distance runner
- Peter Ceesay (born 1959), Gambian middle-distance runner
- Peter Ceesay (born 1959), Gambian middle-distance runner
- Peter Chebet (born 1974), Kenyan long-distance runner
- Peter Kiplagat Chebet (born 1982), Kenyan long-distance runner
- Peter Chumba (born 1968), Kenyan long-distance runner
- Peter Clentzos (1909–2006), Greek-American pole vaulter
- Peter Coe (1919–2008), British athlete
- Peter Coghlan (born 1975), Irish track and field athlete
- Peter Čögley (born 1988), Slovak athlete
- Peter Daenens (born 1960), Belgian middle-distance runner
- Peter Dajia (born 1964), Canadian shot putter
- Peter Deer (1878–1956), Canadian middle-distance runner
- Peter Donato, Canadian marathon runner
- Peter Driver (1932–1971), British long-distance runner
- Péter Deutsch (born 1968), Hungarian high jumper
- Peter Elvy (born 1980), Australian discus thrower
- Peter Emelieze (born 1988), Nigerian-born German sprinter
- Peter Esenwein (born 1967), German javelin thrower
- Peter Esiri (born 1928), Nigerian triple jumper
- Peter Fryer (athlete) (1928–1999), English sprinter
- Peter Gabbett (born 1941), British athlete
- Peter Gamper (born 1940), German sprinter
- Peter Genyn (born 1976), Belgian athlete and wheelchair rugby player
- Peter Clarence Gerhardt (1877–1952), American sprinter
- Peter Glans (born 1993), Danish long-distance runner
- Peter Gottwald Jr., American Paralympic athlete
- Peter Haase (born 1943), German sprinter
- Peter Haber (athlete), German Paralympian
- Peter Häggström (born 1976), Swedish athlete
- Peter Hanlin (1931–2000), Australian shot putter
- Peter Hargraves (born 1972), American sprinter
- Peter Herzog (born 1987), Austrian long-distance runner
- Peter Hildreth (1928–2011), British hurdler
- Peter Horák (born 1983), Slovak high jumper
- Peter Kamais (born 1976), Kenyan long-distance runner
- Péter Karádi (1926–2011), Hungarian sprinter
- Peter Kieweg, Austrian Paralympic athlete
- Peter Cheruiyot Kirui (born 1988), Kenyan long-distance runner
- Peter Korčok (born 1974), Slovak race walker
- Peter Laeng (born 1942), Swiss sprinter
- Peter Laufer (athlete) (1936–2016), German pole vaulter
- Peter Lomong (born 1996), American athletics competitor
- Peter Maru (born 2003), Ugandan long-distance runner
- Peter McColgan (born 1963), Northern Irish athlete
- Peter Mullins (1926–2012), Australian decathlete
- Peter Muster (born 1952), Swiss sprinter
- Peter Mwita, Tanzanian sprinter
- Peter Norman (1942–2006), Australian sprinter
- Peter Nowill (born 1979), Australian long-distance runner
- Peter Ogilvie (1972–2024), Canadian sprinter
- Peter Okodogbe (born 1958), Nigerian sprinter
- Peter Pascoe (born 1953), Australian Paralympic athlete
- Péter Parsch (born 1936), Hungarian middle-distance runner
- Peter Pearless (born 1957), New Zealand middle-distance runner
- Peter Philipp (athlete) (born 1972), Swiss middle-distance runner
- Peter Pulu (born 1975), Papua New Guinean sprinter
- Peter Radford (born 1939), British sprinter
- Peter Rapp (born 1983), German long jumper
- Peter Renner (born 1959), Olympic steeplechase runner
- Peter Riebensahm (born 1938), German high jumper
- Peter Rono (born 1967), Kenyan middle-distance runner
- Peter Rwamuhanda (1953–2008), Ugandan hurdler
- Peter Sack (born 1979), German shot putter
- Peter Schreiber (born 1964), German javelin thrower
- Peter Seddon (born 1937), British athlete
- Peter Sherry (born 1968), American long-distance runner
- Peter Shmock (born 1950), American shot putter
- Peter Kimeli Some (born 1990), Kenyan long-distance runner
- Peter Snell (1938–2019), New Zealand middle-distance runner
- Peter Spir (born 1955), Canadian middle-distance runner
- Peter Sternad (1946–2022), Austrian athlete
- Peter Svet (born 1949), Slovenian/Yugoslav long-distance runner
- Péter Szemeti (born 1988), Hungarian middle-distance runner
- Peter Tichý (born 1969), Slovak racewalker
- Péter Tölgyesi (born 1981), Hungarian triple jumper
- Peter van der Westhuizen (born 1984), South African middle-distance runner
- Peter Van Miltenburg (born 1957), Australian sprinter
- Peter Vassella (1941–2024), Australian sprinter
- Peter Vivian (born 1970), British hammer thrower
- Peter Wallach (born 1938), German sprinter
- Peter Warden (born 1941), British athlete
- Peter Wekesa (born 1961), Kenyan sprinter
- Peter Widén (born 1967), Swedish pole vaulter
- Peter Winter (athlete) (born 1971), Australian decathlete
- Peter Wirz (born 1960), Swiss middle-distance runner
- Peter Zupanc (born 1982), Slovenian javelin thrower

=== Australian rules football ===
- Peter Agrums (born 1940), Australian rules footballer
- Peter Aitken (Australian footballer) (born 1934), Australian rules footballer
- Peter Bampton (1896–1968), Australian rules footballer
- Peter Banfield (born 1965), Australian rules footballer
- Peter Barran (born 1936), Australian rules footballer
- Peter Bedford (sportsman) (born 1947), Australian rules footballer and cricketer
- Peter Berbakov (born 1973), Australian rules footballer
- Peter Bevilacqua (1933–2025), Australian rules footballer
- Peter Bosustow (1957–2025), Australian rules footballer
- Peter Box (1932–2018), Australian rules footballer
- Peter Boyne (born 1944), Australian rules footballer
- Peter Bradbury (born 1958), Australian rules footballer
- Peter Brain (footballer) (born 1944), Australian rules footballer
- Peter Brenchley (1936–1991), Australian rules footballer
- Peter Bubner (born 1961), Australian rules footballer
- Peter Burgoyne (born 1978), Australian rules footballer
- Peter Castrikum (1943–2015), Australian rules footballer
- Peter Caven (born 1970), Australian rules footballer
- Peter Charleston (born 1930), Australian rules footballer
- Peter Chilton (born 1948), Australian rules footballer
- Peter Chisnall (born 1949), Australian rules footballer
- Peter Chitty (1912–1996), Australian rules footballer
- Peter Clancy (born 1935), Australian rules footballer
- Peter Cleal (1903–1979), Australian rules footballer
- Peter Cloke (born 1951), Australian rules footballer
- Peter Corkran (born 1948), Australian rules footballer
- Peter Cransberg (born 1967), Australian rules footballer
- Peter Crimmins (1948–1976), Australian rules footballer
- Peter Curtain (born 1962), Australian rules footballer
- Peter Czerkaski (born 1964), Australian rules footballer
- Peter Daicos (born 1961), Australian rules footballer
- Peter Dalwood (1922–2000), Australian rules footballer
- Peter Darley (born 1944), Australian rules footballer
- Peter Densley (born 1964), Australian rules footballer
- Peter Dilnot (born 1952), Australian rules footballer
- Peter Dolling (born 1941), Australian rules footballer
- Peter Dalwood (1922–2000), Australian rules footballer
- Peter Eakins (1947–1999), Australian rules footballer
- Peter Ennals (born 1943), Australian rules footballer
- Peter Everitt (born 1974), Australian rules footballer
- Peter Faulks (born 1988), Australian rules footballer
- Peter Featherby (born 1951), Australian rules footballer
- Peter Filandia (born 1970), Australian rules footballer
- Peter Fitzpatrick (footballer) (born 1959), Australian rules footballer
- Peter Fyffe (born 1951), Australian rules footballer
- Peter Garratt (born 1956), Australian rules footballer
- Peter German (born 1965), Australian rules footballer and coach
- Peter Halsall (born 1958), Australian rules footballer
- Peter Hardiman (1905–1971), Australian rules footballer
- Peter Hickmott (1954–2015), Australian rules footballer
- Peter Hines (born 1948), Australian rules footballer
- Peter Huntley (born 1961), Australian rules footballer
- Peter Kanis (1931–2021), Australian rules footballer
- Peter Keays (born 1955), Australian rules footballer
- Peter Keenan (born 1951), Australian rules footballer
- Peter Kenny (footballer) (born 1959), Australian rules footballer
- Peter Kiel (born 1958), Australian rules footballer
- Peter Knights (born 1946), Australian rules footballer
- Peter Ladhams (born 1998), Australian rules footballer
- Peter Laughlin (born 1956), Australian rules footballer
- Peter Light (born 1960), Australian rules footballer
- Peter Linke (born 1949), Australian rules footballer
- Peter Loughran (born 1940), Australian rules footballer
- Peter Lyon (born 1941), Australian rules footballer
- Peter Maloni (born 1964), Australian rules footballer
- Peter Marchesi (born 1933), Australian rules footballer
- Peter Marker (born 1949), Australian rules footballer
- Peter Marquis (1932–2005), Australian rules footballer
- Peter Matera (born 1969), Australian rules footballer
- Peter Maynard (born 1960), Australian rules footballer
- Peter McConville (born 1958), Australian rules footballer
- Peter McLaren (footballer) (1923–1996), Australian rules footballer
- Peter McMurrich (1886–1960), Australian rules footballer
- Peter McRae (footballer) (born 1937), Australian rules footballer
- Peter Melesso (born 1961), Australian rules footballer
- Peter Menaglio (born 1958), Australian rules footballer
- Peter Metropolis (born 1944), Australian rules footballer and administrator
- Peter Morcom (1923–2007), Australian rules footballer
- Peter Motley (born 1964), Australian rules footballer
- Peter Murnane (born 1955), Australian rules footballer
- Peter Neville, Australian rules footballer
- Peter Obst (1937–2017), Australian rules footballer
- Peter O'Donohue (1923–2012), Australian rules footballer
- Peter Oatey (born 1946), South Australian sportsman
- Peter O'Keefe (footballer) (born 1956), Australian rules footballer
- Peter O'Shea (born 1945), Australian rules footballer
- Peter Pettigrew (born 1950), Australian rules footballer
- Peter Pianto (1929–2008), Australian rules footballer and coach
- Peter Reville (1904–1970), Australian rules footballer
- Peter Riccardi (born 1972), Australian rules footballer
- Peter Rohde (born 1964), Australian rules footballer
- Peter Roozendaal (born 1962), Australian rules footballer
- Peter Rosenbrock (1939–2005), Australian rules footballer
- Peter Ruscuklic (1955–2014), Australian rules footballer
- Peter Sartori (born 1964), Australian rules footballer
- Peter Schwab (born 1960), Australian rules footballer
- Peter Shanahan (born 1946), Australian rules footballer
- Peter Sherman (1925–2008), Australian rules footballer
- Peter Slade (born 1954), Australian rules footballer
- Peter Somerville (born 1968), Australian rules footballer
- Peter Steward (born 1942), Australian rules footballer
- Peter Street (born 1980), Australian rules footballer
- Peter Sumich (born 1968), Australian rules footballer
- Peter Tannock (born 1940), Australian rules footballer
- Peter Tippett (footballer) (1926–1990), Australian rules footballer
- Peter Tossol (born 1962), Australian rules footballer
- Peter Weekes (1947–1994), Australian rules footballer
- Peter Weidemann (1940–2012), Australian rules footballer
- Peter Weightman (born 1949), Australian rules footballer and coach
- Peter Whyte (born 1969), Australian rules footballer
- Peter Woite, Australian rules footballer
- Peter Worsfold (born 1970), Australian rules footballer
- Peter Yagmoor (born 1993), Australian rules footballer
- Peter Yeo (1947–2023), Australian rules footballer
- Peter Zychla (born 1963), Australian rules footballer

=== Badminton ===
- Peter Axelsson (born 1967), Swedish badminton player
- Peter Gade (born 1976), Danish badminton player
- Peter Käsbauer (born 1988), German badminton player
- Peter Knowles (badminton) (born 1969), British badminton player
- Peter Steffensen (born 1979), Danish badminton player
- Peter Zauner (born 1983), Austrian badminton player

=== Bandy ===
- Peter Winbäck (born 1982), Swedish bandy player

=== Baseball ===
- Peter Alonso (born 1994), American baseball player
- Peter Bergeron (born 1977), American baseball player
- Peter Bourjos (born 1987), American baseball player
- Peter Ciofrone (1983), American baseball player
- Peter Fatse (born 1987), American baseball coach
- Peter Gahan, Australian baseball player
- Peter Hoy (born 1966), Canadian baseball player
- Peter Maestrales (born 1979), Greek baseball player
- Peter McLaughlin (umpire) (1884–1959), American baseball umpire
- Peter Moylan (born 1978), Australian baseball player
- Peter Nyari (born 1971), Italian baseball player
- Peter Rasmusen (born 1980), Greek baseball player
- Peter Solomon (baseball) (born 1996), American baseball player
- Peter Strzelecki (born 1994), American baseball player

=== Basketball ===
- Peter Ali (born 1956), Australian basketball player
- Peter Aluma (1973–2020), Nigerian basketball player
- Peter Bumbers (1926–1984), American basketball player
- P. J. Carlesimo (born 1949), American basketball coach
- Peter Cipriano (born 1983), American-Cape Verdean basketball player
- Peter Demos (1925–2011), Australian basketball player
- Peter Ezugwu (born 1976), English basketball player
- Peter Fehse (born 1983), German basketball player
- Peter Finbow (born 1975), British wheelchair basketball player
- Peter Guarasci (born 1974), Canadian basketball player
- Peter Gunterberg (born 1956), Swedish basketball player
- Peter Hooley (born 1992), Australian basketball player
- Peter Jok (born 1994), South Sudanese basketball player
- Peter Lisicky (born 1976), American basketball player
- Péter Lóránt (born 1985), Hungarian basketball player
- Peter Moss (basketball) (born c. 1959/60), American college basketball player
- Péter Papp (1930–1958), Hungarian basketball player
- Peter Pokai (born 1965), New Zealand basketball player
- Peter Rajniak (1953–2000), Slovak basketball player
- Peter John Ramos (born 1985), Puerto Rican basketball player
- Peter Roby (born 1957), American basketball coach
- Peter Salzberg, American basketball coach
- Peter Scantlebury (born 1963), British basketball player and coach
- Peter Sedmák (born 1985), Slovak basketball player
- Peter Soteropoulos (born 1981), Greek basketball player
- Peter Thibeaux (born 1961), American basketball player
- Peter van Noord (born 1963), Dutch basketball player
- Peter van Paassen (born 1978), Dutch basketball player
- Peter Verhoeven (born 1959), American basketball player
- Peter Vogler (born 1964), Australian basketball player and coach

=== Biathlon ===
- Peter Angerer (born 1959), German biathlete
- Peter Dascoulias (born 1949), American biathlete
- Peter Dokl (born 1985), Slovenian biathlete
- Peter Gerig (born 1934), Swiss biathlete
- Peter Hoag Jr. (born 1954), American biathlete
- Peter Karns (born 1945), American biathlete
- Peter Sendel (born 1972), German biathlete
- Peter Sjödén (born 1967), Swedish biathlete
- Peter Zelinka (1957–2021), Slovak biathlete

=== Bobsleigh ===
- Peter Blakeley (born 1946), Canadian bobsledder
- Peter Blount (born 1962 or 1963), American sprinter and bobsledder
- Peter Hell (born 1947), German bobsledder
- Peter Jansson (born 1955), Swedish bobsledder
- Peter Kienast (1949–1991), Austrian bobsledder
- Peter Kolotouros (born 1968), Greek bobsledder
- Peter Leismüller (born 1968), Austrian bobsledder
- Péter Pallai (born 1963), Hungarian bobsledder
- Peter Schärer, Swiss bobsledder
- Peter Utzschneider (born 1946), German bobsledder

=== Boccia ===
- Peter McGuire (born 1982), Scottish Boccia player

=== Bodybuilding ===
- Peter Joseph Gnalian (born 1960), Indian bodybuilder
- Peter Putnam (bodybuilder) (born 1976), American bodybuilder

=== Boxing ===
- Peter Anok, Sudanese boxer
- Peter Ayesu (born 1962), Malawian boxer
- Peter Boddington (1942–2020), English boxer
- Peter Brander (1927–2013), British boxer
- Peter Bulinga (born 1962), Kenyan boxer
- Peter Crotty (1925–2003), Irish boxer
- Peter Culshaw (born 1973), English boxer
- Peter Dula (born 1947), Kenyan boxer
- Peter English (boxer) (born 1963), British boxer
- Peter Felix (1866–1926), Australian boxer
- Peter Foran (1927–2001), Irish boxer
- Peter D. Fuller (1923–2012), American auto dealer, racehorse owner, and boxer
- Peter Hrivňák (born 1965), Slovak boxer
- Peter Hussing (1948–2012), German boxer
- Peter Jørgensen (1907–1992), Danish boxer
- Peter Kadiru (born 1997), German boxer
- Peter Kariuki Ngumi (born 1977), Kenyan boxer
- Peter Keenan (boxer) (1928–2000), Scottish boxer
- Peter Konyegwachie (born 1965), Nigerian boxer
- Peter Manfredo Jr. (born 1980), American boxer
- Peter Mathebula (1952–2020), South African boxer
- Peter McDonagh (born 1977), Irish boxer
- Peter McGrail (born 1996), English boxer
- Peter McNeeley (born 1968), American boxer
- Peter Müllenberg (born 1987), Dutch boxer
- Peter Oboh (born 1968), Nigerian-born British boxer
- Peter Okumu (born 1962), Ugandan boxer
- Peter Prause (born 1943), German boxer
- Peter Quillin (born 1983), American boxer
- Peter Silva (born 1964), Brazilian boxer
- Peter Sturholdt (1885–1919), American boxer
- Peter Talanti, Zambian boxer
- Peter Tiepold (born 1945), East German boxer
- Peter Till (boxer) (born 1963), English boxer
- Peter Mungai Warui (born 1981), Kenyan boxer
- Peter Waterman (1934–1986), English boxer
- Peter Weiss (boxer) (1938–2021), Austrian boxer
- Peter Zivic (1901–1987), American boxer

=== Bridge ===
- Peter Bertheau, Swedish bridge player
- Peter Boyd (born 1950), American bridge player
- Peter Pender (1936–1990), American bridge player and figure skater
- Peter Weichsel (1943), American bridge player

=== Canadian football ===
- Peter Adjey (born 1999), Canadian football player
- Peter Connellan, Canadian football coach
- Peter Crepin (born 1952), Canadian football player
- Peter Dalla Riva (born 1945), Canadian football player
- Peter Dyakowski (born 1984), Canadian football player
- Peter Godber (Canadian football) (born 1994), Canadian football player
- Peter Kempf (born 1939), Canadian football player
- Peter Kudryk (born 1948), Canadian football player
- Peter Nicastro (born 1999), Canadian football player
- Peter Quinney (born 1986), Canadian football fullback

=== Canoeing ===
- Peter Ammann (born 1957), Swiss sprint canoeist
- Peter Bäni (born 1945), Swiss slalom canoeist
- Peter Cibák (born 1981), Slovak slalom canoeist
- Peter Czupryna, German canoeist
- Peter Deyo (born 1957), American sprint canoeist
- Peter Eckhardt (born 1960), Australian slalom canoeist
- Peter Ekström, Swedish canoeist
- Peter Fauster, Austrian canoeist
- Peter Gelle (born 1984), Slovak canoeist
- Peter Genders (born 1959), Australian sprint canoeist
- Peter Guzelj (born 1949), Yugoslav slalom canoeist
- Peter Hochschorner (born 1979), Slovak slalom canoeist
- Peter Kauzer (born 1983), Slovenian slalom kayaker
- Péter Konecsny, Hungarian sprint canoeist
- Peter Kretschmer (born 1992), German canoeist
- Peter Liljedahl (born 1967), Swedish canoeist
- Peter Linksted (born 2002), British canoeist
- Peter Matti (born 1965), Swiss canoeist
- Peter Orban (born 1961), Swedish sprint canoeist
- Peter Páleš (born 1967), Czechoslovak-Slovak sprint canoeist
- Peter Patasi (born 1948), Canadian canoeist
- Péter Povázsay (1946–2024), Hungarian canoeist
- Peter Ribe (born 1966), Norwegian canoeist
- Peter Škantár (born 1982), Slovak slalom canoeist
- Peter Šoška (born 1976), Slovak slalom canoeist
- Péter Szittya (1915–?), Hungarian canoeist
- Peter van Stipdonk, Dutch canoeist
- Péter Várhelyi (born 1950), Hungarian canoeist
- Péter Völgyi (born 1950), Hungarian sprint canoeist
- Peter Weigand (1941–2011), American sprint canoeist
- Peter Žnidaršič (born 1992), Slovenian canoeist

=== Chess ===
- Péter Ács (born 1981), Hungarian chess grandmaster
- Peter Biyiasas (born 1950), Canadian chess grandmaster
- Péter Dely (1934–2012), Hungarian chess grandmaster
- Peter Enders (1963–2025), German chess grandmaster
- Peter Gvozdják (born 1965), Slovak chess composer
- Peter Iordansky (1891–1937), Russian chess player
- Peter Michael Jamieson (born 1946), Scottish chess player
- Peter Korning (1902–1995), Danish chess player
- Peter Leepin (1920–1995), Swiss chess player
- Peter Leko (born 1979), Hungarian chess grandmaster
- Peter Markland (born 1951), English chess player
- Peter Michalik (born 1990), Slovak chess grandmaster
- Peter Nørby (born 1940), Danish chess player
- Peter Ostermeyer (born 1943), German chess player
- Peter Svidler (born 1976), Russian chess grandmaster

=== Cricket ===
- Peter Aho (born 2003), Nigerian cricketer
- Peter Amm (born 1962), South African cricketer
- Peter Ananya (born 1988), Ghanaian cricketer
- Peter Badham (1911–1983), English cricketer
- Peter Barclay (born 1965), South African cricketer
- Peter Barcroft (1929–1977), English cricketer
- Peter Barrable (1943–2015), South African cricketer
- Peter Bedford (sportsman) (born 1947), Australian rules footballer and cricketer
- Peter Bichener (born 1941), English cricketer
- Peter Birtwisle (born 1946), English cricketer
- Peter Blackbourn (born 1957), New Zealand cricketer
- Peter Blueitt, English blind cricketer
- Peter Bocock (born 1991), New Zealand cricketer
- Peter Bodkin (1924–1994), English cricketer
- Peter Borren (born 1983), Dutch cricketer
- Peter Borrill (born 1951), English cricketer
- Peter Borwick (1913–1983), English cricketer
- Peter Bradbury (cricketer) (born 1950), English cricketer
- Peter Brayshay (1916–2004), English cricketer
- Peter Brinsley, Australian cricketer
- Peter Brodrick (1937–2024), English cricketer
- Peter Broughton (born 1935), English cricketer
- Peter Camm (born 1980), English cricketer
- Peter Cantrell (born 1962), Dutch cricketer
- Peter Capes (born 1962), Australian cricketer and businessman
- Peter Carlstein (1938–2023), South African cricketer
- Peter Chase (born 1993), Irish cricketer
- Peter Cherrington (1917–1945), English cricketer
- Peter Chingoka (1954–2019), Zimbabwean cricket administrator
- Peter Clements (born 1953), Australian cricketer
- Peter Close (1943–2025), English cricketer
- Peter Clough (born 1956), Australian cricketer
- Peter Coman (born 1943), New Zealand cricketer
- Peter Copeland (1933–2020), South African cricketer
- Peter Cottrell (born 1957), English cricketer
- Peter Cousens (cricketer) (1932–2026), South African-born English cricketer
- Peter Coutts (archaeologist) (1937–2015), New Zealand cricketer
- Peter Crane (born 1950), English cricketer
- Peter Cranmer (1914–1994), English cricket and rugby union player
- Peter Cronin (born 1947), Australian cricket umpire
- Peter Crowther (born 1952), Welsh cricketer
- Peter Davy (born 1974), Irish cricketer
- Peter de Souza, Indian-born Ugandan cricketer
- Peter de Vaal (born 1945), South African cricketer
- Peter Delisle (1934–2014), English cricketer
- Peter Dobbs (born 1968), New Zealand cricketer
- Peter Doggart (1927–1965), English cricketer
- Peter Drinnen (born 1967), Australian cricketer
- Peter Drysdale (cricketer) (born 1989), New Zealand cricketer
- Peter Duthie (born 1959), Scottish cricketer
- Peter Eakin (born 1995), Irish cricketer
- Peter Easton (cricketer) (born 1936), Australian cricketer
- Peter Eele (1935–2019), English cricketer
- Peter Emslie (born 1968), South African cricketer
- Peter Enright (1925–2015), Australian cricket umpire
- Peter Eyre (cricketer) (1939–2025), English cricketer
- Peter Faulkner (born 1960), Australian first-class cricketer
- Peter Forman (cricketer) (1934–2022), English cricketer
- Peter Forrest (born 1985), Australian cricketer
- Peter Free (born 1971), English cricketer
- Peter Fulton (born 1979), New Zealand cricketer
- Peter Furstenburg (born 1987), South African cricketer
- Peter Gatehouse (born 1936), Welsh cricketer
- Peter Gibaud (1892–1963), Australian cricketer
- Peter Gillespie (born 1974), Irish cricketer
- Peter Gladigau (born 1965), Australian cricketer
- Peter Goggin (born 1965), Australian cricketer
- Peter Gonnella (born 1963), Australian cricketer
- Peter Gooch (born 1949), English cricketer
- Peter Gough (born 1984), Jersey cricketer
- Peter Gracey (1921–2006), English cricketer and soldier
- Peter Greenwood (footballer) (1924–2021), English footballer and cricketer
- Peter Groves (born 1988), English cricketer
- Peter Handscomb (born 1991), Australian cricketer
- Peter Hearn (1925–2013), English cricketer
- Peter Heger (born 1942), South African cricketer
- Peter Heine (1928–2005), South African cricketer
- Peter Hepworth (born 1967), English cricketer
- Peter Heseltine (born 1965), English cricketer
- Peter Higson (1905–1986), English cricketer
- Peter Hills (born 1958), New Zealand cricketer
- Peter Howden (1911–2003), New Zealand cricketer
- Peter Huxford (born 1960), English cricketer
- Peter Iles (born 1926), New Zealand cricketer
- Peter Ingram (born 1978), New Zealand cricketer
- Peter Ingram (cricketer, born 1869) (1869–1955), Scottish cricketer
- Peter Jaques (1919–2013), English cricketer
- Peter Kelland (1926–2011), English cricketer
- Peter Kingston-Davey (born 1940), English cricket umpire
- Peter Kirsten (born 1955), South African cricketer
- Peter Kituku (born 1988), Kenyan cricketer
- Peter Hans Konig (born 1931), Austrian-born English cricketer
- Peter Laing (born 1984), South African cricketer
- Peter Laker (1926–2014), English cricketer and journalist
- Peter Lamsdale (born 1971), English cricketer
- Peter Lashley (1937–2023), West Indian cricketer
- Peter Ledden (born 1943), English cricketer
- Peter Lindsey (born 1944), English cricketer
- Peter Loader (1929–2011), English cricketer and umpire
- Peter Lunn (cricketer) (born 1970), English cricketer
- Peter Mancell (born 1958), Australian cricketer
- Peter Manuel (umpire) (born 1950), Sri Lankan cricket umpire
- Peter Marner (1936–2007), English cricketer and rugby union footballer
- Peter McAlister (1869–1938), Australian cricketer
- Peter McGiffin, Australian cricket coach
- Peter McGlashan (born 1979), New Zealand cricketer
- Peter McGregor (cricketer) (born 1941), New Zealand cricketer
- Peter McRae (1916–1944), Argentine-born English cricketer
- Peter Moide (born 1974), Papua New Guinean cricketer
- Peter Mucklow (born 1949), English cricketer
- Peter Murray-Willis (1910–1995), English cricketer
- Peter Muzzell (born 1939), South African cricketer
- Peter Neal (born 1961), Scottish cricketer
- Peter Nero (umpire) (born 1964), Trinidad and Tobago cricket umpire
- Peter Neutze (born 1963), New Zealand cricketer
- Peter Nevill (born 1985), Australian cricketer
- Peter Oldfield (1911–2002), English cricketer
- Peter Oldham (1924–2011), English and Rhodesian cricketer
- Peter Ongondo (born 1977), Kenyan cricketer
- Peter Parfitt (born 1936), English cricketer
- Peter Petherick (1942–2015), New Zealand cricketer
- Peter Petricola (born 1983), Italian cricketer
- Peter Philpott (1934–2021), Australian cricketer
- Peter Philpott (Bermudian cricketer) (born 1967), Bermudian cricketer
- Peter Plummer (born 1947), English cricketer
- Peter Pollock (born 1941), South African cricketer
- Peter Pullan (1857–1901), English cricketer
- Peter Ranells (born 1954), English cricketer
- Peter Raspin (born 1951), English cricketer
- Peter Rattray (1958–2021), New Zealand cricketer
- Peter Rawson (born 1957), Zimbabwean cricketer
- Peter Rhind (born 1945), Scottish cricketer
- Peter Ridgway (born 1972), English cricketer
- Peter Rochford (1928–1992), English cricketer
- Peter Roebuck (1956–2011), English cricketer
- Peter Sabine (born 1941), English cricketer
- Peter Sacristani (born 1957), Australian cricketer
- Peter Sainsbury (1934–2014), English cricketer
- Peter Schenscher (born 1962), Australian cricketer
- Peter Semple (born 1941), New Zealand cricketer
- Peter Shenton (1936–1996), English cricketer
- Peter Shuman (1933–1993), South African cricketer
- Peter Siddle (born 1984), Australian cricketer
- Peter Simpkins (1928–2011), English cricketer
- Peter Sincock (born 1948), Australian cricketer
- Peter Skelton (1934–2009), New Zealand cricketer
- Peter Sleep (born 1957), Australian cricketer
- Peter Small (cricketer) (1925–2003), New Zealand cricketer
- Peter Solway (born 1964), Australian cricketer
- Peter Spicer (1939–1969), English cricketer
- Peter Stimpson (born 1947), Welsh cricketer
- Peter Stoddart (1934–2019), English cricketer
- Peter Stopforth (1908–1987), South African cricketer
- Peter Stringer (cricketer) (born 1943), English cricketer
- Peter Stuckey (born 1940), English cricketer
- Peter Such (born 1964), English cricketer
- Peter Sunnucks (1916–1997), English cricketer
- Peter Swanwick (cricketer) (born 1945), English cricketer
- Peter Swart (cricketer) (1946–2000), Rhodesian cricketer
- Peter Tennant (cricketer), English cricketer
- Peter Thackeray (born 1950), English cricketer
- Peter Timmis (1942–1988), English cricketer
- Peter Toohey (born 1954), Australian cricketer
- Peter Topley (born 1950), English cricketer
- Peter Trego (born 1981), English cricketer
- Peter Trend (born 1974), English cricketer
- Peter Truscott (born 1941), New Zealand cricketer
- Peter Verhoek (born 1955), New Zealand cricketer
- Peter Visser (born 1960), New Zealand cricketer
- Peter Wales (1928–2018), English cricketer
- Peter Waterman (cricketer) (born 1961), English cricketer
- Peter Webley (1942–2023), English cricketer
- Peter Wellings (born 1970), English cricketer
- Peter Westerman (1920–1992), English cricketer
- Peter Whitehouse (1917–1943), English cricketer
- Peter Whiteman (cricketer) (born 1944), Trinidadian cricketer
- Peter Willey (born 1949), English cricketer
- Peter Worthington (cricketer) (born 1979), Australian cricketer
- Peter Younghusband (born 1990), New Zealand cricketer

=== Cross-country skiing ===
- Peter Juric (born 1958), Austrian cross-country skier
- Peter Mlynár (born 1988), Slovak cross-country skier
- Peter Radacher (1930–?), Austrian cross-country skier
- Peter Schlickenrieder (born 1970), German cross-country skier
- Peter Strong (born 1946), British cross-country skier
- Peter Thiel (cross-country skier) (born 1943), German cross-country skier
- Peter von Allmen (born 1978), Swiss cross-country skier
- Peter Zipfel (born 1956), West German cross-country skier

=== Curling ===
- Peter Attinger Jr. (born 1951), Swiss curler and coach
- Peter Cederwall (born 1954), Swedish curler
- Peter Corner (born 1968), Canadian curler
- Peter Dahlman (born 1960), Norwegian curler and coach
- Peter Däppen (born 1950), Swiss curler
- Peter de Boer (born 1971), New Zealand curler
- Peter de Cruz (born 1990), Swiss curler
- Peter Eggenschwiler, Swiss curler
- Peter Gallant (born 1958), Canadian curler
- Peter Grendelmeier (born 1967), Swiss curler
- Peter Hnatiw, Canadian curler
- Peter Jacoby, German curler
- Peter Loudon (born 1966), Scottish curler
- Peter Narup (born 1969), Swedish curler
- Peter Nenzén (born 1960), Swedish male curler
- Peter Rickmers (curler) (born 1947), German curler
- Peter Stolt (born 1979), American curler

=== Cycling ===
- Peter Aldridge (born 1961), Jamaican cyclist
- Peter Bazálik (born 1975), Slovak cyclist
- Peter Besanko (born 1955), Australian cyclist
- Peter Boyd (cyclist), English cyclist
- Peter Brotherton (born 1931), British cyclist
- Peter Clausen (cyclist) (born 1964), Danish cyclist
- Peter Crinnion (born 1939), Irish cyclist
- Peter De Clercq (born 1966), Belgian cyclist
- Peter Deimböck (born 1942), Austrian cyclist
- Peter Dibben (born 1991), British cyclist
- Peter Disera (born 1995), Canadian cyclist
- Peter Drobach (1890–1947), American cyclist
- Peter Farazijn (born 1969), Belgian cyclist
- Peter Frischknecht (born 1946), Swiss cyclo-cross cyclist
- Peter Glemser (born 1940), German cyclist
- Peter Gröning (born 1939), East German track cyclist
- Peter Hilse (born 1962), German cyclist
- Peter Hirzel (1939–2017), Swiss cyclist
- Peter Homann (born 1960), Australian Paralympic cyclist
- Peter Hric (1965–2025), Slovak cyclist
- Peter Jacques (cyclist), British cyclist
- Peter Kennaugh (born 1989), British road bicycle racer
- Peter Kesting (born 1955), Australian cyclist
- Peter Koning (born 1990), Dutch cyclist
- Péter Kusztor (born 1984), Hungarian cyclist
- Peter Lenderink (born 1996), Dutch cyclist
- Peter Lombard II (born 1976), Guamanian cyclist
- Peter Longbottom (1959–1998), British racing cyclist
- Peter Luttenberger (born 1972), Austrian cyclist
- Peter Muckenhuber (born 1955), Austrian cyclist
- Peter Nieuwenhuis (born 1951), Dutch cyclist
- Peter Øxenberg (born 2005), Danish cyclist
- Peter Panton (born 1932), Australian racing cyclist
- Peter Pieters (born 1962), Dutch cyclist
- Peter Post (1933–2011), Dutch cyclist
- Peter Pouly (born 1977), French cyclist
- Peter Procter (1930–2024), British cyclist and rally driver
- Peter Pryor (1930–2005), Australian cyclist
- Peter Roes (born 1964), Belgian cyclist
- Peter Ryalls (1938–2017), British cyclist
- Peter Sagan (born 1990), Slovak cyclist
- Peter Schep (born 1977), Dutch cyclist
- Peter Schulting (born 1987), Dutch bicycle racer
- Peter Smessaert (1908–2000), Belgian-born American cyclist
- Peter Steiger (born 1960), Swiss cyclist
- Peter Stetina (born 1987), American racing cyclist
- Peter Stevenhaagen (born 1965), Dutch cyclist
- Peter van Agtmaal (born 1982), Dutch bicycle racer
- Peter Van Den Abeele (born 1966), Belgian cyclist
- Peter van Doorn (born 1946), Dutch cyclist
- Peter Van Petegem (born 1970), Belgian cyclist
- Peter Velits (born 1985), Slovak road bicycle racer
- Peter Verbeken (born 1966), Belgian road cyclist
- Peter Vonhof (born 1949), German cyclist
- Peter Weibel (cyclist) (1950–2017), German cyclist
- Peter Winnen (born 1957), Dutch cyclist
- Peter Wrolich (born 1974), Austrian cyclist
- Peter Zijerveld (born 1955), Dutch cyclist

=== Darts ===
- Peter Evison (born 1964), English darts player
- Peter Jacques (born 1973), English darts player
- Peter Manley (born 1962), English darts player
- Peter Masson (1945–2010), British darts player
- Peter Sajwani (born 1977), Swedish darts player
- Peter Wright (born 1970), Scottish darts player

=== Diving ===
- Peter Avdoulos, American diver
- Peter Beveridge (1899–?), English diver
- Peter Heatly (1924–2015), British diver
- Peter Tarsey (1937–2015), British diver
- Peter Waterfield (born 1981), British diver

=== Equestrian ===
- Peter Breakwell (born 1957), New Zealand equestrian
- Peter Charles (born 1960), Irish-British equestrian
- Peter Ebinger (1958–2015), Austrian equestrian
- Peter Flarup (born 1976), Danish equestrian
- Peter Gmoser (born 1971), Austrian equestrian
- Peter Gotz (born 1955), South African equestrian
- Peter Leone (born 1960), American equestrian
- Peter Luther (1939–2024), German equestrian
- Peter McMahon (equestrian) (born 1981), Australian equestrian
- Peter Robeson (1929–2018), British equestrian
- Peter Storr (born 1965), British dressage rider
- Peter Thomsen (born 1961), German equestrian
- Peter Wylde (born 1965), American equestrian
- Peter Zobel (1936–2017), Danish equestrian

=== Fencing ===
- Peter Åkerberg (born 1960), Swedish fencer
- Peter Askjær-Friis (born 1947), Danish fencer
- Peter Bruder (1908–1976), American fencer
- Peter Falkner, German fencing master
- Peter Grönholm (born 1958), Finnish fencer
- Peter Joos (born 1961), Belgian fencer
- Peter Joppich (born 1982), German fencer
- Peter Lötscher (1941–2017), Swiss fencer
- Peter Macken (born 1938), Australian modern pentathlete and fencer
- Péter Marót (1945–2020), Hungarian fencer
- Peter Mather (born 1953), British fencer
- Peter Ryefelt (1893–1967), Danish fencer
- Peter Schifrin (born 1958), American fencer and sculptor
- Péter Somfai (born 1980), Hungarian fencer
- Peter Ulbrich (born 1955), German fencer
- Péter Vánky (born 1968), Swedish fencer
- Peter von Krockow (1935–2018), German fencer
- Peter Westbrook (1952–2024), American fencer
- Peter Zobl-Wessely (born 1949), Austrian modern pentathlete and fencer

=== Field hockey ===
- Peter Akatsa (1960–2023), Kenyan field hockey player
- Peter Buckland (born 1941), Canadian hockey player
- Peter Caninenberg (born 1956), German hockey player
- Peter Caruth (born 1988), Irish field hockey player
- Peter Daji (born 1960), New Zealand field hockey player
- Peter Dalgado (1930–1986), Kenyan hockey player
- Peter Koefoed (1902–1983), Danish field hockey player
- Peter Lown (born 1947), Canadian field hockey player
- Peter Milkovich (born 1966), Canadian field hockey player
- Peter Miskimmin (born 1958), New Zealand field hockey player
- Peter Motzek (born 1957), Canadian field hockey player
- Peter Noel (born 1963), Australian field hockey player
- Peter Prahm (1908–2003), Danish field hockey player
- Peter Trump (born 1950), German field hockey player
- Peter van Asbeck (born 1954), Dutch field hockey player
- Peter Vander Pyl (1933–2019), Canadian field hockey player
- Peter van Huizen (1932–2011), Malaysian field hockey player
- Peter Windt (born 1973), Dutch field hockey player

=== Figure skating ===
- Peter Bartosiewicz (born 1942), Slovak figure skater
- Peter Betts, American figure skater
- Peter Dalby, British figure skater
- Peter Firstbrook (1933–1985), Canadian figure skating
- Peter Göbel (born 1941), East German figure skater
- Peter Grütter (born 1942), Swiss figure skater and coach
- Peter James Hallam (born 1995), English figure skater
- Peter Handschmann (born 1957), Austrian ice dancer
- Peter Krick (born 1944), German figure skater
- Peter Liebers (born 1988), German figure skater
- Peter Krick (born 1944), German figure skater
- Peter Liebers (born 1988), German figure skater
- Peter Oppegard (born 1959), American pair skater and coach
- Peter Pender (1936–1990), American bridge player and figure skater
- Peter Reitmayer (born 1993), Slovak figure skater
- Peter Tchernyshev (born 1971), Russian-American ice dancer

=== Floorball ===
- Peter Sjögren (born 1983), Swedish floorball player

=== Football ===
- Peter Aase (born 1995), Norwegian footballer
- Peter Abbott (footballer) (born 1953), English footballer
- Peter Abelsson (born 1977), Swedish footballer
- Peter Abimbola (born 2004), English footballer
- Peter Abrahamsson (born 1988), Swedish footballer
- Peter Ademo (born 2003), Nigerian footballer
- Peter Aird (1921–2000), Scottish footballer
- Peter Aitken (born 1954), Welsh footballer
- Peter Aldis (1927–2008), English footballer
- Peter Ambrose (born 2002), Nigerian footballer
- Peter Amoran (born 2004), Swedish association footballer
- Péter Andorka (born 1984), Hungarian footballer
- Peter Angell (1932–1979), English footballer
- Peter Anieke (1946–2015), Nigerian footballer
- Peter Ankersen (born 1990), Danish footballer
- Peter Anosike (born 1976), Nigerian footballer
- Péter Antal (born 1948), Hungarian footballer and manager
- Peter Antoine (1944–2023), German football manager
- Peter Arnautoff (born 1951), American soccer goalkeeper
- Peter Arntz (born 1953), Dutch footballer
- Peter Artner (born 1966), Austrian footballer
- Peter Assion (born 1959), German footballer and manager
- Peter Baah (born 1973), English footballer and manager
- Peter Babnič (born 1977), Slovak footballer
- Péter Bajzát (born 1981), Hungarian footballer
- Péter Balassa (born 1975), Hungarian footballer
- Peter Balette (born 1961), Belgian football coach
- Péter Bali (born 1984), Hungarian footballer
- Peter Banda (born 2000), Malawian footballer
- Peter Bankes, English association football referee
- Péter Baráth (born 2002), Hungarian footballer
- Peter Barfuß (born 1944), German footballer
- Peter Bartalský (born 1978), Slovak footballer
- Peter Barthold (born 1954), Austrian footballer
- Peter Bašista (born 1985), Slovak footballer
- Peter Beadle (born 1972), English footballer and manager
- Peter Beagrie (born 1965), English footballer
- Peter Beardsley (born 1961), English footballer
- Peter Beckers (1947–1996), Scottish footballer
- Peter Benedik (born 1947), Slovak footballer
- Peter Bennie (1899–1981), Scottish footballer
- Peter Bernauer (born 1965), German footballer
- Peter Billing (born 1964), English footballer
- Peter Billingham (1938–2019), English footballer and greyhound trainer
- Peter Binkovski (born 1972), Slovenian footballer
- Peter Bircumshaw (1938–2017), English footballer
- Peter Bjur (born 2000), Danish footballer
- Peter Blazincic (born 1969), Australian soccer player
- Peter Blusch (born 1942), German footballer
- Peter Bodak (born 1961), English footballer
- Peter Boeve (born 1957), Dutch footballer and coach
- Péter Bogáti (born 1991), Hungarian footballer
- Peter Bomm (born 1947), German footballer
- Peter Bonde (born 1958), Danish footballer
- Peter Bonetti (1941–2020), English footballer
- Péter Bonifert (born 1985), Hungarian footballer
- Peter Bore (born 1987), English footballer
- Peter Bosz (born 1963), Dutch association football player and manager
- Péter Bozsik (born 1961), Hungarian football manager
- Peter Brabrook (1937–2016), English footballer
- Peter Brandl (footballer) (born 1988), Austrian footballer
- Peter Brendle (born 1943), Swiss footballer
- Peter Brezovan (born 1979), Slovak footballer
- Peter Buljan (born 1978), Australian footballer
- Peter Bullough (1865–1933), English footballer
- Peter Bulmer (born 1965), English footballer
- Peter Burák (born 1978), Slovak footballer
- Peter Burgstaller (1964–2007), Austrian footballer
- Peter Burridge (1933–2025), English footballer
- Peter Byaruhanga (born 1979), Ugandan footballer
- Peter Canero (born 1981), Scottish footballer
- Peter Caraballo (born 1992), Swiss-born Portuguese footballer
- Peter Cargill (1964–2005), Jamaican footballer
- Peter Carvalho (born 1980), Indian footballer
- Peter Castle (born 1987), English footballer
- Peter Caswell (born 1957), English footballer
- Peter Cavanagh (born 1981), English footballer
- Peter Cawley (born 1965), English footballer
- Peter Černák (born 1976), Slovak football manager
- Peter Cherrie (born 1983), Scottish footballer
- Peter Chippendale (1862–1941), English footballer
- Peter Chiswick (1929–1962), English footballer
- Peter Chitila (born 1971), Zambian footballer
- Peter Chol (born 1994), South Sudanese footballer
- Peter Cholopi (born 1996), Malawian footballer
- Peter Chríbik (born 1999), Slovak footballer
- Peter Christofilakos (born 1981), American football and soccer player
- Peter Cklamovski (born 1978), Australian soccer player and manager
- Peter Coffill (born 1957), English footballer
- Peter Conning (born 1964), English footballer
- Peter Cormack (1946–2024), Scottish footballer and manager
- Peter Cormack (footballer, born 1974), English-born Scottish footballer
- Peter Corr (1923–2001), Irish footballer
- Peter Corthine (1937–2015), English-Singaporean footballer
- Peter Coupar (1866–1944), Scottish footballer
- Peter Cowper (1902–1962), English footballer
- Peter Coyle (born 1963), Irish footballer
- Peter Craigmyle (1894–1979), Scottish greatest football referee
- Peter Creamer (born 1953), English footballer
- Peter Crève (born 1961), Belgian footballer
- Peter Croker (1921–2011), English footballer
- Peter Crouch (born 1981), English footballer
- Peter Cruse (born 1951), English footballer
- Peter Čvirik (born 1979), Slovak footballer
- Péter Czvitkovics (born 1983), Hungarian footballer
- Peter Darke (1953–2021), English footballer
- Peter Davenport (born 1961), English footballer and sports manager
- Peter Dawo (born 1964), Kenyan footballer
- Peter de Roo (born 1970), Dutch footballer and coach
- Peter Degn (born 1977), Danish footballer
- Peter Deißenberger (born 1976), German footballer
- Peter Delorge (born 1980), Belgian footballer
- Peter Deng (born 1993), South Sudanese footballer
- Peter Denyer (footballer) (born 1957), English footballer
- Peter Desmond (1926–1990), Irish footballer
- Peter Dietrich (born 1944), German footballer
- Peter Dinsdale (1938–2004), English footballer and manager
- Péter Disztl (born 1960), Hungarian footballer
- Peter Dobing (born 1938), English footballer
- Peter Docherty (1929–1957), English footballer
- Peter Dolby (1940–2019), English footballer
- Peter Doležaj (born 1981), Slovak footballer
- Peter Donaghy (1898–?), English footballer
- Peter Dougall (1909–1974), Scottish footballer
- Peter Dowds (1871–1895), Scottish footballer
- Peter Downsborough (1943–2019), English footballer
- Peter Drozd (born 1973), Czech footballer
- Peter Ducke (born 1941), German footballer
- Peter Duerden (born 1945), footballer
- Peter Duffield (born 1969), English footballer
- Peter Ďungel (born 1993), Slovak footballer
- Peter Durber (1873–1963), English footballer
- Peter Ďurica (born 1986), Slovak footballer
- Peter Ďuriš (born 1981), Slovak footballer
- Peter Dursun (born 1975), Danish footballer
- Peter Dzúrik (1968–2010), Slovak footballer
- Peter Eastoe (born 1953), English footballer
- Peter Ebimobowei (born 1993), Nigerian footballer
- Peter Eggert (1943–2018), German footballer and manager
- Peter Eich (born 1963), German footballer
- Peter Ellson (1925–2014), English footballer
- Peter Elmander (born 1985), Swedish footballer
- Peter Enckelman (born 1977), Finnish footballer
- Peter Endrulat (born 1954), German footballer
- Peter Engler (born 1936), German footballer
- Peter Etebo (born 1995), Nigerian footballer
- Peter Eustace (born 1944), English footballer
- Peter Fear (born 1973), English footballer
- Peter Feely (born 1950), English footballer
- Peter Feher (born 1974), Danish football manager
- Peter Felicetti, Canadian soccer manager and coach
- Peter Feteris (1952–2011), Dutch footballer
- Peter Fieber (born 1964), Slovak footballer and manager
- Peter Flicker (born 1964), Austrian footballer and manager
- Peter Foakes (1946–2006), English football referee
- Peter Foldgast (born 1979), Danish footballer and coach
- Peter Frain (born 1965), English footballer and manager
- Peter Francombe (born 1963), Welsh footballer
- Peter Fregene (1947–2024), Nigerian footballer
- Peter Fröjdfeldt (born 1963), Swedish football referee
- Peter Frymuth (born 1956), German football official
- Peter Füri (1937–2015), Swiss footballer and manager
- Peter Fuzes (born 1947), Australian soccer player
- Peter Fyhr (born 1969), Swedish footballer
- Peter Gagelmann (born 1968), German football referee
- Peter Gain (born 1976), Irish footballer
- Peter Gál-Andrezly (born 1990), Slovak footballer
- Péter Galaschek (born 1968), Hungarian footballer
- Peter Gans (born 1937), Dutch football referee
- Peter Gartland (1893–1973), English footballer
- Peter Gastis (born 1971), Canadian soccer player
- Peter Gavigan (1897–1977), Scottish footballer
- Peter Gelson (1941–2021), English footballer
- Peter Gergely (born 1964), Slovak footballer
- Peter Gerhardsson (born 1959), Swedish footballer and manager
- Peter Germain (born 1982), Haitian footballer
- Peter Gerrard (born 1942), New Zealand footballer
- Peter Geyer (born 1952), German footballer
- Peter Gildea (1883–1940), Scottish footballer
- Peter Gilfillan (born 1965), Canadian soccer player
- Peter Gillott (1935–2021), English footballer
- Peter Gleasure (born 1960), English footballer
- Peter Gmür (born 1967), Swiss footballer
- Peter González (footballer) (born 2002), Dominican Republic footballer
- Peter Goring (1927–1994), English footballer and manager
- Peter Gowans (1944–2009), Scottish footballer
- Peter Goy (1938–2021), English footballer
- Peter Grajciar (born 1983), Slovak footballer
- Peter Graulund (born 1976), Danish footballer
- Peter Gravesen (born 1979), Danish footballer
- Peter Greco (born 1946), Canadian soccer player
- Peter Greenwood (footballer) (1924–2021), English footballer and cricketer
- Peter Grosser (1938–2021), German footballer and coach
- Peter Grotier (born 1950), English footballer
- Peter Grummitt (born 1942), English footballer
- Peter Grünberger (1962–2021), German footballer
- Peter Guggi (born 1967), Austrian footballer
- Peter Guinari (born 2001), Central African Republic footballer
- Péter Gulácsi (born 1990), Hungarian footballer
- Peter Gunby (1934–2022), English footballer and manager
- Peter Gunda (born 1973), Slovak footballer
- Peter Gwargis (born 2000), Iraqi footballer
- Peter Hackenberg (born 1989), German footballer
- Peter Hackmair (born 1987), Austrian footballer
- Peter Haddock (born 1961), English footballer
- Peter Haggerty (born 1937), Scottish footballer
- Péter Halmosi (born 1979), Hungarian footballer
- Peter Hampton (1954–2020), English footballer
- Peter Handyside (1974–2024), Scottish footballer
- Péter Hannich (born 1957), Hungarian footballer
- Peter Hanrahan (born 1968), Irish footballer
- Peter Harburn (1931–2010), English footballer and manager
- Peter Haring (born 1993), Austrian footballer
- Peter Henkes (born 1962), German footballer
- Peter Herda (born 1956), Slovak footballer
- Peter Heritage (born 1960), English footballer
- Peter Hertz (footballer) (born 1954), Danish footballer
- Peter Hetherston (born 1964), Scottish footballer and manager
- Peter Hewabettage (born 1991), Sri Lankan footballer
- Peter Hidien (born 1953), German footballer
- Peter Higham (born 1930, English footballer
- Peter Hillgren (born 1966), Swedish footballer
- Peter Hindley (1944–2021), English footballer
- Peter Hinds (born 1962), Barbadian footballer
- Peter Hlinka (born 1978), Slovak footballer
- Peter Hluško (born 1970), Slovak footballer
- Peter Hodge (1871–1934), Scottish football manager
- Peter Hodulík (born 1981), Slovak footballer
- Peter Hoekstra (footballer) (born 1973), Dutch footballer
- Peter Hoferica (born 1983), Slovak footballer
- Peter Hofstede (born 1967), Dutch footballer
- Péter Horváth (footballer), Hungarian footballer
- Peter Houghton (footballer) (born 1954), English footballer
- Peter Houseman (1945–1977), English footballer
- Peter Houston (born 1958), Scottish footballer and manager
- Peter Houtman (born 1957), Dutch footballer
- Peter Howey (born 1958), English footballer
- Peter Hricko (born 1981), Slovak footballer
- Peter Hrstic (born 1961), Austrian footballer
- Peter Hucker (born 1959), English footballer
- Peter Hyballa (born 1975), German football manager
- Peter Ijeh (born 1977), Nigerian footballer
- Peter Isaac (born 1931), English footballer
- Peter Isaacs (born 1968), Jamaican footballer
- Peter Itodo (born 2003), Nigerian footballer
- Peter Jackisch (born 1963), German footballer
- Peter Jameson (born 1993), English footballer
- Peter Jánošík (born 1988), Slovak footballer
- Peter Jehle (born 1982), Liechtensteiner footballer
- Peter Jianette (born 1963), American soccer player
- Peter Jungschläger (born 1984), Dutch footballer
- Peter Kaack (born 1943), German footballer
- Péter Kabát (born 1977), Hungarian footballer
- Peter Kalinke (1936–2020), German footballer
- Peter Katholos (born 1961), Australian soccer player
- Peter Katona (born 1988), Slovak footballer
- Peter Kaumba (born 1958), Zambian footballer and coach
- Peter Kavka (born 1990), Slovak footballer
- Peter Kaye (born 1979), English forward
- Peter Kearns (1937–2014), English footballer
- Peter Keely (1922–2004), Irish footballer
- Peter Kekeris (born 1999), Australian soccer player
- Peter Kemper (1942–2020), Dutch footballer
- Peter Khalife (born 1990), Lebanese-Swedish football agent, manager and player
- Péter Kincses (born 1980), Hungarian footballer
- Peter Kioso (born 1999), DR Congolese footballer
- Peter Kirkham (born 1974), English footballer
- Peter Kiška (born 1981), Slovak footballer
- Peter Kitchen (born 1952), English footballer
- Peter Klančar (born 1985), Slovenian footballer
- Peter Klaunzer (born 1967), Liechtenstein footballer
- Peter Kleščík (born 1988), Slovak footballer
- Peter Knäbel (born 1966), German footballer
- Peter Knowles (born 1945), English footballer
- Peter Kobel (born 1969), Swiss footballer
- Peter Kolawole (born 1990), Nigerian footballer
- Peter Kolesár (born 1998), Slovak footballer
- Peter Koncilia (born 1949), Austrian footballer
- Peter Kopteff (born 1979), Finnish footballer
- Peter Kostolanský (born 1985), Slovak footballer
- Peter Kotte (born 1954), German footballer
- Peter Kováčik (born 2001), Slovak professional footballer
- Peter Közle (born 1967), German footballer
- Peter Kracke (1943–1993), German footballer
- Peter Kumančík (born 1985), Slovak footballer
- Peter Kunkel (born 1956), German footballer
- Peter Kunter (1941–2024), German footballer
- Peter Kupferschmidt (1942–2025), German footballer
- Peter Kuračka (born 1978), Slovak footballer
- Peter Kursinski (born 1956), German footballer
- Péter Kurucz (born 1988), Hungarian footballer
- Peter Kurzweg (born 1994), German footballer
- Peter Lak (1973–2024), American soccer player
- Peter Lamptey (1946–2025), Ghanaian footballer
- Peter Langhoff (born 2004), Danish footballer
- Peter Laraman (1940–2020), English footballer
- Peter Lassen (footballer) (born 1966), Danish footballer
- Peter Latchford (born 1952), English footballer
- Peter Laverick (1939–2013), English footballer
- Peter Leebrook (born 1968), English footballer
- Peter Leeuwenburgh (born 1994), Dutch footballer
- Peter Leggett (1943–2016), English footballer
- Peter Leigh (1939–2024), English footballer
- Peter Leitl (born 1948), Austrian footballer and manager
- Péter Lendvai (born 1975), Hungarian footballer
- Peter Lindau (born 1972), Swedish footballer and manager
- Péter Lipcsei (born 1972), Hungarian footballer and manager
- Peter Lipták (born 1989), Slovak soccer player
- Peter Litchfield (born 1956), English footballer
- Peter Lönn (born 1961), Swedish footballer
- Peter Lorimer (1946–2021), Scottish footballer
- Peter Løvenkrands (born 1980), Danish footballer
- Peter Lübeke (1952–2022), German footballer
- Peter Luccin (born 1979), French footballer
- Peter Lundberg (born 1981), Finnish footballer and manager
- Peter Lupčo (born 1995), Slovak footballer
- Peter Lux (born 1962), German footballer
- Peter Luzak (born 1978), American soccer player
- Peter Mackin (1878–1917), English footballer
- Peter Maes (born 1964), Belgian football manager
- Peter Magnusson (footballer) (born 1984), Swedish footballer
- Peter Maguire (born 1969), English footballer
- Peter Majerník (born 1978), Slovak footballer
- Peter Maker (born 1994), South Sudanese footballer
- Peter Makrillos (born 1995), Austrian soccer player
- Peter Mannos (born 1954), American soccer player
- Peter Marinello (born 1950), Scottish footballer
- Peter Markstedt (born 1972), Swedish footballer and manager
- Peter Marti (1952–2023), Swiss footballer
- Peter Maslo (born 1987), Slovak footballer
- Peter Mast (born 1957), Swiss footballer
- Peter Matshitse (born 1971), South African soccer player
- Peter Mauchan (1882–1943), Spanish footballer
- Peter Mazan (born 1990), Slovak footballer
- Peter McCloy (born 1946), Scottish footballer
- Peter McGlynn (born 1989), Irish footballer
- Peter McGonagle (1905–1956), Scottish footballer
- Peter McKennan (1918–1991), Scottish footballer
- Peter McKinney (1897–1979), English footballer
- Peter McParland (1934–2025), Northern Irish footballer
- Peter McQuade (born 1948), Scottish footballer
- Peter McWilliam (1879–1951), Scottish footballer
- Peter Meister (born 1954), Austrian footballer
- Peter Mellor (born 1947), British-born American soccer player and coach
- Peter Méndez (born 1964), Uruguayan footballer
- Peter Mendham (born 1960), English footballer
- Peter Mercado (born 1981), Ecuadorian footballer
- Peter Mesesnel (born 1971), Slovenian footballer
- Peter Mgangira (born 1980), Malawian footballer
- Peter Michorl (born 1995), Austrian footballer
- Peter Mičic (born 1986), Slovak footballer
- Péter Mihalecz (born 1979), Hungarian footballer
- Peter Møller (born 1972), Danish footballer and sports journalist
- Peter Mollez (born 1983), Belgian footballer
- Peter Momber (1921–1975), German footballer
- Peter Monaghan (1917–1945), Scottish footballer
- Peter Moodie (1892–1947), Scottish footballer
- Peter Mörk (born 1969), Swedish footballer
- Peter Moyo (born 1988), Zimbabwean footballer
- Peter Mponda (born 1981), Malawian footballer
- Peter Muduhwa (born 1993), Zimbabwean footballer
- Peter Mumby (born 1969), English footballer
- Peter Murko (born 1984), Slovenian footballer
- Peter Mutkovič (1945–2023), Slovak footballer
- Peter Nadig (born 1965), Swiss footballer
- Peter Ndlovu (born 1973), Zimbabwean footballer and manager
- Peter Neale (1934–2022), English footballer
- Peter Neil, Scottish footballer
- Peter Nellies (1886–130), Scottish footballer and manager
- Peter Németh (born 1972), Slovak footballer
- Peter Neururer (born 1955), German football manager
- Peter Neustädter (born 1966), Kazakhstani-German footballer
- Peter Newlove (born 1947), English footballer
- Peter Nieketien (born 1968), Nigerian footballer
- Peter Niemeyer (born 1983), German footballer
- Peter Nix (born 1958), English footballer
- Peter Nogly (born 1947), German footballer
- Peter Notaro (born 1957), American soccer player
- Peter Nover (born 1949), German footballer
- Peter Nworah (born 1990), Nigerian footballer
- Peter Nymann (born 1982), Danish footballer
- Peter Nyström (born 1984), Swedish footballer
- Peter Odemwingie (born 1981), Nigerian footballer
- Peter O'Dowd (1908–1964), English footballer
- Peter Ofori-Quaye (born 1980), Ghanaian footballer
- Peter Ogaba (1974–2016), Nigerian footballer
- Peter Taiye Oladotun (born 1985), Nigerian footballer
- Peter Olawale (born 2002), Nigerian footballer
- Peter Olayinka (born 1995), Nigerian footballer
- Peter Ollerton (born 1951), English-born Australian soccer player
- Peter Olofsson (footballer) (born 1975), Swedish footballer
- Peter Omoduemuke (born 1984), Nigerian footballer
- Peter Opiyo (born 1992), Kenyan footballer
- Peter Orávik (born 1988), Slovak footballer
- Péter Orosz (born 1981), Hungarian footballer
- Peter Osgood (1947–2006), English footballer
- Peter Osterhoff (born 1937), German footballer
- Peter Ouaneh (born 1998), Congolese-born French footballer
- Peter Pacult (born 1959), Austrian footballer
- Peter Pagel (1956–2010), German footballer
- Péter Palotás (1929–1967), Hungarian footballer
- Peter Palúch (born 1958), Slovak footballer
- Peter Passey (born 1952), English footballer
- Peter Pawlett (born 1991), footballer
- Péter Pázmándy (1938–2012), Hungarian footballer and coach
- Peter Peel (soccer coach) (c. 1866–1960), American soccer player and promoter
- Peter Pekarík (born 1986), Slovak footballer
- Peter Perchtold (born 1984), German footballer
- Peter Persidis (1947–2009), Austrian footballer
- Peter Peschel (born 1972), German footballer
- Peter Petrán (born 1981), Slovak footballer
- Peter Petráš (born 1979), Slovak soccer player
- Peter Phanthavong (born 2006), Laotian footballer
- Peter Philipakos (born 1983), American soccer player
- Peter Phoenix (1936–2020), English footballer
- Peter Phyll (born 1974), Montserratian footballer
- Peter Pickering (1926–2006), English footballer
- Peter Pietras (1908–1993), American soccer player
- Peter Pinizzotto, Italian-born Canadian soccer coach
- Peter Platt (footballer)
- Peter Platzer (1910–1959), Austrian footballer
- Peter Polgár (born 1976), Slovak footballer
- Peter Pöllhuber (born 1985), Austrian footballer
- Péter Pölöskei (born 1988), Hungarian footballer
- Peter Popely (1943–2024), English footballer
- Peter Prosper (born 1969), Trinidadian footballer
- Peter Proudfoot (1879–1941), Scottish footballer and manager
- Peter Pucker (born 1988), Austrian footballer
- Peter Pullicino (born 1976), Maltese footballer
- Peter Pumm (born 1943), Austrian footballer
- Peter Purden, Scottish footballer
- Peter Pursell (1894–1968), Scottish footballer
- Peter Quallo (born 1971), German footballer
- Peter Rafferty (born 1948), Northern Irish footballer
- Peter Rajah (1951–2014), Malaysian footballer
- Péter Rajczi (born 1981), Hungarian footballer
- Peter Ramage (footballer, born 1908) (1908–1982), Scottish footballer
- Peter Ramage (born 1983), English football coach and player
- Peter Ramseier (1944–2018), Swiss footballer
- Peter Ranasinghe (c. 1933–2022), Sri Lankan footballer
- Peter Raskopoulos (born 1962), Australian soccer player
- Peter Ratican (1887–1922), American soccer player
- Peter Ravai (born 2003), Scottish footballer
- Peter Reekers (born 1981), Dutch footballer
- Peter Reichel (born 1951), German footballer
- Peter Reichert (born 1961), German footballer
- Peter Remmert (born 2005), German footballer
- Peter Rengel (born 1987), Slovak footballer
- Peter Renzulli (1895–1980), American soccer player
- Peter Ressel (born 1945), Dutch footballer
- Peter Rhoades-Brown (born 1962), English footballer
- Peter Riesterer (1892–1979), Swiss footballer
- Peter Risi (1950–2010), Swiss footballer
- Peter Rodon (1945–2000), Welsh footballer
- Peter Rodrigues (born 1944), Welsh footballer
- Peter Ronald (1889–1953), English footballer
- Peter Ronan, Scottish footballer
- Peter Roney (1886–1930), Scottish footballer
- Peter Rösch (1930–2006), Swiss footballer
- Peter Rubeck (born 1961), German footballer
- Peter Rudbæk (born 1955), Danish football manager
- Peter Rufai (1963–2025), Nigerian footballer
- Peter Rutley (born 1946), English footballer
- Peter Sampil (born 1974), French footballer
- Peter Sampson (1927–2009), English footballer
- Peter Samuelsson (born 1981), Swedish footballer
- Peter Sandoval (1947–2020), Guatemalan footballer
- Peter Sarantopoulos (born 1968), Canadian soccer player
- Peter Sayer (born 1955), Welsh footballer
- Peter Scarff (1908–1933), Scottish footballer
- Peter Schaale (born 1996), German footballer
- Peter Schepull (born 1964), Swiss footballer
- Peter Schmeichel (born 1963), Danish footballer
- Peter Schnittger (born 1941), German football coach
- Péter Schumann (1954–2024), Hungarian footballer
- Peter Schwarz (born 1953), German footballer
- Peter Schyrba (born 1980), German footballer
- Peter Šedivý (born 1983), Slovak footballer
- Peter Sendscheid (born 1965), German footballer
- Peter Sermanni (born 1971), Scottish footballer
- Peter Serry (1973–2009), Kenyan footballer
- Peter Shalulile (born 1993), Namibian footballer
- Peter Sharne (born 1956), Australian soccer player
- Peter Shearer (born 1967), English footballer
- Peter Shearing (born 1938), English footballer
- Peter Shevlin (1902–1948), Scottish footballer
- Peter Shilton (born 1949), English footballer
- Peter Shirtliff (born 1961), English footballer
- Peter Shreeves (born 1940), Welsh footballer, manager and coach
- Peter Sillett (1933–1998), English footballer
- Péter Simek (born 1980), Hungarian footballer
- Peter Simonini (born 1957), American soccer player-coach
- Peter Simonsen (born 1959), New Zealand footballer
- Peter Šinglár (born 1979), Slovak footballer
- Peter Sippel (born 1969), German football referee
- Peter Sirch (born 1961), German footballer
- Peter Skapetis (born 1995), Australian soccer player
- Peter Skipper (1958–2019), English footballer
- Peter Skoog (born 1965), Swedish footballer
- Peter Skouras (born 1963), Greek-American soccer player and coach
- Peter Skov-Jensen (born 1971), Danish footballer
- Peter Sládek (born 1989), Slovak footballer
- Peter Smethurst (born 1940), South African soccer player
- Peter Solnička (born 1982), Slovak footballer
- Peter Somers (1878–1914), Scottish footballer
- Peter Southey (1962–1983), English footballer
- Peter Spiring (born 1950), English footballer
- Peter Spooner (1910–1987), English footballer
- Peter Springett (1946–1997), English footballer
- Peter Sprung (born 1979), German footballer
- Peter Štepanovský (born 1988), Slovak footballer
- Peter Stöger (born 1966), Austrian football coach
- Peter Stojanović (born 1990), Slovenian footballer
- Peter Storey (born 1945), English footballer
- Peter Stringfellow (footballer) (born 1939), English footballer
- Peter Strömberg (born 1956), Swedish footballer
- Peter Stronach (born 1956), English footballer
- Peter Stroud (soccer) (born 2002), American soccer player
- Peter Struhár (born 1984), Slovak footballer
- Peter Štyvar (born 1980), Slovak footballer
- Peter Suddaby (born 1947), English footballer
- Peter Šulek (born 1988), Slovak footballer
- Peter Suswam (born 1991), Nigerian footballer
- Peter Swärdh (born 1965), Swedish footballer and manager
- Peter Henry Sweeney (born 1984), Scottish footballer
- Peter Sweeney (footballer, fl. 1916–1929), Scottish-American soccer player
- Peter Sykora (footballer) (born 1946), East German association footballer
- Péter Szabó (1899–1963), Hungarian footballer and manager
- Péter Szakály (born 1986), Hungarian footballer
- Péter Szappanos (born 1990), Hungarian footballer
- Péter Szilvási (born 1994), Hungarian footballer
- Péter Tereánszki-Tóth (1980–2020), Hungarian footballer
- Peter Thangaraj (1935–2008), Indian footballer
- Peter Therkildsen (born 1998), Danish footballer
- Peter Till (born 1985), English footballer
- Peter Tilley (1930–2008), Northern Irish footballer
- Peter Tomko (born 1984), Slovak footballer
- Péter Törőcsik (born 2001), Hungarian footballer
- Péter Török (1951–1987), Hungarian footballer
- Peter Trainor (1915–1979), English footballer
- Peter Tredinnick (born 1960), Australian soccer player
- Peter Triantis (born 1992), Australian soccer player
- Peter Tschernegg (born 1992), Austrian footballer
- Peter Tsekenis (born 1973), Australian soccer player
- Peter Turbitt (born 1951), English footballer
- Peter Uneken (born 1972), Dutch football manager
- Péter Urbin (born 1984), Hungarian footballer
- Peter Urminský (born 1999), Slovak footballer
- Peter Utaka (born 1984), Nigerian footballer
- Peter Vagenas (born 1978), American soccer player
- Peter Valentine (born 1963), English footballer
- Peter Valla (born 1990), Slovak footballer
- Peter van de Merwe (1942–2016), Dutch footballer
- Peter van de Ven (born 1961), Dutch footballer
- Peter Van der Heyden (born 1976), Belgian footballer
- Peter van der Vlag (born 1977), Dutch footballer and coach
- Peter Van Houdt (born 1976), Belgian footballer
- Peter van Ooijen (born 1992), Dutch footballer
- Peter van Velzen (born 1958), Dutch footballer and manager
- Peter van Vossen (born 1968), Dutch footballer
- Peter Van Wambeke (born 1963), Belgian footballer
- Péter Varga (born 1998), Slovak footballer
- Péter Várhidi (born 1958), Hungarian footballer
- Peter Vaško (born 1987), Slovak footballer
- Peter Vasper (born 1945), English footballer
- Peter Velappan (1935–2018), Malaysian association football administrator
- Peter Velhorn (1932–2016), German footballer and manager
- Péter Vépi (born 1949), Hungarian footballer
- Peter Vera (born 1982), Uruguayan footballer
- Peter Vermes (born 1966), American soccer player and coach
- Peter Vincenti (born 1986), Jèrriais footballer
- Peter Vindahl (born 1998), Danish footballer
- Peter Voets (born 1968), Belgian footballer
- Peter Vollmann (born 1957), German footballer and manager
- Péter Vörös (born 1977), Hungarian footballer
- Peter Voško (born 2000), Slovak footballer
- Peter Vougt (born 1974), Swedish footballer
- Peter Wadabwa (born 1983), Malawian footballer
- Peter Wakeham (1936–2013), English footballer
- Peter Walters (footballer) (born 1952), English footballer
- Peter Warmington (born 1934), English footballer
- Peter Waweru (born 1982), Kenyan soccer referee
- Peter Weatherson (born 1980), English footballer
- Peter Wenger (1944–2016), Swiss footballer
- Peter Werni (born 1974), Norwegian footballer
- Peter Wesselink (born 1968), Dutch footballer and manager
- Peter Westberg (born 1995), Swedish footballer
- Peter Westman (born 1972), Swedish footballer
- Peter Wettergren (born 1968), Swedish footballer and manager
- Peter Whiston (born 1968), English footballer
- Peter Whittingham (1984–2020), English footballer
- Peter Whyke (born 1939), English footballer
- Peter Wibrån (born 1969), Swedish footballer
- Peter Wilding (born 1968), English footballer
- Peter Winn (footballer) (born 1988), English footballer
- Peter Wisgerhof (born 1979), Dutch footballer
- Peter Withe (born 1951), English footballer
- Peter Woodring (born 1968), American soccer player and coach
- Peter Woods (footballer) (born 1950), English footballer
- Peter Wragg (1931–2004), English footballer
- Peter Wurz (born 1967), Austrian footballer
- Peter Wynhoff (born 1968), German footballer and coach
- Péter Zachán (born 1997), Hungarian footballer
- Peter Zanter (born 1965), German footballer
- Peter Zaratin, American soccer player and sports executive
- Peter Zeidler (born 1962), German football manager
- Peter Zeiler (born 1970), German footballer
- Peter Zelem (born 1962), English footballer
- Peter Zelenský (born 1958), Slovak footballer and manager
- Peter Zoïs (born 1978), Australian football manager
- Peter Žulj (born 1993), Austrian footballer

=== Gaelic games ===
- Peter Acheson (born 1990), Irish Gaelic football player
- Peter Canavan (born 1971), Irish Gaelic football player and manager
- Peter Creedon, Gaelic football manager
- Peter Cregan (1918–2004), Irish hurler
- Peter Darby (1938–2022), Irish Gaelic footballer and hurler
- Peter Duggan (born 1993), Irish hurler
- Peter Doolan (born 1940), Irish hurler
- Peter Geraghty (born 1993), Irish hurler
- Peter Harte (born 1990), Irish Gaelic footballer
- Peter Healion (born 1983), Irish hurler
- Peter Huban (born 1976), Irish hurler
- Peter McGee (active 2010s), Gaelic footballer
- Peter McGinley (born 1973/74), Irish Gaelic footballer
- Peter McGinnity (born 1953), Irish Gaelic footballer and manager
- Peter McGrane, Armagh Gaelic footballer
- Peter O'Grady (1903–1980), Irish hurler
- Peter Stevenson, Derry Gaelic footballer
- Peter Synnott (1903–?), Irish Gaelic footballer
- Peter Witherow (born 1987), Irish Gaelic footballer

=== Golf ===
- Peter Alliss (1931–2020), English golfer and broadcaster
- Peter Carsbo (born 1959), Swedish professional golfer
- Peter Fernie (1862–1942), Scottish golfer
- Peter Fowler (born 1959), Australian golfer
- Peter Gustafsson (born 1976), Swedish professional golfer
- Peter Hanson (born 1977), Swedish professional golfer
- Peter Hedblom (born 1970), Swedish professional golfer
- Peter Jacobsen (born 1954), American professional golfer
- Peter Karmis (born 1981), South African professional golfer
- Peter Kostis (born 1946), American golf analyst and instructor
- Peter Lawrie (born 1974), Irish professional golfer
- Peter Lonard (born 1967), Australian professional golfer
- Peter Malmgren (born 1971), Swedish professional golfer
- Peter Malnati (born 1987), American professional golfer
- Peter McEwan Sr. (1834–1895), Scottish golfer and club maker
- Peter McWhinney (born 1956), Australian professional golfer
- Peter Paxton (1857–1929), Scottish golfer
- Peter Persons (born 1962), American golfer
- Peter Senior (born 1959), Australian professional golfer
- Peter Teravainen (born 1956), American professional golfer
- Peter Tomasulo (born 1981), American golfer
- Peter Toogood (1930–2019), Australian amateur golfer
- Peter Tupling (born 1950), English professional golfer
- Peter Uihlein (born 1989), American professional golfer
- Peter Whiteford (born 1980), Scottish professional golfer
- Peter Wilcock (born 1945), English golfer

=== Gymnastics ===
- Peter Buravytskiy (born 2001), British trampoline gymnast
- Peter Kormann (born 1955), American artistic gymnast
- Peter Møller (gymnast) (1891–1972), Danish gymnast
- Peter Rohner (born 1949), Swiss gymnast
- Péter Sós (born 1938), Hungarian gymnast
- Peter Starling (1925–1984), British gymnast
- Peter Šumi (1895–1981), Yugoslav gymnast
- Peter Vidmar (born 1961), American gymnast

=== Handball ===
- Peter Balling (born 1990), Danish handball player
- Peter Bredsdorff-Larsen (born 1967), Danish handball coach
- Peter Bucher (1947–2019), West German handball player
- Péter Fecsi (1905–?), Romanian handball player
- Peter Gentzel (born 1968), Swedish handball player
- Péter Gulyás (born 1984), Hungarian handball player
- Peter Henriksen (born 1972), Danish handball player
- Péter Hornyák (born 1995), Hungarian handball player
- Peter Hürlimann (born 1958), Swiss handball player
- Peter Henriksen (born 1972), Danish handball player
- Peter Jehle (handballer) (born 1957), Swiss handball player
- Peter Johannesson (born 1992), Swedish handball player
- Peter Kakaščík (born 1963), Slovak handball player
- Peter Kalafut (born 1960), Slovak handball player
- Peter Kleibrink (born 1951), German handball player
- Peter Larisch (born 1950), German handball player
- Peter Lash (born 1959), American handball player
- Peter Maag (handballer) (born 1953), Swiss handball player
- Peter Mahne (born 1959), Slovenian handball player
- Peter Mesiarik (born 1963), Slovak handball player
- Peter Mühlematter (born 1945), Swiss handball administrator
- Peter Nørklit (born 1971), Danish handball player
- Peter Olofsson (born 1957), Swedish handball player
- Peter Pospíšil (1944–2006), Czechoslovak handball player
- Peter Pysall (born 1960), German handball player
- Peter Randt (born 1941), German handball player
- Peter Svensson (handballer) (born 1983), Danish handball player

=== Horse racing ===
- Peter Easterby (1929–2025), British racehorse trainer
- Peter Gilpin, Irish racehorse trainer
- Peter Hedger (c. 1940–2022), British racehorse trainer
- Peter Niven (born 1964), Scottish jockey
- Peter Schiergen (born 1965), German jockey and racehorse trainer
- Peter Scudamore (born 1958), British champion jockey
- Peter Vela, New Zealand racehorse breeder
- Peter Walwyn (1933–2017), British horse trainer
- Peter Wolfenden (1935–2023), New Zealand harness racer

=== Ice hockey ===
- Peter Aeschlimann (born 1946), Swiss ice hockey player
- Peter Ahola (born 1968), Finnish ice hockey player
- Peter Almásy (born 1961), French ice hockey player
- Peter Ambroziak (born 1971), Canadian ice hockey player, coach, and executive
- Peter Ascherl (1953–2022), German-Canadian ice hockey player
- Peter Åslin (1962–2012), Swedish ice hockey player
- Peter Aubry (born 1977), Canadian ice hockey player
- Peter Bakovic (born 1965), Canadian ice hockey player
- Peter Barinka (born 1977), Slovak ice hockey player
- Peter Bartoš (born 1973), Slovak ice hockey player
- Peter Belisle, American ice hockey coach
- Peter Berndtsson (born 1965), Swedish ice hockey centre
- Peter Bessone (1913–1989), American ice hockey player
- Péter Bikár (born 1945), Hungarian ice hockey player
- Peter Bohunický (born 1979), Slovak ice hockey forward
- Peter Boltun (born 1993), Slovak ice hockey forward
- Peter Bondra (born 1968), Slovak ice hockey player
- Peter Budaj (born 1982), Slovak ice hockey player
- Peter Casparsson (born 1975), Swedish ice hockey player and coach
- Peter Cehlárik (born 1995), Slovak ice hockey player
- Peter Čerešňák (born 1993), Slovak ice hockey player
- Peter Ciavaglia (born 1969), American ice hockey player
- Peter DeBoer (born 1968), Canadian ice hockey player and coach
- Peter Dineen (born 1960), Canadian-born American ice hockey player
- Peter Douris (born 1966), Canadian ice hockey player
- Peter Draisaitl (born 1965), Czech-born German ice hockey player and coach
- Peter Driscoll (born 1954), Canadian ice hockey player
- Peter Esdale, Canadian ice hockey coach
- Peter Fabuš (born 1979), Slovak ice hockey player
- Peter Ferraro (born 1973), American ice hockey player
- Peter Fiorentino (born 1968), Canadian ice hockey player
- Peter Flache (born 1982), Canadian professional ice hockey player
- Peter Folco (born 1953), Canadian ice hockey player
- Peter Forsberg (born 1973), Swedish ice hockey player
- Peter Frühauf (born 1982), Slovak ice hockey player
- Peter Galamboš (born 1989), Slovak ice hockey player
- Peter Geronazzo (born 1971), Canadian ice hockey player
- Peter Gradin (born 1958), Swedish ice hockey player
- Peter Gustavsson (1958–2023), Swedish ice hockey player
- Peter Hagström (born 1967), Swedish ice hockey player
- Peter Hamerlík (born 1982), Slovak ice hockey player
- Peter Hammarström (born 1969), Swedish ice hockey player and coach
- Peter Harrold (born 1983), American ice hockey player
- Peter Helander (born 1951), Swedish ice hockey player
- Peter Hochkofler (born 1994), Italian ice hockey player
- Peter Högardh (born 1976), Swedish ice hockey player
- Peter Holecko (born 1982), Slovak ice hockey player
- Peter Horachek (born 1960), Canadian ice hockey player and coach
- Peter Hraško (born 1991), Slovak ice hockey player
- Peter Huba (born 1986), Slovak ice hockey player
- Peter Húževka (born 1976), Slovak ice hockey player
- Peter Ihnačák (born 1957), Slovak hockey player
- Peter Ing (born 1969), Canadian ice hockey player
- Peter Jánský (born 1985), Czech ice hockey player
- Peter Junas (born 1968), Slovak ice hockey player
- Peter Kasowski (born 1969), Canadian ice hockey player
- Peter Klemenc (born 1956), Yugoslav ice hockey player
- Peter Klepáč (born 1975), Slovak ice hockey player
- Peter Klouda (born 1978), Slovak ice hockey player
- Peter Kocák (born 1982), Slovak ice hockey player
- Péter Krempels (1897–1978), Hungarian ice hockey player
- Peter Lappin (born 1965), American ice hockey player
- Peter Laviolette (born 1964), American ice hockey player and coach
- Peter Lax (ice hockey) (born 1941), German ice hockey player
- Peter LeBlanc (ice hockey) (born 1988), Canadian ice hockey player
- Peter Leboutillier (born 1975), Canadian ice hockey player
- Peter Lenes (born 1986), American ice hockey player
- Peter Lindmark (born 1956), Swedish ice hockey player
- Peter Loob (born 1957), Swedish ice hockey player
- Peter Lorentzen (born 1983), Norwegian ice hockey player
- Peter Madach (born 1963), Swedish ice hockey player
- Peter Mannino (born 1984), American ice hockey player
- Peter Mara (born 1947), Canadian ice hockey player
- Peter Marrin (born 1953), Canadian ice hockey player
- Peter McDuffe (born 1948), Canadian ice hockey player
- Peter McNab (1952–2022), Canadian-born American ice hockey player
- Peter Metcalf (born 1979), American ice hockey player
- Peter Mikuš (born 1985), Slovak ice hockey player
- Peter Nolander (born 1981), Swedish ice hockey player
- Peter Nordström (born 1974), Swedish ice hockey player
- Peter Novajovský (born 1989), Slovak ice hockey player
- Peter Nylander (born 1976), Swedish professional ice hockey forward
- Peter Obresa (born 1960), German ice hockey player
- Peter Ölvecký (born 1985), Slovak ice hockey player
- Peter Ordzovenský (born 1985), Slovak ice hockey defenseman
- Peter Ország (born 1969), Slovak ice hockey player
- Peter Ottosson (born 1965), Swedish ice hockey player
- Peter Podhradský (born 1979), Slovak ice hockey player
- Peter Popovic (born 1968), Swedish ice hockey player
- Peter Prusa (born 1944), East German ice hockey player
- Peter Pucher (born 1974), Slovak professional ice hockey forward
- Peter Quenneville (born 1994), Canadian ice hockey player
- Peter Raffl (born 1960), Austrian ice hockey player
- Peter Ratchuk (born 1977), American ice hockey player
- Peter Regin (born 1986), Danish ice hockey player
- Peter Sarno (born 1979), Canadian ice hockey player
- Peter Scamurra (born 1955), American ice hockey player
- Peter Scharf (born 1953), German ice hockey player
- Peter Schlagenhauf (born 1960), Swiss ice hockey player
- Peter Schwimmbeck (born 1941), German ice hockey player
- Peter Sejna (born 1979), Slovak ice hockey player
- Peter Shier (born 1955), Canadian ice hockey player
- Peter Sidorkiewicz (born 1963), Polish-Canadian ice hockey player
- Peter Šišovský (born 1991), Slovak ice hockey player
- Peter Sivák (born 1982), Slovak ice hockey player
- Peter Slobodian (1918–1986), Canadian ice hockey player
- Peter Soberlak (born 1969), Canadian ice hockey player
- Peter Sojčík (born 1986), Slovak ice hockey forward
- Peter Spornberger (born 1999), Italian ice hockey player
- Peter Stammbach (born 1937), Swiss ice hockey player
- Peter Staroň (born 1973), Slovak ice hockey player
- Peter Šťastný (born 1956), Slovak-Canadian ice hockey player
- Peter Stoykewych (born 1992), Canadian ice hockey player
- Peter Ström (born 1975), Swedish ice hockey player
- Peter Sturgeon (born 1954), Canadian ice hockey player
- Peter Sundström (born 1961), Swedish ice hockey player
- Peter Taglianetti (born 1963), American ice hockey player
- Peter Tiivola (born 1993), Finnish ice hockey player
- Peter Trokan (born 1980), Slovak ice hockey player
- Peter Tufford, Canadian ice hockey player
- Peter Valier (born 1992), French ice hockey player
- Peter Van Buskirk, American ice hockey coach
- Peter Veselovský (1964–2025), Czechoslovak ice hockey player
- Peter Wallin (born 1957), Swedish ice hockey player
- Peter Wennerström (born 1988), Swedish ice hockey player
- Peter Wespi (1943–2015), Swiss ice hockey player
- Peter Worrell (born 1977), Canadian ice hockey player
- Peter Zezel (1965–2009), Canadian ice hockey player
- Peter Zini (born 1951), Austrian ice hockey player
- Peter Znenahlik (born 1963), Austrian ice hockey player
- Peter Zuzin (born 1990), Slovak ice hockey player

=== Judo ===
- Peter Adelaar (1947–2004), Dutch judoka
- Peter Cousins (born 1981), British judoka
- Peter Jupke (born 1957), German judoka
- Peter Paige (judoka) (born 1939), Australian judoka
- Peter Paltchik (born 1992), Israeli judoka
- Peter Schlatter (born 1968), German judoka
- Peter Seisenbacher (born 1960), Austrian judoka
- Peter Snijders (born 1943), Dutch judoka
- Peter Žilka (born 1994), Slovak judoka

=== Karate ===
- Peter Consterdine, British karateka

=== Kickboxing ===
- Peter Aerts (born 1970), Dutch kickboxer

=== Lacrosse ===
- Peter Baum (born 1990), American lacrosse player
- Peter Inge (born 1977), Australian lacrosse player
- Peter Lough (born 1975), Canadian lacrosse player
- Peter McFetridge (born 1986), Canadian lacrosse player
- Peter Milliman, American lacrosse player and coach
- Peter Trombino (born 1985), lacrosse player
- Peter Vlahakis (born 1982), American lacrosse player

=== Lawn bowls ===
- Peter Belliss (born 1951), New Zealand lawn bowler
- Peter Fong (born 1941), Fijian lawn bowler
- Peter Horne (bowls), New Zealand Paralympic lawn bowler
- Peter McWhannell (1875–1943), New Zealand lawn bowler
- Peter Mutter, Canadian lawn bowler
- Peter Rheuben (1931–2014), Australian lawn bowler

=== Luge ===
- Peter Braunegger (born 1975), Austrian luger
- Peter Gschnitzer (born 1953), Italian luger
- Peter Iliev (born 1984), Bulgarian luger
- Peter Lechner (born 1966), Austrian luger
- Peter Penz (born 1984), Austrian luger
- Peter Reichnwallner, German luger
- Peter Votter, Italian luger

=== Martial Arts ===
- Peter de Been, Australian martial artist
- Peter Smit (1961–2005), Dutch martial artist
- Peter Sobotta (born 1987), Polish-born German mixed martial arts fighter
- Péter Varga (born 1974), Hungarian kickboxer
- Peter Verschuren, Dutch mixed martial arts fighter

=== Modern pentathlon ===
- Peter Burger (born 1954), Swiss modern pentathlete
- Péter Kelemen (pentathlete) (born 1946), Hungarian modern pentathlete
- Peter Lichtner-Hoyer (1925–2020), Austrian modern pentathlete
- Peter Little (pentathlete) (born 1933), British modern pentathlete
- Peter Macken (born 1938), Australian modern pentathlete and fencer
- Peter Minder (born 1956), Swiss modern pentathlete
- Peter Ridgway (pentathlete) (born 1949), Australian modern pentathlete
- Péter Sárfalvi (born 1970), Hungarian modern pentathlete
- Peter Steinmann (born 1962), Swiss modern pentathlete
- Peter Whiteside (1952–2020), British modern pentathlete
- Peter Zobl-Wessely (born 1949), Austrian modern pentathlete and fencer

=== Motorsport ===
- Peter Argetsinger (1950–2020), American racing driver
- Peter Arundell (1933–2009), British racing driver
- Peter Ashdown (born 1934), British racing driver
- Peter Boss (born 1975), American racing driver
- Peter Broeker (1926–1980), Canadian racing driver
- Peter Cunneen (1926–2007), Australian speedway rider
- Peter de Klerk (1935–2015), South African racing driver
- Peter Dempsey (born 1986), Irish racing driver
- Peter Dumbreck (born 1973), Scottish racing driver
- Peter Elkmann (born 1981), German racing driver
- Peter Gethin (1940–2011), British racing driver
- Peter Gibbons (born 1962), Canadian racing driver
- Peter Heatherington (born 1949), English rally driver
- Peter Hickman (born 1987), English motorcycle road racer
- Peter Hirt (1910–1992), Swiss racing driver
- Peter Jarman (1935–2007), English speedway rider
- Peter Kildemand (born 1989), Danish speedway rider
- Peter Kox (born 1964), Dutch racing driver
- Peter Kuhn (1955–2009), American racing driver
- Peter Lenz (1997–2010), American motorcycle racer
- Peter Liebing (born 1939), British motorcycle speedway rider
- Peter McLeod (born 1948), Australian racing driver
- Peter Mitchell-Thomson (1913–1963), English race car driver
- Peter Nahlin (born 1968), Swedish speedway rider
- Peter Öttl (born 1965), German motorcycle racer
- Peter Politiek (born 1984), Dutch motorcycle racer
- Peter Portante (born 1996), American racing driver
- Peter Revson (1939–1974), American racing driver
- Peter Scharmach (born 1964), German-New Zealand racing driver
- Péter Sebestyén (born 1994), Hungarian motorcycle racer
- Peter Sospenzo (born 1956), American racing driver and crew chief
- Peter Sundberg (born 1976), Swedish racing driver
- Peter Terting (born 1984), German racing driver
- Peter Thoeming (1947), Australian long-distance motorcycle rider
- Peter van Merksteijn Jr. (born 1982), Dutch rally driver
- Peter van Merksteijn Sr. (born 1956), Dutch racing and rally driver
- Peter Vodanovich (born 2001), New Zealand racing driver
- Peter Westbury (1938–2015), British racing driver
- Peter Würtele (born 1959), German speedway rider

=== Mountaineering ===
- Peter Athans (born 1957), American mountain climber
- Peter Aufschnaiter (1900–1973), Austrian mountaineer
- Peter Boardman (1950–1982), English mountaineer
- Peter Bohren (1822–1882), Swiss mountaineer
- Peter Habeler (born 1942), Austrian mountaineer
- Peter Hillary (born 1954), New Zealand mountain climber
- Peter Kaufmann-Bohren (1886–1971), Swiss alpinist
- Peter Mulgrew (1927–1979), New Zealand adventurer
- Peter Sarbach (1844–1930), Swiss mountain guide
- Peter Taugwalder (1820–1888), Swiss mountaineer

=== Poker ===
- Peter Eastgate (born 1985), Danish poker player
- Peter Jepsen (born 1982), Danish poker player
- Peter Jetten (born 1985), Canadian poker player
- Péter Traply (born 1987), Hungarian poker player
- Peter Vilandos (died 2022), Greek-American poker player

=== Rowing ===
- Peter Antonie (born 1958), Australian rower
- Peter Bakker (rower) (born 1934), Dutch rower
- Peter Betz (1929–1991), German rower
- Peter Bolliger (1937–2024), Swiss rower
- Peter Bos (born 1938), American rower
- Peter Bots (born 1942), Dutch rower
- Peter Brandt (1931–2022), British rower
- Peter Bredl (born 1951), Austrian rower
- Peter Bridge (born 1972), British rower
- Peter Chatain (born 1999), American rower
- Peter Cortes (born 1947), American rower
- Peter de Giles (1927–2015), British rower
- Peter Dembicki (born 1980), Canadian rower
- Peter Dignan (1955–2013), New Zealand rower
- Peter Donlon (1906–1979), American rower
- Peter Dulley (1903–1941), British rower
- Peter Evatt (1922–1972), Australian rower
- Peter Funnekötter (born 1946), West German rower
- Péter Galambos (born 1986), Hungarian rower
- Peter Gillon (1939–2018), Australian rower
- Peter Gorny (born 1941), German rower
- Peter Gübeli (1925–2014), Swiss rower
- Peter Guest (born 1938), Australian rower
- Peter Hein (rower) (born 1943), German rower
- Peter Hertel (born c. 1944), German rower
- Peter Hoeltzenbein (born 1971), German rower
- Peter Huck (born 1955), German rower
- Peter Kersten (born 1958), German rower
- Peter Kirkpatrick (1916–1995), British rower
- Peter Klug-Andersen (born c. 1958), Danish rower
- Peter Knapp (born 1949), British rower
- Péter Kokas (born 1946), Hungarian rower
- Peter Kremtz (1940–2014), East German rower
- Peter Lindsay (rowing) (born 1951), New Zealand rower
- Peter MacGowan (born 1958), Canadian rower
- Peter Mulkerrins (born 1964), British rower
- Peter Neusel (1941–2021), German rower
- Peter Niehusen (born 1951), West German coxswain and rower
- Peter Nordell (born 1966), American rower
- Peter Ording (born 1976), German rower
- Peter Paustian, German rower
- Peter Preiß (born 1952), Austrian rower
- Peter Prompe (born 1947), German rower
- Peter Purcell-Gilpin (born 1994), Zimbabwean rower
- Peter Rahn (born 1953), Swiss rower
- Peter Raper (1929–1999), Australian rower
- Peter Rudge (born 1981), British rowing cox
- Peter Salzbacher (born 1946), Austrian rower
- Peter Shakespear (born 1946), Australian rower
- Peter Sharis (born 1969), American rower
- Peter Sommerwil, Canadian rower
- Peter Stebler (1927–2010), Swiss rower
- Peter Stocker (born 1956), Swiss rower
- Peter Thiede (born 1968), German rowing cox
- Péter Tóvári (born 1951), Hungarian rower
- Peter Uhrig (born 1965), German rower
- Peter van der Noort (born 1974), Dutch rower
- Peter van Roye (born 1950), German rower
- Peter van Schie (born 1988), Dutch rower
- Peter Waddington (rower) (1937–2022), Australian rower
- Peter Watkinson, New Zealand rower
- Peter Werner (rower) (born 1950), German lightweight rower
- Peter Wetzstein (born 1949), Austrian coxswain
- Peter Wiersum (born 1984), Dutch rower
- Peter Zeun (born 1951), British rower

=== Rugby league ===
- Peter Armstead (born 1934), English rugby league footballer
- Peter Aspinall (born 1994), English rugby league footballer
- Peter Banner (born 1948), Wales rugby league footballer
- Peter Boulton, Australian rugby league footballer
- Peter Bracken (rugby league) (born 1931), Australian rugby league footballer
- Peter Carrington (rugby), English rugby league footballer
- Peter Cassilles (born 1952), Australian rugby league footballer
- Peter Dimond (1938–2021), Australia rugby league footballer
- Peter Diversi (1932–2018), Australian rugby league footballer
- Peter Flanagan (1941–2007), British rugby league footballer
- Peter Flanders, Australian rugby league footballer
- Peter Gentle (born 1965), Australian rugby league footballer and coach
- Peter Glynn (1952–2024), English rugby league footballer
- Peter Gorley (born 1951), English rugby league footballer
- Peter Grounds (born 1960), Australian rugby league footballer
- Peter Gurnick (born 1949), New Zealand rugby league footballer
- Peter Hola (born 1999), Australian rugby league footballer
- Peter Hood, British rugby league footballer
- Peter Inskip, Australian rugby league footballer
- Peter Jorgensen (born 1973), Australia international rugby union & league footballer
- Peter Lima, Samoan rugby league footballer
- Peter Louis (born 1945), Australian rugby league footballer and coach
- Peter Lupton (born 1982), English rugby league and rugby union footballer
- Peter Mamouzelos (born 2001), Greece international rugby league footballer
- Peter Mata'utia (born 1990), Australian rugby league footballer
- Peter McGrath (born 1955), Australian rugby league footballer
- Peter McPhail (born 1968), Australian rugby league footballer
- Peter Mellars (born 1959), New Zealand rugby league footballer and administrator
- Peter Metcalfe (1931–2016), England rugby league footballer
- Peter Moko, New Zealand Maori rugby league footballer
- Peter Moir (1882–1921), Australian dual-code rugby player
- Peter Moscatt (1943–2019), Australian rugby league footballer
- Peter Mulholland (c. 1953–2021), Australian rugby league footballer and coach
- Peter Norburn (1930–2017), English rugby league footballer
- Peter Pierse (1947–1991), Australian rugby league referee
- Peter Provan (1936–2010), Australian rugby league footballer
- Peter Ropati, New Zealand rugby league footballer and commentator
- Peter Rowles (born 1952), Australian rugby union and rugby league footballer
- Peter Shiels (born 1973), Australian rugby league footballer
- Peter Small (born 1939), Great Britain international rugby league footballer
- Peter Spring (born 1962), Australian rugby league footballer
- Peter Swanson (rugby) (1946–2003), South African rugby player
- Peter Trevitt, Australian rugby league footballer
- Peter Tunks (born 1958), Australian rugby league footballer and coach
- Peter Winchester (born 1949), Australian rugby league footballer
- Peter Wynn (born 1957), Australian rugby league footballer
- Peter Yaxley (1928–2015), New Zealand rugby league footballer and referee

=== Rugby union ===
- Peter Anton (rugby union) (1850–1911), Scottish rugby union player
- Peter Betham (born 1989), Australian rugby union player
- Peter Borlase (born 1985), New Zealand rugby union player and coach
- Peter Bracken (born 1977), Irish rugby union footballer and coach
- Peter Buxton (born 1978), English rugby union footballer
- Peter Candler (1914–1991), English rugby player
- Peter Clohessy (born 1966), Irish rugby union player
- Peter Crittle (1938–2024), Australian rugby union player
- Peter Cronjé (1949–2020), South African rugby union player
- Peter de Villiers (born 1957), South African professional rugby union coach
- Peter Dods (born 1958), Scottish rugby union player
- Peter Dooley (born 1994), Irish rugby union player
- Peter Douty (1903–1948), British Lions & Scotland international rugby union player
- Peter Durcan (born 1986), Irish rugby union player
- Peter Eastgate (rugby union) (1927–2007), New Zealand rugby union player
- Peter Fatialofa (1959–2013), Samoan rugby union footballer
- Peter Fenwicke (1932–1987), Australian rugby union player
- Peter Fitzgibbon (born 1975), Irish international rugby union referee
- Peter Flanagan (rugby union) (1886–1952), Australia international rugby union player
- Peter Grigg (born 1958), Australian rugby union winger
- Peter Hardwick (rugby union) (1877–1924), English rugby union player
- Peter Hepburn (1920–1996), Scottish rugby union player
- Peter Hewat (born 1978), Australian rugby union player
- Peter Horne (born 1989), Scottish rugby union footballer and coach
- Peter Horton (rugby union) (born 1945), English-born Australian rugby union player
- Peter Ianusevici (born 1950), Romanian rugby union footballer and coach
- Peter Jericevich (born 1989), Scottish rugby union player
- Peter Karia (born 1994), Kenyan rugby union player
- Peter Kimlin (born 1985), Australian rugby union player
- Peter Kininmonth (1924–2007), Scottish rugby union player
- Peter Lakai (born 2003), New Zealand rugby union player
- Peter Larter (born 1944), English rugby union footballer
- Peter Lillington, Scottish rugby union player
- Peter Loli (born 1980), Australian rugby union player
- Peter Karia (born 1994), Kenyan rugby union player
- Peter Kimlin (born 1985), Australian rugby union player
- Peter Lupton (born 1982), English rugby league and rugby union footballer
- Peter Marner (1936–2007), English cricketer and rugby union footballer
- Peter McCabe (rugby union) (born 1992), Irish rugby union player
- Peter McCallum, Scottish rugby union player
- Peter Mirrielees (born 1983), New Zealand rugby union player
- Peter Moir (1882–1921), Australian dual-code international rugby player
- Peter Murchie (born 1986), Scotland international rugby union footballer and coach
- Peter Nixon (rugby union) (born 1984), New Zealand rugby union player
- Peter O'Mahony (born 1989), Irish rugby union player
- Peter Owens (born 1983), Australian rugby union player
- Peter Playford (born 1980), Australian rugby union player
- Peter Poulos (rugby union) (born 1977), Samoan rugby union player
- Peter Preece (born 1949), English rugby union footballer
- Peter Rossborough (born 1948), English rugby union footballer and coach
- Peter Rothwell (rugby union) (1929–2013), Australian rugby union player
- Peter Rowles (born 1952), Australian rugby union and rugby league footballer
- Peter Saili (born 1988), New Zealand rugby union player
- Peter Sidoli (born 1980), Welsh rugby union player
- Peter Slattery (born 1965), Australian rugby union player
- Peter Sloane (born 1948), New Zealand international rugby union player
- Peter Stagg (born 1941), Scottish rugby union player
- Peter Steinberg (born 1971), American rugby player
- Peter Steven (born 1959), Scottish rugby union footballer
- Peter Denny Strang (1889–?), British Isles international rugby union player
- Peter Stringer (born 1977), Irish rugby player
- Peter Swanson (rugby) (1946–2003), South African rugby player
- Peter Thorburn (1939–2021), New Zealand rugby union player
- Peter Tiberio (born 1989), American rugby union player
- Peter Trunkfield (c. 1930–2010), English rugby union administrator
- Peter Umaga-Jensen (born 1997), New Zealand rugby union player
- Peter Wackett (born 1987), English rugby union player
- Peter Warfield (born 1951), England international rugby union player
- Peter Whipp (born 1950), South African rugby union player
- Peter Winterbottom (born 1960), English rugby union footballer
- Peter Woodruff (1920–2019), English international rugby union player
- Peter Yarranton (1924–2003), English rugby union footballer and sports administrator

=== Sailing ===
- Peter Ahrendt (1934–2013), German sailor
- Peter Aldag (born 1965), German sailor
- Peter Allam (born 1959), British sailor
- Peter Attrill (born 1929), Australian sailor
- Peter Bischoff (1904–1976), German sailor
- Peter Bjorn (born 1939), Canadian sailor
- Peter Bromby (born 1964), Bermudian sailor
- Peter Burggraaff (born 1971), Dutch sailor
- Peter Commette (born 1954), American sailor
- Peter Conde (born 1958), Australian sailor
- Péter Czégai (born 1976), Hungarian sailor
- Peter Denzel (born 1939), Austrian sailor
- Peter Dix (1953–1988), Irish sailor
- Peter Due (born 1947), Danish sailor
- Peter Erzberger (born 1941), Brazilian sailor
- Peter Fazer (1934–1998), Finnish sailor
- Peter Ficker (born 1951), Brazilian sailor
- Peter Gamble (sailor) (born 1937), Hong Kong sailor
- Peter Gilmour (born 1960), Australian sailing keeper
- Peter Holmberg (born 1960), U.S. Virgin Islands sailor
- Peter Jaffe (1913–1982), British competitive sailor
- Peter Kolni (1948–2022), Swedish sailor
- Peter Luschan (born 1937), Austrian sailor
- Peter Mander (1928–1998), New Zealand sailor
- Peter Mangels (1927–1991), Brazilian sailor
- Peter Milburn (born 1945), Caymanian sailor
- Peter Naumann (1941–2024), German sailor
- Peter Newlands (born 1953), British sailor
- Peter Reade (born 1939), British sailor
- Peter Rebien (born 1935), German sailor
- Peter Šaraškin (born 1967), Estonian sailor
- Peter Schlütter (1893–1959), Danish sailor
- Peter Stülcken (born 1936), German sailor
- Peter Sundelin (born 1947), Swedish sailor
- Peter Tallberg (1937–2015), Finnish sailor
- Peter Tangvald (1924–1991), Norwegian sailor and adventurer
- Peter Theurer (born 1969), Swiss sailor
- Peter van Niekerk (born 1971), Dutch sailor
- Peter von Koskull (born 1963), Finnish sailor
- Peter Warner (1931–2021), Australian fisherman and yachtsman
- Peter Winters (born 1956), Belgian sailor

=== Shooting ===
- Peter Blecher (1934–2008), German sports shooter
- Peter Boden (born 1947), British sports shooter
- Peter Dolfen (1880–1947), American sport shooter
- Peter Durben, American sport shooter
- Peter Flippant (born 1962), British sports shooter
- Peter Gabrielsson (born 1960), Swedish sports shooter
- Peter Gorewski (born 1944), German sports shooter
- Peter Heinz (born 1954), German sports shooter
- Peter Hellenbrand (born 1985), Dutch sport shooter
- Peter Jory (born 1974), British sport shooter
- Peter Kohnke (1941–1975), German sport shooter
- Peter Laurence (sport shooter) (born 1931), Kenyan sports shooter
- Peter Papps (born 1939), Australian sports shooter
- Peter Paternelli (1856–?), Austrian sport shooter
- Peter Ruch (born 1941), Swiss sports shooter
- Peter Wray (born 1937), Australian sports shooter

=== Skateboarding ===
- Peter Ramondetta (born 1982), American professional skateboarder

=== Ski jumping ===
- Peter Eržen (born 1941), Slovenian ski jumper
- Peter Florjančič (1919–2020), Slovenian ski jumper
- Peter Frenette (born 1992), American ski jumper
- Péter Kelemen (ski jumper) (born 1999), Hungarian ski jumper
- Peter Leitner (born 1956), German ski jumper
- Peter Prevc (born 1992), Slovenian ski jumper
- Peter Rohwein (born 1962), German ski jumper
- Peter Štefančič (born 1947), Slovenian ski jumper
- Peter Žonta (born 1979), Slovenian ski jumper

=== Skiing ===
- Peter Arnesson (born 1980), Swedish ski-orienteering competitor
- Peter Heli (born 1969), Estonian Nordic combined skier
- Peter Lahdenpera (1935–2019), American skier
- Peter Speight (born 1992), British freestyle skier
- Peter Tancock (born 1940), British skier

=== Snooker ===
- Peter Ebdon (born 1970), English snooker player
- Peter Francisco (snooker player) (born 1962), South African snooker player
- Peter Lines (born 1969), English snooker player

=== Snowboarding ===
- Peter Thorndike (born 1977), American snowboarder

=== Speed skating ===
- Peter Adeberg (born 1968), German speed skater
- Peter Büttner (born 1936), Swiss speed skater
- Peter Creed (born 1987), Welsh squash player
- Péter Darázs (born 1985), Hungarian speed skater
- Peter Groseclose (born 2007), Filipino speed skater
- Peter Nottet (born 1944), Dutch speed skater
- Peter Sinnerud (1876–1972), Norwegian speed skater
- Peter Toyfl (1941–2025), Austrian speed skater

=== Squash ===
- Peter Fairlie (born 1957), Scottish squash player
- Peter Nicol (born 1973), Scottish squash player
- Peter Verow (born 1953), English squash player

=== Surfing ===
- Peter Mel (born 1969), American surfer

=== Swimming ===
- Peter Andrew, South African swimming coach
- Peter Berggren (born 1962), Swedish swimmer
- Peter Bermel (born 1967), German swimmer
- Peter Broscienski (born 1958), German swimmer
- Peter Bruch (born 1955), German swimmer
- Peter Coughlan (born 1947), Australian swimmer
- Peter J. Cutino (1933–2004), American swimming and water polo coach
- Peter Daland (1921–2014), American swimming coach
- Peter Doak (born 1944), Australian swimmer
- Peter Dobson (swimmer) (born 1962), Canadian swimmer
- Peter Drost (born 1958), Dutch swimmer
- Peter Feil (1947–2017), Swedish swimmer
- Peter Fick (1913–1980), American swimmer
- Peter Hanan (1915–2008), New Zealand swimmer
- Péter Holoda (born 1996), Hungarian swimmer
- Péter Horváth (swimmer) (born 1974), Hungarian swimmer
- Peter Hrdlitschka (born 1955), Canadian swimmer
- Peter Hull (born 1965), British Paralympic swimmer
- Peter Jervis (1931–2015) English swimmer
- Peter Kendrew (born 1940), English swimmer
- Peter Knust (born 1960), German swimmer
- Peter Leek (born 1988), Australian Paralympic swimmer
- Peter Mankoč (born 1978), Slovenian swimmer
- Peter Mingie (1931–1999), Canadian swimmer
- Peter Nocke (born 1955), German swimmer
- Peter Pettersson (born 1957), Swedish swimmer
- Peter Prijdekker (born 1948), Dutch swimmer
- Peter Remmel (born 1954), German swimmer
- Peter Rocca (born 1957), American swimmer
- Peter Rohde (swimmer) (born 1965), Danish swimmer
- Peter Rosenkranz (born 1953), German swimmer
- Peter Sitt (born 1969), German swimmer
- Peter Steinwender (1928–2011), Austrian swimmer
- Péter Szabó (swimmer) (born 1968), Hungarian swimmer
- Peter Szmidt (born 1961), Canadian swimmer
- Peter Tonkin (born 1948), Australian swimmer
- Peter Vanderkaay (born 1984), American swimmer
- Peter Wetzlar (born 1997), Zimbabwean swimmer

=== Table tennis ===
- Peter Akinlabi (born 1973), Nigerian table tennis player
- Peter Franz (born 1971), German table tennis player
- Peter Lovaš (born 1978), Slovak para table tennis player
- Peter Mihálik (born 1976), Slovak para table tennis player
- Péter Pálos (born 1985), Hungarian para table tennis player
- Peter Rosenmeier (born 1984), Danish para table tennis player
- Péter Rózsás (1943–2024), Hungarian table tennis player

=== Taekwondo ===
- Peter López (born 1981), Peruvian taekwondo athlete

=== Tennis ===
- Peter Aungier (1855–1914), Irish tennis player
- Peter Ayers (born 1973), American tennis coach
- Peter Ballauff (born 1963), German tennis player
- Peter Bertran (born 1996), Dominican Republic tennis player
- Peter Bothwell (born 1995), Northern Irish tennis player
- Peter Burwash (1945–2022), Canadian tennis player and coach
- Peter Carlsson (born 1963), Swedish tennis player
- Peter Cawthorn (1931–1999), Australian tennis player
- Peter Dellavedova, Australian tennis player
- Peter Doerner (born 1950), Australian tennis player
- Peter Doohan (1961–2017), Australian tennis player
- Peter Elter (born 1958), West German tennis player
- Peter Feigl (born 1951), Austrian tennis player
- Peter Fishbach (born 1947), American tennis player
- Peter Flintsø (born 1968), Danish tennis player
- Peter Gojowczyk (born 1989), German tennis player
- Peter Handoyo (born 1979), Indonesian tennis player
- Peter Holl (born 1955), German tennis player
- Peter Kobelt (born 1990), American tennis player
- Peter Luczak (born 1979), Australian tennis player
- Peter Lundgren (1965–2024), Swedish tennis player and coach
- Peter McNamara (1955–2019), Australian tennis player and coach
- Peter Moraing (born 1961), German tennis player
- Peter Norfolk (born 1960), British wheelchair tennis player
- Peter Nyborg (born 1969), Swedish tennis player
- Peter Oatey (born 1946), South Australian sportsman
- Peter Polansky (born 1988), Canadian tennis player
- Peter Rennert (born 1958), American tennis player
- Peter Smylie (born 1958), Australian tennis player
- Peter Svensson (tennis) (born 1961), Swedish tennis player
- Péter Szőke (1947–2022), Hungarian tennis player
- Peter Thrupp (born 1963), Australian tennis player
- Peter Torebko (born 1988), German tennis player
- Peter Tramacchi (born 1970), Australian tennis player
- Peter van Lingen (born 1943), South African tennis player
- Peter Vikström (born 1977), Swedish wheelchair tennis player
- Peter Wessels (born 1978), Dutch tennis player

=== Triathlon ===
- Peter Croes (born 1984), Belgian triathlete

=== Volleyball ===
- Peter Bakare (born 1989), British volleyball player
- Peter Banas (born 1973), Czechoslovak Paralympic volleyball player
- Peter Blangé (born 1964), Dutch volleyball player
- Peter Damajka (born 1962), Czechoslovak Paralympic volleyball player
- Peter Gartmayer (born 1978), Austrian beach volleyball player
- Peter Meszároš, Slovak Paralympic volleyball player
- Peter Michalovič (born 1990), Slovak volleyball player
- Peter Moravčík (born 1961), Czechoslovak Paralympic volleyball player
- Peter Nádaský, Slovak Paralympic volleyball player
- Peter Ondrovič (born 1995), Slovak volleyball player
- Peter Quiel (born 1997), Filipino volleyball player
- Peter Tholse (born 1965), Swedish volleyball player
- Peter Torres (born 1993), Filipino volleyball player

=== Water polo ===
- Peter Asch (born 1948), American water polo player
- Péter Biros (born 1976), Hungarian water polo player
- Peter Carlström (born 1956), Swedish water polo player
- Peter Hardie (1921–1960), British water polo player
- Peter Horňák (born 1964), Slovak water polo player
- Peter Hudnut (born 1980), American water polo player
- Péter Kuna (born 1965), Hungarian water polo player
- Peter Nižný (born 1977), Slovak water polo player
- Peter Pass (1933–2012), British water polo player
- Peter Riedl (1910–1992), Austrian water polo player
- Peter Röhle (born 1957), German water polo player
- Peter Rund (born 1943), German water polo player
- Péter Rusorán (1940–2012), Hungarian water polo player
- Peter Stange (born 1931), American water polo player
- Peter Teicher (born 1944), German water polo player
- Peter Varellas (born 1984), American water polo player
- Peter Veszelits (born 1968), Slovak water polo player

=== Weightlifting ===
- Peter Arthur (born 1939), British weightlifter
- Péter Baczakó (1951–2008), Hungarian weightlifter
- Peter Immesberger (born 1960), German weightlifter
- Peter Kilapa (born 1970), Papua New Guinean weightlifter
- Peter Kirkbride (born 1987), Scottish weightlifter
- Peter Petzold (born 1949), German weightlifter
- Peter Pinsent (born 1960), British weightlifter
- Péter Tamton (born 1976), Hungarian weightlifter

=== Wheelchair racing ===
- Peter Trotter (1956–2014), Australian wheelchair racer

=== Windsurfing ===
- Peter Bonello (born 1961), Maltese windsurfer

=== Wrestling ===
- Peter Amey (born 1935), British wrestler
- Peter Avalon (born 1989), American professional wrestler
- Péter Bacsa (born 1970), Hungarian wrestler
- Péter Bácsi (born 1983), Hungarian Greco-Roman wrestler
- Peter Döring (born 1943), German wrestler
- Peter Enzinger (1916–?), Austrian wrestler
- Peter Fatouros, Greek-American wrestler
- Peter Germer (born 1949), German wrestler
- Peter Jutzeler (1940–2020), Swiss wrestler
- Peter Kokotowitsch (1890–1968), Austrian wrestler
- Peter Luck (wrestler) (1925–2015), British wrestler
- Peter Maivia (1937–1982), Samoan-American professional wrestler
- Peter Mehringer (1910–1987), American wrestler
- Péter Módos (born 1987), Hungarian wrestler
- Peter Nettekoven (born 1940), German wrestler
- Peter Neumair (born 1950), German wrestler
- Peter Pecha (born 1975), Slovak freestyle wrestler
- Péter Piti (1935–1978), Hungarian wrestler
- Peter Sauer (1900–1949), Russian-American professional wrestler
- Peter Senerchia (born 1967), American wrestler
- Peter Thornley (born 1941), English professional wrestler
- Peter Tihanyi (born 2000), Hungarian professional wrestler

== Other occupations ==
- Peter the Wild Boy (1713–1785), German feral child
- Peter (floruit 926), governor of Rome, Roman consul and brother of Pope John X
- Peter (usurper) (died 506), Roman "tyrant" (usurper) against the Visigothic rulers of Spain
- Peter the Byzantine (fl. 1770–1808), Greek cantor and composer
- Peter the Patrician (c. 500–565), East Roman or Byzantine official, diplomat and historian
- Peter the Peloponnesian (c. 1735–1778), Greek cantor and composer
- Peter Abelard (c. 1079–1142), French philosopher
- Peter Acworth (born 1970), British web entrepreneur
- Peter Aczel (1941–2023), British mathematician and logician
- Peter Adds, New Zealand indigenous issues academic
- Peter Adeniyi (born 1944), Nigerian academic and administrator
- Peter Adriaens, American academic
- Peter Ady (1914–2004), English economist
- Peter Agostini (1913–1993), American sculptor
- Peter Agricola (1525–1585), Renaissance humanist
- Peter S. Albin (1934–2008), American economist
- Peter Aleshkovsky (born 1957), Russian writer, historian, broadcaster, television presenter and journalist
- Peter Alger (born 1952), New Zealand potter
- Peter Allgeier, American trade representative
- Peter Alma (1886–1969), Dutch artist
- Peter F. B. Alsop (1935–2014), Australian engineer and historian
- Peter Alston (c. 1765–1804), American outlaw
- Peter Alter (born 1940), German historian
- Peter Alward, Canadian philosopher
- Peter Angelis (1685–1734), Flemish painter
- Peter Angermann (born 1945), German painter
- Peter Anich (1723–1766), Austrian cartographer and inventor
- Peter Annan, American engineer
- Peter Anton, American artist and sculptor
- Peter L. Antonelli (1941–2020), American mathematician
- Peter Archambo I (1699–1759), Huguenot goldsmith
- Peter Arcidiacono (born 1971), American economist and econometrician
- Peter Arnott (1931–1990), British author, puppeteer and professor of drama
- Peter Aronsson (born 1959), Swedish historian
- Peter Arshinov, Russian anarchist revolutionary
- Peter Asbeck (born 1947), American engineer
- Peter J. Aschenbrenner (born 1945), American historian
- Peter Ashworth (born 1953), English photographer
- Peter Assmann (born 1963), Austrian writer and visual artist
- Peter Aucoin (1943–2011), Canadian academic
- Peter Auer (born 1954), German linguist
- Peter Avery (1923–2008), British scholar of Persian
- Peter Aylen, timber producer and later public official
- Peter Bance, British historian
- Peter Banner, English-born American architect
- Peter Barakan (born 1951), English DJ, broadcaster and author
- Peter Barbey, American publisher
- Peter Barsocchini, American screenwriter
- Peter Bart (born 1932), American journalist and film producer
- Peter Basch (1921–2004), American photographer
- Peter W. Bates, American mathematician
- Peter Batkin (1953–2018), English auctioneer
- Peter Baumgart (born 1931), German historian
- Peter Beadle (1933–2021), New Zealand artist
- Peter Beal (1944–2024), British scholar of manuscripts
- Peter Beatty (1910–1949), English racehorse owner and breeder
- Peter Beaven (1925–2012), New Zealand architect
- Peter Bebb, American special effects supervisor
- Peter Belches (1796–1890), Scottish explorer in Western Australia
- Peter Belt (1930–2017), British inventor
- Peter Benner (born 1967), German mathematician
- Peter Bennetts (born 1967), Australian artist
- Peter Bentzon (1783–1850), American silversmith
- Peter Berck (1950–2018), American economist
- Peter Beresford (born 1945), British academic, writer, researcher and activist
- Peter Berglar (1919–1989), German historian
- Peter Berlin (born 1942), German-American photographer, artist, filmmaker and clothing designer
- Peter Berndtson (1909–1972), American architect
- Peter Anthony Bertocci (1910–1989), American philosopher
- Peter Betthausen (born 1941), German art historian
- Peter Bialobrzeski, German photographer and professor
- Peter Biar Ajak (born 1983), South Sudanese peace activist, scholar and former political prisoner
- Peter J. Bickel, Romanian-born American statistician
- Peter Bicknell (1907–1995), British architect
- Peter Bielik, Slovak historian
- Peter Biľak (born 1973), Slovak graphic and typeface designer
- Peter Biller (born 1945), British historian
- Peter Binoit (1590–1632), German painter
- Peter Birkhäuser (1911–1976), Swiss poster artist, portraitist and painter
- Peter Birmann (1758–1844), Swiss painter
- Peter Birro (born 1966), Swedish script writer, poet and musician
- Peter Bisaillon (c. 1662–1742), New France fur trader and interpreter
- Peter C. Bjarkman (1941–2018), American historian, author and commentator
- Peter Blackman (1909–1993), British civil rights activist, writer and communist
- Peter Bland (born 1934), British-New Zealand actor and poet
- Peter Blatch (born 1953), Australian scouter
- Peter Blecha, American historian and author
- Peter Andreas Blix (1831–1901), Norwegian architect and engineer
- Peter Blokhuis (born 1947), Dutch philosopher and historian
- Peter Bloom, American academic
- Peter Blume (1906–1992), Belarusian-born American painter and sculptor
- Peter Blundell (c. 1520–1601), English clothier
- Peter Boag, Canadian academic
- Peter Board (1858–1945), Australian educationist and public servant
- Peter Boatman (1953–2010), British former police officer
- Peter Boatwright, American academic
- Peter August Böckstiegel (1889–1951), German painter
- Peter M. Boenisch, German theatre researcher
- Peter Boettke (born 1960), American economist
- Peter Bofinger (born 1954), German economist
- Peter Bogetoft (born 1957), Danish author, economist, and professor
- Peter Boghossian (born 1966), American philosopher and pedagogist
- Peter Bohlin (born 1937), American architect
- Peter Boizot (1929–2018), English restaurateur
- Peter Christian Bønecke (1848–1910), Danish architect
- Peter Bonfield (engineer), British engineer
- Peter Bonner, Australian artist
- Peter Bonner (storyteller), American storyteller, actor, writer and historian
- Peter Bonnington (born 1975), British engineer
- Peter Bonsall-Boone (c. 1938–2017), Australian LGBT activist
- Peter A. Boodberg (1903–1972), American sinologist
- Peter Booth Wiley, American academic
- Peter Borsari (1939–2006), American-Swiss photographer
- Peter Borsay (1950–2020), British historian
- Peter Borwein (1953–2020), Canadian mathematician
- Peter Boshier (born 1952), New Zealand Chief Ombudsman
- Peter Bossaerts (born 1960), American economist
- Peter Boston (1918–1999), British architect and illustrator
- Peter Bouckaert (activist), Belgian human rights activist
- Peter Bourne (born 1939), English-American civil servant
- Peter Bouwknegt (born 1961), Dutch mathematician
- Peter Bowling (1864–1942), Australian trade unionist
- Peter Boynton (born 1957), American academic
- Peter A. Bradford, American nuclear Regulatory Commissioner
- Peter Bradshaw (born 1962), British writer and film critic
- Peter Bradshaw (aeronautical engineer) (1935–2024), British engineer
- Peter Brandes (1947–2025), Danish artist
- Peter Andreas Brandt (1792–1862), Norwegian artist
- Peter Branscombe, English academic, musicologist and writer
- Peter Brant II (born 1993), American socialite and model
- Peter Braunstein (born 1964), American former journalist, writer and playwright
- Peter Bray (born 1957), British kayaker
- Peter Brearey (1939–1998), British secularist, socialist and journalist
- Peter Bredsdorff (1913–1981), Danish architect and urban planner
- Peter Breisiger, 16th-century German organ builder
- Peter Brenner (1937–2019), Swiss civil engineer and geologist
- Peter Breuer (1856–1930), German sculptor
- Peter Bridgewater (born 1945), Australian conservationist
- Peter H. Brieger (1898–1983), German art historian
- Peter Brimelow (born 1947), American white supremacist
- Peter Brotherhood (1838–1902), English engineer
- Peter Brough (1916–1999), English radio ventriloquist
- Peter Arrell Browne Widener II (1895–1948), American racehorse owner
- Peter Bruff (1812–1900), British civil engineer
- Peter Bruner (c. 1845–1938), African-American slave, soldier and author
- Peter Brunt (1917–2005), British academic and ancient historian
- Peter Bryan (born 1969), English serial killer and cannibal
- Peter Buchan (1790–1854), Scottish editor, publisher and collector
- Peter Buchanan-Smith, American artist
- Peter Buchman (born 1967), American screenwriter
- Peter Bühlmann (born 1965), Swiss mathematician
- Peter Bunnell (1937–2021), American author, scholar and historian
- Peter Perez Burdett (1734–1793), English painter
- Peter Bürgisser (born 1962), Swiss mathematician and theoretical computer scientist
- P. B. Burgoyne (1844–1929), English wine merchant
- Peter Burman (born 1944), British architectural historian
- Peter Burmeister (1941–2019), German mathematician
- Peter Burnitz (1824–1886), German painter
- Peter Burr, American artist
- Peter Busby (born 1952), British architect
- Peter Bussian, American photographer and filmmaker
- Peter Butenschøn (born 1944), Norwegian architect
- Peter L. Buttenwieser (1935–2018), American educator and philanthropist
- Peter Caddick-Adams, British academic historian and broadcaster
- Peter Caddy (1917–1994), hotelier and co-founder of Findhorn Foundation
- Peter Cakebread, video game designer
- Peter Calder (1926–2013), British mechanical engineer
- Peter Callas (born 1952), Australian artist, curator and writer
- Peter Calthorpe, American architect
- Peter Camani, Canadian artist and sculptor
- Peter P. Canavan, Irish police officer
- Peter Candid (1548–1628), Flemish-born Mannerist painter
- Peter Cappelli (born 1956), American economist
- Peter Carder (fl. 1577–1586), British mariner
- Peter Cardew (1939–2020), British-Canadian architect
- Peter Carter-Ruck (1914–2003), English solicitor
- Peter G. Casazza, American mathematician
- Peter Cassells, Irish trade union leader
- Peter William Cassey (1831–1917), African-American 19th-century school founder, minister, and abolitionist
- Peter Caulitz (1650–1719), German painter
- Peter Caws (1931–2020), British American philosopher and administrator
- Peter Ceffons, French theologian and philosopher
- Peter Celsing (1920–1974), Swedish architect
- Peter Chamberlin (1919–1978), English architect
- Peter Charanis, American historian
- Peter Charney (born 1989), Canadian bungee jumper
- Peter Chartier, fur trader, tribal chief and temperance activist
- Peter Checkland (born 1930), British management scientist and systems theorist
- Peter Chelishchev (1745–1811), Russian ethnographer
- Peter Francis Chenu, British sculptor
- Peter Cherif, French Islamic militant
- Peter Chester (born 1954), English convicted murderer and pedophile
- Peter Cho, chef and restaurateur
- Peter Sienpin Chow, American electrical engineer
- Peter Churcher, Australian artist
- Peter Clarricoats (1932–2020), British engineer
- Peter Clausen (naturalist) (1801–1872), Danish natural history collector
- Peter Clemoes (1920–1996), British historian
- Peter Clewes, Canadian architect
- Peter Clothier, British writer and art critic
- Peter Clouston (1807–1888), Scottish insurance broker and philanthropist
- Peter Coade (1942–2025), Canadian meteorologist and television and radio weather presenter
- Peter Coats (born 1938), Scottish thread manufacturer and philanthropist
- Peter Cockburn (born 1946), philatelist
- Peter Cockroft (born 1957), English weather forecaster
- Peter Coclanis, American historian
- Peter Wilson Coldham (1926–2012), British genealogist
- Peter Colfs (1906–1983), Belgian painter
- Peter Collis, English visual artist
- Peter Comrie (1868–1944), Scottish mathematician and author
- Peter Connelly (born 1972), British video game composer and sound designer
- Peter Coogan, American comics scholar
- Peter Copeland (1942–2006), British archivist
- Peter Corby (1924–2021), British inventor
- Peter Corke (born 1959), Australian roboticist
- Peter Corless, game designer
- Peter Corlett, American sculptor
- Peter Corrigan (1941–2016), Australian architect
- Peter Coss (born 1946), British historian
- Peter Cottrell, British sailor, writer and historian
- Peter J. Countryman (1942–1992), American social activist
- Peter Cowie (born 1939), British film historian and author
- Peter Julius Coyet (1618–1667), Swedish envoy to England
- Peter Cozzens (born 1957), American historian
- Peter Craig (born 1969), American novelist and screenwriter
- Peter Cramer (1726–1782), Danish painter
- Peter Cramton (born 1957), American economist and academic
- Peter Crerar (c. 1785–1856), Scottish-Canadian civil engineer
- Peter Crill (1925–2005), bailiff of Jersey
- Peter Crolla, British engineer
- Peter Crüger (1580–1639), German polymath
- Peter Cryle, Australian scholar
- Peter Culicover, American linguist
- Peter A. Cundall, British engineer
- Peter Cundall (1927–2021), English-born Australian horticulturalist
- Peter Cuong Franklin, Vietnamese-American chef
- Peter Ayodele Curtis Joseph (1920–2006), Nigerian nationalist
- Peter Cvjetanovic (born 1996), American former white supremacist
- Peter Czartan, claimed supercentenarian
- Peter Dalgaard (born 1959), Danish statistician
- Peter Dalglish (born 1957), Canadian philanthropist and sex offender
- Peter Dallos (born 1934), former Northwestern University professor
- Peter Daltrey (born 1946), English painter
- Peter Danckerts de Rij (1605–1661), Dutch painter
- Peter Danckwerts (1916–1984), George Cross recipient and chemical engineer
- Peter A. Danielson, philosopher
- Peter Danko, American inventor, designer and artist
- Peter Darvall, Australian academic
- Peter Dazeley, British photographer
- Peter De Abrew (1862–1940), Sri Lankan Sinhala industrialist and philanthropist
- Peter de Cupere (born 1970), Belgian artist
- Peter de Francia (1921–2012), Italian-British painter
- Peter de Jager, computer engineer
- Peter Y. De Jong (1915–2005), American reformed minister and professor
- Peter de Medburn, English jurist and university chancellor
- Peter de Montfort (1205–1265), English magnate, soldier and diplomat
- Peter de Rome (1924–2014), American writer, photographer and director of gay-themed, erotic films
- Peter de Sève, American artist
- Peter De Waal, Australian LGBT rights activist
- Peter De Wint (1784–1849), English painter
- Peter de Witte III (1617–1667), Flemish baroque painter
- Peter Deakins, British architect
- Peter Warren Dease (1788–1863), Canadian fur trader and Arctic explorer
- Peter Debbins, American spy for Russia
- Peter Dedon, American engineer
- Peter DeFeo (1902–1993), American mobster
- Peter Deinboll (1915–1944), Norwegian engineer and resistance member
- Peter Delfyett (born 1959), American engineer
- Peter DeMaria (born 1960), American architect and artist
- Peter DeMarzo, American economist
- Peter Dembowski (1928–1971), German mathematician
- Peter Demeter (born 1933), Canadian convicted murderer
- Peter Dendle (born 1968), American folklorist
- Peter B. Denyer (1953–2010), British academic
- Peter Denz (1940–2022), German engineer
- Peter Derow (1944–2006), American historian
- Peter Desaga (1812–1879), German instrument maker
- Peter Desbarats (1933–2014), Canadian author, playwright and journalist
- Peter Deunov (1864–1944), Bulgarian philosopher and spiritual teacher
- Peter Diamandis (born 1961), Greek-American engineer, physician and entrepreneur
- Peter Diamandopoulos (1928–2015), Greek-American university president
- Peter DiFronzo (1933–2020), American mobster
- Peter Diggle (born 1950), British statistician
- Peter Dillon (1788–1847), sea captain, explorer, and writer
- Peter DiMaggio, American engineer and soccer player
- Peter Dimmock (1920–2015), British sports broadcaster
- Peter Dinda, American electrical engineer
- Peter DiPilato (born 1976), American photographer
- Peter Dollar (1847–1943), English architect and surveyor
- Peter Dombrovskis (1945–1996), Australian photographer
- Peter Doone, New Zealand police officer
- Peter Doroshenko (born 1962), American art curator
- Peter Dowdeswell (born 1940), British competitive eater
- Peter A. Dowling, British screenwriter
- Peter Drahos, Australian academic
- Peter Dreher (1932–2020), German artist
- Peter Dreier (born 1948), American urban policy analyst
- Peter Driben (1903–1968), American artist
- Peter Drysdale (born 1938), Australian economist
- Peter Stephen Du Ponceau (1760–1844), French-born American linguist, philosopher and jurist
- Peter Duchan, American playwright and screenwriter
- Peter Duffy (1954–1999), British barrister
- Peter Dupas (born 1953), Australian serial killer and rapist
- Peter Duren (1935–2020), American mathematician
- Peter Dusek (1945–2024), Austrian historian
- Peter Duus (1933–2022), American historian
- Peter Dzvimbo, Zimbabwean academic
- Peter Eade (1919–1979), English theatrical agent
- Peter D. Easton, American accountancy academic
- Peter Edes (1756–1840), American printer
- Peter Edmonds (1948–2005), British police officer
- Peter David Edstrom (1873–1938), American sculptor
- Peter Egeli (born 1934), American painter
- Peter Egge (1869–1959), Norwegian author, journalist and playwright
- Peter Egger, Austrian economist
- Peter Egner (1922–2011), Yugoslav-born naturalized American citizen & former Nazi SS & SD member
- Peter Eisenman (born 1932), American architect
- Peter Elbow (1935–2025), American academic
- Peter Eldin, British author and magician
- Peter Ellenshaw (1913–2007), English painter
- Peter Elleray (born 1958), English engineer and race car designer
- Peter Elmsley (1774–1825), English classical scholar
- Peter Elson (1947–1998), English science fiction illustrator
- Peter Henry Emerson (1856–1936), British writer and photographer
- Peter Engelmann (1823–1874), German American educationist
- Peter Englund (born 1950), Swedish economist
- Peter Entwisle (1948–2018), New Zealand art historian
- Peter Erler (born 1961), German historian
- Peter Ermakov (1884–1952), Russian Bolshevik revolutionary and participant in the execution of the imperial Romanov family
- Peter Erskine, American artist
- Peter Esdaile (born 1947), Norwegian painter and sculptor
- Peter Esele, Nigerian unionist
- Peter Eskilsson (1820–1872), Swedish painter
- Peter Maxwell Ewart (1918–2001), Canadian painter
- Peter Exley (born 1964), American architect
- Peter Fabell, British magician
- Peter Carl Fabergé (1846–1920), Russian jeweller
- Peter Fahy (born 1959), British police officer
- Peter Falconet (1741–1791), French painter
- Peter Fanucchi, American winemaker
- Peter Farb (1929–1980), American linguist
- Peter Fawcus (1915–2003), British colonial administrator
- Peter Feibleman (1930–2015), American screenwriter
- Peter H. Feist (1928–2015), German art historian
- Peter Feltus (1942–2012), American philatelist
- Peter Fend, American artist
- Peter Fendi (1796–1842), Austrian artist
- Peter E. Fernbank, British philatelist
- Peter Fidler (1769–1822), British surveyor, map-maker, fur trader and explorer
- Peter M. Fillerup (1953–2016), American sculptor
- Peter Fingesten (1916–1987), American sculptor
- Peter Firmin (1928–2018), English artist and puppet maker
- Peter C. Fishburn (1936–2021), American mathematician
- Peter Fishman (born 1955), Russian sculptor and painter
- Peter FitzSimons (born 1961), Australian author, commentator, radio and television presenter
- Peter Flannery (born 1951), English playwright and screenwriter
- Peter Fleet, woodcut artist and printer
- Peter Flinsch (1920–2010), Canadian artist
- Peter Flora (born 1944), Austrian academic
- Peter Florence (born 1964), British festival director
- Peter Flötner (c. 1485–1546), German designer, sculptor and printmaker
- Peter Floud (1911–1960), British civil servant and official
- Peter Fluck (born 1941), British caricaturist
- Peter Foerster (1887–1948), German painter
- Peter Foggo (1930–1993), British architect
- Peter Folkes (1923–2019), English painter
- Peter Fookes (1933–2020), British engineering geologist
- Peter Forakis (1927–2009), American artist and professor
- Peter Wilhelm Forchhammer (1801–1894), German classical scholar, classical archaeologist and politician
- Peter Forrest, Australian philosopher
- Peter Forsskål (1732–1763), Swedish explorer, orientalist and naturalist
- Peter J. Fos (born 1949), first president and seventh chief executive of the University of New Orleans
- Peter S. Fosl, American academic
- Peter Fossett (1815–1901), former slave
- Peter Foxcroft (1819–1896), English manager, inventor, preacher and activist
- Peter Francese (born 1941), American trends expert
- Peter Franchoys (1606–1654), Flemish Baroque painter
- Peter Francke (1897–1978), German screenwriter
- Peter Frankopan (born 1971), British historian, writer and hotelier
- Peter Freebody (born 1950), Australian academic
- Peter Freed (born 1953), American photographer
- Peter Freuchen (1886–1957), Danish explorer and anthropologist
- Peter Freund (1936–2018), American-Romanian professor of theoretical physicist
- Peter J. Freyd (born 1936), American mathematician
- Peter Friederich, Swiss former diplomat and criminal
- Peter Friese (born 1952), German art historian and curator
- Peter Friz (born 1974), Austrian mathematician
- Peter Frolo, Slovak photographer
- Peter Frost, British writer, photographer and archaeologist
- Peter Wickens Fry (1795–1860), English photographer
- Peter Fuchs (1829–1898), German sculptor
- Peter Fuller (1947–1990), British art critic and magazine editor
- Peter Funke (born 1950), German ancient historian
- Peter Furth, American academic
- Peter Gaddum, expert in silk production
- Peter Gago (born 1957), Australian writer and winemaker
- Peter Galassi (born 1955), American writer, curator, and art historian
- Peter Gallo, American artist
- Peter Gammond (1925–2019), British music critic, writer and artist
- Peter J. Ganci Jr. (c. 1946–2001), American firefighter
- Peter Ganine (1900–1974), Russian-American sculptor
- Peter M. Garner, American abolitionist
- Peter Garnsey (born 1938), Australian historian of the Greco-Roman world
- Peter Garrett (born 1953), Australian musician and activist
- Peter Garthwaite (1909–2001), British conservationist
- Peter Gaszynski (1963–2017), Swedish photographer
- Peter Gatien (born 1952), Canadian club owner and party promoter
- Peter Gay (1923–2015), German-American historian and author
- Peter Geach (1916–2013), British philosopher
- Peter Gedge (1910–1993), Scottish teacher and rugby union player
- Peter Geiger (1942–2025), Lichtenstein historian
- Peter Gelb (born 1953), American arts administrator
- Peter Gemzøe (1811–1879), Danish painter and lithographer
- Peter D. Gerakaris, American interdisciplinary artist
- Peter German, anti-money laundering expert
- Peter Gertner (c. 1495-c. 1541), German painter
- Péter Gervai (born 1972), Hungarian IT development engineer
- Peter Geschwind (1966–2021), Swedish painter
- Peter Ghosh (born 1954), British historian
- Peter Ghyczy (1940–2022), German designer of Hungarian origin
- Peter Leonhard Gianelli (1767–1807), Danish medalist
- Peter Gibb (1954–2011), Australian criminal and prison escapee
- Peter Giblin (born 1943), English mathematician
- Peter B. Gilkey (born 1946), American mathematician
- Peter Gladstone (1928–2000), British naturalist and wildfowl expert
- Peter Glassen (1920–1986), Canadian philosopher
- Peter L. Gluck, American architect
- Peter Godfrey-Smith (born 1965), Australian philosopher and writer
- Peter Godwin (born 1957), Zimbabwean author, journalist and screenwriter
- Peter P. Goelet (1764–1828), American merchant and real estate investor
- Peter Goin (born 1951), American photographer
- Peter Golding, English fashion designer
- Peter Goldsmith, Baron Goldsmith (born 1950), British barrister
- Peter Golfinopoulos (1928–2024), American artist
- Peter Gollwitzer (born 1950), German professor of psychology
- Peter Goodrich, American legal academic
- Peter Goossens, Belgian chef
- Peter Gorschlüter (born 1974), German art historian
- Peter Gotti (1939–2021), American mobster
- Peter Gowan (1946–2009), Scottish professor, activist and author
- Peter Gowland (1916–2010), American glamour photographer and actor
- Peter Aloys Gratz (1769–1849), German schoolmaster and Biblical scholar
- Peter Greenwood (1962–2021), Australian special effects technician
- Peter Gric, Austrian painter, drawer and illustrator
- Peter Grindrod (born 1959), British mathematician and author
- Peter Grippe (1912–2002), American sculptor, printmaker and painter
- Peter Grossman (born 1948), American economist
- Peter Grunauer, Austrian chef
- Peter Gullestad (born 1948), Norwegian civil servant
- Peter Guralnick (born 1943), American screenwriter
- Peter Gurney (1938–2006), British archivist
- Peter Gusenberg (1888–1929), German-American contract killer
- Peter Guttorp, statistician
- Peter Gwynn (1916–1999), British civil servant
- Peter Werner Häberlin (1912–1953), Swiss photographer
- Peter Hacker (born 1939), British philosopher
- Peter Hafftiz, German educator and historiographer
- Peter L. Hagelstein (born 1954), American academic
- Peter Christoph Hagemann (1810–1853), Danish architect
- Peter Hagger (1944–1995), British trade unionist
- Peter Hakim, American economist
- Peter Bacon Hales (1950–2014), American historian, professor, musician and photographer
- Peter Halley (born 1953), American artist
- Peter Halm (1854–1923), German etcher
- Peter Hambly (born 1965), British environmental campaigner and communicator
- Peter Hanenberger (born 1942), German-born automotive specialist
- Peter Hansford, English civil engineer
- Peter Hans, American college system president
- Peter Harkawik (born 1982), American sculptor
- Peter Harlan, German musical instrument maker and luth player
- Peter Harrop (1926–2020), British civil servant
- Peter H. Hassrick (1941–2019), American museum curator
- Peter Heather (born 1960), British historian
- Peter Heathfield (1929–2010), British trade unionist
- Peter Heehs (born 1948), American historian
- Peter Hegedus (born 1976), Hungarian-Australian writer, director and producer
- Peter Helck (1893–1988), American illustrator
- Peter K. Hepler (born 1936), American academic
- Peter Hemingway (1929–1995), British architect
- Peter Henlein (1485–1542), German locksmith and clockmaster
- Peter Hennessy (born 1947), English historian and academic
- Peter Herde (born 1933), German historian
- Peter Herrmann, social philosopher, sociologist and academic
- Peter Hertz (1874–1939), Danish art historian
- Peter Andreas Heuch (1756–1825), Norwegian merchant
- Peter Hibbs (1757–1847), Australian settler
- Peter Hicks (born 1964), British historian and church musician
- Peter Hide, English-born abstract sculptor
- Peter J. Hincks (1883–1968), banker and public official
- Peter Hinwood (born 1946), English antiques dealer and former actor
- Peter Hislop, American mathematician
- Peter Hitchcock (1944–2019), Australian nature conservationist
- Peter Jacob Hjelm (1746–1813), Swedish concert
- Peter Hobson (born 1949), English academic
- Peter Hoeher, German engineer
- Peter James Hoffer (born 1965), Canadian artist
- Peter Høj (born 1957), Danish-Australian academic
- Peter Holden, British doctor
- Peter Holford (1720–1804), English barrister
- Peter Holt (1918–2006), British historian
- Peter Høier Holtermann (1820–1865), Norwegian architect
- Peter Homa, British health service manager
- Peter K. Homer (born 1961), American aerospace engineer
- Peter Honnen, German linguist
- Peter E. Hook (born 1942), American linguist
- Peter Fjeldsted Hoppe (1794–1848), Danish civil servant
- Peter Horbury (1950–2023), British car designer
- Peter Jacob Horemans (1700–1776), Flemish painter
- Peter Housden (born 1950), British civil servant
- Peter Howson (born 1958), Scottish painter and printmaker
- Peter Huang (born 1937), Taiwanese activist
- Peter Hug, Swiss historian
- Peter Hujar (1934–1987), American photographer
- Peter Hurd (1904–1984), American artist
- Peter L. Hurd, Canadian academic
- Peter Hurkos (1911–1988), Dutch ESP medium
- Peter Hutchison (1935–2019), British public official, businessman and botanist
- Peter Hvidt (1916–1986), Danish architect and furniture designer
- Peter Iden (born 1938), German writer and art critic
- Peter Ilsted (1861–1933), Danish printmaker and painter
- Peter Imlay (1797–1881), Australian pioneer settler
- Peter Serracino Inglott (1936–2012), Maltese university professor and rector
- Peter Ingwersen (born 1962), Danish fashion designer
- Peter Isaacson (1920–2017), Australian pilot and publisher
- Peter Iverson (1944–2021), American historian
- Peter John Jaban, disc jockey and human rights campaigner
- Peter Jaffé (1914–2005), Australian philatelist
- Peter Jagers (born 1941), Swedish mathematician and statistician
- Peter Jambrek (born 1940), Slovenian intellectual
- Peter Janesch (born 1953), Hungarian architect
- Peter Janich (1942–2016), German philosopher
- Peter Janson (born 1940), Australian socialite and motor racing driver
- Peter Janssen (1844–1908), German painter
- Peter Jeffery (born 1953), American musicologist
- Peter Joslin (born 1933), British police officer and Deputy lieutenant of Warwickshire
- Peter Jost (1921–2016), British mechanical engineer
- Peter Josyph, American artist, author and filmmaker
- Peter Joyce, English painter
- Peter Jubeck (1936–2003), American restaurateur
- Peter Julian (born 1952), American artist
- Peter Junger (1933–2006), American computer law professor
- Peter Jupp (1940–2006), British historian
- Peter Kaczorowski, American theatrical lighting designer
- Peter Kagayi, Ugandan poet, lawyer and teacher
- Peter Kagwanja (born 1963), Kenyan intellectual
- Peter Kapschutschenko (1915–2006), Ukrainian-American sculptor
- Peter Karmel (1922–2008), Australian economist and education administrator
- Peter Karvaš (1920–1999), Slovak writer, philosopher, theatre scholar, dramaturg, and diplomat
- Peter Kayafas (born 1971), American photographer
- Peter Robert Keil (born 1942), German painter and sculptor
- Peter Kenna (1930–1987), Australian playwright, radio actor and screenwriter
- Peter Kennard (born 1949), English photomontage artist
- Peter Kerrigan (1899–1977), British communism activist
- Peter Kilpatrick, American academic
- Peter Kinley (1926–1988), British artist
- Peter Kinzing (1745–1816), German Mennonite clockmaker
- Peter Klashorst (1957–2024), Dutch painter and photographer
- Peter Klibanoff, American economist
- Peter Klint (born 1971), German painter
- Peter Klusen (born 1951), German writer, translator and cartoonist
- Peter Knobel (1943–2019), American Reform rabbi, educator and editor
- Peter Kogge (born 1946), American computer engineer
- Peter Kolchin (1943–2025), American historian
- Péter Komjáth (born 1953), Hungarian mathematician
- Peter Kopelman (1951–2021), British academic
- Peter Kornbluh, American academic
- Peter Kovál (born 1965), American photographer and artist
- Peter Kowalke (born 1979), American author and unschooling advocate
- Peter Joseph Krahe (1758–1840), German architect
- Peter Krasnow (1886–1979), American painter
- Peter Krausz (born 1946), Canadian artist
- Peter Kravchenko (1921–2009), Ukrainian-Australian artist
- Peter Krečič (born 1947), Slovenian historian
- Peter Kreeft (born 1937), American philosopher
- Peter Kreeft (diver), German inventor and diver
- Peter L. Krider, American silversmith
- Peter Krikes, American screenwriter
- Peter B. Kronheimer, British mathematician
- Peter Kropotkin (1842–1921), anarcho-communist revolutionary and philosopher
- Peter Kruschwitz, German classical scholar
- Peter Kubovsky (1930–2014), Austrian draughtsman and painter
- Peter Kuckei (1938–2023), German painter and stained glass artist
- Peter Kudzinowski (1903–1929), American serial killer
- Peter Kuhfeld, English painter
- Peter Ludwig Kühnen (1812–1877), German painter
- Peter Kulka (1937–2024), German architect
- Peter Kump (1937–1995), American chef
- Peter Kuper (born 1958), American alternative comics artist and illustrator
- Peter Kurer (born 1949), Swiss manager and lawyer
- Peter Kürten (1883–1931), German serial killer and rapist
- Peter Kyberd, Canadian engineer
- Peter Shand Kydd (1925–2006), stepfather of Diana, Princess of Wales
- Peter Ladefoged (1925–2006), British phonetician
- Peter Lamarque (born 1948), British philosopher
- Peter Lambeck (1628–1680), German historian and librarian
- Peter Spendelowe Lamborn (c. 1722–1774), English painter
- Peter Lancaster (born 1929), Canadian mathematician
- Peter Lando, set decorator and art director
- Peter Landrock (born 1948), Danish cryptographer and mathematician
- Peter Landweber (born 1940), American mathematician
- Peter Langston (born 1946), American computer programmer
- Peter Lantos, British scientist and author
- Peter Lanyon (1918–1964), English painter
- Peter Lasersohn, American linguist and academic
- Peter Lasko (1924–2003), British art historian
- Peter Laslett (1915–2001), English historian
- Peter Lassen (1800–1859), American rancher and prospector
- Peter Laszlo Peri (1899–1967), Hungarian sculptor
- Peter LaTempa (1904–1945), American mobster
- Peter Laverty (1926–2013), British painter
- Peter Lawrenson (1933–2017), British electrical engineer
- Peter Lax (1926–2025), Hungarian-born American mathematician
- Peter Lazarov (born 1958), Bulgarian-Dutch artist printmaker
- Peter Lebeck (died 1837), American settler
- Peter Ledger (1945–1994), Australian cartoonist, artist and illustrator
- Peter Leeson (born 1979), American economist
- Peter Leibing (1941–2008), German photographer
- Peter Leibinger (born 1967), German mechanical engineer
- Peter Gustav Lejeune Dirichlet (1805–1859), German mathematician
- Peter Lely (1618–1680), Dutch painter
- Peter Lenk (born 1947), German sculptor
- Peter Joseph Lenné (1789–1866), Prussian gardener and landscape architect
- Peter J. Liacouras (1931–2016), American academic
- Peter B. Licata, American educator
- Peter Licavoli (1902–1984), American mobster
- Peter Liddle (born 1934), British historian
- Peter Liddle (artist) (born 1940), British landscape artist and sculptor
- Peter Liem, American wine critic
- Peter Lienhardt (1928–1986), British social anthropologist
- Peter Lik, Australian photographer
- Peter Likins (born 1936), American academic administrator
- Peter Lindbergh (1944–2019), German photographer and film director
- Peter Linde (born 1946), Swedish sculptor
- Peter Linebaugh, American Marxist historian
- Peter Linehan (1943–2020), British historian
- Peter Ling (1926–2006), British television, radio and comic strip author
- Peter J. Linhoff, American architect
- Peter Lipton (1954–2007), American philosopher
- Peter Litherland, British watchmaker
- Peter Littelmann, German mathematician
- Peter Liversidge, British artist
- Peter Loboda (born 1949), museum founder
- Peter A. Loeb (1937–2024), American mathematician
- Peter Oliver Loew (born 1967), German historian, translator and scholar
- Peter Loewenberg, American historian and psychoanalyst
- Peter Löscher (born 1957), Austrian manager
- Peter Longerich (born 1955), German professor of history
- Peter Lorange (born 1943), Norwegian economist
- Peter Lord, British art historian
- Peter Ludwigs (1888–1943), German sculptor and painter
- Peter Luff, British campaigner
- Peter Luger, German chef and restaurateur
- Peter Hope Lumley (1920–2004), English model agent and public relations consultant
- Peter Lundin (born 1972), Danish serial killer
- Peter Lupus (born 1932), American bodybuilder and actor
- Peter Lynn, New Zealand kite maker
- Peter Macchiarini (1909–2001), American sculptor
- Peter MacGill, American gallerist
- Peter K. Machamer (1942–2023), American philosopher
- Peter Machinist, American historian
- Peter MacKinnon, Canadian academic
- Peter Mackridge (1946–2022), British philologist and academic
- Peter Stewart Macliver (1822–1891), Scottish journalist and politician
- Peter Macnab, Scottish architect
- Peter Maddison, Australian architect and television presenter
- Peter Magubane (1932–2024), South African photographer
- Peter Malkin (1927–2005), Israeli civil servant
- Peter Jacob Maltz (born 1973), Israeli artist
- Peter C. Mancall (born 1959), American historian
- Peter Mandaville (born 1971), American academic and former government official
- Peter Mandl, Swedish sculptor
- Peter Mandler (born 1958), British historian
- Peter Mangs (born 1972), Swedish serial killer
- Peter Manifold (1817–1885), English pastoralist and politician
- Peter Mansfield (1928–1996), British journalist
- Peter Manuel (1927–1958), American-Scottish serial killer
- Peter Jan Margry (born 1956), Dutch historian and European ethnologist
- Peter Marino (born 1949), American architect
- Peter Markey, English toy maker
- Peter Marksman (1815–1892), Native American Methodist minister and Ojibwe leader
- Peter Marralwanga (1916–1987), Australian Aboriginal painter
- Peter Marvey (born 1971), Swiss illusionist
- Peter Masak (1957–2004), Canadian-American engineer, inventor and glider pilot
- Peter Maser (born 1943), German Protestant church historian
- Peter Massie (1767–1840), Scottish planter
- Peter Mathias (1928–2016), British historian
- Peter Mathiesen (1696–1768), Danish clockmaker
- Peter Hugoe Matthews (1934–2023), British linguist
- Peter Mattis, American computer programmer and entrepreneur
- Peter Mauzey (born 1930), American electronic music professor and engineer
- Peter Max (1937–2026), Jewish German-born American illustrator and graphic artist
- Peter John Mayo (1944–2004), English Slavist researcher
- Peter Mazell (1733–1808), Irish painter and engraver
- Peter Mbithi (born 1956), Kenyan academic and veterinarian
- Peter McBride Jr. (1974–1992), Irish murder victim
- Peter McCleary (born 1938), American scholar
- Peter Dodds McCormick (1833–1916), Australian schoolteacher and songwriter
- Peter Donovan McEntee (1920–2002), British colonial administrator and diplomat
- Peter McGregor (1947–2008), Australian anarchist
- Peter J. McGuire (1852–1906), American labor leader
- Peter McKintosh, British theatre set and costume designer
- Peter McLaren (born 1948), Canadian scholar
- Peter McLaughlin, Irish historian and education manager
- Peter McLeavey (1936–2015), New Zealand art dealer
- Peter McLoone, Irish trade union leader
- Peter McMullen (born 1942), British mathematician
- Peter McSkimming (1848–1923), New Zealand grocer, gold miner, brick and pipe manufacturer
- Peter McWilliams (1949–2000), American author and activist
- Peter Megaw (1910–2006), Irish architectural historian and archaeologist
- Peter Meineck (born 1967), American theatre director and academic
- Peter Melvin (1933–2009), English architect
- Peter Mendelsund, American book designer
- Peter Menefee, American costume designer
- Peter Menne, German painter
- Peter Mennim (born 1955), British artist based in Cambridge
- Peter Merriman, American chef
- Peter Merriman (geographer), British geographer and professor
- Peter Meutas, English courtier and soldier
- Peter Meyn (1749–1808), Danish architect
- Peter Michel (born 1938), German art scholar
- Peter Smith Michie (1839–1901), American soldier, Army engineer, and military educator
- Peter Milano (1925–2012), American mobster
- Peter Millican (born 1958), British philosopher and chess player
- Peter Minshall (born 1941), Trinidadian artist
- Peter Missing (born 1953), American artist
- Peter Molitor (1821–1898), German painter
- Peter Mærsk Møller (1836–1927), Danish sea captain
- Peter Mollica, American artist
- Peter Molydeux, Twitter parody account
- Peter Molyneux (born 1959), English video game designer and game programmer
- Peter Monamy (1681–1749), English painter
- Peter Mondavi (1914–2016), American winemaker
- Peter Monge, American academic
- Peter Montagna (born 1952), American make-up artist
- Peter Monteath, Australian historian and academic
- Peter Monteverdi (1934–1999), Swiss engineer
- Peter Moog (1871–1930), German painter
- Peter Moraw (1935–2013), German historian
- Peter Morici (born 1948), American economist
- Peter Moskos (born 1971), American academic
- Peter Moss (1938–2017), British colonial administrator and conservationist
- Peter Moyes (1917–2007), Australian headmaster and education administrator
- Peter Mui (1953–2009), Chinese-American fashion designer
- Peter Mullins, British art director
- Peter Mundy, British merchant trader, travelled and writer
- Peter Munz (1921–2006), New Zealand academic
- Peter Murton (1924–2009), British film designer
- Peter Muserlian (born 1956), American developer
- Peter Musñgi (born 1945), Filipino broadcast journalist, voice over artist and radio DJ
- Peter Mwangi, Kenyan accountant, engineer and business executive
- Peter Nadin, American artist and farmer
- Peter Nahum (born 1947), British art dealer and television personality
- Peter Naudé (born 1952), British business theorist
- Peter Navarre, early settler of the Maumee valley
- Peter Navarro (born 1949), American economist and author
- Peter Nchabeleng (1928–1986), South African activist
- Peter Johansen Neergaard (1769–1835), Danish landowner
- Peter Nemenyi (1927–2002), American mathematician
- Peter Johann Nepomuk Geiger (1805–1880), Austrian artist
- Peter Neptune (born 1956), American wine expert and educator
- Peter Neumair (died 2021), Italian murder victim
- Peter Newsam (1928–2023), British educationist
- Peter Newsome, British artist
- Peter Nicholl, New Zealand economist
- Peter Niers (c. 1540–1581), German serial killer
- Peter Nigrini, American projection designer
- Peter Nijkamp (born 1946), Dutch economist
- Peter Nikoll, German gangster
- Peter Noever (born 1941), Austrian designer
- Peter Norman (born 1958), Swedish economist and politician
- Peter K. Norquest (born 1971), American linguist
- Peter Novick (1934–2012), American historian
- Peter Noyes (academic administrator), British academic
- Peter Nwangwu, Nigerian academic
- Peter Oberlander (1922–2008), Canadian architect
- Peter W. Ochs, American academic
- Peter Olfert, Canadian trade unionist
- Peter Oliphant (1950–2023), American actor and video game designer
- Peter Olley (born 1942), British artist
- Peter S. Onuf (born 1946), American historian and professor
- Peter Onumanyi, Nigerian mathematician
- Peter Oosterhuis (1948–2024), English golfer and broadcaster
- Peter Opsvik (1939–2024), Norwegian interior designer
- Peter Orlik (born 1938), American mathematician
- Peter Orno, fictitious American mathematician
- Peter R. Orszag (born 1968), American economist
- Peter Oskam (born 1960), Dutch politician, judge and football referee
- Peter Østbye (1855–1943), Norwegian philologist and translator
- Peter Ozsváth (born 1967), American mathematician
- Peter Pagé (1939–2020), German software pioneer
- Peter Paillou (the younger) (1757–1831), English painter
- Peter Paillou (1720–1790), English painter
- Peter Pakesch, Austrian exhibition curator, museum director and foundation director
- Peter Palandjian (born 1964), Armenian-American businessman and tennis player
- Peter Palchinsky (1875–1929), Russian engineer
- Péter Pál Pálfy (born 1955), Hungarian mathematician
- Peter Paliatka (born 1952), Slovak educator and sculptor
- Peter E. Palmquist (1936–2003), American photography historian
- Peter Paret (1924–2020), German-born American historian
- Peter Parler, 14th-century German architect and sculptor
- Peter J. Parsons (1936–2022), British classicist and papyrologist
- Peter Partner (1924–2015), British historian
- Peter Pedroni, American econometrician and professor
- Peter Pál Pelbart (born 1956), Hungarian-born Brazilian philosopher and essayist
- Peter Pelham, 17th-century English painter and engraver
- Peter Peltz (1915–2001), American artist
- Peter Pennoyer (born 1957), American architect
- Peter Perchard, British goldsmith and merchant
- Peter C. Perdue (born 1949), American historian
- Peter Peregrinus of Maricourt, 13th century French scholar and magnetism experimenter
- Peter Peri, British artist
- Peter Perkins (1739–1813), American planter, patriot and politician
- Peter Adolf Persson (1862–1914), Swedish painter
- Peter Peryer (1941–2018), New Zealand photographer
- Peter S. Pezzati (1902–1993), American portrait artist
- Peter Philippi (1866–1945), German portrait painter
- Peter Piel (1835–1904), German music pioneer
- Peter Pinkerton (1870–1930), Scottish mathematician
- Peter Pinkney (born 1956), British trade unionist
- Peter J. Pirie, English musicologist and critic
- Peter Pitseolak (1902–1973), Inuk photographer, sculptor, artist and historian
- Peter Plouviez (1931–2017), British trade union leader
- Péter Pócs (born 1950), Hungarian graphic designer and poster artist
- Peter Poellner, German philosopher
- Peter Pond (1739–c. 1807), American explorer, cartographer, merchant and soldier
- Peter Potemkine (1886–1926), Russian Empire chess master
- Peter Powning, Canadian artist and sculptor
- Peter Praet (born 1949), Belgian economist
- Peter Prodromou (born 1969), Greek-Cypriot aerodynamicist and engineer
- Peter Proksch (1935–2012), Austrian artist
- Peter G. J. Pulzer (1929–2023), British historian
- Peter Qasim (born 1974), Indian-born immigration detainee
- Peter Quartey, Ghanaian development economist
- Peter Raadsig (1806–1882), Danish painter
- Peter Rachleff, American historian
- Peter Rachman (1919–1962), Polish property mogul
- Peter Raedts (1948–2021), Dutch historian
- Peter Railton (born 1950), American philosopher
- Peter Ramsay (1939–2019), New Zealand academic
- Peter Randall-Page (born 1954), British artist and sculptor
- Peter Alan Rayner (1924–2007), British numismatist
- Peter Redmond (roboticist), Irish robotics engineer and special effects technician
- Peter Redmond, Irish-born merchant in Portugal and Jacobite
- Peter Reginato (born 1945), American sculptor and painter
- Peter H. Reill (1938–2019), American historian
- Peter Reinhart, American baker, educator and author
- Peter Reuter (born 1944), American criminologist and economist
- Peter Revers, German-Austrian musicologist and university teacher
- Peter Rheinstein (born 1943), American physician and lawyer
- Peter Richerson (born 1943), American biologist
- Peter Richtarik, Slovak mathematician
- Peter Riegel, American research engineer
- Peter Righton (1926–2007), British child protection expert, social care worker and child molester
- Peter J. Rimmer, English-born economic and human geographer
- Peter Rindisbacher (1806–1834), Swiss artist
- Peter Rivière, British social anthropologist
- Peter Robb-King, English make-up artist
- Peter Rockwell (1936–2020), American sculptor
- Peter Roderigo, Dutch pirate, privateer and soldier
- Peter Roehr (1944–1968), German Pop Art minimalist artist
- Peter Roemer, American engineer
- Peter Rohs (born 1936), German philosopher
- Peter Romney (1743–1777), English painter
- Peter Ronson (1934–2007), Icelandic athlete and actor
- Peter Roquette (1927–2023), German mathematician
- Peter Rosenthal (1941–2024), Canadian mathematician and lawyer
- Peter Rothe (born 1935), German art director
- Peter F. Rothermel (1812–1895), American painter
- Peter Rousseeuw (born 1956), Belgian statistician
- P. M. Røwde, Norwegian rubber magnate
- Peter Rubino (born 1947), American master sculptor
- Peter Rüchel (1937–2019), German music journalist, producer and founder of Rockpalast
- Peter Russell-Clarke (1935–2025), Australian chef, writer and illustrator
- Peter Rutkoff, American academic
- Peter Ryom (born 1937), Danish musicologist
- Peter M. Sacks (born 1950), South African painter
- P. Y. Saeki (1871–1965), Japanese scholar
- Peter Sahlins (born 1957), American historian
- Peter Salamon, American mathematician
- Peter Salentine (1829–1884), American hardware dealer and politician
- Peter Salovey (born 1958), American social psychologist and former academic administrator
- Peter Salter (born 1947), British architectural designer and academic
- Peter H. Salus, American linguist and computer historian/advocate
- Peter Salway (born 1932), British historian
- Peter J. Salzman, American computer hacker
- Peter V. Sampo (1931–2020), American college president
- Peter Samson (born 1941), American computer programmer
- Peter Sandborn, Fellow of the Institute of Electrical and Electronics Engineers
- Peter Sarnak (born 1953), South African mathematician
- Peter A. Sarpy (c. 1804–1865), French-American owner
- Peter Sarris, British historian
- Peter Saul (born 1934), American painter
- Peter Sawatzky (born 1951), Canadian sculptor
- Peter Sawyer (criminal), American thief and robber
- Peter Sawyer (historian) (1928–2018), British historian
- Peter Sceats, British businessman and political activist
- Peter Scheemakers (1691–1781), Flemish sculptor
- Peter Schiff (born 1963), stock broker, financial commentator, and radio personality
- Peter Olrog Schjøtt (1833–1926), Norwegian philologist and politician
- Peter Schlesinger (born 1948), American sculptor
- Peter Schöffer (c. 1425–c. 1503), early German printer
- Peter Scholze (born 1987), German mathematician
- Peter K. Schott, American economist
- Peter Alfred Schou (1844–1914), Danish painter
- Peter Schrank (born 1952), political cartoonist
- Peter Schreyer (born 1953), German automobile designer
- Peter Schrijver (born 1963), Dutch linguist
- Peter Schuyff (born 1958), American painter
- Peter Schweri (1939–2016), Swiss artist, painter, illustrator, photographer and music composer
- Peter Schwickerath (born 1942), German sculptor
- Peter Schwingen (1813–1863), German painter
- Peter Scoones (1937–2014), underwater cameraman
- Peter Scully (born 1963), Australian criminal
- Peter Sedgley (1930–2025), English artist
- Peter Seidman, American lecturer, educator and talent scout
- Peter Seitz (1931–2023), German graphic designer
- Peter Sekaer (1901–1950), Danish photographer and artist
- Peter Selz (1919–2019), German-born American art historian
- Peter Serwan (born 1962), Australian artist
- Peter Settelen (born 1951), British actor and voice coach
- Peter Shalen (born 1946), American mathematician
- Peter Shankman (born 1972), American entrepreneur and author
- Peter Shepheard (1913–2002), British architect
- Peter Shergold (born 1946), Australian academic and public servant
- Peter Sherlock (born 1972), Australian vice-chancellor and historian
- Peter Sherwood (born 1948), British professor of linguistics
- Peter M. A. Sherwood, American educator
- Peter Shire (born 1947), American artist
- Peter Shor (born 1959), American mathematician
- Peter Shorrocks (1834–1886), British trade union leader
- Peter Sichel (1922–2025), German-American wine merchant
- Peter Siddell (1935–2011), New Zealand painter
- Peter Silver, American historian
- Peter Simone (1945–2025), American organized crime figure
- Peter Sinfield (1943–2024), English poet, songwriter, and founding member of British rock band King Crimson
- Peter James Sisam (1914–2015), English photographer and film director
- Peter Skalicky (born 1941), Austrian academic
- Peter Skewes, American professor
- Peter Skrine (1935–2017), British Germanist and academic
- Peter Slodowy (1948–2002), German mathematician
- Peter Sloss, Scottish meteorologist and broadcaster
- Peter Sloterdijk (born 1947), German philosopher
- Peter Smagorinsky, American academic
- Peter Snayers (1592–1667), Flemish painter
- Peter Snowdon, British historian and journalist
- Peter Som (born 1970), Chinese-American fashion designer
- Peter Sorel (born 1938), American photographer
- Peter Soriano (born 1959), French-American artist
- Peter Sparling, American dancer and academic
- Peter Speeth (1772–1831), German architect
- Peter Speliopoulos, American fashion designer
- Peter Spufford (1934–2017), British historian and academic
- Peter Stachura (born 1944), British historian
- Peter Francis Stager, American Capitol rioter
- Peter Stanley (born 1956), Australian historian
- Peter W. Stanley (born 1940), President of Pomona College
- Peter J. Stanlis (1919–2011), American academic
- Peter Stansky (born 1932), American historian
- Peter Stanton (born 1940), Australian landscape ecologist and biogeographer
- Peter Startup, British sculptor
- Peter Stearns (born 1936), American historian
- Peter Stebbing (1914–1991), British painter
- Peter Štefan (1941–1978), Slovak mathematician
- Peter Steinberger (born 1986), Austrian computer programmer
- Peter Stephan (born 1963), German mechanical engineer and professor
- Peter Steudtner (1971), German human rights activist and documentary film maker
- Peter Štih (born 1960), Slovenian historian
- Peter Stoica (born 1949), Swedish academic
- Peter Stoicheff (born 1956), Canadian academic
- Peter Stoner (1888–1980), American mathematician
- Peter Strausfeld (1910–1980), German-British artist
- P. F. Strawson (1919–2006), English philosopher
- Peter Edward Stroehling (1768–c. 1826), German painter
- Peter Strudel (1660–1714), Austrian artist
- Peter Struve (1870–1944), Russian political economist and philosopher
- Peter Struycken (born 1939), Dutch visual artist
- Peter Stutchbury (born 1954), Australian architect
- Peter Suber (born 1951), American philosopher and open access advocate
- Peter Sugar (1919–1999), American historian
- Peter Frederik Suhm (1728–1798), Danish historian
- Peter B. Sunderland, American engineer and academic
- Peter Cormac Sutherland (1822–1900), British explorer
- Peter Swales (1948–2022), Welsh historian
- Peter Swerling (1929–2000), American radar theoretician
- Peter Swinnerton-Dyer (1927–2018), British mathematician
- Peter Swire (born 1958), American academic
- Peter Ludvig Sylow (1832–1918), Norwegian mathematician
- Peter Sylvester (1937–2007), German painter
- Peter Symonds (c. 1528–1586/87), British merchant
- Peter Szendy (born 1966), French philosopher and musicologist
- Péter Szondi (1929–1971), German academic
- Péter Szőr (1970–2013), Hungarian computer virus and security researcher, entrepreneur and author
- Peter Szüsz (1924–2008), Hungarian-American Jewish mathematician
- Peter Tabichi (born 1982), Kenyan teacher and Franciscan friar
- Peter Tábori (1940–2023), Anglo-Hungarian architect
- Peter Takirambudde, Ugandan activist
- Peter Taltavull (c. 1825–1881), Lincoln-conspirators trial witness and French horn player
- Peter Tamony (1902–1985), American folk-etymologist
- Peter Tatchell (born 1952), Australian-born British human rights campaigner
- Peter Teichner (born 1963), German mathematician
- Peter Tevenan (1857–1943), Irish-British trade unionist and politician
- Peter Tham (born 1948), Singaporean fraudster
- Peter Thielke (born 1968), American philosophical historian
- Peter Thielst (born 1951), Danish philosopher
- Peter Thomann (born 1940), German photographer
- Peter Thornton (1925–2007), British art historian and writer
- Peter L. Thorslev Jr. (1929–2011), American historian
- Peter Olai Thorvik (1873–1965), Norwegian blacksmith, fisherman, banker and politician
- Peter Thumb (1681–1766), Austrian architect
- Peter Tillemans (1684–1734), Flemish painter
- Peter A .Tinsley (born c. 1939), American Economist
- Peter Tobin (1946–2022), Scottish serial killer
- Peter Todd (born 1962), Canadian professor and academic administrator
- Peter Todd (programmer), Canadian software developer
- Peter Tom-Petersen (1861–1926), Danish painter and graphic artist
- Peter Tomory (1922–2008), British art historian, museum curator and academic
- Peter Lanchene Toobu (born 1968), Ghanaian politician
- Peter Topping (born 1971), British mathematician
- Peter Toyne (born 1939), university vice-chancellor
- Peter Trapa, American mathematician
- Peter Trawny (born 1964), German philosopher
- Peter Tregear, Australian musicologist
- Peter Trethewey (born 1935), Australian cricketer and businessman
- Peter Trowbridge, American landscape architect
- Peter Petrovich Troyanskii (1894–1950), Russian scholar
- Peter Trudgill (born 1943), English sociolinguist
- Peter Truong, convicted child sexual abuser
- Peter Trusler (born 1954), Australian artist
- Peter Tsiamalili (c. 1952–2007), Papua New Guinean civil servant
- Peter Tuchman (born 1958), American stock trader
- Peter Turchin (born 1957), American quantitative historian
- Peter Turnerelli (c. 1771–1839), Irish-born sculptor
- Peter Turnley (born 1955), American-French photographer
- Péter Tusor, Hungarian historian
- Peter Pierre Tutein (1726–1799), German-Danish merchant and industrialist
- Peter Ucko (1938–2007), English archaeologist
- Peter Udell (born 1934), American lyricist and writer
- Peter Christian Uldahl (1778–1820), Danish piano maker
- Peter Unger (born 1942), American philosopher
- Peter Vaill (1936–2020), American academic
- Peter Vallentyne (born 1952), American philosopher
- Peter van Agtmael (born 1981), American photographer
- Peter G. Van Alst (1828–1900), American surveyor, engineer and commissioner
- Peter van Bleeck (1697–1764), Dutch painter
- Peter van Bohlen (1796–1840), German orientalist and indologist
- Peter van de Velde (1634–after 1723), Flemish marine painter
- Peter van der Linden (born 1963), American technologist and author
- Peter van der Veer (born 1953), Dutch academic
- Peter van der Voort (born 1964), Dutch physician and politician
- Peter Van Dievoet (c. 1661–1729), Flemish sculptor and ornamental designer
- Peter van Dijk (1929–2019), American architect
- Peter Van Gheluwe (born 1957), Belgian artist
- Peter van Halen (1612–1687), Flemish painter
- Peter van Hurk (c. 1697–1775), Dutch-Danish merchant
- Peter van Inwagen (born 1942), American philosopher
- Peter van Kessel (born 1933), Dutch historian
- Peter van Onselen (born 1976), Australian political academic
- Peter van Tour (born 1966), Dutch musicologist, music historian and music theorist
- Peter Vanderbank (1649–1697), French-English engraver
- Peter Vandyke (1729 – c. 1800), Dutch painter
- Péter Varjú (born 1982), Hungarian mathematician
- Peter Venables (1923–2017), British psychologist
- Peter Verigin (1859–1924), Russian philosopher
- Peter Verpoorten (died 1659), Italian artist
- Peter Vetsch (born 1943), Swiss architect
- Péter Virágvölgyi (1948–1998), Hungarian typographer, calligrapher and graphic designer
- Peter J. Vita (1910–2004), American barber
- Peter von Bemmel (1686–1754), German artist
- Peter von Bitter, Canadian academic
- Peter von Cornelius (1783–1867), German painter
- Peter von Hess (1792–1871), German painter
- Peter Clodt von Jürgensburg (1805–1867), Russian sculptor
- Peter von Uslar (1816-1875), Russian linguist, general and engineer
- Peter Voulkos (1924–2002), American artist
- Peter Vowell (died 1654), English schoolteacher and Royalist
- Peter Waals (1870–1937), Dutch cabinet maker
- Peter Wackernagel (1897–1981), German musicologist and librarian
- Peter Waddington (1947–2018), British police officer and academic
- Peter Wade (born 1957), British anthropologist
- Peter Wang (2002–2018), one of the 17 victims who was killed in the Stoneman Douglas High School shooting
- Peter Waters (1930–2003), former Conservation Officer at the Library of Congress
- Peter Watkins (born 1959), British civil servant
- Peter Way (born 1957), American historian
- Peter Weibel (1944–2023), Austrian artist
- Peter Weidenbaum (born 1968), Belgian artist
- Peter Weinberger (1956–1956), American infant murdered in a ransom kidnapping
- Peter Wende (1936–2017), German historian and professor
- Peter Wenz (born 1945), American philosopher
- Peter Wesley-Smith (born 1945), Australian legal scholar and opera librettist
- Peter Westerstrøm (1779–1809), Swedish mass murderer
- Peter Wexler (1923–2002), British scholar
- Peter Turner Winskill (1834–1912), English temperance reformer and historian
- Peter C. Whybrow (born 1939), English psychiatrist and author
- Peter Wicke, German musicologist
- Peter Wienk (1920–2010), Dutch illustrator and painter
- Peter Wiernik (1865–1936), American historian
- Peter Wiesinger (1938–2023), Austrian philologist
- Peter J. Wild (born 1939), Swiss electronics engineer and inventor
- Peter Wild (1940–2009), American poet and historian
- Peter Wiles (1919–1997), British economist
- Peter Wilkins (born 1968), British visual artist
- Peter Willcox (born 1953), American sea captain
- Peter Winch (1926–1997), British philosopher
- Peter Winkler, American mathematician
- Peter Winn (born 1942), American historian
- Peter Winter (c. 1941 – c. 2018), German stamp forger
- Peter Winterburn (died 2019), Canadian academic
- Peter Wollny (born 1961), German musicologist
- Peter Womersley (1923–1993), British architect
- Peter Woodcock (1939–2010), Canadian serial killer, rapist, and necrophile
- Peter Woodman (1943–2017), Irish archaeologist
- Peter Worsley (1924–2013), British sociologist and anthropologist
- Peter Wroth (1929–1991), British civil engineer
- Peter Wynn (1931–2017), English mathematician
- Peter Wynne-Thomas (1934–2021), English cricket historian
- Peter Wyon (1767–1822), English engraver
- Peter Yeadon (born 1965), American architect
- Peter Ykens (1648–1695), Flemish painter
- Peter Zalmayev (born 1976), Ukrainian director of the Eurasia Democracy Initiative
- Peter Wessel Zapffe (1899–1990), Norwegian philosopher
- Peter Zemsky, American-French academic
- Peter Zimmermann (born 1956), German painter and sculptor
- Peter Zizka (born 1961), German designer and conceptual artist
- Peter Zumthor (born 1943), Swiss architect

== Disambiguation ==
- Peter Adam, multiple people
- Peter Adams, multiple people
- Peter Adamson, multiple people
- Peter Aitchison, multiple people
- Peter Alberti, multiple people
- Peter Alexander, multiple people
- Peter Allan, multiple people
- Peter Allen, multiple people
- Peter Anders, multiple people
- Peter Andersen, multiple people
- Peter Anderson, multiple people
- Peter Andersson, multiple people
- Peter Andrews, multiple people
- Peter Anker, multiple people
- Peter Appel, multiple people
- Peter Arbo, multiple people
- Peter Archer, multiple people
- Peter Armitage, multiple people
- Peter Armstrong, multiple people
- Peter Arnold, multiple people
- Peter Ashton, multiple people
- Peter Atherton, multiple people
- Peter Austin, multiple people
- Peter Bailey, multiple people
- Peter Bainbridge, multiple people
- Peter Baines, multiple people
- Peter Baker, multiple people
- Péter Bakonyi, multiple people
- Peter Baláž, multiple people
- Péter Balázs, multiple people
- Peter Baldwin, multiple people
- Peter Ball, multiple people
- Peter Bang, multiple people
- Peter Barber, multiple people
- Peter Barker, multiple people
- Peter Barlow, multiple people
- Peter Barnes, multiple people
- Peter Barrett, multiple people
- Peter Barron, multiple people
- Peter Barry, multiple people
- Peter Bartlett, multiple people
- Peter Barton, multiple people
- Peter Bastiansen, multiple people
- Peter Bathurst, multiple people
- Peter Bauer, multiple people
- Peter Baumann, multiple people
- Peter Baumgartner, multiple people
- Peter Baxter, multiple people
- Peter Bayley, multiple people
- Peter Beale, multiple people
- Peter Beard, multiple people
- Peter Beaumont, multiple people
- Peter Beck, multiple people
- Peter Becker, multiple people
- Peter Beckford, multiple people
- Peter Beer, multiple people
- Péter Beke, multiple people
- Peter Behrens, multiple people
- Peter Bell, multiple people
- Peter Bennett, multiple people
- Peter Benson, multiple people
- Peter Bentley, multiple people
- Peter Berger, multiple people
- Peter Bergman, multiple people
- Peter Bernstein, multiple people
- Peter Berry, multiple people
- Peter Best, multiple people
- Peter Beyer, multiple people
- Peter Bieri, multiple people
- Peter Biggs, multiple people
- Peter Birch, multiple people
- Peter Bird, multiple people
- Péter Bíró, multiple people
- Peter Bishop, multiple people
- Peter Blackburn, multiple people
- Peter Blackmore, multiple people
- Peter Blair, multiple people
- Peter Blake, multiple people
- Peter Blayney, multiple people
- Peter Block, multiple people
- Peter Bloomfield, multiple people
- Peter Bøckman, multiple people
- Peter Bogner, multiple people
- Peter Bol, multiple people
- Peter Booth, multiple people
- Peter Boros, multiple people
- Peter Borst, multiple people
- Peter Bourke, multiple people
- Peter Bowers, multiple people
- Peter Bowler, multiple people
- Peter Boyle, multiple people
- Peter Boxall, multiple people
- Peter Bradley, multiple people
- Peter Brady, multiple people
- Peter Bramley, multiple people
- Peter Brand, multiple people
- Peter Braun, multiple people
- Peter Breen, multiple people
- Peter Brennan, multiple people
- Peter Bridges, multiple people
- Peter Briggs, multiple people
- Peter Broadbent, multiple people
- Peter Brock, multiple people
- Peter Brockman, multiple people
- Peter Brodie, multiple people
- Peter Brook, multiple people
- Peter Brooke, multiple people
- Peter Brooks, multiple people
- Peter Brown, multiple people
- Peter Browne, multiple people
- Peter Bryant, multiple people
- Peter Buchanan, multiple people
- Peter Buchholz, multiple people
- Peter Buck, multiple people
- Peter Buckley, multiple people
- Peter Buehning, multiple people
- Peter Bullock, multiple people
- Peter Burge, multiple people
- Peter Burke, multiple people
- Peter Burling, multiple people
- Peter Burns, multiple people
- Peter Burrell, multiple people
- Peter Bush, multiple people
- Peter Butler, multiple people
- Peter Byers, multiple people
- Peter Byrne, multiple people
- Peter Cain, multiple people
- Peter Cannon, multiple people
- Peter Cameron, multiple people
- Peter Campbell, multiple people
- Peter Campion, multiple people
- Peter Carey, multiple people
- Peter Carew, multiple people
- Peter Carlesimo, multiple people
- Peter Carmichael, multiple people
- Peter Carr, multiple people
- Peter Carroll, multiple people
- Peter Carruthers, multiple people
- Peter Carson, multiple people
- Peter Carter, multiple people
- Peter Cartwright, multiple people
- Peter Casey, multiple people
- Peter Harboe Castberg, multiple people
- Peter Caulfield, multiple people
- Peter Cazalet, multiple people
- Peter Chadwick, multiple people
- Peter Chamberlen, multiple people
- Peter Chambers, multiple people
- Peter Chan, multiple people
- Peter Chandler, multiple people
- Peter Chang, multiple people
- Peter Chapman, multiple people
- Peter Cheung, multiple people
- Peter Chiarelli, multiple people
- Peter Chiswell, multiple people
- Peter Chong, multiple people
- Peter Christensen, multiple people
- Peter Christian, multiple people
- Peter Christiansen, multiple people
- Peter Christopher, multiple people
- Peter Chung, multiple people
- Peter Clark, multiple people
- Peter Clarke, multiple people
- Peter Clement, multiple people
- Peter Clifford, multiple people
- Peter Clinch, multiple people
- Peter Cochran, multiple people
- Peter Cochrane, multiple people
- Peter Coffin, multiple people
- Peter Cohen, multiple people
- Peter Coleman, multiple people
- Peter Collett, multiple people
- Peter Collier, multiple people
- Peter Collins, multiple people
- Peter Collinson, multiple people
- Peter Colston, multiple people
- Peter Conacher, multiple people
- Peter Connell, multiple people
- Peter Connelly, multiple people
- Peter Connolly, multiple people
- Peter Connor, multiple people
- Peter Conrad, multiple people
- Peter Cook, multiple people
- Peter Cooke, multiple people
- Peter Cooper, multiple people
- Peter Corbett, multiple people
- Peter Cornelius, multiple people
- Peter Cornell, multiple people
- Peter Corney, multiple people
- Peter Cornwell, multiple people
- Peter Costa, multiple people
- Peter Costello, multiple people
- Peter Courtenay, multiple people
- Peter Courtney, multiple people
- Peter Cowan, multiple people
- Peter Cox, multiple people
- Peter Coyne, multiple people
- Peter Crampton, multiple people
- Peter Crawford, multiple people
- Peter Crawley, multiple people
- Peter Cresswell, multiple people
- Peter Croft, multiple people
- Peter Crook, multiple people
- Peter Crosby, multiple people
- Peter Cross, multiple people
- Peter Crowley, multiple people
- Peter Cuddon, multiple people
- Peter Cullen, multiple people
- Peter Cummings, multiple people
- Peter Cunningham, multiple people
- Peter Curran, multiple people
- Peter Currie, multiple people
- Peter Curtis, multiple people
- Peter Cusack, multiple people
- Peter Dahl, multiple people
- Peter Dailey, multiple people
- Peter Dale, multiple people
- Peter Daly, multiple people
- Peter Daniel, multiple people
- Peter Daniels, multiple people
- Peter Davidson, multiple people
- Peter Davies, multiple people
- Peter Davis, multiple people
- Peter Davison, multiple people
- Peter Dawkins, multiple people
- Peter Dawson, multiple people
- Peter Day, multiple people
- Peter de Lange, multiple people
- Peter de Vries, multiple people
- Peter Deakin, multiple people
- Peter Dean, multiple people
- Peter Delaney, multiple people
- Peter Delmé, multiple people
- Peter Denning, multiple people
- Peter Dennis, multiple people
- Peter Denton, multiple people
- Peter Devine, multiple people
- Peter Devlin, multiple people
- Peter Dews, multiple people
- Peter Diamond, multiple people
- Peter Dickinson, multiple people
- Peter Dickson, multiple people
- Peter Dixon, multiple people
- Peter Doherty, multiple people
- Peter Dodds, multiple people
- Peter Doherty, multiple people
- Peter Doig, multiple people
- Peter Petrovich Dolgorukov, multiple people
- Peter Donahue, multiple people
- Peter Donaldson, multiple people
- Peter Donnelly, multiple people
- Peter Donohoe, multiple people
- Peter Douglas, multiple people
- Peter Doyle, multiple people
- Peter Draper, multiple people
- Peter Drummond, multiple people
- Peter Du Cane, multiple people
- Peter Dubovský, multiple people
- Peter Dunbar, multiple people
- Peter Duncan, multiple people
- Peter Dunn, multiple people
- Peter Dunne, multiple people
- Peter Eastman, multiple people
- Peter Eccles, multiple people
- Peter Eckersley, multiple people
- Peter Edwards, multiple people
- Peter Egan, multiple people
- Peter Elliott, multiple people
- Peter Ellis, multiple people
- Peter Engel, multiple people
- Peter Engle, multiple people
- Peter Eriksson, multiple people
- Peter Ernest, multiple people
- Peter Evans, multiple people
- Peter Faber, multiple people
- Peter Fagan, multiple people
- Peter Fairclough, multiple people
- Peter Falconer, multiple people
- Peter Falk, multiple people
- Peter Fallon, multiple people
- Péter Farkas, multiple people
- Peter Farmer, multiple people
- Peter Farrell, multiple people
- Peter Fenger, multiple people
- Peter Fay, multiple people
- Peter Feldman, multiple people
- Peter Feldstein, multiple people
- Peter Fenton, multiple people
- Peter Fenwick, multiple people
- Peter Fischer, multiple people
- Peter Fish, multiple people
- Peter Fisher, multiple people
- Peter Fitzgerald, multiple people
- Peter Fleming, multiple people
- Peter Fletcher, multiple people
- Peter Finch, multiple people
- Peter Flynn, multiple people
- Peter Foley, multiple people
- Peter Forbes, multiple people
- Peter Ford, multiple people
- Peter Forster, multiple people
- Peter Foster, multiple people
- Peter Fox, multiple people
- Peter Fraenkel, multiple people
- Peter Frampton, multiple people
- Peter Francis, multiple people
- Peter Frank, multiple people
- Peter Fraser, multiple people
- Peter Freeman, multiple people
- Peter Frelinghuysen, multiple people
- Peter French, multiple people
- Peter Frey, multiple people
- Peter Fricker, multiple people
- Peter Friend, multiple people
- Peter Gallagher, multiple people
- Peter Gandy, multiple people
- Peter Gardiner, multiple people
- Peter Gardner, multiple people
- Peter Garland, multiple people
- Peter Gatenby, multiple people
- Peter Gavin, multiple people
- Peter George, multiple people
- Peter Gerber, multiple people
- Peter Gibbs, multiple people
- Peter Gibson, multiple people
- Peter Gilbert, multiple people
- Peter Gilchrist, multiple people
- Peter Giles, multiple people
- Peter Gill, multiple people
- Peter Gilmore, multiple people
- Peter Glanz, multiple people
- Peter Gleane, multiple people
- Peter Glick, multiple people
- Peter Glover, multiple people
- Peter Goddard, multiple people
- Peter Godfrey, multiple people
- Peter Golden, multiple people
- Peter Goldmark, multiple people
- Peter Gomez, multiple people
- Peter Goodfellow, multiple people
- Peter Gordon, multiple people
- Peter Gow, multiple people
- Peter Grace, multiple people
- Peter Graham, multiple people
- Peter Grain, multiple people
- Peter Grant, multiple people
- Peter Graves, multiple people
- Peter Gray, multiple people
- Peter Green, multiple people
- Peter Greenall, multiple people
- Peter Gregg, multiple people
- Peter Gregory, multiple people
- Peter Gregson, multiple people
- Peter Griffin, multiple people
- Peter Griffiths, multiple people
- Peter Gross, multiple people
- Peter Grubb, multiple people
- Peter Gruber, multiple people
- Peter Guinness, multiple people
- Peter Gunn, multiple people
- Peter Guthrie, multiple people
- Peter Gutmann, multiple people
- Peter Haas, multiple people
- Peter Hacker, multiple people
- Peter Hackett, multiple people
- Peter Hadfield, multiple people
- Peter Hadley, multiple people
- Peter Haining, multiple people
- Peter Hains, multiple people
- Péter Halász, multiple people
- Peter Halkett, multiple people
- Peter Hall, multiple people
- Peter Hamilton, multiple people
- Peter Hammer, multiple people
- Peter Hammond, multiple people
- Peter Hancock, multiple people
- Peter Hanlon, multiple people
- Peter Hannaford, multiple people
- Peter Hannan, multiple people
- Peter Hansen, multiple people
- Peter Hardcastle, multiple people
- Peter Harder, multiple people
- Peter Harding, multiple people
- Peter Hardy, multiple people
- Peter Hare, multiple people
- Peter Harper, multiple people
- Peter Harris, multiple people
- Peter Harrison, multiple people
- Peter Hart, multiple people
- Peter Hartley, multiple people
- Peter Hartwig, multiple people
- Peter Harvey, multiple people
- Peter Hastings, multiple people
- Peter Hay, multiple people
- Peter Hayes, multiple people
- Peter Hayman, multiple people
- Peter Haynes, multiple people
- Peter Head, multiple people
- Peter Hedström, multiple people
- Peter Heller, multiple people
- Peter Henderson, multiple people
- Peter Henrici, multiple people
- Peter Henry, multiple people
- Peter Herbert, multiple people
- Peter Hermann, multiple people
- Peter Hess, multiple people
- Peter Hewitt, multiple people
- Peter Higgins, multiple people
- Peter Hill, multiple people
- Peter Hilton, multiple people
- Peter Hirsch, multiple people
- Peter Ho, multiple people
- Peter Hoare, multiple people
- Peter Hobbs, multiple people
- Peter Hobday, multiple people
- Peter Hodgkinson, multiple people
- Peter Hodgson, multiple people
- Peter Hoffmann, multiple people
- Peter Hogan, multiple people
- Peter Holland, multiple people
- Peter Hollins, multiple people
- Peter Holm, multiple people
- Peter Holmes, multiple people
- Peter Holst, multiple people
- Peter Hooper, multiple people
- Peter Hope, multiple people
- Peter Hordern, multiple people
- Peter Horn, multiple people
- Peter Hosking, multiple people
- Peter Howard, multiple people
- Peter Howe, multiple people
- Peter Howell, multiple people
- Peter Howells, multiple people
- Peter Howitt, multiple people
- Peter Huber, multiple people
- Peter Hudson, multiple people
- Peter Hughes, multiple people
- Peter Hume, multiple people
- Peter Hunt, multiple people
- Peter Hunter, multiple people
- Peter Hutchinson, multiple people
- Peter Hutton, multiple people
- Peter Hynes, multiple people
- Peter Ingham, multiple people
- Peter Jackson, multiple people
- Peter Jacobs, multiple people
- Peter Jacobson, multiple people
- Peter James, multiple people
- Peter Jansen, multiple people
- Peter Jay, multiple people
- Peter Jeffrey, multiple people
- Peter Jenkins, multiple people
- Peter Jennings, multiple people
- Peter Jensen, multiple people
- Peter Johansson, multiple people
- Peter John, multiple people
- Peter Johnson, multiple people
- Peter Johnston, multiple people
- Peter Johnstone, multiple people
- Peter Jonas, multiple people
- Peter Jones, multiple people
- Peter Jordan, multiple people
- Peter Judd, multiple people
- Peter Judge, multiple people
- Péter Juhász, multiple people
- Peter Kaiser, multiple people
- Peter Kalmus, multiple people
- Peter Kane, multiple people
- Peter Karlsson, multiple people
- Peter Karp, multiple people
- Peter Kasper, multiple people
- Peter Katz, multiple people
- Peter Kaufmann, multiple people
- Peter Kavanagh, multiple people
- Peter Kay, multiple people
- Peter Keane, multiple people
- Peter Keeley, multiple people
- Peter Keen, multiple people
- Peter Keglevic, multiple people
- Peter Kelleher, multiple people
- Peter Keller, multiple people
- Peter Kelly, multiple people
- Peter Kemp, multiple people
- Peter Kendall, multiple people
- Peter Kennedy, multiple people
- Peter Kern, multiple people
- Peter Kerr, multiple people
- Peter Kildal, multiple people
- Peter Kim, multiple people
- Peter King, multiple people
- Peter Kingston, multiple people
- Peter Kippax, multiple people
- Peter Kirby, multiple people
- Peter Kirk, multiple people
- Peter Kiss, multiple people
- Peter Kjær, multiple people
- Peter Klein, multiple people
- Peter Knight, multiple people
- Peter Knudsen, multiple people
- Peter Koch, multiple people
- Péter Kovács, multiple people
- Péter Kozma, multiple people
- Peter Kramer, multiple people
- Peter Kraus, multiple people
- Peter Krieger, multiple people
- Peter Krogh, multiple people
- Peter Kyle, multiple people
- Peter Kwong, multiple people
- Peter La Touche, multiple people
- Peter Lai, multiple people
- Peter Lamb, multiple people
- Peter Lambert, multiple people
- Peter Lamont, multiple people
- Peter Lane, multiple people
- Peter Lang, multiple people
- Peter Lange, multiple people
- Peter Larkin, multiple people
- Peter Larsen, multiple people
- Peter Larsson, multiple people
- Peter Latham, multiple people
- Peter Latz, multiple people
- Peter Lawler, multiple people
- Peter Lawrence, multiple people
- Peter Lawson, multiple people
- Peter Lee, multiple people
- Peter Legh, multiple people
- Peter Lehmann, multiple people
- Peter Leitch, multiple people
- Peter Leonard, multiple people
- Peter Lester, multiple people
- Peter Levine, multiple people
- Peter Levy, multiple people
- Peter Lewis, multiple people
- Peter Li, multiple people
- Peter Lin, multiple people
- Peter Line, multiple people
- Peter Lindgren, multiple people
- Peter Liu, multiple people
- Peter Livingston, multiple people
- Peter Ljung, multiple people
- Peter Lloyd, multiple people
- Peter Locke, multiple people
- Peter Logan, multiple people
- Peter Lorimer, multiple people
- Peter Lowe, multiple people
- Peter Lowry, multiple people
- Peter Lucas, multiple people
- Peter Ludlow, multiple people
- Péter Lukács, multiple people
- Peter Lund, multiple people
- Peter Lynch, multiple people
- Peter Lyons, multiple people
- Peter MacDonald, multiple people
- Peter MacGregor, multiple people
- Peter Machin, multiple people
- Peter Mackenzie, multiple people
- Peter Mack, multiple people
- Peter Mackie, multiple people
- Peter Madden, multiple people
- Peter Madsen, multiple people
- Peter Maher, multiple people
- Peter Mahon, multiple people
- Peter Malcolm, multiple people
- Peter Malone, multiple people
- Peter Maloney, multiple people
- Peter Mann, multiple people
- Peter Manning, multiple people
- Peter Marchant, multiple people
- Peter Marks, multiple people
- Peter Marlow, multiple people
- Peter Marsh, multiple people
- Peter Marshall, multiple people
- Peter Martin, multiple people
- Peter Martyn, multiple people
- Peter Martyr, multiple people
- Peter Marx, multiple people
- Peter Mason, multiple people
- Péter Máté, multiple people
- Peter Mathieson, multiple people
- Peter Matthews, multiple people
- Peter Maurice, multiple people
- Peter Maxwell, multiple people
- Peter May, multiple people
- Peter Mayhew, multiple people
- Peter McArdle, multiple people
- Peter McArthur, multiple people
- Peter McBride, multiple people
- Peter McCall, multiple people
- Peter McCann, multiple people
- Peter McCarthy, multiple people
- Peter McConnell, multiple people
- Peter McCormack, multiple people
- Peter McCracken, multiple people
- Peter McCullough, multiple people
- Peter McDermott, multiple people
- Peter McDonald, multiple people
- Peter McDonnell, multiple people
- Peter McDougall, multiple people
- Peter McEvoy, multiple people
- Peter McIntyre, multiple people
- Peter McKay, multiple people
- Peter McKenna, multiple people
- Peter McKenzie, multiple people
- Peter McLean, multiple people
- Peter McNamee, multiple people
- Peter McNeil, multiple people
- Peter McNulty, multiple people
- Peter McPhee, multiple people
- Peter McPherson, multiple people
- Peter Meechan, multiple people
- Peter Menzies, multiple people
- Peter Mesier, multiple people
- Peter Meyer, multiple people
- Peter Michael, multiple people
- Peter Middleton, multiple people
- Peter Mikkelsen, multiple people
- Peter Miles, multiple people
- Peter Millar, multiple people
- Peter Miller, multiple people
- Peter Millett, multiple people
- Peter Mills, multiple people
- Peter Milne, multiple people
- Peter Milton, multiple people
- Peter Mitchell, multiple people
- Peter Moffett, multiple people
- Peter Molloy, multiple people
- Péter Molnár, multiple people
- Peter Montgomery, multiple people
- Peter Moon, multiple people
- Peter Moore, multiple people
- Peter Moores, multiple people
- Peter Moran, multiple people
- Peter Morgan, multiple people
- Peter Morin, multiple people
- Peter Morley, multiple people
- Peter Morris, multiple people
- Peter Morrison, multiple people
- Peter Mortimer, multiple people
- Peter Mountford, multiple people
- Peter Mráz, multiple people
- Peter Muller, multiple people
- Peter Mumford, multiple people
- Peter Munch, multiple people
- Peter Munro, multiple people
- Peter Murdoch, multiple people
- Peter Murphy, multiple people
- Peter Murray, multiple people
- Peter Myers, multiple people
- Péter Nagy, multiple people
- Peter Ndegwa, multiple people
- Peter Needham, multiple people
- Peter Neilson, multiple people
- Peter Nelson, multiple people
- Peter Neumann, multiple people
- Peter Newell, multiple people
- Peter Newman, multiple people
- Peter Newton, multiple people
- Peter Ng, multiple people
- Peter Nguyen, multiple people
- Peter Nicholas, multiple people
- Peter Nicholls, multiple people
- Peter Nichols, multiple people
- Peter Nicholson, multiple people
- Peter Nielsen, multiple people
- Peter Nightingale, multiple people
- Peter Nilsson, multiple people
- Peter Nissen, multiple people
- Peter Noble, multiple people
- Peter Nordbeck, multiple people
- Peter North, multiple people
- Peter Norton, multiple people
- Peter O'Brian, multiple people
- Peter O'Brien, multiple people
- Peter O'Connor, multiple people
- Peter O'Donnell, multiple people
- Peter O'Donoghue, multiple people
- Peter O'Leary, multiple people
- Peter O'Loghlen, multiple people
- Peter O'Malley, multiple people
- Peter O'Reilly, multiple people
- Peter O'Rourke, multiple people
- Peter O'Sullivan, multiple people
- Peter Öberg, multiple people
- Peter Odhiambo, multiple people
- Peter Ogden, multiple people
- Peter Oliver, multiple people
- Peter Olsson, multiple people
- Peter Olver, multiple people
- Peter Openshaw, multiple people
- Peter Oppenheimer, multiple people
- Peter Ortiz, multiple people
- Peter Osborne, multiple people
- Peter Owen, multiple people
- Peter Palmer, multiple people
- Peter Palumbo, multiple people
- Peter Parker, multiple people
- Peter Parrott, multiple people
- Peter Paterson, multiple people
- Peter Patterson, multiple people
- Peter Patton, multiple people
- Peter Paul, multiple people
- Peter Pearson, multiple people
- Peter Pedersen, multiple people
- Peter Perry, multiple people
- Peter Peter, multiple people
- Peter Peters, multiple people
- Peter Petersen, multiple people
- Peter Peterson, multiple people
- Peter Pett, multiple people
- Peter Peyser, multiple people
- Peter Phelps, multiple people
- Peter Phillips, multiple people
- Peter Phipps, multiple people
- Peter Phiri, multiple people
- Peter Pike, multiple people
- Peter Pokorny, multiple people
- Peter Pope, multiple people
- Peter Porter, multiple people
- Peter Powell, multiple people
- Peter Prendergast, multiple people
- Peter Prescott, multiple people
- Peter Price, multiple people
- Peter Queally, multiple people
- Peter Quinn, multiple people
- Peter Rainier, multiple people
- Peter Ramsden, multiple people
- Peter Randall, multiple people
- Peter Randolph, multiple people
- Peter Rasmussen, multiple people
- Peter Ravn, multiple people
- Peter Rawlinson, multiple people
- Peter Read, multiple people
- Peter Reed, multiple people
- Peter Rees, multiple people
- Peter Reid, multiple people
- Peter Reilly, multiple people
- Peter Reiter, multiple people
- Peter Reynolds, multiple people
- Peter Rice, multiple people
- Peter Richards, multiple people
- Peter Richardson, multiple people
- Peter Richman, multiple people
- Peter Rieger, multiple people
- Peter Roach, multiple people
- Peter Robb, multiple people
- Peter Robbins, multiple people
- Peter Roberts, multiple people
- Peter Robertson, multiple people
- Peter Robinson, multiple people
- Peter Roche, multiple people
- Peter Rock, multiple people
- Peter Rodríguez, multiple people
- Peter Roe, multiple people
- Peter Rogers, multiple people
- Peter Romero, multiple people
- Peter Rona, multiple people
- Peter Rose, multiple people
- Peter Ross, multiple people
- Peter Rost, multiple people
- Peter Roth, multiple people
- Peter Rowe, multiple people
- Peter Rowley, multiple people
- Peter Rowsthorn, multiple people
- Peter Royston, multiple people
- Peter Rull, multiple people
- Peter Russell, multiple people
- Peter Russo, multiple people
- Peter Ryan, multiple people
- Peter Saburov, multiple people
- Peter Sainthill, multiple people
- Peter Salmon, multiple people
- Peter Sanders, multiple people
- Peter Sands, multiple people
- Peter Saunders, multiple people
- Peter Saville, multiple people
- Peter Scanlon, multiple people
- Peter Scarlett, multiple people
- Peter Schaefer, multiple people
- Peter Schaffer, multiple people
- Peter Schenk, multiple people
- Peter Schiller, multiple people
- Peter Schmid, multiple people
- Peter Schmidt, multiple people
- Peter Schneider, multiple people
- Peter Schnell, multiple people
- Peter Schofield, multiple people
- Peter Schreiner, multiple people
- Peter Schubert, multiple people
- Peter Schultz, multiple people
- Peter Schuster, multiple people
- Peter Schwartz, multiple people
- Peter Scott, multiple people
- Peter Seaman, multiple people
- Peter Sears, multiple people
- Peter Shapiro, multiple people
- Peter Sharp, multiple people
- Peter Shaw, multiple people
- Peter Shelton, multiple people
- Peter Shepherd, multiple people
- Peter Sheppard, multiple people
- Peter Sheridan, multiple people
- Peter Shields, multiple people
- Peter Short, multiple people
- Peter Shuvalov, multiple people
- Peter Silvester, multiple people
- Peter Simon, multiple people
- Peter Simons, multiple people
- Peter Simpson, multiple people
- Peter Sinclair, multiple people
- Peter Singer, multiple people
- Peter Slater, multiple people
- Peter Smet, multiple people
- Peter Smith, multiple people
- Peter Snow, multiple people
- Peter Solan, multiple people
- Peter Solomon, multiple people
- Peter Spencer, multiple people
- Peter Squires, multiple people
- Peter Stafford, multiple people
- Peter Stead, multiple people
- Peter Stein, multiple people
- Peter Steiner, multiple people
- Peter Stephens, multiple people
- Peter Sterling, multiple people
- Peter Stevens, multiple people
- Peter Stewart, multiple people
- Peter Stichbury, multiple people
- Peter Stillman, multiple people
- Peter Stone, multiple people
- Peter Stott, multiple people
- Peter Strasser, multiple people
- Peter Strauss, multiple people
- Peter Strickland, multiple people
- Peter Struck, multiple people
- Peter Stumpf, multiple people
- Peter Sturrock, multiple people
- Peter Stuyvesant, multiple people
- Peter Styles, multiple people
- Peter Sullivan, multiple people
- Peter Sutcliffe, multiple people
- Peter Sutton, multiple people
- Peter Swan, multiple people
- Peter Sykes, multiple people
- Péter Szilágyi, multiple people
- Peter Tait, multiple people
- Péter Takács, multiple people
- Peter Talbot, multiple people
- Peter Tapsell, multiple people
- Peter Taylor, multiple people
- Peter Temple, multiple people
- Peter the Elder, multiple people
- Peter Thomas, multiple people
- Peter Thomson, multiple people
- Peter Thorne, multiple people
- Peter Thuesen, multiple people
- Peter Toms, multiple people
- Péter Tóth, multiple people
- Peter Townend, multiple people
- Peter Townsend, multiple people
- Peter Travis, multiple people
- Peter Turnbull, multiple people
- Peter Turner, multiple people
- Peter Tuthill, multiple people
- Peter Urban, multiple people
- Peter van der Merwe, multiple people
- Peter Vanden Gheyn, multiple people
- Peter Vardy, multiple people
- Peter Vaughan, multiple people
- Peter Vecsey, multiple people
- Péter Veres, multiple people
- Peter Vischer, multiple people
- Peter Vogel, multiple people
- Peter von der Pahlen, multiple people
- Peter Vredenburgh, multiple people
- Peter Vroom, multiple people
- Peter Wagner, multiple people
- Peter Waite, multiple people
- Peter Wakefield, multiple people
- Peter Walker, multiple people
- Peter Wall, multiple people
- Peter Wallace, multiple people
- Peter Wallenberg, multiple people
- Peter Walsh, multiple people
- Peter Walton, multiple people
- Peter Warburton, multiple people
- Peter Ward, multiple people
- Peter Warren, multiple people
- Peter Waterhouse, multiple people
- Peter Watson, multiple people
- Peter Watts, multiple people
- Peter Webb, multiple people
- Peter Weber, multiple people
- Peter Webster, multiple people
- Peter Wedderburn, multiple people
- Peter Wegner, multiple people
- Peter Weir, multiple people
- Peter Wells, multiple people
- Peter Welsh, multiple people
- Peter Wenzel, multiple people
- Peter West, multiple people
- Peter Wheeler, multiple people
- Peter Whelan, multiple people
- Peter White, multiple people
- Peter Whitehead, multiple people
- Peter Whiteley, multiple people
- Peter Whiting, multiple people
- Peter Whittle, multiple people
- Peter Wight, multiple people
- Peter Wilkinson, multiple people
- Peter Williams, multiple people
- Peter Williamson, multiple people
- Peter Willis, multiple people
- Peter Willmott, multiple people
- Peter Wilson, multiple people
- Peter Winston, multiple people
- Peter Wishart, multiple people
- Peter Wolf, multiple people
- Peter Wolfe, multiple people
- Peter Wolff, multiple people
- Peter Wong, multiple people
- Peter Wood, multiple people
- Peter Woods, multiple people
- Peter Wright, multiple people
- Peter Wu, multiple people
- Peter Wyche, multiple people
- Peter Yates, multiple people
- Peter York, multiple people
- Peter Young, multiple people
- Peter Yu, multiple people
- Peter Zander, multiple people
- Peter Zaremba, multiple people
- Peter Zaťko, multiple people

== Fictional characters ==
- Peter Beale, on the BBC soap opera EastEnders
- Peter Bishop, in the TV series Fringe
- Peter "PC Principal" Charles, a character from South Park
- Peter Fogg, one of the classic Postman Pat characters
- Peter Griffin, the protagonist of the animated TV series Family Guy
- Peter Paul "Paulie Walnuts" Gualtieri, one of the main characters on The Sopranos
- Pete Lattimer, in the TV series Warehouse 13
- Sister Peter Marie, in the TV series Oz
- Peter Pan (character), created by Scottish novelist and playwright J. M. Barrie
- Peter Parker, the secret identity of Spider-Man, a Marvel Comics superhero
- Peter Petrelli, on the NBC television series Heroes
- Peter Pettigrew, from the Harry Potter novels
- Peter Pevensie, in The Chronicles of Narnia by C. S. Lewis
- Peter Quill, leader of the Guardians of the Galaxy in the Marvel Universe
- Peter Rabbit, an anthropomorphic character in various children's stories by Beatrix Potter
- Pete Ross, a DC Comics character commonly associated with Superman
- Peter Solomon, in the novel The Lost Symbol, by Dan Brown
- Peter Venkman, one of the main characters in the Ghostbusters franchise
- Peter Weyland, the CEO of the Weyland Corporation in TED 2023, Prometheus, and Alien: Covenant
- Peter Wiggin, Ender's older brother in the Ender's Game series by Orson Scott Card
- Lord Peter Wimsey, Gentleman Detective in a series of novels by Dorothy L Sayers
- Struwwelpeter, in the German children's book by Heinrich Hoffmann

== See also ==
- All pages beginning with Peter
- Pete (disambiguation)
- Peter (disambiguation)
- Peters (disambiguation)
- Petrus (disambiguation)
- Pierre (disambiguation)
- Pieter (disambiguation)
- Piter (disambiguation)
