= Peter Petersen =

Peter or Pete Petersen may refer to:

- Peter Petersen (soccer) (born 1981), South African footballer
- Peter Christian Petersen (1791–1853), Norwegian naval officer
- Peter Petersen (sport shooter) (1892–1964), Danish sports shooter
- Robert E. Petersen (1926–2007), American publisher, known as Pete
- Pete Petersen (politician) (born 1950), American politician
- Peter J. K. Petersen (1821–1896), Norwegian businessperson
- Peter Arnoldus Petersen (1851–1916), Norwegian businessperson
- Peter Petersen (born 1767) (1767–1850), Norwegian mining engineer, ironworks manager and politician
- Peter Petersen (musicologist) (born 1940), German musicologist
- Peter Petersen (actor) (1876–1956), German-born Austrian actor and theatre director

== See also ==
- Ole Peter Petersen (1822–1901), founder of Methodism in Norway
- Peter Peterson (disambiguation)
- Peter Pedersen (disambiguation)
