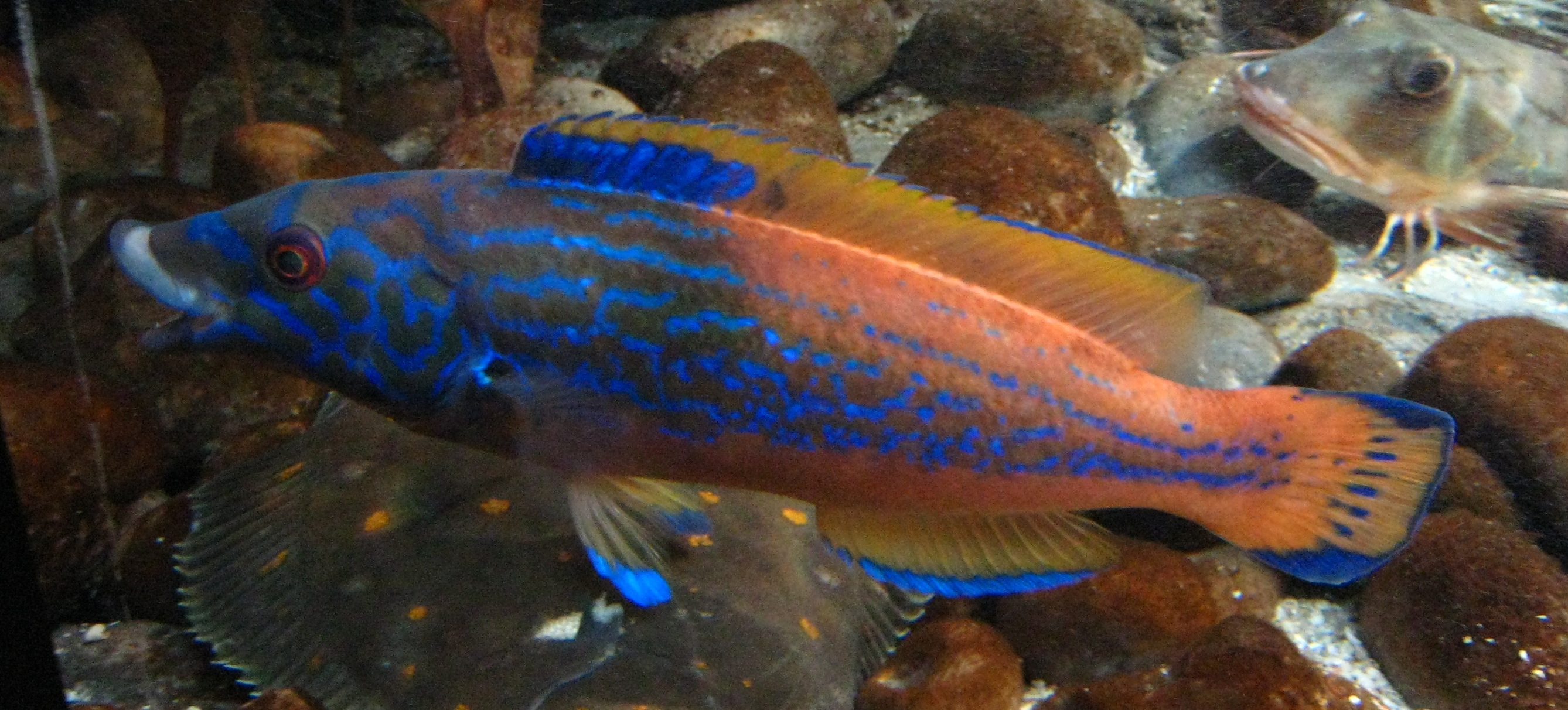

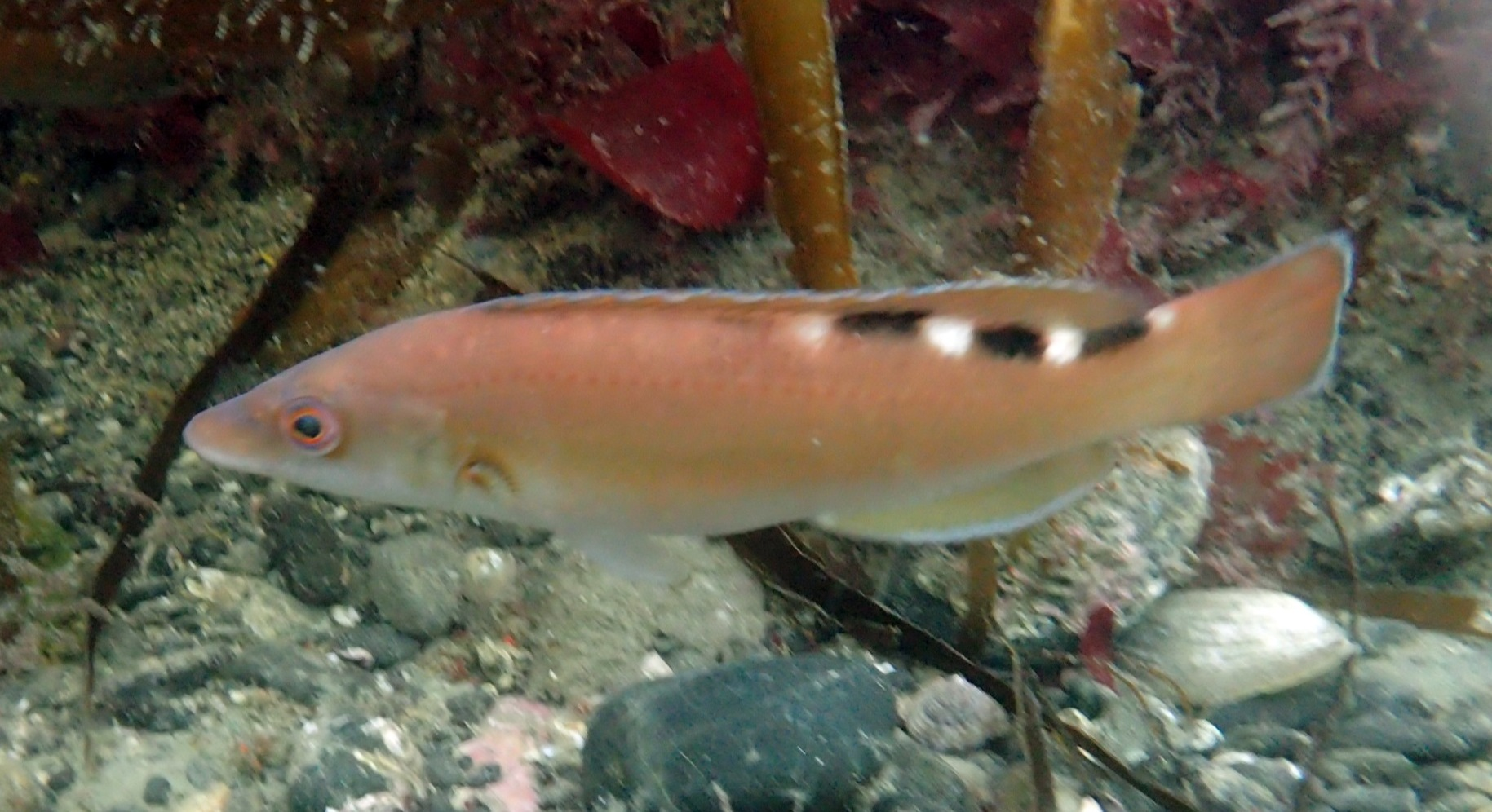
- Terminal phase (top); Initial phase (bottom)

Conservation status
- Least Concern (IUCN 3.1)

Scientific classification
- Kingdom: Animalia
- Phylum: Chordata
- Class: Actinopterygii
- Division: Teleostei
- Order: Labriformes
- Family: Labridae
- Genus: Labrus
- Species: L. mixtus

Binomial name
- Labrus mixtus Linnaeus, 1758

Synonyms
- List: Labrus ossifagus Linnaeus, 1758; Labrus varius Linnaeus, 1758; Labrus bimaculatus Linnaeus, 1758; Labrus coeruleus Ascanius, 1772; Labrus carneus Ascanius, 1772; Labrus trimaculatus Bonnaterre, 1788; Labrus lineatus Bonnaterre, 1788; Labrus variegatus J. F. Gmelin, 1789; Labrus coquus J. F. Gmelin, 1789; Sparus formosus Shaw, 1790; Labrus vetula Bloch, 1792; Labrus luvarus Rafinesque, 1810; Labrus quadrimaculatus A. Risso, 1827; Labrus larvatus Lowe, 1852

= Cuckoo wrasse =

Species of fish

The cuckoo wrasse (Labrus mixtus) is a species of wrasse native to the eastern Atlantic Ocean from Norway to Senegal, including the Azores and Madeira. It is also found in the Mediterranean Sea. They occur in weedy, rocky areas mostly between 40 and 80 m (130 and 260 ft). This species is an occasional food fish for local populations but is also popular as a game fish. It is also a popular fish for display in public aquaria.

== Taxonomy ==
The cuckoo wrasse was formally described by Carolus Linnaeus in the 10th edition of his Systema Naturae published in 1758, Linnaeus gave the type locality as "Liburnia", which is modern Dalmatia, Croatia.

=== Etymology ===
The name cuckoo wrasse comes from Cornish fishermen who associated the blue markings with bluebell flowers. In the Cornish language, a bluebell is bleujenn an gog, literally "the cuckoo flower".

== Description ==
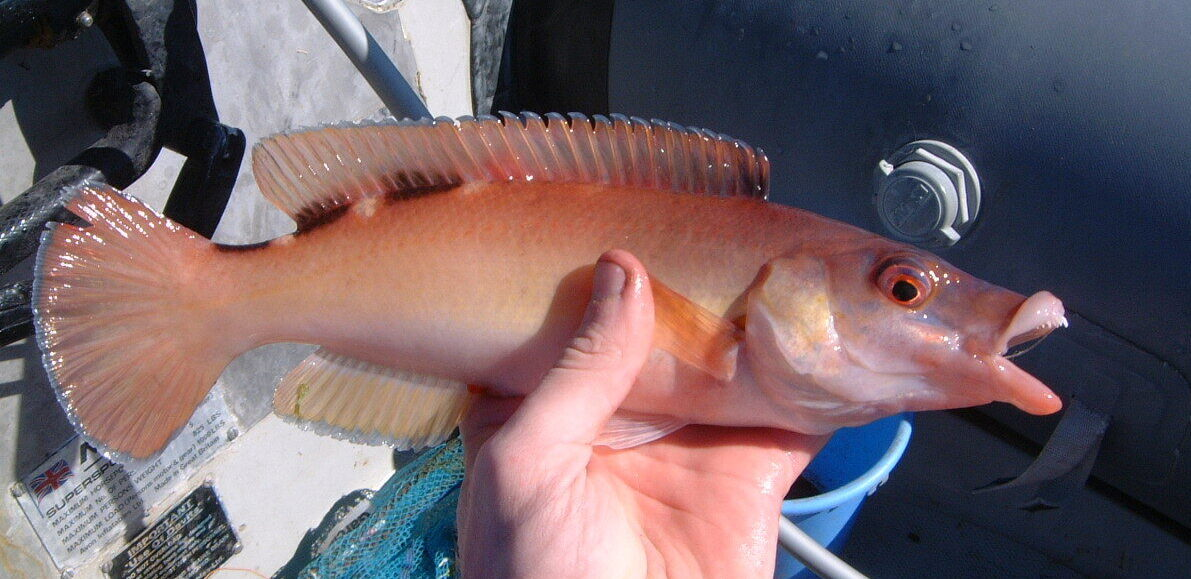
Initial phase

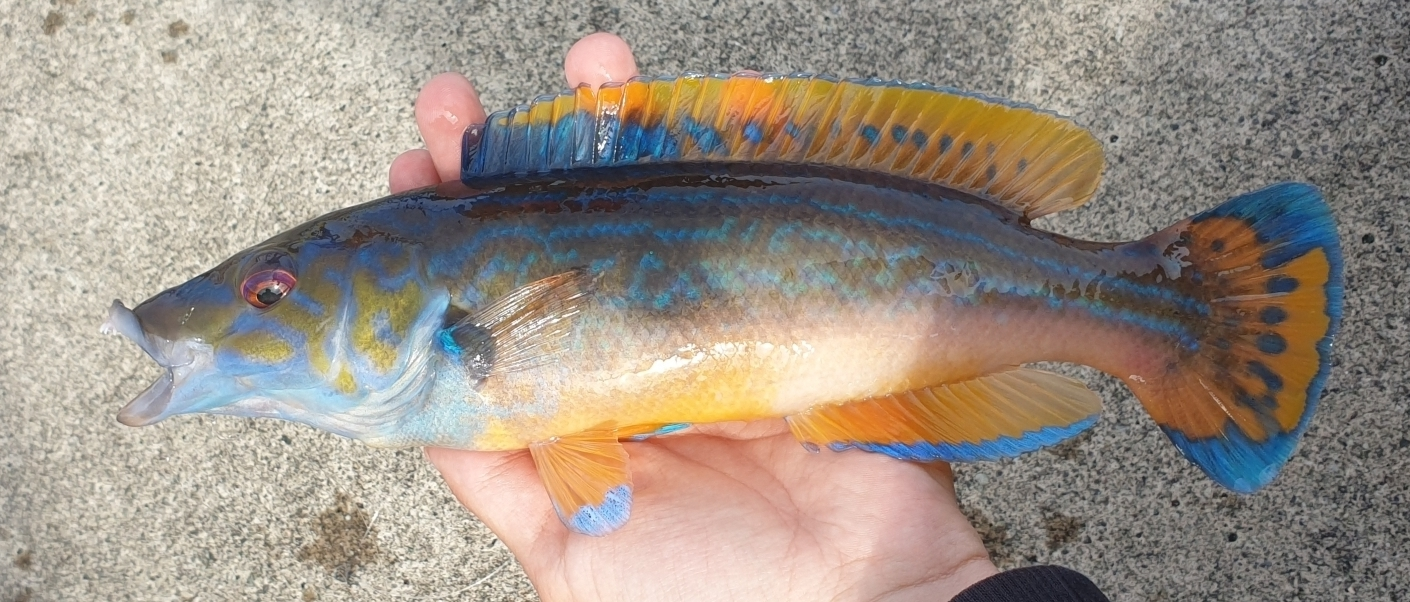
Terminal phase

The cuckoo wrasse has a long, pointed head, its body is slimmer and more elongated in shape than the ballan wrasse (Labrus bergylta), with which it is sympatric in the north eastern Atlantic. It is a very colourful fish which shows clear sexual dimorphism. The young males and the females are coloured with a mix of pink, orange and red. The females possess three black spots on their back to the rear of the dorsal fin, with white colouration between then which stretch to the tail which are not present on males. The males have blue heads and orange bodies, blue stripes and mottled patterns run along the body and there are blue lines on the margins of the fins. Like the ballan wrasse, the cuckoo wrasse has a small mouth with thick fleshy, folded lips and a single row of canine-like teeth in each jaw. The maximum total length for a male is 40 centimetres (16 in) and for females it is 30 centimetres (12 in), although the common total length for males is 30 centimetres (12 in). The long dorsal fin is even in height along its length and this species has large scales which are bigger than the pupil of the eye.

== Distribution ==
Terminal phase, in France

The cuckoo wrasse occurs in the north east Atlantic Ocean along the coast of Europe from Norway south to Andalusia and along the Atlantic coast of north Africa south to Senegal. It occurs off the Canary Islands, the Azores and Madeira too. Its range extends into the Mediterranean Sea as far as Cyprus, where it is common, but it is absent from the Levantine Sea.

== Habitat and biology ==
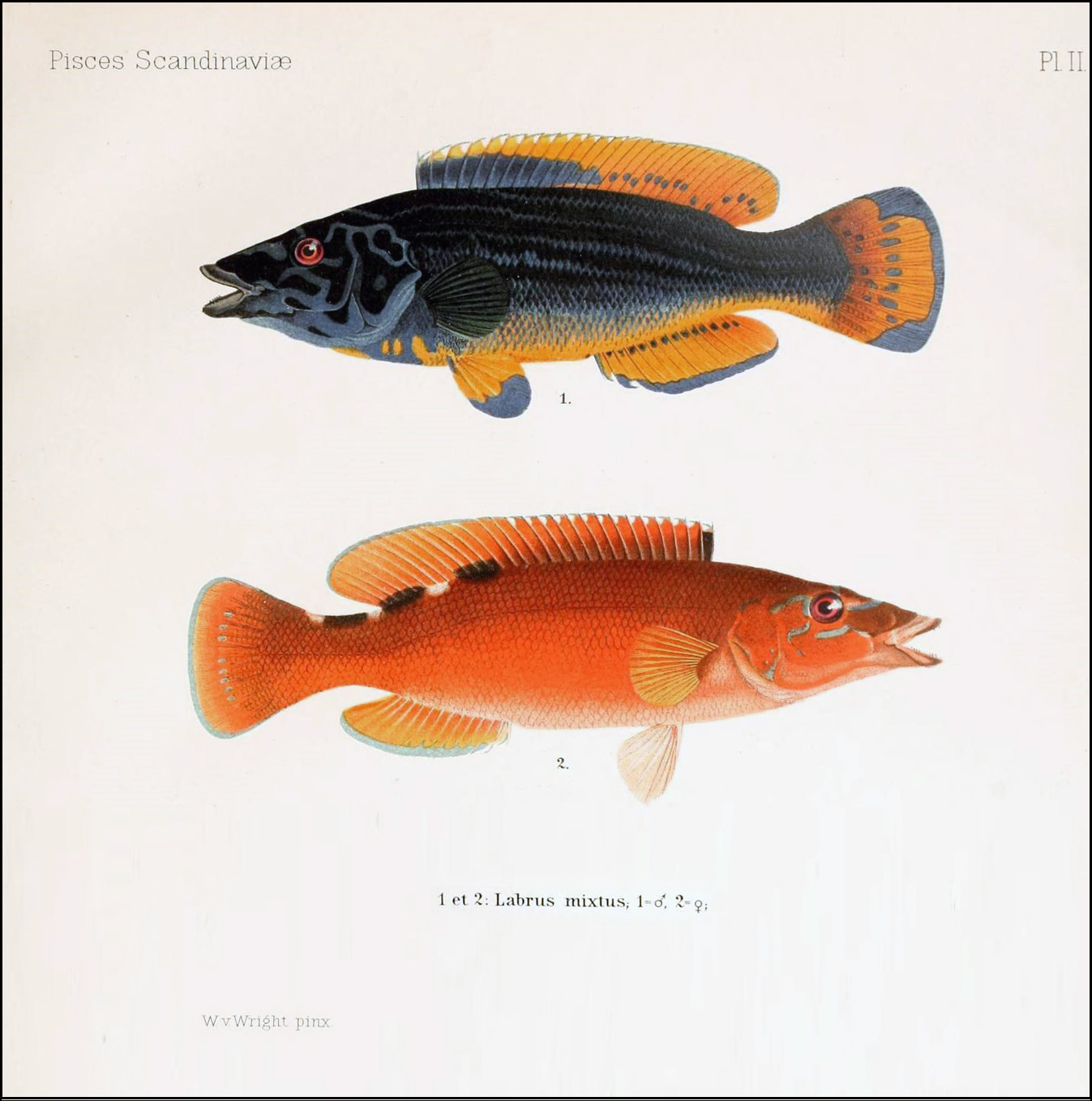
Cuckoo wrasse by Wilhelm von Wright.

The cuckoo wrasse is found where there are rocks and other hard substrates in the algal zone at depths of 2–200 metres (6 ft 7 in – 656 ft 2 in), but are mainly found between 20–80 metres (66–262 ft). It is also associated with area dominated by coralline algae. This species shows a preference for slightly deeper water than the ballan wrasse, with which it is sympatric off western Europe and only occasionally enters very shallow inshore waters. In the Azores adults of this species is normally not encountered above depths of 50 metres (160 ft), although juveniles may be found at shallower depths occasionally.

They are normally found occurring as solitary individuals or in pairs with young. They are oviparous and the female can lay up to a thousand eggs in a dish-shaped nest made by the male from algae, which he then guards. The cuckoo wrasse is a protogynous hermaphrodite, and females can change sex into males, a process which takes around seven months.

The diet consists mainly of crustaceans but it will also take fishes, molluscs and worms/

== Human usage ==
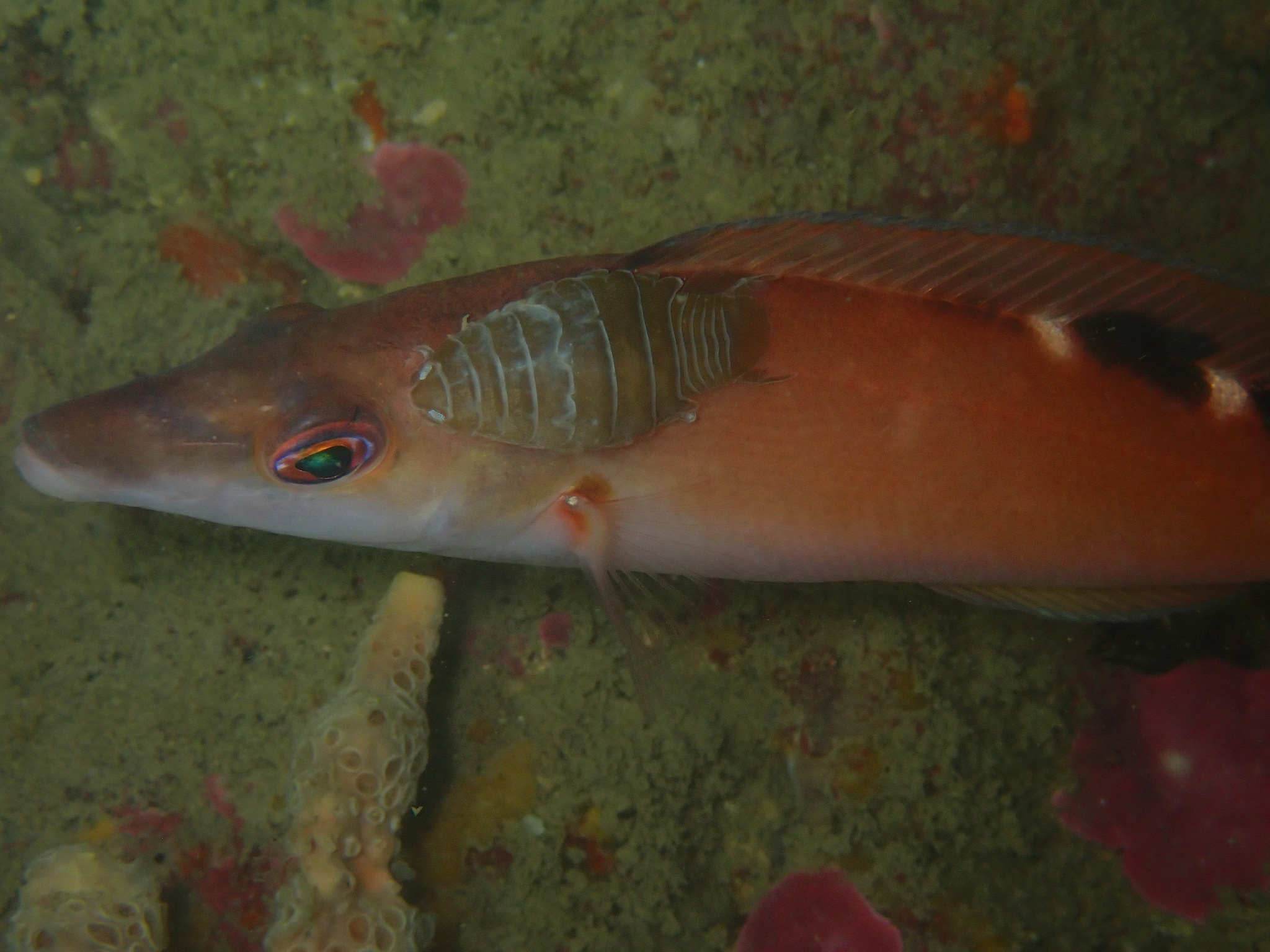
Initial phase, with a parasitic isopod

The cuckoo wrasse is occasionally eaten, but wrasse flesh is not popular in many places, for example in Britain, so it is not much in demand from commercial fisheries. It is fished by recreational anglers. As they are long-lived fish, their populations can be affected by too high a catch, so they are fished on a catch and release basis.

In Norway, cuckoo wrasse (along with other wrasse species) are used in salmon farming to eat salmon lice from the farmed fish. This leads to overfishing in some areas, and a noticeable decrease in population in selected areas.
