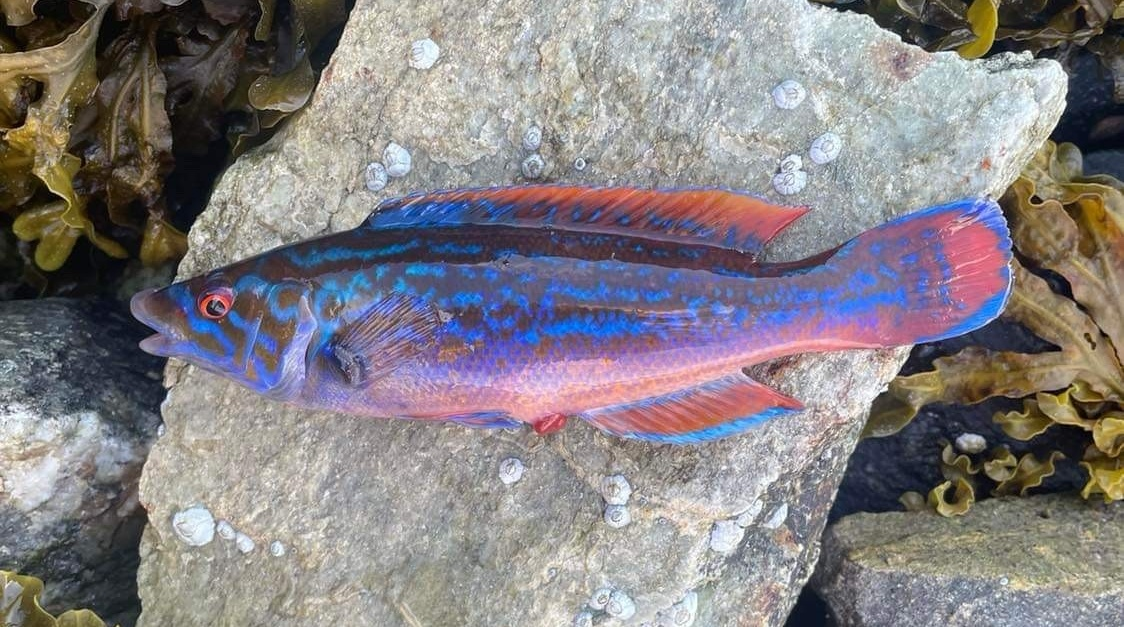
- Cuckoo wrasse (L. mixtus)

Scientific classification
- Kingdom: Animalia
- Phylum: Chordata
- Class: Actinopterygii
- Division: Teleostei
- Order: Labriformes
- Family: Labridae
- Subfamily: Labrinae
- Genus: Labrus; Linnaeus, 1758

Type species
- Labrus mixtus Linnaeus, 1758

Synonyms
- Cicla Artedi, 1793

= Labrus =

Labrus Temporal range: Eocene–Recent

Genus of fishes

Labrus is a genus of wrasses native to the eastern Atlantic Ocean into the Mediterranean and Black seas.

== Biology ==
Like most wrasses, Labrus species are protogynous, and can undergo sex change from female to male. The form of protogyny differs between species, e.g., Labrus bergylta is monandric (all fish are born female but can develop into males), while Labrus mixtus is diandric (individuals can be born either male or female, and females can develop into males). L. mixtus is sexually dimorphic in colouration, while L. bergylta is not.

== Species ==
The four currently recognized species in this genus are:

Species	Common name	Terminal phase
Labrus bergylta Ascanius, 1767	Ballan wrasse	
Labrus merula Linnaeus, 1758	brown wrasse	
Labrus mixtus Linnaeus, 1758	cuckoo wrasse	
Labrus viridis Linnaeus, 1758	green wrasse	

== Fossil record ==
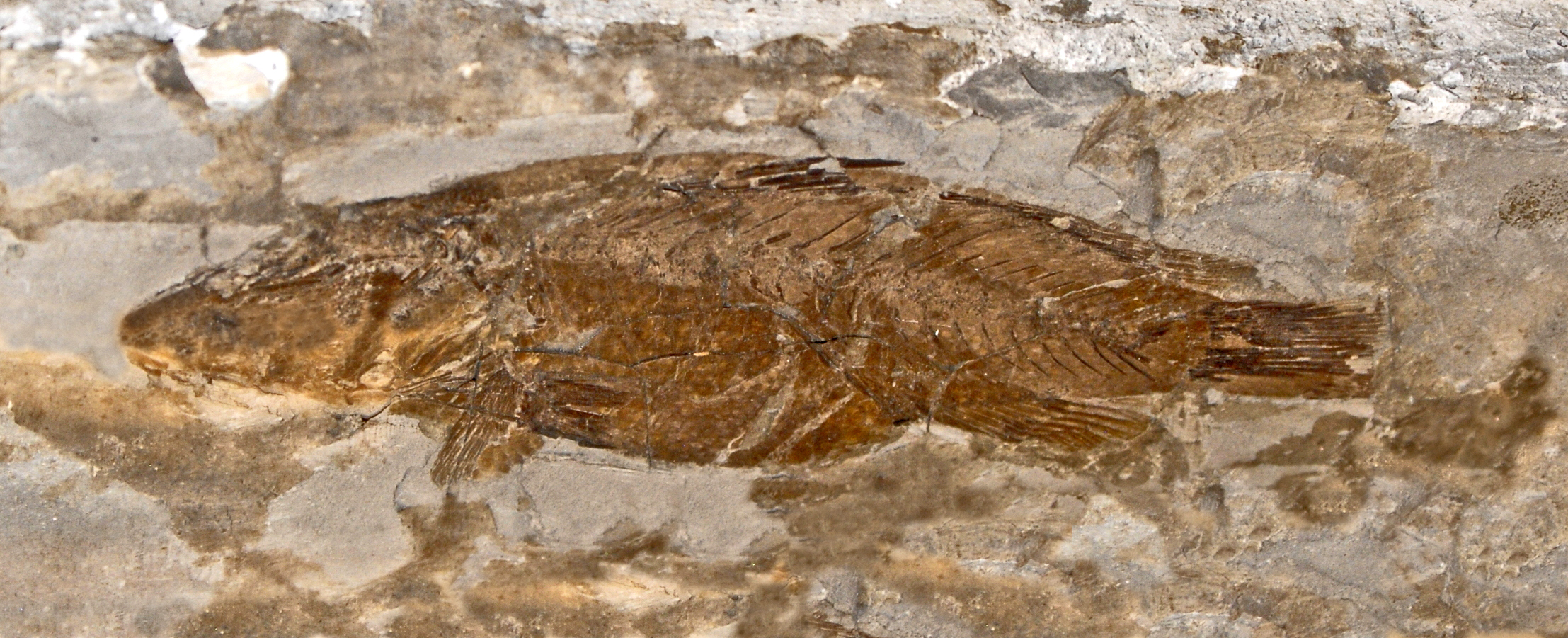
Fossil of Labrus valenciennesii

Fossils of Labrus are found from the Eocene to the Quaternary (age range: from 55.8 to 0.781 million years ago.). They are known from various localities of France, Italy and the United Kingdom.
