= Rådhusstræde 9 =

Building in Copenhagen, Denmark

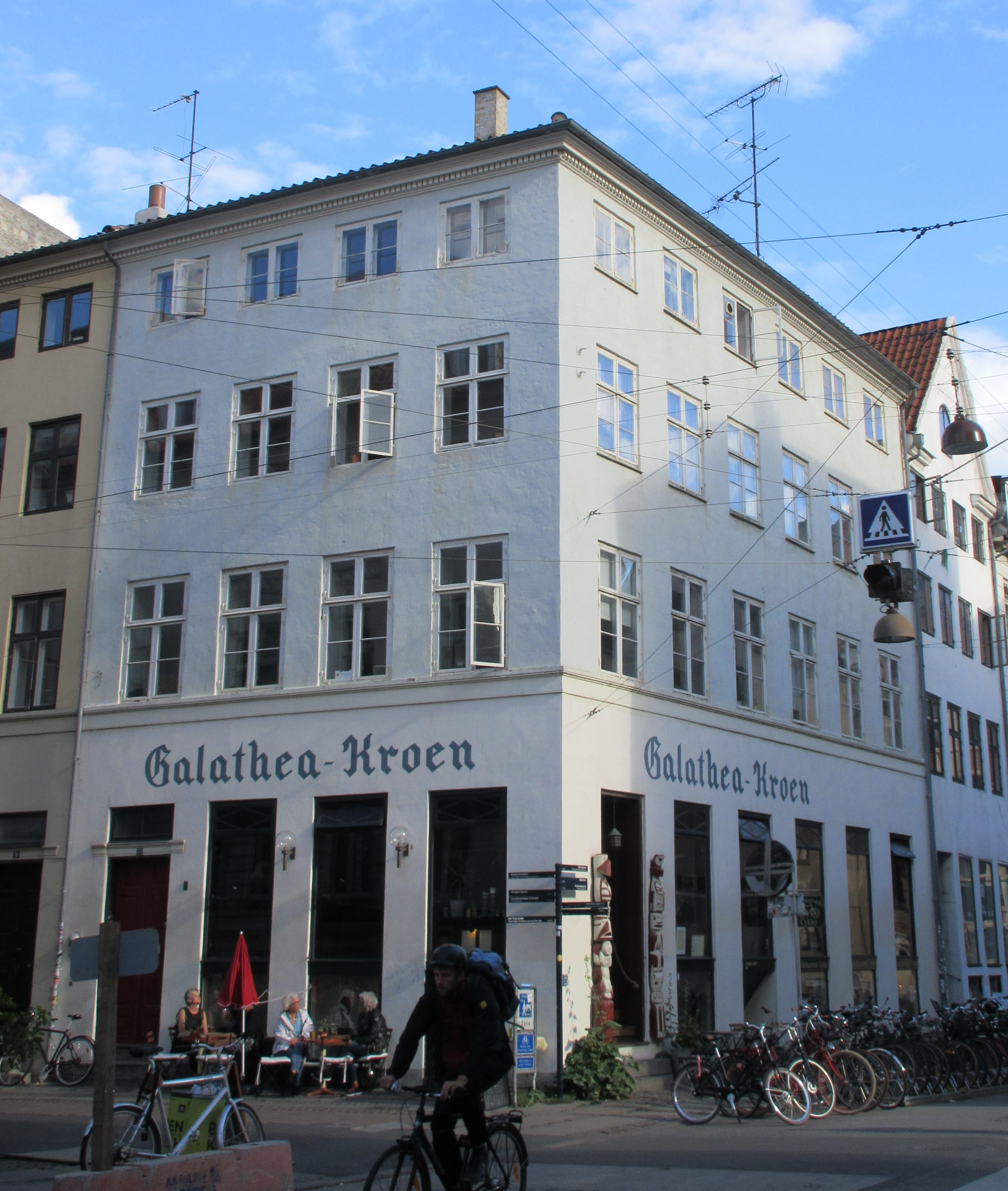
- Interactive map of the Rådhusstræde 9 area

General information
- Location: Copenhagen, Denmark coordinates = 55°40′35.76″N 12°34′28.42″E
- Completed: 1730-1734
- Renovated: 1744

Rådhusstræde 9 is an 18th-century property situated at the corner of Rådhusstræde and Kompagnistræde in the Old Town of Copenhagen, Denmark. The building was listed in the Danish registry of protected buildings and places in 1945. Former residents include the chemist Peter Ascanius and the marine painter Christian Eckardt. Galatheakroen, a bar decorated with exotica brought home from the 2nd Galathea Expedition, was opened in the ground floor by a former expedition member in 1958.

== History ==
=== 18th century ===
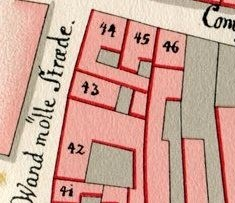
No. 44 seen on a detail from Christian Gedde's map of Snaren's Quarter, 1757.

In the late 17th century the site was part of a larger property. It was listed in Copenhagen's first cadastre of 1689 as No. 50 in Snaren's Quarter, owned by tailor Christen Christensen. After the Copenhagen Fire of 1728, the property was divided into two separate properties. The present corner building was constructed between 1734 and 1752 for master glazier Jacob Petersen. It was listed in the new cadastre of 1756 as No. 44 in Snaren's Quarter and belonged to lawyer Frederik Rohde's widow at that time. The eastern part of the old No. 50 was listed as No. 45 (now Kompagnistræde 31), owned by candlemaker Martn Pohlman.

The property was later acquired by kammerråd and renteskriver Jørgen Spliid (1741-1814). His property was home to three households at the time of the 1787 census. The owner resided in the building with his wife Kirstine Magdalene Rosenstand (1752-1834), two sons from his first marriage, his relative Laurits Biørn Spliid and two maids. Matthias Pedersen (1733–1799), a former Norwegian consul, resided in the building with his wife Charlotte Amalie van Deurs (1737–1804), three children and a maid. Charlotte Nielsen, widow of a beer seller (øltapper), resided in the basement with her thirteen-year-old son and a ten-year-old poor, orphaned girl.

=== 19th century ===
At the time of the 1801 census, the property was owned by grocer (urtekræmmer) Laurits (Lars) Biørn Olivarius. He lived in the building with his wife Anna Margretha Dorothea née Rasmussen, their one-year-old daughter Tomaly Georgine Henriette Olivarius, his sister Henriette Lovise Olivarius, two apprentices, two maids and two lodgers. Olivarius was originally from Asnæs in Odsherred. He had been licensed as a grocer in Copenhagen on 26 May 1797 and married his wife on 7 June the same year. She had previously been married to his younger brother, Frederik, who had also been a grocer in Copenhagen (on 11 February 1793) but died on 4 April 1796. The former owner of the house, Jørgen Spliid, was also still living in the building with his wife Kirstine and a maid. Peter Ascanius, a professor and former berghauptmand in Norway, resided in the building with his housekeeper Maria Kirstina Lillevang and a maid.

The property was listed as No. 42 in the new cadastre of 1806. It was still owned by Olivarius then. Around that time, he turned to farming after purchasing a farm in Kongens Lyngby. He later continued to Frederiksværk where he worked as a senior clerk at the local copper works for a while. Around 1816, he returned to Copenhagen where he resumed his career as a grocer and served as rodemester (a sort of district executive) of Nørrebro and Østerbro from 1817.

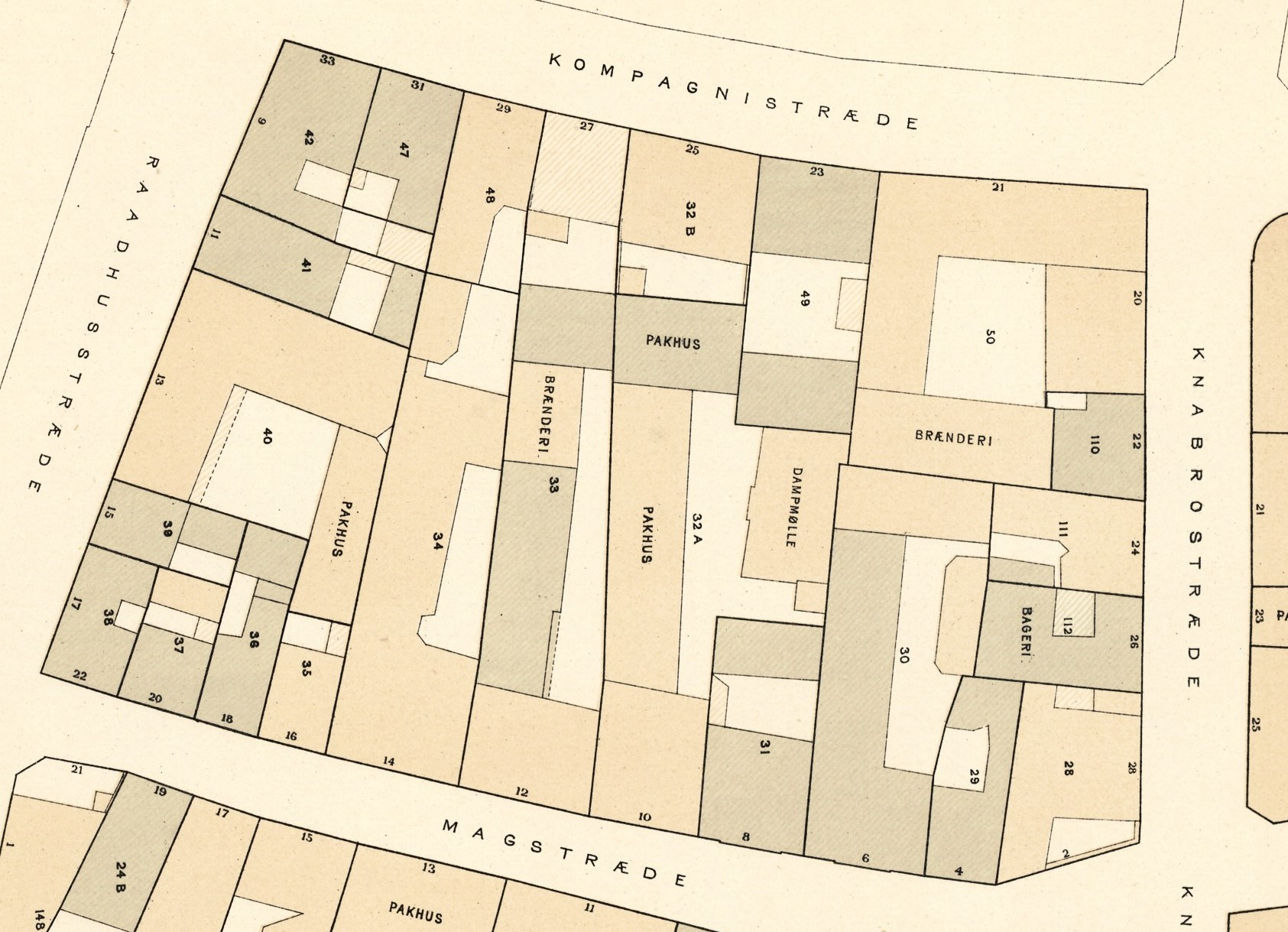
Knabrostræde 28 seen on a detail from Berggreen's cadastral map of Snaren's Quarter, 1884.

Rådhusstræde 42 was home to a total of 25 people at the time of the 1840 census. Caroline Mortensen, a 73-year-old widow, resided on the second floor with her unmarried daughter, two lodgers and one maid. Juliane Sophie Lynge, another widow, resided on the first floor with her daughter Christiane Rebekka Lynge and stepdaughter Sigfriede Amalie Lindberg. Johan Thorsen, an unskilled labourer, resided on the third floor with his Elisabeth Margrethe and a lodger. Carl Georg Lenkewitz, an employee of Tallotteriet, resided on the ground floor with his wife Anna Kristine Elisabeth Pisselhøy, their three children (aged 11 to 22) and a maid. Carl Frederik Wilde Simonsen, a master plumber and first lieutenant in Copenhagen's Civilian Artillery, resided in the basement with his wife Caroline Wilhelmine Hertzløv and their five children (aged 7 to 17).

The rear wing was home to a total of 26 people at the time of the 1860 census. Sisters Marie and Sophie Eckstrøm resided in the first floor apartment with a maid and a lodger. 23-year-old marine painter Christian Eckardt resided on the third floor with his parents and four siblings. His mother and three sisters were all employed with needlework. The other residents included a master shoemaker, a tailor and a number of other women employed with needlework.

== Architecture ==
The building is constructed with four storeys over a walk-out basement towards the street but just three storeys towards the yard. The simple, plastered façade is finished with a sill course below the first floor windows and a dentillated cornice. The main entrance is located in the bay furthest to the left towards Kompagnistræde. The red-painted door is topped by a transom window. One of two basement entrances is located in the bay furthest to the right. The separate entrance to Galatheakroen is located in the bay furthest to the left towards Rådhusstræde. The other basement entrance is located in the third bay from the left towards Rådhusstræde.

The original corner building from 1734 was a three-storey building with a two-bay gabled wall dormer on Kompagnistræde and a two-bay shorter façade on Rådhusstræde. The building was expanded with two bays towards Rådhusstræde by 1752 and an additional three-bay gabled wall dormer towards Kompagnistræde had also been added by then. The solution with a full fourth storey towards the street and a sloped roof towards the yard was introduced in 1844.

== Galatheakroen ==
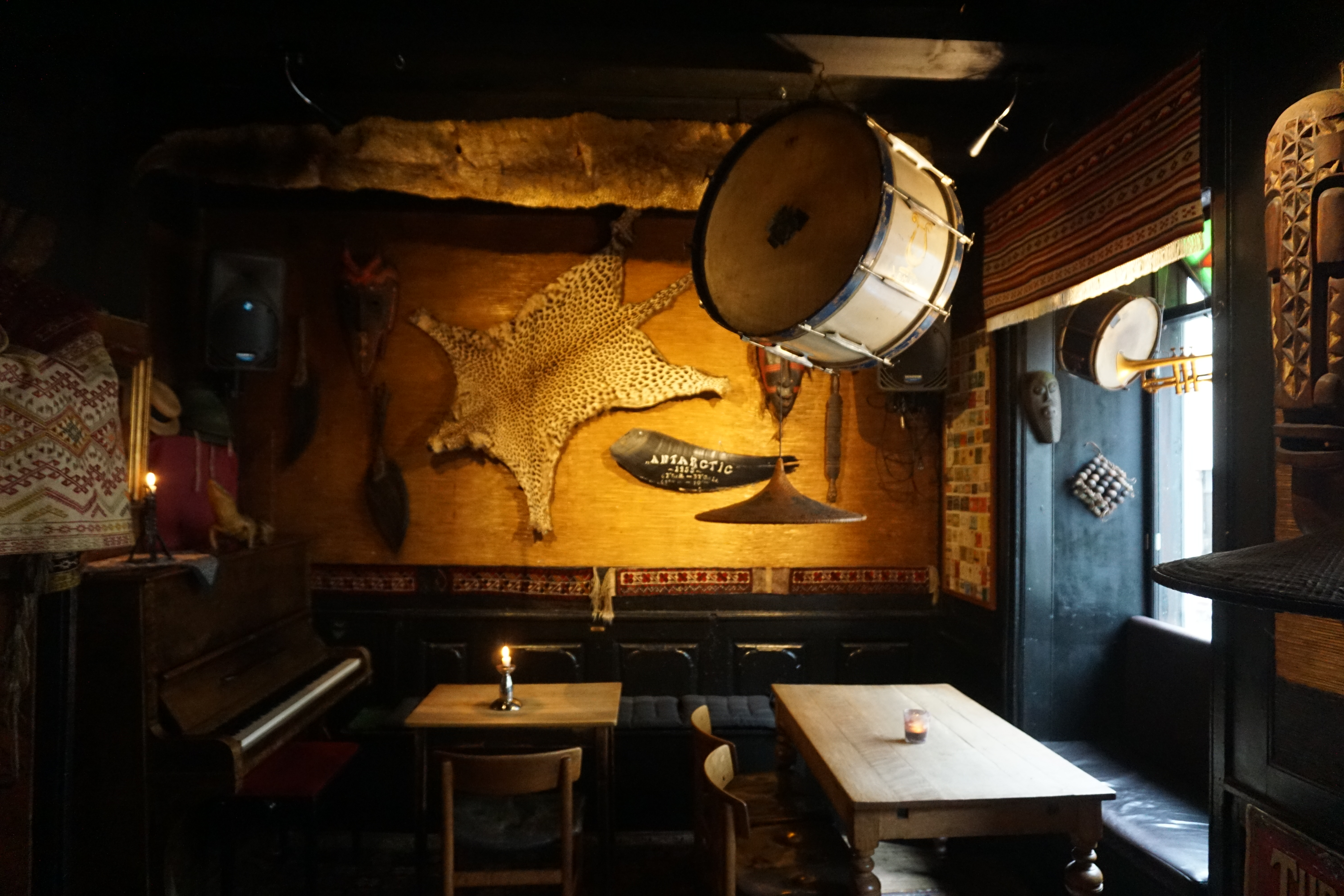
Galatheakroen.

Galatheakroen was opened by Ole Reimann in 1958. He had participated in the 2nd Galathea Expedition as a mess boy and the bar is decorated with a wealth of exotica and curiosities that he had brought home from the expedition. It initially served as a meeting place for former expedition members. It has been declared "worthy of preservation" (bevaringsværdig) by the National Museum for its eclectic décor. It boasts a collection of some 3,000 jazz and blues records.

== Today ==
The property was owned by Designgrafik Holding A/S as of 2008.
