= Peder Pedersen =

Peder Pedersen is the name of:

- Peder Pedersen (director) (born 1971)
- Peder Oluf Pedersen (1874–1941), Danish engineer and physicist
- Peder Ree Pedersen (1913–1976), Norwegian politician
- Peder Pedersen (musician), full name Peder Thomas Pedersen, Danish musician, see Danish Music Awards
- Peder Dorf Pedersen (1897–1967), Danish gymnast
- Peder Larsen Pedersen (1880–1966), Danish gymnast
- Peder Pedersen (cyclist) (1945–2015), represented Denmark at the 1972 Summer Olympics

== See also ==
- Peter Pedersen (disambiguation)
- Petter Pedersen (disambiguation)
