= Ólafur Ólafsson (disambiguation) =

Ólafur Ólafsson may refer to:

- Ólafur Ólafsson, Icelandic basketball player
- Ólafur Darri Ólafsson, Icelandic actor, producer, and screenwriter
- Ólafur Jóhann Ólafsson, Icelandic businessman, writer, and scientist
- Olav Olavsen, born Ólafur Ólafsson, a naturalized Norwegian jurist and architect
