= Admiral Petersen =

Admiral Petersen may refer to:

- Forrest S. Petersen (1922–1990), U.S. Navy vice admiral
- Peter Christian Petersen (1791–1853), Royal Norwegian Navy rear admiral
- Sigmund R. Petersen (fl. 1960s–1990s), NOAA Commissioned Officer Corps rear admiral
