= Peter Pedersen =

Peter Pedersen may refer to:

- Peter Pedersen (politician) (born 1954), Swedish politician
- Peter Dorf Pedersen (1897–1967), Danish gymnast
- Peter Pedersen (football manager), 2002–2003 Holbæk B&I manager

== See also ==
- Peter Peterson (disambiguation)
- Peter Petersen (disambiguation)
- Peder Pedersen (disambiguation)
- Petter Pedersen (disambiguation)
