= Bergylt =

Bergylt is a common name that may refer to either of two species of fish:

- The Ballan wrasse, Labrus bergylta
- The Rose fish, Sebastes norvegicus
