= Kongsberg School of Mines =

Mining school in Kongsberg, Norway

Coordinates: 59.6660°N 9.6453°E

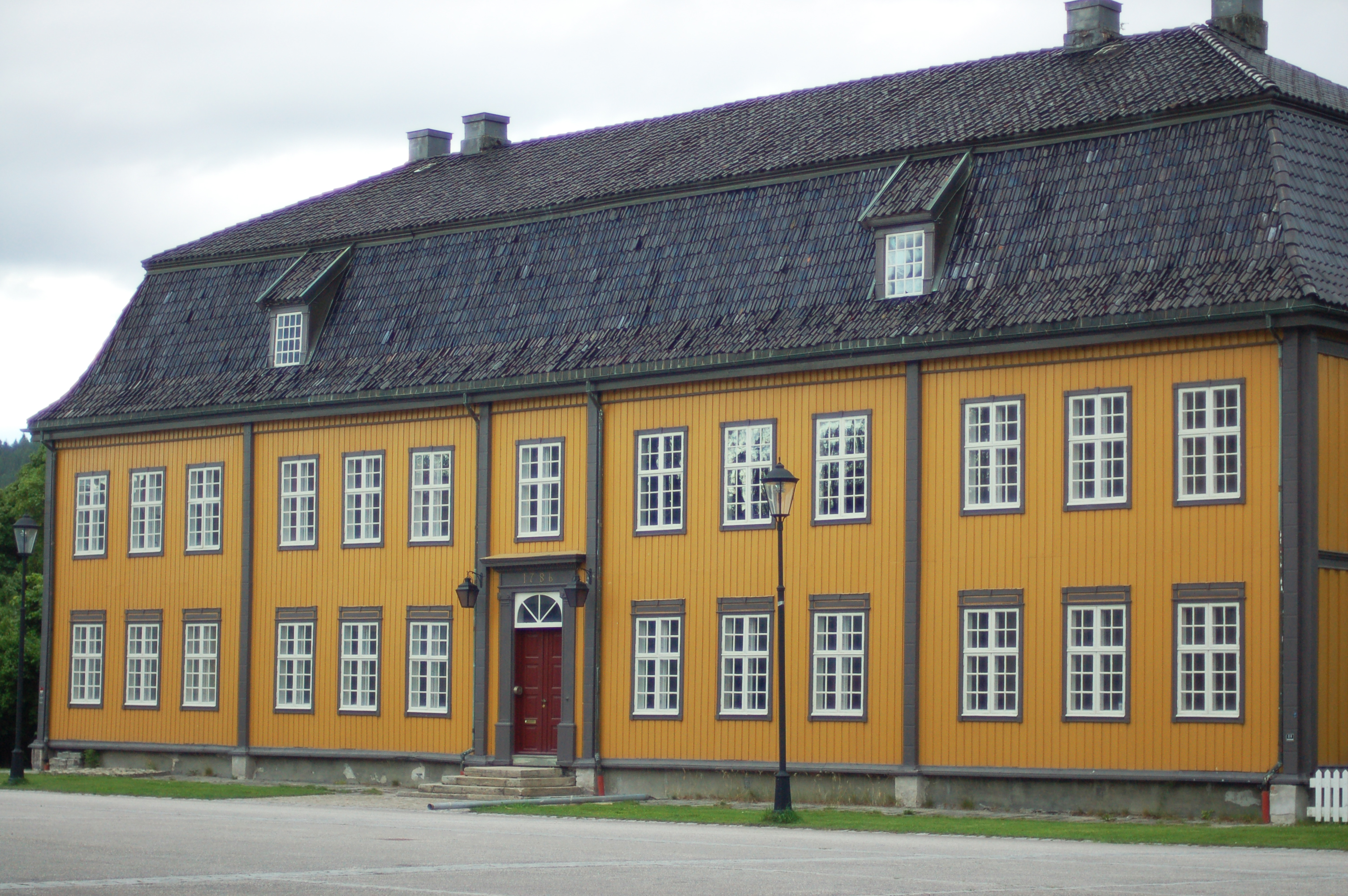
Bergseminaret, Kongsberg, Norway. The building dates from 1783, and was restored in the 2000s.

Kongsberg School of Mines (Norwegian: Det Kongelige Norske Bergseminarium, or Bergseminaret på Kongsberg, or Kongsberg bergseminar) was an academic institution for mining technology in Kongsberg, Norway from 1757 to 1814.

== History ==
At the 1769 Census, Kongsberg was the second largest city in Norway (after Bergen), with more than 8,000 inhabitants, and the number of employees at the Kongsberg Silver Mines exceeded 4,000.

In 1757, after an initiative from mining engineer Michael Heltzen and chemist and physician Johan Heinrich Becker, Det Kongelige Norske Berg-Seminarium was established by an Order in Council from Frederick V of Denmark dated 19 September 1757. The institution combined both practical and theoretical education related to mining. Among the theoretical subjects were mathematics (in particular geometry and trigonometry), mechanics (for construction of buildings and machinery), hydrostatics, hydraulics, physical chemistry, mineralogy, metallurgy and pyrotechnics. The new school building from 1783 has been preserved. The institution had a library of about 900 books on mining, mineralogy, chemistry, physics and mathematics.

The mining curricula were eventually transferred to Christiania, after the Universitas Regia Fredericiana was established (1811–). After the establishment of the Norwegian Institute of Technology in the 1910s, the education of mining engineers was further moved to Trondheim.

Today, the historical building is owned by the Kongsberg Group, which, in collaboration with the University of Southeast Norway (USN), plans to renovate the building into a modern center for knowledge and innovation, thereby helping to shape the technological landscape of the future.

== Notable alumni ==
- Erik Otto Knoph
- Jens Esmark
- Peter Petersen
- Paul Steenstrup

== Notable faculty ==
- Johan Heinrich Becker
- Peter Ascanius
- Peter Thorstensen
- Olav Olavsen
