= Peter Peterson =

Peter Peterson may refer to:

- Peter Oladf Peterson (1874–1941), Danish engineer and physicist
- Peter G. Peterson (1926–2018), American businessman, author, and politician
- Peter John Eli Peterson (1887–1962), American farmer, businessman, and politician
- Harding Peterson (1929–2019), known as Pete, American baseball player
- Pete Peterson (born 1935), American POW, US Congressman from Florida, and later ambassador to Vietnam
- Peter Peterson (Canadian politician) (born 1953), former Canadian Member of Parliament
- Pete Peterson (animator) (1903–1962), American motion picture special effects and stop-motion animation pioneer

== See also ==
- Peter Petersen (disambiguation)
- Peter Pedersen (disambiguation)
