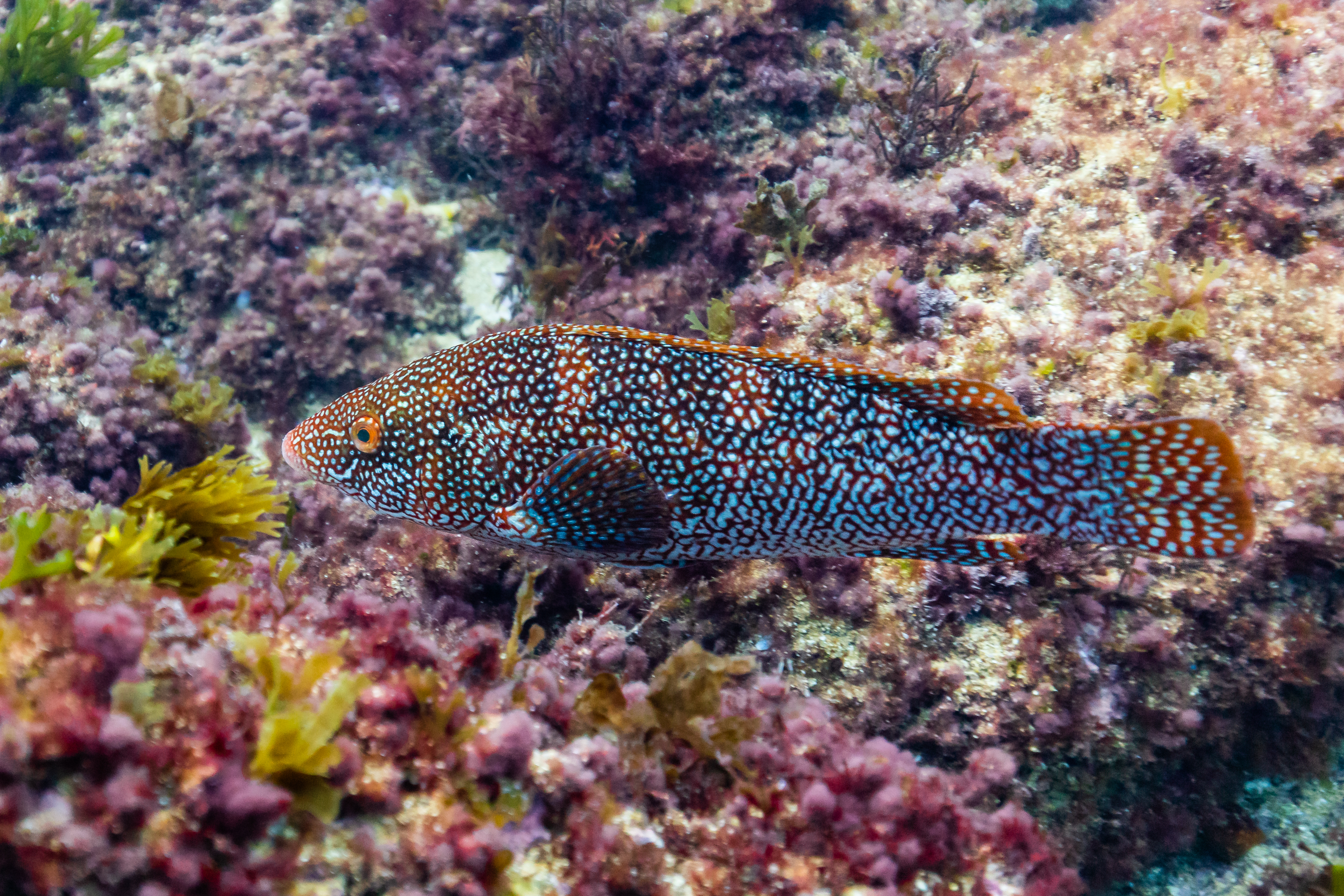
- In Spain

Conservation status
- Least Concern (IUCN 3.1)

Scientific classification
- Kingdom: Animalia
- Phylum: Chordata
- Class: Actinopterygii
- Division: Teleostei
- Order: Labriformes
- Family: Labridae
- Genus: Labrus
- Species: L. bergylta

Binomial name
- Labrus bergylta Ascanius, 1767

Synonyms
- List: Labrus comber Bonnaterre, 1788; Labrus ballan Bonnaterre, 1788; Labrus maculatus Bloch, 1792; Labrus neustriae Lacépède, 1801; Labrus balanus J. Fleming, 1828; Labrus variabilis W. Thompson, 1837; Crenilabrus multidentatus W. Thompson, 1837; Labrus reticulatus R. T. Lowe, 1839; Labrus donovani Valenciennes, 1839; Labrus nubilus Valenciennes, 1843

= Ballan wrasse =

Species of fish

The ballan wrasse (Labrus bergylta) is a species of marine ray-finned fish from the family Labridae, the wrasses. It is found in the eastern Atlantic Ocean, where it inhabits rocky areas. Like many wrasse species, it is a protogynous hermaphrodite—all fish start life as females, and some dominant fish later become males. It is used as a food fish in some areas and it is also finding use as a cleaner fish in the aquaculture of Atlantic salmon (Salmo salar) in northwestern Europe.

== Description ==
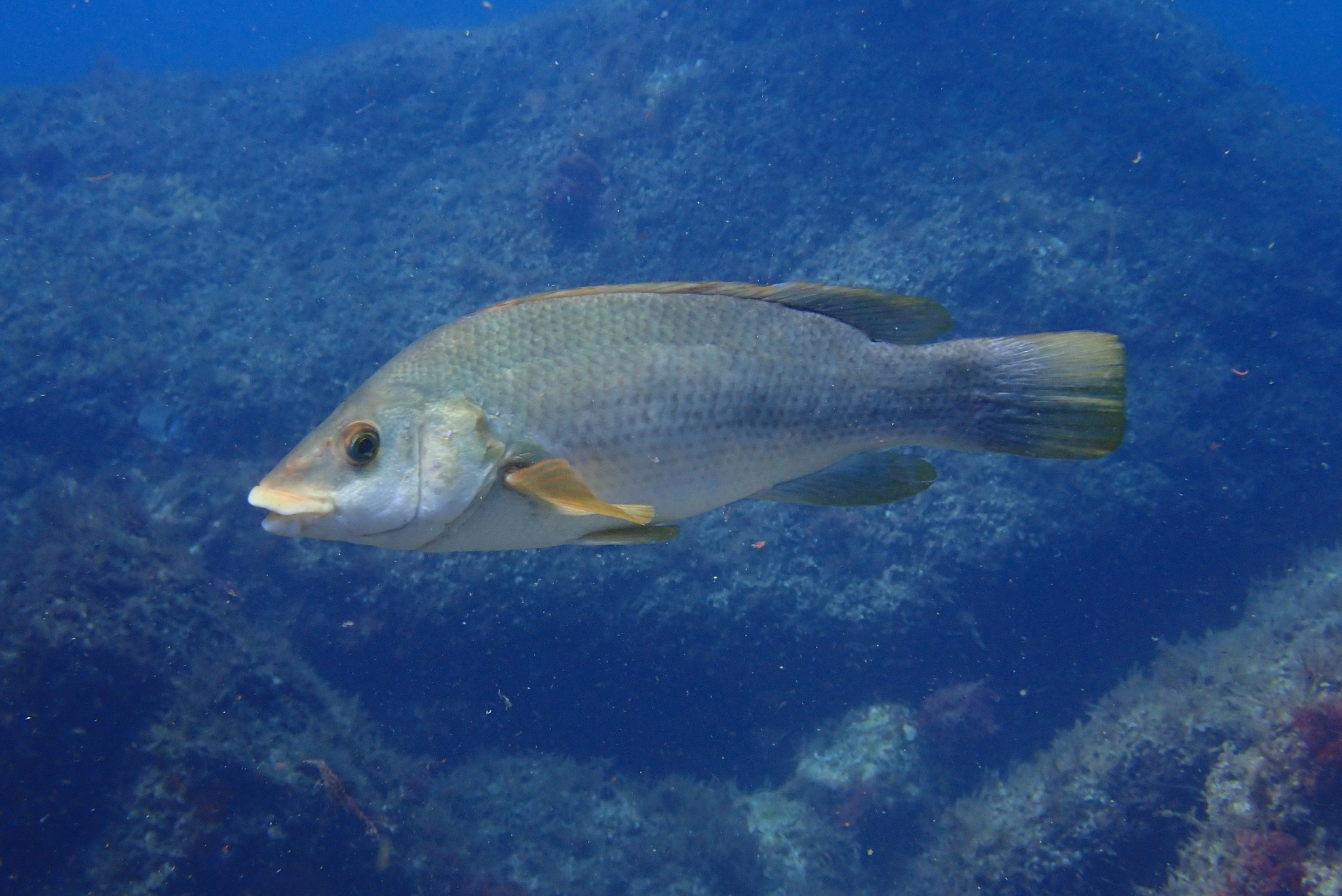
In Portugal

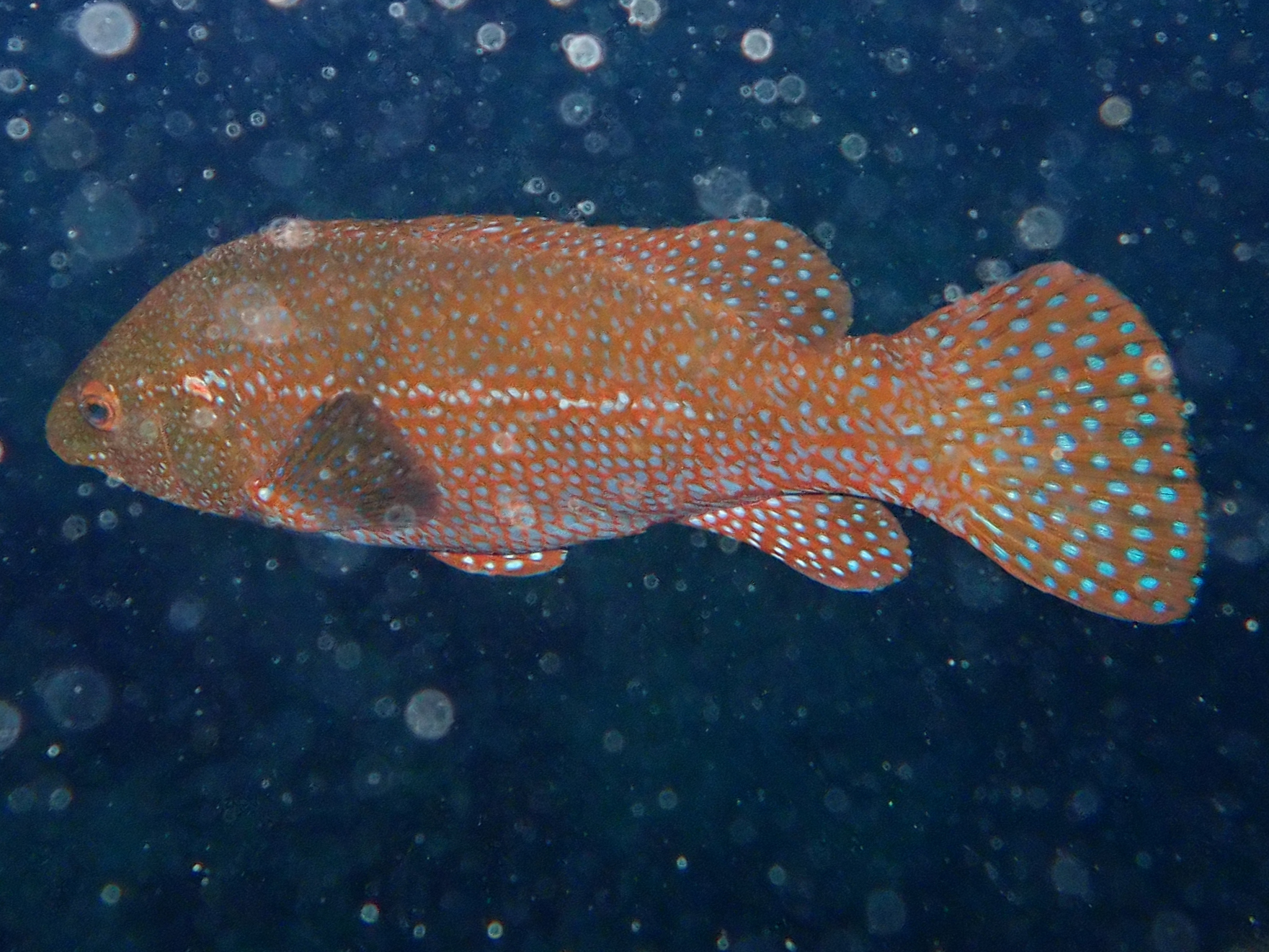
In France

The ballan wrasse is a large, heavy bodied wrasse with a relatively deep body and large head. It has a smallish mouth which is surrounded by thick, fleshy, rather wrinkled lips, and the jaws are armed with a single row of robust teeth which are sharp and pointed in young fish but blunter and more worn in older fish. It has a long dorsal fin which has 18–21 spines in its anterior portion and 9–13 branched rays in the rear part. The anal fin is markedly shorter and has three spines. It has large scales with 41–47 of them in the lateral line. The juvenile fish are coloured to match their habitat and vary in from light green to dark green, with some being described as bright emerald green.

Adult Ballan wrasse are highly variable in colouration, but have two main colour forms, which exist in sympatry with each other. One is plain green or brown, and the other is reddish with white spots. This is not a result of sexual dimorphism, as males and females can both exhibit either colour form. Spotted Ballan wrasse grow larger than plain coloured individuals. The two colour forms are commercialized separately in places such as Galicia, where local fishermen often treat them as separate species.

It can grow to 65.9 cm (25.9 in) in total length (though most do not exceed 50 cm (20 in) standard length), and the greatest recorded weight of this species is 4.4 kg (9.7 lb). Ballan wrasses are protogynous hermaphrodites.

Ballan wrasse are classic labriform swimmers, primarily swimming with their pectoral fins and utilising burst and glide swimming strategies for greater speed, though they struggle with sustained swimming.

== Distribution ==
Ballan wrasse are native to the northeastern Atlantic Ocean from Norway to Morocco, including the islands of Madeira, the Azores and the Canary Islands. There are records from the Mediterranean Sea but these are regarded as questionable and may be misidentifications of the brown wrasse (Labrus merula).

== Habitat and biology ==
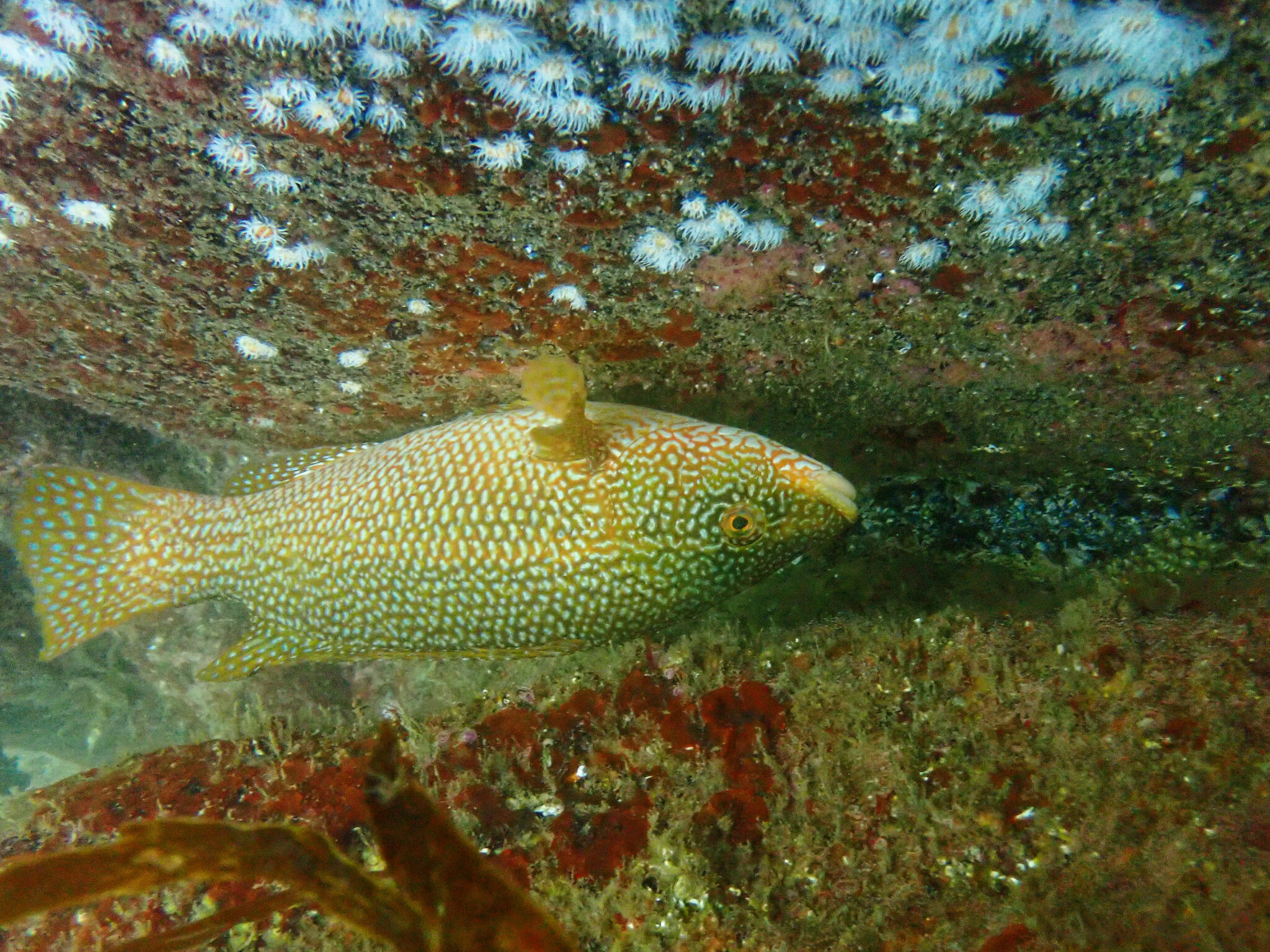
Upside down Ballan wrasse. In Trégunc, France

They can be found at depths from 1 to 50 m (3.3 to 164.0 ft) amongst rocks, seaweed and reefs. All ballan wrasses are female for their first four to 14 years before a few change into males. Large fish of the species are almost certainly male. The thick lips and sharp front teeth of the ballan wrasse are an adaptation for extracting shellfish from rocks. These are supplemented by powerful pharyngeal teeth which are placed further back in the throat and which can break up shells to access flesh inside. This species also feeds on crustaceans and their diet includes hard-shelled crabs and small lobsters. They will swim into shallower water so that they can prey on the shellfish which cling to underwater cliff faces and inshore rocks. They will also inhabit areas with good covering of kelp and other seaweeds. The male builds a nest of algae in a crevice in the rocks in which one or more females lay eggs. The male defends the nest until the eggs hatch into pelagic larvae after a week or two. The species has been recorded living for up to 34 year.

Ballan wrasse do not have stomachs.

== Human usage ==
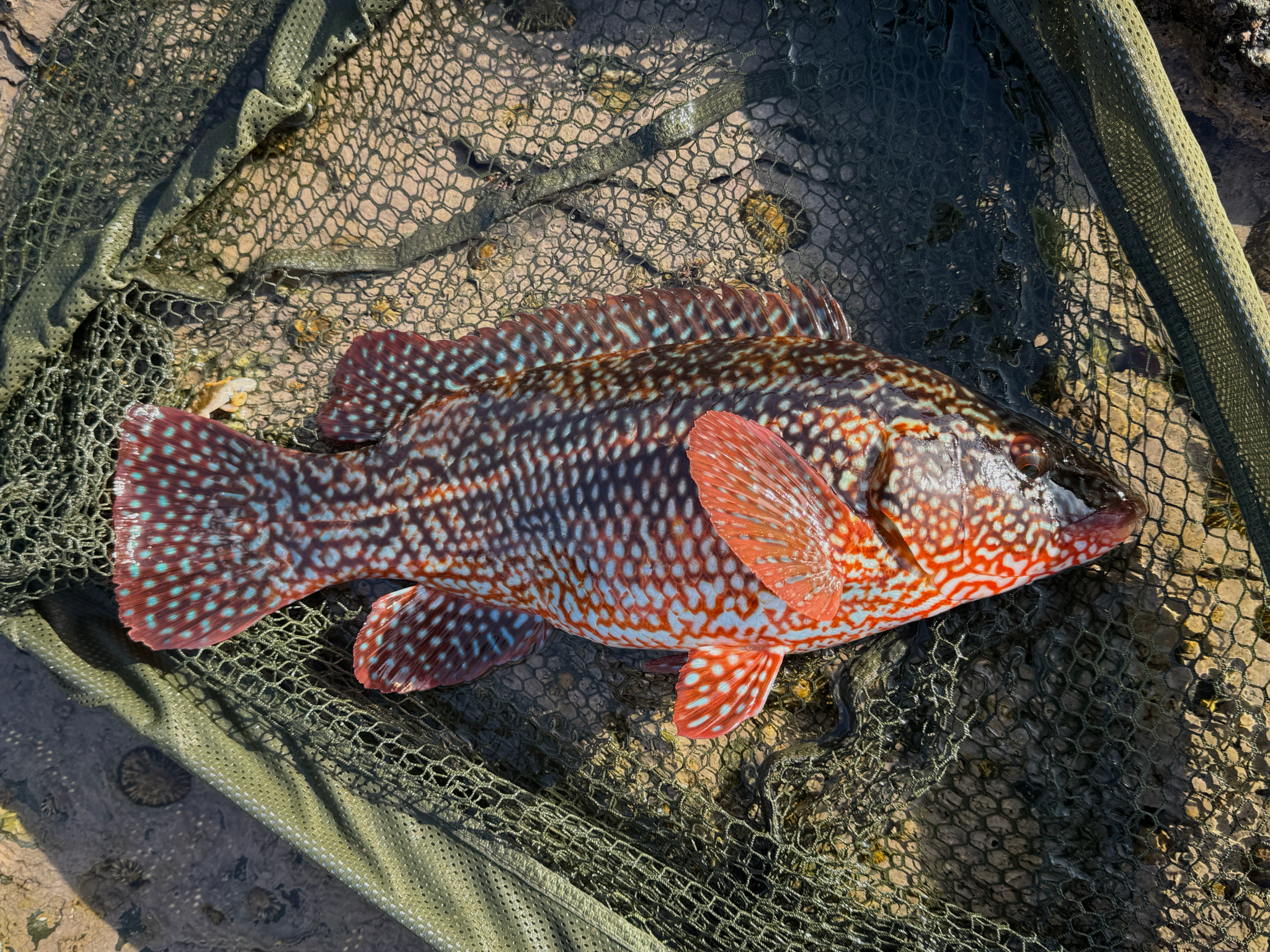
In England

=== Fishery and sport ===
Crates of Ballan wrasse, in England

This species is popular as a food fish in the Orkney Islands off the north-eastern coast of Scotland, and in Galway, a county in the west of Ireland. However, it is not highly regarded as a food fish in much of the UK and Ireland. In recent years, it has become a popular catch-and-release target for sport fishermen using light fishing tackle, particularly those employing soft plastic lures.

=== Aquaculture ===
This fish is one of 5 key species used as cleaner fish to remove sea lice from Norwegian and Scottish farmed salmon, with 3,317,000 fish used in Atlantic salmon and rainbow trout sea pens in 2020 in Norway alone. Along with lumpfish, this species is farmed for this purpose as there were concerns regarding overharvest of wild populations.

As with many farmed marine species, commercial larval rearing utilises live prey before transitioning to dry feeds after metamorphosis is complete. The majority of the industry currently uses enriched rotifers and Artemia, but copepod nauplii (Acartia tonsa) and barnacle nauplii (Semibalanus balanoides) are becoming more common as alternatives.

This species can also be found in the aquarium trade.
