= Petter Pedersen =

Petter Pedersen can refer to:

- Petter Pedersen (footballer), a Norwegian footballer
- Petter Mørland Pedersen, a Norwegian sailor

== See also ==
- Peder Pedersen (disambiguation)
- Peter Pedersen (disambiguation)
