= Peter Thorstensen =

Danish physician and chemist

Peter Thorstensen (1752–1792) was a Danish physician and chemist who settled in Norway living during the time of Denmark-Norway.

He was born in Denmark to immigrants from Iceland, and studied medicine in Copenhagen. His doctoral thesis in 1775 examined medical use of quassin from the plant quassia amara. He was appointed as physician (Norwegian: bergmedicus) in Kongsberg, at the Kongsberg Silver Mines. From 1784 he lectured at the Kongsberg School of Mines, in chemistry, physics and mineralogy.
