= Johan Heinrich Becker =

German physician and chemist (1715–1761)

Johan Heinrich Becker (18 December 1715 – 21 February 1761) was a German physician and chemist who settled in Norway.

He was born in Aurich, East Frisia, and graduated as medical doctor in 1736. He was appointed as physician (Norwegian: bergmedicus) in Kongsberg in 1742. From 1757 he lectured at the Kongsberg School of Mines, in chemistry and mineralogy, and was the first public chemistry teacher in Norway. He died in Kongsberg in 1761.
