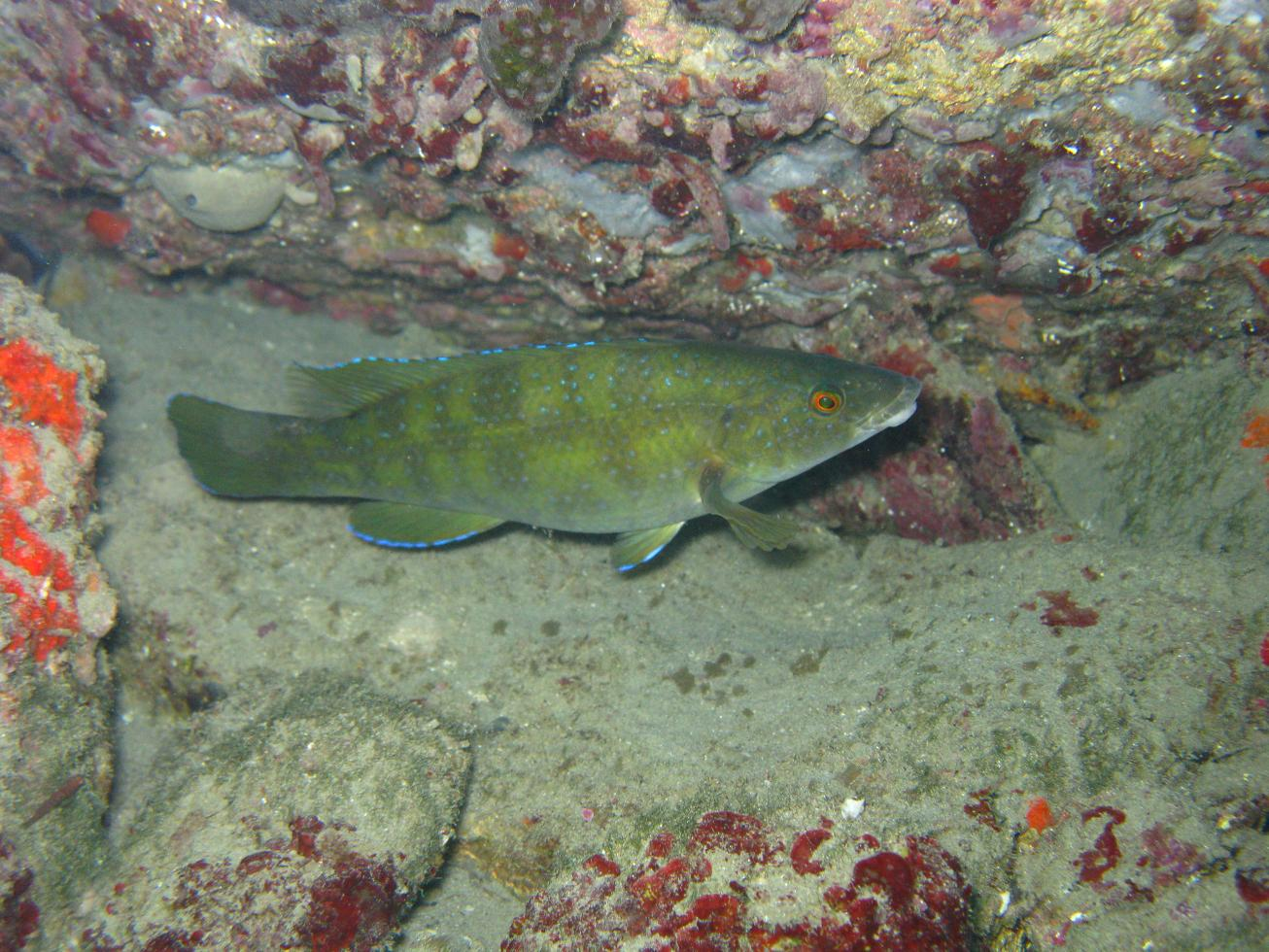

Conservation status
- Least Concern (IUCN 3.1)

Scientific classification
- Kingdom: Animalia
- Phylum: Chordata
- Class: Actinopterygii
- Order: Labriformes
- Family: Labridae
- Genus: Labrus
- Species: L. merula

Binomial name
- Labrus merula Linnaeus, 1758

Synonyms
- Labrus livens Linnaeus, 1758; Labrus nereus A. Risso, 1810; Labrus psittacus A. Risso, 1827; Labrus limbatus Valenciennes, 1839; Labrus saxorum Valenciennes, 1839; Labrus lineolatus Valenciennes, 1839

= Brown wrasse =

Species of fish

The brown wrasse (Labrus merula) is a species of wrasse native to the Eastern Atlantic from Portugal to Morocco, including the Azores, as well as in the Mediterranean Sea. This species can reach 45 cm (18 in) in standard length, though most do not exceed more than 40 cm (16 in).

== Description ==
Labrus merula grows to a maximum length of 45 cm (18 in).

Body is moderately elongated, head is broad, shorter or equal to the body depth, with light blue spots. It has strong, canine-like teeth which are rounded in older specimens.

Young specimens are green or brownish with light spots, belly is paler, yellow-greyish. Some specimens have a blue-white longitudinal stripe on sides. Old specimens are dark blue, sometimes dark green or brownish. Soft part of dorsal, anal and caudal fins are outlined with light blue stripe.

Smaller specimens form small, loose schools, but larger and older specimens are found solitary.

It feeds on sea urchins, ophiuroids, mollusks, crabs and worms.

Maturity occurs after two years at lengths between 15 cm (5.9 in) and 20 cm (7.9 in). At age of 7, males measure around 31.5 cm (12.4 in) and females around 30 cm (12 in). Maximum age is around 16–17 years.

This species spawns from February to May in the western Mediterranean Sea. Demersal eggs are laid amongst rocks and seagrasses and are protected by the males.

It is important to local populations as a food fish and can also be found in the aquarium trade.

== Distribution and habitat ==
The brown wrasse can be found in Eastern Atlantic from Portugal to Morocco, including the Azores, as well as in the Mediterranean Sea, throughout the entire area except for the eastern Levantine and Black Sea.

It can be found on reefs around rocks, amongst seaweeds and in seagrass beds between shallows and 50 m (160 ft).

Threats to this species include habitat degradation, specifically the reduction of Posidonia seagrass beds, however, the population has not shown any serious signs of decline.

== Fishing ==
In artisanal fishing it is often caught in small quantities using nets and longlines, all year long, but much better from the Spring to the end of the Autumn.

In recreational fishing it is often caught on rod and reel and on the handline. As bait, various worms and crabs can be used, as well as small chunks of fish.

When found in the shallows, it can be caught using a speargun, especially larger specimens.

== Cuisine ==
The fish's meat is soft and tender. Larger specimens may be barbequed or eaten in a soup; small specimens are fried.
