= Olav Olavsen =

Norwegian jurist and architect

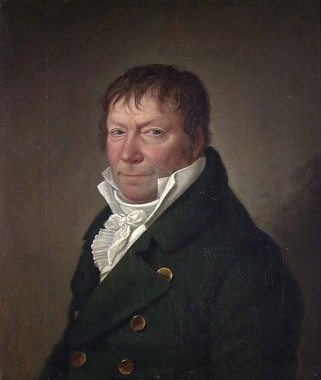
Portrait of Olav Olavsen (ca.1820) by Jacob Munch

Olav Olavsen (née Ólafur Ólafsson; 25 December 1753 – 20 January 1832) was a naturalized Norwegian jurist and architect.

He was born in Tverá, Skagafjörður, Iceland to farmers Ólafur Jónsson and Kristín Björnsdóttir, and was educated at the Royal Danish Academy of Fine Arts in Copenhagen. From 1784 he lectured at the Kongsberg School of Mines, in mathematics and drawing, later also in jurisprudence, and was appointed professor from 1794. As architect, it is regarded that he had significant influence on the development of the mining city of Kongsberg. He was elected to the Storting in 1814, 1815 and 1818. He was decorated Knight of the Swedish Order of Vasa in 1822.
