= Peter Petersen (born 1767) =

Norwegian mining engineer, ironworks manager and politician

Peter Petersen (1767–1850) was a Norwegian mining engineer, ironworks manager and politician.

He graduated from the Kongsberg School of Mines in 1793, was appointed bergraad in Kongsberg, and was the director of Fritzøe Jernverk in Laurvig. Petersen was elected to the Storting in 1827, representing the constituency of Jarlsberg og Laurviks Amt.
