= Peter Christian Petersen =

Norwegian naval officer

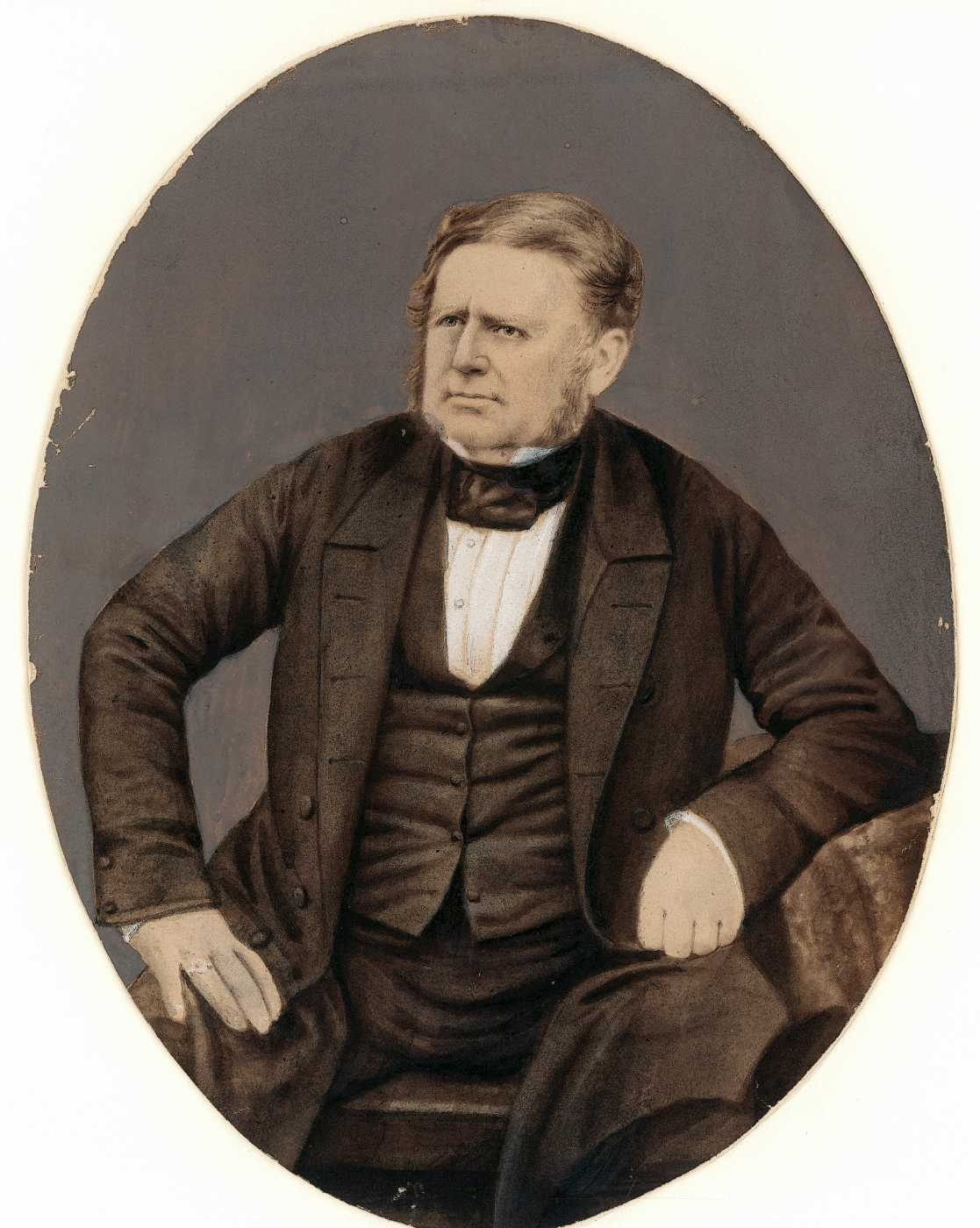
Peter Christian Petersen

Peter Christian Petersen (22 June 1791 – 4 July 1853) was a Norwegian naval officer.

He was born in Christianssand, and was a brother of Hans Petersen. In December 1819 he married Betzy Mørch (1799–1875), a daughter of Constitutional Founding Father Ole Clausen Mørch.

In 1808, during the Gunboat War, he was given the rank of Second Lieutenant in the Royal Danish-Norwegian Navy. He was stationed on the brig Kiel from 1811, and became second-in-command there in 1812. In the same year he participated in the Battle of Lyngør. He took over the command of Kiel in 1814.

In 1814 the Royal Norwegian Navy was re-established, and Petersen was made Premier Lieutenant here in 1815. He was promoted to Lieutenant Captain in 1821 and Captain in 1825. He was an aide-de-camp of King Charles III John for some years, and commanded the ship Ørnen from 1840 and Freia from 1844. From 1843 to 1844 he was also acting director of Fredriksvern Verft. He was also a member of several public commissions. In 1845 Petersen reached the rank of Rear Admiral. He succeeded Jochum Nicolai Müller, and commanded the Navy until his death, which occurred in July 1853 in Kristiania.
