= Peder Dorf Pedersen =

Danish artistic gymnast (1897–1967)

- Born: 28 January 1897 Rostrup, Denmark
- Died: 13 September 1967 (aged 70)

Gymnastics career
- Discipline: Men's artistic gymnastics
- Country represented: Denmark
Medal record
Men's artistic gymnastics
Representing Denmark
Olympic Games
Silver medal – second place	1920 Antwerp	Team, Swedish system

Peder Dorf Pedersen (28 January 1897 in Rostrup, Mariagerfjord Municipality, Denmark – 13 September 1967) was a Danish gymnast who competed in the 1920 Summer Olympics. He was part of the Danish team, which won the silver medal in the gymnastics men's team, Swedish system event in 1920.
