= Peter Ascanius =

Norwegian-Danish scientist

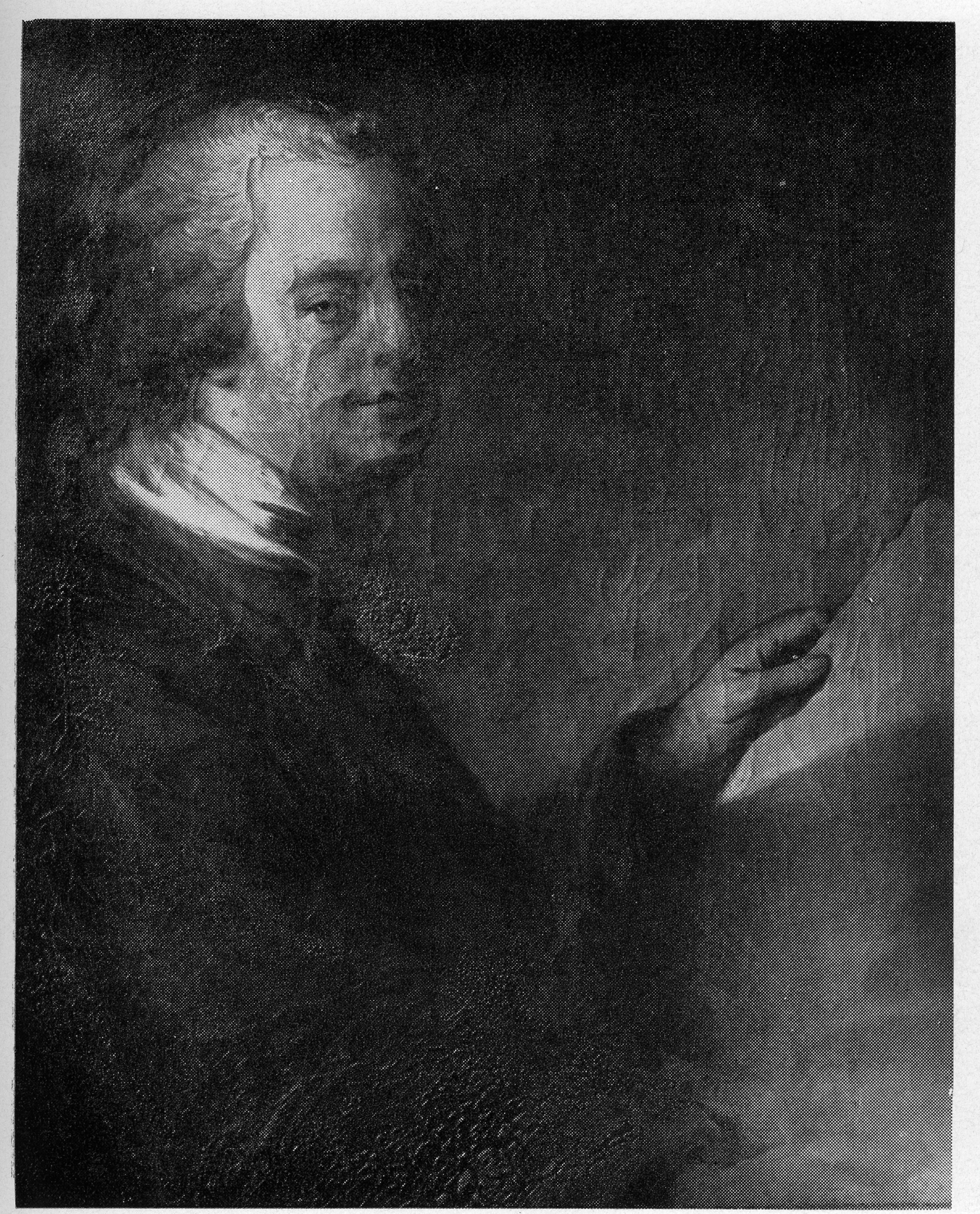
- Born: 24 May 1723; Aure, Romsdalen, Norway.
- Died: 4 June 1803 (aged 80); Copenhagen, Denmark
- Citizenship: Norwegian
- Scientific career
- Fields: Biologist
- Academic advisors: Carl Linnaeus; Johan Gottschalk Wallerius

Peter Ascanius (24 May 1723 – 4 June 1803) was a Norwegian-Danish biologist and geologist. He was a professor of zoology and mineralogy.

== Early life and education ==
He was born at Aure in Romsdalen county, Norway. In 1742 he graduated from Trondheim Cathedral School and attended the University of Copenhagen where he studied medicine and took a Bachelor's degree in 1747. From 1752 he stayed a couple of years at Uppsala University where he was a student of Carl Linnaeus (1707–1778). He studied natural history with Linnaeus and chemistry and metallurgy with Johan Gottschalk Wallerius (1709–1785). Ascanius undertook a study trip in the years 1753 to 1758, visiting the Netherlands, England, France, Italy and Austria.

== Career ==
After returning from his European study trip, in 1759, Ascanius was appointed professor of natural history at the Royal Danish Academy of Fine Arts which was established at Charlottenborg at Copenhagen in 1754. He taught zoology and mineralogy in Copenhagen from 1759 to 1771. In 1768 he was sent on a research and collection trip along the Norwegian coast from Kristiansand to Bergen. In 1753, Ascanius visited the iron deposit Taberg in Småland.

In the years 1771–1776, he worked as a mining inspector at the silver mines in Kongsberg. During the period 1776–1788, he was made a senior mining official (Berghauptmann) and was given responsibility for iron smelting and hammering at the Kongsberg Silver Mines and teaching at the Kongsberg School of Mines.

== Late life and death ==
Ascanius returned to Copenhagen in 1788. He died unmarried on 4 June 1803 and is buried in the crypt of Frederick's German Church in Christianshavn.

== Publications ==
Among his published works was the five-volume illustrated Icones rerum naturalium. He was a Fellow of the Royal Society, elected in 1755 as a Foreign Member.

== See also ==
- Category:Taxa named by Peter Ascanius
