= António Vitorino =

Portuguese lawyer and politician

António Vitorino GCC
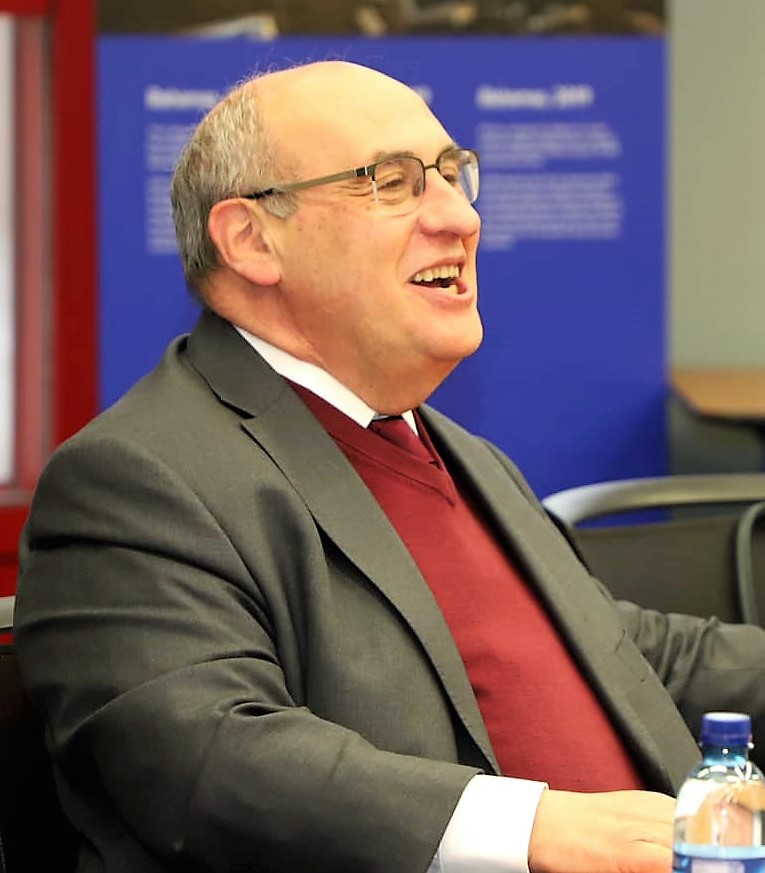
- Vitorino in 2023

10th Director General of the International Organization for Migration
- In office 29 June 2018 – 29 September 2023
- Preceded by: William L. Swing
- Succeeded by: Amy Pope

European Commissioner for Justice and Home Affairs
- In office 13 September 1999 – 31 October 2004
- President: Romano Prodi
- Preceded by: Anita Gradin
- Succeeded by: Franco Frattini

Minister of the Presidency
- In office 28 October 1995 – 25 November 1997
- Prime Minister: António Guterres
- Preceded by: Fernando Nogueira
- Succeeded by: Jorge Coelho

Minister of Defence
- In office 28 October 1995 – 25 November 1997
- Prime Minister: António Guterres
- Preceded by: António Figueiredo Lopes
- Succeeded by: José Veiga Simão

Judge of the Constitutional Court
- In office 2 August 1989 – 10 March 1994
- Appointed by: Assembly of the Republic
- Preceded by: Armando Marques Guedes
- Succeeded by: Maria Fernanda Pereira

Member of the Assembly of the Republic
- In office 10 March 2005 – 14 October 2009
- Constituency: Setúbal
- In office 31 October 1995 – 12 September 1999
- Constituency: Setúbal
- In office 5 October 1980 – 1 August 1989
- Constituency: Porto (1980–1985); Braga (1985–1987); Guarda (1987–1989)

Personal details
- Born: António Manuel de Carvalho Ferreira Vitorino; 12 January 1957 (age 69) Lisbon, Portugal
- Party: Socialist Party; UEDS (1978-1985)
- Spouse: Maria de Aguiar
- Children: 2
- Education: University of Lisbon
- Occupation: Lawyer • Politician
- Awards: Decoration of Honour for Services to the Republic of Austria (2002); Ordem Militar de Cristo (2014); Order of Prince Henry (2023)

António Manuel de Carvalho Ferreira Vitorino (born 12 January 1957) is a Portuguese lawyer and politician of the Socialist Party (PS).

== Career ==
=== Career in national politics ===
Vitorino graduated in law from the University of Lisbon. A lawyer by training, he was first elected to the Assembly of the Republic (Portugal), the national parliament, in the 1980 elections. In 1983, he served as Secretary of State for Parliamentary Affairs, a junior minister role in the grand coalition government led by Prime Minister Mário Soares. After the government's defeat in the 1985 elections, Vitorino became a deputy secretary for the Governor of Macau.

In 1989, Vitorino returned to Lisbon to become a judge of the Constitutional Court, ending his term in 1994.

In 1995, Vitorino became Minister for National Defence and Deputy Prime Minister in the first government of António Guterres. He resigned in 1997 for being suspected of tax evasion.

=== Member of the European Commission, 1998–2004 ===
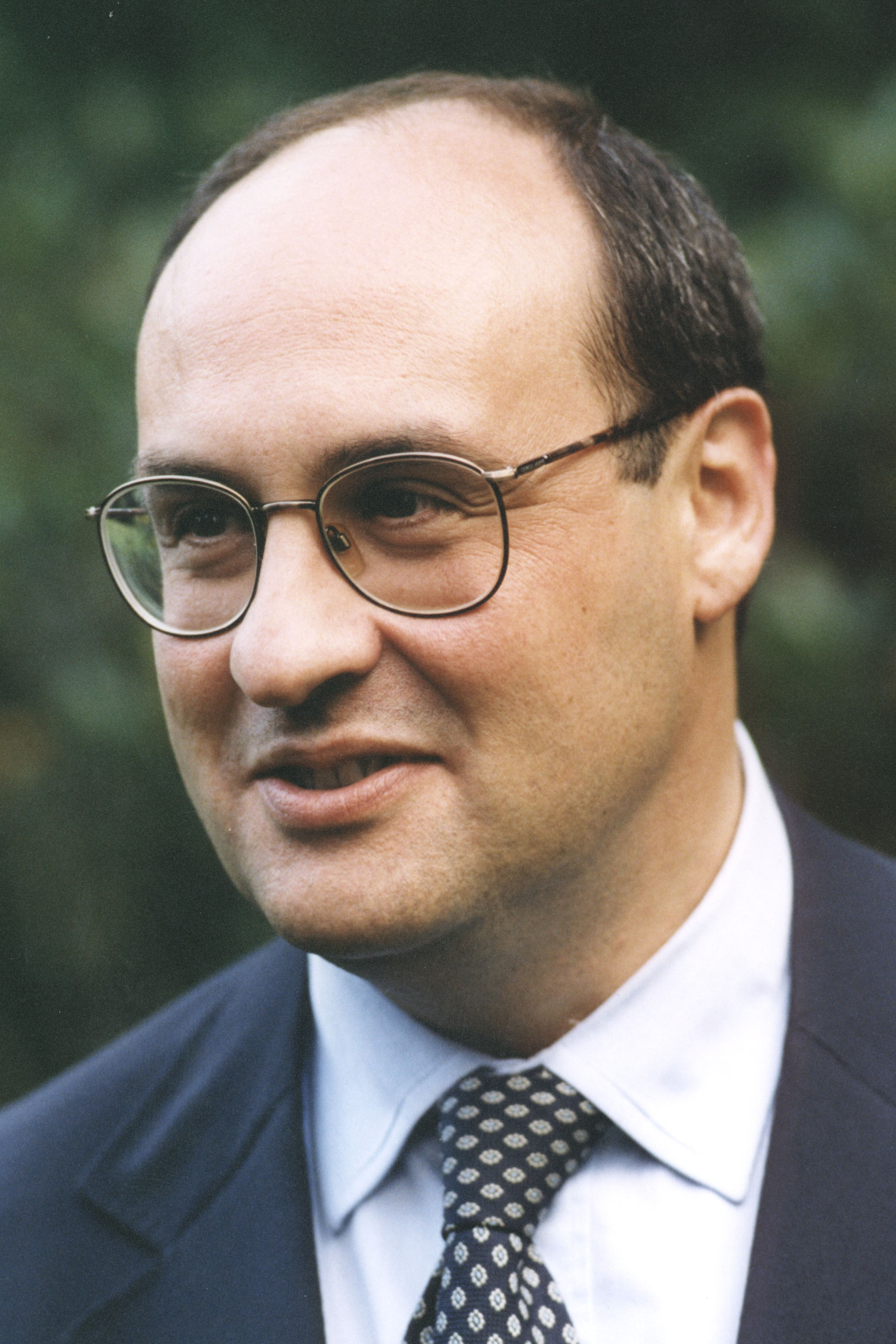
Official portrait, 1999

After being cleared of the charges, Vitorino was appointed European Commissioner for Justice and Home Affairs, during the commission led by President Romano Prodi. As a representative of the European Commission, he took part in the conversations that drew up the Charter of Fundamental Rights of the European Union and the Convention on the Future of Europe. At the convention, he chaired a reflection group on the European Court of Justice.

When Guterres ruled himself out of the contest for the role of President of the European Commission in June 2004, he instead threw his support behind Vitorino. The post eventually went to José Manuel Barroso. José Sócrates become the new leader of the party instead of Vitorino, going on to win a majority in the 2005 general election.

=== Career in the private sector ===
In 2005, Vitorino became a partner at Cuatrecasas, Gonçalves Pereira & Associados, one of the most influential law firms in the Iberian Peninsula. Between 2006 and 2007, he served as member of the Amato Group, a group of high-level European politicians unofficially working on rewriting the Treaty establishing a Constitution for Europe into what became known as the Treaty of Lisbon following its rejection by French and Dutch voters.

From November 2008 until June 2009, Vitorino served as member of a six-member panel of EU experts advising the Bulgarian government. Set up by Bulgaria's Prime Minister Sergei Stanishev, the advisory board was chaired by Dominique de Villepin and mandated to recommend ways to help the country adjust to EU membership.

Vitorino was the President of Notre Europe, the European think tank founded by Jacques Delors, from 2011 until 2016. From December 2011 until May 2012, he served as member of the institute's Tommaso Padoa-Schioppa group, a high-level expert group to reflect on the reform of the Economic and Monetary Union of the European Union.

Vitorino also had an ongoing role as commentator for RTP 1's programme Notas Soltas hosted by television journalist Judite Sousa.

In 2017 Vitorino was part of the advisory boards of the "International Migration Initiative" (Open Society Foundations) and the "Transatlantic Council on Migration" (Migration Policy Institute).

=== International Organization for Migration, 2018–2023 ===
In December 2017, the Portuguese government under the leadership of Prime Minister António Costa put forward Vitorino for the post of Director General of the International Organization for Migration (IOM), as successor of William Lacy Swing. On 29 June 2018, the member states of IOM elected Vitorino as Director General, effective October 2018. He was chosen over American Ken Isaacs, who was eliminated in early voting rounds, and by acclamation over the runner-up, Laura Thompson of Costa Rica. When seeking a second term, he opted to step down after the first round of voting. Amy Pope of the United States subsequently became the first woman to be elected as Director General.

== Other activities ==
=== Corporate boards ===
- Banco Caixa Geral Angola (BCGA), Chairman of the Shareholders' General Meeting
- Áreas Portugal, chairman of the Board
- Siemens Portugal, Non-Executive Director
- Brisa, President of the General Assembly (since 2007)
- Novabase, Chairman of the Shareholders Meeting
- Tabaqueira Indústria, Chairman of the Supervisory Board
- Banco Santander Totta, Chairman of the Shareholders Meeting (2005-2016), Member of the Board of Directors
- CTT Correios de Portugal, S.A., Member of the Board (until 2016)

=== Non-profit organizations ===
- International Gender Champions (IGC), Member (since 2018)
- International Migration Initiative, chairman of the Advisory Board
- European Strategy Forum, Co-chairman (jointly with Peter Ludlow and Vladimir Drobnjak, since 2006)
- European Council on Foreign Relations (ECFR), Member of the Strategy Group of the Foreign Policy Scorecard
- New Pact for Europe, Member of the Advisory Group
- World Justice Project, Honorary Co-chair
- Migration Policy Institute (MPI), Member of the Transatlantic Council on Migration (since 2007)
- Portuguese Bar Association, Member
- Fundação Res Publica, Member of the Board of Directors
- Trilateral Commission, Member of the European Group
- European Policy Centre, Chairman of the Governing Board (2005-2009), Member of the Strategic Council
- Fundação Arpad Szenes e Vieira da Silva, President (2007-2010)

== Recognition ==
- 2002 – Grand Decoration of Honour in Gold with Sash for Services to the Republic of Austria

== Personal life ==
Vitorino is married and has two sons.

== Electoral history ==
=== European Parliament election, 1994 ===
Ballot: 12 June 1994
Party	Candidate	Votes	%	Seats	+/−
PS	António Vitorino	1,061,560	34.9	10	+3
PSD	Eurico de Melo	1,046,918	34.4	9	±0
CDS–PP	Manuel Monteiro	379,044	12.5	3	±0
CDU	Luis Manuel de Sá	340,725	11.2	3	–1
Other parties		121,498	4.0	0	–1
Blank/Invalid ballots		94,236	3.1	–	–
Turnout		3,044,001	35.54	25	+1
Source: Comissão Nacional de Eleições
