= Amy Pope =

Attorney and director general of IOM (born 1974)

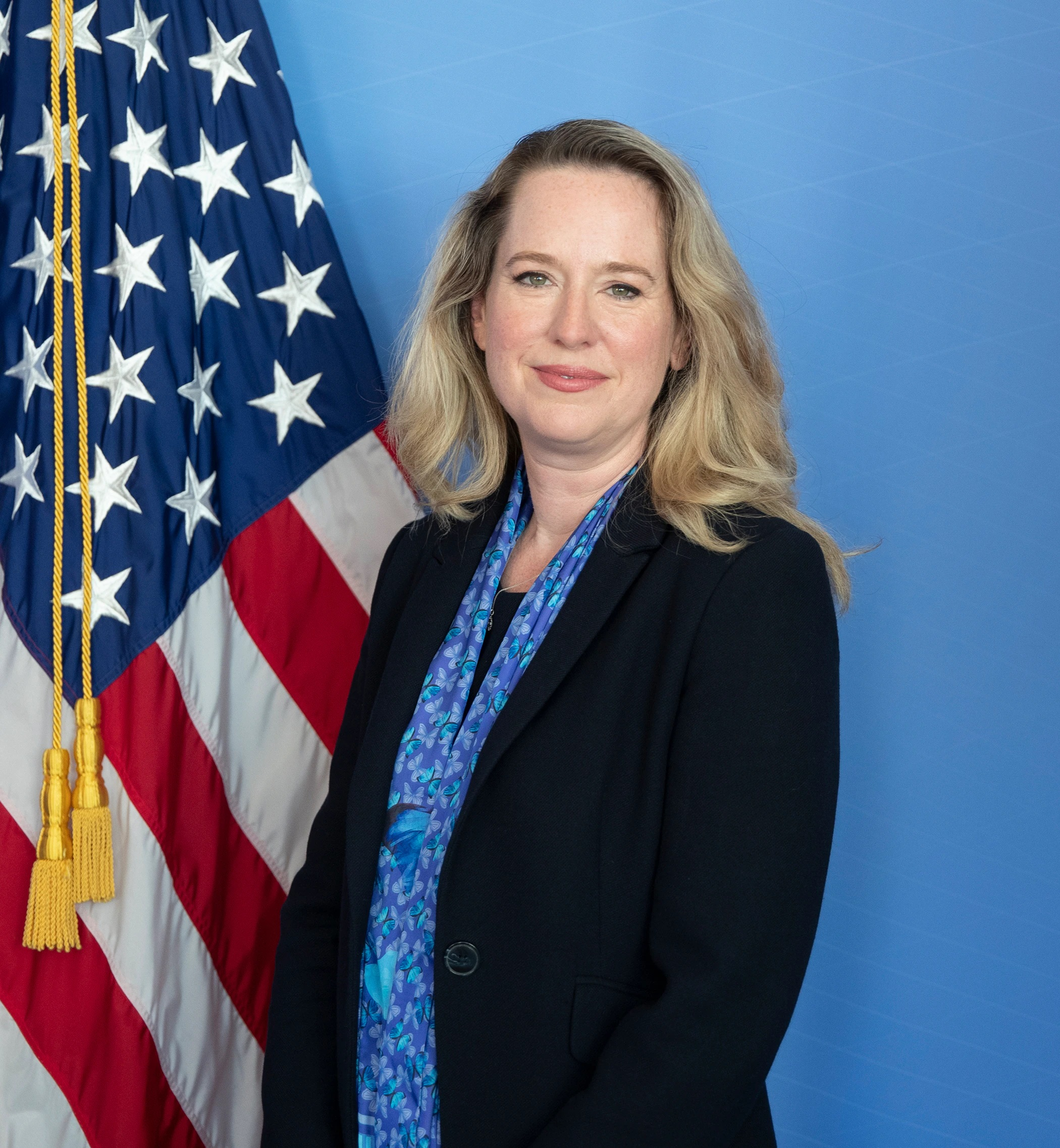
- Pope in 2023

11th Director General of the International Organization for Migration
- Incumbent
- Assumed office October 1, 2023
- Deputy: Ugochi Daniels; SungAh Lee
- Preceded by: António Vitorino

Deputy Homeland Security Advisor
- In office 2015–2017
- President: Barack Obama
- Vice President: Joe Biden
- Preceded by: Rand Beers
- Succeeded by: Office vacant (Note: After Pope left office as Deputy Homeland Security Advisor, the National Security Council was reconstructed under Donald Trump, which left the office vacant for months, meaning nobody directly succeeded her.)

Senior Advisor to the President of the United States
- In office 2021 – July 2021
- President: Joe Biden
- Vice President: Kamala Harris
- Preceded by: Roberta Jacobson
- Succeeded by: Tyler Moran

Attorney for the United States Department of Justice
- In office 2010–2012

Personal details
- Born: Amy Eileen Pope; March 1974 (age 52) Cleveland, Ohio, U.S.
- Children: 2
- Education: Duke University School of Law; (BA)
- Occupation: Attorney; trial attorney; federal prosecutor
- Years active: 1990s–present

Amy Eileen Pope (born March 1974) is an American attorney, federal prosecutor, former member of the U.S. Department of Justice Legislative Detailee, coordinator of the United Nations Network on Migration, and Director General of the International Organization for Migration, becoming the first woman to serve as it. Born and raised in Cleveland, Ohio, and Pittsburgh, Pennsylvania, Pope went to Duke University School of Law, where she earned her Bachelor of Arts in political science, later graduating in 2001 and becoming a prosecuting attorney in the Civil Rights Division for the United States Department of Justice.

According to Pope, she was raised in a conservative Christian family, and at age nine she moved from Cleveland to Pittsburgh, Pennsylvania, so that her father could start a church and become a lay pastor. After graduating in 2001, she became an attorney for the United States Department of Justice (DOJ). Pope was part of the National Security Council for four years also. In 2009 she was a U.S. Department of Justice Legislative Detailee, serving for just one year to Harry Reid, a former United States Senator. Pope was Deputy Homeland Security Advisor under the Obama administration from 2015 to 2017. She was a Senior Nonresident Fellow in the Atlantic Council from January 2017 until March 2021, when she became senior advisor for the United States president Joe Biden.

Pope served as a senior advisor for the Biden administration, although she later quit in July 2021. She took office and became the director general of the International Organization for Migration on October 1, 2023, after winning the election due to her opponent, António Vitorino, withdrawing from the race. Pope got the popular vote, getting 98 votes, while Vitorino got 67; overall, there were around 165 votes. During her candidacy she had the backing of many government officials, such as Assistant Secretary Michele J. Sison, Secretary Antony Blinken, and former U.S. president Joe Biden. As of 2026, Pope lives in Geneva, Switzerland, and is married to her husband with two daughters. Before taking the role as Director General, she was already working at IOM since September 2021.

== Early life and education ==
Amy Eileen Pope was born into a poor conservative Christian family in March 1974 in Cleveland, Ohio, and at age nine, Pope's family moved from Cleveland to Pittsburgh, Pennsylvania, into a Jewish community so her father could start a church as a lay pastor. Pope said in an interview that her family migrated from Sweden to the United States in the 1890s as farmers looking for better jobs and that her grandmother's mother was Indian while her father was British. She attended Duke University School of Law, studying civil rights law at Duke University School of Law, where she earned her Juris Doctor.

She also went to Haverford College in the early 2000s in Pennsylvania, where she got her Bachelor of Arts in political science and became a political science major. She also gained from the D.O.J. honors paralegal program, which was recommended to her by Indya Kincannon; she was a student at it for two years. During her time in university in the mid-90s, Pope wrote papers on if the European Union could create common migration policies. Her work with the Mexican border security later led to the White House in Washington, D.C. In her junior year she went to Paris to study, joining an exchange program with Sciences Po.

== Career ==
=== 2001–2021: College, attorney, clerkship, Senator to Harry Reid, Atlantic Council, Obama administration, Biden administration ===
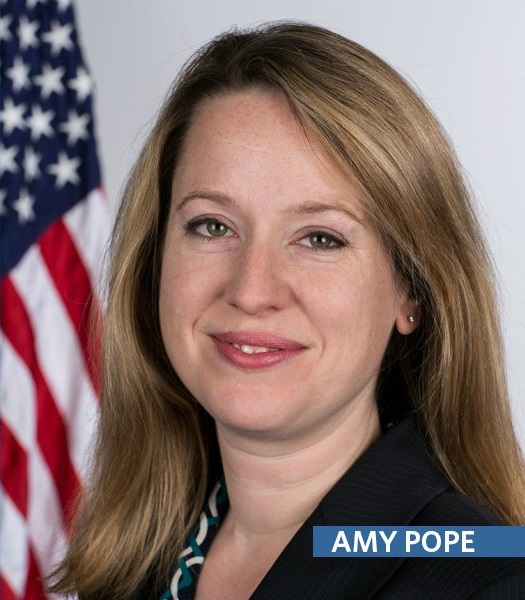
Pope's Deputy Homeland Security Advisor portrait

After graduating magna cum laude from Duke University School of Law in 2001, Pope became a prosecuting attorney for the United States Department of Justice in the Civil Rights Division, dealing with police misconduct, police brutality, and human trafficking; she was also a partner of Schillings, a British law firm based in London. Before becoming a government official, she earned a federal appellate clerkship for Kim McLane Wardlaw on the United States Court of Appeals for the Ninth Circuit.

Pope served as the Deputy Chief of Staff and Counselor to the Assistant Attorney General of the Criminal Division, Lanny A. Breuer, from 2010 to 2012. Pope also served as Senate staff twice, first as Counsel to the Senate Judiciary Committee and second as U.S. Department of Justice Legislative Detailee to Senator Harry Reid's office while he was Senate Democratic Majority Leader from 2009 to 2010.

Pope worked at the National Security Council for four years; she was Deputy Homeland Security Advisor and deputy assistant to the president under the Obama administration from 2015 till 2017, coordinating responses to crises such as the Ebola and Zika virus outbreaks and also working on homeland security issues, such as terrorism and cyberattacks. In July 2016, Pope, Chief of Staff Denis McDonough, and former president Barack Obama met in the White House to talk with him on the non-travel Zika virus-related announcements by the Florida Department of Health. On September 29, 2016, Pope announced that the United States and Canada were working together to "keep the borders safe." On November 7, 2016, Pope announced that the United States and Mexico partnered to also secure borders.

Pope served as a Senior Nonresident Fellow of the Atlantic Council from January 2017 to March 2021. In July 2018, Pope started working with Chatham House as an Associate Fellow, US and the Americas Program, although she left the role in March 2021. During Joe Biden's presidency, Pope served as senior advisor, managing migration, refugees, human trafficking, and climate-related crises, and in June 2021, Pope announced at the Solidarity Event for Forcibly Displaced Persons and Host Communities in Central America and Mexico that $57 million was given in humanitarian assistance. Pope left her role at the White House in July 2021.

Before Pope ran for Director General of IOM, she was the Deputy Director General for Management and Reform. During her time as Deputy Director, she oversaw reforms across 400 field locations and 17,000 staff and led reform efforts, causing a $75 million commitment from governments that optimized field delivery, managed risk, improved accountability, and strengthened coordination with the United Nations system.

=== 2023–present: Director General of the International Organization for Migration ===
In March 2023, Pope along with Michele J. Sison visited Madagascar to learn about the issues the country is facing with migration. Both met with Minister of Foreign Affairs Yvette Sylla and Minister of the Interior Justin Tokely to discuss how IOM could assist with the migration issues.

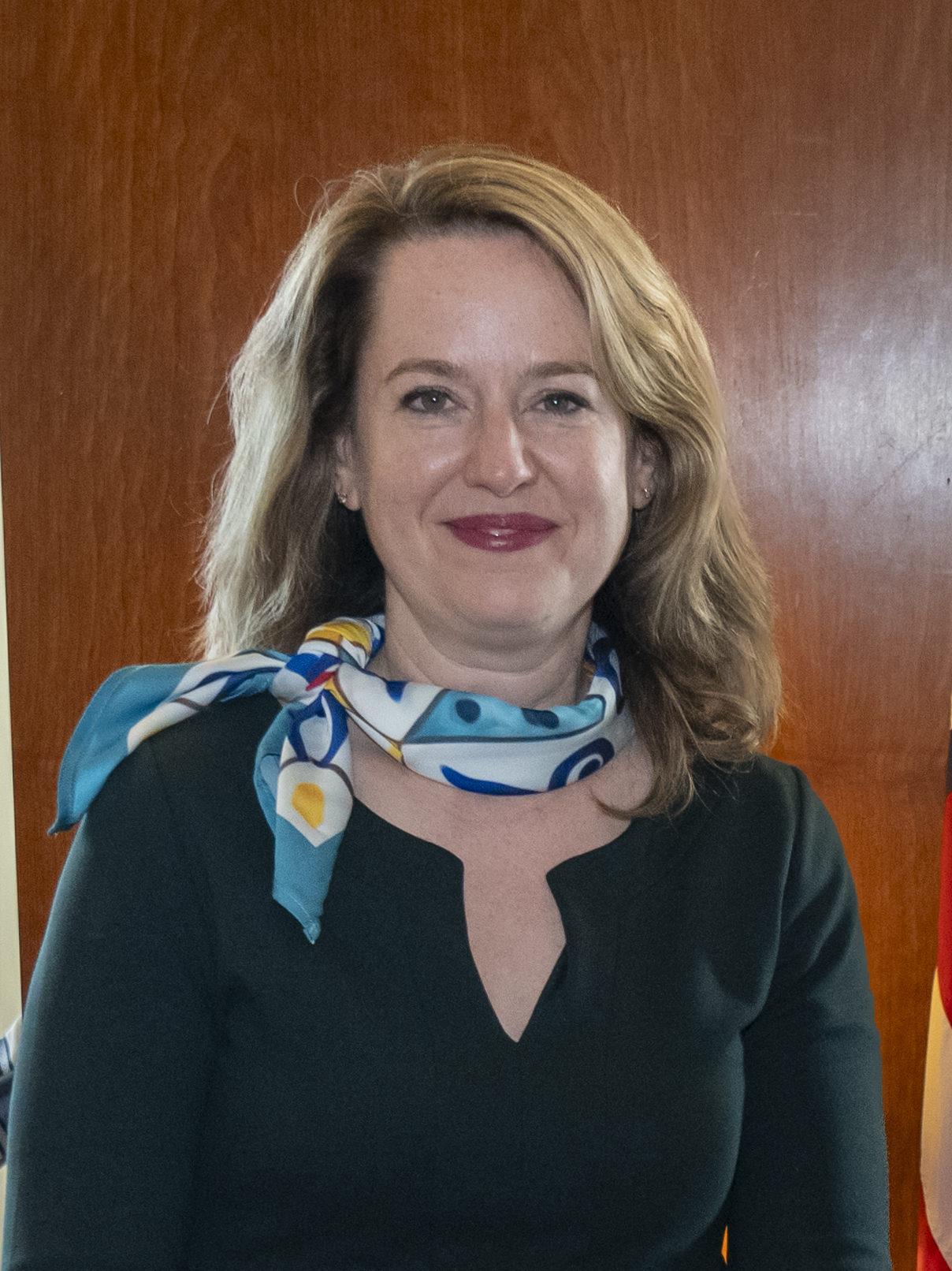
A cropped photo of Pope meeting Richard R. Verma in 2023

On May 15, 2023, the International Organization for Migration Member States elected Pope as their next Director General during its 6th Special Session of the IOM Council. Pope also became the first woman in history to be elected to it. Pope began running in October 2022 and was running against António Vitorino, who gained 98 votes, while Vitorino got 67 votes. Although Pope fell 12 votes behind in round one, Vitorino later withdrew from the election. In June 2023, Pope was in talks with companies such as Microsoft to ask for assistance in building a partnership for dealing with migration.

In October 2022, Secretary Antony Blinken announced in a statement that the United States nominated Pope for the role as Director General of the International Organization for Migration, at the time she was serving as Deputy Director General for Management and Reform. Former president Joe Biden gave a statement on Pope's candidacy in May 2023, with him stating that "Amy Pope is an innovative, strategic leader, and I strongly support her candidacy". Assistant Secretary Michele J. Sison also announced that she was supporting Pope in her candidacy.

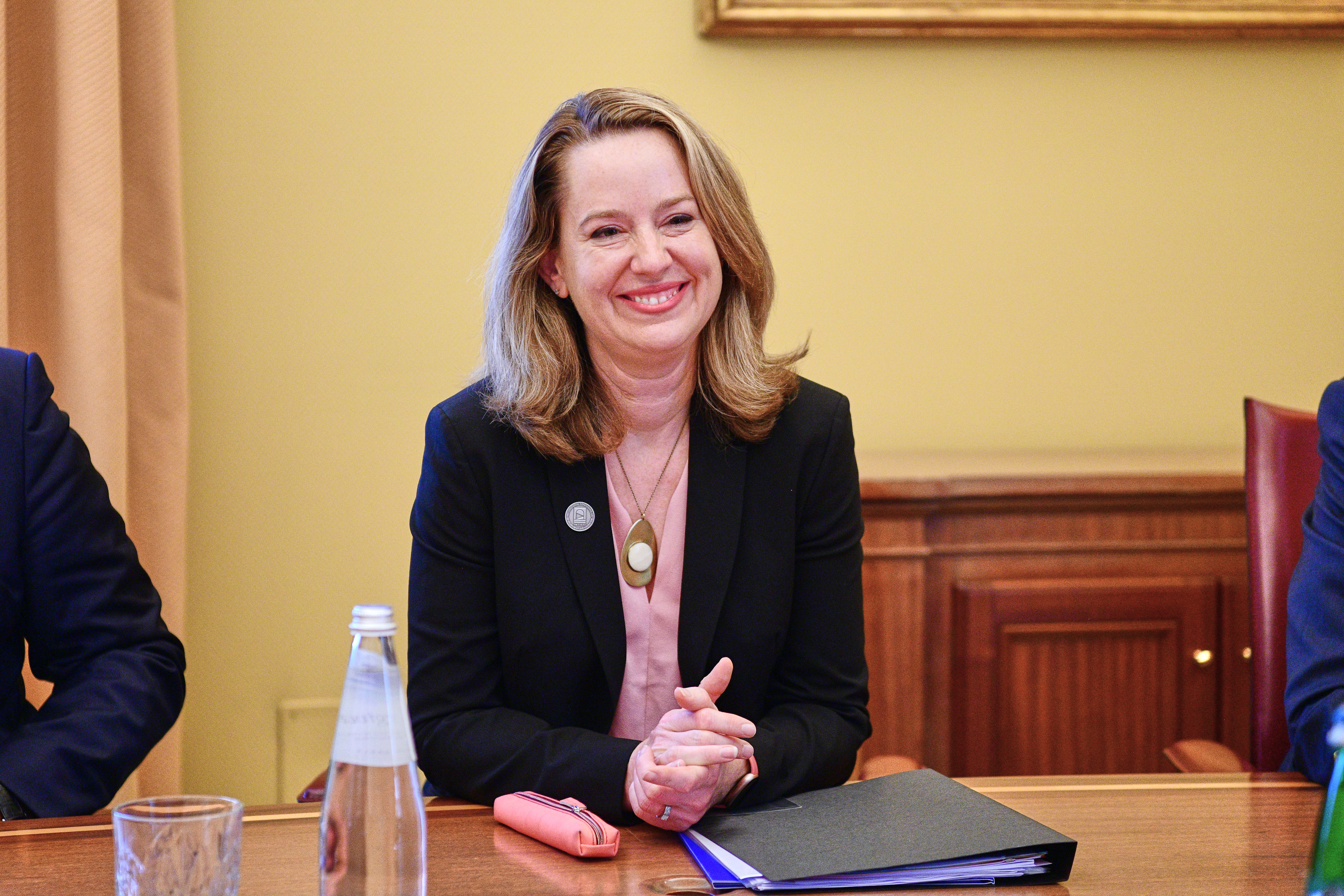
Pope in July 2023

She took office on October 1, 2023, and is the 11th director general, making a new strategic path for addressing increasing migration levels in the United States. According to her, the path is meant to allow the IOM to stop problems before they become crises. She also began implementing as director general for management and reform, leading changes that focus on the IOM's structure and resources, stating that "Migrants are people first, not problems", and saying that she wanted to "change the narrative on migration from a crisis to an economic solution," During the US-Africa Leaders Summit, Pope said to The Africa Report that she planned to prioritize Africa in aiding them with migration advice and supplies.

When she took the role as Director General, she automatically assumed the role of coordinator of the United Nations Network on Migration, working with the United Nations system to bring it further into accomplishing its goals in the Global Compact for Migration, including the Migration Multi-Partner Trust Fund.

In January 2024, Pope met with Pope Francis in the Apostolic Palace, in which Francis offered to be a voice for migration and support it. On March 9, 2024, Pope met with Secretary Antony Blinken in Washington, D.C., to discuss supporting safe migration through the Safe Mobility Office in the Western Hemisphere. They also talked about the Israel-Hamas war and the IOM's operation in Gaza, recognizing that "Palestinian civilians need assistance."

In July 2024, Pope offered assistance to Greece in further protecting migrants, in which Pope stated that, "This agreement ensures that IOM can continue to provide critical services". She also visited a reception facility for asylum seekers in Schisto, speaking with some of the migrants out of the 700 on their futures and aspirations. On July 11, 2024, it was announced by Pope that the IOM took in hundreds of millions of dollars towards funding its foundation, in which Pope stated that “over a third of the appeal has been funded so far.” In March she revealed a budget drop of almost 30%, telling countries to "expect even bigger program cuts in 2026." This happened after the U.S. funding programs ended; it was also caused by Donald Trump's foreign aid cuts.

In August 2024, Pope visited Ethiopia during her inaugural trip, arriving in Addis Ababa, and while there, she spoke to people and addressed the migration to the Gulf States; she also met with the African Union Commission chair. In January 2026, Pope signed an agreement with Algeria on voluntary returns; Pope described Algeria as a "key partner in regional migration governance." In March 2026, Pope visited Madrid and met with Spanish officials to discuss migration governance, labor mobility, and international cooperation.

On May 5, 2026, Pope spoke at the International Migration Review Forum 2026 at the Headquarters of the United Nations in New York City, where she spoke about the performance of IOM and what lies ahead for it. In July 2025, when the United Kingdom and France were getting ready to announce block crossing, Pope publicly warned both countries, stating that "It's too late to stop people from crossing the channel" and that, "More orderly migration would ease crisis". In September 2025, Pope called for stronger cooperation with migrants at the United Nations General Assembly.

On May 28, 2026, Pope and the Government of the Netherlands held a meeting to re-establish its commitment by announcing an aid of 16 million euro for a period of four years to support and ensure the safety of migrants. In July 2026, Pope visited Guyana to discuss how to strengthen IOM's support of the Member State in dealing with migration, meeting with five ministers of government. Pope also spoke with migrants and IOM staff in relation to migration. On July 1, 2026, Pope met with Geneva government officials in relation to how Geneva could build its roadmap for the future of humanitarian aid and recovery programs in government areas.

== 2023 election statistics ==
Candidates	Country	Votes	Result	All votes	Ref
Amy E. Pope	United States	98	Elected by acclamation	165	
António Vitorino	Portugal	67	Withdrew	165	

== Personal life ==
As of 2026, Pope lives in Geneva, Switzerland, and is married with two daughters.
