= Peter Ludlow (disambiguation) =

Peter Ludlow is a professor of philosophy at Northwestern University.

Peter Ludlow may also refer to:

- Peter Ludlow, 1st Earl Ludlow (1730–1803), British politician
- Peter Ludlow (historian), historian and author
- Peter Ludlow, a character from the Jurassic Park franchise
