= Office of International Organization for Migration Director General's Special Envoy for the Regional Response to the Venezuela Situation =

Refugee aid organization

The Office of International Organization for Migration (IOM) Director General's Special Envoy for the Regional Response to the Venezuela Situation (OSE) is based in Panama City, Panama, and leads the coordination and operational oversight for 17 countries in Latin America and the Caribbean operating under the framework of the Regional Refugee and Migrant Response Plan (RMRP), while serving as co-lead with UNHCR of the Inter-Agency Coordination Platform for Refugees and Migrants (R4V).

The office provides support to national platforms and assists country offices in terms of information management, communications, and resource mobilization related to the response to Venezuela. OSE is also responsible for political liaison and co-leads the Technical Secretariat of the Quito Process, together with UNHCR.

== Geographic coverage ==
The geographic coverage of the OSE includes the following 17 countries:

- Argentina
- Aruba
- Bolivia
- Brazil
- Chile
- Colombia
- Costa Rica
- Curaçao
- Ecuador
- Guyana
- Mexico
- Panama
- Paraguay
- Uruguay
- Dominican Republic
- Trinidad and Tobago
- Uruguay
