= International Organization for Migration =

Intergovernmental organization

- Formation: 6 December 1951; 74 years ago
- Type: UN Related Organization
- Headquarters: Geneva, Switzerland
- Members: 174 member states and 8 observer states (2026)
- Official languages: English, French and Spanish
- Director General: Amy Pope
- Budget: US$3.7 billion (2024)
- Staff: 22,351 (2024)
- Website: www.iom.int

The International Organization for Migration (IOM) is a United Nations related organization working in the field of migration. The organization implements operational assistance programmes for migrants, including internally displaced persons, refugees, and migrant workers.

The International Organization for Migration is a UN agency based in Geneva. Its director general is Amy Pope.

== History ==
=== Historical context and predecessor organizations (1951 to 1989) ===
The International Organization for Migration (IOM) was founded in 1951 in response to the large number of internally displaced persons and war refugees in Europe after the Second World War. IOM was initially a logistics agency that organized the transport of nearly one million migrants in the 1950s and has undergone several name changes since its inception. The transition from the Provisional Intergovernmental Committee for the Movement of Migrants from Europe (PICMME) in 1951 to the Intergovernmental Committee for European Migration (ICEM) in 1952, to the Intergovernmental Committee for Migration (ICM) in 1980, and finally to the International Organization for Migration (IOM) in 1989 reflects the evolution of the IOM's mandate over its existence, becoming the leading intergovernmental organization in the field of migration.

Recent scholarship has emphasized that ICEM's early operations also intersected with, and disrupted, existing commercial migration networks. Prior to the 1950s, migration from Europe had largely been facilitated by private travel agencies and transport intermediaries that provided documentation assistance, medical arrangements, and passage booking. Historians have argued that ICEM's subsidised transport programmes and direct processing of migrants challenged these private actors, producing tensions over authority, pricing, and control within what has been described as a post-war migration industry. Over time, this competition gave way to more hybrid arrangements, as ICEM relied on commercial carriers and agencies adapted to new institutional frameworks.

=== Integration into the United Nations and the present (1990 to date) ===
In 1992, it was granted observer status at the United Nations General Assembly (GA resolution A/RES/47/4). In September 2016, the United Nations (UN) Member States, through the General Assembly, unanimously adopted a resolution approving the agreement to transform IOM into an affiliated organization of the UN. This agreement has strengthened the relationship between IOM and the UN and improved its ability to fulfill its respective mandates in the interests of migrants and Member States.

IOM supported the creation of the Global Compact for Migration, the first-ever intergovernmental agreement on international migration which was adopted in Marrakesh, Morocco, in December 2018. To support the implementation, follow-up and review of the Global Compact on Migration, the UN secretary-general António Guterres established the UN Network on Migration in 2019. IOM coordinates the United Nations Network on Migration which includes UNHCR, WFP and UNDP, among others. While IOM's history tracks the man-made and natural disasters of the past half century, including Kosovo and Timor 1999, and the Asian tsunami, the 2003 invasion of Iraq, the Pakistan earthquake of 2004/2005, the 2010 Haiti earthquake, and the European migrant crisis—its credo that humane and orderly migration benefits migrants and society has steadily gained more international acceptance.

== Structure ==
=== Organization ===
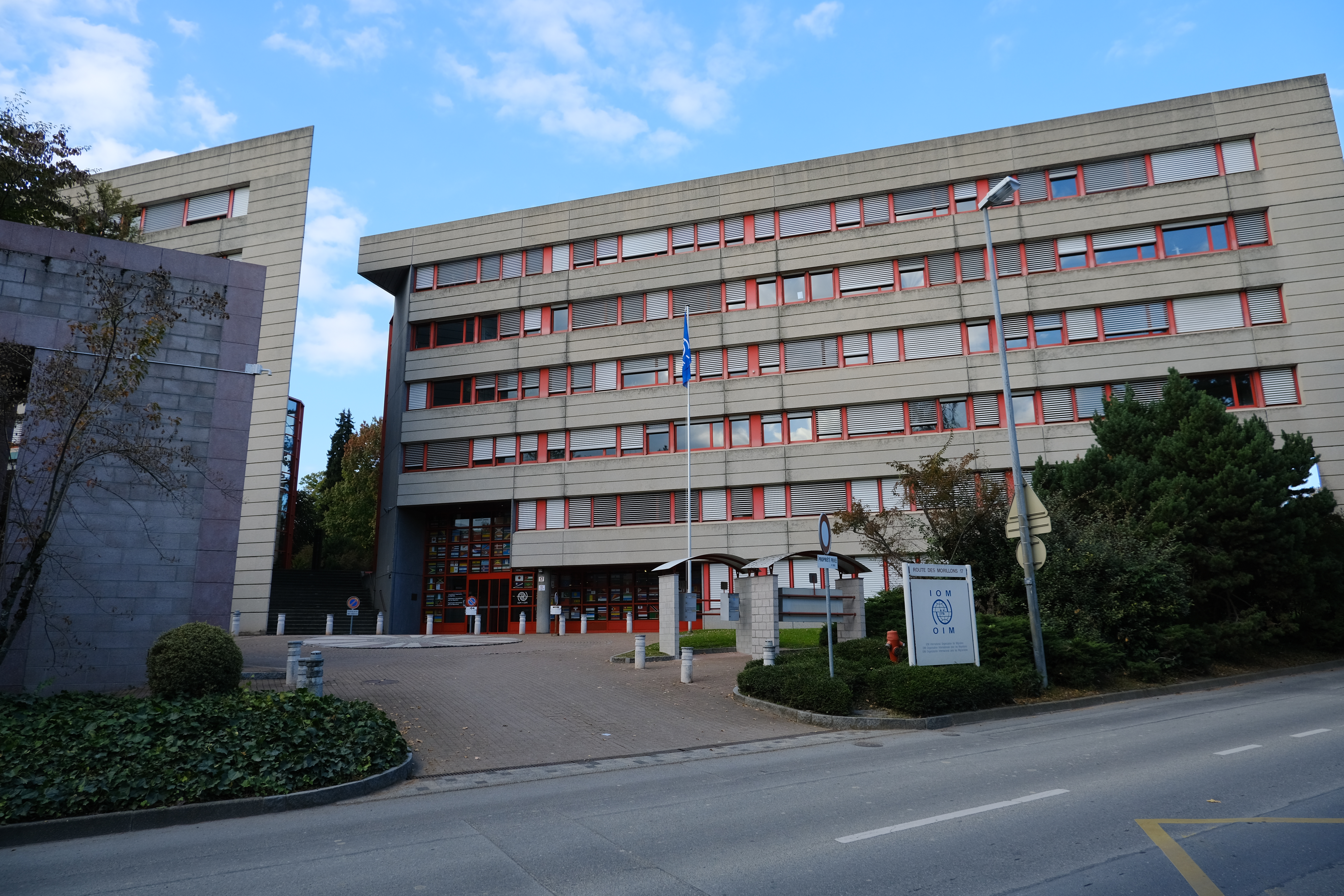
International Organization for Migration headquarters in Geneva

The organization is headquartered in Geneva, with liaison offices in New York City and Addis Ababa. The Global Migration Data Analysis Centre (GMDAC) is based in Berlin. In 2024, the organization reported that it had 22,351 employees, with 175 nationalities represented. The highest decision-making body of the IOM is the council, in which all member states are represented. It has rules of procedure and meets at regular intervals to adopt the annual budget and determine the organization's programmatic objectives. The official languages are English, French and Spanish. According to its own figures, the organization's budget in 2024 was around 3.7 billion US dollars. This is made up of voluntary contributions from the member states and donations.

=== Director General ===
The Director General of the organization is elected by the delegates of the IOM member states for a five-year term. The following table lists the previous directors of the IOM and its predecessor organization, the ICEM. The current Director General is Amy Pope from the United States, with Ugochi Daniels from Nigeria and SungAh Lee from South Korea serving as Deputy Directors General.

No.	Portrait	Name	Term	Ref
1		Hugh S. Gibson	December 12, 1954 – June 10, 1952	
2		Harold H. Tittmann Jr.	April 27, 1955 – May 13, 1958	
3		Marcus Daly	May 14, 1958 – October 3, 1961	
4		Bastiaan W. Haveman	October 27, 1961 – February 8, 1969	
5		John F. Thomas	February 14, 1969 – February 28, 1979	
6		James L. Carlin	March 1, 1979 – September 30, 1988	
7		James N. Purcell Jr.	October 1, 1988 – September 30, 1998	
8		Brunson McKinley	October 1, 1998 – September 30, 2008	
9		William L. Swing	June 18, 2008 – September 30, 2018	
10		António Vitorino	October 1, 2018 – September 30, 2023	
11		Amy Pope	October 1, 2023 – Incumbent	

== Mandate ==
The organization's global mandate includes assistance to migrants, including migrant workers, refugees and internally displaced persons. This broad mandate of the organization has earned it praise for flexibility in crisis situations, but also criticism for legal accountability in protection issues. Due to complementary mandates, IOM often cooperates with the UNHCR.

For example, IOM coordinates work in response to the situation in Venezuela through the Office of International Organization for Migration Director General's Special Envoy for the Regional Response to the Venezuela Situation working with UNHCR and 17 countries in South and Central America and the Caribbean.

According to the United Nations Office for the Coordination of Humanitarian Affairs (OCHA), IOM is one of the central actors in humanitarian aid within the UN system, especially in the context of displacement. IOM's main aid measures include shelter, protection, the provision of basic medical and sanitary care, life safety, coordination, telecommunications and logistics. On the instructions of the UN Emergency Relief Coordinator, IOM, together with UNHCR, is primarily responsible for camp coordination and management in humanitarian emergencies. The organization is also active in stabilization, peacebuilding and development in the context of migration. In 2026, IOM announced its co-leadership, together with the International Federation of Red Cross and Red Crescent Societies (IFRC), of the Shelter, Land and Site Coordination Cluster, guiding coordination for humanitarian shelter, land and site management worldwide.

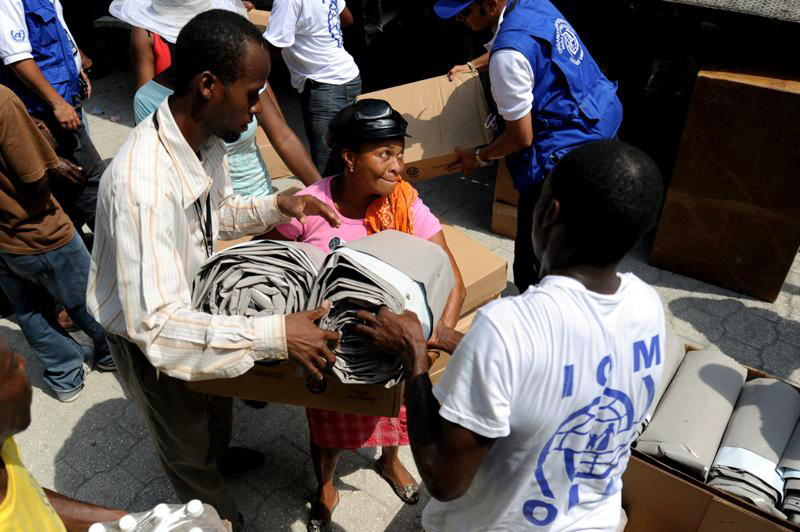
Internally displaced people receive humanitarian aid after an earthquake in Port-au-Prince, Haiti.

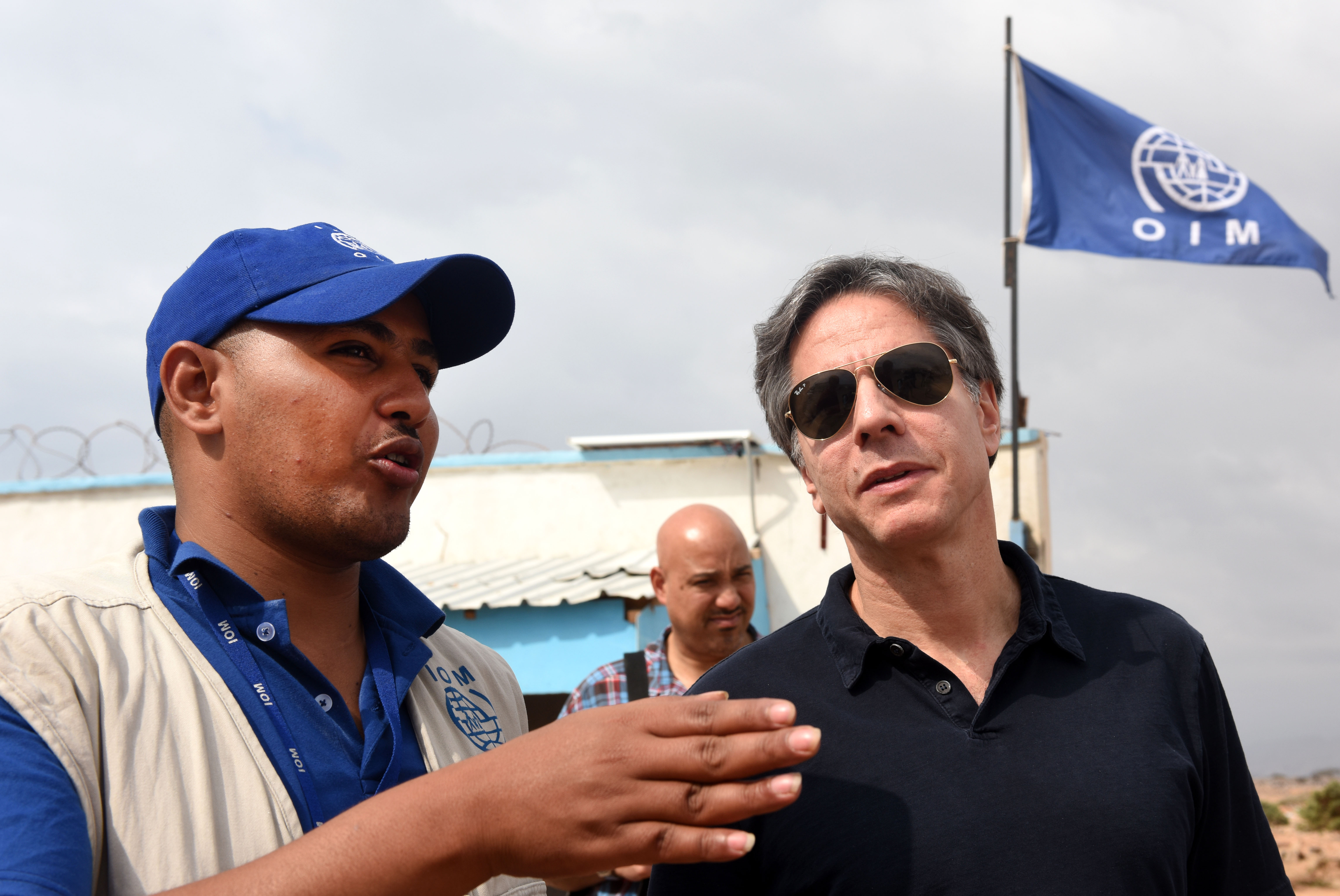
US Secretary of State Blinken during an IOM mission in Obock, Djibouti.

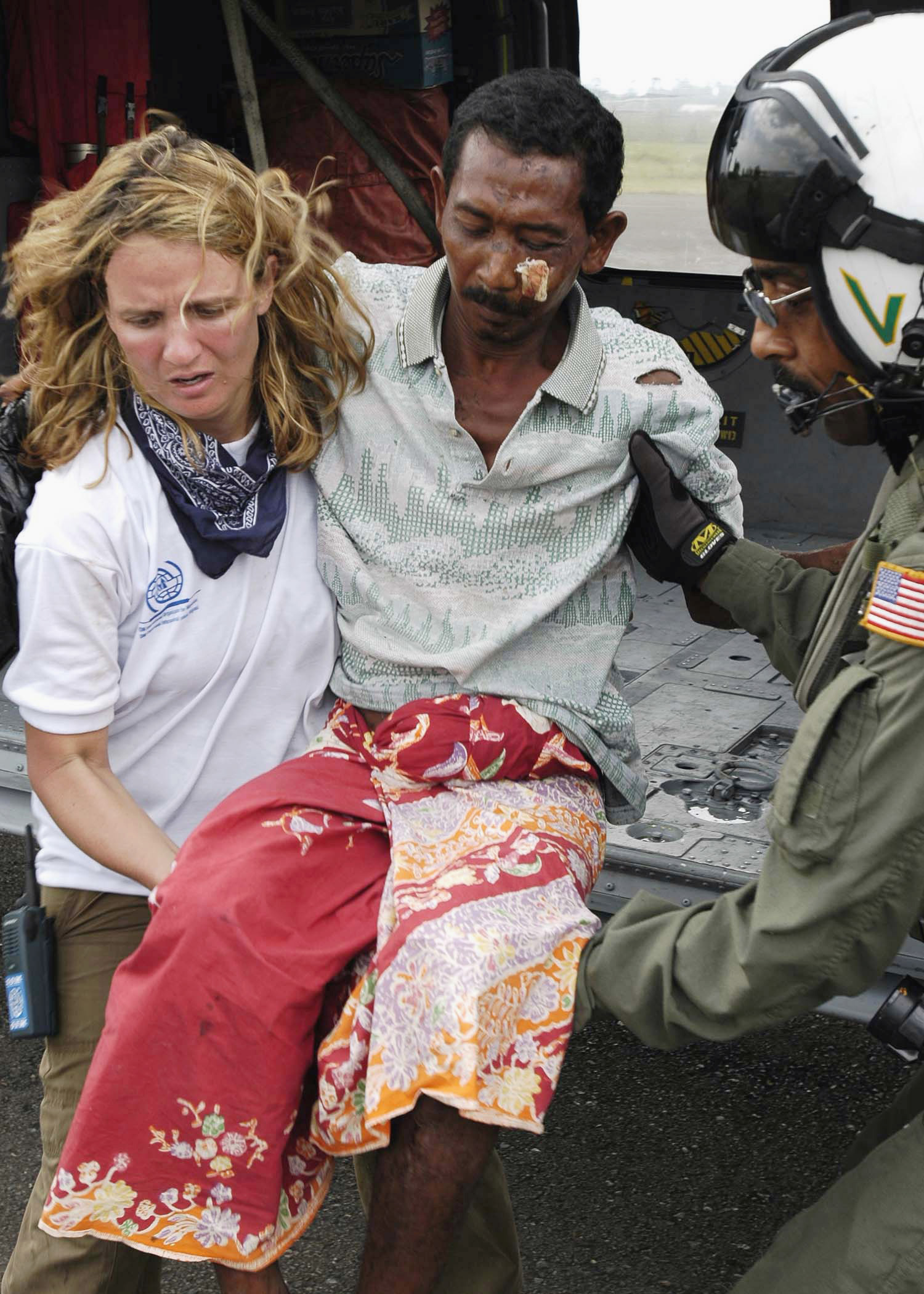
Evacuation after a tsunami in Banda Aceh, Sumatra, Indonesia.

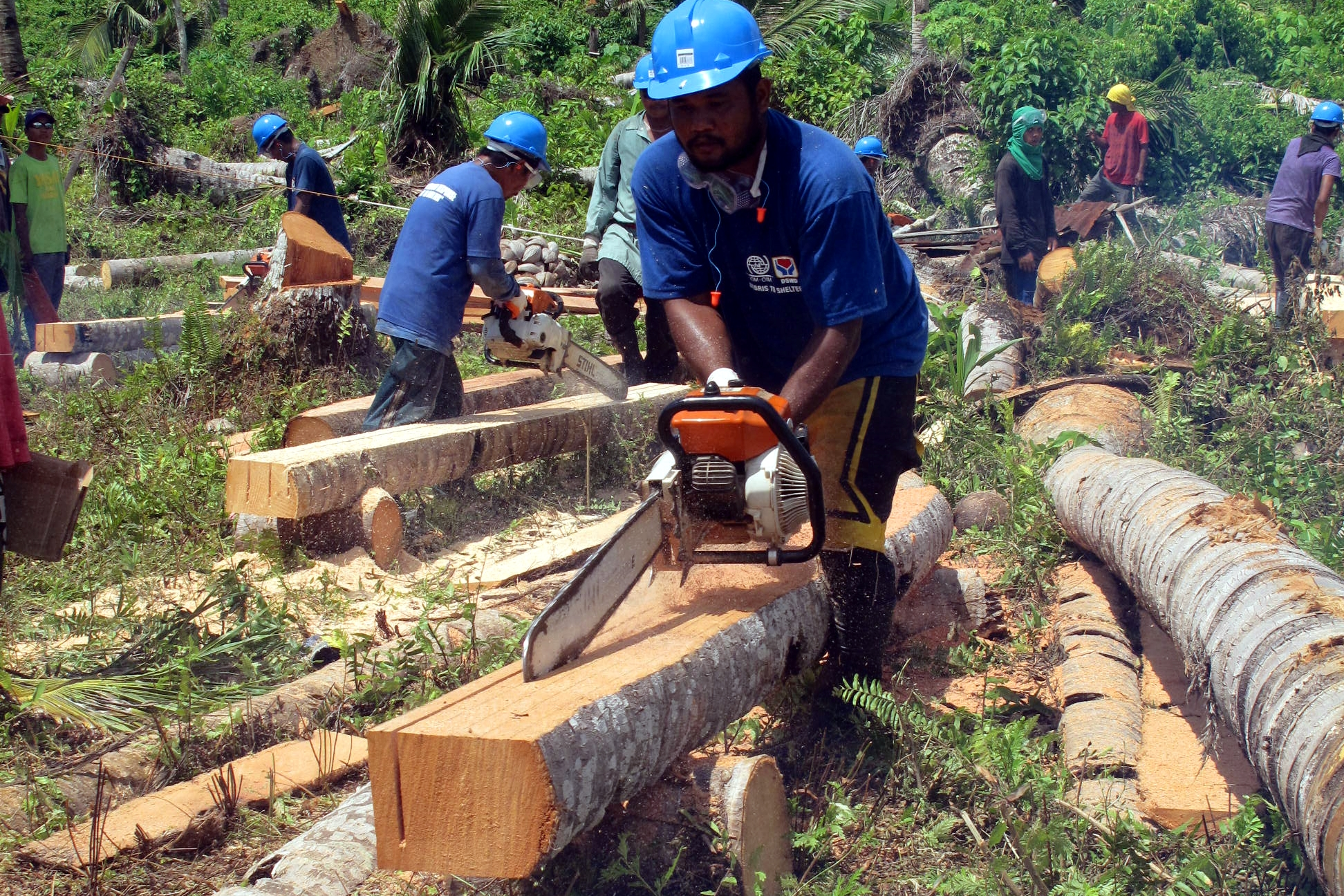
Trees uprooted by Typhoon Haiyan are used for reconstruction aid in the Philippines.

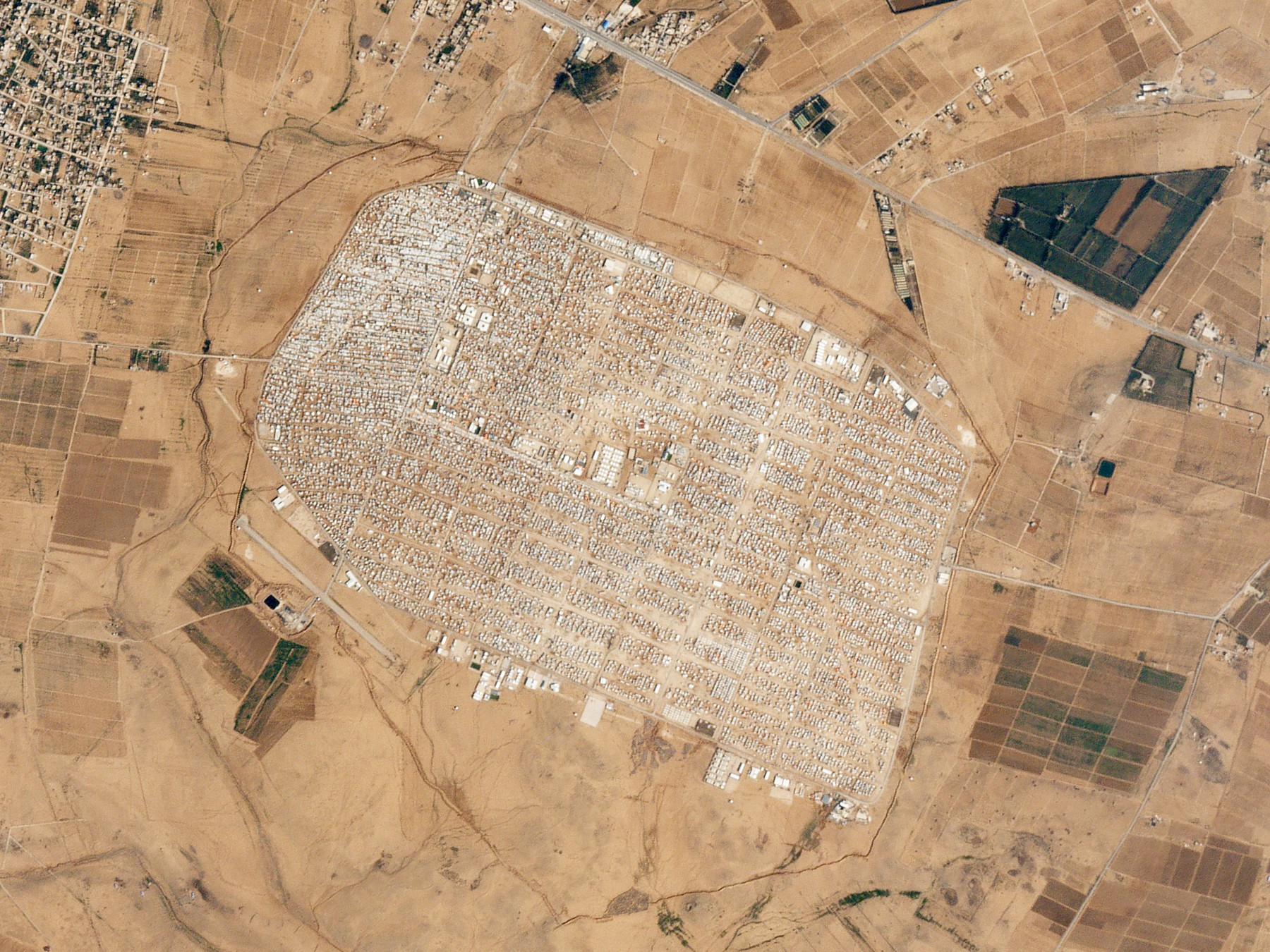
In Zaatari, Jordan, IOM supports the medical care and education of refugees.

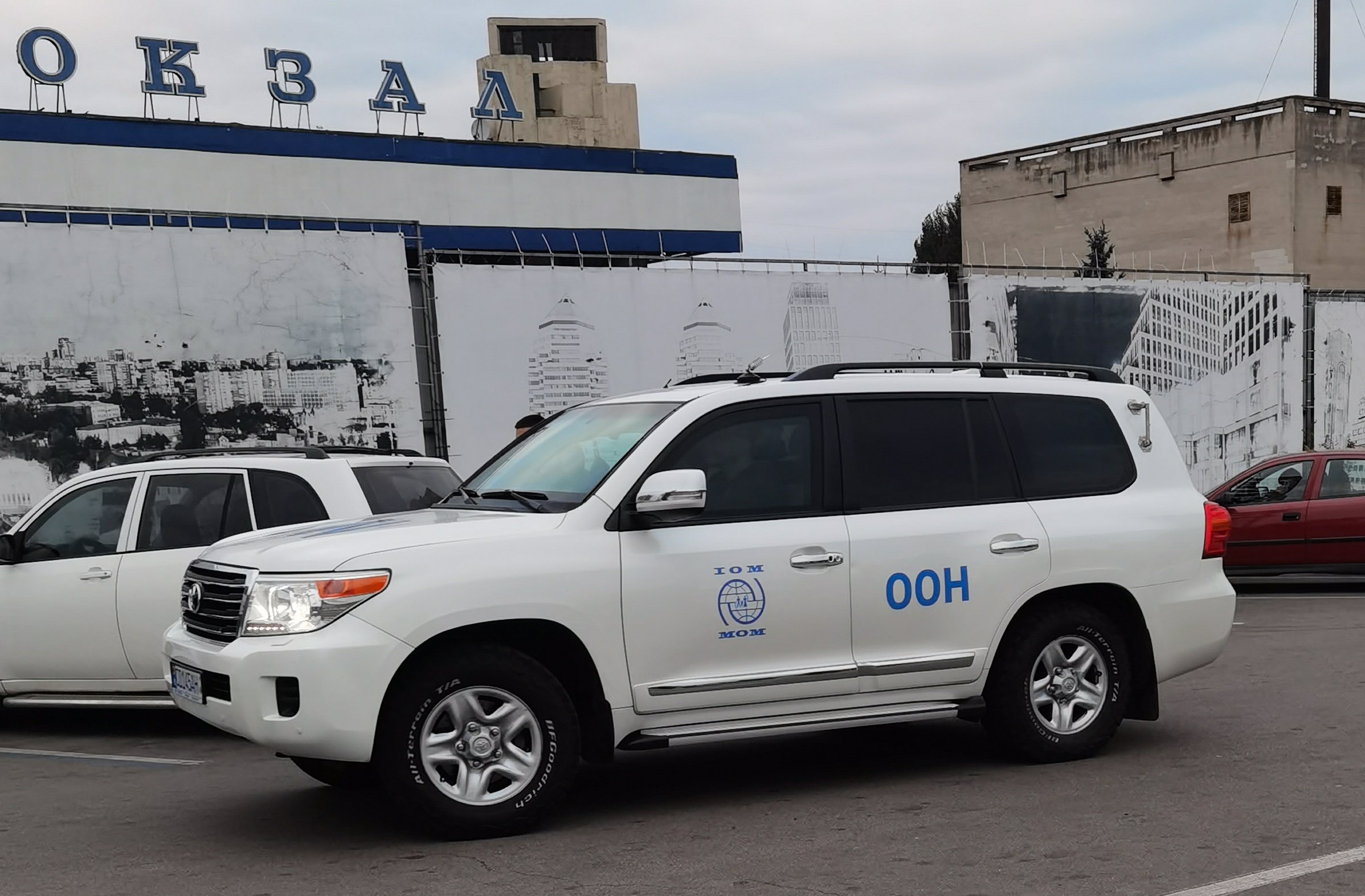
IOM Car in Dnipro, Ukraine

== Member states ==
Member states of the IOM: member observer non-members

As of 2026, the International Organization for Migration has 174 member states and 8 observer states.

- Afghanistan
- Albania
- Algeria
- Angola
- Antigua and Barbuda
- Argentina
- Armenia
- Australia
- Austria
- Azerbaijan
- Bahamas
- Bangladesh
- Barbados
- Belarus
- Belgium
- Belize
- Benin
- Bolivia
- Bosnia and Herzegovina
- Botswana
- Brazil
- Bulgaria
- Burkina Faso
- Burundi
- Cambodia
- Cameroon
- Canada
- Cape Verde
- Central African Republic
- Chad
- Chile
- China
- Colombia
- Comoros
- Congo
- Cook Islands
- Costa Rica
- Croatia
- Cuba
- Cyprus
- Czech Republic
- Democratic Republic of the Congo
- Denmark
- Djibouti
- Dominica
- Dominican Republic
- Ecuador
- Egypt
- El Salvador
- Eritrea
- Estonia
- Eswatini
- Ethiopia
- Fiji
- Finland
- France
- Gabon
- Gambia
- Georgia
- Germany
- Ghana
- Greece
- Grenada
- Guatemala
- Guinea
- Guinea-Bissau
- Guyana
- Haiti
- Holy See
- Honduras
- Hungary
- Iceland
- India
- Iran
- Ireland
- Israel
- Italy
- Ivory Coast
- Jamaica
- Japan
- Jordan
- Kazakhstan
- Kenya
- Kiribati
- Kyrgyzstan
- Laos
- Latvia
- Lesotho
- Liberia
- Libya
- Lithuania
- Luxembourg
- Madagascar
- Malawi
- Maldives
- Mali
- Malta
- Marshall Islands
- Mauritania
- Mauritius
- Mexico
- Micronesia
- Moldova
- Mongolia
- Montenegro
- Morocco
- Mozambique
- Myanmar
- Namibia
- Nauru
- Nepal
- Netherlands
- New Zealand
- Niger
- Nigeria
- North Macedonia
- Norway
- Pakistan
- Palau
- Panama
- Papua New Guinea
- Paraguay
- Peru
- Philippines
- Poland
- Portugal
- Romania
- Russia
- Rwanda
- Saint Kitts and Nevis
- Saint Lucia
- Saint Vincent and the Grenadines
- Samoa
- São Tomé and Príncipe
- Senegal
- Serbia
- Seychelles
- Sierra Leone
- Slovakia
- Slovenia
- Solomon Islands
- Somalia
- South Africa
- South Korea
- South Sudan
- Spain
- Sri Lanka
- Sudan
- Suriname
- Sweden
- Switzerland
- Tajikistan
- Tanzania
- Thailand
- Timor-Leste
- Togo
- Tonga
- Trinidad and Tobago
- Tunisia
- Turkey
- Turkmenistan
- Tuvalu
- Uganda
- Ukraine
- United Kingdom
- United States
- Uruguay
- Uzbekistan
- Vanuatu
- Venezuela
- Vietnam
- Yemen
- Zambia
- Zimbabwe

Observer states:

- Bahrain
- Bhutan
- Indonesia
- Kuwait
- Malaysia
- Qatar
- San Marino
- Saudi Arabia

Non-member states:

- Brunei
- Equatorial Guinea
- Hong Kong
- Iraq
- Lebanon
- Macau
- North Korea
- Oman
- Singapore
- Syria
- Taiwan
- United Arab Emirates

== Criticism ==
=== 2003 Amnesty and Human Rights Watch ===
In 2003, both Amnesty International and Human Rights Watch were critical of the IOM's role in the Australian government's "Pacific Solution" of transferring asylum seekers to offshore detention centres. Human Rights Watch criticized the IOM for operating Manus Regional Processing Centre and the processing centre on Nauru despite not having a refugee protection mandate. Human Rights Watch criticized the IOM for being part of "arbitrary detention" and for denying asylum seekers access to legal advice. Human Rights Watch urged the IOM to cease operation the process centres, which it stated were "detention centres" and to hand management of the centres to the United Nations High Commissioner for Refugees.

Amnesty International expressed concern that the IOM undertook actions on behalf of governments that negatively impacted the human rights of asylum seekers, refugees and migrants. Amnesty International cited an example of fourteen Kurds in Indonesia who were expelled from Australian waters by Australian authorities and relocated to Indonesia. Amnesty International requested an assurance that the IOM will abide by the principle of non-refoulement.

=== 2022 Refugee Council of Australia ===
In 2022, the role that the IOM played in housing refugees in Indonesia was described by the Refugee Council of Australia as presenting a "humanitarian veneer while carrying out rights-violating activities on behalf of Western nations” by researchers Asher Hirsch and Cameron Doig in The Globe and Mail.

The community housing that the IOM operated, using Australian government funding, was described by the Refugee Council of Australia "inhumane conditions, solitary confinement, lack of basic essentials and medical care, physical and sexual abuse, and severe overcrowding". Rohingya John Joniad described the housing as an "open prison".

=== Uyghur refugees ===
In 2024, the IOM was criticized for being unable or willing to intervene in refugee cases involving Uyghurs.

== See also ==
- Non-refoulement
- Global Compact for Migration
- Mohamed Muktar Jama Farah, a British-Somali long-distance runner and multiple Olympic gold medalist, IOM Goodwill Ambassador
- United Nations High Commissioner for Refugees (UNHCR)

== Bibliography ==
- Andrijasevic, Rutvica; Walters, William (2010): The International Organization for Migration and the international government of borders. In Environment and Planning D: Society and Space 28 (6), pp. 977–999.
- Georgi, Fabian; Schatral, Susanne (2017): Towards a Critical Theory of Migration Control. The Case of the International Organization for Migration (IOM). In Martin Geiger, Antoine Pécoud (Eds.): International organisations and the politics of migration: Routledge, pp. 193–221.
- Koch, Anne (2014): The Politics and Discourse of Migrant Return: The Role of UNHCR and IOM in the Governance of Return. In Journal of Ethnic and Migration Studies 40 (6), pp. 905–923. doi:10.1080/1369183X.2013.855073.
