= Centre for European Policy Studies =

Think tank based in Brussels, Belgium

- Abbreviation: CEPS
- Formation: 1983; 43 years ago
- Location: Place du Congrès 1, Brussels, Belgium
- Region served: European Union
- Chief Executive Officer: Karel Lannoo
- Website: www.ceps.eu

The Centre for European Policy Studies (CEPS) is a think tank based in Brussels, Belgium. It was established in 1983. Its primary tasks are to conduct rigorous, evidence-based policy research on European and global issues, to serve as a leading forum for debate among stakeholders, and to disseminate its findings through regular publications and public events.

== Organisation ==
CEPS's first director was Peter Ludlow. Its director between 2000 and 2020 was Daniel Gros, who had formerly been an economic advisor at the European Commission. Its chief executive officer since 2000 has been Karel Lannoo. Currently Andrea Renda is the director of research at CEPS, leading the GRID unit on global governance, regulation, innovation, and the digital economy while also holding influential academic, advisory, and research roles internationally in digital policy, artificial intelligence, and emerging technologies.

== Funding ==
In 2023, more than 40% of CEPS's net revenue came from grants from and services provided to European Union institutions. 17.3% came from corporate and institutional membership fees.

In 2015, 23% of CEPS's budget came from collaborative European research projects, in which academics Diane Stone and Stella Ladi note it often played the role of communicating the project results.

Writing in 2000, Philippa Sherrington noted that CEPS's corporate membership was then its largest source of income, with "its promotional literature [stressing] the importance of this constituency".

== Rankings ==
Ramona Coman notes that together with Bruegel, CEPS is one of only two Brussels-based organisations to occupy leading positions in international rankings of think tanks.
