= Ugochi Daniels =

IOM Deputy Director General of Operations

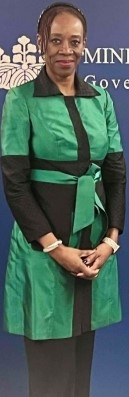
Ugochi Daniels in 2025

Ugochi (Ugo) Daniels is the International Organization for Migration's (IOM) Deputy Director General of Operations, taking office on September 1, 2021.

Before joining the organization, she worked as the Chief of Staff at the United Nations Relief and Works Agency for Palestine Refugees (UNRWA), covering Jordan, Lebanon, Syria, and the West Bank and Gaza.

== Careers in United Nations and United States Government Agencies ==
Prior to joining United Nations Population Fund (UNFPA), Daniels worked with USAID's Nigeria Office between 1999 and 2002, serving both in the Office of Transition Initiatives and later as a Monitoring, Evaluation and Information Specialist.

Daniels began her career in the United Nations in 2002 as the Deputy Program Manager for the Africa Youth Alliance, covering Ghana, Tanzania, Botswana, and Uganda [2002 - 2007]. She continued her work as the Deputy Representative in Nepal from 2007 to 2010.

She then served as a Country Representative in the Philippines from 2010 to 2013. Daniels assumed the role of Chief of the Humanitarian and Fragile Contexts Branch in the Programme Division of UNFPA, headquarters, from 2013 to 2018, responding to emergencies.

She continued her work in a new role in the Islamic Republic of Iran from 2018 to 2020 as the United Nations Resident Coordinator and Designated Official for Security.

From 2020 to 2021, Ugochi Daniels worked as the Chief of Staff at the United Nations Relief and Works Agency for Palestine Refugees (UNRWA), covering Jordan, Lebanon, Syria, and the West Bank and Gaza.

Since 2021, Ugochi Daniels has been working as the IOM's Deputy Director General of Operations.

== Career timeline ==
- 2021 – present: Deputy Director General of Operations at the International Organization for Migration (IOM).
- 2020 – 2021: Chief of Staff at the UN Agency for Palestine Refugees (UNRWA).
- 2018 – 2020: UN Resident Coordinator and Designated Official for Security in the Islamic Republic of Iran.
- 2013 – 2018: Chief, Humanitarian and Fragile Contexts Branch, UNFPA Headquarters, New York.
- 2010 – 2013: UNFPA Country Representative, Philippines.
- 2007 – 2010: UNFPA Deputy Representative, Nepal.
- 2002 – 2007: Programme Specialist, Africa Division, UNFPA Headquarters, New York.
- 1999 – 2001: USAID Monitoring and Evaluation Information Specialist, Nigeria.
- 1996 – 1999: MIS Manager, Investment and Portfolio Management Services Ltd., Lagos, Nigeria.
- 1992 – 1996: Systems Analyst, Cedar Group of Companies, Lagos, Nigeria.
- 1987 – 1990: Evaluation Officer, Sigma Systems, Lagos, Nigeria.
- 1984 – 1986: Lecturer II, Nigerian Defence Academy, Kaduna, Nigeria.

== See also ==
- United Nations Population Fund
- Reproductive Health Supplies Coalition
- Sandbæk Report
- International Organization for Migration
