= International Migration Initiative =

Initiative of the Open Society Foundation

The International Migration Initiative is an effort by the Open Society Foundations to promote harmony, equality and raise the quality of life, of immigrants all around the world. The Foundation realises the impact of migration on the global map. The International Migration Initiative strives to find solutions for issues such as inequality, discrimination and exclusion that are faced by migrants in the immigration procedure as well as in the immigrant destination.

The initiative tries to address these issues through two main goals; promoting accountability and transparency in the immigration procedure, working towards establishing justice and equality among the migrants. It also tries to reach its vision by providing grants through various strategies, widening legal advocacy, working for strengthening of the civil voice and providing support in matters of communication, education and research.

The International Migration Initiative seeks to establish a web of programmes in partnership with other organisations that work towards creating a large and positive impact in the quality of life of migrants all over the world.

== Personnel ==
The Greek migration expert Demetrios Papademetriou was chairman of the MPI and also headed its bureau in Brussels, named ″MPI Europe″.
