= Peter Ludlow (historian) =

Author on European issues

Peter Ludlow is a historian and author who has published several books. He writes extensively on European issues and is the historian of the European Council, with privileged access to oral and documentary sources. The European Council is the body which brings together the heads of state and government of the European Union. He electronically publishes pre-summit briefings and post-summit evaluations of every meeting of the European Council. These are available from EuroComment.

== Academic career ==
Between 1966 and 1976, Ludlow taught international history at the University of London. He then spent 5 years as a professor at the European University Institute in Florence. In 1981 he came to Brussels to set up a new policy research institute, and he was the Founding Director of the Centre for European Policy Studies (CEPS) until he stepped down in 2001.

Ludlow is the chairman and part owner of EuroComment SA, an electronic publishing house. Ludlow, Antonio Vitorino and Vladimir Drobnjak are joint chairmen of the European Strategy Forum.
