= Peter Adolph Gad =

Danish ophthalmologist

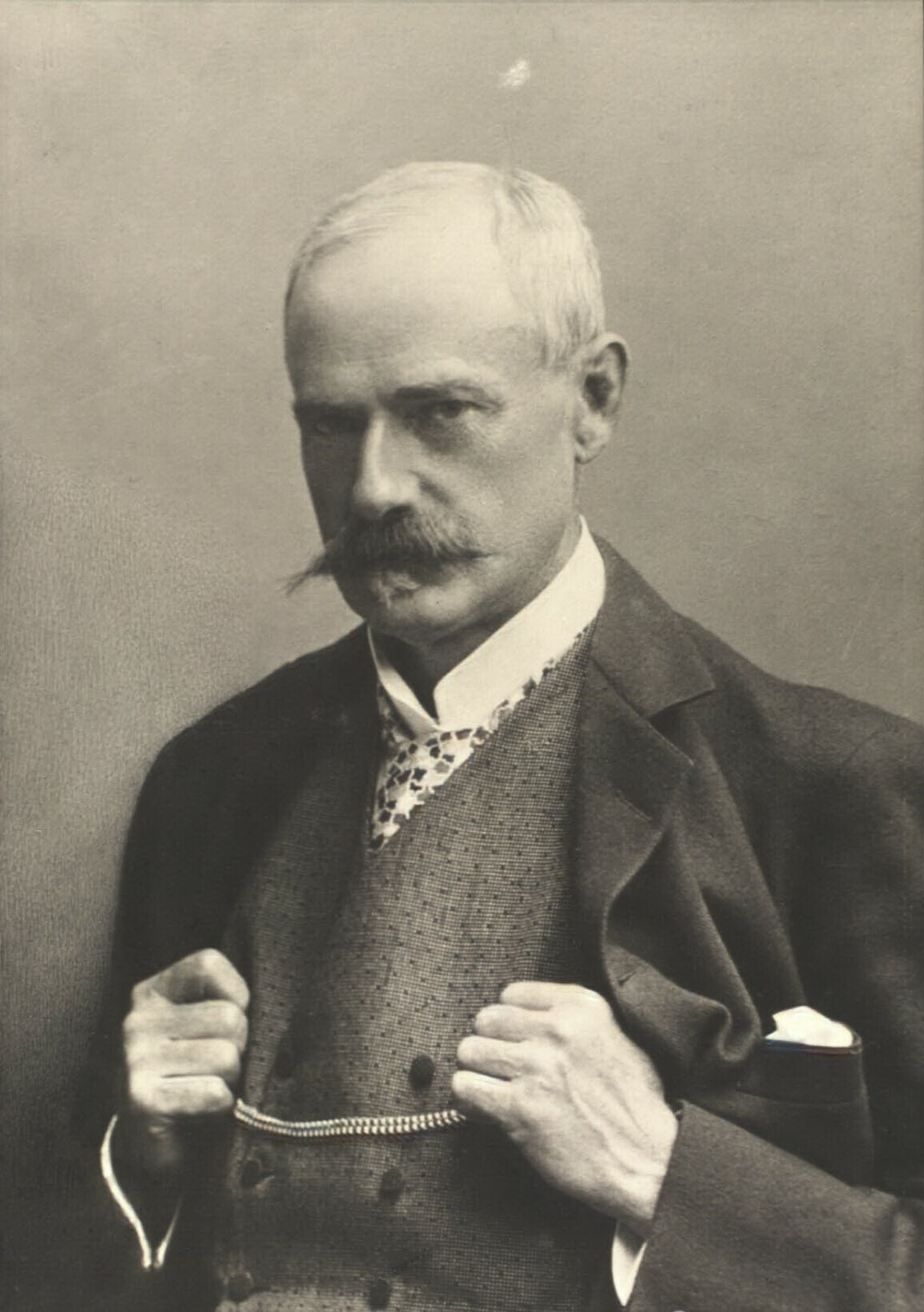
Image of Adolph Gad

Peter Adolph Rostgaard Bruun Gad (25 November 1846 – 26 February 1907) was a Danish-Brazilian ophthalmologist who founded the first eye infirmary of São Paulo city, Brazil, at the "Santa Casa de Sao Paulo" hospital, in 1885. This eye infirmary became the first ophthalmology school of São Paulo. Gad also worked in Rio de Janeiro and Copenhagen.
