= Peter Thielst =

Danish philosopher (born 1951)

Peter Thielst (born 1951) is a Danish philosopher, author and publisher of philosophical books from the Danish bureau "Det lille forlag" ("The little publisher"). He has written biographical works on Kierkegaard and Nietzsche.

== Bibliography ==
- (1977) Driftens fortolkninger
- (1978) Den kønspolitiske tænkning
- (1980) Søren og Regine
- (1984) Psykoanalyse og psykoterapi
- (1985) Kierkegaards filosofi (2nd edition 1992, 3rd edition 1999)
- (1988) Latterens lyst (2nd edition 1995)
- (1988) Drømmens veje
- (1989) Narkissos og Ekko
- (1989) Alice Miller
- (1990) Kønnet, kroppen og selvet
- (1991) Selvpsykologi (2nd edition. 1998)
- (1992) Den europæiske krop
- (1993) Det onde
- (1994) Livet må forstås baglæns, men må leves forlæns
- (1995) Det gode (2nd edition. 1997, 3rd edition. 2001)
- (1996) Man bør tvivle om alt - og tro på meget, introduction to philosophy
- (1997) Jeg er ikke noget menneske - jeg er dynamit
- (1998) 5 danske filosoffer fra det 19. århundrede
- (1998) Det skønne (2nd edition 2001)
- (1999) Det sande (2nd edition 2001)
- (1999) Nietzsches filosofi
- (2000) Kødets lyst - tankens list
- (2001) Den bedste af alle verdener
- (2002) Den kløvede eros
- (2003) Livets mening - eller blot lidt sammenhæng og perspektiv
