= Peter Danko =

American inventor, designer, and artist

- Born: 1949 (age 76–77); Washington, D.C., U.S.
- Education: University of Maryland, College Park
- Occupations: Inventor; designer; artist

Peter Danko (born 1949) is an American inventor, designer, and artist. He focuses on creating sustainable designs that center on living in harmony with nature and creating a comfortable future. His work often involves re-purposing and recycling and he prefers to use resources he calls OMG: materials which can be seen by the casual eye to Obviously Manifest Green.

== Early life ==
Danko was born in 1949, in Washington, D.C. He attended college with the intention of becoming an illustrator. In 1971, he received an undergraduate degree in fine arts and art history from the University of Maryland, College Park.

== Career ==
Danko's work been curated by and is in the permanent collection of many museums, including the Museum of Modern Art, the Cooper-Hewitt Museum, the Museum of Fine Arts, Boston, and the Smithsonian American Art Museum. Danko has received the best of NeoCon Silver Award for chair design in 1998, IDSA Certificate of Achievement in 1983, and National Endowment for the Arts Design Fellowships in 1980 and 1975. He has been featured in many books, including Objects for Use: Handmade by Design by Paul J. Smith and Furniture with Soul: Master Woodworkers and Their Craft by David Savage.
