= Peter Bultink =

Belgian singer and musician

Peter Bultink is a Belgian singer and musician from Brussels who plays in various styles including rock, funk, dance, and French chanson. He has released 4 studio albums and is a successful artist in France.

His origins lie in Ostend, Belgium. His recognition comes in 2004, when he won the Biennale de la chanson française with his project Orchestre du Mouvement Perpétuel, which was an unusual combination of Bultink's dance and electronic compositions and Alejandro Petrasso, an Argentinian classical piano virtuoso. They toured in France, Switzerland, Greece and Canada.

In 2011, Bultink started a solo career and cooperates with Serge Feys (T.C. Matic), who already produced the two albums of the Orchestre du Mouvement Perpétuel.

In 2016, Peter Bultink revives the Orchestre du Mouvement Perpétuel, with a new line-up : Cloé Defossez (machines, piano, keyboards, voices) and Céline Chappuis (cello, voices)
