= Peter Mavimenus =

Damascene Christian martyr

Saint Peter Mavimenus

Martyr
- Died: 743 AD; Damascus, Umayyad Caliphate
- Venerated in: Catholic Church
- Feast: 21 February

Peter Mavimenus was a Damascene Christian martyr of the 8th century whose martyrdom is recorded in the Roman Martyrology. He was killed by a group of Arabs who visited him while he was sick after he said to them: "Whoever does not embrace the Christian and Catholic faith, is damned like your false prophet Mahomet."
