= Peter Hoeher =

German engineer

Peter Hoeher from the university of Kiel, Germany was named Fellow of the Institute of Electrical and Electronics Engineers (IEEE) in 2014 for contributions to decoding and detection that include reliability information.
