= House at 130 Mohegan Avenue =

Historic house in Connecticut, United States

- U.S. National Register of Historic Places
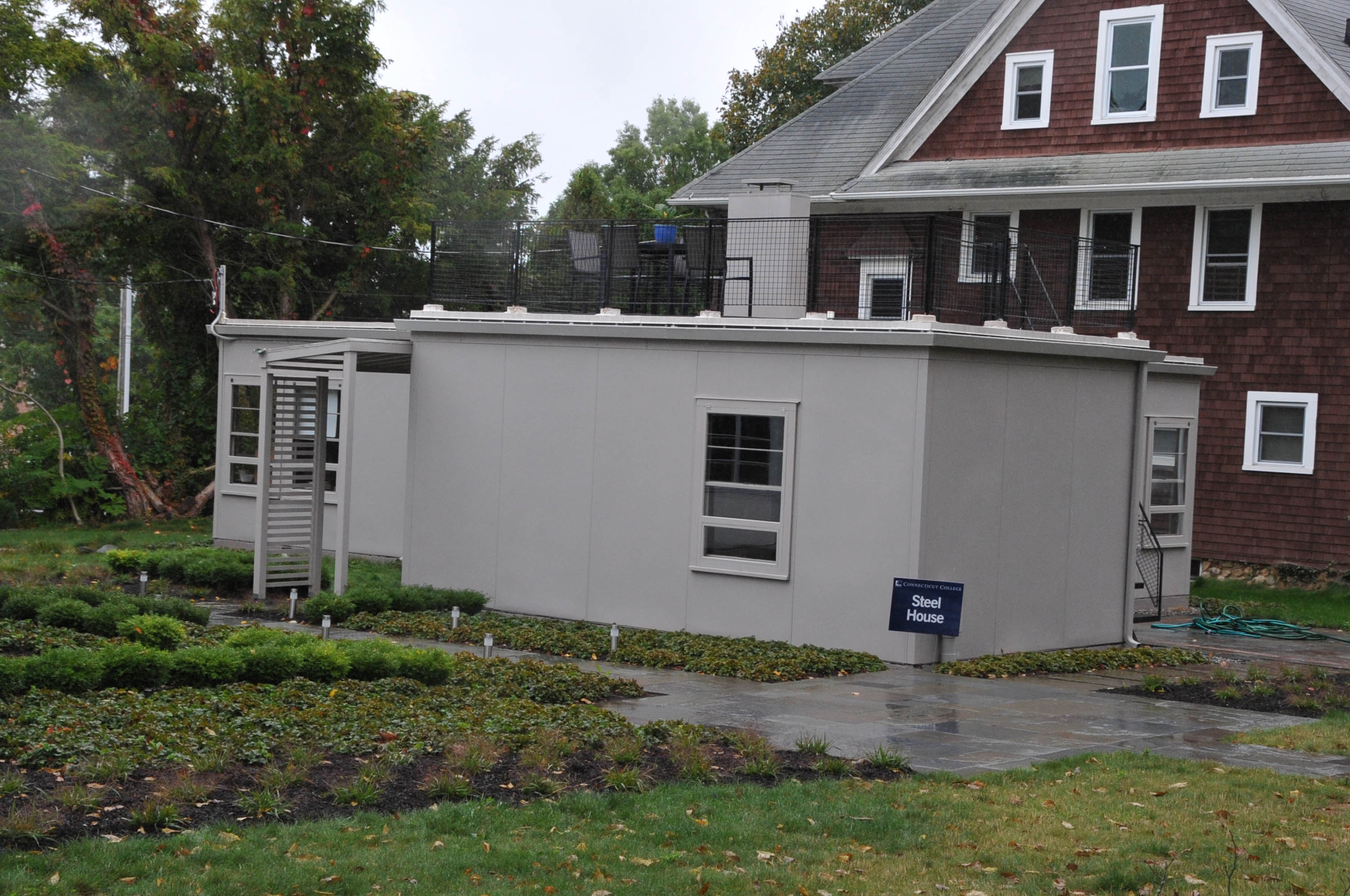

- Location within Connecticut Location within the United States
- Location: 130 Mohegan Avenue, New London, Connecticut, United States
- Coordinates: 41°22′29″N 72°6′9″W
- Built: 1933
- Architect: Howard T. Fisher
- Architectural style: International style
- NRHP reference No.: 08001379
- Added to NRHP: October 28, 2009

The House at 130 Mohegan Avenue, also known as Rusty, the House of Steel or Steel House, is a prefabricated, modular, International Style house in New London, Connecticut, United States. The House was designed by Howard T. Fisher, who founded General Houses, Inc. in 1932. Winslow Ames, a professor of art history at Connecticut College and the art director of the Lyman Allyn Museum, had the home built after attending the Century of Progress Exposition in Chicago. The House is a single story 21 feet (6.4 m) by 37 feet (11 m) rectangular steel prefabricated home that rests upon a concrete slab. It originally had a flat roof and included an attached garage. Throughout the years, the house has undergone significant alteration, including the addition of a gable roof.

The house was used by Ames, and later by Connecticut College, as a rental property, until the structure was slated for demolition in 2004. The push to restore the house is credited to Doug Royalty, who worked with the college's Abigail Van Slyck. Completed in 2013, restoration cost $500,000 and involved several phases, including the dismantling, transportation, and reassembly of the house. The house was added to the Connecticut Historic Register in July 2007 and it was added to the National Register of Historic Places on October 28, 2009.

== Construction and use ==
The house was designed by Howard T. Fisher, who founded General Houses, Inc., and commissioned by Winslow Ames, a professor of art history at Connecticut College and the art director of the Lyman Allyn Museum. In 1933, Ames decided to construct two houses on the museum-owned property after seeing prefabricated homes at the Century of Progress Exposition in Chicago. Ames had a strong interest in the Modernism movement and believed such houses would become predominant.

Completed in November 1933 and costing about $4,500 in total, the House is a single story 21 feet (6.4 m) by 37 feet (11 m) rectangular steel prefabricated home that rests upon a concrete slab. The house is frameless, with the weight borne by 4 feet (1.2 m) by 9 feet (2.7 m) steel panels; the exterior panels are flanged and vertically bolted through wooden T-shaped pieces. The interior wall panels are made of steel and filled with insulation. Originally the house had a flat roof, but it changed to a gable roof at an unknown time. The house has two bedrooms, one bathroom, and an open living-dining-kitchen space. The house also has an attached garage.

After its completion, Winslow Ames used the house as a rental property until 1949 when he went to work in a museum in Springfield, Missouri. The house was sold to Connecticut College. Connecticut College continued to rent it to staff and students until 2004, when plans were made to demolish the house. Changing the flat roof to a gable roof was a significant alteration from the original plan; the date of the alteration is unknown, but it preceded 1995.

== Restoration ==
In 2008, an article in The Day stated that the push to restore the house came from conservation specialist Doug Royalty, who was researching prefabricated homes from the 1920s and 1930s. Royalty approached Abigail Van Slyck, the chairwoman of Connecticut College's art history department and architectural studies program about the house. The Day referred to the house's historic value as a new discovery, but its history was included in the Winslow Ames House National Register of Historic Places nomination in 1995. The Winslow Ames House nomination detailed the House's origin, but criticized its gable roof modification. After its re-discovery, Connecticut College began collecting grants to restore the house under the direction of Royalty and Van Slyck. Royalty stated that the House and Winslow Ames House are very rare, with only a few surviving examples in the United States.

In April 2007, the leaking roof was repaired. In December 2007, the House received a $28,500 grant from the Dr. Scholl Foundation. The grant was used to complete lead-paint abatement, which would make conducting other restoration work safer. By 2010, the Dr. Scholl Foundation granted another $50,000 and a family foundation provided another $50,000 for the restoration. It was reported that other college grants totaling $15,500 were given for preservation planning, in part by the Connecticut Trust for Historic Preservation. It was reported in May 2010 that a matching grant of $101,500 was given to Connecticut College from the Connecticut Commission on Culture and Tourism, which provided the funding for the next phase of renovations for restoring the House.

The celebration for the House's completed restoration was held in October 2013. The cost of restoration totaled around $500,000. The building was dismantled, transported to Philadelphia for restoration and treatment for rust resistance, and then reassembled on the campus. The work was performed by Milner + Carr, a conservation company. The house was added to the Connecticut Historic Register in July 2007 and it was added to the National Register of Historic Places on October 28, 2009.

== See also ==
- National Register of Historic Places listings in New London County, Connecticut
- Winslow Ames House - Historic prefabricated Motohome in the immediate vicinity.
