= Rockwell King DuMoulin =

American architect (1906–1983)

- Born: January 31, 1906; Chicago, Illinois, U.S.
- Died: February 11, 1983 (aged 77); South Kingstown, Rhode Island, U.S.
- Education: Columbia University; American Academy in Rome; École des Beaux-Arts at Fontainebleau
- Occupation: Architect
- Parent(s): Frank du Moulin; Ethel Rockwell King
- Practice: Rockwell K. DuMoulin
- Buildings: Arthur Little House; Winslow Ames House; The Watch Hill Beach Club

Rockwell King DuMoulin (January 31, 1906 – February 11, 1983) was an American architect and professor and department chair at the Rhode Island School of Design. He was keenly interested in Modern style and developed a coastal vernacular architecture.

== Early life ==
DuMoulin was born in Chicago, Illinois. His parents were Ethel Rockwell King and Frank DuMoulin, an Episcopal minister. His paternal grandfather, John Phillip DuMoulin, was the Church of England's Bishop of Nicaragua. A resident of Toronto, Rev. DuMoulin accepted various position in Chicago and Cleveland between 1885 and 1899, eventually becoming Dean of the Diocese of Ohio and ex-officio rector of Trinity Cathedral in Cleveland in 1906. Thus, DuMoulin spent his childhood in Cleveland and Gambier, Ohio with a Chicagoan mother and a Canadian father.

He attended Columbia University, receiving his A.B. in 1928. While at Columbia, he was a member of the fraternity St. Anthony Hall and was managing editor of Jester, the campus newspaper. Next, he studied architecture at École des Beaux-Arts at Fontainebleau, graduating in 1931. Returning to Columbia, he received a graduate degree in architecture in 1932. He also attended the American Academy in Rome.

In 1939, he received a Charles Follen McKim Fellowship in Architecture from Columbia University. This fellowship is for study and travel after graduation.

== Career ==
In 1932, The New York Times stated that DuMoulin was an architect in New York City. In 1936, he visited Sibley Smith Jr., an artist friend, at in Matunuck, Rhode Island where Smith's father was a successful landscape architect. This visit was pivotal for DuMoulin as he started his architectural practice in Matunuck that same year. He was registered to practice in Rhode Island, New York, and Washington, D.C.

During and after World War II, he was active in relief efforts in Europe, working as an architect and consultant in rehabilitation and redevelopment. He was a housing expert and city planner with the United Nations Relief and Rehabilitation Administration from 1944 to 1947. In 1947, he worked with the Institute of Inter-American Affairs in Costa Rica and Chile]. He continued to work for the Institute of Inter-American Affairs from 1949 through 1954, traveling to Bolivia, Columbia], Dominican Republic, Ecuador, El Salvador, Guatemala, Haiti, Honduras, Mexico, Nicaragua, Panama, Paraguay, and Peru. He eventually visited or worked in more than fifty countries.

Because of his work abroad, DuMoulin became a student and architect of rammed-earth construction, writing an article advocating its benefits in 1938. As a later writer noted, "DuMoulin, writing in a consumer magazine, summarized the opposition’s reasoning very shrewdly. He pointed out that there is no profit to anyone in rammed-earth except the man who is going to live in the house, and for that reason, no industry has seen fit to publicize the method."

In the 1950s, DuMoulin returned to his architectural practice in Wakefield, Rhode Island, becoming "locally prominent." He was most interested in Modern architectural style. He said, "We are no longer confined to a rigidly circumscribed volume, or series of volumes, defined by solid masses. We are free to seek an architectural expression of our scientific and industrial civilization, and the new relationship with time and space that it has brought to us, in a pattern of interrelated planes and surfaces which vary in structure, texture, form, extent, and arrangement to suit their functional or artistic purpose."

Many of his commissions were for houses in Rhode Island's resort communities. There, he created a coastal vernacular that was a "mix of Modern design, traditional materials, and sensitive siting." His houses featured low rooflines, weathered shingles, and wide expanses of glass.

Some of his early jobs were for family and friends, which allowed him to experiment with the new Modernist style. In South Kingston, Rhode Island, he designed the Modernist style clubhouse for the Willow Dell Beach Club in 1938—a commission secured through his father-in-law Nathaniel Waite Smith. This clubhouse has since been replaced, but the new building resembles the 1938 plan and was designed by Sandy Taylor, a former student and design associate of DuMoulin.

In 1942, his friend Sibley Smith Jr. commissioned a house in Perryville, Rhode Island. DuMoulin's design for Smith was featured in Pencil Points: The Magazine of Progressive Architecture which noted, "The owners wanted a good house designed for their particular needs rather than one that would impress the neighbors or echo an old tradition, and the architect was both sympathetic to this sensible approach and competent to carry through a fresh, creative design without apology or qualification." The Sibley Smith Jr. house has been called “a handsomely modest example of its type—a hopeful image for a time which strove to incorporate the best of what was modern with the best of a regional vernacular.

He also designed a house for a fraternity brother and art historian Winslow Ames in Saunderstown, Rhode Island. Ames's instructions to DuMoulin indicate the trust and freedom his friends gave the architect. Ames recalled, "We told him that what we wanted was a reasonably flexible house. We had not yet come to the point of solar heating, or it would not have been oriented the way it is. It's exactly diagonal to the compass points. So west is there, and north is there. And he did a beautiful job for us, and I think the house is extraordinarily flexible."

In 1955 and 1956, DuMoulin designed a bathing pavilion and clubhouse for the Watch Hill Beach Club. Watch Hill Beach Club had lost three clubhouses to hurricanes and was no longer able to secure traditional or federal insurance. Yet, its members still wanted comfortable access to their beach. DuMoulin came up with solutions that so cleverly engineered against storms that Lloyd's of London insured the new building at half the prior rate. He combined deep-driven piles with designing and orienting the building to provide minimum surface resistance to the waves and wind. The Watch Hill Beach Club was featured in Architectural Record magazine in September 1956.

Also in 1955, DuMoulin designed a new beach pavilion for the Misquamicut Club which similarly lost its building with Hurricane Carol. The new beach pavilion was built high on the dune so that storm waters could pass under it, and windows and walls could be opened to allow strong winds to pass through. In a guidebook to New England architecture, the Museum of Modern Art recognized the Misquamicut Club "as a fine example of design respecting environmental conditions." The building was never tested by a hurricane, but was replaced in 2005 due to its deterioration.

DuMoulin also designed the Arthur Little House, a contributing building to The Dunes Club National Register of Historic Places listing. Built in 1968, "the one-story, wood-shingled, heavily-glazed residence is a fine example of mid-20th-century Modern residential architecture in Rhode Island." The Little House was built into a dune; its design fits the setting, has storm-resistant features, and is architecturally compatible with The Dunes Club.

In 1959, DuMoulin, along with architects Marie and James Howell of Providence, Rhode Island, won an Education Citation Award from the Annual Design Awards Program sponsored by Progressive Architecture magazine. The award was given for the proposed design for Haystack Mountain School of Crafts at Deer Island, Maine. The project included studios and workshops, housing, and a common use building with dining and kitchen facilities, exhibition space, offices, and lounge. However, their design was not selected for implementation.

DuMoulin was also a professor and chair of the architecture department at the Rhode Island School of Design from 1972 to 1978. He retired in 1978.

== Projects ==
Following is a selective list of DuMoulin's projects:

Project name	Client	Location	Date	Reference
Willow Dell Beach Club House	Willow Dell Beach Club	South Kingstown, Rhode Island	1938	
Club House	Watch Hill Yacht Club	Watch Hill, Rhode Island	1938	
Firewater Farm		South Kingstown, Rhode Island	1940	
Residence	Watson family	South Kingstown, Rhode Island	circa 1940	
Sibley Smith Jr. House	Sibley Smith Jr.	Perryville, Rhode Island	1941	
Commodore House		South Kingstown, Rhode Island	1942	
Frederick Lippitt Camp House	Frederick Lippitt Camp	South Kingstown, Rhode Island	circa 1950s	
Elizabeth Perkins House	Elizabeth Perkins	South Kingstown, Rhode Island	1954	
Beach Pavilion	Misquamicut Club	Watch Hill, Rhode Island	1954-55	
Beach Cabanas	Watch Hill Yacht Club	Watch Hill, Rhode Island	1955	
Club House and Bathing Pavilion	Watch Hill Beach Club	Watch Hill, Rhode Island	1955-56	
Winslow Ames House	Winslow Ames	Saunderstown, Rhode Island	1959	
Davide S. Baker House	David S. Baker	Narragansett, Rhode Island	1967	
Arthur Little House	Royal Little	Narragansett, Rhode Island	1968	
Pond House	Margaret Lee Howe	South Kingstown, Rhode Island	1973	

== Publications ==
- "Rammed Earth Construction." Consumer's Digest, vol. 6, no. 3, September, 1939, pp. 41–45.
- "Modern Architecture." Community Art Project Calendar of Art Events, vol. 7, no. 3 January 1940, p. 2.

== Professional affiliations ==
DuMoulin was a member of the Rhode Island Chapter of the American Institute of Architects (AIA), serving as its secretary from 1941 to 1942, its vice president from 1956 to 1958, and its president from 1958 to 1960. He was also his chapter's representative to the AIA New England Regional Council from 1958 to 1968. He was elected as an AIA Fellow in 1974.

In 1950, he was one of sixteen architects named by the U.S. Department of State to the sixth Pan–American Congress on Architects which was held in Havana, Cuba. DuMoulin would attend the Pan–American Congress of Architects again for the eighth Congress in Mexico City in 1952 and the tenth Congress in Buenos Aires in 1960. He was also program director for the 11th Congress which was held in Washington, D.C.

In 1950, he was one of sixteen architects named by the U.S. Department of State to the 6th Pan–American Congress on Architects which was held in Havana, Cuba. DuMoulin would attend the Pan–American Congress of Architects again for the 8th Congress in Mexico City in 1952 and the 10th Congress in Buenos Aires in 1960. He was also program director for the 11th Congress which was held in Washington, D.C.

== Personal life ==
DuMoulin met his future wife at the wedding of fraternity brother Winslow Ames. He married Mary Weeden Smith Burke who was from a prominent family from both Providence, Rhode Island and Matunuck, Rhode Island on May 20, 1932. The marriage ceremony was performed by DuMoulin's father. It was the bride's second marriage—her father was Nathaniel Waites Smith. They had two sons, John DuMoulin and Philip DuMoulin. The family lived in Matunuck.

DuMoulin died in South Kingstown, Rhode Island in 1983 at the age of 77.
