= John Bothwell (bishop) =

Canadian Anglican bishop and author (1926–2014)

John Charles Bothwell (29 June 1926 – 28 January 2014) was a Canadian Anglican bishop and author in the second half of the 20th century.

Bothwell was educated at Trinity College Toronto and ordained in 1951. His first ministry position was at St James’ Cathedral, Toronto. He was then made senior assistant priest at Christ Church Cathedral, Vancouver before incumbencies at Oakville, Dundas and Hamilton. He was Director of Programs for the Diocese of Niagara and then its coadjutor bishop.

He was the diocesan Bishop of Niagara from 1973 to 1985 and Archbishop of Niagara and Metropolitan of Ontario from then until 1991. From 1991 to 2003 he was Chancellor of Trinity College, Toronto.

Bothwell retired to Hamilton, Ontario, and died in 2014 at Burlington, Ontario.

Anglican Communion titles
Preceded by Walter Edward Bagnall	Bishop of Niagara; 1973–1991	Succeeded by Walter Gordon Asbil
Preceded by Lewis Samuel Garnsworthy	Metropolitan of Ontario; 1985–1991	Succeeded by Edwin Keith Lackey
