= Ralph Spence (bishop) =

Canadian retired Anglican bishop (born 1942)

The Right Reverend Ralph Spence FRHSC
- Bishop of Niagara
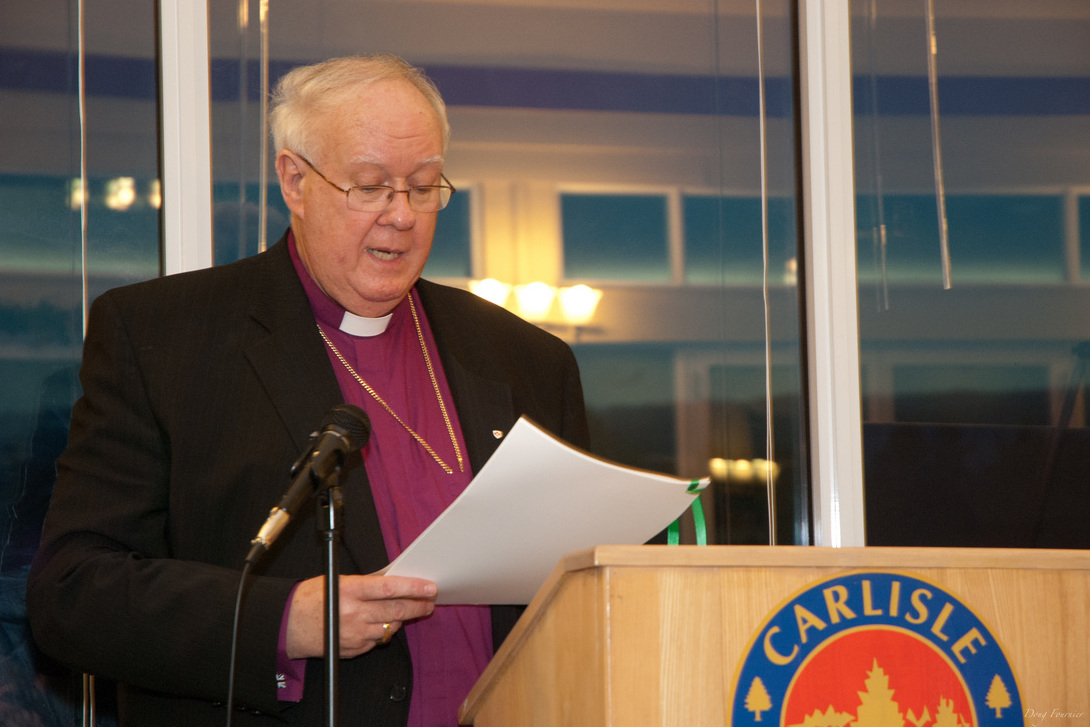
- David Ralph Spence during a speech presentation
- Church: Anglican Church of Canada
- Diocese: Niagara
- Elected: 1997
- In office: 1998–2008
- Predecessor: Walter Asbil
- Successor: Michael Bird

Orders
- Ordination: 1968 by Walter Bagnall
- Consecration: 1997

Personal details
- Born: David Ralph Spence; March 10, 1942 Hamilton, Ontario, Canada
- Denomination: Anglican
- Spouse: Carol Spence
- Education: McMaster University; Wycliffe College, Toronto

David Ralph Spence FRHSC is a Canadian retired Anglican bishop.

== Life and vocation ==
Spence was born on 10 March 1942 in Hamilton, Ontario. He received a B.A. degree from McMaster University, Hamilton in 1964 and a L.Th. from Wycliffe College, Toronto in 1968. He was ordained a deacon on 5 May 1968 and then a priest on 1 December 1968 by Bishop Walter Bagnall. Spence was an assistant curate at St. George’s Guelph (1968-1970) and then the rector of St. Bartholomew's Hamilton (1970 -1974). After further incumbencies at St. John's Thorold (1975-1982) and St. Luke’s Burlington (1982-1997) he became the Archdeacon of Trafalgar in 1992 until his consecration to the episcopate as Bishop of Niagara on 21 September 1997 at Christ's Church Cathedral. He was installed at that same cathedral as the tenth Bishop of Niagara on 11 January 1998 and he retired on 29 February 2008.

In 2008, Spence became the Chancellor of Renison University College, Waterloo, serving until 2016.

== Heraldry and vexillology ==
The arms of The Rt. Rev. David Ralph Spence
- Armiger: David Ralph Spence
- Adopted: September 24, 1973
- Crest: A beaver sejant Or on a grassy mound Vert holding a banner of the Arms.
- Shield: Or a lion rampant Gules within a bordure Vert, over all a bend nebuly Sable, in dexter chief a canton voided Gules.
- Motto: "JUBILATE DEO" (Latin phrase is the opening of Psalm 100 and is translated as “Make a joyful noise onto the Lord”)

Since his youth, Spence has had a passion for flags (or vexillology) and heraldry. He has designed numerous personal coats of arms (including his own), coats of arms for churches in the Diocese of Niagara as well as for communities and organizations in Ontario. In 1981, he became a Fellow of the Royal Heraldry Society of Canada. For his contributions to Canadian heraldry, in 2006 he was appointed Herald Extraordinary with the Canadian Heraldic Authority and in 2007 he was given the title "Albion Herald Extraordinary" by the Governor General of Canada.

An avid collector of flags, Spence's collection once sat at approximately 3000 items, including a variety of historical Canadian flags as well as flags gifted to him by Queen Elizabeth II. Most of his collection has now been donated to the Canadian Heraldic Authority at Rideau Hall to remain forever a part of the Canadian treasure. A large part of his collection has been gifted to the Canadian Flag Collection, a permanent exhibit housed at Settlers, Rails & Trails Inc., Argyle, Manitoba. Over 250 flags were donated to the museum in Argyle and arrived on National Flag of Canada Day, February 15, 2018.

Bishop Spence has been involved in the design of a variety of coats of arms and flags for individuals, municipalities, and institutions, including:

- The City of Hamilton, Ontario
- The City of St. Catharines, Ontario
- Redeemer University College
- The Royal Canadian Military Institute
- The Town of Niagara-on-the-Lake
- Bishop Michael Bird
- Renison University College
Flag of the City of Hamilton, Ontario designed by D. Ralph Spence

Flag of Niagara-on-the-Lake, Ontario designed by D. Ralph Spence

== Renison University College ==
In 2008, Spence was invested as Chancellor of Renison University College at St. George's of Forest Hill Anglican Church in Kitchener, Ontario. At his investiture, Bishop Spence and his wife, Carol, donated to the college a ceremonial mace for use at the college's convocation ceremony and other official events.

Renison’s mace is made of local wood from the Waterloo area and fashioned by local artisans. It follows the shape of most maces with a crown, a bowl, and a wooden shaft. The Mace is to be carried by an honoured member of the College in front of the Chancellor at Convocations and special ceremonies.

The crown is carved with maple leaves and trilliums, reflecting the institution of the Crown in Canada and Ontario. The bowl has three coats of arms; Renison University College, University of Waterloo, and the personal arms of Bishop Spence. Carved moose heads, derived from the crest of the coat of arms, support the bowl.

Down the shaft of the mace is the small coat of arms belonging to The Rev. Canon David Bowyer, Honorary Senior Fellow of Renison and painter of the arms located on the mace.

Spence later donated two processional staves, to be carried by students of the college, to lead academic processions. Each stave bears Renison's shield and badge of the college surmounted by a crown of maple leaves and trilliums. They represent the two halves of Renison's student body: the residents and the academic students.

In 2014, Renison University College applied for and was granted supporters for its coat of arms by the Canadian Heraldic Authority. Spence, Albion Herald Extraordinary, was a lead designer for this grant.

At the end of his two terms as Chancellor of Renison University College, Spence was made Chancellor Emeritus of the College in 2016, in recognition of his outstanding support of and leadership to the college. This is an honour only granted to two previous chancellors of Renison.

== Honours and awards ==
- appointed a canon of Christ's Church Cathedral - 1980
- awarded Queen's Silver Jubilee Medal - 1977
- awarded 125th Anniversary of the Confederation of Canada Medal - 1992
- awarded D.D. (Honorary), Wycliffe College, Toronto - 1999
- awarded D.D. (Honorary), Trinity College, Toronto - 2000
- awarded Queen's Golden Jubilee Medal - 2002
- awarded D.D. (Honorary), Huron College, University of Western Ontario, London - 2005
- awarded Queen Elizabeth II Diamond Jubilee Medal - 2012
- appointed Chancellor Emeritus of Renison University College, affiliated with the University of Waterloo - 2016
- Awarded Queen's Platinum Jubilee Medal - 2022
Ribbon of the Queen Elizabeth II Silver Jubilee Medal

Ribbon of the 125th Anniversary of the Confederation of Canada Medal

Ribbon of the Queen Elizabeth II Golden Jubilee Medal

Ribbon of the Queen Elizabeth II Diamond Jubilee Medal

Anglican Communion titles
Preceded by Walter Asbil	Bishop of Niagara; 1997–2008	Succeeded by Michael Bird
