= St. George's Church (Georgetown, Ontario) =

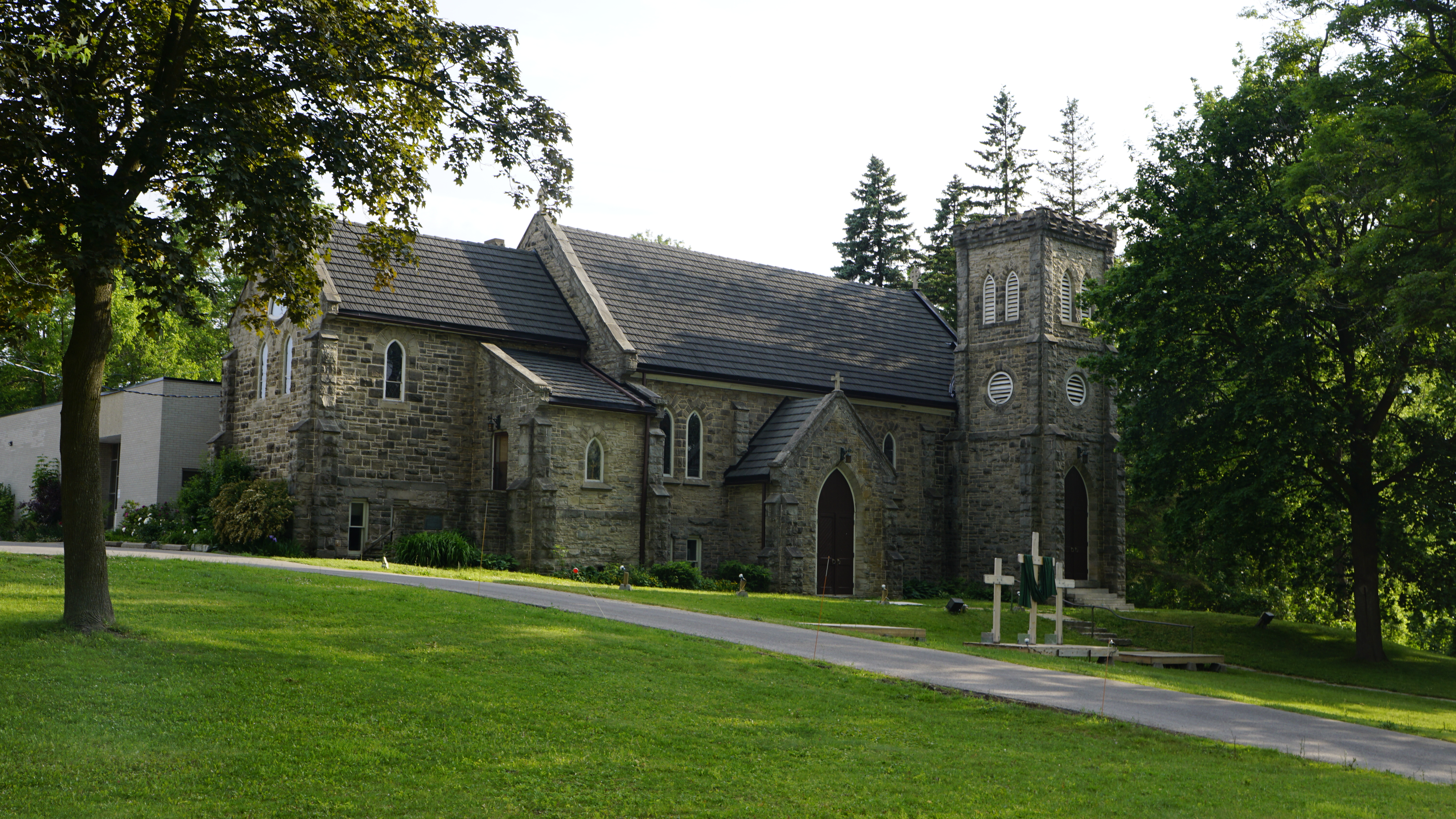

- Location of St. George's in Ontario St. George's Church (Ontario) St. George's Church (Southern Ontario)
- 43.65078°N 79.92235°W
- Location: 60 Guelph Street, Georgetown, Ontario
- Country: Canada
- Denomination: Anglican
- Churchmanship: Evangelical
- Website: www.stgeorgesgeorgetown.com

History
- Status: Parish church

Architecture
- Functional status: Active
- Groundbreaking: July 25, 1878
- Completed: December 29, 1878

Administration
- Province: Ecclesiastical Province of Ontario
- Diocese: Anglican Diocese of Niagara
- Parish: St. George's Church (Georgetown, Ontario)

Clergy
- Rector: Reverend Canon Cheryl Barker

St. George's Church, Georgetown, Ontario, is a parish church of the Anglican Church of Canada, in the Anglican Diocese of Niagara.

== History ==
St. George's Church was officially established in 1852 with the appointment of the parish's first full-time priest, The Reverend Thomas W. Marsh. The first St. George's Church was built in the late eighteen forties on land donated to the church by Mr. and Mrs. George Kennedy. The original church was a plain frame structure with tower and spire. It contained straight box pews and in the centre was a square enclosure used by the choir; the music being supplied by a small cabinet organ.

The first baptism recorded was of John Cook, farmer, Esquesing, who was born January 24, 1812, and who was baptized August 3, 1852, by the rector, Thomas Marsh. The first Confirmation was held on June 3, 1855, and was conducted by the Bishop of Toronto. The first Marriage performed at St. George's was celebrated on March 12, 1856, between William Long and Ann Price by the Rev'd Thomas Marsh. The first burial recorded in the registry of St. George's was for Thomas Manson Thompson, on September 30, 1852. And the first burial recorded in St. George's Burial Ground was Evan Price on June 2, 1855, also by the Rector, Thomas Marsh.

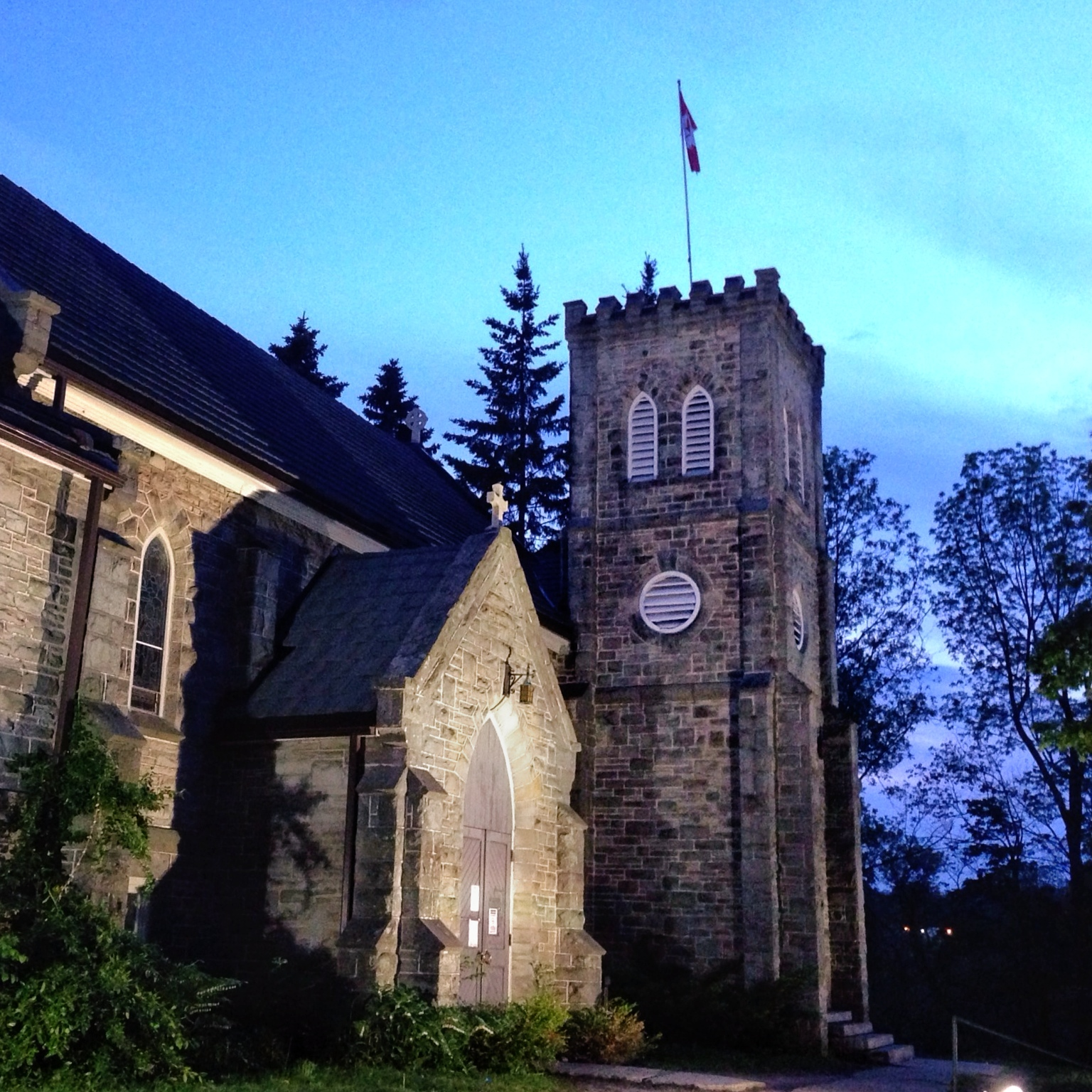
The present stone building with tower, built in 1878.

On July 25, 1878, the corner stone for the current stone building was laid and on December 29, 1878, the church was officially opened by Bishop Fuller. In the 1880s the rectory, for the priest and their family to live in was constructed on the land on the east side of the church. In 1921, an extension to the chancel was added making room for an organ chamber and below it a kitchen and a church school room. The following year, in 1922, St. George's began to hold Communion services each week, rather than the traditional once a month.

In 1973, St. George's parish hall was constructed where the old drive shed had once stood. In 2005, the rectory house was torn down due to mould.

== Services ==
There are two weekly services. Sunday service: 10:00 a.m. the full Anglican Choral Eucharist service using the Book of Alternative Services, and Thursday at 10:00 a.m. is the midweek Eucharist.

=== Messy Church and Family Ministry ===
In April 2007 St. George's became the first church in Canada to join the Messy Church initiative. St. George's offers family ministry events throughout the year.

== Parish Rectors ==
- The Reverend Thomas W. Marsh 1852 – 1856
- The Reverend J. D. A. Mackenzie 1856 – 1859
- The Reverend F. A. O'Meara 1859–1862
- The Reverend H. C. Webbe 1862 – 1866
- The Reverend Johnstone Vicars 1866 – 1868
- The Reverend F. I. S. Groves 1868 – 1869
- The Reverend Colin C. Johnson 1870 – 1875
- The Reverend Arthur Boultbee 1875 – 1880
- The Reverend G. B. Cook 1880 – 1882
- The Reverend R. C. Caswall 1882 – 1884
- The Reverend C. G. Adams 1885 – 1886
- The Reverend Joseph Fennell 1886 – 1898
- The Reverend E. A. Vesey 1899 – 1901
- The Reverend T. G. Wallace 1901 – 1904
- The Reverend Ian A. R. MacDonald 1904 – 1906
- The Reverend Robert Atkinson 1906 – 1908
- The Reverend A. B. Higginson 1909 – 1916
- The Reverend William Burt 1916 – 1920
- The Reverend Percival Mayes 1920 – 1926
- The Reverend Frederick C. Wase 1926 – 1931
- The Venerable William G. O. Thompson 1932 – 1954
- The Reverend Kenneth S. G. Richardson 1954 – 1961
- The Venerable John H. McMulkin 1962 – 1966
- The Reverend Eric C. Mills 1966 – 1971
- The Reverend Robert Gallagher 1971 – 1978
- The Reverend Roswell Tees 1979 – 1981
- The Reverend James B. Boyles 1981 – 1987
- The Reverend Canon Tom Kingston 1988 -2002
- The Reverend Canon Robert W. A. Park 2002 – 2020
- The Reverend Canon Cheryl Barker 2022 – present

== See also ==
- Wilbur Lake
