= Robert Addison =

Robert Addison may refer to:

- Robert Addison (missionary) (1754–1829), Canadian clergyman and missionary of the Church of England
- Robert Brydges Addison (1854–1920), English composer, choirmaster and teacher
- Robert Addison Norman, Canadian politician
- Bob Addison (Robert Newman Addison, 1908–1988), Australian rules footballer
