= Winslow Ames House =

Historic house in Connecticut

- U.S. National Register of Historic Places
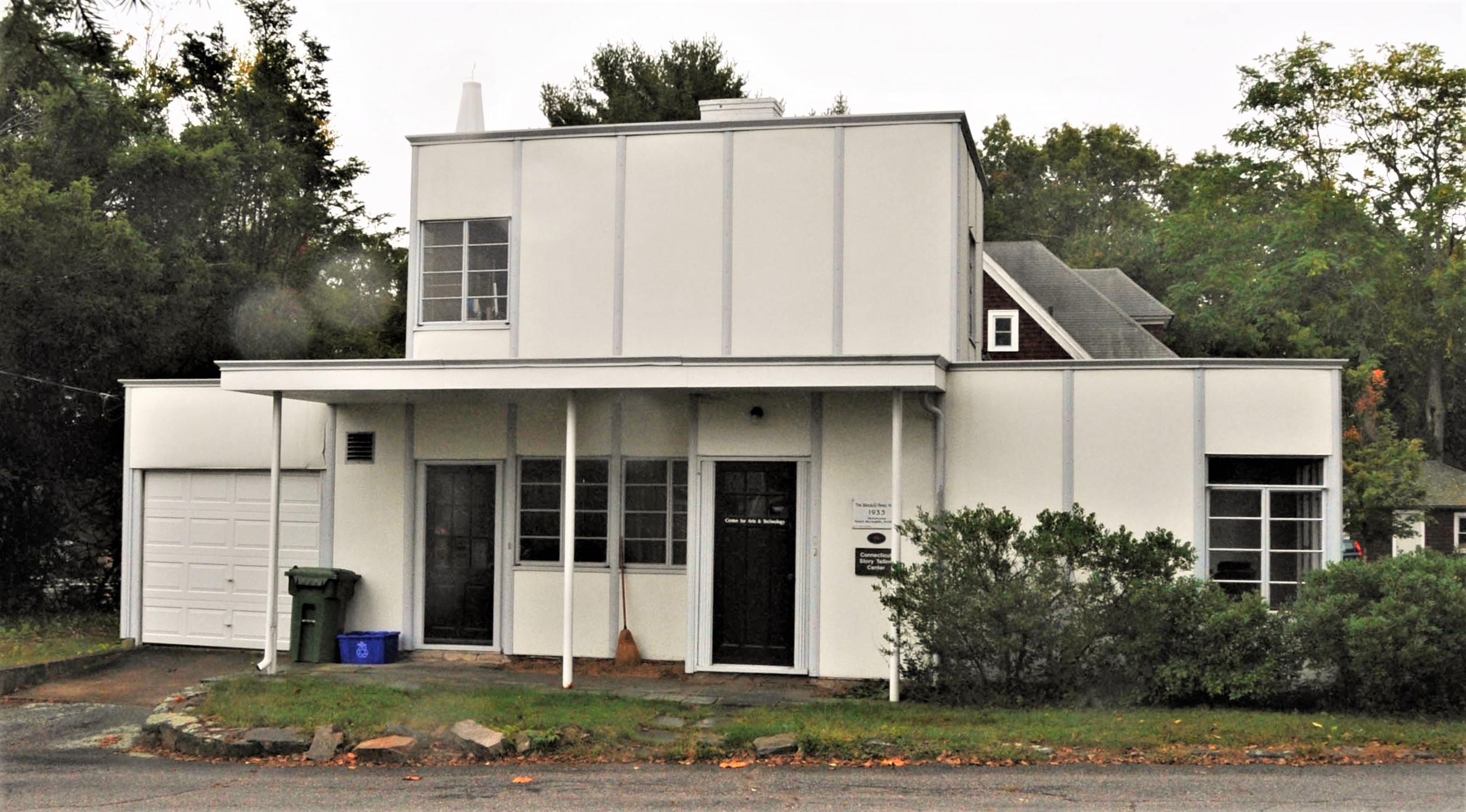
- Winslow Ames House on the grounds of the Lyman Allyn Art Museum

- Location within Connecticut Location within the United States
- Location: 132 Mohegan Avenue, New London, Connecticut
- Coordinates: 41°22′34″N 72°6′9″W
- Area: less than one acre
- Built: 1933
- Architect: Robert W. McLaughlin Jr.
- Architectural style: International style
- NRHP reference No.: 95000283
- Added to NRHP: March 23, 1995

The Winslow Ames House is a prefabricated modular International Style house in New London, Connecticut. It was designed by Robert W. McLaughlin Jr. and was built in 1933. Winslow Ames was a professor of art history at Connecticut College and the art director of the Lyman Allyn Museum, and he had the home built after attending the Century of Progress Exposition in Chicago. It was constructed for $7,500, one of two surviving Motohomes produced by McLaughlin's company American Houses Inc. The modular house is composed of three rectangles and a flat roof constructed on a concrete slab with a welded steel framework. It was made with asbestos panels and features a core component that provides the heating and plumbing functions for the house. The other two modules feature two bedrooms and a one-car garage.

Ames and his family lived in the house briefly, but Connecticut College acquired it in 1949 and used it for faculty housing until 1986. It was in a state of disrepair by 1989 and was considered a hazard, due to its construction with asbestos panels. It was slated to be demolished, but Hendrickson rallied support to save it after uncovering its history. A restoration and rehabilitation project was completed in 1994 and it was listed on the National Register of Historic Places in 1995.

== Construction ==
The Winslow Ames House is a modular home that was constructed on a concrete slab with a welded steel framework. It was designed by John B. McLaughlin Jr., who co-founded American Houses Inc. in 1932. McLaughlin's designs focused on inexpensive housing through mass production using new materials and technology. The International Style house was modular and intended to allow easy enlargement, dismantling, and relocation if needed. The houses were called "Motohomes" and featured modular "motounits" that contained heating and plumbing equipment. World War II made steel unavailable for civilian use, affecting the construction of these homes. After the war, prefabricated homes were typically made of wood, while offices were normally constructed of steel and concrete.

The house bears the name of Winslow Ames, a professor of art history at Connecticut College and the art director of the Lyman Allyn Museum. In 1933, Ames decided to construct two houses on museum-owned property after seeing prefabricated homes at the Century of Progress Exposition in Chicago. (Note: The Winslow Ames House nomination form notes that the General Houses prefabricated House at 130 Mohegan Avenue was modified significantly with a gable roof. Since its listing, the house has undergone a restoration and the gable roof has been removed. As a result, both of the NRHP nomination forms do not reflect the current state of the House at 130 Mohegan Avenue.) Ames had a strong interest in the Modernism movement and believed that such houses would become predominant. The Ames house cost $7,500, similar to other McLaughlin houses from 1933 and 1934, which ranged from $3,500 to $7,500 each. Ames and his family lived in the house briefly. The other house is known as the "House at 130 Mohegan Avenue" and was added the National Register of Historic Places in 2009.

The Winslow Ames house rests on a concrete foundation and has a welded steel skeleton. The walls were made of 4 feet (1.2 m) white-painted panels that were constructed of asbestos board over an insulating core. The two-story house is composed of three rectangular modules, offset to create an irregular plan, with a flat roof structure. The largest block in the middle contains the service core with the kitchen and bathroom. The left block contains the main entry, stair hall, and two bedrooms. The right block consists of the one-car garage, and its second story only covers its overlap with the middle block.

== Use ==
The house was ready for occupancy in 1934 and was used by many tenants, but the Ames family sold it to Connecticut College in 1949. The college used it for faculty housing from 1949 to 1987. The original furnace, kitchen cabinets, and plumbing fixtures were replaced over the years, but the core module has retained its purpose. The house fell into a state of disrepair, becoming an "eyesore" by 1989. Connecticut College was concerned with the asbestos in the building and obtained a permit to demolish it, planning to use the land for a boathouse. Today, Connecticut College uses the house for offices and meeting rooms.

== Restoration ==
The Ames house was deemed a "rare survivor" because only one other Motohome was known to exist in White Plains, New York. A woman named Hendrickson gathered supporters from the students and faculty of the college and New London Landmarks to save the house. The demolition was delayed, and the Connecticut Historical Commission gave the college $24,000 in May 1990. The college matched the funds with money that was originally planned for its demolition. The asbestos board panels were covered with non-asbestos panels that mimic the appearance of the original. A new roof was installed, and the windows were replaced with vertical casement windows which were originally used. The interior and exterior of the house were coated with white paint, but the flooring was not returned to the original Masonite rectangles. The restoration project was completed in 1994 and it was listed on the National Register of Historic Places in 1995.

== See also ==
- House at 130 Mohegan Avenue
- National Register of Historic Places listings in New London County, Connecticut
