= St. Mark's Church (Niagara-on-the-Lake) =

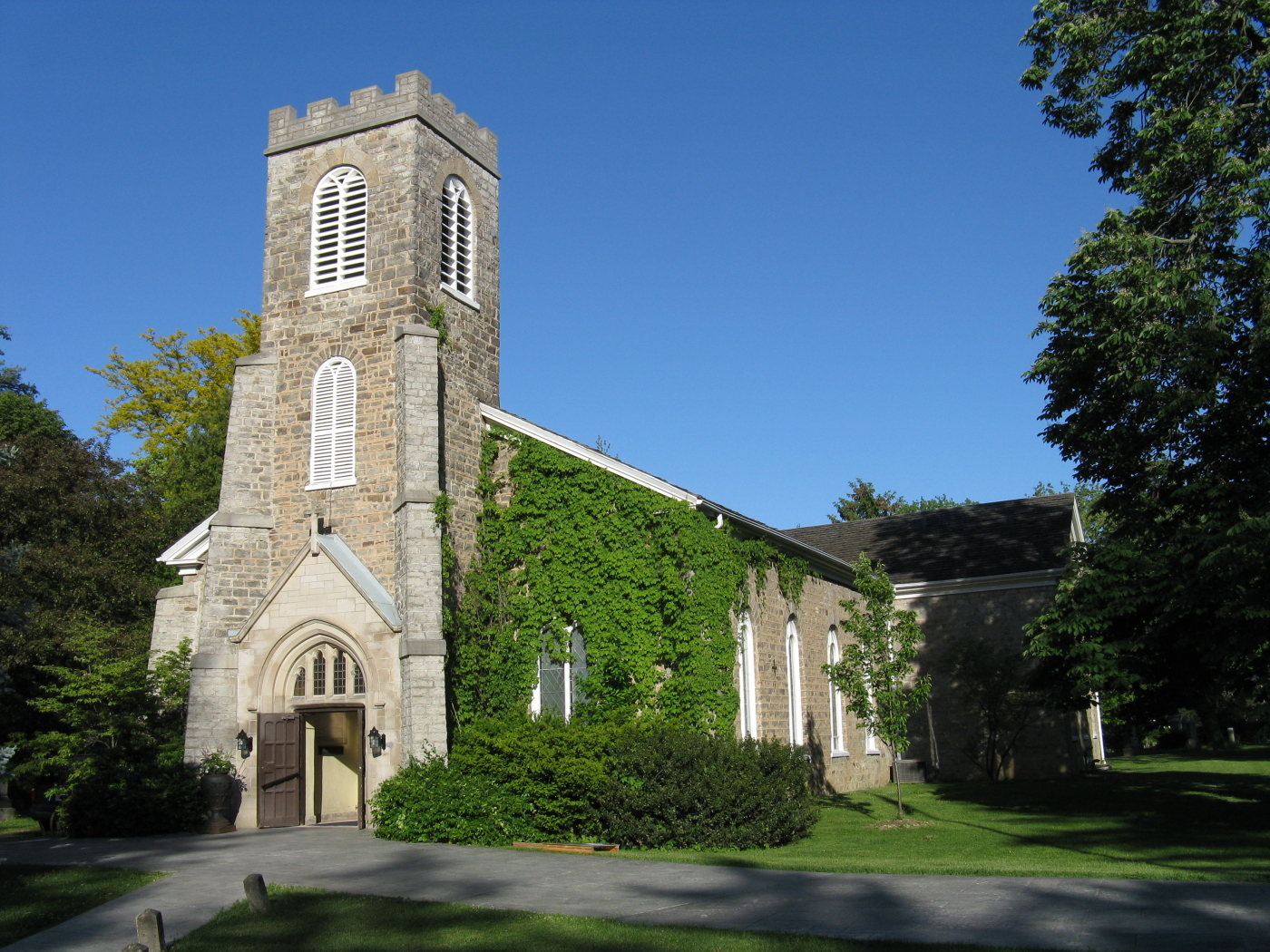
- St. Mark's Church
- 43.2554834°N 79.0692042°W
- Address: 41 Byron Street, Niagara-on-the-Lake, Ontario, Canada
- Denomination: Anglican Church of Canada
- Website: stmarksnotl.org

History
- Founded: 1792
- Consecrated: 1828

Architecture
- Style: Gothic Revival
- Years built: 1809; 1822–1826

Administration
- Province: Ontario
- Diocese: Niagara

Clergy
- Rector: The Rev. Leighton Lee

St. Mark's Church is a historic Anglican church in Niagara-on-the-Lake, Ontario, Canada. It is the oldest church in the Diocese of Niagara and the second oldest Anglican church in Ontario.

== History ==
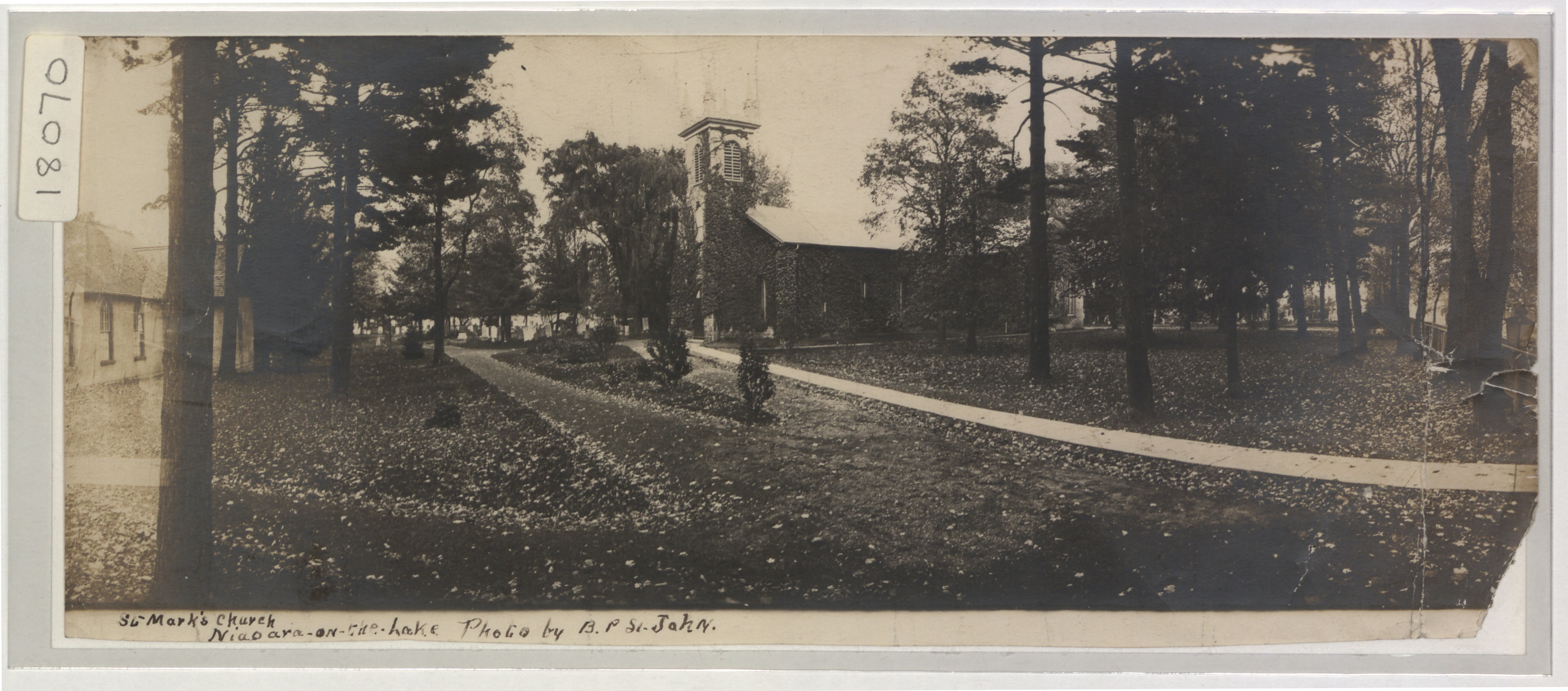
The church in 1907

In 1790, local Anglican residents of what was then Butlersburg wrote to the Rt Rev. Charles Inglis, Bishop of Nova Scotia, requesting a cleric be sent to the area. In 1791, the Rev. Robert Addison was commissioned as a missionary and arrived in Butlersburg in July 1792. At the time, Addison was the only resident Anglican cleric west of Kingston. Early services were held in the Masonic lodge or the court house. A sandstone church was completed in 1809.

During the War of 1812, the church was used as hospital by the British forces and later as a hospital and barracks by the occupying American forces. Addison served as a chaplain to the British Army and presided over the funeral of Major-General Sir Isaac Brock, who had worshipped in the church. On 10 December 1813, the retreating American forces set fire to the village, by then called Newark, including the church. The church was rebuilt from 1822 to 1826 and consecrated in 1828.

In 1838, the transepts and chancel were added. Further alterations came in 1892 and 1964. The earliest stained glass windows date from 1843 and are the oldest west of Quebec.

The parish hall, called Addison Hall, was constructed in 1886. The neighbouring Italianate rectory was erected in 1858 for the church's third rector, the Rev. William McMurray.

== Addison Library ==
The Rev. Robert Addison's collection of 1500 sixteenth and seventeenth century books was left to the church "in perpetuity" by his grandson and now resides in Addison Hall, the parish hall which bears his name. The oldest book was published in 1548.

== Cemetery ==
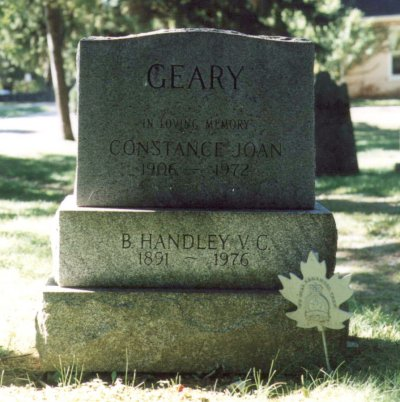
The grave of Major The Rev. Benjamin Handley Geary VC

The cemetery in St. Mark's churchyard is the oldest operational cemetery in Ontario. The land was likely used as burial ground by local Indigenous populations prior to colonization as well. The earliest stone in the cemetery is that of Elizabeth Kerr, daughter of Sir William Johnson, 1st Bt, and Molly Brant, dated 1794. Other notable internments include Major The Rev. Benjamin Handley Geary, a recipient of the Victoria Cross, and the Rev. Robert Addison, the first rector of the church, interred by the north transept of the church and memorialized by a plaque on the church wall.

== See also ==
- Diocese of Niagara
- List of oldest buildings in Canada
