= William McMurray (priest) =

William McMurray was a Canadian Anglican archdeacon in the second half of the 19th century.

McMurray was born in Portadown on 19 September 1810 but emigrated to York, Ontario as a child. He was ordained in 1833 and served at Sault Ste. Marie, Ontario, Ancaster, Dundas and Niagara-on-the-Lake. He was Archdeacon of Diocese of Niagara from 1875 to until his death on 19 May 1894.

Religious titles
Preceded by Thomas Fuller	Archdeacon of Niagara; 1875–1893	Succeeded by Stewart Houston
