= Frank du Moulin (bishop) =

Canadian-born American bishop (1870–1947)

The Right Reverend Frank du Moulin D.D. LL.D.
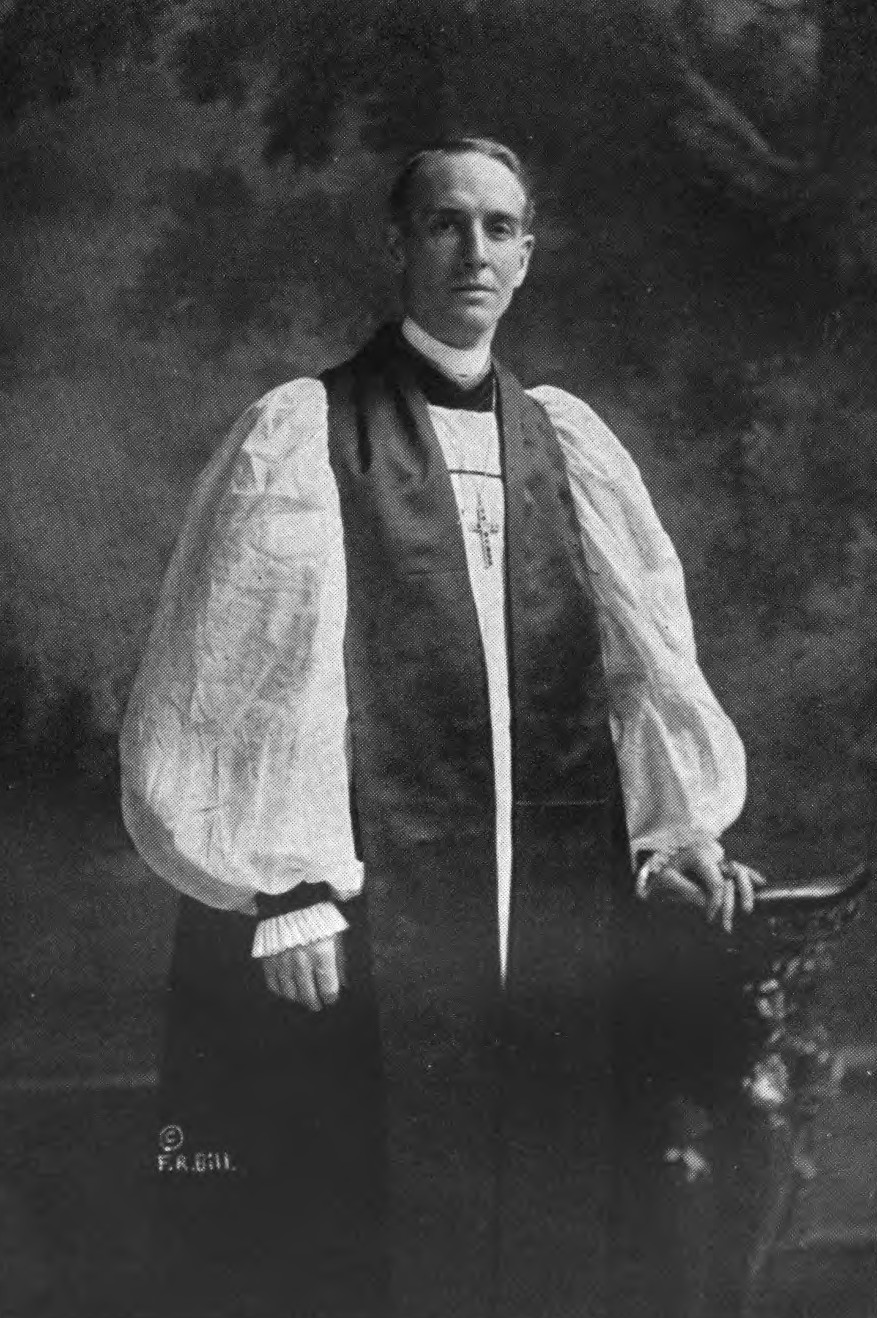
- du Moulin, c. 1915
- Church: Church of England; Protestant Episcopal Church
- Diocese: Ohio

Orders
- Ordination: 1895 (deacon); 1896 (priest) by Philip Du Moulin

Personal details
- Born: July 9, 1870 Montreal, Canada
- Died: July 9, 1947 (aged 77) Philadelphia, Pennsylvania, U.S.
- Parents: Philip du Moulin; Frances Mary Bough
- Spouse: Ethel King (m. 1901; died 1928) Cora Stiles (m. 1929)
- Children: 3, including Rockwell
- Education: Trinity College School; Trinity College, Toronto; St. Francis Xavier University

Frank du Moulin (9 July 1870 – 9 July 1947) was a Canadian-born American clergyman who served as bishop coadjutor of the Diocese of Ohio in The Episcopal Church from 1914 to 1924, having previously served as priest and dean of Trinity Cathedral in Cleveland.

== Biography ==
Frank du Moulin was born on 9 July 1870 in Montreal to Anglican bishop Philip Du Moulin and Frances Mary Bough.

He was educated at Trinity College School and then Trinity College, Toronto, where he received his B.A. and M.A. and then his D.D. in 1915. In 1905, he received an LL.D. from St. Francis Xavier University. He was ordained a deacon in 1895 and a priest the next year at the Church of England, where he served as assistant pastor of the Holy Trinity Church in Toronto.

Du Moulin moved to Chicago in 1896 and worked as a rector of Emmanuel Church in Cleveland the following year. Next, he was appointed to St. Peter's Church in Chicago in 1899 and made dean of the Trinity Cathedral in Cleveland by 1907. While serving as dean, he was elected as the first president of the Federated Churches of Cleveland. He helped organize the Cleveland Federation for Charity and Philanthropy and was appointed delegate of the 1912 Ohio Constitutional Convention by Mayor Newton D. Baker.

Later, he became rector of the Protestant Episcopal Church of the Saviour (now the Philadelphia Episcopal Cathedral) before being elected Bishop Coadjutor of the Diocese of Ohio in 1914. He then retired ten years later in 1924 due to health complications.

He travelled and studied abroad from 1924 to 1925 to Egypt and Asia Minor. By 1930, he moved to Long Island and became a rector of the Protestant Episcopal Church of St. John's of Lattingtown there. He continued his post there until 1943 because of health conditions, when he then moved to Philadelphia.

De Moulin died on 9 July 1947, being survived by his second wife, Cora Stiles, and his three children, including American architect Rockwell King DuMoulin.
