= Benjamin Handley Geary =

Recipient of the Victoria Cross

The Reverend Benjamin Handley Geary
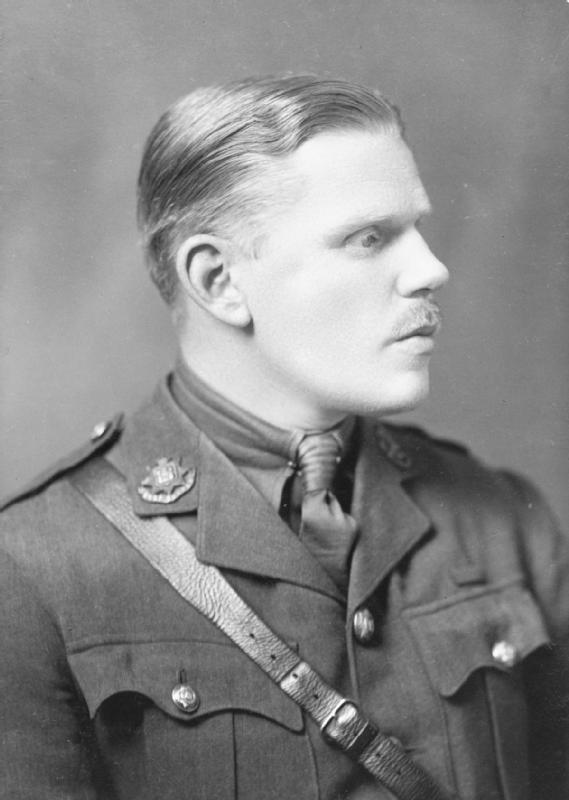
- Born: 29 June 1891; Marylebone, London, England (Note: One source claims that he was born in Surrey.)
- Died: 26 May 1976 (aged 84); Niagara-on-the-Lake, Ontario, Canada
- Burial place: St Mark's Cemetery, Niagara-on-the-Lake
- Military career
- Allegiance: United Kingdom; Canada
- Branch: British Army; Canadian Army
- Service years: 1914–1919 (UK); 1939–? (Canada)
- Rank: Major
- Units: The East Surrey Regiment; Royal Army Chaplains Department
- Conflicts: World War I; World War II
- Awards: Victoria Cross
- Other work: Serjeant-at-Arms to the Ontario Legislature

Major Benjamin Handley Geary VC (29 June 1891 – 26 May 1976) was a British Army recipient of the Victoria Cross, the highest and most prestigious award for gallantry in the face of the enemy that can be awarded to British and other Commonwealth forces.

== Early life ==
Geary was educated at Dulwich College Preparatory School and St Edmund's School, Canterbury, then went up to Keble College, Oxford, in 1910. After graduating he taught at Forest School in Walthamstow (then in Essex, now absorbed into Greater London) 1913–14. On the outbreak of World War I he was commissioned into the Special Reserve on 15 August 1914 as a second lieutenant in the 4th Battalion, East Surrey Regiment. Soon afterwards he was sent to France and attached to the regular 1st Battalion serving on the Western Front.

== VC ==
On 20 and 21 April 1915 the 1st Battalion was in action on Hill 60 near Ypres. Second Lieutenant Geary led his men across exposed open ground swept by fierce enemy fire to join survivors of the Bedfordshire Regiment in a crater at the top of the hill. Geary's subsequent actions earned him the VC. The citation reads:

For most conspicuous bravery and determination on "Hill 60," near Ypres, on April 20th and 21st, 1915, when he held the left crater with his platoon, some men of the Bedfordshire Regiment and a few reinforcements who came up during the evening and night. The crater was first exposed to very heavy artillery fire which broke down the defences, and afterwards throughout the night to repeated bomb attacks which filled it with dead and wounded. Each attack was, however, repulsed mainly owing to the splendid personal gallantry and example of Second Lieutenant Geary. At one time he used a rifle with great effect, at another threw hand grenades, and exposed himself with entire disregard to danger in order to see by the light of flares where the enemy were coming on. In the intervals between the attacks he spent his whole time arranging for the ammunition supply and for reinforcements. He was severely wounded just before daylight on 21st April.

== Later life ==
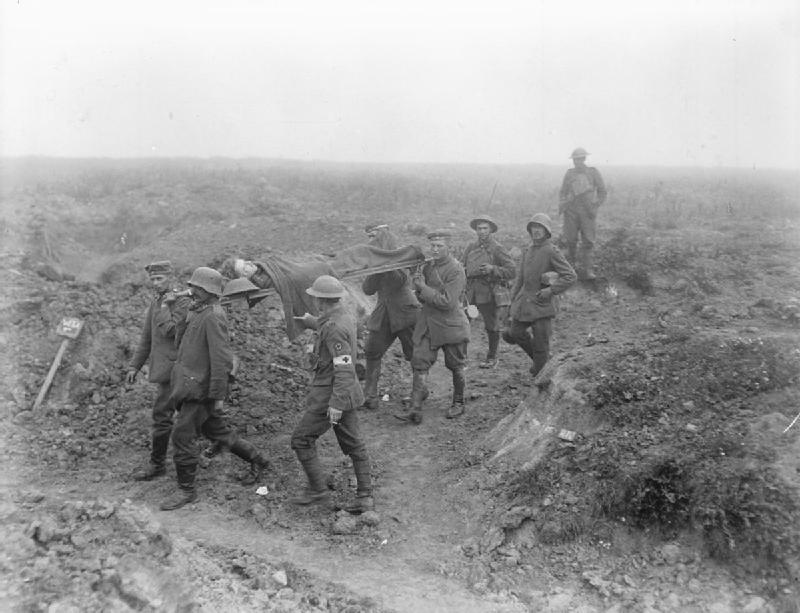
Captain Geary VC, 1st Battalion, East Surrey Regiment being carried in on a stretcher by prisoner bearers at Achiet-le-Petit, 23 August 1918.

Geary was evacuated to England having been shot in the head and lost the sight in his left eye; his right eye was also seriously impaired. He was promoted to lieutenant, worked on ground duties with the Royal Flying Corps, returned to France (still with the RFC) in 1916 and was appointed acting captain. In January 1918 he rejoined the 1st Battalion East Surrey Regiment in Italy, still as acting captain, and commanded a company although medically he should not have returned to active duty. Later that year he returned to France and was wounded again. He retired from Army in 1919 with the rank of captain.

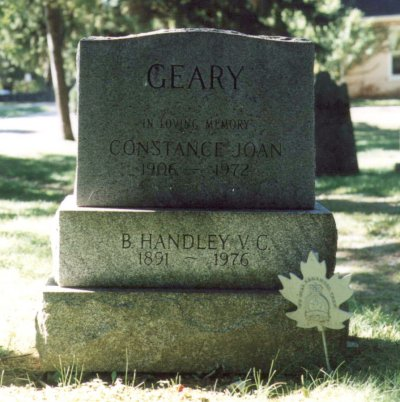
Benjamin Geary's headstone in Niagara-on-the-Lake, Ontario

Geary took Holy Orders in the Church of England, having studied at Wycliffe Hall, Oxford, and after other Church posts served as Chaplain to the Forces 1926–27. He then resigned and emigrated to Canada. During World War II he served with the Canadian Army and achieved the rank of Major. After the war he was Sergeant-at-Arms of the Ontario Legislature 1947–71, then retired but was for a time historian for the Legislature. His grave and memorial are at St Mark's Church Cemetery, Niagara-on-the-Lake, Ontario.

== The medal ==
Geary's Victoria Cross and other medals are displayed at the Canadian War Museum in Ottawa, Ontario, Canada.

== Bibliography ==
- Monuments to Courage (David Harvey, 1999)
- The Register of the Victoria Cross (This England, 1997)
- Batchelor, Peter; Matson, Christopher (2011). The Western Front 1915. VCs of the First World War. Stroud, Gloucestershire: The History Press. ISBN 978-0-7524-6057-4.
