= Diocese of Niagara =

Diocese of the Anglican Church in Canada

Coordinates: 43°15′47″N 79°51′58″W

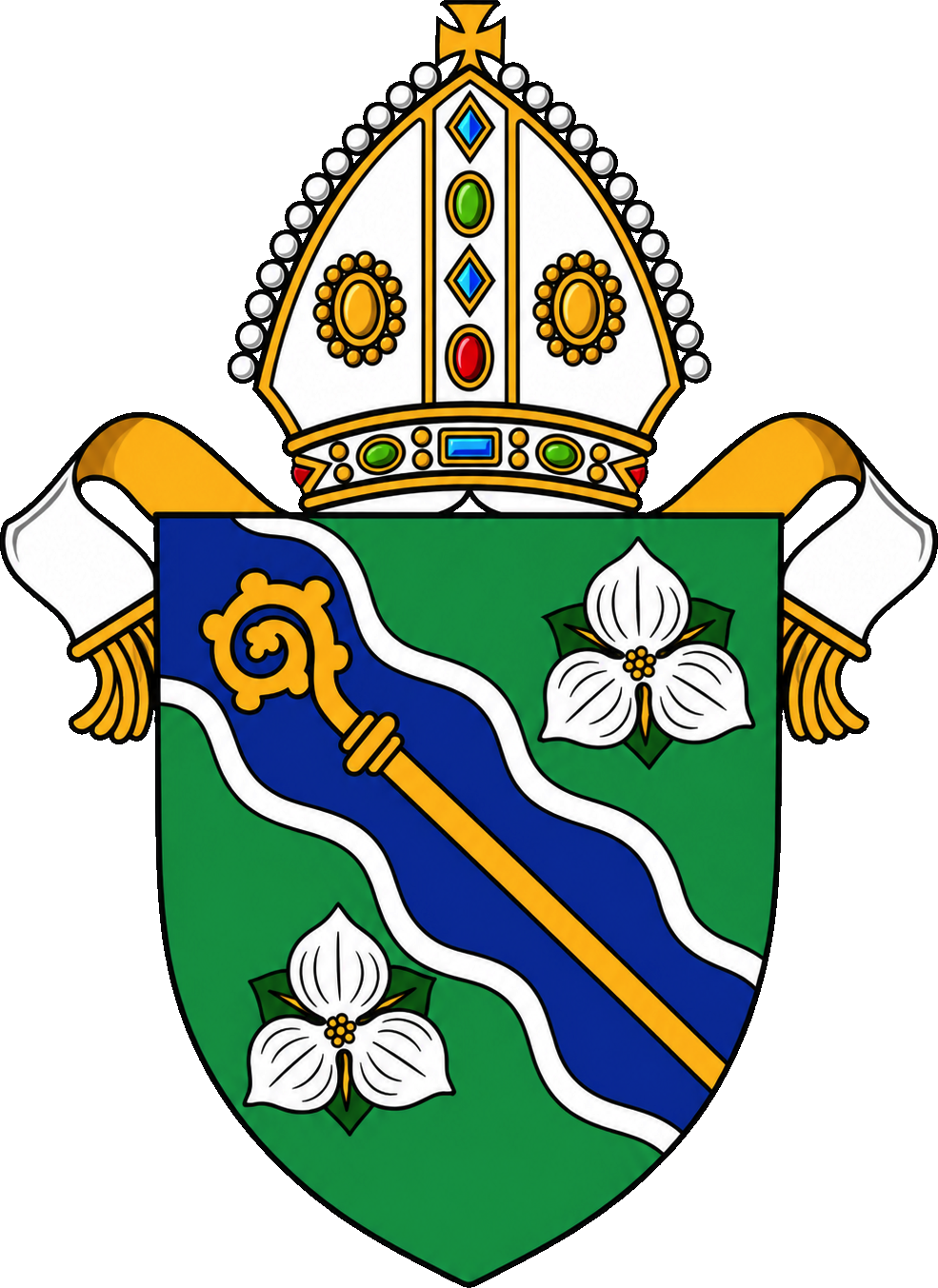

Location
- Country: Canada
- Ecclesiastical province: Ontario
- Archdeaconries: 5
- Headquarters: Cathedral Place, Hamilton

Statistics
- Parishes: 79 (2024)
- Members: 13,745 (2024)

Information
- Denomination: Anglican Church of Canada
- Rite: Anglican
- Established: 1875
- Cathedral: Christ's Church Cathedral, Hamilton

Current leadership
- Bishop: Susan Bell

Map
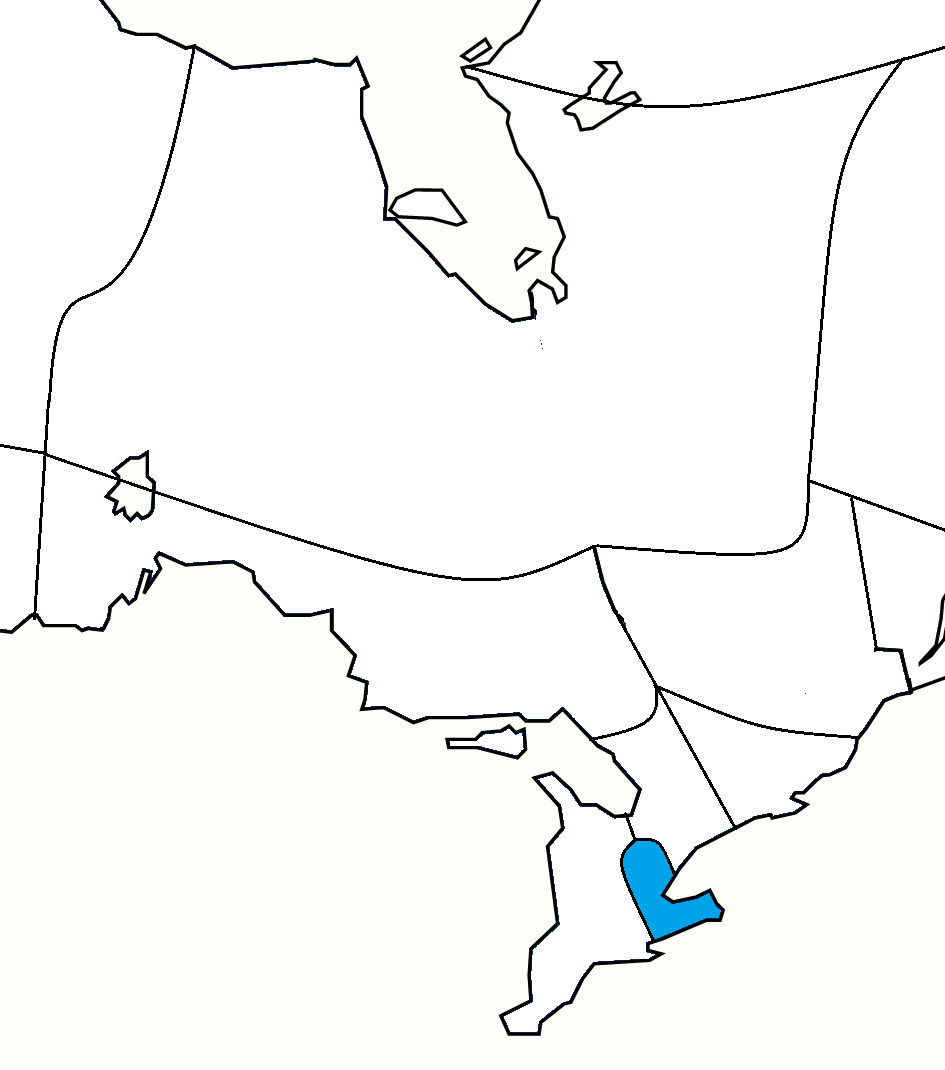
- The boundaries of the diocese within the Ecclesiastical Province of Ontario.

Website
- niagaraanglican.ca

The Diocese of Niagara is one of thirty regional divisions in the Anglican Church of Canada. The see city of the diocese is Hamilton, with the bishop's cathedra located at Christ's Church Cathedral on James Street North. Located within the ecclesiastical province of Ontario, it borders the Dioceses of Huron and Toronto. The area enclosed by the Diocese of Niagara includes much of the Golden Horseshoe, and moves north to include Erin and Orangeville as far as Shelburne. Moving sharply south, the boundary includes Mount Forest and widens, south-westerly to include Elora and Guelph. Skirting Brantford and the Territory of the Six Nations Confederacy, the line then travels, again, south-westerly to Jarvis and Lake Erie to include the entire Niagara Peninsula. Major urban centres within its borders are St. Catharines, Niagara Falls, Hamilton, Guelph, Oakville, Milton, Burlington, and Orangeville.

The current bishop of Niagara is Susan Bell, who succeeded Michael Bird as diocesan bishop on June 1, 2018. She was elected bishop by the synod of the Diocese of Niagara in March 2018, and consecrated and installed as bishop in May of that year.

There are just over 80 parishes within the diocese served by approximately 120 licensed parish priests, with a number of honorary clergy, vocational deacons and licensed lay readers. The diocese is divided into five regional deaneries: Brock, Lincoln, Hamilton-Haldimand, Greater Wellington and Trafalgar. Each deanery is overseen by a regional archdeacon and regional dean.

== Early history ==
The first Anglican presence in what would become the Diocese of Niagara begin with St Mark's Church in Newark (now Niagara-on-the-Lake), the former capital of Upper Canada. The parish was founded in 1790 as Loyalist immigrants arrived from the former American colonies, in what would become the province of Ontario. At this time the area was part of the Diocese of Nova Scotia, and subsequently became part of the Diocese of Quebec, then of the Diocese of Toronto.

The diocese was formed by an act of the Legislative Assembly of Upper Canada; 39 Vic Chapter 107 in 1875. Royal assent was given in 1876. The first bishop was Thomas Brock Fuller, Archdeacon of Niagara and godson of Sir Isaac Brock, the hero of the Battle of Queenston Heights.

== Parishes by region ==
=== Region of Greater Wellington ===
- St. Alban the Martyr, Acton
- Grace Church, Arthur
- St. John, Elora
- All Saints, Erin
- St. James, Fergus
- All Saints Lutheran Anglican Church, Guelph
- Church of the Apostles (St. James & St. Matthias), Guelph
- St. George, Guelph
- St. Paul, Mount Forest
- St. Mark, Orangeville
- St. John, Rockwood
- St. Paul, Shelburne

=== Region of Trafalgar ===
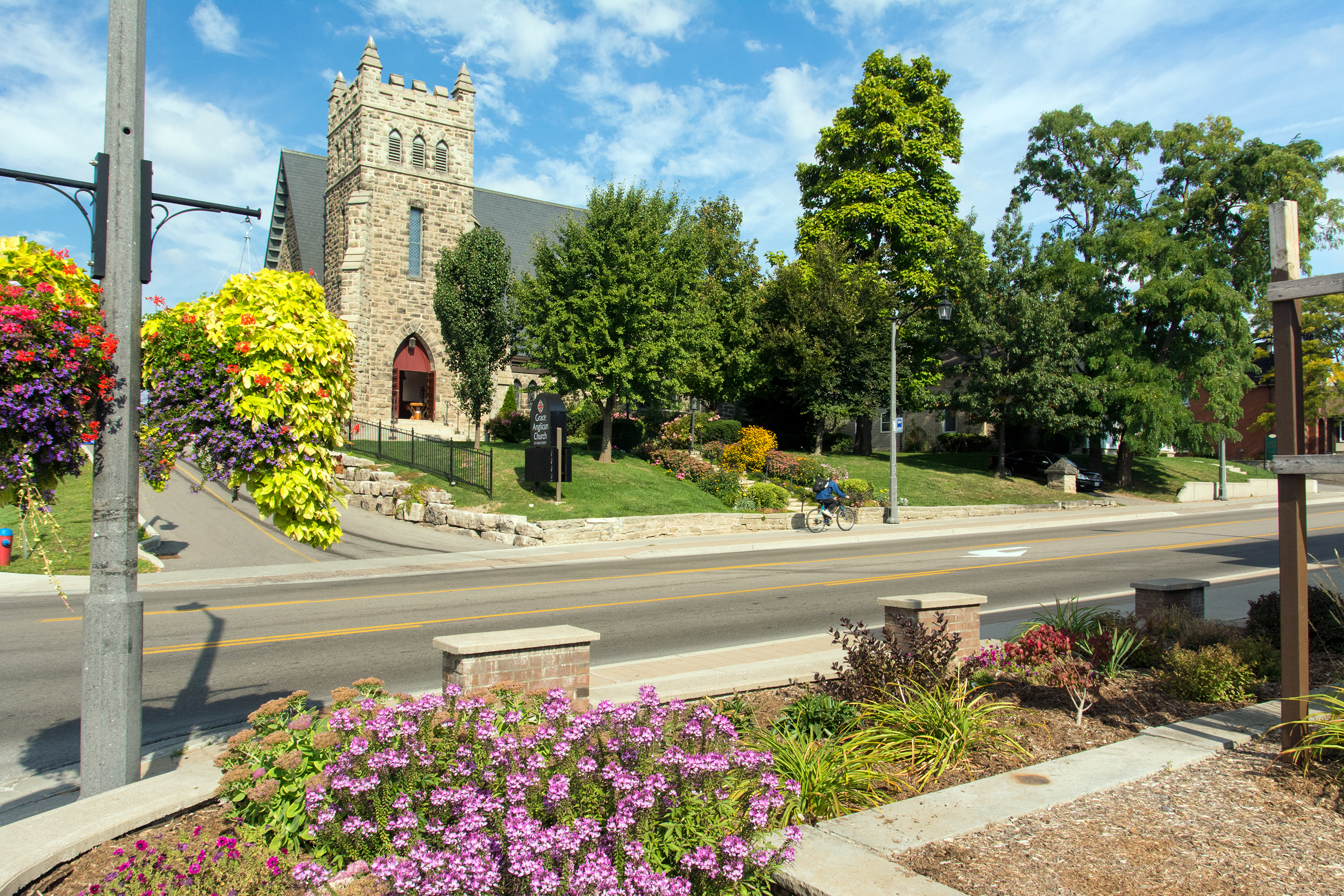
Grace Anglican Church, Milton, Ontario

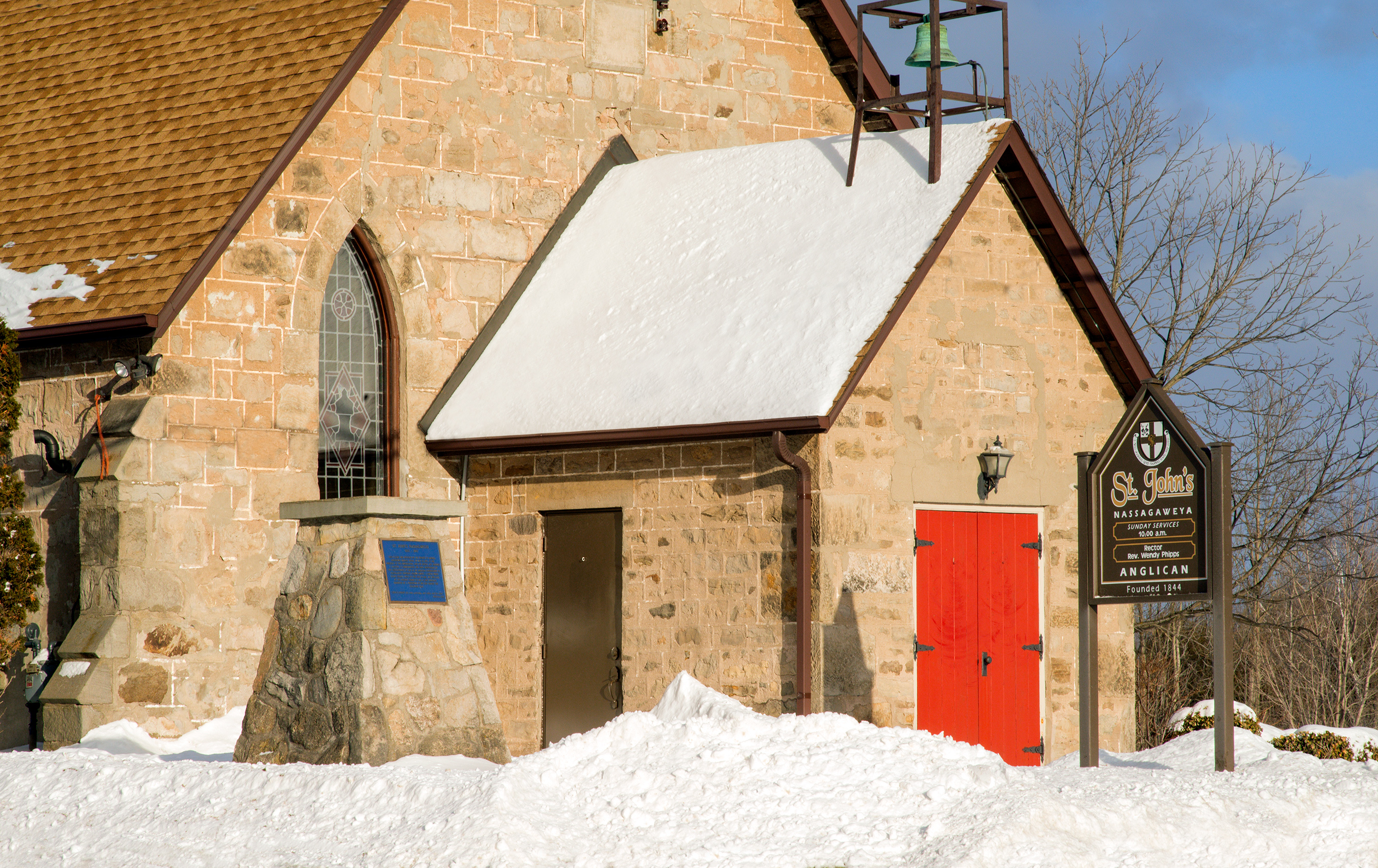
St. John Anglican Church, Campbellville, Ontario

- St. Christopher, Burlington
- St. Elizabeth, Burlington
- St. John, Burlington
- St. Luke, Burlington
- St. Matthew on-the-Plains, Burlington
- St. George's, Georgetown
- St. Alban the Martyr, Glen Williams
- St. Stephen, Hornby
- St. George Church Lowville, Campbellville
- Grace, Milton
- St. John, Campbellville (Nassagaweya)
- St. Paul, Norval
- The Church of the Epiphany, Oakville
- Church of the Incarnation, Oakville
- St. Aidan, Oakville
- St. Cuthbert, Oakville
- St. Jude, Oakville
- St. Simon, Oakville
- St. Luke, Oakville
- St. John, Stewarttown
- Grace, Waterdown

=== Region of Hamilton-Haldimand ===
- St. John, Ancaster
- St. Paul, Caledonia
- St. John the Divine, Cayuga
- St. John, Cheapside
- St. James, Dundas
- St. Paul, Dunnville
- The Dunn Parish: Christ Church & St John the Evangelist, Dunnville
- Christ Church, Flamborough
- All Saints, Hamilton
- Christ's Church Cathedral, Hamilton
- Church of the Nativity, Hamilton
- Church of the Resurrection, Hamilton
- St. John the Evangelist, Hamilton
- St. Michael, Hamilton
- St. Paul (Westdale), Hamilton
- St. Stephen on the Mount, Hamilton
- St. Paul, Jarvis
- The Church of the Ascension, Hamilton
- St. Paul (Glanford), Mount Hope
- The Church of Our Saviour The Redeemer, Stoney Creek
- St. John the Evangelist, Winona
- Christ Church, Woodburn (Hannon)

=== Region of Lincoln ===
- St. Alban, Beamsville
- St. Andrew, Grimsby
- St. John, Jordan
- Christ Church, McNab
- St. Mark's, Niagara-on-the-Lake
- St. Saviour, The Brock Memorial Church, Queenston
- St. Luke, Smithville
- St. Barnabas, St. Catharines
- St. Columba, St. Catharines
- St. George, St. Catharines
- St. John, (Port Dalhousie) St. Catharines
- St. Thomas, St. Catharines
- Transfiguration, St. Catharines
- St. John the Evangelist, Thorold

=== Region of Brock ===
- Holy Trinity, Fonthill
- St. Paul, Fort Erie
- Christ Church, Niagara Falls
- Holy Trinity (Chippawa), Niagara Falls
- St. John the Evangelist, Niagara Falls
- The Parish of St. James and St. Brendan, Port Colborne
- St. John, Ridgemount
- All Saints, Ridgeway
- Christ Church, Wainfleet
- All Saints Church (Dain City), Welland
- Holy Trinity, Welland
- St. David, Welland

== Educational institutions ==
- Appleby College, Oakville, founded 1911.
- St. Mildred's-Lightbourn School, Oakville, founded as St. Mildred's College, Toronto, 1908.
- Ridley College, St. Catharines, founded 1889.
- St. John's-Kilmarnock School, Breslau, founded 1972

The diocese also has connections to campus ministries at three universities in its jurisdiction. The University of Guelph, Brock University and McMaster University all have chaplains whose ministries are affiliated with the Diocese of Niagara and its ecumenical partners.

== Diocesan bishops of Niagara ==
1. Thomas Fuller, 1875–1884
2. Charles Hamilton, 1884–1896
3. Philip Du Moulin, 1896–1911
4. William Clark, 1911–1925
5. Derwyn Owen, 1925–1932 6th Primate of All Canada, 1934–1947
6. Lewis Broughall, 1932–1949
7. Walter Bagnall, 1949-1973
8. John Bothwell, 1973–1991 Archbishop of Niagara and 13th Metropolitan of Ontario, 1985–1991
9. Walter Asbil, 1991–1997
10. Ralph Spence, 1998–2008
11. Michael Bird, 2008–2018
12. Susan Bell, 2018–present

== Litigation ==
The diocese was involved with litigation against several former parishes affiliated with Anglican Network in Canada. The courts have generally upheld the diocese as owner of the church buildings and ejected the illegally assumed leadership.
