= Howard T. Fisher =

American architect

Howard Taylor Fisher A.I.A.
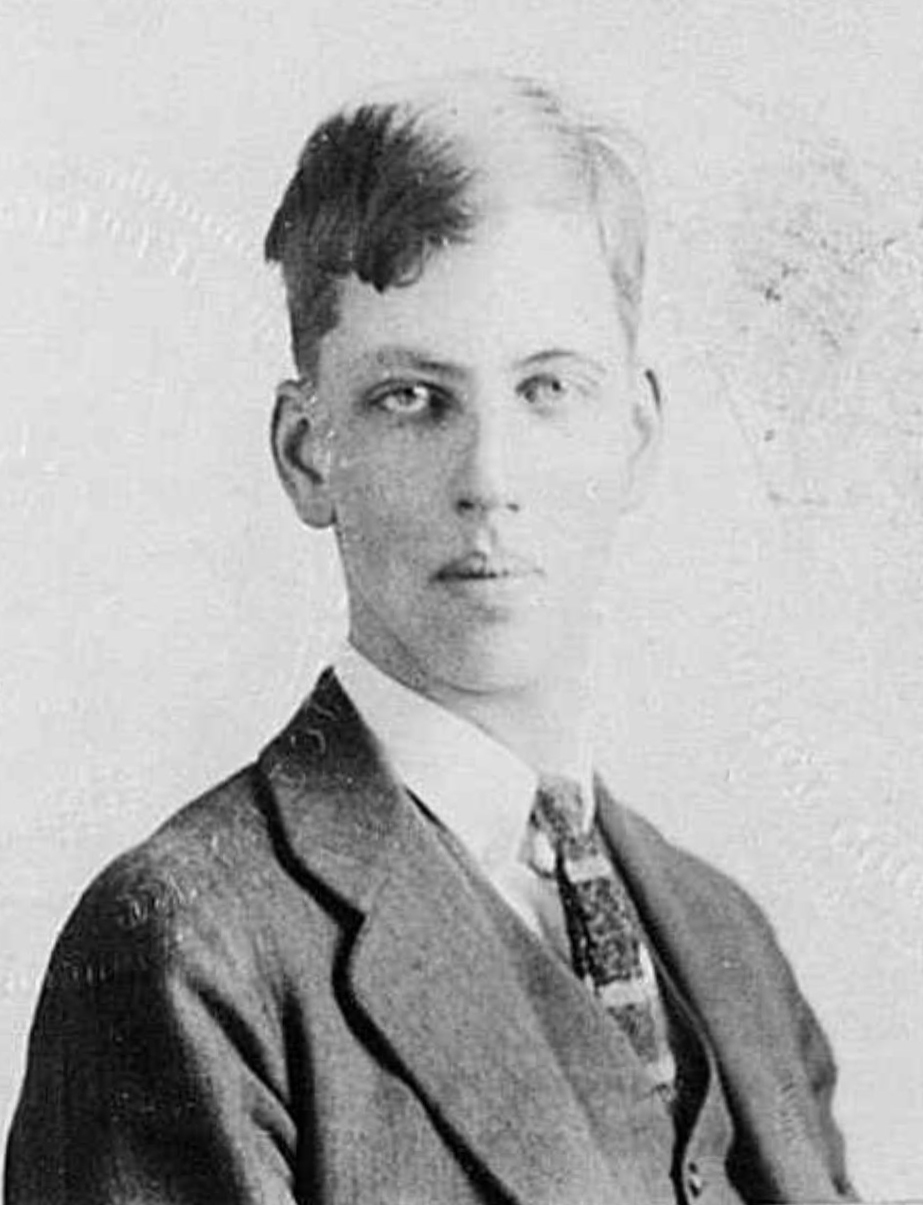
- Born: October 30, 1903; Chicago, Illinois
- Died: January 24, 1979 (aged 75); Exeter, New Hampshire
- Education: Harvard University (BS)
- Parent: Walter Lowrie Fisher

Howard T. Fisher A.I.A. (October 30, 1903 – January 24, 1979) was an American architect, city planner, and educator.

== Early life ==
Howard Taylor Fisher was born October 30, 1903, in Chicago, Illinois. His parents were Walter Lowrie Fisher and Mabel Taylor. He graduated from Harvard College with a Bachelor of Science, magna cum laude, in 1926. He attended the School of Architecture, Harvard University, from 1926 to 1928.

== Work in architecture ==
Fisher started his career as an architect in 1931 with a solo practice in Chicago, which continued until 1943.

In 1932, he founded General Houses, Inc. in Chicago to design, sell, and erect low-cost prefabricated housing. The company's system included eight types of prefabricated steel-framed modular panels: solid, small window, large window, glass, entrance door, kitchen door, double doors, and a fireplace. Panels were typically four-feet wide by nine-feet high - except the fireplace panel was taller, and the garage door panel was twice as wide. The panels could be assembled in a wide variety of configurations to suit individual clients' needs and specific sites. For example, one General Houses house that was built on a hillside had three stories with the living room on the top floor to best enjoy the view. The General Houses, Inc. building system was the subject of U.S. patent 1,969,125 issued August 7, 1934.

A marketing slogan of the company was "A house that's twice as good at half the price." General Houses cost about $3,000 to $4,500.

During the Century of Progress, Fisher had two prefabricated houses on display. The first was part of "The Work of the Young Architects of the Midwest" exhibit, which also featured the work of Fisher's rival, Robert W. McLaughlin Jr. Another house, built for Ruth Page was described as an interesting, albeit gloomy, house with an awkward spatial layout.

General Houses, Inc.'s first house was erected in 1933 in Winnetka, Illinois, but no longer stands. The House at 130 Mohegan Avenue, completed in November 1933 for about $4,500, is a surviving example of a General Houses house. It is a single-story prefabricated home measuring 21 feet (6.4 m) by 37 feet (11 m) on a concrete slab. Another house, the House of Steel, was built for client Winslow Ames and still survives on the campus of Connecticut College. General Houses, Inc., wound up its business in 1947.

In 1943, Fisher established Howard T. Fisher & Associates in Chicago to practice architecture and city planning. The firm wound up its business in 1965.

He became a Member of the American Institute of Architects (AIA) in 1949 and remained a Member until his death. In 1966, he became an Emeritus Member. He was made a member of the College of Fellows of the AIA in 1974.

== Work as an educator ==
In 1965 Fisher founded the Harvard Laboratory for Computer Graphics and Spatial Analysis at the Graduate School of Design, serving as its director until 1968. From 1966 to 1970 he was a professor of city planning, and a research professor in cartography from 1970 until his retirement in 1975.

== Howard T. Fisher Prize ==
In 1999, The Harvard Center for Geographic Analysis launched the Howard T. Fisher Prize in Geographic Information Systems. It is given annually to both undergraduate and graduate students at Harvard University. The prize is co administered by the Center for Geographic Analysis (CGA) and the Harvard Graduate School of Design (GSD), funded by a gift from Jack Dangermond (MLA 1969), President of Environmental Systems Research Institute.

== Personal ==
Fisher married Marion Hall on February 11, 1939. They had three children: Ann Bourne Fisher (deceased), Morgan Hall Fisher, and Alan Hall Fisher.

He died January 24, 1979, in Exeter, New Hampshire.
