= Michael Bird (bishop) =

Canadian Anglican bishop

The Right Reverend Michael Bird
- Bishop of Niagara
- Church: Anglican Church of Canada
- Province: Province of Ontario
- Diocese: Diocese of Niagara
- See: Hamilton
- In office: 2008 to 2018
- Predecessor: Ralph Spence
- Successor: Susan Bell

Orders
- Ordination: 1984
- Consecration: 2007

Personal details
- Born: 15 November 1957 (age 68) Oakville, Ontario, Canada
- Denomination: Anglicanism
- Education: University of Toronto

The Right Reverend Michael Bird (born 15 November 1957) is a retired Canadian Anglican bishop. From 2008 until 2018 he was the Bishop of Niagara in the Anglican Church of Canada.

Bird was born in Oakville, Ontario on 15 November 1957 and educated at the University of Toronto, he was ordained in 1984. He has held incumbencies at Burin, Newfoundland; St Paul's, Dunnville; St Cuthbert's, Oakville; and St Luke's, Burlington. He became coadjutor bishop of Niagara in 2007 and its diocesan a year later.

During his decade-long episcopacy, Bird led the diocese of Niagara in developing a new vision for ministry, advocated for equal marriage, and welcomed hundreds of Syrian refugees sponsorsed by parishes as part of the diocese's 140th anniversary celebrations.

On 12 September 2017, he announced that he would step down on 1 June 2018. An electoral synod to choose his successor was held Saturday, 3 March 2018.

Anglican Communion titles
Preceded by David Ralph Spence	Bishop of Niagara; 2008 to 2018	Succeeded by Susan Bell
