= Walter Asbil =

Canadian Anglican bishop (1932–2023)

The Right Reverend Walter Asbil
- Bishop of Niagara
- Church: Anglican Church of Canada
- Diocese: Niagara
- Elected: 1991
- In office: 1991–1997
- Predecessor: John Bothwell
- Successor: Ralph Spence

Orders
- Ordination: 1957

Personal details
- Born: Walter Gordon Asbil; October 3, 1932
- Died: April 8, 2023 (aged 90)
- Education: Sir George Williams University (BA); McGill University (BDiv); Montreal Diocesan Theological College (Licentiate of Theology)

Walter Gordon Asbil (October 3, 1932 – April 8, 2023) was a Canadian Anglican bishop.

== Early life and education ==
Asbil was born on October 3, 1932. He received a Bachelor of Arts from Sir George Williams University in 1954, then a bachelor of divinity from McGill University as well as a licentiate of theology from the Montreal Diocesan Theological College in 1957.

== Career ==
Ordained in 1957, his first ministry position was at Aylwin River Desert. He held incumbencies at South Shore, Montreal, St Stephen's Montreal, St George's Sainte-Anne-de-Bellevue, Quebec, and St George's in St Catharines, Ontario.

From 1986 to 1990, he was Dean of Christ Church Cathedral in Ottawa, after which he became coadjutor bishop of the Anglican Diocese of Niagara and then its diocesan bishop in 1991. He retired in 1997.

== Personal life and death ==
Asbil's son, Andrew Asbil, became the Dean of Toronto in 2016. On June 9, 2018, it was announced that Andrew Asbil was elected as Coadjutor Bishop of Toronto and would become the 12th Bishop of Toronto after the retirement of Archbishop Colin Johnson at the end of 2018.

Asbil died on April 8, 2023, at the age of 90.

== References and notes ==
Anglican Communion titles
| Preceded by John Charles Bothwell | Bishop of Niagara; 1991–1997 | Succeeded by David Ralph Spence |
