= Azel Ames =

American politician

- Born: Azel Ames Jr. August 16, 1845; Chelsea, Massachusetts, United States
- Died: November 12, 1908 (aged 63); Danvers State Hospital, Danvers, Massachusetts, United States
- Burial place: Woodlawn Cemetery, Everett, Massachusetts, United States
- Children: 3, including Louise Ames Norman
- Relatives: Winslow Ames (grandson)
- Education: Harvard Medical School
- Medical career
- Profession: Physician; author; sanitary engineer; genealogist; politician
- Field: Physician; surgeon

Azel Ames Jr. (1845–1908) was an American physician, author, sanitation engineer, genealogist, and politician.

== Early life and education ==
Ames was born on August 16, 1845 in Chelsea, Massachusetts to Azel Ames and Louisa Ames, née Lufkin. Ames was educated at Phillips Andover Academy.

During the Civil War Ames served for the Union.

In 1871, Ames graduated from Harvard Medical School.

== Career ==
Ames was a practicing physician before devoting himself to public sanitation efforts, where he was engaged to draw up the health and sanitary regulations for many large cities. He was a member of the Massachusetts State Drainage Commission and was twice sent as a representative of the United States Government to international sanitary conferences. He was a longtime resident of Wakefield, Massachusetts, where he founded the water company and Board of Health. In 1879 he was elected representative in the Massachusetts State Legislature and was secretary of the Committee on Public Health. In 1898–99 he was acting-assistant surgeon the United States army during the Spanish–American War; and in 1899 was major and brigadier surgeon in the United States volunteers. His books include The Mayflower and Its Log, Sex in Industry; Elementary Hygiene for the Tropics, and The Family of John Philips.

== Personal life and death ==
In 1866, Ames married Sarah Deering Thomas Ames, daughter of Sarah and Elijah Ames. The couple had three children Colonel Azell Ames Jr., an electrical engineer and former Army officer, Edward Winslow, a diplomat and Louise Kimball Ames, a designer. Through Edward Ames' grandson was Winslow Ames, an art historian, author, and museum director.

Ames spent the last several years of his life as a patient at Danvers State Hospital, where he died in 1908, aged 63.
