= Deshon-Allyn House =

Historic house in Connecticut

- U.S. National Register of Historic Places
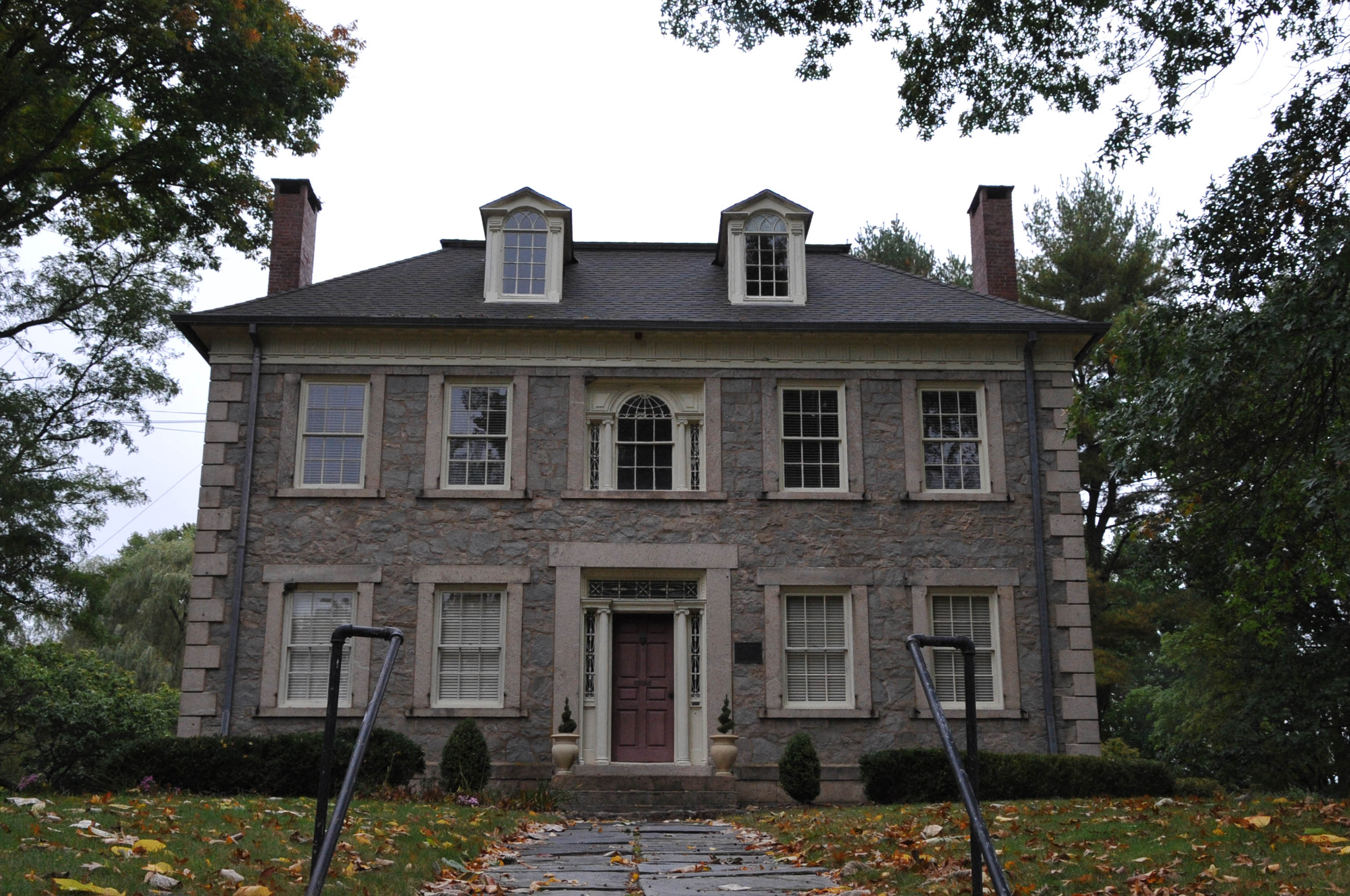

- Location within Connecticut Location within the United States
- Location: 613 Williams Street, New London, Connecticut
- Coordinates: 41°22′21″N 72°6′19″W
- Area: 3 acres (1.2 ha)
- Built: 1829
- Architectural style: Greek Revival, Federal
- NRHP reference No.: 70000700
- Added to NRHP: October 28, 1970

The Deshon-Allyn House is a historic house at 613 Williams Street in New London, Connecticut, built in 1829 for the captain of a whaling ship. It is a fine example of transitional Federal-Greek Revival architecture. The house is now on the campus of the Lyman Allyn Art Museum, which has used it for a variety of purposes. It was listed on the National Register of Historic Places on October 28, 1970.

== Description and history ==
The Deshon-Allyn House is located on the campus of the Lyman Allyn Art Museum on the east side of Williams Street, north of downtown New London. It is a large 2½-story structure built out of random-laid stone, with corner quoins and openings framed by ashlar granite. It is covered by a truncated hipped roof with gabled dormers, and four brick chimneys projecting from its roof faces. The recessed entry is flanked inside the opening by Ionic columns and sidelights, with a transom window across the top. Above the entrance is a small Palladian window, its elements separated by pilasters. Many of its surviving interior features are identifiable in the publications of Asher Benjamin.

The house was built in 1829 for Captain Daniel Deshon, the master of a local whaling vessel, and is a particularly elegant example of late Federal architecture. It was purchased in 1851 by Lyman Allyn, also a whaling captain who greatly enlarged his fortune by investing in railroads and other businesses. The museum that now owns the house was established in his memory by his daughter.

Robert Ballard's Ocean Exploration Trust (founded 2008) established offices within the Deshon-Allyn House.

== See also ==
- National Register of Historic Places listings in New London County, Connecticut
