= Susan Bell (bishop) =

Canadian Anglican bishop

Susan Jennifer Anne Bell (born 1966) is a Canadian Anglican bishop. Since 2018, she has served as 12th Bishop of Niagara in the Anglican Church of Canada.

== Life and career ==
Bell was born in Hamilton, Ontario, and she was educated at McMaster University and the University of Toronto. She was the chaplain at Wycliffe College, Toronto (from 1997 to 1999), and on the staff of St. Martin-in-the-Fields, Toronto (from 1997 to 2018). She was also Canon Missioner for the Diocese of Toronto from 2013 until her election by the synod of the Diocese of Niagara to the episcopate in 2018.

In 2019, Bell received the degree of Doctor of Divinity (jures dignitatus) from Wycliffe College, in the University of Toronto. In 2022, Bell received another Doctor of Divinity (honoris causa) from Trinity College in the University of Toronto. This honorary degree was granted in recognition of Bell’s "distinguished pastoral leadership as the 12th Bishop of Niagara, and in recognition of her innovative thinking and future-oriented work in promoting mission and congregational development, and in re-visioning congregational identity, in the Anglican Church of Canada."

Bell is also the co-author of a small group workbook entitled, Christian Foundations.

Anglican Communion titles
Preceded by Michael Bird	Bishop of Niagara; 2018–present	Incumbent
