= William Clark (bishop) =

Canadian Anglican bishop

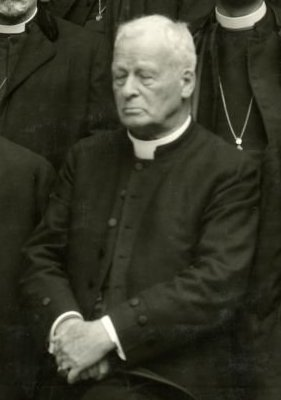
The Right Reverend William Clark in 1924

William Reid Clark was a Canadian Anglican bishop in the first decades of the 20th century.

He was educated at Trinity College, Toronto and ordained in 1876. He was curate of St Luke's Burlington and then held incumbencies in Barton Township, Ontario and Ancaster, Ontario before becoming the Archdeacon of Niagara in 1902 and its fourth diocesan bishop in 1911. He died in post in April 1925.

Anglican Communion titles
Preceded by John Philip Du Moulin	Bishop of Niagara; 1911 –1925	Succeeded by Derwyn Trevor Owen
