= Trinity Cathedral (Cleveland) =

Historic church in Ohio, United States

- U.S. National Register of Historic Places
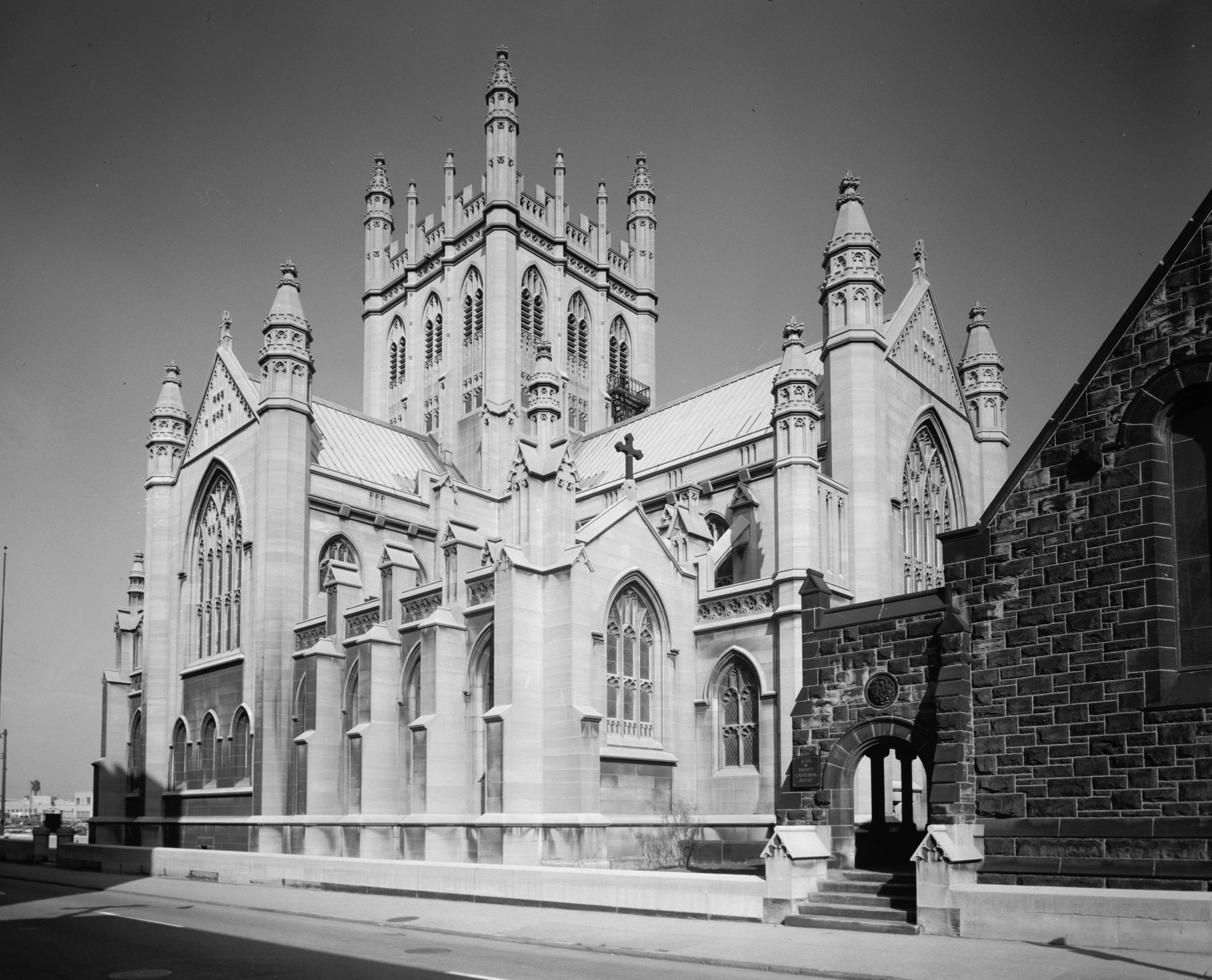
- Side of the cathedral

- Location within Cleveland Location within Ohio Location within the United States
- Location: Euclid Ave. at E. 22nd St., Cleveland, Ohio
- Coordinates: 41°30′4″N 81°40′28″W
- Area: 1 acre (0.40 ha)
- Built: 1901
- Architect: Schweinfurth, Charles
- Architectural style: English Gothic
- NRHP reference No.: 73001420
- Added to NRHP: June 04, 1973

Trinity Cathedral is a historic church on Euclid Avenue at East 22nd Street in Cleveland, Ohio. It is the cathedral of the Episcopal Diocese of Ohio.

In 2017, the cathedral reported 1,076 members; in 2023, it reported 309 members. Plate and pledge financial support reported by the church in 2025 was $471,052. Average Sunday Attendance (ASA) reported in 2025 was 182 persons. This was a relative decrease on ASA of 388 in 2016.

Building was begun in 1901 and added to the National Register of Historic Places in 1973.

== History ==
Trinity parish was founded on November 9, 1816, in the home of Phineas Shepherd. As the parish grew, a new wood-frame church was erected on the corner of St. Clair Avenue and Seneca Street (now West 3rd Street) and was consecrated in 1829. This was the first church building built within the village limits of Cleveland.

In 1846, to meet the needs of a growing parish, plans for a larger, centralized building just east of Public Square commenced. The congregation moved into the larger stone structure in the Gothic style on Superior Avenue in 1855. In 1890, Trinity Church was offered to Bishop William A. Leonard for use as a cathedral for the Diocese of Ohio. The congregation would maintain the building and it would serve dual roles as the parish church and cathedral for the diocese. Shortly thereafter plans were developed to build a new cathedral in its present location.

Charles F. Schweinfurth was selected as the architect for the new cathedral and had originally planned a Romanesque building. Bishop Leonard and the congregation strongly objected preferring a Gothic structure that was more befitting to Anglican traditions. Construction began on the cathedral in 1901 and it was officially consecrated on September 24, 1907.

In 2002, Trinity Commons was completed which provided additional program and office space for the cathedral and diocese. Central to the Trinity Commons is a central piazza used for informal gatherings after services and serves as the entry space for the cathedral. In addition to meeting and office space, the Commons hosts an art gallery, coffee shop, and restaurant.

== Deans ==
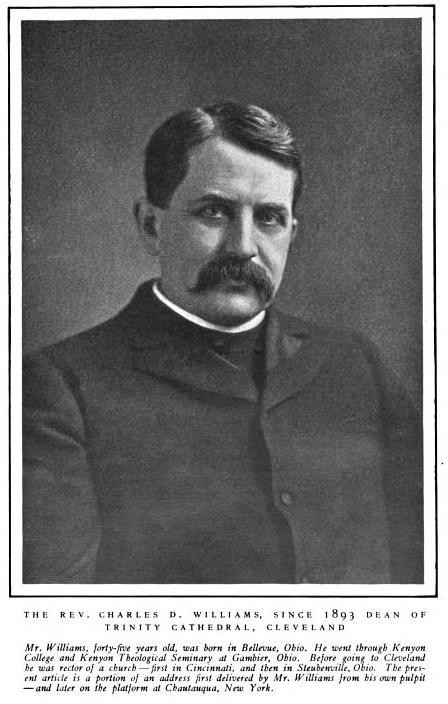
Charles D. Williams

- Yelverton Peyton Morgan 1882-1891
- Charles David Williams 1893-1906
- Frank Dumoulin 1907-1914
- Henry Pryor Almon Abbott 1914-1919
- Francis Samuel White 1920-1931
- Chester Burge Emerson 1932-1951
- Percy F. Rex 1953-1957
- David Loegler 1958-1968
- Perry Roberts Williams 1968-1989
- William D. Persell 1991-1999
- Tracey Lind 2000–2017
- Bernard J. “BJ” Owens 2018-

== See also ==
- List of the Episcopal cathedrals of the United States
- List of cathedrals in the United States
