= Robert Addison (missionary) =

Canadian clergyman and missionary

Reverend Robert Addison (1754–1829) was a Canadian clergyman and missionary of the Church of England.

He was born in Heversham, Westmorland, the 3rd son of John and Ellinor (Parkinson) of Plumbtreebank. He entered Trinity College, Cambridge, in 1777, completing his BA in 1781 and was ordained a Deacon of the Church of England in Norwich, Norfolk, on 11 March 1781.

He married his first wife Mary Atkinson in 1780 in Whittlesey, Cambridgeshire. Mary is thought to have been a descendant of Bishop Ridley.

Robert applied to the Church of England's Society for the propagation of the Gospel in Foreign Parts for missionary work in 1791 and was accepted for a position in May of that year. He was only the second Protestant clergyman to venture into Upper Canada, the first being Anglican Rev John Stuart, who arrived in Cataraqui (Kingston) in 1786.

Robert, his two young daughters Elizabeth and Mary and his sister Mary sailed for Canada in the summer and arrived in Quebec, probably in September, where he wintered before proceeding to Upper Canada. His wife Mary did not accompany him as she was pregnant with a son, Robert, born later in 1791. She remained in England and is believed to have suffered from depression and had died, likely in 1796, but possibly as late as 1809. When Rev Robert arrived in Newark, Ontario, in 1792 the government of Upper Canada was located at Newark, until it was moved to York in 1796.

As a young missionary he became chaplain of the legislature. He was the only resident Anglican clergyman, in fact the only clergyman west of Kingston and built the first church in Upper Canada to have regular services, St. Marks, at Niagara-on-the-Lake. This church was completed in 1809. During the War of 1812 it was burned, and restored finally in 1826, much as it is to-day. In 1796 he was the Chaplain of the House of Assembly (the provincial legislature) for which he received $100 a year and by 1798 was being provided 100 pounds per annum for his missionary work.

Before 1809, Rev. Robert Addison had preached in the Masonic Hall and other places. He ministered to Indians and whites from Fort Erie to the Grand River, preaching at intervals to the Mohawks in their church near Brantford, built in 1786. His Niagara congregation included Col. and Mrs. John Butler, Hon. William Dickson, General Isaac Brock, Hon. Robert Hamilton Secord, the Jarvis Family and others. During the War of 1812 he was chaplain of the British and Canadian forces, and, it is said, during his imprisonment by American troops, he ministered to them. He conducted General Brock's funeral services at Fort George.

As well as being a clergyman, Robert was an entrepreneur. When the church could not pay him wages for his services rendered to the province he accepted grants of land in the Niagara Peninsula. He petitioned for other land grants in lieu of salary and eventually owned substantial land holdings across the province including lots in the township of Niagara, Stamford, East Flamborough, Dereham, Walsingham, Wawanosm and Deer Park in Toronto. On his death in 1829 he had some 6000 acres (24 km²) of Norwich land in his name. He left the management of this property to his second wife, Rebecca.

Robert brought the first library or collection of books of any significance to Canada when he landed in Niagara in 1792. The books were believed to have originally been the property of his father in law, Richard Atkinson (father of first wife Mary) who was the curate of Whittlesey and died in Oct 1781. They were housed in the rectory for many years and then became property of Brock University. They were repatriated to St Mark's Church, (Church of England, now Anglican Church of Canada) which Addison founded at Niagara on the Lake and are now held in The Addison Library in Addison Hall, adjacent to the church. There are over 1200 volumes, many dating to the 16th and 17th century and they are accessible to the public for research purposes.

Addison was followed to Canada by several other family members who settled in southern Ontario in the 1800s.
