= Winslow Ames =

American art historian (1907–1990)

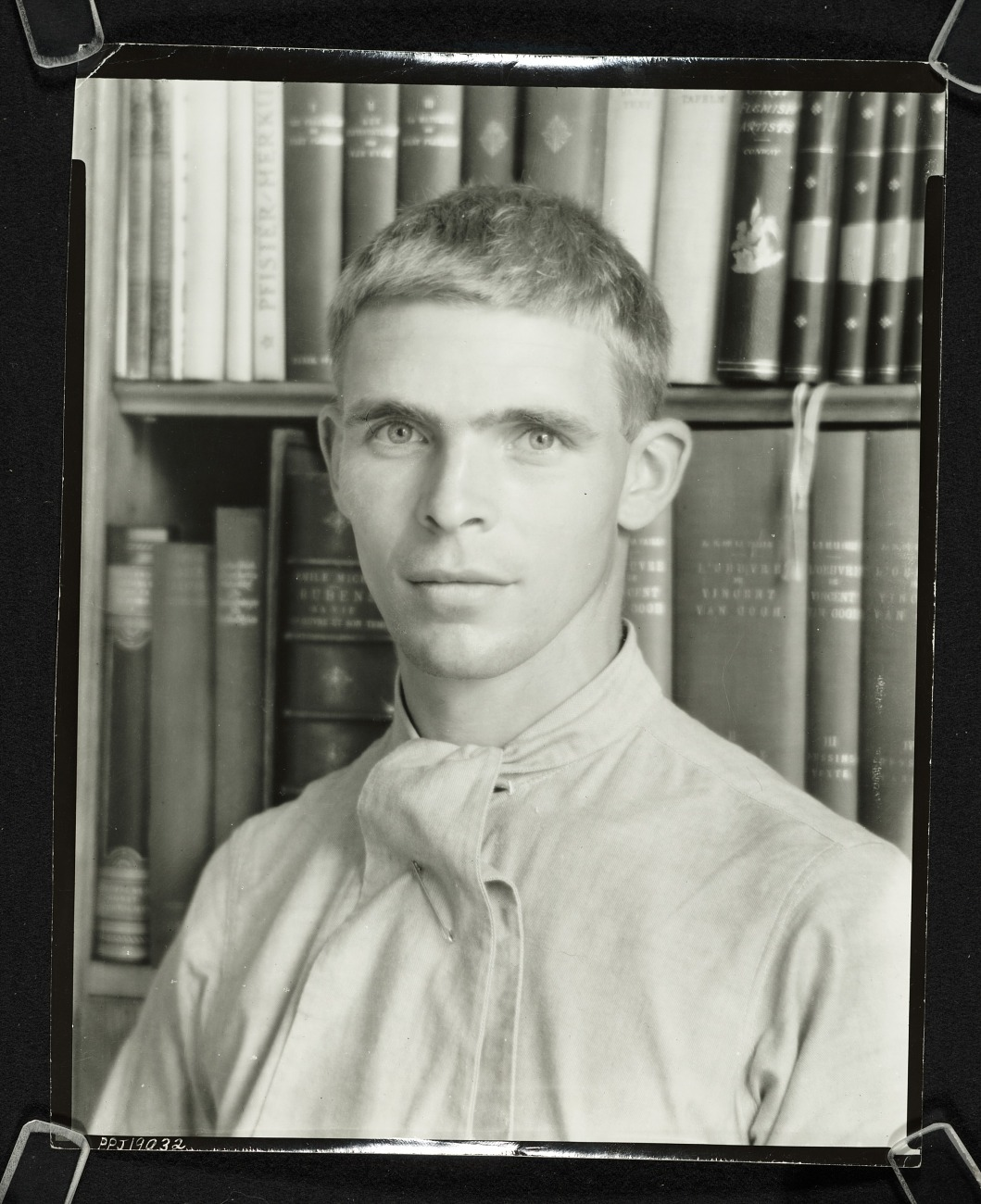
- Ames in 1935.
- Born: Edward Winslow Ames Jr. July 3, 1907; Maullín, Los Lagos, Chile
- Died: October 3, 1990 (aged 83); Wakefield, Rhode Island, United States
- Education: Harvard University; Columbia University
- Occupations: Art historian; museum director; academic
- Employer(s): University of Rhode Island; Springfield Art Museum; Gallery of Modern Art; Hollins College; Brown University; Connecticut College; Lyman Allyn Art Museum
- Spouse: Anna Rebecca Ames (née Gerhard)
- Children: 5
- Relatives: Azel Ames (paternal grandfather)

Edward Winslow Ames Jr. (July 3, 1907 – October 3, 1990) was an American art historian, author, and museum director. His academic research focused on Victorian art, but he "also had a deep interest in Modernism and the art of his own period".

== Early life ==
Ames was born in Maullín, Chile, where his father was a diplomat and later worked for Companier de Maderes del Ato Parana, a lumber company. His parents were Katherine Millicent (née Johnson) and Edward "Ted" Winslow Ames. His grandfather was Azel Ames, a noted physician and author. However, Ames recalled, "The Ames family was not rich. My mother was."

The family went back and forth between the United States and Latin America, but he was primarily raised in Staten Island, New York, and Boston, Massachusetts. In 1917, his father was the diplomat for Guatemala where Ames witnessed the impact of war and extreme poverty.

He attended Staten Island Academy and went to Phillips-Andover Academy in 1921. Although his father wanted him to attend Harvard, Ames wanted to go elsewhere because "there were too many people going to Harvard from Andover". He chose Columbia University, receiving a B.A. in 1929 after 3.5 years. While at Columbia, he took up rowing and joined the social and literary Fraternity of Delta Psi (St. Anthony Hall) which Ames says was crucial to stimulating his interest in the arts. He also attended exhibitions at the Metropolitan Museum of Art.

In 1932, he received an MA in art history from Harvard University where he studied with Paul J. Sachs and Edward W. Forbes. While at Harvard, he lived in the Delta Psi M.I.T. chapter house.

== Career ==
With the assistance of Paul J. Sachs, Ames secured a position as founding director of the Lyman Allyn Art Museum in New London, Connecticut. He began work in 1930 while the museum was still under construction and had no items in its collection. The New York Times noted, "Winslow Ames, the director, has mapped out an acquisition program that, as it develops, out to make the museum both distinctive and peculiarly valuable." He started collecting drawings and New London County or early furniture, and decided to focus on drawings, prints, and sculptures. He also created a library and collection of lantern slides for the museum. He did not collect modern art because the museum's trustees "weren't particularly keen on it." He worked at the Lyman Allyn Art Museum until 1942.

After World War II, he spent a year studying Prince Albert and Victorian art in England and Germany. This eventually led to a book, Prince Albert and Victorian Taste that was published by Viking in 1967.

He was the first paid director of the Springfield Art Museum in Springfield Missouri, from 1947 to 1950. From 1957 to 1961, he was the first director of Huntington Hartford's Gallery of Modern Art at 2 Columbus Circle in Manhattan, working with the collection before the museum opened to the public.

He taught at several colleges and universities, including Connecticut College in the 1930s, Brown University in the 1940s, Hollins College from 1964 to 1965, and University of Rhode Island from 1966 to 1972 and 1973–1975. He also did some appraisal work, especially with early furniture and drawings.

== Prefab houses ==
While at the Century of Progress world exhibition in Chicago in 1933, Ames saw General House's model home and met Howard T. Fisher, its chief architect. He believed these prefabricated houses were the future with their "stark International-style appearance". He had two of these structures built on the property of Lyman Allyn Art Museum where he was employed as the museum's director.

In November 1933, he commissioned General House to erect the House of Steel, a prefab house. He also commissioned American Homes, Inc. and architect Robert W. McLaughlin Jr. to construct an International style prefabricated "Moto Home" now known as the Winslow Ames House. The Ames used these houses as rental properties, although they lived in the Moto Home for a short time.

Both houses were sold to Connecticut College in 1949. The Winslow Ames House underwent extensive restoration in 1994, with funding from the Connecticut Historical Commission, and is on the National Register of Historic Places. The House of Steel survives, but was significantly modified.

== Works ==
Ames' papers are held at the Archives of American Art, Smithsonian Institution. Selected works include:

=== Books ===
- The Mastery of Drawing, translated and expanded from Joseph Meder's Die Handzeichnung, Abaris Books,1978.
- Prince Albert and Victorian Taste, Viking, 1967
- Italian Drawings (Great Master Drawings of All Time, Volume 1). Shorewood Press, 1962

=== Journals ===
- "Sebastien Leclerc and Antoine Coypel for the 'Petite Academie,'" Master Drawings, (1983), vol. 21, no. 1, pp. 3–89.
- "Bouchardon and Company." Master Drawings, (1975) vol. 13, no. 4, pp. 379–447.
- :"London 1862: Crystal Palace as Academy," Journal of the Society of Architectural Historians, (October 1971) Vol. 30, No. 3, pp. 247.
- "The Transformation of Château-Sur-Mer." Journal of the Society of Architectural Historians, (1970) vol. 29, no. 4, pp. 291–306.
- "A Bust of a Woman by Bellange." Master Drawings (1966) vol. 4, no. 4, pp. 434–99.
- "New York Brownstone through German Eyes, 1851." Journal of the Society of Architectural Historians (1966) vol. 25, no. 1, pp. 63–64.
- "The Vermont State House." Journal of the Society of Architectural Historians (1964) vol. 23, no. 4, pp. 193–99.
- "The 'Villa Dal Timpano Arcuato' by Francesco Guardi." Master Drawings (1963) vol. 1, no. 3, pp. 37–81.
- "Review of Inside Victorian Walls, by E. A. Entwisle, et al. Victorian Studies (1961), vol. 5, no. 2, pp. 151–62.
- "Spectatorship of F. Ambrose Clark and a Well-Made Book." Connoisseur (December 1959) vol. 144, pp. 200–205.
- "Two Drawings by Palma Giovine: With French Tr." Gazette des Beaux-Arts (1955) March, pp. 171–95.
- "Rembrandt Composition Remodeled." Art Quarterly (1954) vol. 17, no. 1, pp. 60–62.
- "Some Physical Types Favored by Western Artists; with French Translation." Gazette des Beaux-Arts, (1954), September, pp. 91–139.
- "Drawings by Contemporaries and by Old Masters." Magazine of Art (March 1953) vol. 46, pp. 123–30.
- "Some Woodcuts by Hendrick Goltzius and Their Program; with French Tr." Gazette des Beaux-Arts, (1948) June, pp. 425–65.
- "Drawing by Hans Baldung Grün at the Pierpont Morgan Library." Gazette des Beaux-Arts (1944) June, pp. 371–75.
- "Sketches for an Assumption of the Virgin by Fra Bartolommeo." Gazette des Beaux-Arts, (1944) April, pp. 215–20.
- "Drawings in the Fogg", Magazine of Art, American Federation of Arts, (January 1941) vol. 34, no. 1, pp. 34–37, 47–48.
- "Contemporary American Artists: Richmond Barthé." Parnassus (1940) vol. 12, no. 3, pp. 10–17.
- "William Blake as Artist." Magazine of Art. (February 1939) vol. 32, pp. 68–73.
- "A Drawing by the Monogrammist C. B." Bulletin of the Fogg Art Museum (1938) vol. 8, no. 1, pp. 36–40.
- "Chiaroscuro Woodcuts." Parnassus (1937) vol. 9, no. 2, pp. 5–8.
- "Portrait of American Industry; City Interior by Charles Sheeler." Worcester Art Museum Annual (January 1937) vol. 2, pp. 96–98
- "Gaston Lachaise 1882–1935." Parnassus (1936) vol. 8, no. 3, pp. 5–31.

== Professional affiliations ==
Ames was a member of the Archives of American Art, the Author's Guild, the Drawing Society, the New England Appraisers Association, the Royal Society of Arts, the Victorian Society, and the Victorian Society in America. He was also a member of the Antiquarian & Landmarks Society of Connecticut, the Rhode Island Historical Society, and Society for the Preservation of New England Antiquities. In 1958, he was a member of the advisory council to Columbia University's department of art history and archaeology. He was also a member of the Society of Architectural Historians, serving on its board beginning in 1976.

== Personal ==
Ames married Anna Rebecca Gerhard, the sister of his Delta Psi fraternity brother, William George Gerhard, on June 27, 1931, at St. Peter's Episcopal Church in Philadelphia, Pennsylvania. They had five daughters.

He was a pacifist. During World War II, he registered as a conscientious objector. In 1943, he was assigned to a Civilian Public Service Camp in Virginia that worked in timber stand improvement and soil conservation. He was then assigned to be the assistant director, later director, of a camp in Ohio. After the war, he was a member of the American Friends Service Committee, working out of Paris, France, to help transport dislocated people back to their farms and to relocate people who had lost their homes. Ames became the first director of what was called the European Transport Unit, working in both Brittany and Southern France.

In the 1950s, the Ames family moved to Saunderstown, Rhode Island, where they lived in a house designed by Rockwell King DuMoulin, a Delta Psi fraternity brother.

In 1959, Ames was a guest layman, giving a sermon on the "ministry of reconciliation" at the Protestant Episcopal Church of the Epiphany in New York City. He said, "We are called not to intensify differences, not to quash objections, not to make artificial, neat barriers, but to acknowledge and reconcile differences and find rewards in them." During the Vietnam War, Ames became a sponsor of the War Tax Resistance project, which practiced and advocated tax resistance as a form of protest against the war.

He was a member of the Order of Colonial Lords of Manors in America. He was treasurer of the Episcopal Peace Fellowship from 1948 to 1968. He was also a member of the North Kingston School Building and Planning Committee from 1966 to 1967, and the Rhode Island Historical Preservation Commission in 1968.

In 1990, he died after a heart attack at Wakefield Hospital in Rhode Island at the age of 83.
