= Lyman Allyn Art Museum =

Coordinates: 41.3737°N 72.1072°W

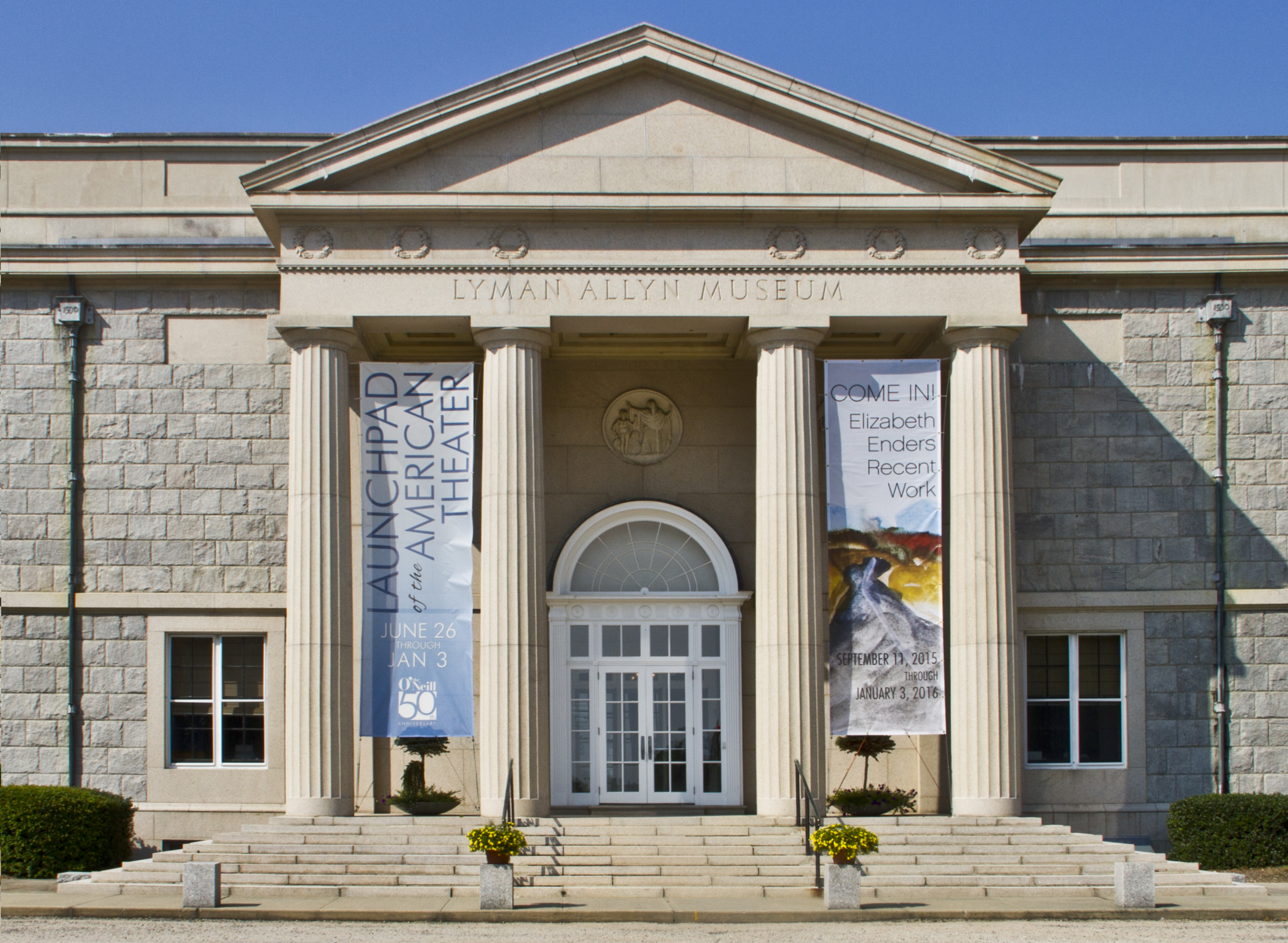
- The museum's facade in 2015
- Established: 1926
- Location: 625 Williams Street; New London, Connecticut, United States
- Type: Art museum
- Website: www.lymanallyn.org

The Lyman Allyn Art Museum is located in New London, Connecticut, and was founded in 1926 by Lyman Allyn's daughter Harriet Upson Allyn. Its collection includes European and non-Western art as well as American fine and decorative art, 17th-century European works on paper, 19th-century American paintings, and contemporary art. The museum also conducts educational programs.

The Deshon-Allyn House on the museum's campus is a Federal style house built in 1829 by Daniel Deshon, sold to Lyman Allyn, and occupied by various members of his family. It is listed on the National Register of Historic Places.

== History ==
The Lyman Allyn Art Museum was founded with a bequest from Harriet Upson Allyn, who died on November 30, 1926. She made the bequest in memory of her father Lyman Allyn, a wealthy shipping merchant, to be used to create a new park and museum, a place for local citizens to learn about art and culture.

Land for the project was purchased in 1927. Landscape architect Ferruccio Vitale designed the park, and architect Charles A. Platt designed the 32,000 square-foot neoclassical museum, built with local granite.

In May 1930, Winslow Ames was chosen to be the museum's first Director at age 22. The museum was dedicated on the evening of May 2, 1932 with Connecticut Governor Wilbur Lucius Cross as the principal speaker, and the museum opened to the public the following day.

== Collection ==
Lyman Allyn's permanent collection consists of approximately 10,000 objects. Much of this collection was developed by the museum's first Director Winslow Ames, who acquired works dating from the 16th through the 19th centuries. It includes the graphite Study for Madame Moitessier standing by Jean-Auguste-Dominique Ingres, as well as works by Frederic Leighton, François Boucher, Nicolas Poussin, Claude Lorrain, Charles LeBrun, and Tiepolo. Featured artists include Rembrandt Peale, Benjamin West, Gilbert Stuart, John Trumbull, Thomas Cole, Frederick Edwin Church, and Albert Bierstadt.

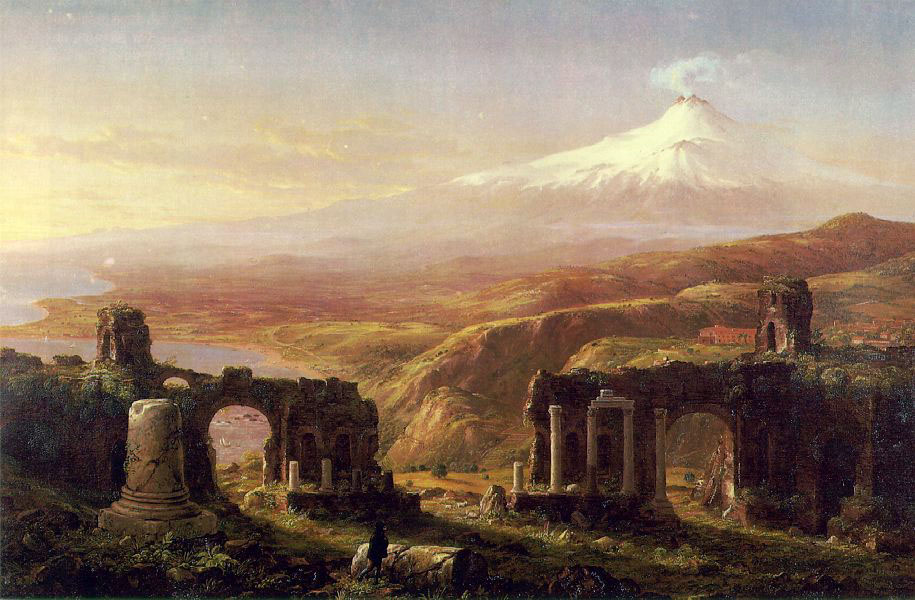
Thomas Cole, Mount Aetna from Taormina (1844)

=== American art ===
The Lyman Allyn's collection of 19th-century American paintings ranges from the Hudson River School to the Aesthetic Movement and Impressionism. Thomas Cole’s Mount Aetna from Taormina (1844), Frederic Edwin Church’s Study for New England Scenery (1850), and John F. Kensett’s oval Bash Bish Falls (1851) are examples of the Hudson River School, while Winslow Homer’s tile painting The Shepherdess (1878) is an example of his work with the Tile Club. These American works are frequently requested for loan exhibitions and for reproduction in scholarly articles and exhibition catalogues.

The museum also holds a collection of eighteenth-century American paintings, works on paper, and decorative arts, most notably silver and furniture. The core of this collection consists of John Singleton Copley’s three studies for The Siege of Gibraltar (c.1785-86), two works by Benjamin West, and Winthrop Chandler’s portrait of Eunice Huntington Devotion and Her Daughter (1772). There is also an eighteenth-century New England furniture collection, including many examples of New London County’s unique regional variations. New London County furniture has been the focus of a comprehensive exhibition at the Lyman Allyn in 1974 and smaller, focused exhibitions in 1986 and 1999. The facade of the museum features three bas relief medallions created by American sculptor Joseph Kiselewski in 1930.
