= Thomas Fuller (bishop) =

Canadian Anglican bishop (1810–1884)

Thomas Brock Fuller was a Canadian Anglican bishop in the second half of the 19th century.

Fuller was born in Kingston, Ontario on 16 July 1810 and educated in Hamilton, Ontario. He was ordained in 1833 and his first post was as a curate in Montreal. In 1836 he was sent as a missionary to Chatham-Kent, Ontario and in 1840 became the rector of St John the Evangelist's Thorold. In 1861 he was appointed the rector of St George's Church, Toronto and in 1869 the Archdeacon of Niagara. In 1875 he became the first bishop of the Diocese of Niagara. He died on 17 December 1884.
