= Philip Du Moulin =

Canadian Anglican bishop

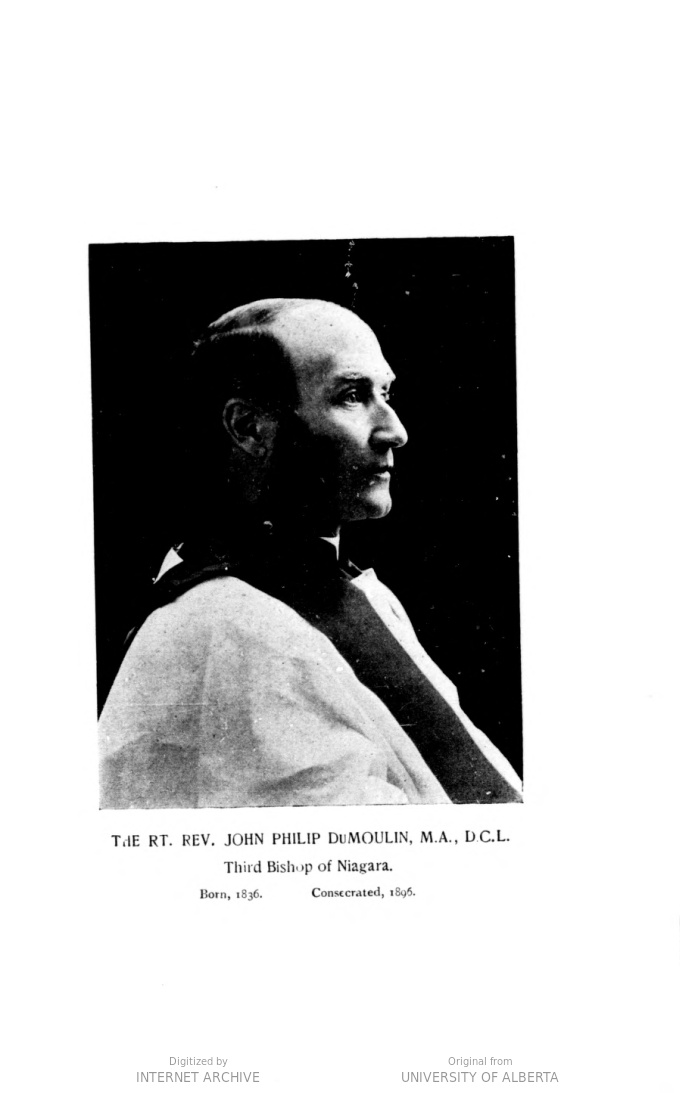
photo of Reverend John Philip DuMoulin

John Philip Du Moulin was a Canadian Anglican bishop in the last decade of the 19th century and the first two of the 20th century.

Born in 1834, he was educated at Trinity College, Dublin, Ireland and ordained in 1863. His first posts were curacies at St John's, London, Ontario and Holy Trinity, Montreal. He held incumbencies at St Thomas's Hamilton and St Martin's Montreal. He was then a canon at St James's Cathedral, Toronto and then Sub-Dean of St Alban's Cathedral in the same city before his ordination in 1896 to the episcopate as the third Bishop of Niagara. He died on 29 March 1911.

Church of England titles
Preceded by Charles Hamilton	Bishop of Niagara; 1896 –1911	Succeeded by William Reid Clark
