= Walter Bagnall =

Canadian Anglican bishop

Walter Edward Bagnall (1903–1984) was a Canadian Anglican bishop

Born in Birr, County Offaly, Ireland in 1903 and educated at the University of Western Ontario he was ordained in 1928. He was Curate of All Saints, Windsor and then held incumbencies at St Mark's, London, St John's, Preston, All Saints, Hamilton and St George's, St Catharines. He was Dean of Niagara from 1947 to 1949 and then its diocesan bishop until his retirement in 1973. He died in 1984.
