= List of Bishop's University alumni =

Bishop's University is a liberal arts university in Lennoxville, Quebec, Canada. Following are some of its notable alumni.

== Art ==
- Kay Kinsman, visual artist

== Education ==
- Susan Boyd, feminist legal scholar, the inaugural chair in Feminist Legal Studies, founder of the Centre for Feminist Legal Studies, and Professor Emerita at UBC
- Scott Griffin, Chancellor of Bishop's University
- Lisa Guenther, Queen's National Scholar in Political Philosophy and Critical Prison Studies at Queen's University in Kingston
- David McKnight, anthropologist, ethnographer, and senior lecturer at London University
- Frederick Edmund Meredith, Chancellor of Bishop's University
- George Siber, medical researcher, vaccine expert, and professor at Harvard and Johns Hopkins University
- Colin Starnes, former President of the University of King's College
- Norman Webster, Chancellor of University of Prince Edward Island and former editor-in-chief of The Globe and Mail
- Barrie Wilson, Professor Emeritus and senior scholar in Religious Studies at York University
- George Whalley, poet and English professor at Queen's University

== Film and entertainment ==
- Alex Bulmer, playwright and theatre artist
- Jim Corcoran, singer, songwriter and radio host
- Jake Eberts, film producer, executive and financier
- Cameron Hughes, professional crowd igniter and sports entertainer
- Andy Keen, documentary filmmaker
- Galt MacDermot, musician, arranger, and composer of the 1960s rock musical Hair
- Silvio Narizzano, film and television director who worked primarily in the United Kingdom
- Damian Pettigrew, film director, best known for Fellini, I'm a Born Liar
- Johnny Reid, country music singer

== Law ==
- Douglas Abbott, former justice of the Supreme Court of Canada and former Minister of National Defence and Minister of Finance
- Fred Kaufman, justice with the Québec Court of Appeal and acting-Chief Justice of Québec
- John Sewell Sanborn, judge with the Quebec Superior Court and the Court of Queen's Bench at Montreal and member of the Senate of Canada
- Jamie W. S. Saunders, former justice of the Nova Scotia Court of Appeal

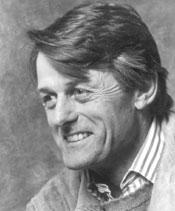
Scott Griffin

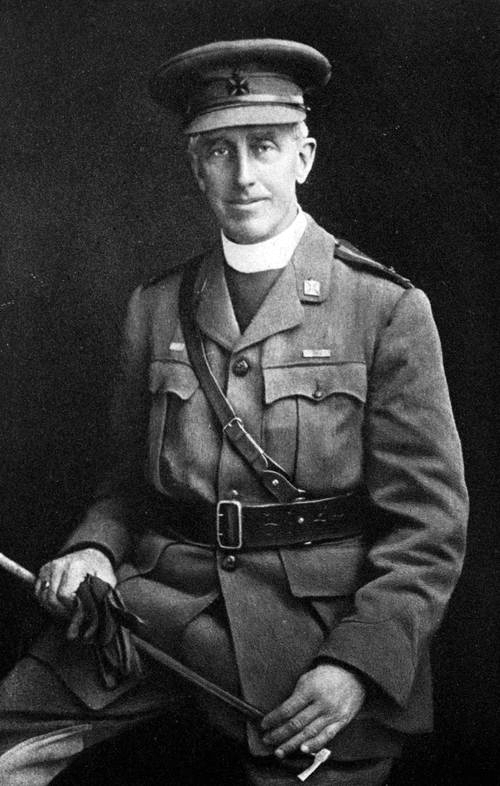
Canon Frederick Scott

== Literature and journalism ==
- John W. H. Bassett, publisher of the Montreal Gazette and the Toronto Telegram, founder of CFTO-TV, owner of the Toronto Argonauts, 1961–1971
- Jane Brierley, translator of books and editorial translator for The Globe and Mail
- Ralph Gustafson, poet
- Scott Griffin, founder of the Griffin Poetry Prize, one of the world's most generous poetry awards
- Helen Anne Henderson, journalist and disability rights advocate
- Michael Ondaatje, poet, writer, best known for the novel The English Patient
- Canon Frederick Scott, poet and senior chaplain with the First Canadian Division, Canadian Expeditionary Force in World War I
- F. R. Scott, winner of the Governor General's Award for poetry and non-fiction
- Ian Stephens, poet, journalist, and musician
- Alexis S. Troubetzkoy, author notable for his works on Russian history
- Norman Webster, former editor-in-chief of The Globe and Mail and chancellor of University of Prince Edward Island

== Military ==
- William Heneker, military strategist and tactician during World War I and one of the most highly decorated Canadians in the British Empire
- Duncan "Dusty" Miller, Vice Admiral and Naval Task Commander aboard HMCS Athabaskan during the Gulf War
- Robert Moncel, Lieutenant-General of the Canadian Army and former Vice Chief of the Defence Staff
- Sydney Valpy Radley-Walters, Brigadier General in the Canadian Army, decorated tank ace with the Sherbrooke Fusilier Regiment during the Second World War

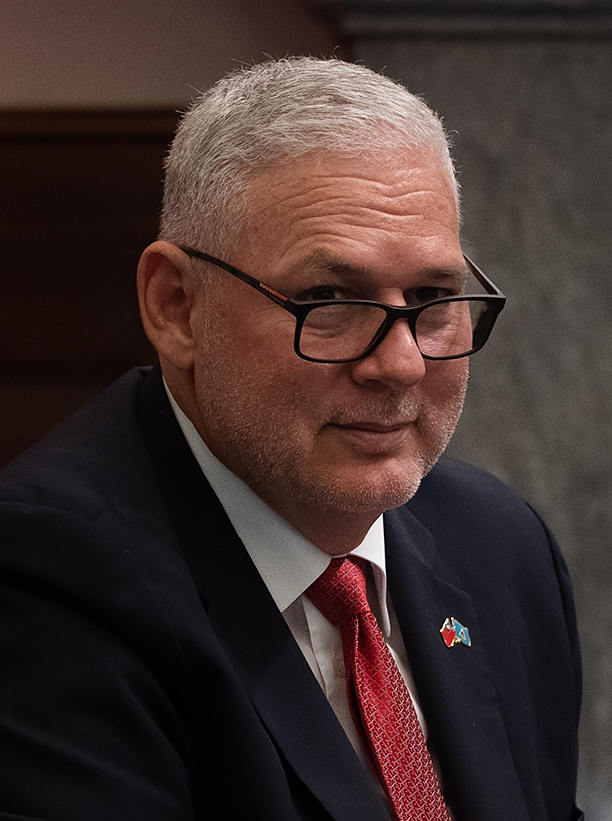
Allen Chastenet

== Politics and government ==
- Monroe Abbey, lawyer and president of Canadian Jewish Congress
- Douglas Abbott, former Minister of National Defence and Minister of Finance and former justice of the Supreme Court of Canada
- William P. Anderson, long-serving Canadian Superintendent of Lighthouses
- Alfred Pike Bissonnet, director of the Trade Commissioner Service and Ambassador Extraordinary and Plenipotentiary to Indonesia, Argentina, Paraguay, and Urugua
- Peter Blaikie, former president of the Progressive Conservative Party of Canada and television commentator
- Richard Cannings, former Ottawa City Councillor
- Allen Chastenet, seventh Prime Minister of St. Lucia
- Roy Cullen, former Liberal member of Parliament for the riding of Etobicoke North
- Robert Ghiz, former Premier of Prince Edward Island
- James King, Legislative Assembly of Quebec
- George Hugh Macdonell, House of Commons of Canada
- Jason MacDonald, Prime Minister Stephen Harper's Director of Communications
- James Maloney, House of Commons of Canada
- Alexander Webb Morris, Legislative Assembly of Quebec
- John Sewell Sanborn, member of the Senate of Canada and judge with thee Quebec Superior Court and the Court of Queen's Bench at Montreal
- Reed Scowen, member of the National Assembly of Quebec
- Raymond Setlakwe, Canadian Senator
- Steve Shanahan, Montreal City Council
- Larry Smith, Canadian Senator, former president of the Montreal Alouettes, and commissioner of the Canadian Football League
- John Kennett Starnes, Canadian Ambassador to the Federal Republic of Germany, Egypt, and Sudan

== Religion ==
- John Almond, Anglican priest in Canada in the first half of the 20th century
- Russel Brown, Anglican priest and eighth Bishop of Quebec
- James Carmichael, fourth Anglican Bishop of Montreal
- Patrick Clark, Anglican Bishop of Kootenay
- Kent Clarke, Anglican Bishop Suffragan of Niagara
- William Davis, Anglican Bishop Coadjutor of Nova Scotia, Archbishop of Nova Scotia, and Archbishop Metropolitan of the Ecclesiastical Province of Canada
- Harry Dawson, priest and Dean of Niagara
- Francis C. FitzHugh, Anglo-Catholic priest who served as rector of St. Clement's Church, Philadelphia
- Octave Fortin, Archdeacon of Winnipeg
- Graham Ingham, Anglican Bishop of Sierra Leone
- Edwin Lackey, Anglica Bishop of Ottawa and Metropolitan of Ontario
- Richard Lonsdell, Anglican Archdeacon of St Andrews in the Diocese of Montreal
- Tim Matthews, Anglican Bishop of Quebec
- William Moorhead, Anglican Bishop of Fredericton
- Percy O'Driscoll, Anglican Bishop of Huron and Metropolitan of Ontario
- Taylor Pryce, Anglican suffragan bishop in the Diocese of Toronto
- William Robinson, Anglican Bishop of Ottawa
- Canon Frederick Scott, poet and senior chaplain with the First Canadian Division, Canadian Expeditionary Force in World War I
- Buxton Smith, priest and Dean of Ontario
- George Thorneloe, Bishop of Algoma, Metropolitan of Ontario, and Archbishop of Algoma
- Robert Waterman, Anglican Bishop Coadjutor of Nova Scotia

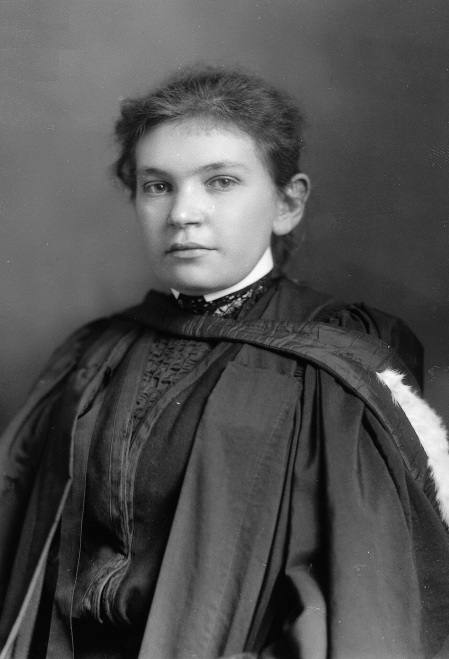
Maude Abbott

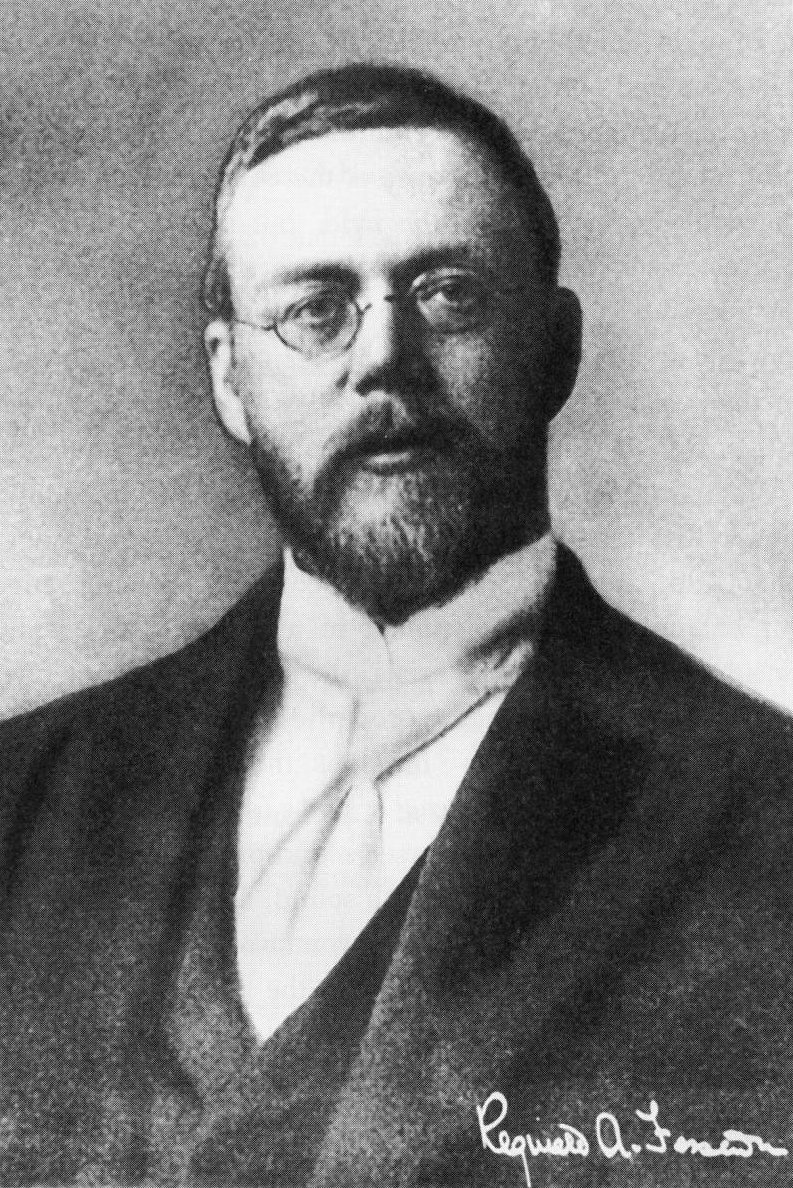
Reginald Fessenden

== Science and medicine ==
- Maude Abbott, one of Canada's earliest female medical graduates, founder of the Federation of Medical Women of Canada
- Christopher Aikman , astrophysicist formerly with the Dominion Astrophysical Observatory
- Reginald Fessenden, inventor known for his pioneering work developing radio technology and transmitted the first radio audio broadcast
- Richard H. Tomlinson, chemist and founding director of Gennum Corp.

== Sports ==
- Stephen Adekolu, wide receiver for the Montreal Alouettes of the Canadian Football League
- Nick Arakgi, CFL football star and CFL's Most Outstanding Canadian Award winner
- Leroy Blugh, CFL player, CFL's Most Outstanding Canadian Award winner, and defensive assistant coach Ottawa Red Blacks
- Mathieu Boulay, CFL football player
- Gary Chown, CFL football player
- Adrian Clarke, CFL football player
- Gilles Colon, CFL football player
- Justin Conn, CFL football player
- Tim Cronk, CFL football player
- Robert Dunkley, sailor who competed in the Laser event at the 1996 Summer Olympics
- Tom Europe, CFL defensive back, BC Lions
- Kyle Exume, CFL football player
- Jermaine Gabriel, CFL football player
- Keith Godding, CFL wide receiver, Montreal Alouettes
- Shawn Gore, CFL professional football player
- Debbie Huband, women's basketball player who participated in the 1984 Summer Olympics
- Kyle Jones, CFL linebacker, Toronto Argonauts
- Jamall Lee, CFL running back, BC Lions
- Jason MacDonald, former mixed martial artist
- Josh Maveety, CFL football player
- Dan McCullough, former Canadian Football League player and the former head coach for the UNB Red Bombers of the Atlantic Football League
- Kelly Murumets, president and Chief Executive Officer (CEO) of Tennis Canada
- Elie Ngoyi, CFL football player
- J. K. L. Ross, sportsman and thoroughbred racehorse owner/breeder who won the first United States Triple Crown of Thoroughbred Racing with his colt, Sir Barton
- Chris Skinner (Canadian football), CFL football player
- Larry Smith, former president of the Montreal Alouettes, former commissioner of the Canadian Football League, current Canadian Senator
- Ryan Thorne, CIS basketball player with the Bishop's Gaiters
- Junior Turner, CFL football player
- Steven Turner, CFL football player
- Dan West, CFL football player
- James Yurichuk, former CFL Linebacker, BC Lions
- Steve Zatylny, Canadian football player
- Wally Zatylny, CFL wide receiver, Hamilton Tiger-Cats
