= Charles Carrington (priest) =

New Zealand priest

Charles Walter Carrington (1859–1941) was Dean of Christchurch from 1913 to 1927.

He was born in Bath, son of Henry Edmund Carrington, proprietor and editor of the Bath Chronicle, and was educated at the University of Cambridge. After an earlier career as an engineer he was ordained in 1888. After a curacy in Notting Hill he was Mission Chaplain to the Bishop of Lichfield then Vicar of Christ Church, West Bromwich. He was Principal of the Upper Department at Christ's College, Christchurch until his appointment as Dean.

He died on 30 July 1941. One of his sons, Philip, was Bishop of Quebec and Metropolitan of Canada; while another, Christopher, died in the First World War. His son Charles fought in both World Wars and became Professor of Commonwealth Relations at the Royal Institute of International Affairs.
