= Chaplains Branch =

Chaplains Branch could mean:

- Royal Canadian Chaplain Service
- Royal Air Force Chaplains Branch
- Royal Canadian Army Chaplain Corps
- Chaplain Corps (United States Army)
- Royal Army Chaplains' Department
