= Diocese of Quebec =

Diocese of Quebec may refer to:

- Anglican Diocese of Quebec, founded by Letters Patent in 1793
- Roman Catholic Archdiocese of Quebec, the oldest Catholic see in the New World north of Mexico
