= Sambandet =

Norwegian rock group

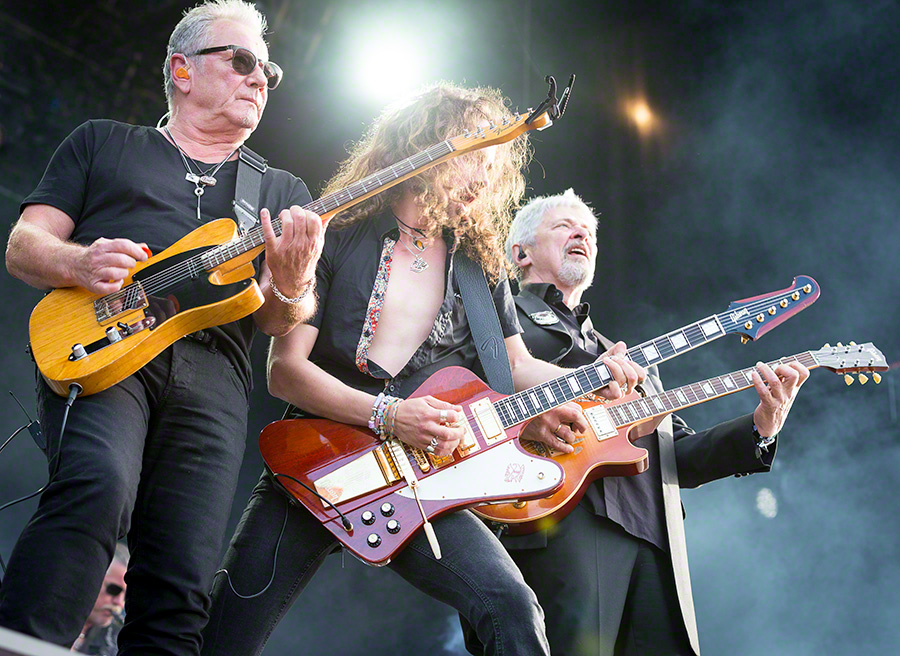
- Åge Aleksandersen and the guitarists in Sambandet at stage at Stavernvestivalen in 2016

Background information
- Origin: Norway
- Genres: Rock
- Years active: 1977–present
- Members: Skjalg Raaen; Steinar Krokstad; Gunnar Pedersen; Terje Tranaas; Morty Black; Bjørn Røstad

Sambandet is a Norwegian rock group and the backing band of Åge Aleksandersen. Almost always referred to in that capacity they combined are known as Åge Aleksandersen & Sambandet, and together they won the 1980 Spellemannprisen for Ramp as best rock album. The group's membership has varied throughout the years. Some of the members has been Steinar Krokstad, Skjalg Raaen, Terje Tranaas and Gunnar Pedersen. They recorded their first album in 1977 titled Lirekassa. Their most known hit is "Lys og varme" from 1984. The group had roots from Prudence. Sambandet broke up after the Eldorado touring in 1987 but reunited in 2004.

== Members ==
=== Current ===
- Skjalg Raaen - guitarist (2004–)
- Steinar Krokstad - drummer (1993–)
- Gunnar Pedersen - guitarist (1982–)
- Terje Tranaas - keyboardist (2003–)
- Morty Black - bassist
- Bjørn Røstad - saxophonist (1980–)
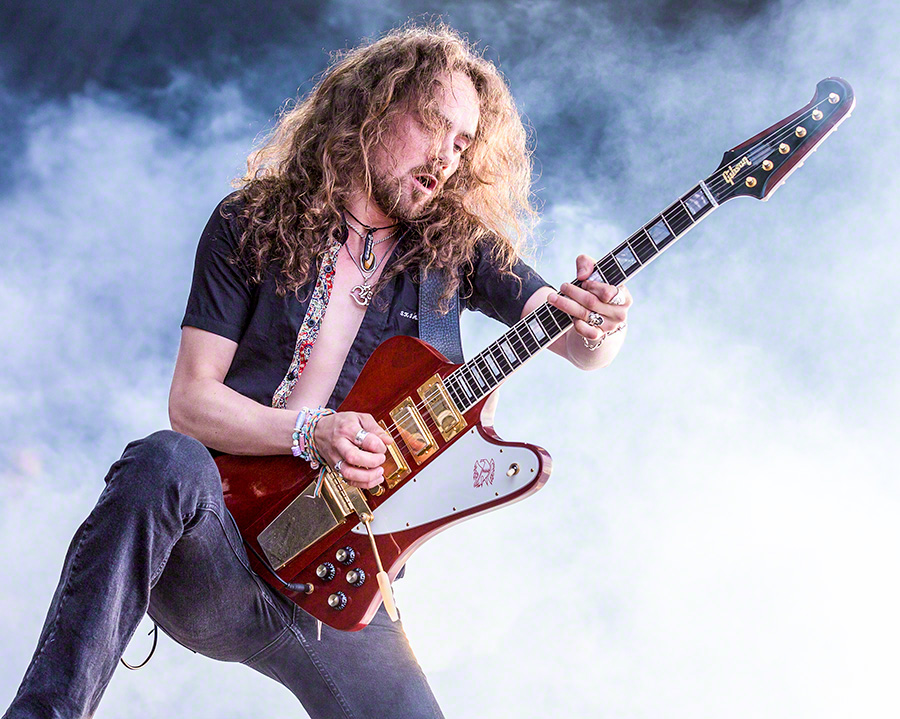
Skjalg Raaen

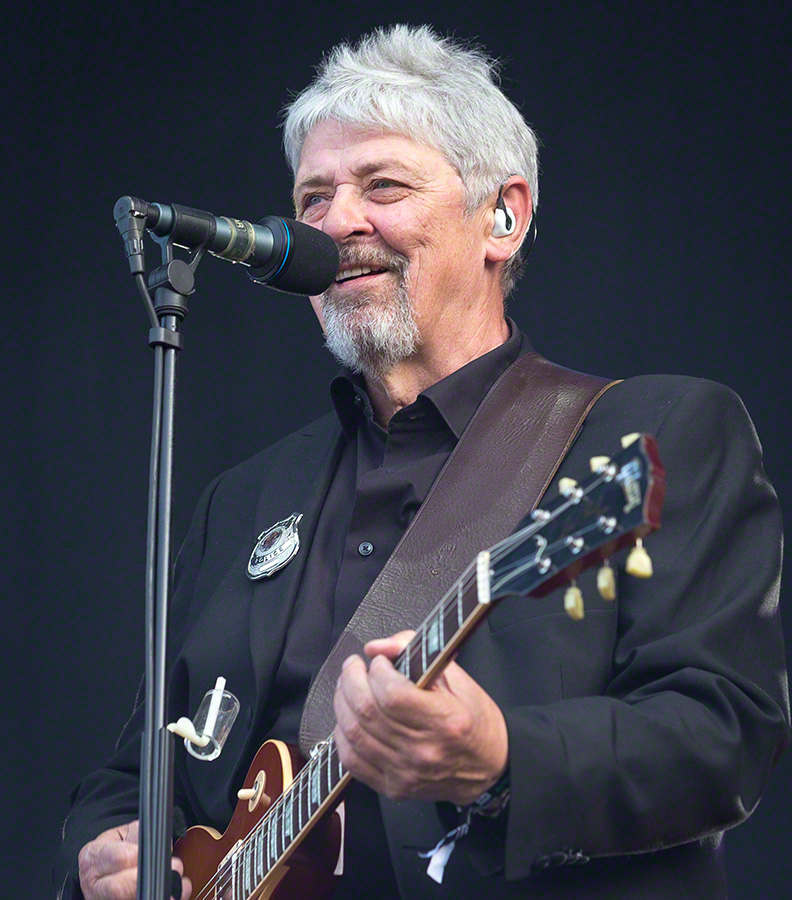
Gunnar Pedersen

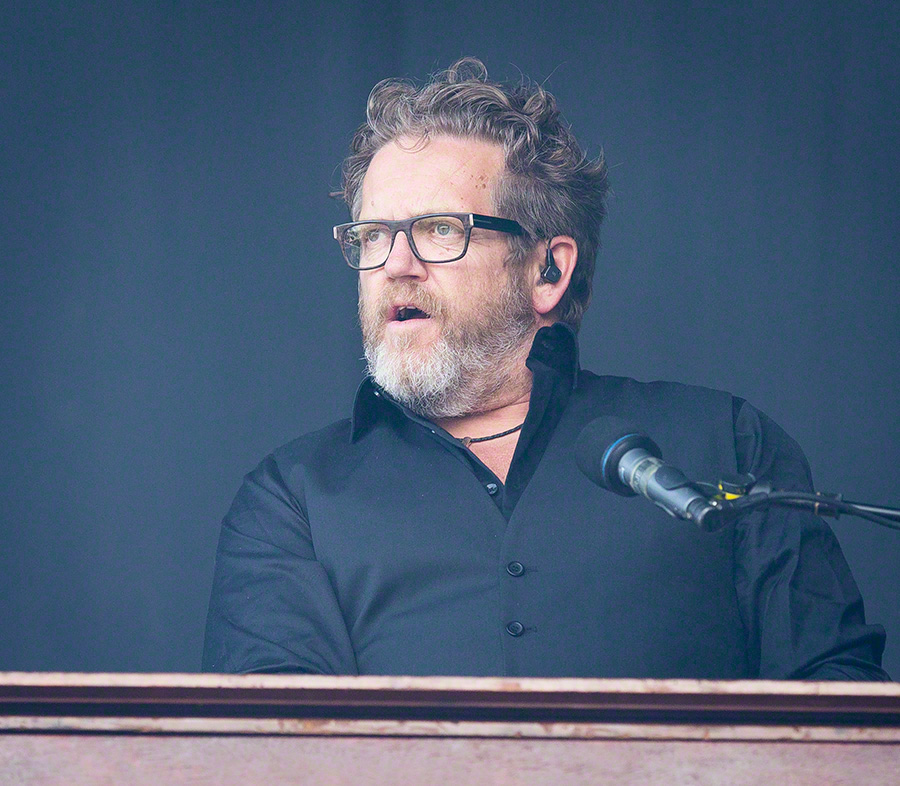
Terje Tranaas

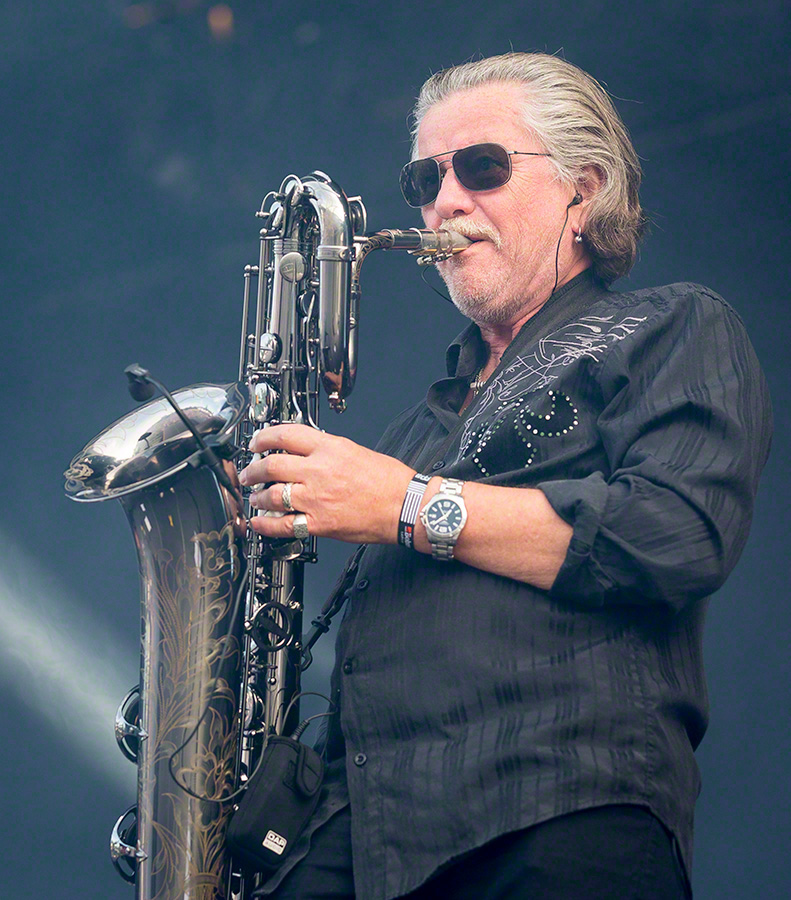
Bjørn Røstad

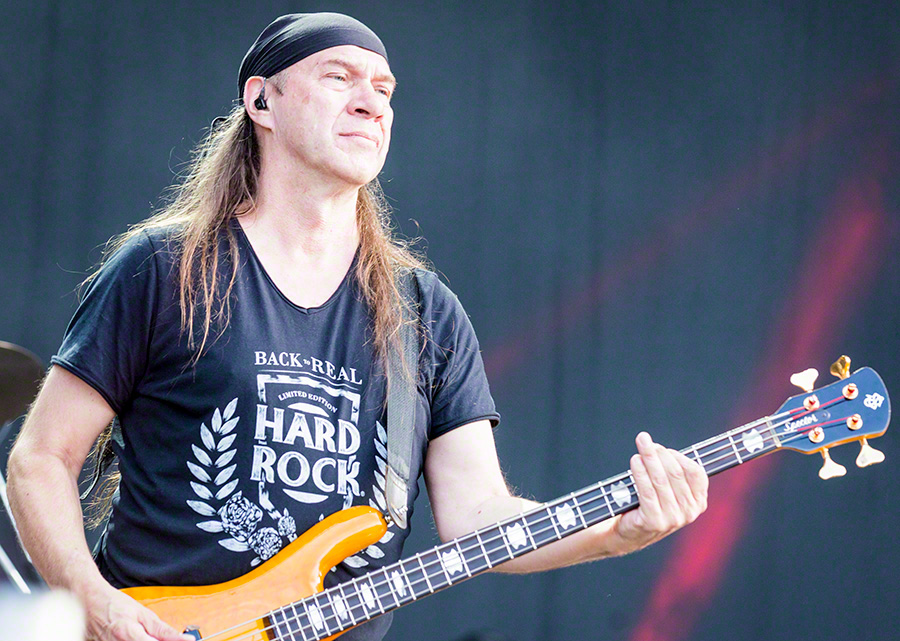
Morten Skaget / Morty Black

=== Former ===
- Arne Jacobsen - guitarist (1976–1978)
- Gunnar Andreas Berg - guitarist (1978–1979)
- Tor Evensen - bassist (1978–1987)
- Lasse Hafreager - keyboardist (1980–1987)
- Per Christian Lindstad - guitarist (1978)
- Lars Kim Moe - bass (1977)
- Geir Myklebust - guitarist (1978)
- Alf Skille - keyboardist (1978)
- Christian Schreiner - bassist (1976)
- Knut Stensholm - drummer (1978–1987)
- Kaare Skevik - drummer (1982–1987)
- Bård Svendsen - keyboard (1978–1979)

== Discography ==
=== Albums ===
- 1976: Mot i Brystet, Mord i Blikket, Bomben Und Granaten
- 1977: Lirekassa
- 1979: French only
- 1980: Ramp
- 1981: Mølje & Sodd
- 1982: Dains med mæ
- 1984: Levva Livet
- 1986: Eldorado
- 2005: To skritt frem
- 2005: 4 skritt tilbake
- 2008: Katalysator
- 2011: Furet værbitt

=== Singles ===
- 1977: "Positivitet"
- 1984: "Lys og varme"
- 2005: "Danserinnen"
- 2007: "Sommernatt"
- 2008: "Janne Ahonens smil"
