= Bruce Stavert =

Canadian Anglican metropolitan (1940–2023)

The Most Reverend Bruce Stavert
- Metropolitan of Canada
- Church: Anglican Church of Canada
- Diocese: Province of Canada
- In office: 2004–2009
- Predecessor: Andrew Hutchison
- Successor: Claude Miller
- Other post: Bishop of Quebec (1990–2009)

Orders
- Ordination: 1964

Personal details
- Born: 1 April 1940 Montreal, Quebec, Canada
- Died: 11 September 2023 (aged 83)
- Education: Trinity College (STB, MTh)

Alexander Bruce Stavert (1 April 1940 – 11 September 2023) was a Canadian Anglican prelate. He served as bishop of Quebec (1990–2009) and as metropolitan of Canada (2004–2009).

Born on 1 April 1940 in Montreal, Quebec, Canada, Stavert was educated at Trinity College in Toronto. He was ordained in 1964 and began his career at Schefferville, Quebec. He was a fellow and chaplain at his old college until 1976 and then the incumbent at St Clement's Mission East, St Paul's River in Quebec. He was chaplain at Bishop's University from 1981 to 1984; and then Dean of Saskatchewan until his elevation to the episcopate.

He was created a Companion of the Roll of Honour of the Memorial of Merit of King Charles the Martyr in 2011.

Stavert died on 11 September 2023, at the age of 83.

Anglican Communion titles
Preceded by Allen Goodings	Bishop of Quebec; 1990–2009	Succeeded by Dennis Drainville
Preceded by Andrew Sandford Hutchison	Metropolitan of Canada; 2004–2009	Succeeded by Claude Weston Miller
