= Peter Wall =

Peter Wall may refer to:

- Peter Wall (property developer) (1937–2025), Canadian property developer in Vancouver
  - Peter Wall Institute for Advanced Studies, the senior research institute at the University of British Columbia
- Peter Wall (footballer) (1944–2024), English professional footballer
- Peter Wall (British Army officer) (born 1955)
- Peter Wall (priest) (ordained 1989), Dean of the Diocese of Niagara
