= Bishop of Quebec =

Bishop of Quebec may refer to:

- Archbishop of the Archdiocese of Quebec
- Bishop of the Anglican Diocese of Quebec
