= Ernest Jackson =

Ernest Jackson may refer to:

- Ernest Jackson (gridiron football) (born 1986), American gridiron football wide receiver
- Ernest Jackson (footballer) (1914–1996), English footballer
- Ernest Jackson (priest), Canadian Anglican priest

== See also ==
- Earnest Jackson (born 1959), American football running back
- Francis Ernest Jackson (1872–1945), British painter, draughtsman, poster designer and lithographer
