= Christ's Church Cathedral (Hamilton, Ontario) =

Old Anglican church in Canada, cathedral church for the Anglican Diocese of Niagara

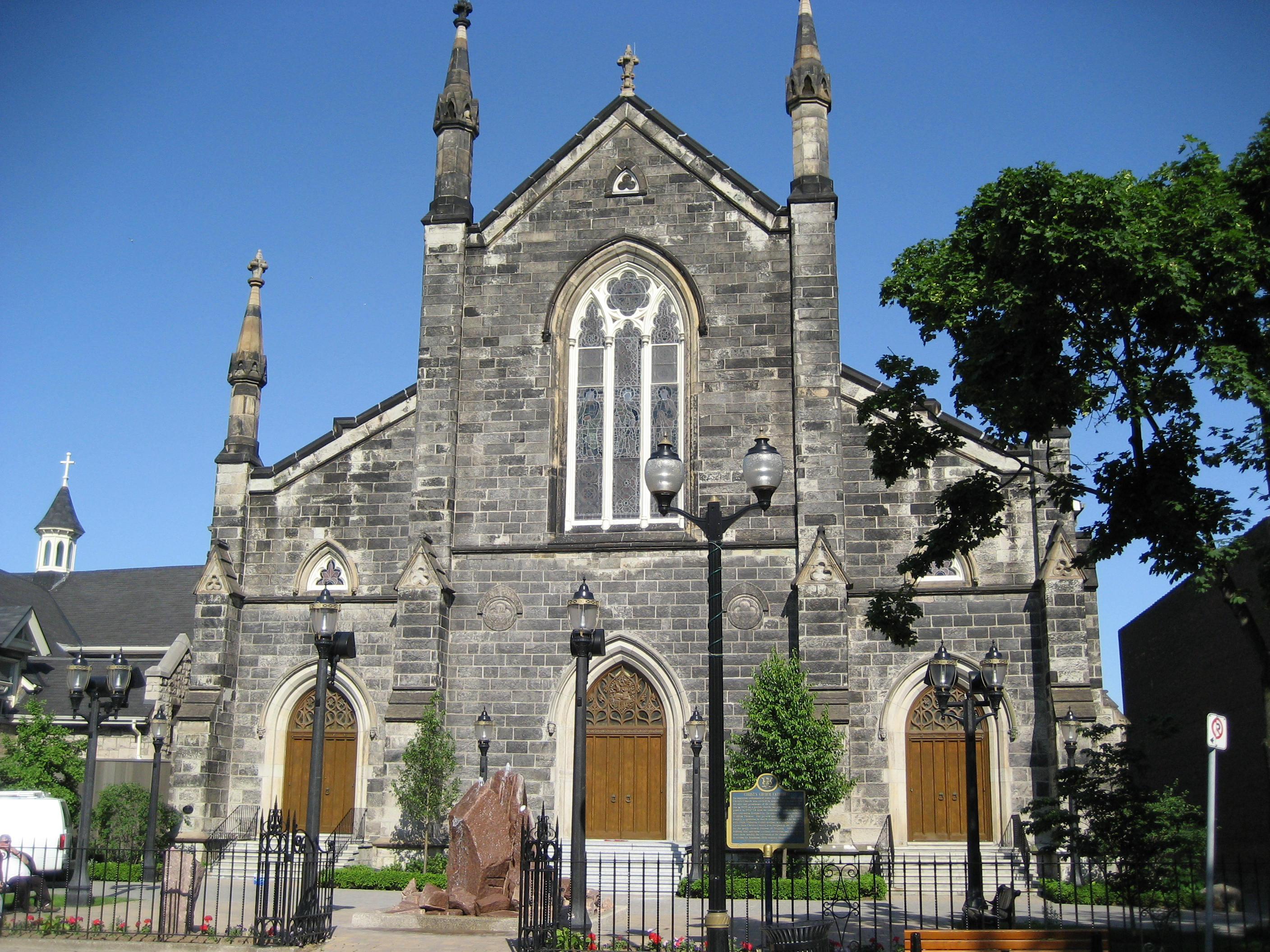
- Christ's Church Cathedral
- 43°15′47″N 79°51′58″W
- Location: 252 James Street North, Hamilton, Ontario
- Denomination: Anglican Church of Canada
- Website: cathedralhamilton.ca

History
- Status: Cathedral
- Founded: 1835
- Dedication: Christ

Architecture
- Functional status: Active
- Architect: Henry Langley
- Style: English Gothic
- Groundbreaking: 1852
- Completed: 1873

Administration
- Province: Ontario
- Diocese: Niagara
- Parish: Christ Church

Clergy
- Dean: The Very Rev. Dr. Timothy Dobbin

Christ's Church Cathedral is a cathedral of the Anglican Diocese of Niagara, located at 252 James Street North, in Hamilton, Ontario, Canada. The parish was established in 1835, with construction for the present building taking place from 1852 to 1873. The cathedral has gone through several expansions and renovations since its opening in 1876.

== History ==
The parish was established by John Geddes, then the Dean of Niagara, in 1835. The parish's present building was built from 1852 to 1873.

In 1872, the original church facade was demolished for the building of a new cathedral. The new building was elevated to the status of cathedral and formally opened in 1876.

In 2003, Dean Peter Wall performed a wedding for a lesbian couple, whilst the national church was still in the process of debating the blessing of same-sex unions. The Diocesan Synod also had yet to reach any conclusion on the matter, with Bishop Ralph Spence expressing disapproval of the Dean's decision to officiate the wedding. The Diocesan Synod approved the blessing of same-sex unions in 2004. Because of the event, the parish is regarded as queer-friendly by Anglican and Episcopalian LGBT+ advocacy organisation, Integrity.

== Design ==
Originally a stuccoed wooden Palladian-Baroque structure designed by Robert Charles Wetherall, it was incrementally transformed into stone Decorated Gothic, initially to an 1848 design by William Thomas, with Thomas's chancel and the first two bays of his nave being added to Wetherall's existing wooden church, the resulting hybrid being dubbed "the humpback church."

In 1872, the original wooden portion was demolished to make room for renovations to the church. The stone gothic nave was completed to a further design by Henry Langley (the architect of some 70 Ontario churches) in 1876, and, inter alia, the chancel extended in 1924–25.

Meanwhile, Thomas, in a state of indignation over the perverse use to which the Anglicans had put his design, took it to the Presbyterians, who built the still-standing St Paul's Church to Thomas's plan for Christ's Church.

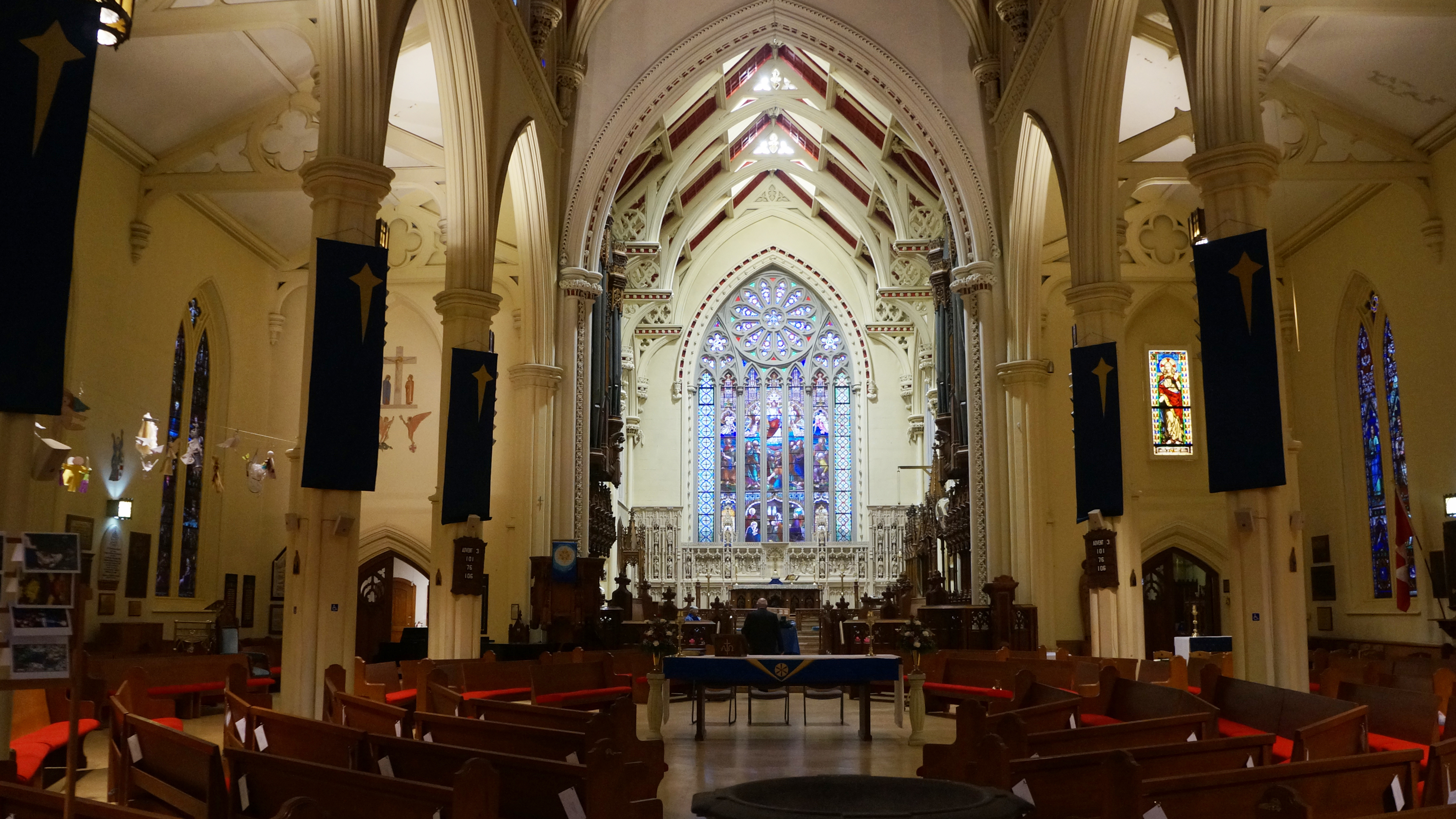
Stained-glass windows behind the altar of the cathedral

Christ's Church has ornately carved west doors and fine stained glass windows.

== Music and arts ==
The cathedral is a notable arts, concert, recital and recording venue in Hamilton. Its Gallery 252, operated by the cathedral's arts committee, mounts monthly exhibitions of oils, pastels, charcoal drawings, photography, silk screening and stitchery as a means of introducing to the public artists not yet sufficiently established for commercial galleries. Since 2008, the New Harbours Music Series has organized free public concerts which coincide with the monthly art crawl on James street, including performances from Polmo Polpo, Orphx, Michael Snow, Slither, Steve Hauschildt, Dirty Beaches, Slim Twig, Gasoline Gathers Hands Gathers Friends, Sun Circle, and Jeremy Greenspan.

== See also ==
- Dean of Niagara
