= Tim Matthews (bishop) =

Canadian Anglican bishop

The Right Reverend Tim Matthews
- bishop of Quebec
- Archdiocese: Anglican
- Province: Canada
- Diocese: Quebec

Orders
- Ordination: 1933
- Consecration: 1971

Personal details
- Born: July 8, 1907
- Died: September 12, 1991 (aged 84)

Timothy John Matthews (1907–1991) was the ninth Bishop of Quebec.

He was educated at Bishop's College School and Bishop's University, Lennoxville and ordained in 1933. After curacies at Viking and Edson in Alberta he held incumbencies at Coaticook and Lake St John. He was Archdeacon of Gaspé from 1952 to 1957; and then of St Francis until his elevation to the episcopate in 1971. He resigned his see in 1977.

== See also ==
- List of Bishop's College School alumni

Religious titles
Preceded by Russel Brown	Bishop of Quebec; 1971 – 1977	Succeeded by Allen Goodings
