= Lewis Broughall =

Canadian Anglican bishop

Lewis Wilmot Bovell Broughall was a Canadian Anglican bishop in the first half of the 20th century.

Born on 27 March 1876, the son of Abraham James Broughall and Georgina Harriet Hurd and educated at the University, Toronto and ordained in 1899. After a curacy in Minden he was the incumbent at Hagersville and then Rector of Oakville. In 1925 he became Dean of Niagara and in 1932 its diocesan bishop. He retired in 1949 and died on 26 August 1958.
