= Royal Canadian Chaplain Service =

Unified chaplaincy branch of the Canadian Armed Forces

- Service de l'aumônerie royal canadien
- Active: 1969–present
- Country: Canada
- Branch: Canadian Armed Forces
- Type: Military chaplain
- Mottos: Pre-2006: In hoc signo vinces (Latin for 'In this sign you will conquer'); Since 2006: Vocatio ad servitium (Latin for 'A call to serve')
- March: "Ode to Joy"

Commanders
- Current commander: Colonel Lisa Pacarynuk (as Chaplain General), Brigadier-General Stéphane Racle (as Director General, Military Personnel Chaplain Division)

The Royal Canadian Chaplain Service (French: Service de l'aumônerie royal canadien) is a personnel branch of the Canadian Armed Forces that has approximately 264 Regular Force chaplains and 135 Reserve Force chaplains representing the Christian, Muslim and Jewish, Buddhist and Indigenous faiths. From 1969 to 2014 it was named the Chaplain Branch. It was renamed on October 16, 2014.

== Mission and vision ==
The mission of this branch is to "support and enhance the effectiveness of the CF as a whole – its leadership, the individual men and women who serve and their families – through the provision of comprehensive religious and spiritual support, advice, and care."

The vision of the Chaplaincy is to "be an operationally relevant Chaplaincy that supports and cares for all CF personnel and their families, wherever they live and serve, empowering them spiritually and morally to meet the demands of military service."

== Role ==
- Foster the religious, spiritual and moral well-being of members and their families
- Offer a ministry of presence in a multitude of environments (at home and abroad)
- Participate in the life of the worshipping community
- Officiate at special functions
- Advise the commanding officer regarding the spiritual and ethical well-being and morale of their unit
- Liaise with civilian religious faith groups
- Collaborate with other care providers
- Provide directed care after critical incidents

== Leading prayer ==
In accordance with their role, chaplains offer prayer services at home and abroad. Some services are inherently religious, such as Sunday worship, baptisms or religious funerals and burial at sea ceremonies. Other times, chaplains may offer a prayer for secular occasions such as base divisions, changes of command, mess dinners or ship commissioning ceremonies. Before offering prayers during parades and ceremonies, it is customary that the order to remove headdress be given to those on parade. In November 2004, Court Martial Appeal Court of Canada ruled that this order was "not lawful" since it unjustifiably required all attendees to show participation in a prayer that they may not believe. Following this ruling, non-Christians are now permitted to retain their headdress, just like Jews and Sikhs do in accordance with their faith.

== Training ==
=== Canadian Forces Chaplain School and Centre ===
The Canadian Forces Chaplain School and Centre (CFChSC) in Borden, Ontario, is responsible for the training of all chaplains (Regular and Reserve, Protestant, Roman Catholic, Muslim and Jewish). CFChSC provides training in operational and static ministry. The training is provided with an operational focus and an interfaith approach. Courses are available in both official languages English and French. Courses include Chaplain Basic Officer Training, Ethics, Pastoral Counselling, Chaplains in Deployed Operations, Intermediate, Advanced, Chapel Life Coordinator (Protestant and Roman Catholic), and Ministry in a Pluralistic Environment. CFChSC prepares military chaplains for service in times of peace and times of conflict. The Resource Centre contains a library relating to ministry, religion and related areas. The Chaplains provide ministry to Canadian Forces personnel and their families.

== Annual Royal Canadian Chaplain Service Exercise ==
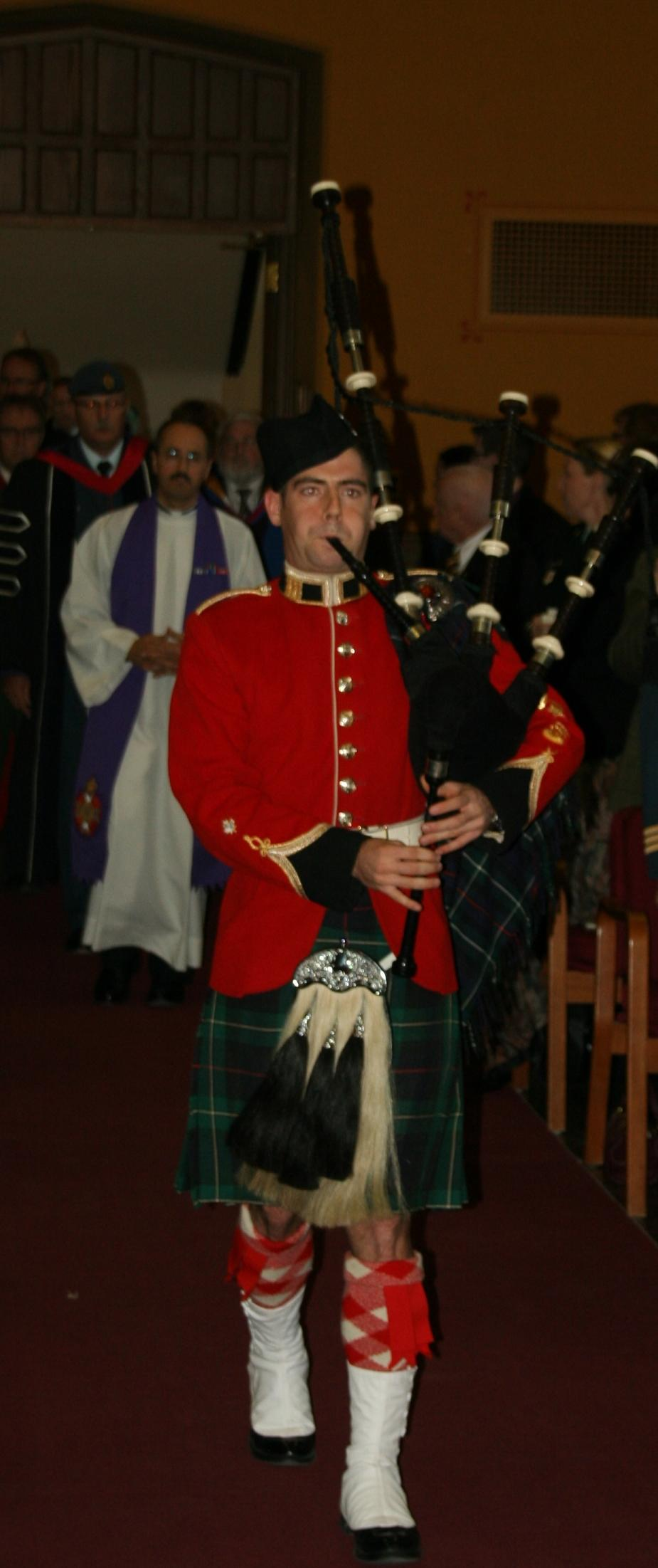
Bag piper, Padre, Currie Hall, Royal Military College of Canada

Since the amalgamation of the former Protestant and Roman Catholic Chaplaincies in the mid-1990s into a single multi-faith Canadian Forces Chaplaincy, a joint exercise. Consisting of seminars, business meetings and worship services, the annual exercise provides opportunities for the professional and spiritual development of chaplains and for fellowship as a Branch. The Annual Protestant Chaplain Branch Retreat and Seminar was held annually at the Royal Military College of Canada in Kingston, Ontario, in the late 1980s and 1990s.

== Badges ==
On 24 September 2006, the Department of National Defence issued a press release indicating that, "[i]n order to better represent the diversity of Canadian society, and reflect the multi-faith nature of today’s chaplaincy", the current branch cap badge would be replaced with three new badges. The new badges would retain the crowned wreath of red maple leaves and central blue circle; the Maltese Cross behind the circle would be removed. On the circle would be "a different symbol for each faith tradition: for Christian chaplains, the Maltese cross, which has long been associated with Christian chaplaincy. Jewish chaplains will wear the symbol of the tablets of the Law and the Magen David (the star of David) and Muslim chaplains will wear the crescent." A scroll with the motto vocatio ad servitium would be placed below the circle. These badges were approved by the Canadian Heraldic Authority on 15 March 2006.

== Chaplain general ==
The current Chaplain General is Colonel Lisa Pacarynuk, who assumed the role on May 16, 2025. She was appointed alongside Stéphane Racle, as Director General, Military Personnel Chaplain Division who will undertake the overseeing the efficient and coordinated operation of all chaplaincy-related functions in the military, focusing on staffing, training, resources, policy development, and operational support to military personnel.

== Order of precedence ==
Preceded by Corps of Royal Canadian Electrical and Mechanical Engineers	Royal Canadian Chaplain Service	Succeeded by Canadian Forces Military Police

== See also ==
- Armed Forces Chaplaincy Center (U.S. chaplain training)
- Military Ordinariate of Canada
- Royal Canadian Army Chaplain Corps
- Royal Military College of Canada chapels

== Gallery ==
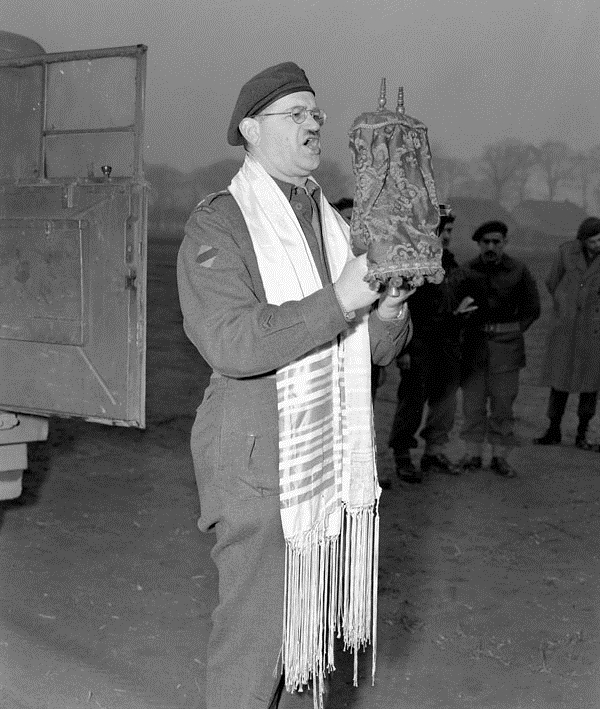
Captain Samuel Cass, a rabbi, conducting the first prayer service celebrated on German territory by Jewish personnel of the First Canadian Army near Cleve, Germany, 18 March 1945

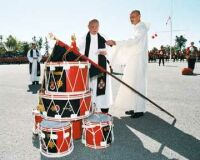
During a military-religious flag Consecration ceremony, Canadian Forces chaplains bless the Royal Military College of Canada Colours, which lean on top of a stack of College drums on a platform

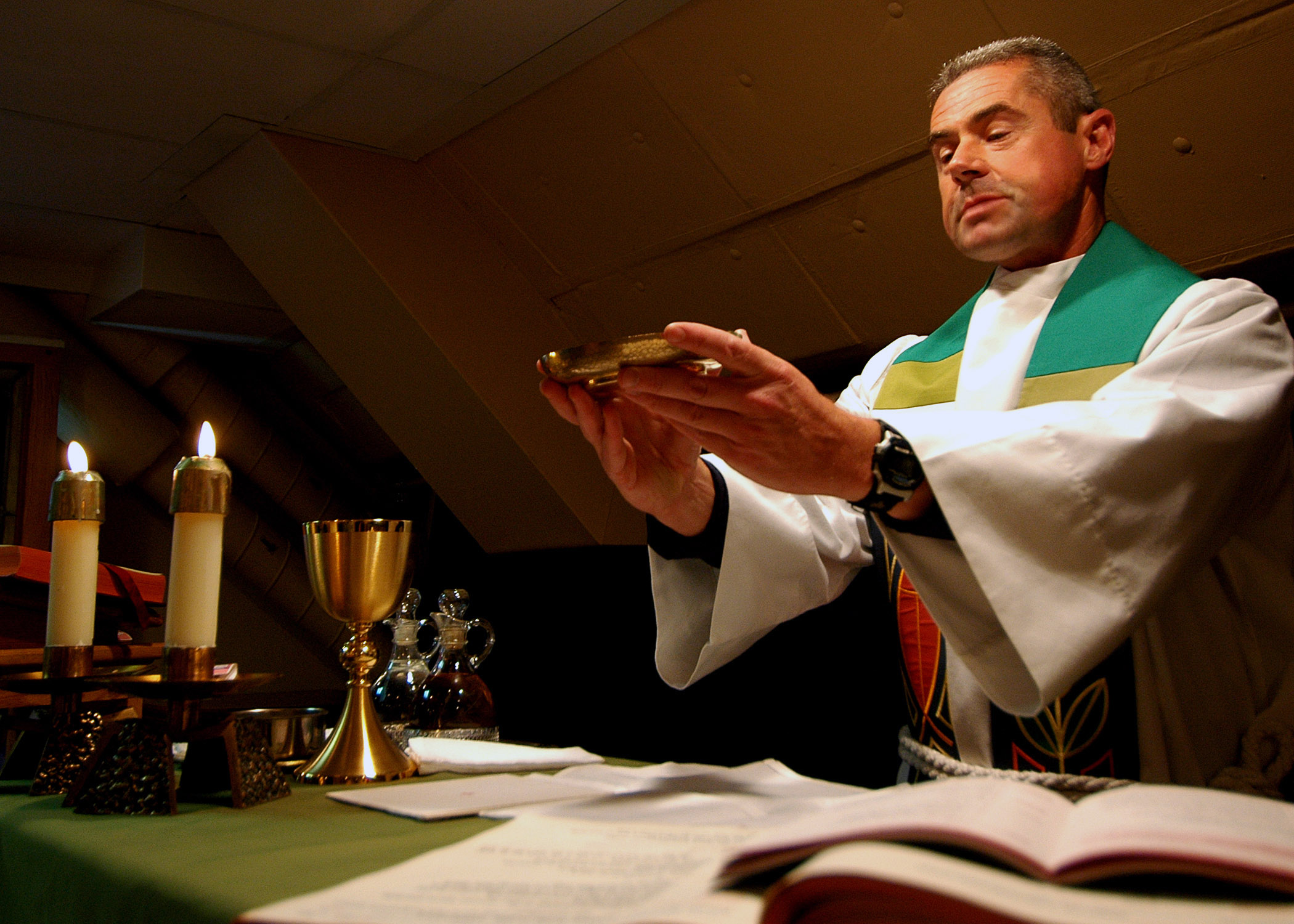
Capt. Rory MacDonald, Canadian Forces chaplain, holds Catholic Mass.jpg

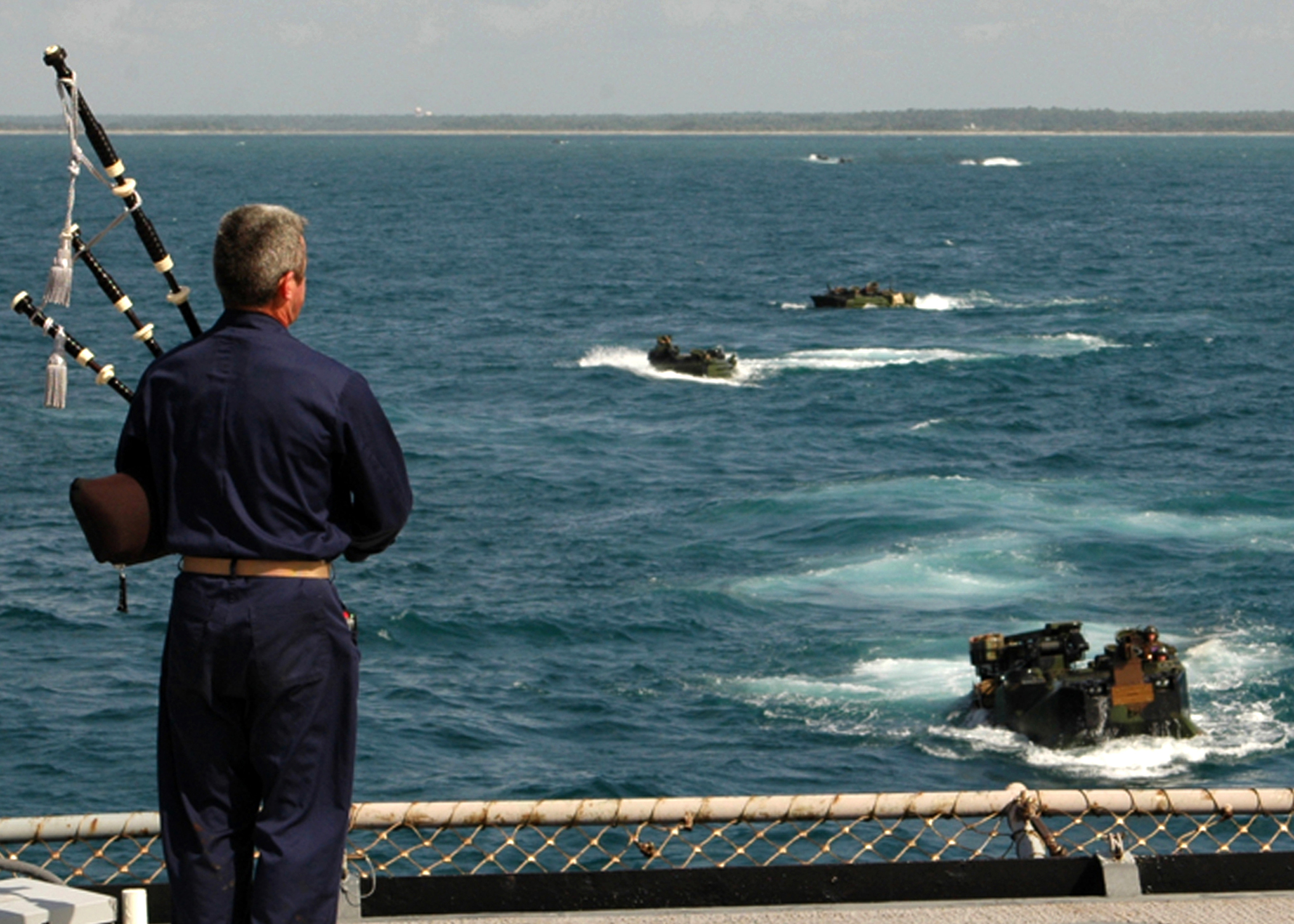
Capt. Rory Macdonald, Canadian Forces chaplain, plays the bagpipe to welcome aboard the amphibious assault vehicles and Marines.jpg

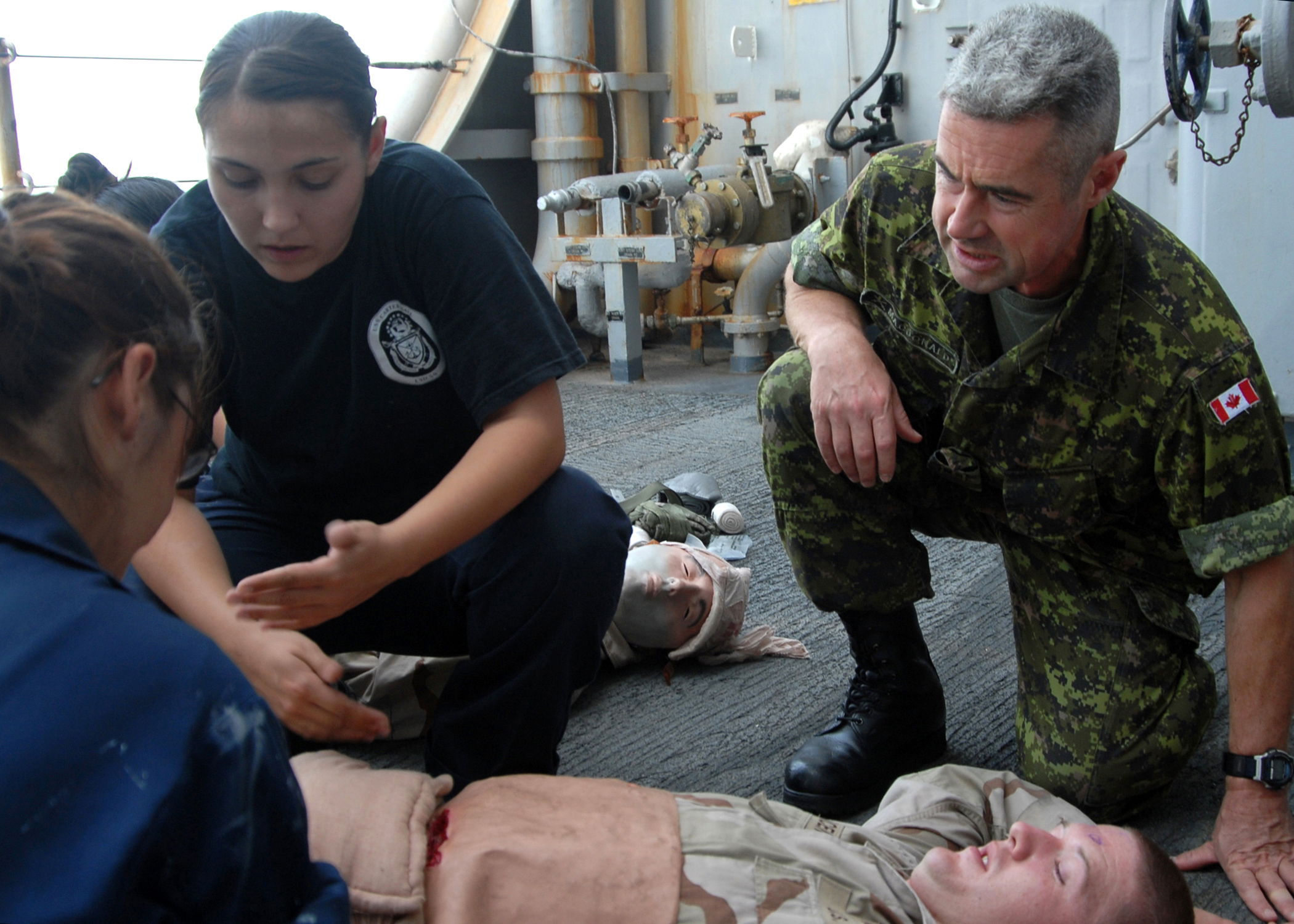
Capt. Rory MacDonald, Canadian Forces chaplain, comforts a simulated victim.

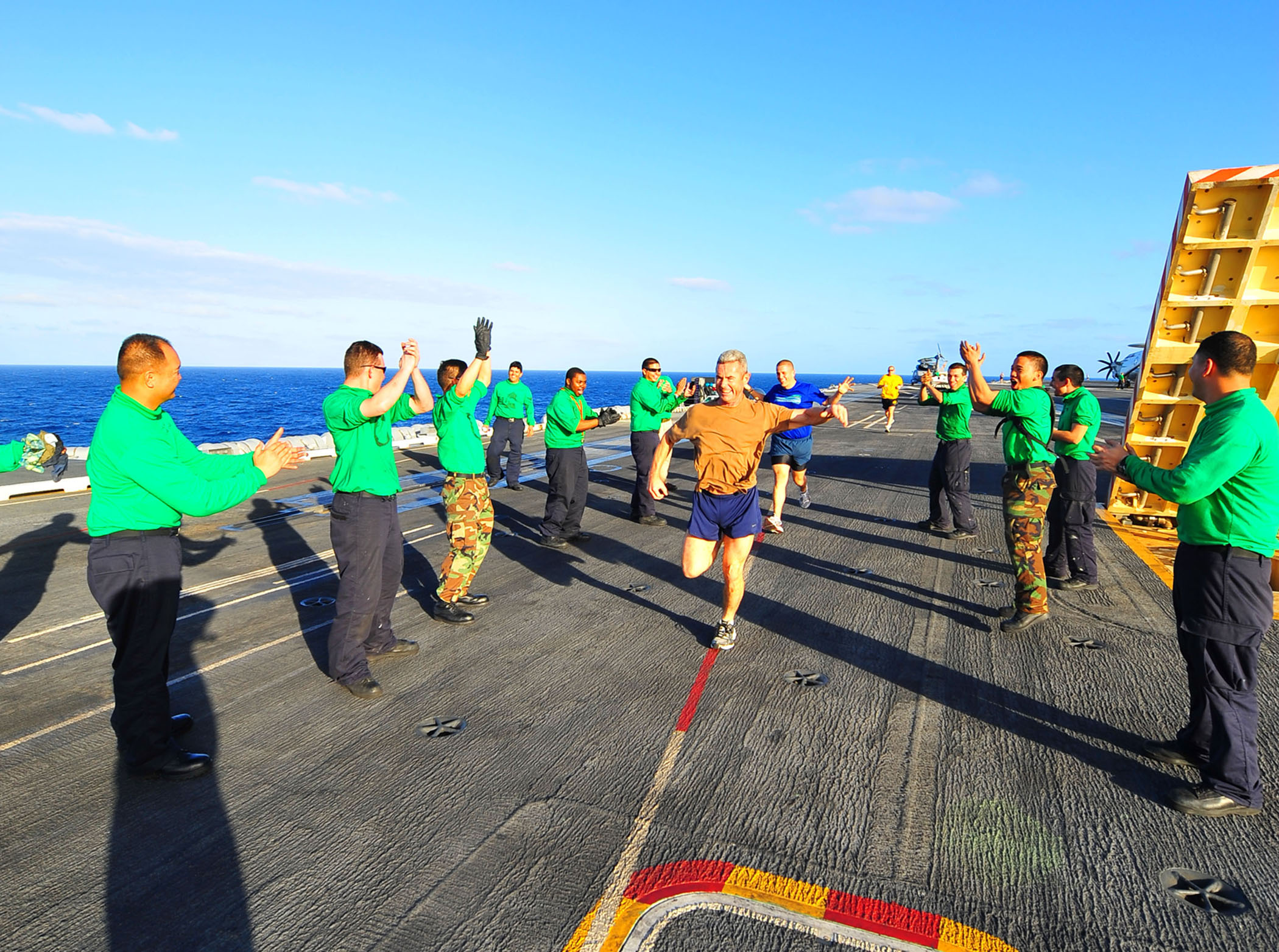
Capt. Rory Macdonald, Canadian Forces chaplain, runs aboard a nuclear-powered aircraft carrier.
