= John Geddes (dean of Niagara) =

John Gamble Geddes, D.C.L. (March 29, 1811; November 16, 1891) was a Canadian Anglican priest in the 19th century.

Geddes was educated at King's College, Toronto. Ordained in 1835, his first post was at St George, Kingston, ON. After a spell at Three Rivers he held incumbencies in Hamilton, Ontario and Tatsfield, Kent, England. He was Dean of Niagara from 1875 until his death in 1891.
