= Bruce Myers (bishop) =

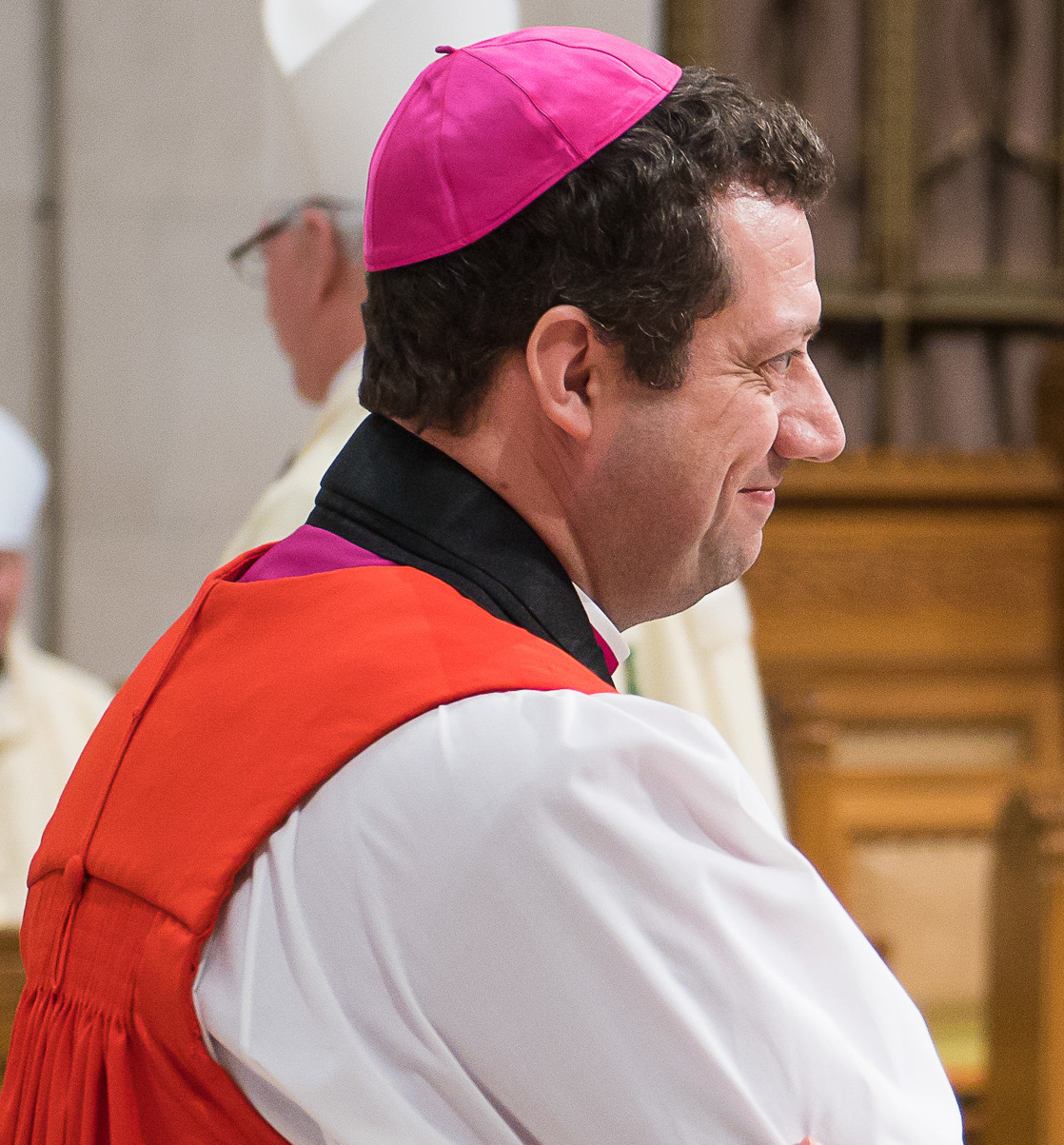
The Right Reverend Bruce Myers

Bruce Joseph Andrew Myers OGS (born December 16, 1972), is the thirteenth Bishop of Quebec, having been installed in 2017.

Born the fifth and youngest child of Charles Harry Myers (1932–2003) and Marion Beverly Coleman (1938–), Myers has four older siblings, Tracy Lee, Charles Edward, Lesley-Anne (Gold), and Gary. Myers was educated at the University of Toronto. After a decade as a journalist with CJAD he was ordained in 2004. He served at Quebec City and Îles-de-la-Madeleine before his election as bishop.

Anglican Communion titles
Preceded by Dennis Drainville	Bishop of Quebec; 2017–	Succeeded by Incumbent
