= Walter Brown (chaplain) =

Canadian military chaplain

Walter Leslie Brown
- Born: August 13, 1910; Peterborough, Ontario, Canada
- Died: June 6, 1944 (aged 33) near Caen, Normandy, France
- Occupation(s): Anglican Minister and later Chaplain in the Canadian Army

The Reverend Walter Leslie Brown (13 August 1910 – 6 June 1944) was a Canadian military chaplain who was attached to the Sherbrooke Fusilier Regiment, 2nd Canadian Armoured Brigade during Operation Overlord. He was murdered by Waffen-SS soldiers after he had surrendered. At the time of his capture he had been wearing the uniform of a Canadian army chaplain.

== History ==
Walter Brown was born in Peterborough, Ontario on 13 August 1910, to English-born parents George Carmichael Brown and Florence May Brown (née Peters), although the family later settled in Orillia, Ontario. He had two brothers.

An alumnus of Huron University College, he was already an ordained and practising minister of the Anglican Church in Canada, before he volunteered for service in the Canadian Army as part of the Canadian Chaplain Service on 1 April 1941 in Toronto, Ontario. He was eventually attached to an armoured regiment (the 27th Armoured Regiment (The Sherbrooke Fusilier Regiment)) slated to land early on D-Day and he was therefore one of the first Canadian Military Chaplains to land in Normandy on Juno Beach on 6 June 1944. Walter Brown was murdered (by bayonetting), after surrendering to members of the 12th SS Panzer Division Hitlerjugend on 6 June. He was the only allied military chaplain to suffer this fate, although several were killed and wounded in action in World War II. The Hitlerjugend Waffen SS were notoriously brutal and murdered several Canadian Prisoners of War in the early stages of the Normandy Campaign.

His body was eventually recovered on 11 July 1944 and he was buried along with other Canadian servicemen in the Bény-sur-Mer Canadian War Cemetery in Normandy, France. Walter Brown was awarded the following medals posthumously: the Canadian Volunteer Service Medal, the War Medal, the Defence Medal and the France and Germany Star. The medals were passed to his parents.

== See also ==
- Royal Canadian Army Chaplain Corps
- Military chaplain
- Kurt Meyer
- First Canadian Army
