= Harold Bagnall =

Canadian Anglican priest

Harold Robert Bagnall was a Canadian Anglican priest in the 20th century.

Bagnall was ordained in 1948. After a curacy in Saint-Martin, Quebec he was Rector of Welland from 1952 to 1960; and then of St. Catharines until 1963. He was Dean of Niagara from 1963 to 1973; and Archdeacon of Niagara from 1973.
