= Charles Riley (priest) =

Canadian Anglican priest

Charles Edward Riley, D.D. (b. Liverpool May 21, 1883 – Toronto April 16, 1972) was a Canadian Anglican priest in the first two thirds of the 20th century.

Riley was educated at McGill University. Ordained in 1910, his first post was at McNab, Ontario. He was held the incumbencies at Hamilton, Dundas, Oakville and St. Catharines. He was Dean of Niagara from 1933 to 1937; and Dean of Toronto from then until 1961.
