= Knut Stensholm =

Norwegian drummer

Knut Ragnar Stensholm (6 April 1954 – 15 July 2010) was a Norwegian drummer. He was a member of Sambandet, Åge Aleksandersen's backing band, from 1978 until the band was dissolved in 1987. Among other things, he contributed to the highly successful 1984 album Levva Livet. Later he also played with the band Valley Boys together with Hans Rotmo. He died in July 2010 after a long period of illness.
