= Dennis Drainville =

Canadian politician

The Right Reverend Dennis Paul Drainville
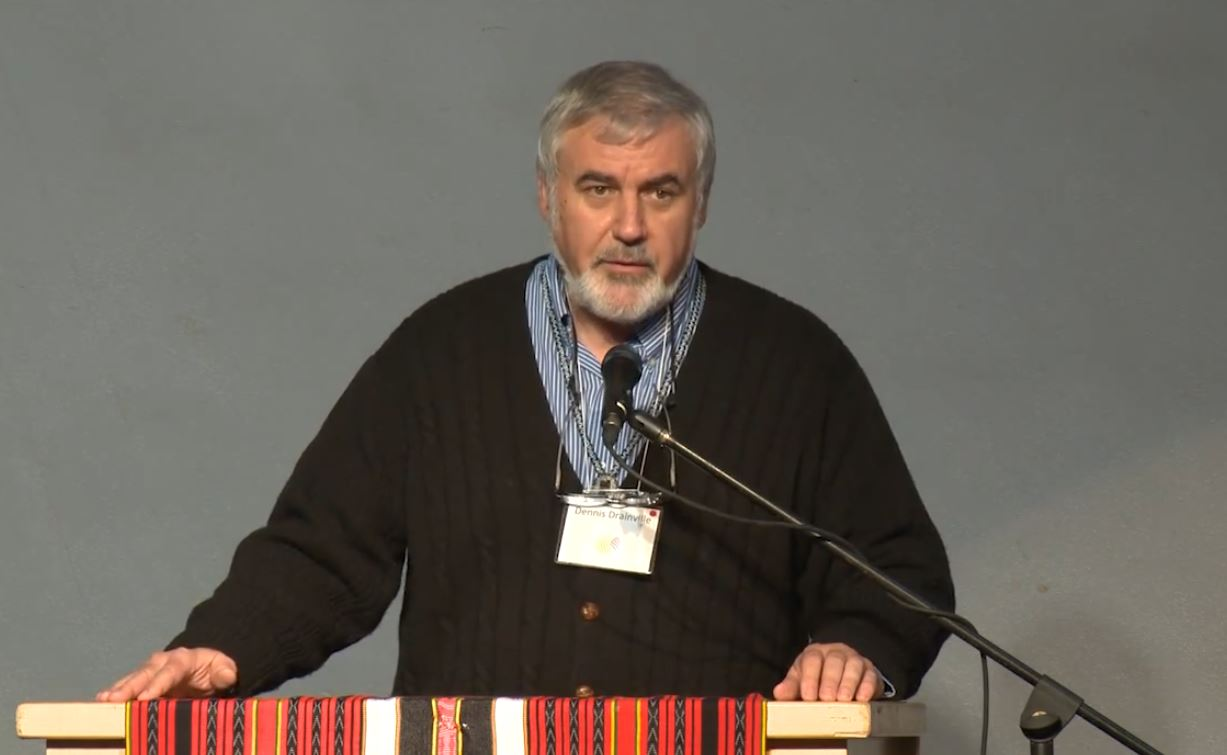

12th Anglican Bishop of Quebec
- In office 2009–2017
- Preceded by: Bruce Stavert
- Succeeded by: Bruce Myers

Ontario MPP
- In office 1990–1993
- Preceded by: John Eakins
- Succeeded by: Chris Hodgson
- Constituency: Victoria—Haliburton

Personal details
- Born: February 20, 1954 (age 72) Joliette, Quebec, Canada
- Party: New Democratic
- Other political affiliations: Ontario Liberal (1977–1989); Ontario New Democratic (1989–1993); Independent (1993–1997); Green (2019-2026)
- Education: University of Toronto
- Occupation: Teacher

Dennis Paul Drainville (February 20, 1954 - August 3, 2026) was a Canadian retired bishop, educator and politician. He was a member of the Legislative Assembly of Ontario from 1990 to 1993; later taught humanities and history for 12 years at the Cégep de la Gaspésie et des Îles and was the Anglican Bishop of the Diocese of Quebec from 2009 to 2017. He was the Green Party of Canada candidate in Gaspésie—Les Îles-de-la-Madeleine for the 2019 Canadian federal election.

== Ontario politics ==
Drainville first ran for the Ontario legislature in the 1977 provincial election. He was a member of the Liberal Party at the time and campaigned in the downtown Toronto riding of Riverdale. He finished a distant third against the winner, Jim Renwick of the New Democratic Party.

Drainville later joined the NDP and, in 1989, was arrested for protesting the province's clearcutting practices in the Northern Ontario forests around Temagami. He also stood with Chief Gary Potts and the Teme-Augama Anishnabai people in their 60-year legal battle to claim their lands in Temagami. He was fined and sent to jail in North Bay for a week in March 1991. He served three days in jail.

Drainville was the NDP candidate in the riding of Victoria—Haliburton in the 1990 provincial election. This east-central Ontario seat was not regarded as winnable – indeed, no NDP candidate in the riding had ever finished higher than third place, behind the Liberals and Progressive Conservatives. However, the NDP under Bob Rae won an unexpected majority government in the election, and Drainville won the riding by 6,520 votes over his nearest opponent.

Drainville served as a parliamentary assistant from 1990 to 1992, and as NDP Caucus chair from 1992 to 1993. Drainville's most high-profile role in the NDP Government was as Chair of the Select Committee on Ontario in Confederation. He oversaw a massive constitutional consultation process during the Charlottetown Accord negotiations.

Eventually his loyalty to the Rae government became increasingly tenuous. Drainville emerged as an ally of Peter Kormos in the NDP caucus, and frequently opposed the policies of the Rae government from a left-wing perspective. On April 28, 1993, he resigned from the NDP caucus to protest the Rae government's decision to bring casinos into the province. He continued to sit in the legislature as an independent. Later in the year, he voted against the Rae government's "Social Contract" legislation.

== Federal politics ==
Drainville resigned from the legislature on September 27, 1993, and declared himself an independent candidate in the 1993 federal election. He finished a distant fourth against Liberal John O'Reilly in the federal Victoria—Haliburton riding, though he did outpoll the official NDP candidate by over a thousand votes.

Drainville later realigned himself with the federal NDP, and worked within the Quebec wing. He ran as an official NDP candidate in the 1997 election in the Quebec riding of Bonaventure—Gaspé—Îles-de-la-Madeleine—Pabok, but again finished a distant fourth with only 649 votes. Despite losing the election, he continued to speak and write publicly about social issues and electoral reform.

== Quebec politics ==
Drainville was elected to the City Council of the Ville de Percé for two four year terms representing sector 7 of that municipality from 1994 to 2002. He also served as President of Seacoast Publications which publishes the only English Newspaper East of Quebec City from 1994 to 1995. In 2004 he founded and became a Trustee of the Gaspé Ecumenical Chaplaincy Foundation established to respond to the social health and spiritual needs of seniors on the Gaspé coast.

== Church work ==
Ordination history of Dennis Drainville
History
Diaconal ordination
- Ordained by: Allan Read
- Date: May 30, 1982
- Place: St. George's Cathedral, Kingston, Ontario
Priestly ordination
- Ordained by: Allan Read
- Date: May 6, 1983
- Place: St. George's Cathedral, Kingston, Ontario
Episcopal consecration
- Date: January 18, 2008
- Place: Cathedral of the Holy Trinity, Quebec City, Quebec

Ordained in 1982 to the diaconate and 1983 to the priesthood, Drainville served as the priest of Land O’Lakes parish in the Diocese of Ontario and as executive director of STOP 103, a non profit multi-service agency responding to the needs of the poor and marginalized in the downtown core of Toronto. He was appointed as associate priest of Christ Church Cathedral and Anglican chaplain of McGill University in Montreal and afterward, became the priest of the parish of Fenelon Falls and Coboconk in the Diocese of Toronto. He left that position and was elected to the Legislative Assembly of Ontario in 1990.

== Work in education ==
Drainville began teaching in the CEGEP system in September 1994 at the College de la Gaspésie et des Îles. Over a 12-year period he taught English, drama, history and humanities. He became the tenured teacher of humanities in 2002. He also served on the executive of the teachers' union the Federation Autonome Collegial 1995–1996.

== Anglican bishop ==
On October 12, 2007, while he was serving as Archbishop's Missioner in the Diocese of Quebec, Drainville was elected coadjutor bishop of the diocese at a special electoral synod. He was ordained to the episcopate on January 18, 2008. He became diocesan bishop on the retirement of Archbishop Bruce Stavert, in 2009. On May 5, 2016, Bruce Myers was consecrated as bishop and became coadjutor bishop and automatic successor to Drainville.
