= Stewart Houston (priest) =

Canadian Anglican priest

Stewart Houston was a Canadian Anglican priest in the second half of the 19th century and the first decades of the 20th.

Houston was educated at Trinity College, Toronto. Ordained in 1859, he was a missionary at Mount Forest, Ontario until 1866; and then at Waterdown until 1878. He was then Rector of Niagara Falls until 1909;Archdeacon of Niagara from 1894 and Dean from 1902. He died on 9 October 1911.
