= Lennox Williams =

Canadian Anglican bishop

Lennox Waldron Williams (12 November 1859 – 8 July 1958) was an eminent Anglican priest, the sixth Bishop of Quebec.
Born into an eminent ecclesiastical family and educated at St John's College, Oxford, he was ordained in 1885. His first post was a curacy at St Matthew's, Quebec after which he was successively Rector, Rural Dean, Dean of Montreal and finally, in 1915, Bishop of Quebec- resigning in 1935.

== Notes ==
Anglican Communion titles
Preceded by Andrew Hunter Dunn	Bishop of Quebec; 1915 – 1935	Succeeded by Philip Carrington

== See also ==
- List of Bishop's College School alumni
