= Joachim Fricker =

Canadian Anglican Suffragan Bishop (1927–2018)

Joachim Carl Fricker (January 12, 1927 – October 28, 2018) was a Canadian Anglican Suffragan Bishop.

Fricker was born in Germany of Swiss ancestry and immigrated to Canada as a child. He was originally raised as a Roman Catholic but became an Anglican. He was educated at the University of Western Ontario and ordained in 1952. After a curacy in Hannon, Ontario he held incumbencies at Welland and Dundas. He was Dean of Niagara from 1973 to 1986; and a suffragan bishop of the Credit Valley in the Diocese of Toronto from 1986 until his retirement in 1993. Fricker was one of the leaders in producing and introducing the Book of Alternative Services.
