= Royal Military College of Canada chapels =

Royal Military College of Canada Chapels
- St-Raphael Roman Catholic chapel; Saint Martin Protestant chapel; Muslim sacred space
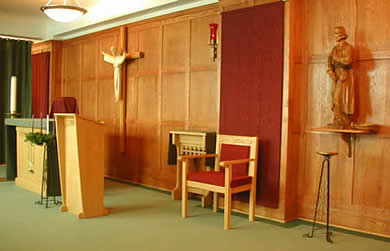
- Chapel, Yeo Hall, Royal Military College of Canada, Kingston, Ontario, Canada
- Royal Military College of Canada Chapels
- 44°13′44″N 76°28′07″W
- Location: Yeo Hall, Royal Military College of Canada, Kingston, Ontario
- Country: Canada
- Denomination: Protestant; Catholic and Muslim

History
- Status: Church within Yeo Hall
- Founded: 1963
- Consecrated: 1963

Architecture
- Heritage designation: Yeo Hall is a recognized Federal Heritage Building on the Registry of Historic Buildings of Canada
- Designated: 1990
- Architectural type: Gothic Revival architecture
- Style: Collegiate Gothic style

Specifications
- Materials: Limestone
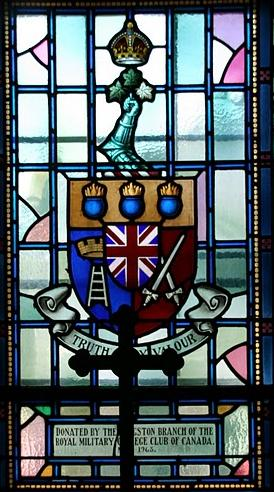

In 2013, the Royal Military College of Canada is celebrating the 50th anniversary of the two small devotional chapels in Yeo Hall, which were installed in 1963. With a view to encourage and enhance their spiritual well-being, the Protestant and Royal Catholic Chaplains, cadets and staff use the Chapels. Gifts to the chapels have been made by successive generations of cadets and ex-cadets.

== History ==
The Roman Catholic congregation had been meeting in Yeo Hall long before it was remodelled into a proper chapel. In 1963, the college padres, Major Johnson and Major Dufour, brought these Chapels into being. The college established the two small devotional chapels in Yeo Hall at the Royal Military College, Kingston. St. Martin's, the Protestant Chapel, which seats 70 persons, was dedicated May 26, 1963. St. Michaels' Roman Catholic Chapel, seating 110, was dedicated December 93, 1963.

Both chapels are panelled with light coloured natural oak. St. Martin's has 6 stained glass windows, including a stained glass knight in armour, the gift of Mrs. Sutherland-Brown and a window beating the College Coat of Arms, the gift of the Kingston Branch of the RMC Club.

St. Martin's has air force blue carpeting and blue altar hangings. The Class of 1938 presented two offertory plates and alms boxes to St. Martin's Chapel.

St. Michael has 6 stained glass windows placed there by General and Mrs. McNaughton, Major-General and Mrs. Panet, Lieutenant- Colonel and Mrs. Gelley, Mrs. Macklem and the Kingston Branch of the RMC Club. The Kingston Branch contributed a stained glass window bearing the College Crest to St. Michael's Roman Catholic Chapel. At night, spotlights on the inside transmit the message of the windows to the campus.

The first baptism to take place at St. Michael's Chapel, the R.C. Chapel occurred on 15 March 1964; Major C. Beaudry, the Area Chaplain baptised Helene Louisa, the baby daughter of No. 3440, Capt. Leo LeBlanc and Mrs. LeBlanc.

Mrs. C. F. Constantine, widow of No. 621, Major-General C. F. Constantine, CB, DSO, a former Commandant of R.M.C., donated in 1966 $3150.00 for religious books for the cadets and a pulpit lamp for St. Martin's Chapel.

The R.M.C. Bible Study Group, which was established in 1954, received official recognition as an activity of the Recreational Club in 1958 under the guidance of Dr. D. H. Rogers and Mr. Claire Woodbury. In 1958, the monthly Supper Meeting was introduced; At the introductory supper meeting, the executive was chosen and Dr. Rogers presented on the life of Dr. H. B. Sharman, the originator of the bible study method used at RMC. The group learned more about Christianity by studying the Gospel Scriptures using the scientific approach; examining the various passages for their content and implications without the use of preconceived knowledge. The individual's concept of the Bible is given a wider scope since the various opinions of the group, who are not necessarily devout Christians, are discussed. Other supper meetings speakers included Mr. Cleo Buxton, General Secretary of the American Officers Christian Union, the Rev. Desmond Hunt of St. James Church, Kingston, the Rev. W. F. Banister, of Chalmers United Church, Kingston, and the Rev. Harry Robinson of the Church of the Redeemer in Kingston.

The Officers' Christian Union, an international, nondenominational organization composed of officers from all branches of the Armed Forces, had a weekly meeting at the RMC in 1962. The RMC OCU group was led by C. P. Copeland, G. H. Black, Lt. B. Durelle and the RMC Padre, Capt. Johnson. The OCU's mission was of glorifying God and making His word better known throughout the Services by stimulating and encouraging members in prayer, Bible study and Christian witness. Regular evening meetings consisted of prayer and Bible study in an atmosphere of fellowship. During supper meetings, guest presenters gave inspiring addresses and led discussions: Reverend Putnam of St. Andrew's Presbyterian Church; Rev. Robinson of the Church of the Redeemer; Mr. Tyndale, Regional Secretary for the I.V.C.F; Mr. C. W. Burton, General Secretary of the American OCU and Dr. W. R. Smith, professor of philosophy at Bethel College, St. Paul, Minnesota.

== Mission ==
RMCC Chaplain Services Department adhere to the direction of the Chaplain General's office; Minister to our Own, Facilitate the worship of others, Care for all. The department shares in RMCC's intellectual life with guest speakers and forums, regular worship and seasonal celebrations. The department provides opportunities for cadets, faculty, staff community of RMCC to explore, deepen and celebrate their faith; serve those in need; and experience a faith-based community. The department sponsors spiritual and social justice programs, including the celebration of the sacraments, prayer services, spiritual direction, charitable, social, and educational programmes.

== Yeo Hall ==
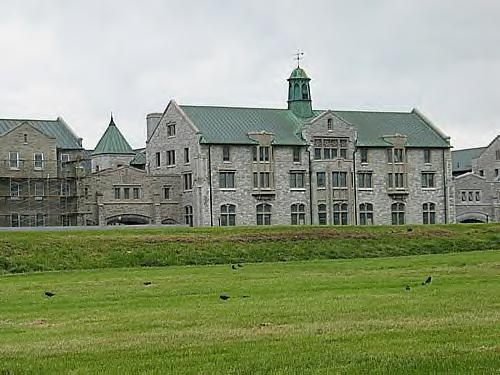
Royal Military College of Canada, Yeo Hall

The chapels are classic examples of gothic revival architecture. Yeo Hall Building 32, the college's historic dining and recreation centre built in 1934–5, was recognized as a Federal Heritage Building in 1990. The building is on the Registry of Historic Places of Canada. Yeo Hall underwent updating and repairs in 1997 by Adamson Associates Architects. The kitchen and dining facilities were expanded, and a second floor addition provides a recreation centre. The basement, which was completely updated, includes band, medical and dental surgical facilities.

=== Memorial Gallery ===
A Memorial Gallery for ex-cadets in the Services who had been killed in the line of duty was established in the corridor outside the Chapels in 1964. A number of stained glass windows were installed in the Memorial hall and at the base of the stairwell. The Class graduating in 1964 presented a stained glass window, "Cadet with Reversed Arms". The Class entering in 1934 donated a stained glass window, "Last Post", in memory of deceased classmates. The Toronto Branch of the R.M.C. Club presented a stained glass window, "RMC and Tri-Service Crests".

== Multifaith Programming ==
The Royal Military College of Canada (RMC) Catholic and Protestant communities normally meet during the academic year in the St-Raphael Roman Catholic chapel and Saint Martin Protestant chapel services from 1030 to 1130. The Muslim community normally meets for prayers in the multi-faith sacred space throughout the week from 1230 hrs to 1530 hrs.

St-Raphael chapel is a place of Catholic denomination worship for Officer cadets, personnel as well as their families. Saint Martin chapel is a place of Protestant denomination worship for Officer cadets, personnel as well as their families.

A sacred space exists to help facilitate the worship or individual reflection of cadets or staff from any (or no) faith perspective. Joanne Benham Rennick writes in `Religion in the Canadian Military: Adapting to an Increasingly Pluralistic Society,` "Public rituals, such as Remembrance Day services, are to be as inclusive as possible and, in recent events, such as the ceremony of the Consecration of the Colours at the Royal Military College in Kingston, the Chaplain General invited members of the Buddhist, Hindu, First Nations, Jewish, and Muslim communities to participate as guests" (DND, 2001a, 2007b; Gorniak, 2001). She goes on to explain "At the Royal Military College in Kingston, chaplains have responded to growing numbers of Muslim personnel by installing a curtain in the Christian chapel to create a mutil faith prayer room. Further, the RMCC chaplain arranged for the installation of footbaths in the washrooms to facilitate ablutions." (Benham Rennick, 2006). In 2002, officer cadets at RMCC held their first-ever official multifaith religious service. At RMCC, the chaplains installed a folding wall to separate the Christian aspects of the room (statues, a lectern, a cross, etc.) from a section containing no imagery for the purposes of prayer/reflection for individuals of a variety of faith perspectives.

The chaplains continue to work with the students and staff at the college to accommodate people of various faith traditions and make their stay at RMCC more pleasant.

== Copper Sunday ==
In a tradition known as Copper Sunday dating to 1882, Officer cadets attend various Kingston churches on the last Sunday of the academic year. While RMCC does not to influence cadets toward any particular religion, the goal is to expose the cadets to the typical processes and procedures of religious ceremony, should they need to carry out Assisting Officer duties in the future. The name comes from the custom of cadets gathering their pennies for collection into the offering plate.

== Baptisms ==
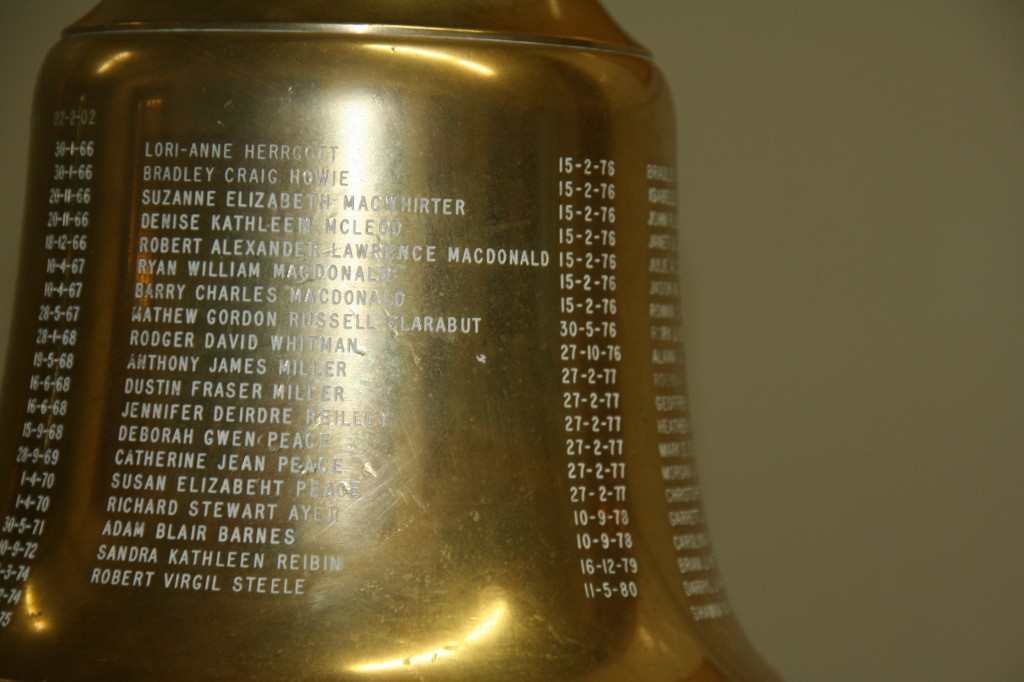
Baptismal font, Chapel, Yeo Hall, Royal Military College of Canada

Following naval tradition, a ship's bell (from the Royal Roads Military College) is used as a baptism font in the college chapel and the names of those baptised are later inscribed on the bell.

== Library ==
The Chapels` library in Yeo Hall contains books on a variety of subjects in Arabic, English, French and Hebrew intended to be used by people of all faiths. As future officers in the Canadian Forces, RMCC students must be well educated about different religions, given that most peacekeeping operations are overseas.

== Stained Glass ==
Robert McCausland Limited: Artists and Craftsmen of Stained Glass since 1856 created a number of stained glass windows in the chapels of the Royal Military College of Canada.

Location	Date	Description	Manufacturer	Inscription	Window
Roman Catholic Chapel	1938	1 light Emblem Lamb of God carrying a flag	Robert McCausland Limited	CNO. 2664, Lt.-Col. J. A. Hilliard, C.D., organizer, To the memory of the class entering in 1938 who gave their lives for Canada.	
Roman Catholic Chapel	1963	1 light Emblem lilies and M	Robert McCausland Limited	General and Mrs. A. G. L. McNaughton, in memory of their son, No. 2588, S/L. Ian G.A. McNaughton, R.C.A.F., Born 6 Nov. 1919 who was killed in action over Germany 22 June 1942 R.I.P.	
Roman Catholic Chapel	1963	1 light Alpha Omega Bible and Torch		Donated by Mrs. Katherine (Kit) Macklem, in memory of her husband, No. 605, Professor Oliver Tiffany Macklem, and of her father, No. 203, Colonel C. William Bermingham	
Roman Catholic Chapel		1 light Dove		Donated by No. 499, Major-General Edouard de B. Panet and Mrs. Marguerite Panet	
Roman Catholic Chapel		1 light Chalice and wheat		Donated by No H6888, Lt.-Col. Thomas Fraser Gelley M.A., LL.D member of faculty, 1919-1963 and Mrs. Gelley	
Roman Catholic Chapel	1963	1 light Alpha Omega Bible and Torch		Donated by Mrs. Oliver Tiffany (Kit) Macklem in memory of her husband no. 605 Oliver Tiffany, and her father no. 203 William Bermingham	
Protestant Chapel	1963	1 light Royal Military College Crest	Robert McCausland Limited	The Kingston Branch of the RMC Club No. 2770, Major K. I. Jefferson, C.D., President, a window showing the full College coat of arms, 26 May 1963.	
Protestant Chapel	1963	1 light Royal Military College Crest	Robert McCausland Limited	Donated by the Kingston branch of the Royal Military College Club of Canada, May 1963.	
Protestant Chapel	1963	1 light Timothy	Robert McCausland Limited	Mrs. Sutherland-Brown donated a window in memory of her son, No. 2609, FXO. Ian Macdonell Sutherland-Brown, who was killed in an airplane accident near Mt. McDougall, Alta, on 14 August 1941.; Inscription:“put on the whole armour of god.” In loving memory of no. 2609 Flight Lieutenant Ian Macdonnell Sutherland-Brown.	
Protestant Chapel	1963	1 light Dove	Robert McCausland Limited	In memory of 4482 Squadron Leader Donald Eaton Galloway Class of 1959	
Protestant Chapel	1963	1 light open book	Robert McCausland Limited	In memory of 6229 Lieutenant John Carson first to leave the Class of 64.	
Protestant Chapel	1963	1 light lamb of God	Robert McCausland Limited	I thank all who loved me in their hearts with love and thanks from mine. 1900 Group Captain Douglas Edwards	
Protestant Chapel	1963	1 light chalice	Robert McCausland Limited	In memory of 10557 Lieutenant Kris K. Gammeljord Class of 1975	
Yeo Hall, Memorial Hall outside chapels	1964	1 light Cadet resting on arms reversed	Robert McCausland Limited	Presented by the graduating class 29 May 1964	100p
Yeo Hall, landing of the main staircase leading to Memorial Hall outside chapels	1964	1 light "RMC and Tri-Service Crests"	Robert McCausland Limited	inscription: "Who would true valour see, let him come hither" Presented by Toronto branch R.M.C. Club of Canada 1964	
Yeo Hall, Memorial Hall outside chapels	1934	1 light Last Post	Robert McCausland Limited	Presented by the class entering RMC in 1934 as a memorial to fallen classmates	
Yeo Hall, Memorial Hall outside chapels	1964	1 light Cadet with Reversed Arms	Robert McCausland Limited	Presented by the graduating class 29 May 1964	100p
St. Andrew's Presbyterian Church (Kingston, Ontario)		1 light Antique window RMC crest and motto		*Royal Military College of Canada stained glass window	

== Commemorative plaques ==
Description	Inscription	Donor
Captain Edward R. Bade 1946-1973 lost in air rescue.	7715 Ted Bade 1968-1969 cadet squadron leader no.5 sqn	presented by his parents September 29, 1974
Captain Bruce Reid 1949–1979	9289 Captain BB Reid killed in aircraft accident at Nellis Air Force Base USA 21 February 1979	presented by his parents 23 November 1980

== Commemorative paintings ==
There are four commemorative paintings of cadets presented by the Jablonowsli family in memory of the four Mackenzie flight cadets, who died in a Cessna plane crash on 24 January 1988. The cadets, who had pilot's licenses, needed to fly regularly to keep up their quota of hours: Ocdt. Scott McMonagle; Ocdt. Dan Richardson; Ocdt. Ray Koebel; Ocdt. Frank Joseph Jablonowski.

== Kingston Churches ==
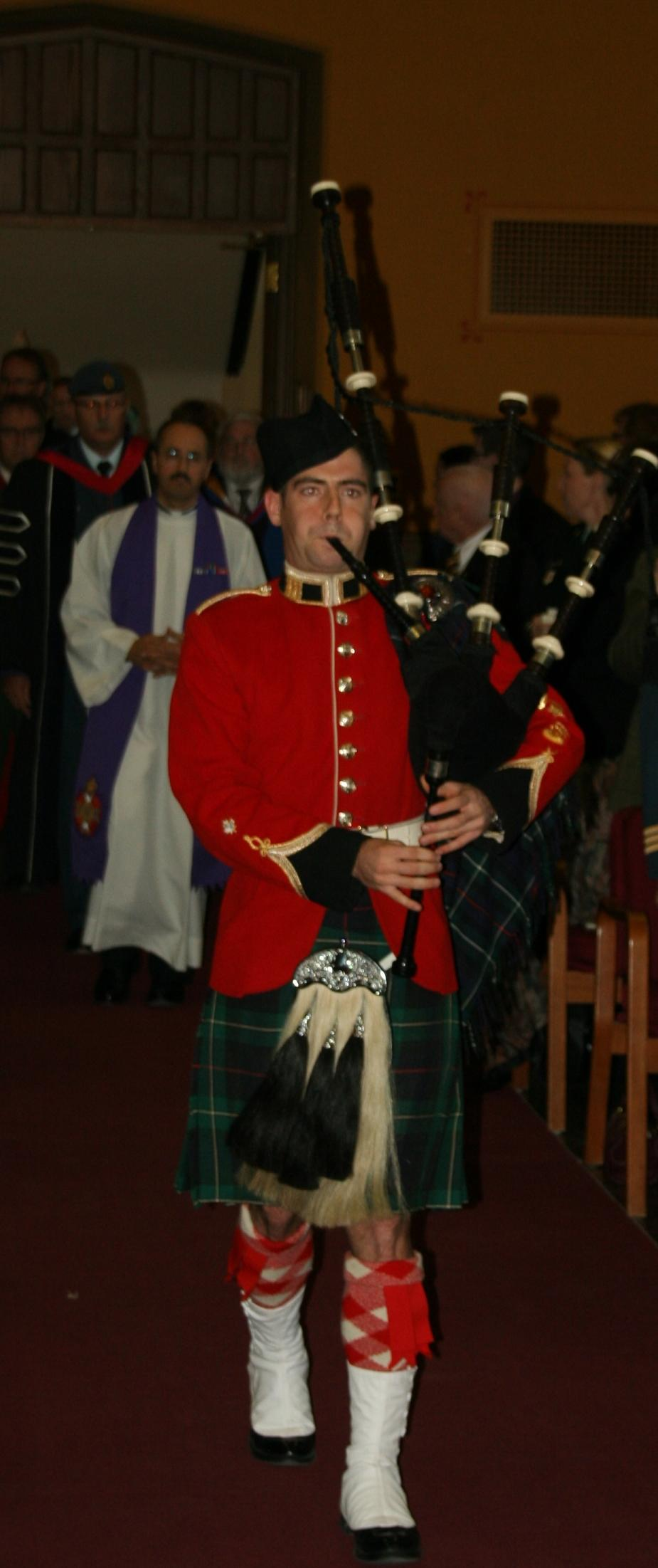
Bag piper, Padre, Currie Hall, Royal Military College of Canada

For many years Royal Military College cadets and other military groups have marched into local churches such as St. George's Cathedral (Kingston, Ontario) for worship on special occasions. A virtual tour the Royal Military College gallery at the Cathedral Church of St. George features stained glass windows of soldier saints including St. George. The most recent windows—the St. Cecilia window and the St. Margaret window—also in the RMC gallery, were installed in 2002 and 2003 respectively.

== See also ==
- Military history of Canada
- History of the Canadian Army
- Canadian Forces
