= Russel Brown =

Canadian Anglican bishop

The Rt Rev Russel Featherstone Brown (also spelled Russell; 7 January 1900 – 7 January 1988) was an eminent Anglican priest, who became the eighth Bishop of Quebec.
He attended the Church of St. John the Evangelist, Montreal and was later educated at Bishop's University, Lennoxville and ordained in 1933. His first post was a curacy at Christ Church Cathedral, Montreal. After this he was Priest in Charge of Fort St. John, British Columbia and then Rector of Sherbrooke until 1954 when he became Archdeacon of Quebec, a post he held until his elevation to the episcopate. After 11 years he resigned to teach in Papua New Guinea. From 1976 he was an assistant bishop of Montreal.
In 2008 a memorial Holy Trinity Anglican Cathedral was unveiled in his honour.

Religious titles
Preceded by Philip Carrington	Bishop of Quebec; 1960 – 1971	Succeeded by Timothy John Matthews
