= Robert Waterman (bishop) =

Canadian Anglican bishop

Robert Harold Waterman (11 March 1894 - 16 December 1984) was a Canadian Anglican bishop in the 20th century.

Waterman was born into an ecclesiastical family, educated at University of Bishop's College, Lennoxville and ordained in 1921.

After a curacy at Bearbrook he held incumbencies at Pembroke and Smith's Falls. He was Dean of Niagara from 1938 to 1948 when he became Bishop Coadjutor of Nova Scotia. He was appointed its full diocesan two years later and retired in 1963.
