= Dean of Niagara =

Anglican dean in Ontario, Canada

The Dean of Niagara is an Anglican dean in the Anglican Diocese of Niagara of the Ecclesiastical Province of Ontario, based at Christ's Church Cathedral in Hamilton, Ontario. The incumbent is also Rector of Christ Church.

The incumbents have been:

Tenure	Incumbent	Notes
1875–1891	John Gamble Geddes	(1811–1891) 1st Dean of Niagara
1902–1911	Stewart Houston
1912–1914	Henry Pryor Almon Abbott	(1881–?)
1915–1924	Derwyn Trevor Owen	(1876–1947) (afterwards Bishop of Niagara,1925, Bishop of Toronto, 1932 and Primate of All Canada)
1925–1932	Lewis Wilmot Bovell Broughall	(1876–1958) (afterwards Bishop of Niagara,1932)
1933–1937	Charles Edward Riley	(1883–1971) Dean of Toronto, 1937–1961
1937–1948	Robert Harold Waterman	(1894–1984) (afterwards Bishop of Nova Scotia,1950)
1948–1949	Walter Edward Bagnall	(1903–1984) (afterwards Bishop of Niagara,1949)
1950–1963	William Ernest Jackson
1963–1973	Harold Robert Bagnall	(1917–2007)
1973–1986	Joachim Carl Fricker
1986–1998	Harry James Dawson
1998–2019	Peter Allan Wall
2021–present	Timothy Dobbin
