= Harry Dawson (priest) =

Dean of Niagara

Harry James Dawson was Dean of Niagara from 1986 until 1998.

Dawson was educated at Bishop's University, Lennoxville and ordained in 1965. After a curacy in St. Catharines he held incumbencies at Acton and Guelph.
