= Christian Schreiner =

Anglican priest, Dean of Quebec

Christian Schreiner has been Dean of Quebec since 2008.

Schreiner began his ecclesiastical career as a youth leader within the Evangelical Lutheran Church in Bavaria. Later he was a sexton, then pastor in Kolbermoor.
