= Richard Lonsdell =

Canadian priest

Richard Lonsdell was a Canadian Anglican priest, most notably the first Archdeacon of St Andrews in the Diocese of Montreal.

MacLean was educated at Bishop's University and ordained in 1840. After a curacy at Kingsey he held incumbencies at La Prairie and Hochelaga.
