= Ernest Jackson (priest) =

Canadian Anglican priest

William Ernest Jackson (called Ernest) was a Canadian Anglican priest in the first two thirds of the 20th century.

Jackson was educated at the University of Saskatchewan. Ordained in 1933, his first post was at Kinistino. After a spell at St. Alban's Cathedral, Prince Albert he held incumbencies in Winnipeg, Calgary and Montreal. He was Dean of Niagara from 1950 to 1963. He became a Doctor of Divinity (DD).
