= Royal Canadian Army Chaplain Corps =

- Active: 1 June 1921–2 May 1969
- Country: Canada
- Branch: Canadian Army
- Type: Administrative corps
- Role: Military chaplaincy
- Motto: In hoc signo vinces (Latin for 'In this sign conquer')
- March: "Onward Christian Soldiers"

The Royal Canadian Army Chaplain Corps (RCAChC) was an administrative corps of the Canadian Army. The Canadian Chaplain Service was first authorized on 1 June 1921. It was later redesignated as The Canadian Army Chaplain Corps on 22 March 1948 and as The Royal Canadian Army Chaplain Corps on 3 June 1948. The Royal Canadian Army Chaplain Corps was succeeded by the Chaplain Branch on May 2, 1969. The official march of the RCAChC was "Onward Christian Soldiers".

== Role ==
Chaplains share the hardships and perils that fall to other service personnel. "It is the business of the regimental padre to be the friend and adviser of the soldier, and the manner in which he has done this business has had more than a little to do with the maintenance of the morale of the army." John Weir Foote, chaplain of the Royal Hamilton Light Infantry, was awarded the Victoria Cross for his bravery under fire in helping care for the wounded and evacuate them from Dieppe. Ten members of the Canadian Chaplains Service are buried in World War 2 Commonwealth War Graves Commission grave plots overseas (three buried in France, two in Belgium, two in the Netherlands, two in Italy and one in the UK).

== Notable Members ==
- Colonel John Macpherson Almond CMG CBE
- Frederick George Scott CMG DSO FRSC
- Lieutenant Colonel John Weir Foote VC CD
- Captain Walter Brown

== Gallery ==
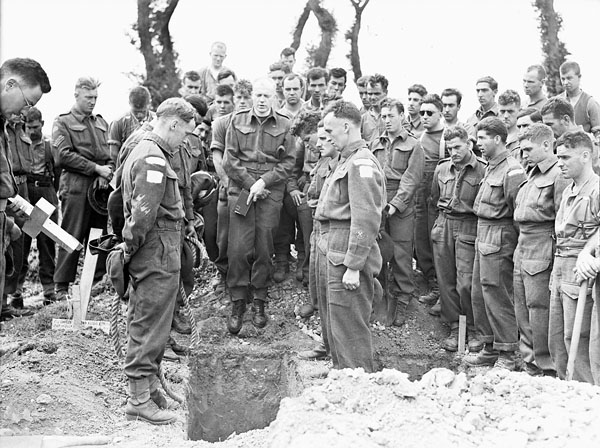
H Captain Callum Thompson, a Canadian chaplain, conducting a funeral service in the Normandy bridgehead, France, 16 July 1944

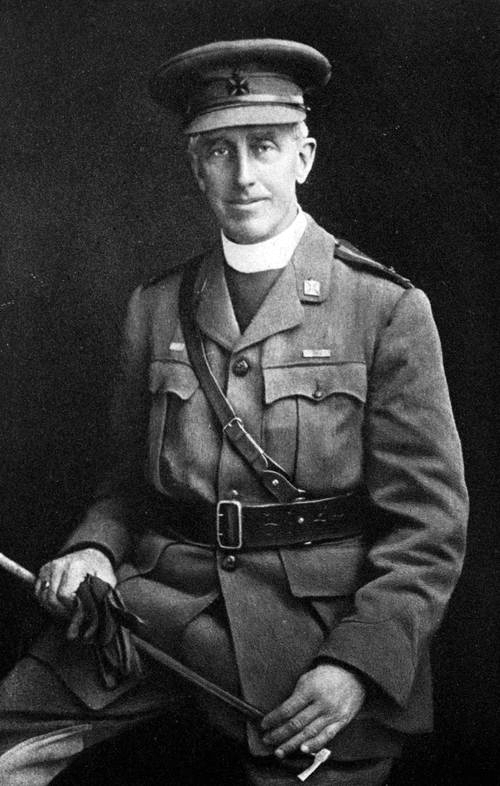
Canon Fred Scott, Senior Chaplain, First Canadian Division, Canadian Expeditionary Force

== Related units ==
This unit was allied with the following:

- Royal Army Chaplains' Department

== See also ==
- Military chaplain
