= John Almond (Archdeacon of Montreal) =

John Almond CMG CBE

Personal details
- Born: August 1, 1871 Shigawake, Quebec, Canada
- Died: September 17, 1939 (aged 68) Montreal, Quebec, Canada
- Occupation: Priest

John Macpherson Almond (1 August 1871 – 17 September 1939) was an Anglican priest in Canada in the first half of the 20th century.

== Biography ==
=== Early life ===
Born in Shigawake, Quebec, Almond was educated at Bishop's University, Lennoxville, where he played hockey and rugby. He was ordained deacon in 1896; and priest in 1897. He was an SPG missionary in Labrador then a curate at Montreal Cathedral.

=== Military Chaplain ===
During the Second Boer War he served as a chaplain with the Royal Canadian Regiment of Infantry. In 1911, he became regimental chaplain for the 6th Duke of Connaught's Royal Canadian Hussars. During the First World War, Almond would become Assistant Director and later Director of the Canadian Chaplain Service with the rank of Honorary Colonel. During his service at the front and with Canadian Military Forces in England, his efforts to improve services and the reputation of Canadian Military Chaplains would allow him to develop a close professional relationship with several senior Canadian commanders, including Lieutenant General Sir Richard Turner and Lieutenant-General Sir Arthur Currie, who appreciated his no-nonsense attitude and his dedication.

=== Later life ===
After further missionary work at Grand-Mère he became the incumbent at Trinity, Montreal. He was Archdeacon of Montreal from 1932 until his death in Montreal in 1939.
