= Peter Wall (priest) =

Canadian Anglican priest

Peter Wall is a Canadian Anglican priest and the retired Dean of Niagara. From October 2022 to January 2024, he has been Interim Dean of Toronto and Priest-in-Charge of the Cathedral Church of St. James.

== Biography ==
Wall was born in Kingston, Ontario, educated at the University of Toronto and ordained in 1989. His first post was as Rector of St. Mark's by the Lake in St. Clair Beach, Ontario. He was Rector of Bishop Cronyn Memorial Church, London, Ontario from 1993 to 1998, he has been Dean of Niagara since then.

He is the father of two children.

Wall sang as a boy, earned his degree at the University of Toronto in voice, and sang professionally with a number of organizations, including the Canadian Opera Company. He taught voice at the University of Western Ontario. As a priest, Wall has continued to sing, performing at charity fundraising events as a member of a vocal trio of three priests that came together in the 1997, the "Three Cantors." The group includes Wall, David Pickett and William Cliff. Wall, who has a "huge bass/baritone voice," has also sung with Symphony Hamilton.

In 1994 he was chosen as the guest speaker at the "healing and memorial service" to commemorate International AIDS Day, a nondenominational service held at All Saints Anglican Church at City Hall Square, Windsor, Ontario.

Wall retired as rector of Christ’s Church Cathedral and Dean of Niagara, effective September 30, 2019. He served the Anglican Church of Canada with distinction for 30 years, with passions for liturgy, stewardship, music and good governance. In Wall's words, “being rector of the Cathedral and dean of this diocese has been a privilege and an honour beyond anything I ever might have dreamed or imagined.”
