= Philip Carrington =

Canadian Anglican bishop and author

Carrington in c1935-44.

Philip Carrington (6 July 1892 – 3 October 1975) was an eminent Anglican priest and author, the seventh Bishop of Quebec and the eleventh Metropolitan of Canada.

Born into an ecclesiastical family and educated at Christ's College, Christchurch and the University of Canterbury, he was ordained in 1919. At first he specialised in work with the Boy Scouts and was then Rector of Lincoln, New Zealand. After this he was Warden of St Barnabas Theological College, North Adelaide then dean of Divinity at Bishop's University, Lennoxville. In 1935 he was elevated to the episcopate and retired in 1960.

== Notes ==
Anglican Communion titles
Preceded by Lennox Williams	Bishop of Quebec; 1935–1960	Succeeded by Russel Brown
Preceded by John Hackenley	Metropolitan of Canada; 1944–1960	Succeeded by John Dixon
