= Allen Goodings =

Canadian Anglican bishop

Allen Goodings (7 May 1925 – 15 December 1992) was the tenth Bishop of Quebec.

He was educated at Sir George Williams University and ordained in 1959. After a curacy at Trinity Memorial Church, Montreal he held incumbencies at St Ignatius Montreal and The Ascension, Montreal. He was Dean of Quebec from 1969 until his appointment to the episcopate in 1977. He resigned his See in 1991.
