= Anglican Diocese of Quebec =

Diocese of the Anglican Church in Canada

Coordinates: 48.17°N 72.90°W

Diocese of Quebec Diœcesis Quebecensis Diocèse de Québec
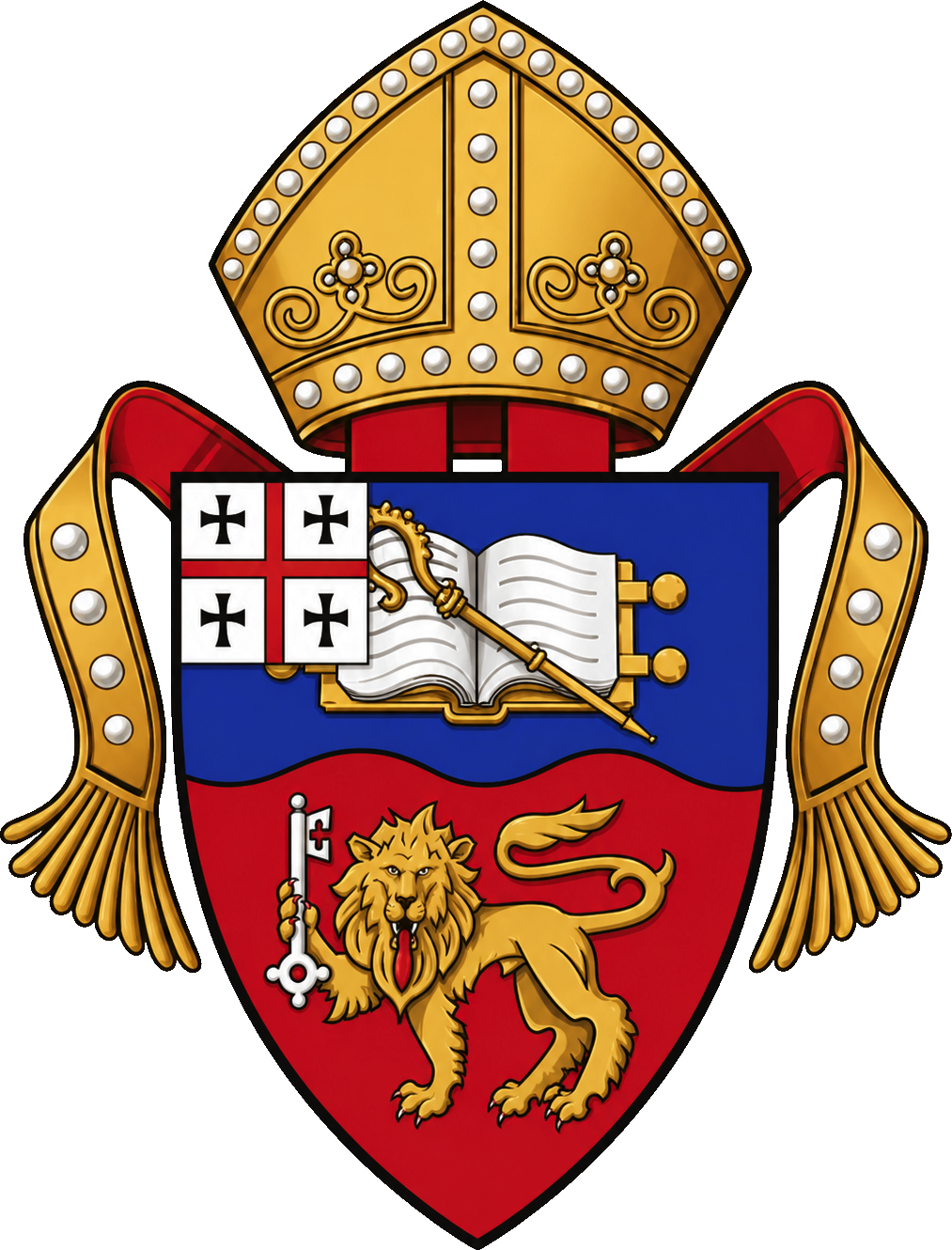
- Coat of arms

Location
- Country: Canada
- Ecclesiastical province: Canada

Statistics
- Area: 720,000 km^{2} (280,000 sq mi)
- Parishes: 65 (2022)
- Members: 1,586 (2022)

Information
- Denomination: Anglican Church of Canada
- Established: 1793
- Cathedral: Holy Trinity Anglican Cathedral

Current leadership
- Bishop: Bruce Myers

Map
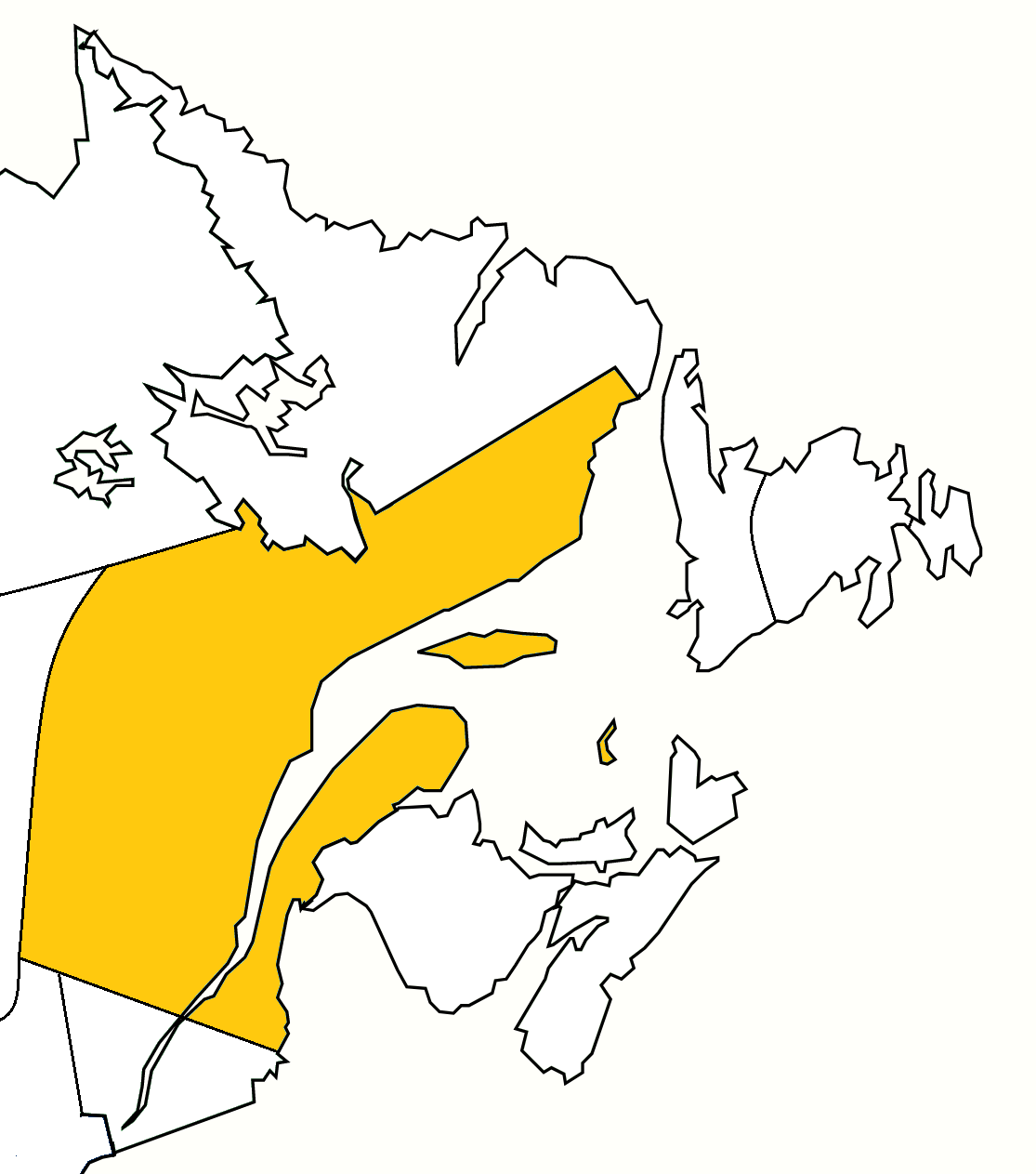
- Boundaries of the diocese within the Ecclesiastical Province of Canada

Website
- quebec.anglican.org

The Anglican Diocese of Quebec is a diocese that forms a part of the Ecclesiastical Province of Canada of the Anglican Church of Canada, in turn a province of the Anglican Communion.

The diocese is located in the eastern portion of the civil province of Quebec. It comprises 720,000 square kilometres and its present territory includes spans from Magog in the west to the Gaspe and the Magdalen Islands in the east, from the United States border in the south to Kawawachikamach and several communities along the Lower North Shore to the north.

The see city is in Quebec City and its cathedral is Holy Trinity Anglican Cathedral, completed in 1804. The diocese counts approximately 1,600 Anglican faithful who gather in 65 parishes as of 2022. The current bishop is the Rt Rev Bruce Myers OGS.

== History ==
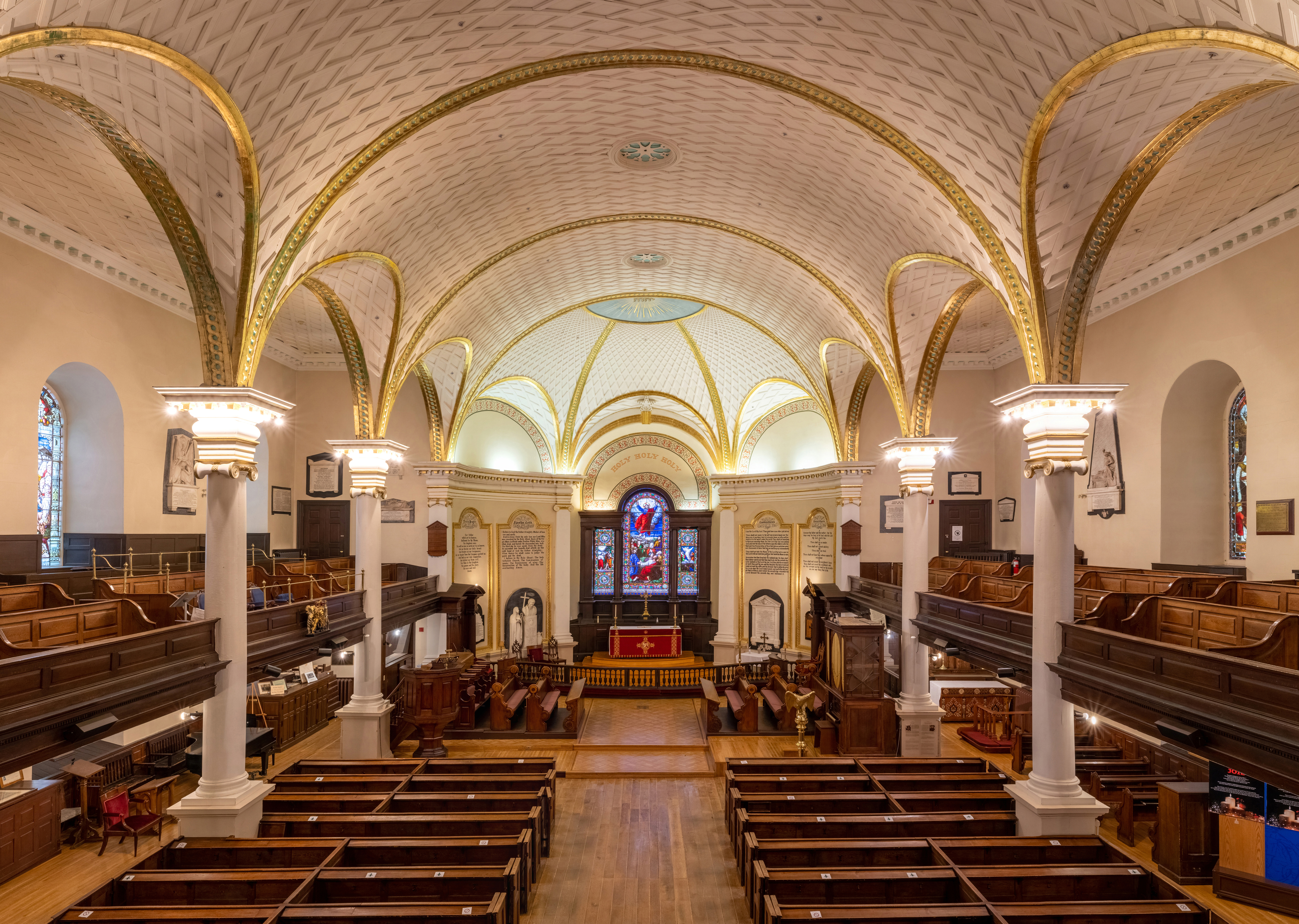
Cathedral of the Holy Trinity, Quebec city

Membership in the Anglican Diocese of Quebec
Year	Pop.	±%
1976	14,316	—
1986	10,633	−25.7%
1996	8,583	−19.3%
2006	3,576	−58.3%
2016	4,000	+11.9%
2022	1,586	−60.3%

Following the Conquest of New France, the territory of the Anglican Diocese of Quebec was under the jurisdiction of several other dioceses. It formed part of the Diocese of London from 1760 to 1787, followed by the Diocese of Nova Scotia, from 1787 to 1793. The Anglican Diocese of Quebec was founded by Letters Patent, granted by George III in 1793.

The diocese originally consisted of both Lower Canada (present day Quebec) and Upper Canada (present day Ontario), stretching from the New Brunswick and Labrador borders in the east to Lake Superior in the west.

Successive portions of the territory of the Anglican Diocese of Quebec broke away to form new dioceses, beginning with the Anglican Diocese of Toronto in 1839 and ending with the Anglican Diocese of Montreal in 1850, at which point its present territory was finalized. In 1842, its jurisdiction was described as "Canada East" which covers the present day civil province of Quebec..

With both the Anglican Diocese of Quebec and Montreal having fewer than 10,000 members combined and decreasing numbers, discussions are underway to explore ways the two dioceses can work more closely together.

== Bishops of Quebec ==
No.	Image	Name	Dates	Notes
1		Jacob Mountain	1793–1825	father of George
2		Charles J. Stewart	1826–1837	
3		George Mountain	1850–1863	Bishop suffragan of Montreal and bishop coadjutor, 1836–1850 administered the diocese until 1850
4		James W. Williams	1863–1892	father of Lennox
5		Andrew Hunter Dunn	1892–1914	
6		Lennox W. Williams	1915–1935	son of James
7		Philip Carrington	1935–1960	Metropolitan of Canada, 1944–1960
8		Russel F. Brown	1960–1971	
9		Timothy J. Matthews	1971–1977	
10		Allen Goodings	1977–1990	
11		A. Bruce Stavert	1990–2009	Metropolitan of Canada, 2004–2009
12		Dennis P. Drainville	2009–2017	
13		Bruce Myers OGS	2017–present	

== Deans of Quebec ==
The Dean of Quebec is also Rector of Holy Trinity Cathedral.

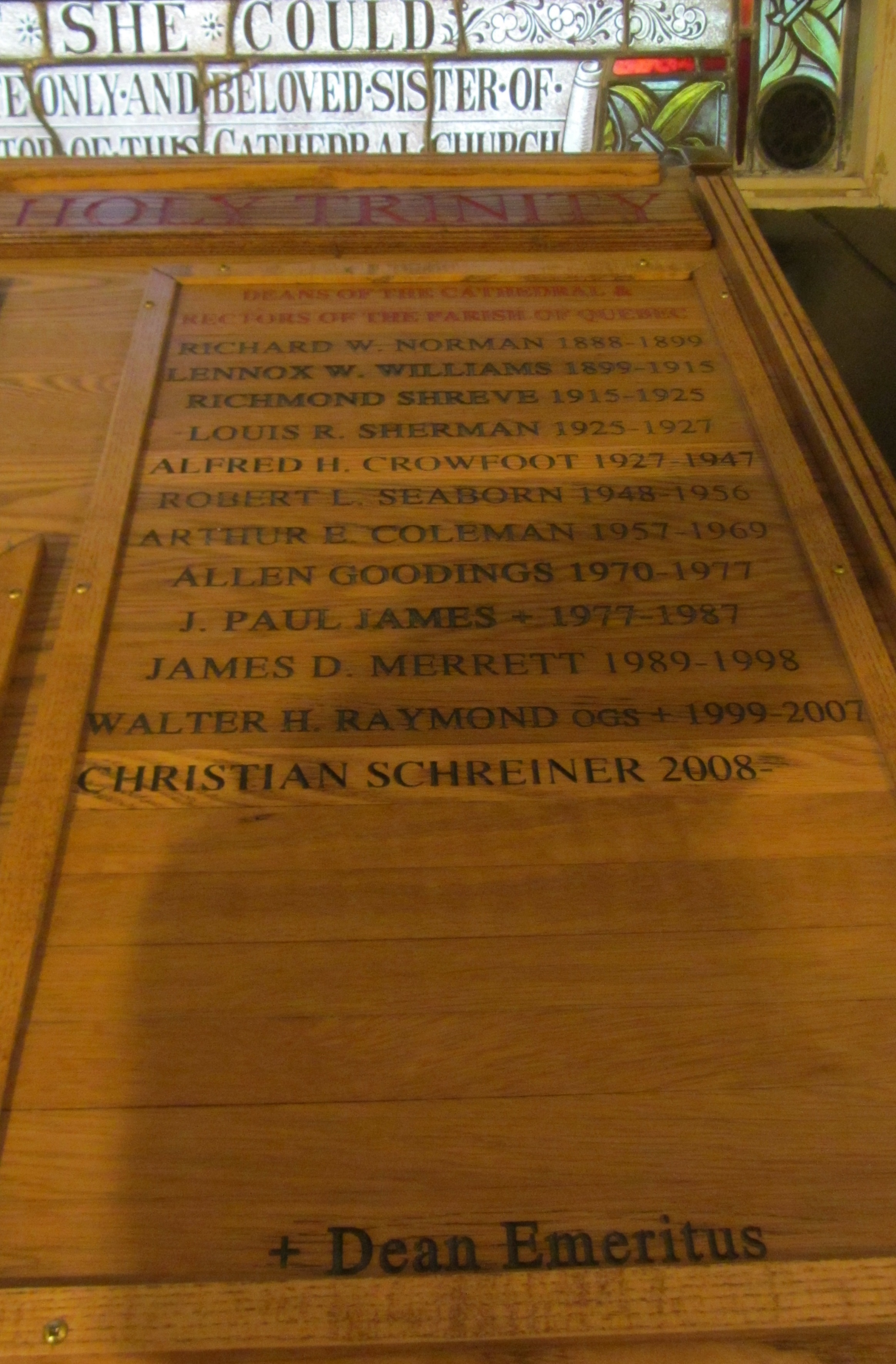
List of deans, Holy Trinity Cathedral, Quebec City, Quebec, Canada, in 2015

- 1888–1899: Richard W. Norman
- 1899–1915: Lennox W. Williams
- 1915–1925: Richmond Shreve
- 1925–1927: Louis R. Sherman (afterwards Bishop of Calgary, 1927)
- 1927–1947: Alfred Henchman Crowfoot
- 1948–1957: Robert L. Seaborn (afterwards Bishop of Newfoundland, 1965)
- 1957–1969: Arthur B. Coleman
- 1970–1977: Allen Goodings
- 1977–1987: J. Paul James
- 1989–1998: James D. Merrett
- 1999–2007: Walter H. Raymond OGS
- 2008–present: Christian Schreiner
