= Alan Reid =

Alan or Allan Reid may refer to:

== Sportsmen ==
- Allan Reid (cricketer) (1877–1948), South African cricketer
- Alan Reid (footballer, born 1926) (1926–1988), Australian rules player for Geelong
- Alan Reid (cricketer) (1931–2012), Australian right hand bat wicketkeeper
- Alan Reid (footballer, born 1956), Australian rules player for East Fremantle, Essendon and Geelong
- Alan Reid (Scottish footballer) (born 1980), Scottish full-back
- Allan Reid (Jamaican footballer) in 2001 FIFA World Youth Championship squads

== Others ==
- Alan Reid (journalist) (1914–1987), Australian political writer, a/k/a the Red Fox
- Alan Reid (courtier) (born 1947), English Chairman of Duchy of Lancaster and Keeper of Privy Purse
- Alan Reid (musician) (born 1950), Scottish folk multi-instrumentalist and songwriter
- Alan Reid (politician) (born 1954), Scottish Liberal Democrat MP for Argyll and Bute
- Alan Reid (mathematician) (born 1962), Scottish-American academic working with hyperbolic 3-manifolds
- Alan Reid (artist) (born 1976), American creator of pencil drawings
- Allan Reid, Canadian 2006 winner of Juno Award for Music DVD of the Year

== See also ==
- Allan Read (1923–2003), Canadian Anglican bishop of Ontario
- Alan Reed (disambiguation)
- Alan Read, writer and professor of theatre
