= Peter Mason (bishop) =

Anglican bishop on Ontario, Canada

Peter Ralph Mason (born 30 April 1943) was the Anglican Bishop of Ontario from 1992 until 2002.

He was educated at McGill University and ordained Deacon in 1967; and Priest in 1968. After a curacy at Hampstead, Quebec he held incumbencies at Hemmingford, Verdun and Halifax. He was the Principal of Wycliffe College, Toronto from 1985 until his elevation to the episcopate.

Bishop Peter Mason looked into reports alleging abuse of staff of Grenville Christian College in 2001. He admitted in an email in 2001 that he was “most anxious about the situation” and that he was “trying to grasp the enormity of the troubles that had ensued over the years.” He recommended that the staff get counseling. He also traveled across the border to the Community of Jesus in Massachusetts to investigate. In 2007, Bishop Mason told The Globe and Mail, a national newspaper in Canada, that he did not think the complaints brought to him by Grenville staff about The Rev. Charles Farnsworth, Grenville headmaster, were “substantive enough for him to take disciplinary action”. He said that he had heard allegations from former staff members of cult behavior at Grenville, but had not been aware that it involved students.

Religious titles
Preceded by Allan Read	Bishop of Ontario; 1992–2002	Succeeded by George Bruce
