= Alan Reed (disambiguation) =

Alan Reed (1907–1977), was an actor.

Alan Reed may also refer to:

- Alan Reed (RAAF officer); see List of Royal Australian Air Force air marshals
- Alan Reed, musician in Pallas (band)
- Allen B. Reed, US Navy officer

== See also ==
- Alan Reid (disambiguation)
- Allan Reid (disambiguation)
- Alan Read, writer and professor of theatre
- Allan Read, bishop of Ontario
