= Henry Hill (bishop) =

Canadian bishop

Henry Gordon Hill (14 December 1921 – 21 October 2006) was the Anglican Bishop of Ontario from 1975 until 1981.

He was educated at Queen's University, Kingston and St John's College, Cambridge. He was ordained Deacon in 1948; and Priest in 1950. His first posts were curacies in Belleville and Adolphustown. He was then Chaplain of St John's College, Cambridge from 1952 to 1955 and then held a further curacy at Wisbech. After this he was in the incumbencies at Reddendale and then an Academic at the University of Windsor until his elevation to the episcopate. In 1980, he was selected by Robert Runcie, the Archbishop of Canterbury to be his successor as the co-chair of the international Anglican-Orthodox joint discourse discussion.

Hill’s obituary states that "he was the Episcopal Visitor of the Community of Jesus in Cape Cod, MA and had close connections with the Grenville Christian College in Brockville, ON."

Religious titles
Preceded by Jack Creggan	Bishop of Ontario; 1975–1981	Succeeded by Allan Read
