= Jim Njegovan =

21st-century Canadian Anglican bishop

The Right Reverend Jim Njegovan
- 6th Bishop of Brandon
- Church: Anglican Church of Canada
- Province: Rupert's Land
- Diocese: Brandon
- In office: 2002–2015
- Predecessor: Malcolm Harding
- Successor: William Cliff

Orders
- Ordination: 1979
- Consecration: 2002

Personal details
- Denomination: Anglican
- Education: St. John's College, Manitoba

James Njegovan, known as Jim Njegovan, was the Bishop of Brandon from 2002 until 2015.

== Career ==
Njegovan was educated at St. John's College, University of Manitoba, and ordained in 1979. He served parishes in Winnipeg before becoming Dean of Brandon and Rector of St. Matthew's Anglican Cathedral in 1992, a post he held until his elevation to the episcopate. He was consecrated bishop in Brandon Cathedral on 2 February 2002. Njegovan announced his retirement, effective 31 July 2015, in a pastoral letter dated Palm Sunday, 29 March 2015.

== Controversy ==
In 2005 Njegovan banned the independent newspaper The Anglican Planet from being distributed in churches in his diocese and criticized it as "sowing the seeds of distrust and disdain within the Church" and said that he did not "wish to see it distributed in, or to, our parishes."

Njegovan also faced criticism within the diocese when he appointed his 27-year-old son Noah James Bernard Njegovan as Archdeacon of Brandon and diocesan Executive Officer. Noah Njegovan has subsequently been arrested and charged for theft and embezzlement. The charges allege that during the period of 2010–2012 Noah Njegovan stole over $200,000 from the diocese and used to purchase vehicles, several trips to Las Vegas and massages.

Anglican Communion titles
Preceded by Malcolm Harding	Bishop of Brandon; 2002–2015	Succeeded by William Cliff
