= St. Mary's College, Brockville =

Former school in Ontario, Canada

Coordinates: 44.6264°N 75.6303°W

St. Mary's College is a former high school and junior seminary that was operated by the Congregation of the Most Holy Redeemer, a missionary order of the Catholic Church more commonly known as "Redemptorists."

The school was located on a campus on the north bank of the St. Lawrence River in Maitland, Ontario, several kilometres east of Brockville.

St. Mary's College (Juvenate) was established by the church's Ecclesiastical Province of Toronto in 1918 when campus construction took place. The date of canonical erection was September 5, 1920. The school functioned as a preparatory college for students initially drawn from Montreal, Prescott and Kirkwood, Missouri under its first Rector, The Reverend Charles Kelz.

For the next 50 years, aside from the juvenate closing temporarily from 1941-1944 because of World War II, St. Mary's College educated nearly 550 boys, constituting nearly every English-speaking Redemptorist in Canada as part of the initial stage in the formation process of training for the priesthood.

St. Mary's College was the First Novitiate for Chorists and Laybrothers from 1944-1947 and it reopened as a juvenate in 1947 and operated as such until its last class graduated in June 1968.

One of the primary reasons for declining enrollment at St. Mary's was a 1960 decision by the Ecclesiastical Province of Edmonton to establish a junior seminary, Holy Redeemer College, for training western candidates.

The date of canonical suppression at St. Mary's College is January 21, 1969.

The school's campus and buildings were sold later that year to a group called Berean Christian Schools who hoped to use the facility as a private school. In 1975, the campus evolved into a private university preparatory school called Grenville Christian College. Grenville Christian College operated for 37 years and closed its doors in July 2007 due to declining enrollment.
