= George Bruce (bishop) =

Canadian Anglican bishop (1942–2024)

- Born: 20 June 1942; Ely, Cambridgeshire, England
- Died: 23 March 2024 (aged 81); Ontario, Canada
- Citizenship: English-born Canadian
- Occupation: Clergyman
- Spouse: Theo
- Children: 5
- Ordained: May 1987
- Offices held: Bishop of Ontario (2002-2011)

George Bruce (20 June 1942 – 23 March 2024) was the Bishop of Ontario from 2002 until 2011.

Born on 20 June 1942 in Ely, Cambridgeshire, England, his family emigrated to Canada in 1953. From 1959 until 1986 he served in the Canadian Forces. He holds a degree from the Royal Military College of Canada, Kingston and was ordained two years after he received his degree. He began his second career with a curacy at St Matthew Ottawa before being appointed Rector of Winchester, Ontario and then St. James the Apostle, Perth, Ontario. In 2000 he became Dean of St George's Cathedral before being appointed Bishop of the Diocese two years later. A reflective man, Bruce was married with five children.

In 2007, Bruce was referenced in The Globe and Mail, a national newspaper in Canada, for refusing to investigate an ex-student's plea to investigate abuse that she and others suffered at Grenville Christian College in the Anglican Diocese of Ontario. The Globe and Mail later confirmed that Bruce had launched an investigation, which was stopped when a criminal investigation was begun.

Bruce died at Kingston General Hospital in Ontario on 23 March 2024, at the age of 81.

Religious titles
Preceded by Peter Mason	Bishop of Ontario; 2002–2011	Succeeded by Michael Oulton
