= Diocese of Brandon =

Diocese of the Anglican Church in Canada

Location
- Ecclesiastical province: Northern Lights
- Coordinates: 49.8435°N 99.9555°W

Statistics
- Parishes: 25 (2022)
- Members: 2,935 (2022)

Information
- Rite: Anglican
- Cathedral: St. Matthew's Anglican Cathedral, Brandon

Current leadership
- Bishop: Rachael Parker
- Dean: Christopher Evetts

Map
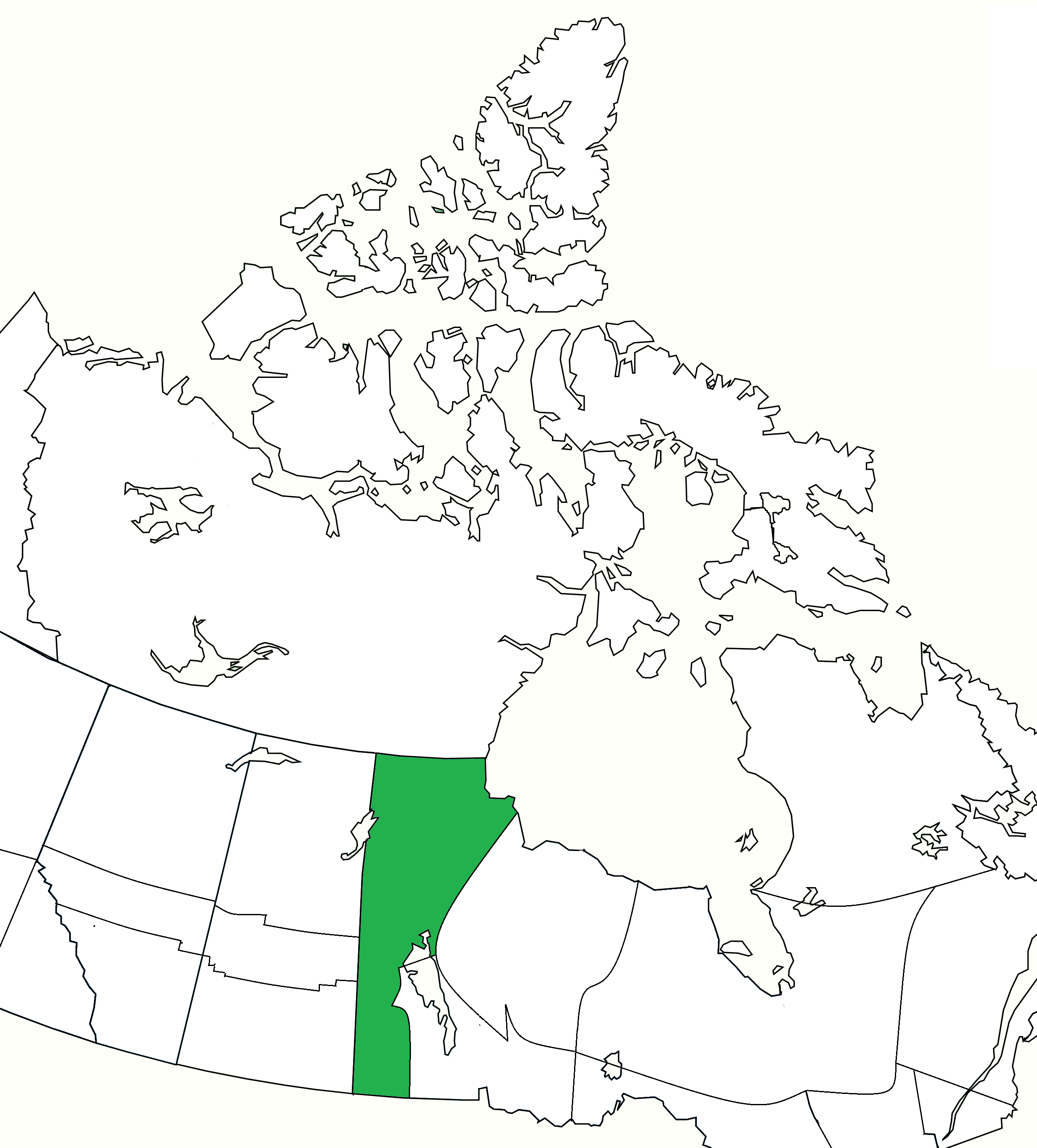
- Boundaries of the diocese within the Province of the Northern Lights

Website
- dioceseofbrandon.org

The Diocese of Brandon is a diocese of the Ecclesiastical Province of the Northern Lights of the Anglican Church of Canada. It has an area of 170,000 square kilometres (65,000 sq mi). Its cathedral is St. Matthew's Cathedral in Brandon, which was established in 1952.

The first synod of the diocese of Brandon was held on 24 June 1924. St Matthew's church in Brandon was declared a pro-cathedral in May, 1945 and upgraded to full cathedral status on October 5, 1952. The then rector of St Matthew's, B.O. Whitfield, was appointed the first Dean of Brandon in 1957.

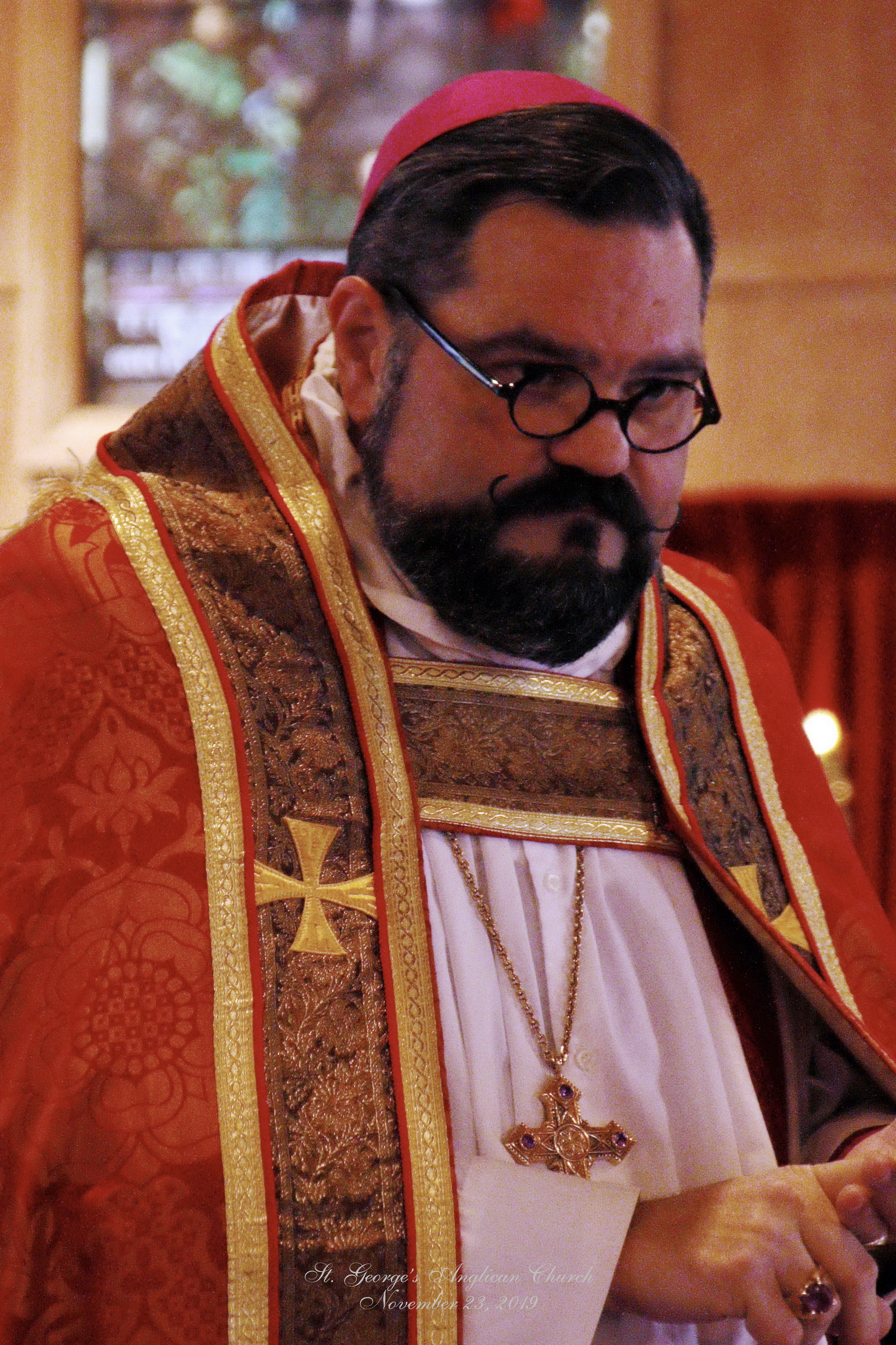
Bishop Cliff preaching in 2019

== Bishops of Brandon ==
| No. | Name | Dates | Notes |
|---|---|---|---|
| 1 | Wilfred Thomas | 1924–1950 | |
| 2 | Ivor Norris | 1950–1969 | |
| 3 | Thomas Wilkinson | 1969–1975 | |
| 4 | John Conlin | 1975–1992 | |
| 5 | Malcolm Harding | 1992–2001 | |
| 6 | Jim Njegovan | 2002–2015 | |
| 7 | William Grant Cliff | 2016–2023 | Translated to Ontario |
| 8 | Rachael Parker | 2024–present | |

== Deans of Brandon ==
The Dean of Brandon is also the Rector of St Matthew's Cathedral.

Source: Diocese of Brandon

| No. | Name | Dates | Notes |
|---|---|---|---|
| – | position held by Bishop Ivor Norris | 1952–1957 | |
| 1 | B.O. Whitfield | 1957–1960 | First Dean of Brandon |
| 2 | Morse Lamb Goodman | 1960–1965 | later Bishop of Calgary, 1968 |
| 3 | Thomas Wilkinson | 1965–1969 | later Bishop of Brandon, 1969 |
| 4 | John Conlin | 1969–1975 | later Bishop of Brandon, 1975 |
| 5 | Harry Hobbs | 1975–1979 | |
| 6 | Noel Goater | 1980–1987 | |
| 7 | Thomas Crawford | 1987–1992 | |
| 8 | James Njegovan | 1992–2002 | later Bishop of Brandon, 2002 |
| 9 | Robin Walker | 2003–2013 | |
| 10 | Nigel Packwood | 2014–2016 | |
| 11 | Don Bernhardt | 2016–2025 | |
| 12 | Christopher Evetts | 2025-Present | |
