= Henry Patton (19th-century priest) =

Canadian Anglican priest (1806–1874)

The Venerable Henry Patton
- Archdeacon of Kingston
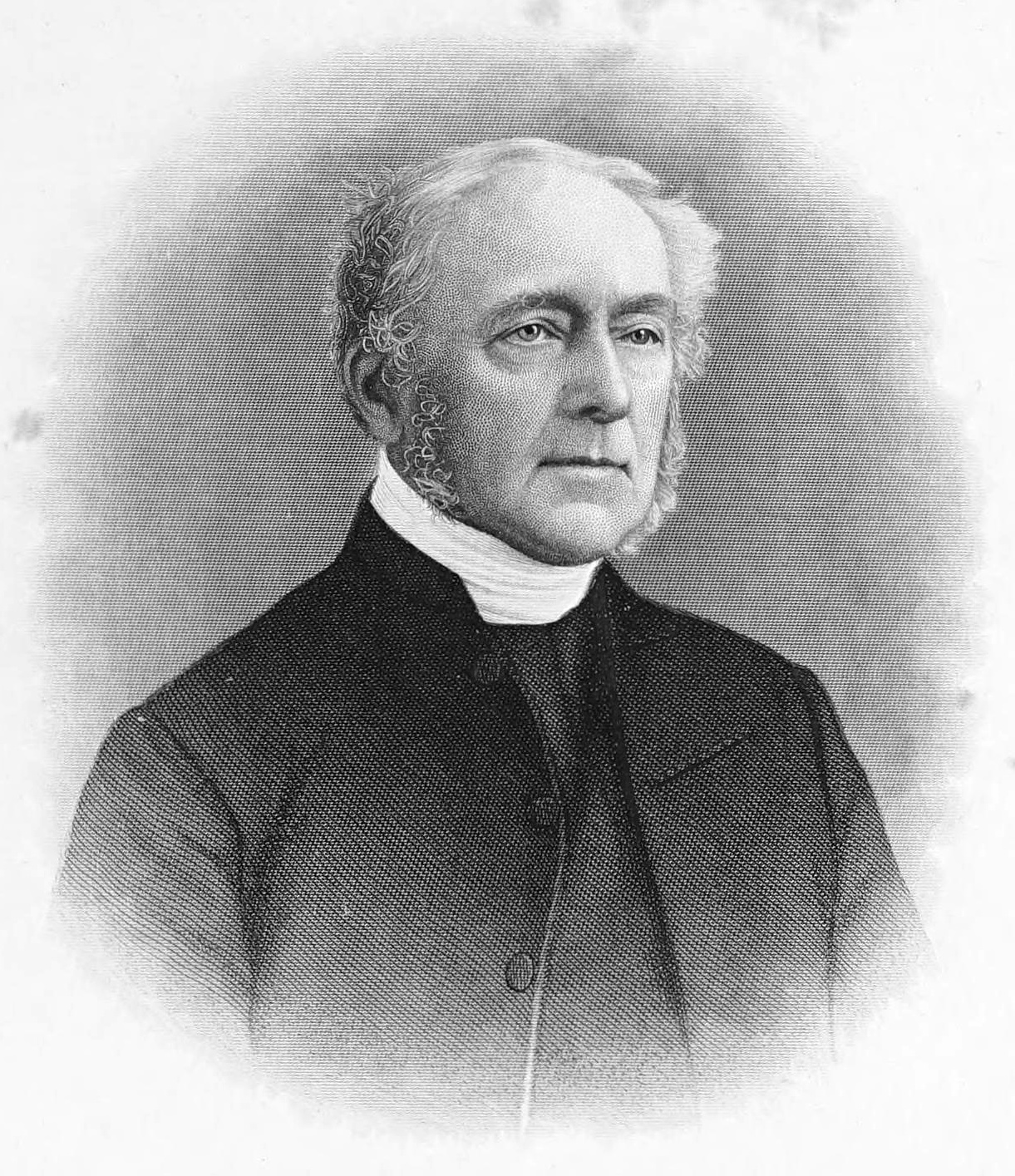
- Diocese: Diocese of Ontario
- Appointed: 1861
- Predecessor: Position established
- Previous posts: Rector of Trinity Church, Cornwall; Rector of St Thomas', Belleville; Rural Dean of Ontario

Orders
- Ordination: September 26, 1830

Personal details
- Born: March 27, 1806 Chelmsford, England
- Died: April 30, 1874 (aged 68) Belleville, Ontario, Canada
- Denomination: Anglicanism
- Spouse: Harriet Warner (died 1844); Georgina Dodson (married 1846; died 1862)
- Children: 10
- Education: Trinity College, Toronto

Henry Patton (March 27, 1806 – April 30, 1874) was an Anglican priest in Canada.

== Life ==
Patton was born on 27 March, 1806, in Chelmsford, England, and was the son of Major Andrew Patton. In 1816 he immigrated with his family to Upper Canada, settling in what is now Eastern Ontario. He completed his early education at Brockville Grammar School.

Upon completion of his theological education he was ordained a deacon by Bishop Charles James Stewart on June 29, 1829, and ordained a priest about a year later on September 26, 1830. After a time of missionary work in Kemptville, Ontario he was appointed Rector of Trinity Church, Cornwall in 1846, where he remained for twenty-five years. In 1849 Patton was appointed Rural Dean of Johnstown. During his tenure at Trinity Church, he promoted the construction of the current building, named Bishop Strachan Memorial Church after former rector and first bishop of the Anglican Diocese of Toronto John Strachan. The groundbreaking of this new church was observed in 1869, and the consecration took place in 1875, only one year after Patton's death.

When the Anglican Diocese of Ontario was created in 1862, Patton was appointed Archdeacon of Kingston, later Archdeacon of Ontario, by Bishop John Travers Lewis. His archidiaconal responsibilities extended over much of Eastern Ontario. Trinity College, Toronto later conferred on him the degree of Doctor of Canon Law (D.C.L.) in recognition of his service to the Church.

In 1871, Patton was elected Prolocutor of the Provincial Synod of the Ecclesiastical Province of Canada, being re-elected in both 1872 and 1873. Later that year, Patton was transferred to Belleville, Ontario where he became Rector of Saint Thomas' Church, Belleville.

Patton died in Belleville on April 30, 1874 while serving as the Rector of Saint Thomas' Church. The community in which he initially served, Kemptville, created a Memorial Fund for the purpose of constructing a new stone church in his memory. This church, Archdeacon Patton Memorial Church, was opened on June 6, 1878.
