= Charles Seager (bishop) =

Canadian Anglican bishop

Orders
- Consecration: 24 August 1926 by David Williams

The Most Rev Charles Allen Seager (1872–1948) was Anglican Bishop of Ontario, then Huron and finally Metropolitan of Ontario in the 20th century.

Born in 1872, he was educated at Trinity College, Toronto. He was in turn rector of St Cyprian's, Toronto, principal of St Mark's Divinity Hall, Vancouver, British Columbia, provost (1921–1926) and vice-chancellor of his old college and finally, before his elevation to the episcopate, prebendary and chancellor of Toronto Cathedral.

He died in 1948.

Church of England titles
Preceded by Edward Bidwell	Bishop of Ontario; 1926–1932	Succeeded by John Lyons
Preceded by David Williams	Bishop of Huron; 1932–1948	Succeeded by George Luxton
Preceded by John Anderson	Metropolitan of Ontario; 1944–1948	Succeeded by John Lyons
