= Kenneth Evans =

Kenneth Evans may refer to:

- Kenneth Evans (actor) (1888–1954) in 1942 film In Which We Serve
- Kenneth Evans (bishop of Ontario) (1903–1970)
- Kenneth Evans (racing driver) (1912–1985)
- Kenneth Evans (bishop of Dorking) (1915–2007)
- Kenneth A. Evans (1898–1970), American Republican businessman and politician
