= Thomas Wilkinson (bishop of Brandon) =

Canadian Anglican bishop

Thomas Wilfrid Wilkinson was the third Bishop of Brandon in Canada.

He was ordained in 1929 and began his career as Curate at Hudson Bay Junction after which he held incumbencies in Macklin and Tisdale. From 1941 to 1945 he was a chaplain in the RCAF. When peace returned he was Rural Dean of Melfort then Archdeacon of Dauphin. His last post before elevation to the episcopate was as Rector of St. Matthew's Cathedral, Brandon and Dean of Brandon.

== Notes ==
Anglican Communion titles
Preceded by Ivor Arthur Norris	Bishop of Brandon; 1969 – 1975	Succeeded by John Fletcher Stout Conlin
