= Wilfred Thomas =

Welsh-born Canadian bishop (1875–1953)

Wilfred William Henry Thomas (1875–1953) was the inaugural Bishop of Brandon.

He was born in Tenby in 1875 and educated at Reading School. Ordained in 1898, he began his career as Curate of Christ's Church Cathedral, Hamilton, Ontario after which he held incumbencies in Winnipeg and Selkirk. From 1916 to 1924 he was Archdeacon of East Manitoba when he was elevated to the episcopate.

== Notes ==
Anglican Communion titles
Preceded by Inaugural appointment	Bishop of Brandon; 1924 – 1950	Succeeded by Ivor Arthur Norris
