= William Cliff (bishop) =

Canadian Anglican bishop (born 1966)

The Right Reverend William Cliff
- Bishop of Ontario
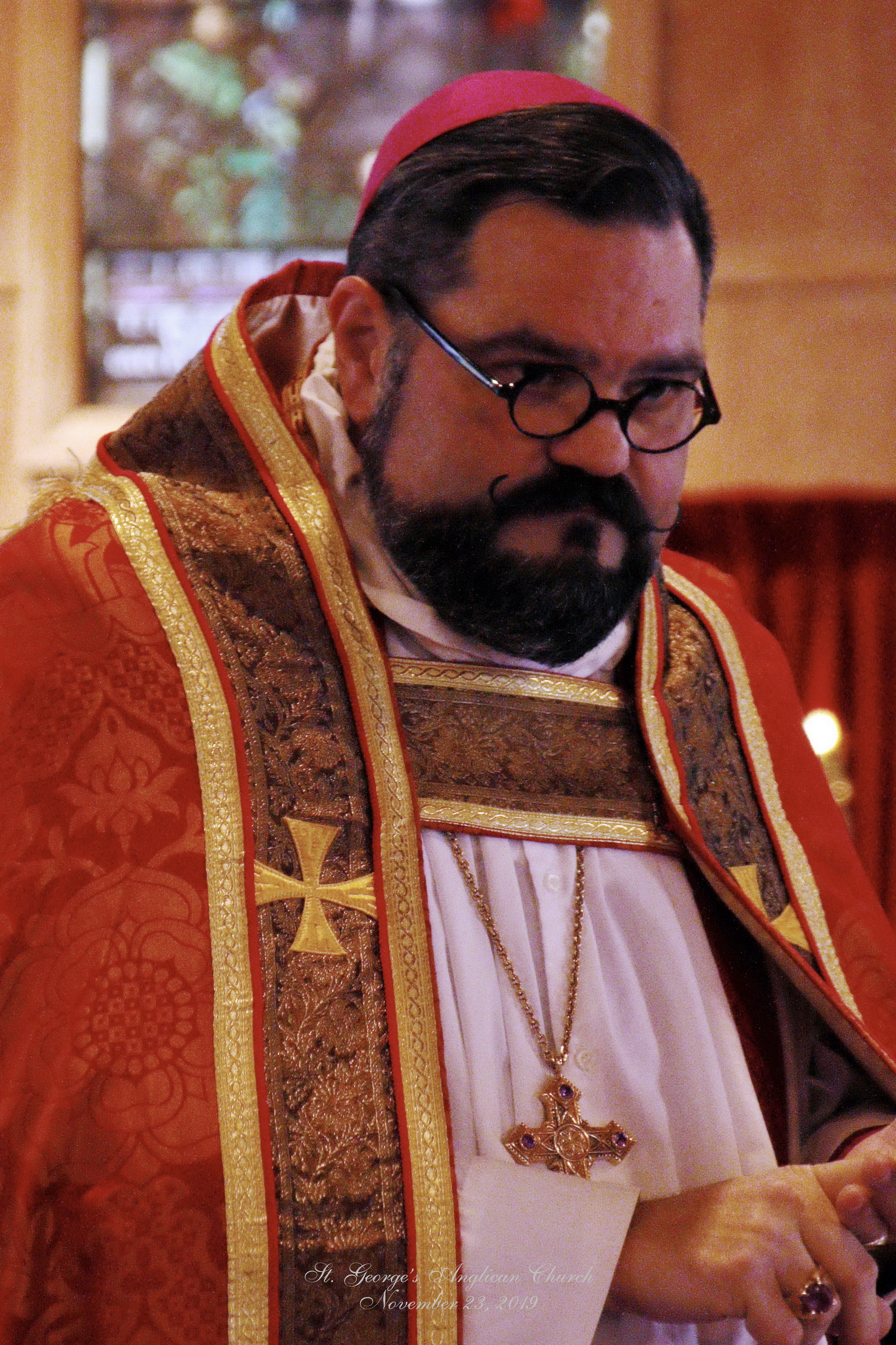
- Church: Anglican Church of Canada
- Diocese: Ontario
- In office: 2023–present
- Predecessor: Michael Oulton
- Other posts: Bishop of Brandon, 2016–2023

Orders
- Ordination: May 14, 1992 (diaconate); November 30, 1992 (priesthood) by Robert Townshend (diaconate) and Percy O'Driscoll (priesthood)
- Consecration: March 1, 2016 by Greg Kerr-Wilson

Personal details
- Born: William Grant Cliff; April 26, 1966 (age 60) Sarnia, Ontario, Canada
- Denomination: Anglican
- Education: University of Western Ontario; King's University College

William Grant Cliff (born 1966) is a Canadian Anglican bishop and musician. Since 2023, Cliff has been the 13th bishop of the Diocese of Ontario, prior to which he was bishop of the Anglican Diocese of Brandon.

== Biography ==
He was born in 1966, in Sarnia, Ontario, and raised in nearby Wyoming, Ontario. Cliff attended his local primary school, Wyoming Public, before skipping Grade 8 and attending Lambton Central Collegiate and Vocational Institute in Petrolia from 1979 to 1984. Following this, he attended the University of Western Ontario Faculty of Music from 1984 to 1988. Following this, he attended King's at Western for a B.A. in Religious Studies before attending Huron University College from 1989 to 1992. He was ordained deacon on May 14, 1992, by Suffragan Bishop Robert Townshend of the Diocese of Huron, and ordained priest on November 30, 1992, by Archbishop Percy O'Driscoll of the Diocese of Huron.

Cliff served as Curate to the Rev. Terry Dance at Trinity Church in Simcoe, Ontario (1992-1995) before moving to his first parish as Rector in Grey County at Trinity Church, Durham and St. James' Church in Hanover, Ontario (1995-1998) and then to St. John the Evangelist Strathroy with St. Ann's Adelaide (1998-2002). In 2002, Cliff was appointed Rector of the Collegiate Chapel of St. John the Evangelist, Huron University College, Chaplain to Huron University College, and Anglican Chaplain to the University of Western Ontario. He served there for over 13 years with a vibrant outreach to undergraduate students and a busy worship life at Huron's Chapel. A regular speaker across Canada on issues facing young people and their faith, he has been published in journals and periodicals especially on the topic of the needs of youth and intentional Bible study and discipleship.

Cliff was elected bishop of the Diocese of Brandon in 2015 and consecrated after moving to Brandon in 2016. He was consecrated Bishop on March 1, 2016, by Archbishop Greg Kerr-Wilson, assisted by the Primate of Canada and the bishops of Edmonton, Saskatchewan, Saskatoon, Qu'Appelle, Rupert's Land, Niagara, Huron, the retired bishop of the Diocese of Brandon, and the Lutheran bishop of the Manitoba and Northern Synod of the ELCIC.

He serves the National Church as Secretary to the House of Bishops, Member of the Communications and Information Committee and as a Pension Trustee for the General Synod Pension Plan.

On May 2, 2023, only three days following his election as bishop of Ontario, Cliff was inhibited by the Most Rev. Anne Germond, metropolitan of the Province of Ontario. Sitting Ontario Bishop Michael Oulton and Germond wrote that they had received "allegations" against Cliff and that "proper authorities have been informed." In light of these allegations, Germond paused the process of ratifying Cliff's election in favour of an investigation into this allegation. Cliff was also inhibited from his duties in the Province of Rupert's Land by Kerr-Wilson, who nevertheless stated that:“The Inhibition does not imply, or presume guilt on Bishop Cliff’s part, but is enacted in keeping with our church’s commitment to take all allegations seriously and to facilitate transparency in the investigation process.” Following the investigation, Germond announced on August 1, 2023, that the allegations were not supported by evidence, all inhibitions had been lifted, concurrence from the Ontario house of bishops had been received, and there was no remaining impediment to Cliff's installation as the 13th bishop of the Diocese of Ontario. The result of the investigation was presented as clear and unambiguous.

Cliff was installed as bishop of Ontario on October 21, 2023, at St. George's Cathedral in Kingston.

== Musical performance and public service ==
Cliff, a singer, who played trumpet as a youth, but switched to voice as a student at the University of Western Ontario, has performed at charity fundraising events as a member of a vocal trio of three Anglican priests since the 1990s, the "Three Cantors." The group includes Dean Peter Wall and Archdeacon David Pickett.

Cliff, who was raised in the Pentecostal Church, where the music "grabs you by the soul and shakes you," has said that he discovered his vocation through music when one of his music professors took him to a cathedral. He joined the choir and not long afterward spoke to the dean of the cathedral about attending a seminary. Cliff earned his master of divinity degree in 1992.

From 1997 to 2004 Cliff served as a commissioner of the Human Rights Commission of Ontario under Chief Commissioner Keith Norton. He was appointed a Canon of the Cathedral Chapter of St. Paul's Cathedral, London, Ontario in 2003 and named Canon Precentor of the Diocese of Huron in 2009. While in the Diocese of Huron he served as a liturgical Master of Ceremonies from 1995 until his election and departure to Brandon in 2016. In that time, he also compiled and published a volume for use in the Diocese of Huron called "Eucharistic Canons of the Anglican Communion" (2013) to better assist the liturgy and prayer in the Diocese of Huron. Cliff also earned an M.A. in historical theology while working at Huron with a Thesis on the Chapel Royal and influences of Elizabeth I on politics in her day.

Along with the other singers of the Three Cantors and Mr. Angus Sinclair their accompanist, Cliff was awarded a Doctor of Divinity degree (honoris causa) while still at Huron in 2013. He was also awarded the Queen's Diamond Jubilee Medal for services to higher education in 2013.

Anglican Communion titles
Preceded by Jim Njegovan	Bishop of Brandon; 2016–2023	Succeeded by Rachael Parker
Preceded by Michael Oulton	Bishop of Ontario; 2023–present	Incumbent
