= John Conlin =

Canadian Anglican bishop (1932–1991)

John Fletcher Stout Conlin (1932-1991) was the fourth Bishop of Brandon. Born in Belfast he came to Canada in 1952. He was educated at the University of Saskatchewan and ordained in 1958. He began his career as Curate at Gilbert Plains, Manitoba after which he held incumbencies in Killarney, Manitoba and Fort Saskatchewan, Alberta. From 1969 to 1975 he was Dean of the Diocese of Brandon and Rector of St. Matthew's Anglican Cathedral (Brandon) when in 1975 he was elected to the episcopate.

Church of England titles
Preceded by Thomas Wilkinson	Bishop of Brandon; 1975–1992	Succeeded by Malcolm Harding
