= Malcolm Harding (bishop of Brandon) =

English-born Canadian Anglican bishop (1936–2026)

The Right Reverend Malcolm Harding
- Bishop of Brandon
- Church: Anglican Church of Canada
- Diocese: Brandon
- In office: 1992–2001
- Predecessor: John Conlin
- Successor: Jim Njegovan
- Other posts: Assisting bishop, Anglican Network in Canada

Orders
- Ordination: 1962 (diaconate)
- Consecration: 1992 by Michael Peers

Personal details
- Born: 28 June 1936 Sheffield, England, UK
- Died: 14 June 2026 (aged 89) Brandon, Manitoba, Canada

Malcolm Alfred Warden Harding (28 June 1936 – 14 June 2026) was an English-born Canadian Anglican bishop. He was the fifth bishop of Brandon in the Anglican Church of Canada from 1992 to 2001.

== Biography ==
Harding was born in Sheffield, England, in 1936 and migrated with his family to Canada in 1947.

He was educated at The University of Western Ontario and ordained a priest in 1962. He began his ordained ministry in charge of five rural parishes in the Diocese of Fredericton, after which he worked for the Children's Aid Society in a number of roles in Ontario until 1973. He then became rector of St George's Brandon, Manitoba. He was archdeacon of the area until 1992 when he was ordained to the episcopate. He retired in 2001.

He was the second Anglican Church of Canada bishop to leave, after Don Harvey in November 2007, due to the theological liberalism of the church, becoming a suffragan bishop in the Anglican Network in Canada, then affiliated with the Anglican Church of the Southern Cone of America, and a founding diocese of the Anglican Church in North America, in June 2009.

Harding died at 89 in Brandon.

== Notes ==
Anglican Communion titles
Preceded by John Conlin	Bishop of Brandon; 1992 – 2001	Succeeded by James Njegovan
