= Edward Bidwell =

English Anglican clergyman

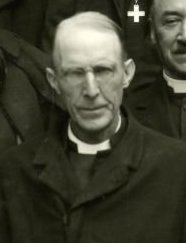
The Right Reverend Edward Bidwell in 1924

Edward John Bidwell (26 November 1866 – 11 August 1941) was an English Anglican clergyman, who served as Bishop of Ontario from 1917 to 1926.

== Biography ==
He was born into an ecclesiastical family – his father was George Bidwell, sometime Rector of Simpson, Buckinghamshire, United Kingdom. He was educated at Bradfield and Wadham College, Oxford.

Ordained in 1892 he was successively headmaster of the Preparatory School, Leamington College and then the Cathedral Grammar School, Peterborough. In 1903 he emigrated to Canada to be headmaster of Bishop's College School, Lennoxville before being appointed Dean of Ontario in 1909, a post he held for eight years. From 1913 to 1917 he was Bishop suffragan of Kingston and coadjutor bishop to William Mills in the Diocese of Ontario. He succeeded Mills as Bishop of Ontario in 1917. He stepped down as bishop in 1926.

Having returned to England, he served as Vicar of Sellindge, Kent from 1930 to 1941. He was additionally an Assistant Bishop of Canterbury (1935–1941), and an honorary canon of Canterbury Cathedral. He retired in 1941 and served as canon emeritus until his death on 11 August 1941.

Church of England titles
Preceded by William Mills	Bishop of Ontario; 1917–1926	Succeeded by Charles Seager

== See also ==
- List of Bishop's College School alumni
