= John Lewis (archbishop of Ontario) =

The Most Reverend John Lewis
- Bishop of Ontario
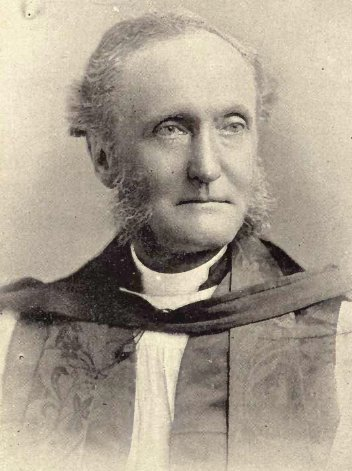
- Diocese: Ontario
- Installed: 1861
- Term ended: 1901
- Predecessor: Inaugural appointment
- Successor: William Lennox Mills

Personal details
- Born: June 20, 1825 Garrycloyne Castle, near Cork (Ireland)
- Died: May 6, 1901 (aged 75) at sea en route to England

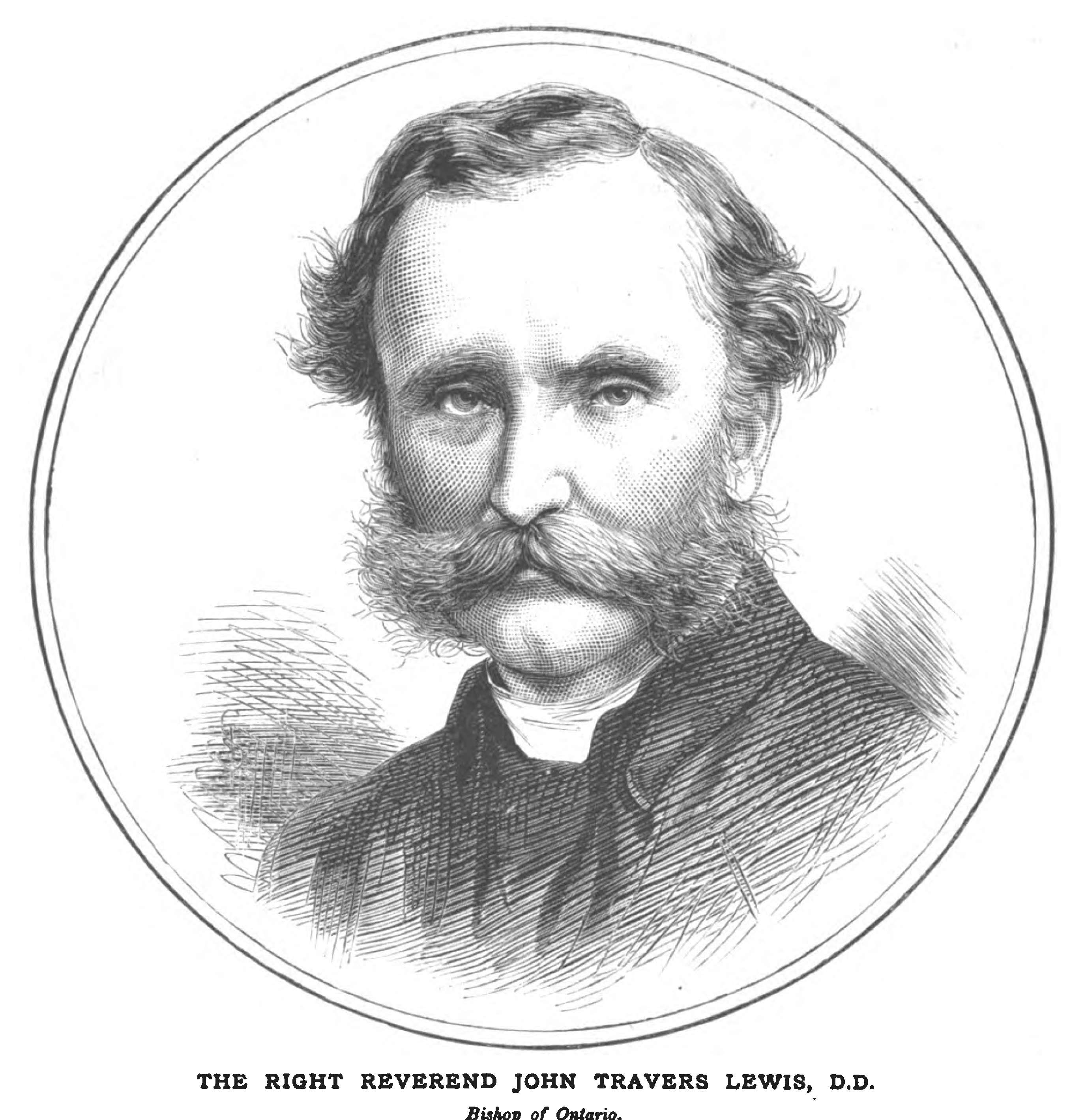
Lewis

John Travers Lewis (June 20, 1825 – May 6, 1901) was an Anglican bishop and author. He was the Archbishop of Ontario, third Metropolitan of (Eastern) Canada, and the first Bishop of Ontario.

Lewis was born at Garrycloyne Castle, near Cork, Ireland. He was the eldest son of the Reverend John Lewis of Shandon and Rebecca Olivia Lawless, who themselves were the heirs and the nephew of Colonel John Travers, esquire of Cork and the niece of the colonel's wife Rebecca Pyne, respectively.

Lewis studied at Trinity College, Dublin. He was made a Deacon in 1848 and a priest in 1849. He served as priest at Newtownbutler in County Fermanagh, before emigrating to Canada in 1849 to be with his mother, who emigrated the year earlier. He was posted to Hawkesbury and later in 1854 to Brockville. In 1861, he was appointed the first Bishop of Ontario (Kingston). In 1893, he became metropolitan of the ecclesiastical province of Canada and then Archbishop of Ontario. He resigned in 1900.

== Family ==
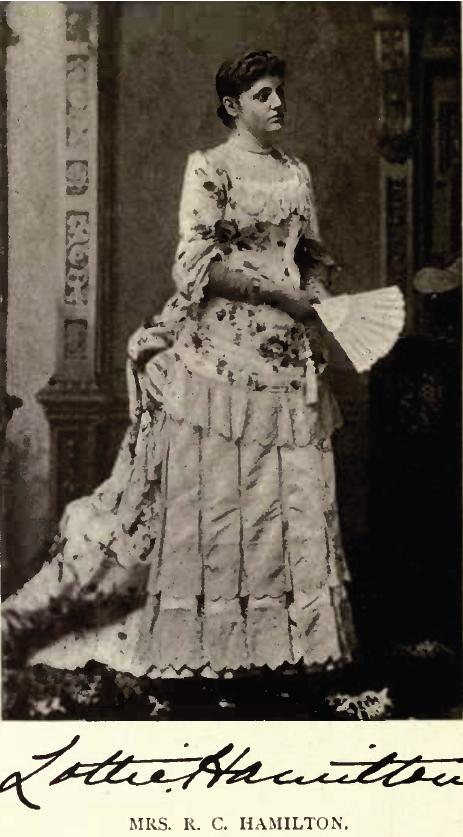
Charlotte Sherwood Hamilton (née Lewis)

John Travers Lewis married Annie Henrietta Marguerite (1830-1886), daughter of Henry Sherwood, at one time Attorney-General for Upper Canada. They had eleven children together (six of whom survived) before she died in 1886. Their son, Travers Lewis, was a barrister in Ottawa. Their eldest daughter, Charlotte Sherwood Lewis, was born at Brockville, Ontario, and educated at Toronto, Ontario. She married Robert Craigie Hamilton, son of Col. George Hamilton of Hawkesbury, Ont., at Ottawa, Ontario on April 28, 1875. Their eldest daughter (born in Montreal) married Wilfrid Sergeant. Their son served as a midshipman and Captain's A.D.C. on H.M.S. Irresistible. His daughter Eva (Evangeline) Lewis (1863–1928) became a 'lay sister' in the St James's Mission in Sedgley in Cheshire. She and militant suffragette Georgina Fanny Cheffins shared a house from some time before 1901 until the death of Lewis in 1928. The two managed to successfully evade the 1911 census.

In 1889, Travers Lewis married his second wife, Ada Maria Leigh (1840–1931), daughter of Anne Allen and Evan Leigh. She was the founder of the Ada Leigh Homes in Paris. She who wrote his biography, The Life of John Travers Lewis, D.D., First Archbishop of Ontario.

== Notes ==
Schurman, Donald M. (1994). "Lewis, John Travers". In Cook, Ramsay; Hamelin, Jean (eds.). Dictionary of Canadian Biography. Vol. XIII (1901–1910) (online ed.). University of Toronto Press.
