= Jack Creggan =

Canadian Anglican bishop

Jack Burnett Creggan was the Anglican Bishop of Ontario from 1970 until 1975.

He was educated at Queen's University, Kingston and ordained Deacon in 1927; and Priest in 1928. His first posts were curacies in Bancroft and Toronto. He then held incumbencies at Sharbot Lake, North Augusta, Picton and Prescott. He was Archdeacon of Ontario from 1953 to 1962; and then Rector of Gananoque from 1962 to 1970. He was Archdeacon of Kingston from 1969 until his elevation to the episcopate.

Religious titles
Preceded by Kenneth Charles Evans	Bishop of Ontario; 1970–1975	Succeeded by Henry Gordon Hill
