= Michael Oulton =

Canadian Anglican bishop

Michael Douglas Oulton (born 21 December 1959 in Sackville, New Brunswick) is a Canadian Anglican bishop. He was Anglican Bishop of Ontario from 2011 to 2023.

He was educated at the University of New Brunswick. After an earlier career as a lawyer he was ordained Deacon in 1992; and Priest in 1993. He was Rector of Alberton, Prince Edward Island from 1992 to 1997; and of St Peter, Kingston, Ontario from 1997 to 2004; and of Christ Church, Belleville, Ontario from 2004 to his elevation to the episcopate.

Religious titles
Preceded by George Bruce	Bishop of Ontario; 2011–2023	Succeeded by William Cliff
