= William Mills (bishop) =

The Rt Rev William Lennox Mills was Bishop of Ontario from 1901 until 1917.

Born in Woodstock, Ontario and educated at Huron College, he was ordained in 1873. His first post was at Trinity Church, Norwich, Ontario after which he was Rector of St Thomas Seaforth, Ontario. From there he became Lecturer in Ecclesiastical History at the Montreal Diocesan Theological College, a canon of Christ Church Cathedral, Montreal and finally (before his elevation to the episcopate) Archdeacon of St Andrew's, also in the Diocese of Montreal.

== Notes ==
Anglican Communion titles
Preceded by John Travers Lewis	Bishop of Ontario; 1901–1917	Succeeded by Edward John Bidwell
