= Ivor Norris =

Canadian Anglican bishop

Ivor Arthur Norris (9 July 1901 – 24 January 1969) was the second Bishop of Brandon.

He was born in Willesden Green and educated at St John's College, Winnipeg and King's College London and ordained in 1926. He began his career as Curate of All Saints, Winnipeg after which he held incumbencies in Russell and Neepawa. From 1947 to 1950 he was Archdeacon of Brandon when he became its diocesan bishop, the Bishop of Brandon – a post he held until his death. He had become a Doctor of Divinity (DD).

Anglican Communion titles
Preceded by Wilfred Thomas	Bishop of Brandon; 1950–1969	Succeeded by Thomas Wilkinson
