= Rachael Parker =

Canadian Anglican bishop

The Right Reverend Rachael Parker
- Bishop of Brandon
- Church: Anglican Church of Canada
- Province: Northern Lights
- Diocese: Brandon
- In office: 2024–present

Orders
- Ordination: May 13, 1999 (diaconate); December 7, 1999 (priesthood)
- Consecration: March 18, 2024 by Greg Kerr-Wilson

Personal details
- Education: Brescia University College (B.A.); Huron University College (M.Div.)

Rachael Louise Parker is a Canadian Anglican bishop. She has been the eighth bishop of Brandon in the Anglican Church of Canada since 2024. Prior to her election in November 2023, she was rector of a three-church rural parish in the Diocese of Edmonton, where she also served as rural ministries archdeacon. Parker also served in ordained ministry in the dioceses of Huron and Nova Scotia and Prince Edward Island. In 2021, she was a candidate for diocesan bishop in the Diocese of Edmonton.

Anglican Communion titles
Preceded by William Cliff	Bishop of Brandon; 2024–present	Incumbent
