= Brescia University College =

College in London, Ontario, Canada

Coordinates: 43°0′18.61″N 81°16′36.54″W

- Former names: Ursuline College (1919-1963); Brescia College (1963-2001)
- Motto: Choose to Lead
- Type: Public liberal arts college Women's college
- Active: 1919–2024
- Affiliations: AUCC, IAU, COU, ACU, WCC
- Religious affiliation: Roman Catholic (Ursulines)
- Academic affiliations: University of Western Ontario
- Principal: Dr. Lauretta Frederking
- Academic staff: 46
- Undergraduates: 1350 full time 200 part time
- Postgraduates: 12
- Location: 1285 Western Road; London, Ontario, Canada; N6G 1H2
- Campus: Urban
- Colours: Blue and Tangerine
- Website: www.brescia.uwo.ca

Brescia University College was a Catholic liberal arts women's college located in London, Ontario, Canada. Affiliated with the University of Western Ontario, Brescia was the last university-level women's college in Canada. It had approximately 1,500 undergraduate students and a 14:1 student/faculty ratio. Although Brescia was a Catholic institution, it accepted students of all faiths and backgrounds.

== History ==
Brescia was founded in 1919 as Ursuline College by the Ursulines, an organization of women of Catholic faith. It was originally located in an old converted house at 556 Wellington Street in downtown London, Ontario. It was founded as a Roman Catholic affiliate of the University of Western Ontario in London, Ontario, and the graduates received University of Western Ontario degrees. The first class was of seven young women who each paid $50 for tuition.

The Ursuline Superior General, Mother Clare Gaukler, bought a piece of land at 1285 Western Road in London, and construction began on a permanent building in 1923. The building was built by contractor Joseph Michael Piggot, opened for classes and residence in 1925, and was named Brescia Hall. Brescia Hall was later renamed "Ursuline Hall".

Brescia was known as a liberal arts school and the courses taught were: English, French, Spanish, Philosophy, History, Classics, and Religious Knowledge. Brescia students took other courses such as Science, Mathematics, Political Economy at Western. Over time, Brescia adapted some of the courses (e.g., Philosophy) to be appropriate for Catholic women. In 1936, a Home Economics program was begun, it evolved into what is known today as the Department of Food and Nutritional Sciences.

Ursuline College was renamed "Brescia College" in 1963, after the Italian city of Brescia where the Ursuline religious institute was founded. In 2001 it was again renamed to "Brescia University College".

In September 2007, Brescia started the first graduate program. In 2017, the college began offering a degree in non-profit management.

On September 21, 2023, Western University announced it would begin fully integrating Brescia into Western. The process would last until May 2024, whereby Brescia fully wound down and ceased operations. Western assumed all of Brescia's assets and liabilities, and will introduce a $25-million Brescia Legacy fund to support existing students who will complete their degrees under Western University. This news drew criticism from many students and faculty. On September 27, Brescia students held a rally with about 300 participants to voice their discontent with this decision. Brescia ceased operations on May 1, 2024.

== Programs ==
- Bachelor of Arts (English, French, Psychology, Sociology, Family Studies, Health Sciences, Kinesiology, Philosophy, Religious Studies, Community Development, Political Science, Human Ecology, and Leadership Studies)
- Bachelor of Management & Organizational Studies (Food Management & Marketing, Accounting, Nonprofit Management, and Consumer Behaviour)
- Bachelor of Science (Foods & Nutrition and Human Ecology)
- Master of Foods and Nutritional Sciences
- Master of Engineering in Food Processing (MEng)
- Diploma in Dietetic Education & Practical Training
- Diploma in Management Studies
- Diploma in Diversity and Families
- Certificate in Community Development
- Certificate in Diversity and Families

The Honours Bachelor of Science in Foods and Nutrition at Brescia was accredited by Dietitians of Canada, making graduates eligible to apply for dietetic internship placements.

Brescia offered a Master of Foods and Nutritional Sciences program, divided into two streams: The internship MSc stream, available to those who graduated from a programme accredited by Dietitians of Canada, combining a master's degree with an internship and graduates could write the exam needed to become a registered dietitian. The second stream was for people who were already a Registered Dietitian in Canada.

Brescia also offered a Preliminary Year, a co-educational one-year university preparatory program taught by university professors on the college campus. The college also offered an English as a Second Language programme called CultureWorks.

== Student life ==
The Preliminary Year programme and the Masters of Science were co-education; all undergraduate programs were women-only. However, all courses were accessible to UWO students, male or female, including students from Western's two other affiliated university colleges.

== Buildings ==
James Carlisle Pennington designed Brescia Hall (1924–25) for the Ursuline Sisters, near Western Road at Sarnia Road, on the campus of the University of Western Ontario. The Mother St. James memorial building (completed in 1963) was the main building on campus; it housed classrooms, offices, student services, the business office, the Beryl Ivey Library and computer lab, the Mother St. James Memorial Auditorium and The Hive. Ursuline Hall was Brescia's original building and residence, but housed classrooms, food laboratories and administrative offices before the schools closure. In September 2013, Brescia opened its new residence building and dining pavilion, Clare Hall, which continues to operate, housing just over 300 students and includes an eatery called the Mercato.

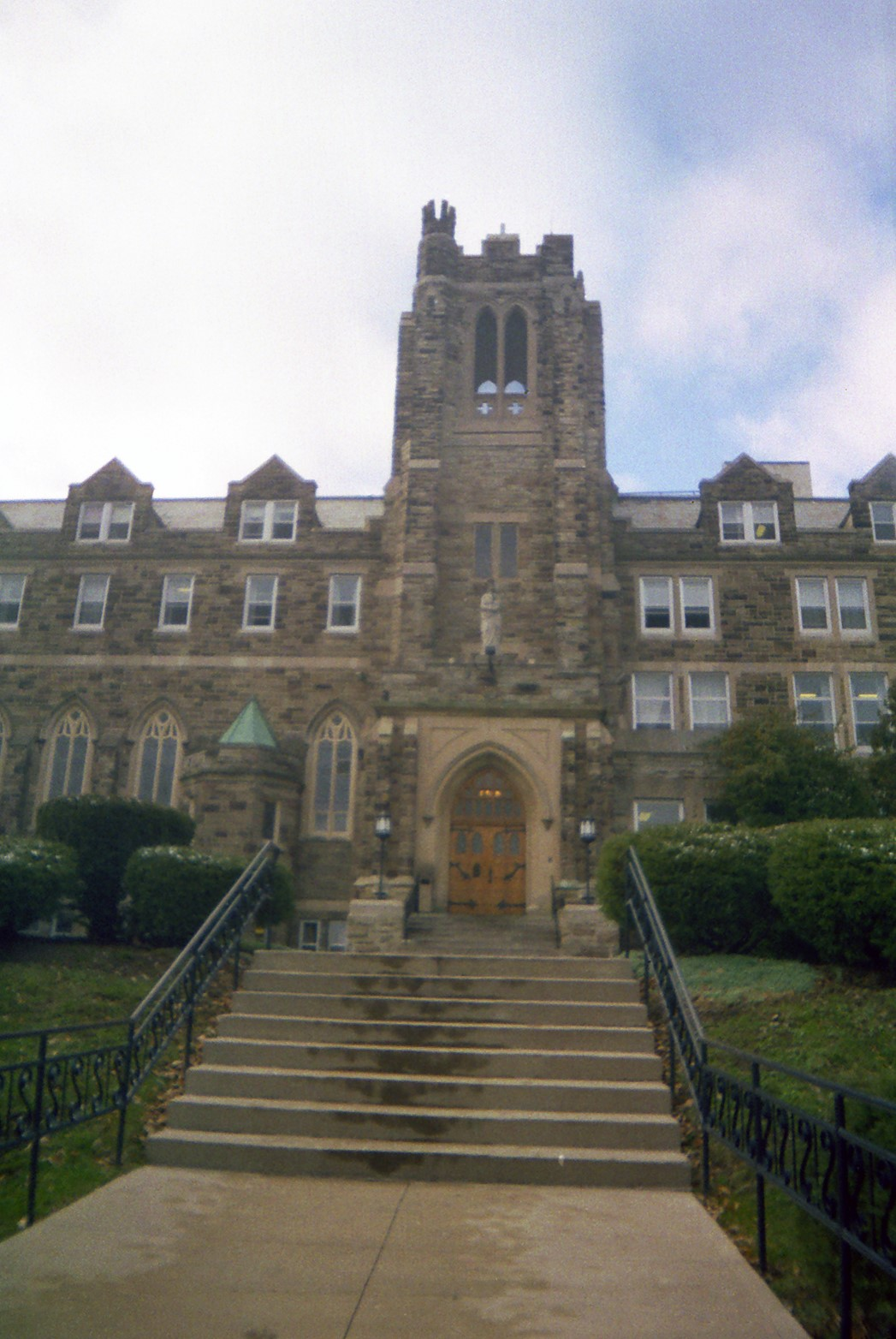
Brescia Hall

== Notable alumnae ==
- Margaret Chan - 7th Director General of the World Health Organization (BA 1973)
- Katherine Henderson - president and CEO of Curling Canada and Hockey Canada (1986)
- Beryl Ivey, CM - Philanthropist (BA 1947)
- Rachael Parker - Anglican bishop (BA 1995)

== See also ==
=== Books ===
- Murray Llewellyn Barr A century of medicine at Western: a centennial history of the Faculty of Medicine, University of Western Ontario (London: University of Western Ontario, 1977), ISBN 0-919534-00-7
- John R. W. Gwynne-Timothy Western's first century (London: University of Western Ontario, 1978)
- Ruth Davis Talman 'The beginnings and development of the University of Western Ontario, 1878–1924.' (MA Thesis, University of Western Ontario, 1925)
- Available from the Beryl Ivey Library are emeritus Professor of History Dr. Patricia Skidmore's books Brescia College 1919-1979 and The History of Brescia
