= Alan Reid (artist) =

American artist (born 1976)

Alan Reid (born 1976) is a contemporary American artist who lives in New York City.

His colored-pencil representational images of women have been described as provocatively light, "with coloring as delicate as his women are elegant".

His work includes depictions of women in everyday situations.
