= Maitland, Ontario =

Village in Ontario, Canada

Maitland
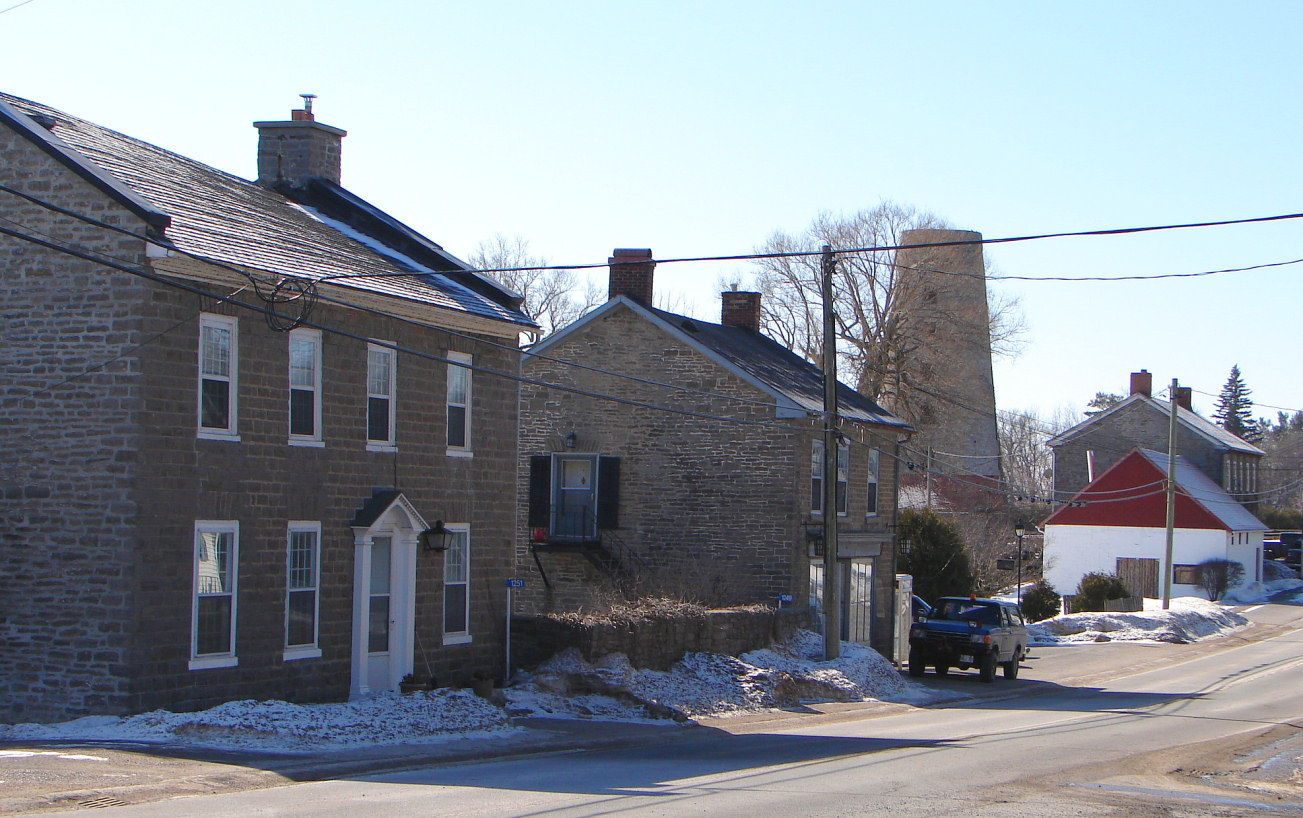
- Country Road 2 in Maitland, Ontario

- Location within United Counties of Leeds and Grenville Location within Southern Ontario
- Coordinates: 44°38′15″N 75°36′53″W
- Country: Canada
- Province: Ontario
- County: Leeds and Grenville
- Township: Augusta Township

Population (2021)
  - Total: 1,814
- Time zone: UTC−05:00 (EST)
  - Summer (DST): UTC−04:00 (EDT)
- Postal Code FSA: K0E
- Area codes: 613

Maitland, Ontario is a small village within Augusta Township in the United Counties of Leeds and Grenville, Canada. It is located along the St. Lawrence River approximately five kilometres (3 mi) east of the city of Brockville.

The village was briefly settled in the 1750s by the French, who established a shipyard and small fort here; they called this settlement Pointe au Baril. After the Battle of the Thousand Islands the French were forced out and the area was primarily settled by the British, becoming the village of Maitland. The village was named after Sir Peregrine Maitland, who was Lieutenant-Governor of Upper Canada.

The village now has mainly residential properties, with some businesses located inside the village and factories near the outskirts.

== History ==
=== French period ===
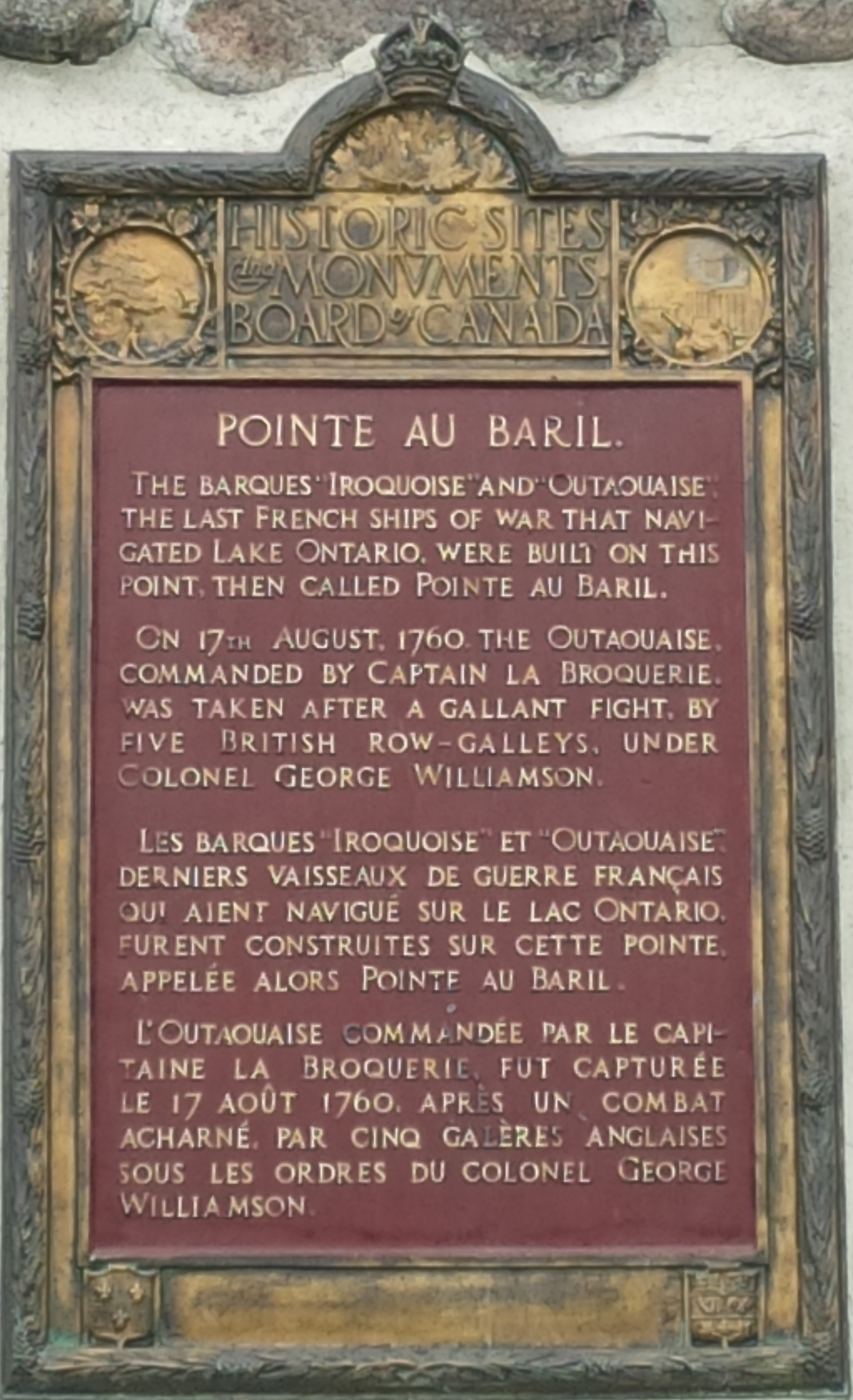
Pointe Au Baril National Historic Site

==== Background ====
The area which was to become Maitland was used occasionally by the French throughout the seventeenth and eighteenth centuries. At this time, the French had well established trading routes along the St. Lawrence from Montreal to Niagara. Initially, they referred to this area as Pointe au Pin, but since the same was already used to describe other locations, it was changed to Pointe au Baril sometime in the 18th century. Conflicts with the British left this trading system vulnerable; in 1758, British-American troops attacked Fort Frontenac (present-day Kingston), burning the fort as well as the French fleet. This action disrupted trading and left Montreal vulnerable creating a need for new ships and a new fort. Plans were drawn that year for a new shipyard and fortification to be located at Pointe au Baril.

==== Settlement and fortification ====
Located on a point, Pointe au Baril was an optimal location for both a shipyard and a fort; This location was close to the enemy's fort near present-day Ogdensburg and had excellent timber in abundance. The shipyard was constructed by 1759 along with a seven-pointed star shaped earthwork fort. Troops were summoned from Montreal to aid in the construction of new ships and improve the fortification. By spring 1759, two ships were fully constructed. On April 9, the French launched the Iroquoise followed three days later by the Outaouaise.

In 1760, the French were forced to leave their fort at Pointe au Baril when British troops invaded. General Amherst captured the fort as well as both ships. The site was left abandoned for around 20 years; the British initially made no attempt to settle initially or colonize the area. By the time the Loyalists arrived, around 1784, there was little to no evidence of the French settlement or fort; all that remained was a log building, which had once been used as officers’ quarters. The approximate site of the fort was designated a National Historic Site of Canada in 1923 and is marked by a stone cairn.

=== Loyalist settlement and early 1800s ===
After it lay abandoned for many years, Loyalists began to settle the area in the late 1700s and into the early 19th century by building homesteads, establishing businesses and opening small factories. During the early part of the century, Maitland was on the opposite end of a supply route running to Merrick's mills, which aided in its growth; additionally, the construction of the Welland Canal and other canal systems through the St. Lawrence allowed goods to be transported to and from the village. A wharf was located in Maitland at this time for collecting goods, and many mills were constructed. One of Maitland's most notable landmarks was constructed in 1828: the Longley Tower, which was originally built as a windmill along the St. Lawrence River. The tower had a brief life as a windmill, but as it did not generate enough power to sustain anything for long, it was later converted into a distillery. Longley then imported a steam engine from Europe, built a flour mill, and constructed a stone building on site out of which he ran a general store and post office; this was the beginning of the village and shortly after, a Major Charles Lemon constructed two mills, a foundry, and a blacksmith shop to serve the village as well.

In the 1830s, a Masonic hall was built to serve the community. By this time, many general stores were operating in the village. In 1833, Maitland was designated an official point of entry and years later a Customs House was built to deal with border crossings and importations.

In the early 1800s, the village boasted three hotels and taverns; the David Dunham Jones Inn, Calvin Frary Inn and the Levi Davis Inn. The stone building which was once Dunham Jones Inn is still standing, and is the second building existing as the inn; formerly, the tavern was made of timber. It is currently the oldest building in the village, constructed of stone around 1821. It is currently a private residence. The Levi David Inn was established in 1830, built of wood with blue cladding. For a brief period in the mid-1900s, the building was used as a drugstore and modernized, however, these modernizations have since been reversed. Only part of the original building still stands. The Calvin Frary Inn was constructed in 1825, later becoming the Maitland Hotel and the Dominion Hotel. Most of this from structure was demolished in 1964 to accommodate a new gas bar and general store.

=== Late 1800s – early 1900s ===
By the mid-nineteenth century, the village was home to around 200 residents. During this time, the village saw a slight decline in population and prosperity. New advancements in technology and the repeal of the Corn Laws in 1846, which ended protection for British wheat farmers and entry at lower tariffs to British markets for Canadian farmers, led to a slow down in the milling industry. Maitland was mostly at a standstill in terms of industry, with many men losing jobs, and little to no incentive existed to expand the village. By the later-1850s, the village began to pick up again with the construction of a small, Grand Trunk railway station in Maitland. According to mid-to-late nineteenth century business directories, the town still boasted the same businesses, with the addition of a butcher, a bakery, a tanner, a hemp and flax manufacturer, and a soap manufacturer. By the end of the century, a cheese factory was in operation called the Chateau Cheese Company. This factory operated out of the old customs house until the 1950s; most of the building was demolished.

The distillery was in operation until the late 1800s, when the business got into trouble with the Customs and Excise Department. Allegedly, the distillery's owner, Sherman Halliday, fled to a hotel in New York state where he later committed suicide to avoid revenue agents who were closing in on him.

== Education and schools ==
The first school in the entire township of Augusta was located in Maitland, and operated from the only building left behind from French settlement, the log officers’ quarters. This school was called the Johnstown Grammar School and was established by Loyalists. Around 1833 another school was established here known as the Maitland Academy and Boarding School; this school only prospered a short while before being moved to Mallorytown.

In the early 1800s, like most other communities within Augusta township, Maitland became its own school section when the School Act of 1843 was passed. Maitland was known as school section number three. Around 1833, the first regular elementary school, or common school, was built in the village, later titled S.S. #3 Maitland School. In 1865, this school was declared inadequate, and a new schoolhouse was constructed on the same lot of land. Augusta council approved a loan of $675 for the new S.S. #3 schoolhouse to be built, and for land to be purchased to extend the playground. The old schoolhouse became a dwelling, likely to be occupied by the school's teacher. This school was closed around the 1950s, when common schools were largely phased out and a newer, modern school was built in Maitland. Both buildings still stand, and have been converted into private residences.

In 1956, a new elementary school opened in Maitland at a cost of $100,000. The building was designed by a man named Horace Roberts, built on four acres of land slightly north of the villages centre. This school became known as Maitland Public School. The school originally consisted of four classrooms and served lower-elementary grades. Older students were bused to nearby Maynard Public School. In the years 1964 and 1968, two additional rooms, an auditorium and a staffroom complete with a kitchen were added to the structure. This modern school operated until the 2000s, when it was closed and later demolished.

Presently, no schools exist in the village of Maitland. Elementary level students living here have the option of attending Maynard Public School, which still operates within the township of Augusta, or may attend one of the elementary schools in the neighbouring city of Brockville or the town of Prescott. For post-secondary, students also have to commute to either Prescott or Brockville.

== Churches and cemeteries ==
St. James’ Anglican Church is located along Church street in Maitland. The land for this church was donated around 1826, with the church being completed the following year at a cost of $2000. The church was built by subscription, and consecrated by the Bishop of Quebec in 1830. The church is of Gothic design with stained glass windows. According to some local histories, John A. MacDonald and Edward VII are said to have visited this church. In 1927, this church bought the old Wesleyan-Methodist church across the street to be used as a parish hall. Due to the age and importance of this small church, a historical plaque was erected on site in 1971. This church is currently still in use.

The St. James’ Anglican Church has its own cemetery on site, the only cemetery located within the actual village of Maitland. This cemetery began as a pioneer cemetery, with the earliest legible stone dated March 10, 1833. A small stone crypt is located within the cemetery holding the bodies of a Rev. Richard Lewis, his wife, and his unmarried sister. According to a Lillian Collier Gray in her book titled "Maitland the Seaway Village", the keys to the three locks of the crypt were thrown into the St. Lawrence River. A notable burial in this cemetery is that of Margaret Arnold, daughter-in-law of Benedict Arnold.

The Wesleyan-Methodist church in Maitland is located on along Church street, across from the Anglican church. Currently, the church building, bought by the Anglican church 1927, is used as a parish hall. The property for the church was purchased in 1853. The original building was constructed of brick in 1854 and is now covered in grey stucco with a cement addition along the back. This church operated until 1925.

Maitland Community Reformed Church is located along Ontario Highway 2 west of the community. This church was built in 1955 by Dutch immigrant families who originally formed their congregation in Brockville; services were originally conducted in Dutch. The church is a rectangular-shaped building constructed of white brick with frosted windows. The roof of this building is steeply pitched and a large cross adorns the front of the building.

A Roman Catholic church was intended to be established in Maitland around 1965, called St. Mary's of the Seaway Parish. Boundaries were laid out and agreed upon by priests for a new chapel which was to be located on the grounds of St. Mary's College (later Grenville Christian College). The church was never constructed; however, the congregation attended services at the college chapel until 1968.
