= John Lyons (bishop) =

Canadian Anglican bishop

John Lyons (29 November 1878 - 11 June 1958) was the Anglican Bishop of Ontario, then Metropolitan of Ontario in the 20th century.

Educated at Trinity College, Toronto, he was the incumbent vicar at Plevna and then rector of Burritts Rapids. He held further positions at Elizabethtown, Picton, Belleville and Prescott. He was appointed Archdeacon of Frontenac in 1930 and Bishop of Ontario in 1932; and, for his last three years in office (1949 to 1952), the Metropolitan of Ontario.

Church of England titles
Preceded by Charles Allen Seager	Bishop of Ontario; 1932–1952	Succeeded by Kenneth Charles Evans
Preceded by Charles Allen Seager	Metropolitan of Ontario; 1949–1952	Succeeded by Robert John Renison
