= Alan Reid (footballer, born 1956) =

Australian rules footballer

Personal information
- Full name: Alan Arthur Reid
- Born: 29 January 1956 (age 70)
- Original team: Coorow
- Height: 185 cm (6 ft 1 in)
- Weight: 81 kg (179 lb)

Playing career^{1}
Years	Club	Games (Goals)
1973–1978	East Fremantle	105 (90)
1979–1983	Essendon	45 (18)
1983	Geelong	7 (0)
- ^{1} Playing statistics correct to the end of 1983.

Alan Arthur Reid (born 29 January 1956) is a former Australian rules footballer who played with Essendon and Geelong in the Victorian Football League (VFL). He also played for East Fremantle in the Western Australian National Football League (WANFL).

Reid, who came from Coorow, was a member of East Fremantle's 1974 premiership team. Reid began his professional career at 17 years old. He represented Western Australia in an interstate fixture against Victoria at Subiaco Oval in 1977, which they won by 94 points, to record their first ever "State of Origin" victory.

A wingman, Reid had a strong debut season at Essendon in 1979, when he averaged over 20 disposals from his 16 appearances and polled nine Brownlow Medal votes. Only Terry Daniher polled more votes for Essendon that year. Injury restricted him to seven games in 1980, but he was a regular again in 1981, playing 18 games. His only appearances in 1982 came late in the season, due to an ankle injury. In 1983 he played only in round two, then got a clearance to Geelong, where he played seven games. He finished his VFL career on 52 games. Despite Essendon making the finals in three seasons that Reid played, 1979, 1981 and 1982, he never got to participate in a finals series.

He moved to China in 1985 and has lived there since. A University of Western Australia graduate, Reid worked at the Australian Embassy in Beijing as Minister Commercial and Senior Trade Commissioner then at Fosters China Limited as chief operating officer, during the 1990s. He is currently the managing director of Intercedent (Beijing) Ltd.
