= Kenneth Evans (bishop of Ontario) =

Canadian Anglican bishop

Kenneth Charles Evans (1903–1970) was the Anglican Bishop of Ontario from 1952 until his death.

He was born on 4 May 1903, Shunqing, Nanchong, Sichuan, western China and educated at the University of Toronto. He was ordained Deacon in 1930; and Priest in 1931. His early posts were at Lloydtown, Schomberg, Kettleby and Nobleton. He was a lecturer at Trinity College, Toronto from 1934 to 1940; and Dean of Divinity from 1940 to 1944. He was Dean of Montreal from 1944 until his elevation to the episcopate.

He died on 13 February 1970.

Religious titles
Preceded by John Lyons	Bishop of Ontario; 1952–1970	Succeeded by Jack Creggan
