= Alan Reid (cricketer) =

Australian cricketer

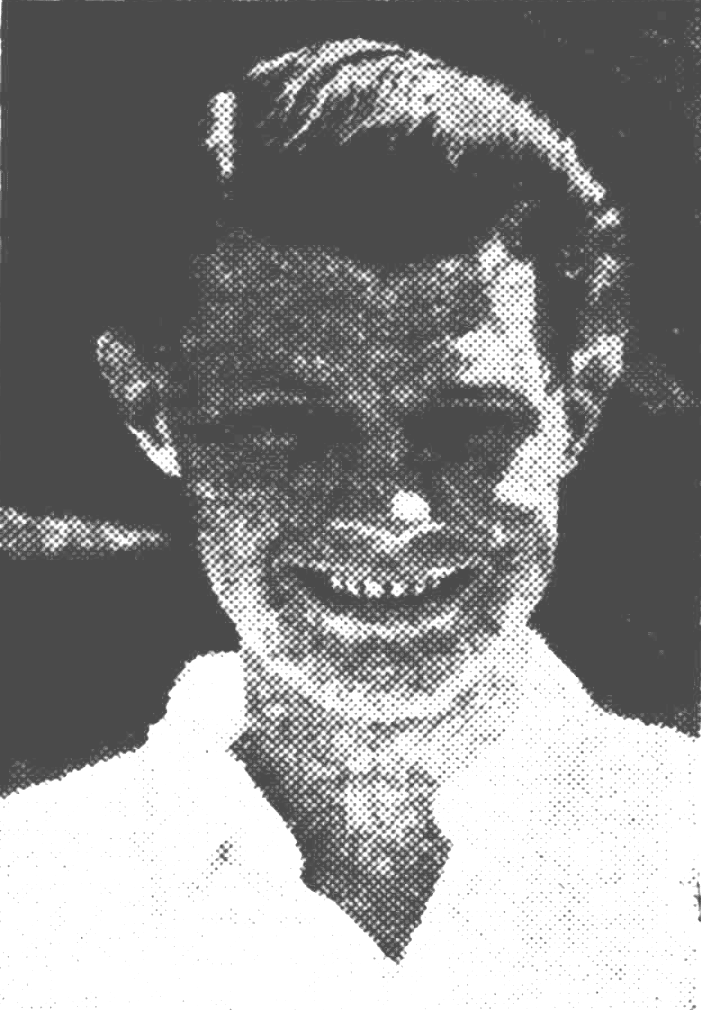

Personal information
- Born: 30 June 1931; Maryborough, Queensland, Australia
- Died: 9 May 2012 (aged 80)
- Source: Cricinfo, 6 October 2020

Alan Walter Reid (30 June 1931 - 9 May 2012) was an Australian cricketer. He played in one first-class match for Queensland in 1957/58. He also played for Maryborough.

== See also ==
- List of Queensland first-class cricketers
