= Alan Reid (footballer, born 1926) =

Australian rules footballer

Personal information
- Full name: Alan Reid
- Born: 14 December 1926
- Died: 16 October 1988 (aged 61)
- Height: 175 cm (5 ft 9 in)
- Weight: 80 kg (176 lb)

Playing career^{1}
Years	Club	Games (Goals)
1951	Geelong	2 (0)
- ^{1} Playing statistics correct to the end of 1951.

Alan Reid (14 December 1926 – 16 October 1988) was an Australian rules footballer who played for the Geelong Football Club in the Victorian Football League (VFL).
