= Diocese of Ontario =

Diocese of the Anglican Church in Canada

Coordinates: 44°13′46″N 76°28′59″W

Location
- Country: Canada
- Ecclesiastical province: Ontario

Statistics
- Parishes: 46 (2022)
- Members: 5,896 (2022)

Information
- Denomination: Anglican Church of Canada
- Rite: Anglican
- Cathedral: St. George's Cathedral, Kingston

Current leadership
- Bishop: William Cliff

Map
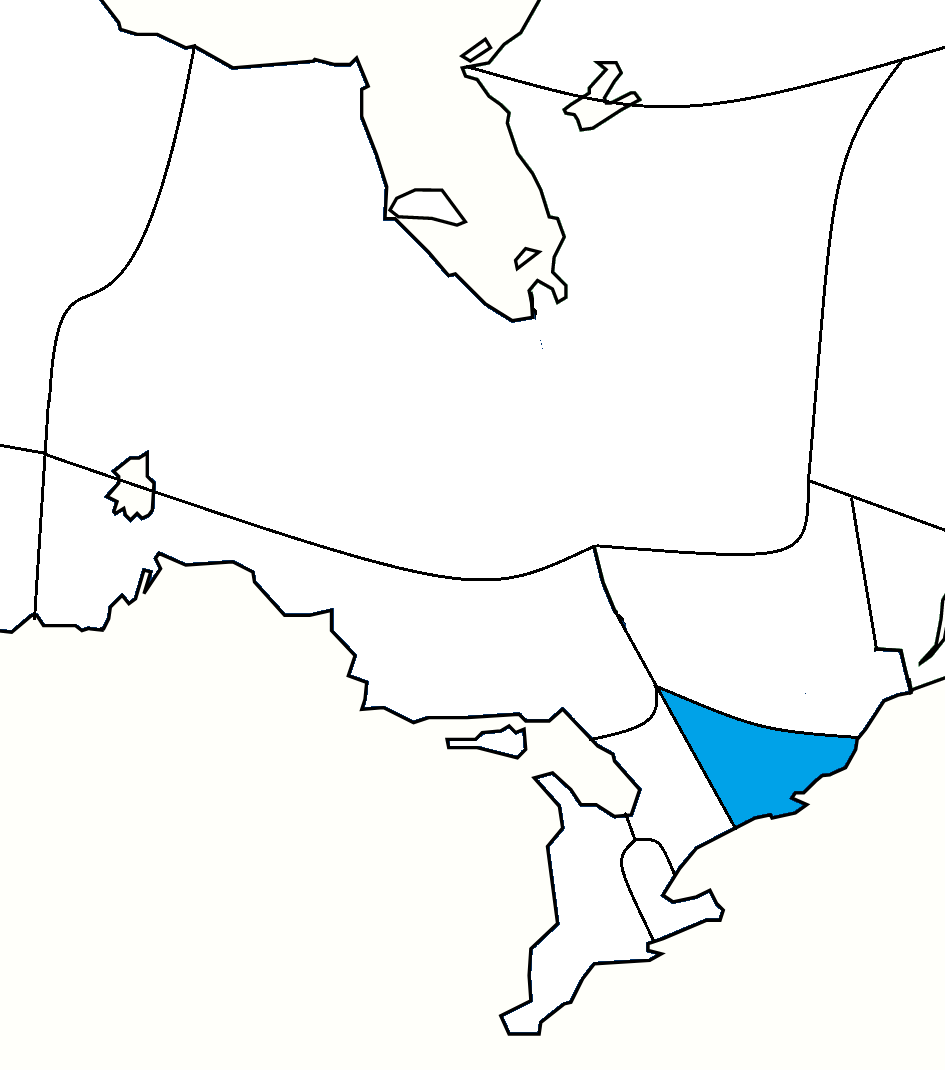
- The boundaries of the diocese within the Ecclesiastical Province of Ontario.

Website
- ontario.anglican.ca

The Diocese of Ontario is a diocese of the Ecclesiastical Province of Ontario of the Anglican Church of Canada, itself a province of the Anglican Communion. Its See city is Kingston, Ontario, and its cathedral is St. George's, Kingston. The diocese is not coterminous with the Canadian civil province of Ontario, but rather encompasses approximately 17,700 square kilometres of it, comprising the counties of Prince Edward, Hastings, Lennox and Addington, Frontenac, and Leeds and Grenville. Apart from Kingston, other major centres included in the diocese are Belleville, Brockville, and Trenton. The diocese ministers to approximately 8,500 Anglicans in 45 parishes.

The diocese was founded in 1862, when it was divided from the Diocese of Toronto. In 1866, there was one archdeacon: H. Patton, Archdeacon of Ontario. Until 1896 it included the present-day Diocese of Ottawa. Its first bishop, John Lewis, a Church of Ireland cleric, was the first bishop consecrated in Canada rather than England.

The present bishop is the Right Reverend William Cliff, and the cathedral dean is the Very Reverend Douglas Michael.

== Controversy ==
Since the 1980s there has been media reporting of criminal cases and civil lawsuits in the Diocese concerning child abuse allegations by Anglican clergy and staff, and allegations of Corruption by Diocesan officials in Judy Steed's book, "Our Little Secret" in the chapter on the corruption. Most recently, one of Canada's national networks, CTV Television Network, aired a documentary film on the[ W5] programme focused on Grenville Christian College called "In the Name of God", which was released on February 6, 2016, along with the launch of the book, "Grenville", by Andrew J. Hale-Byrne. This latest media reporting on CTV highlighted the close relationship between the Community of Jesus and Grenville Christian College. The Toronto Star followed up this reporting on February 29, 2016.

Former students of Grenville Christian College filed a class action suit against the school, the diocese and a number of individuals. The action against the Diocese of Ontario was dismissed by Judge Perell in March 2013 while continuing against others. This dismissal was based on "no evidence of any direct involvement by Diocese at school in various abuses or even having received complaints of abuse at any material time. Relationship between Diocese and student was too remote to fairly impose duty of care. It was plain and obvious Diocese had no legally prescribed duty of care to students of school. There was no reasonable cause of action in negligence against Diocese. Claim for vicarious liability against Diocese was untenable. There was no evidence Diocese had employer-employee relationship with other defendants. It was plain and obvious there was no fiduciary relationship between students and Diocese" (http://www.lawtimesnews.com/Ontario-Civil/CLASS-ACTIONS).

Previously, Judy Steed wrote in her book "Our Little Secret: Confronting Child Sexual Abuse in Canada" about child abuse that had taken place in the St George's Cathedral. " " " " " "

It has been reported in the press that a Bishop of the Diocese, Peter Mason, visited and met with an organization based in Massachusetts called the Community of Jesus to discuss Grenville Christian College. Bishop Henry Gordon Hill' obituary states that he was the Episcopal Visitor of the Community of Jesus in Cape Cod, MA and had close connections with the Grenville Christian College in Brockville, ON. Hill, who was Bishop of the Anglican Diocese of Ontario, was criticized for ordaining The Rev. Charles Farnworth, Headmaster of Grenville Christian College, without the typical Anglican higher education and seminary training as specifically stated in the Globe and Mail newspaper in an articled titled "Mothers of Invention" by Michael Valpy. Both were previously ordained in other denominations.

The Ontario Provincial Police criminal investigation into abuse by former staff and members of the Community of Jesus is ongoing. The Crown laid their first charges on October 6, 2016, for sexual assault. Robert Farnsworth, member of the Community of Jesus and former member of Grenville Christian College staff, was arrested on October 5, 2016. Robert Farnsworth is also the son of The Rev. Charles Farnsworth, late Grenville headmaster, and brother of Donald Farnsworth, member of the Community of Jesus and former Grenville Christian College Dean of Boys. " Robert Farnsworth was acquitted of the charges on February 13, 2018 "

== Bishops of Ontario ==
1. John Lewis, 1862-1901 (4th Metropolitan of Canada, 1893–1900)
2. William Mills, 1901–1917
3. Edward Bidwell, 1917-1926 (previously coadjutor bishop and suffragan Bishop of Ontario since 1913)
4. Charles Seager, 1926–1932 (afterwards Bishop of Huron, 1932–1948)
5. John Lyons, 1932–1952 (also 8th Metropolitan of Ontario, 1949–1952)
6. Kenneth Evans, 1952–1970
7. Jack Creeggan, 1970–1975
8. Henry Hill, 1975–1981
9. Allan Read, 1981–1992
10. Peter Mason, 1992–2002
11. George Bruce, 2002–2011
12. Michael Oulton, 2011–2023
13. William Cliff, 2023–present
