= Allan Read =

Canadian Anglican bishop (1923–2003)

Allan Alexander Read (19 September 1923 – 15 November 2003) was the Anglican Bishop of Ontario from 1981 until 1992.

He was educated at Trinity College, Toronto and ordained Deacon in 1948; and Priest in 1949. He was the incumbent at St. John, Mono Mills, Ontario. Next he became Rector, Trinity Church, Barrie. He was Archdeacon of Simcoe from 1961 to 1972. Allan was elected and consecrated Suffragan Bishop of Toronto in 1972. In 1981, he was elected and enthroned Diocesan Bishop of the Diocese of Ontario, serving until his retirement in 1992.

Religious titles
Preceded by Henry Hill	Bishop of Ontario; 1981–1992	Succeeded by Peter Ralph Mason
