= St. Matthew's Anglican Cathedral (Brandon, Manitoba) =

Coordinates: 49.8434°N 99.9550°W

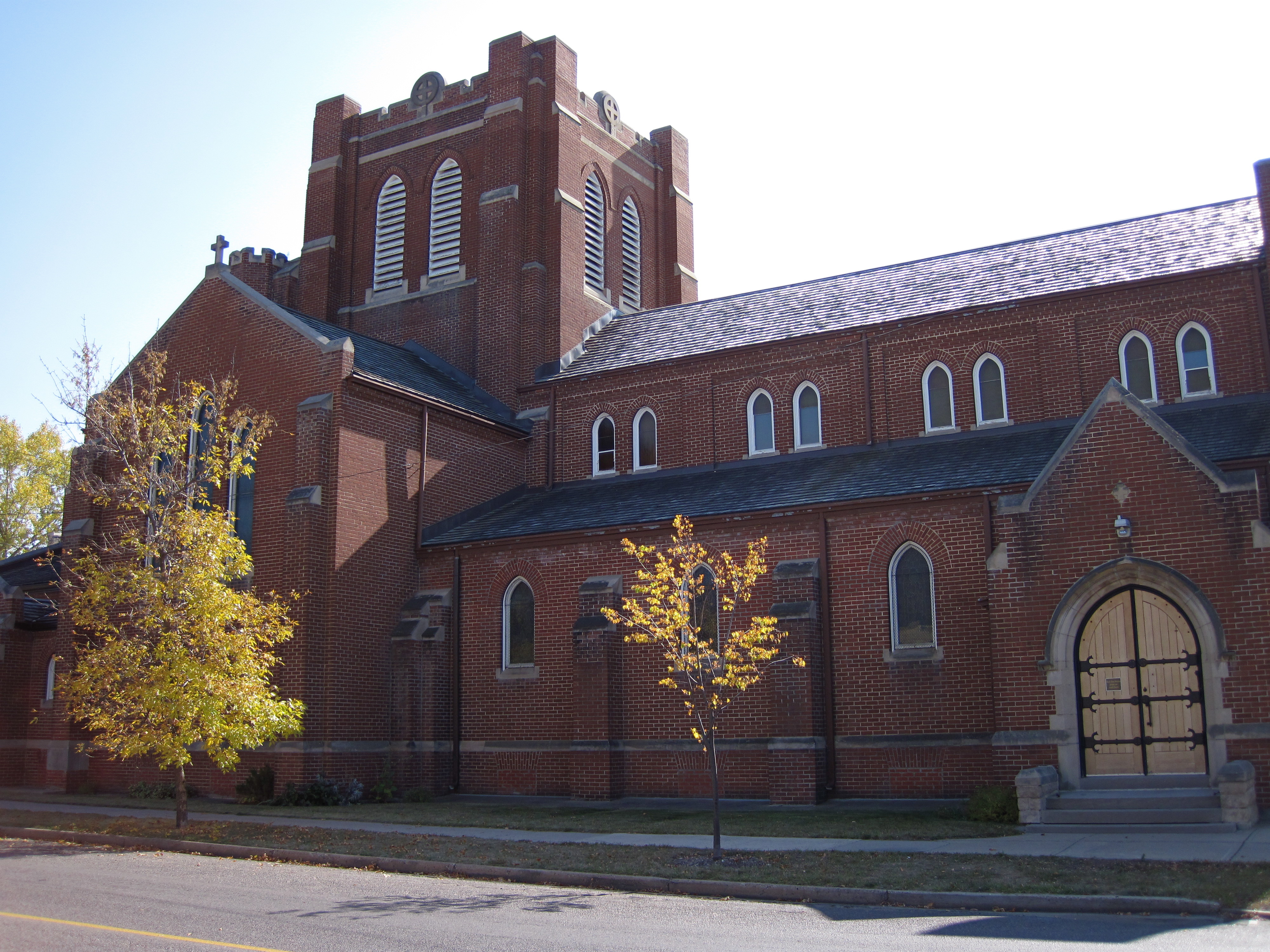
- St. Matthew's Anglican Cathedral
- St. Matthew's Anglican Cathedral
- Location: Brandon, Manitoba
- Country: Canada
- Denomination: Anglican

History
- Status: Cathedral

Architecture
- Functional status: Active
- Architect: W.A. (William Alexander) Elliott,
- Architectural type: Norman-Gothic
- Style: Gothic Revival
- Groundbreaking: 1912
- Completed: 1913

Administration
- Diocese: Brandon

Clergy
- Dean: Christopher Evetts

St. Matthew's Cathedral, located in Brandon, Manitoba, is the seat of the Anglican Diocese of Brandon. The cathedral church is located in a residential neighbourhood on 13th Street near Victoria Avenue.

The cathedral church hosts numerous concerts and events, both secular and religious, which are held throughout the year. The current Rector and Dean is the Very Reverend Christopher Evetts.

== Architecture ==
St. Matthew's was built in between 1912 and 1913 to designs by Brandon architect W.A. (William Alexander) Elliott, whose name is on other designated heritage buildings in Brandon such as Johnson House, Christie House, and the Central Firehall. Designed in English Gothic Revival style, and constructed by the firm of William Bell and Son, the cathedral is a red brick and limestone building, with a complex floor plan, variety of roof lines, crenelations and tall lancet windows. The central tower is located at the crossing and is the focal point of the building. Inside, the cathedral is elegant, with Gothic inspired windows and furnishings, all beautifully maintained.

The Institute for stained glass in Canada has documented the stained glass at St Matthew's Anglican Cathedral, which includes a memorial to the RMS Titanic.
