= Alan Read =

British writer

Professor Alan Read
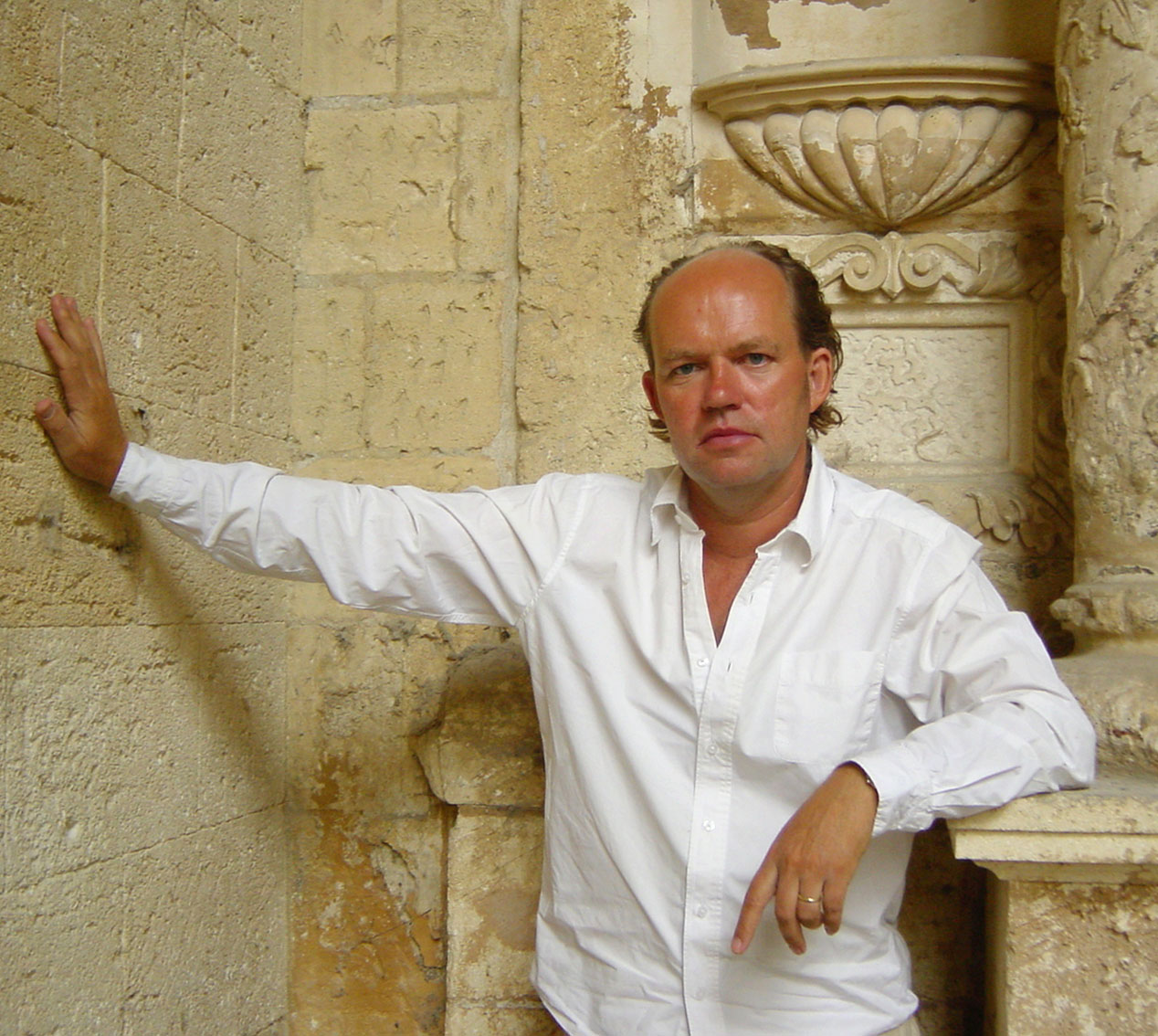
- Read in 2007
- Born: 21 September 1956 (age 70); Southend-on-Sea, United Kingdom
- Education: University of Exeter (BA); University of Washington (PhD)
- Occupation: Professor of theatre
- Employer: King's College London

Alan Read (born 21 September 1956) is a writer and professor of theatre at King's College London. He is recognised as a theatre theorist and cultural activist, with scholarly interests in ethics and the everyday, performed communities, event architecture, and the subjectivities of capitalism.

Read's work serves as a critique of modernist theatrical orthodoxy, critically contesting Peter Brook's idealism of the "empty space"—a tabula rasa awaiting its theatre, where professionals may enter and exit at will. Contrary to this notion, Read argues that theatre has been superseded in that populated place by the quotidian performances of everyday life, which persist for both good and ill.

He presented this critique on the stage of the National Theatre in London in 1994, engaging in a public dialogue with Brook's space designer, Jean-Guy Lecat. Read's scepticism regarding the colonial fantasy of theatre's "empty space" aligns with other critics, most notably Rustom Bharucha in Theatre & The World (1993).

== Life ==
Born in Southend-on-Sea, Read was the posthumous child of William Alan Read and Veronica Read. He was educated at Westcliff High School for Boys before obtaining a bachelor's degree from the University of Exeter in 1979.

Between 1979 and 1981, he pursued a PhD at the University of Washington, Seattle, and was awarded his doctorate in 1989. During this period, he spent a decade working at the Rotherhithe Theatre Workshop in the Docklands area of South East London.

Read is the partner of artist Beryl Robinson.

== Career ==
Read is the author of Theatre & Everyday Life: An Ethics of Performance (1993), Theatre, Intimacy & Engagement: The Last Human Venue (2008), Theatre in the Expanded Field: Seven Approaches to Performance (2014), Theatre & Law (2016), and The Dark Theatre: A Book About Loss (2020).

During his tenure as director of the Talks programme at the Institute of Contemporary Arts in London during the "height of theory" in the 1990s, Read edited two volumes: The Fact of Blackness: Frantz Fanon and Visual Representation (1996), which included original artwork by Steve McQueen, and Architecturally Speaking: Practices of Art, Architecture and the Everyday (2000).

Read taught at Dartington College of Arts in the 1980s, coordinating the Council of Europe Workshop on Theatre and Communities with Colette King and Peter Hulton from 1981 to 1983. He also worked at the Rotherhithe Theatre Workshop with David Slater throughout the remainder of the decade.

In the early 1990s, he moved to Barcelona, where he wrote about street ceremonies, including gegants, castells, and correfoc (human-dragon fire runners). During this period, he completed the monograph Theatre & Everyday Life (1993), which documents these ethnographies of the everyday and their relationship to risk and safety.

In 1993, Read curated the London International Festival of Theatre (LIFT) Daily Dialogues, a series of 21 public seminars featuring artists, theorists, and theatre companies participating in the festival programme. He continued this work biennially for successive LIFT festivals over the next decade, culminating in the day-long symposium Voice Ruin Play (2001), which brought together Romeo Castellucci and Societas Raffaello Sanzio with key figures from the UK theatre community for the first time.

Read was appointed Director of Talks at the Institute of Contemporary Arts (ICA) in the mid-1990s, working alongside Helena Reckitt. Together, they curated and chaired more than 500 public talks over four years, featuring key figures in the cultural field, including philosophers Jacques Derrida, Jean Baudrillard, Judith Butler, and Alphonso Lingis; race theorists Homi Bhabha, Bell hooks, and Paul Gilroy; musicians Laurie Anderson, Mark E Smith, and Patti Smith; novelists Bret Easton Ellis, Nadine Gordimer, SE Hinton, Laurie Moore, and Tahar Ben Jelloun; film directors Alejandro Jodorowsky, Raul Ruiz, and Wong Kar-wai; artists Mary Kelly, Vija Celmins, John Currin, and Orlan; cultural theorists Beatriz Colomina, John Berger, and Sander Gilman; and urban theorists Doreen Massey, Richard Sennett, and Edward Soja.

The talks series curated during this period, including Spaced Out (architecture), Addressing Dressing (fashion), Uncanny Encounters (psychoanalytic theory), The Scapegoat (cultural theory), Incarcerated with Artaud and Genet (theatrical archaeology), and Working with Fanon (race and radical psychiatry), influenced public engagement with cultural theory throughout the 1990s. This work also contributed to the development of the "talks" industry, later seen in institutions such as Tate Modern, the Institute of Ideas, The School of Life, TED, and Intelligence Squared.

In 1997, Read was appointed the first Professor of Theatre at Roehampton Institute (later Roehampton University) and, in 2006, became the first Professor of Theatre in the 180-year history of King's College London. At King's College, Read established the Performance Foundation, conceived and developed the Anatomy Theatre & Museum in collaboration with the Centre for e-Research (2010), planned and oversaw the construction of the Inigo Rooms in the East Wing of Somerset House with the support of King's Business (2012), and initiated King's Cultural Partners, which later became King's Cultural Institute under the directorship of Deborah Bull (2012).

Read was awarded an Honorary Fellowship by Dartington College of Arts in 2003, an Arts and Humanities Research Board five-year Major Award (2000–2005), and a Leverhulme Major Award (2010–2013). He also mentored the final cohort of AHRC Creative Fellowships alongside Greg Whelan of Lone Twin (2011–2016) and secured an EPSRC three-year Bridging the Gaps Award in collaboration with Mark Miodownik and the King's Material Library (2011–2014).

Read is a Faculty Professor at the University of California, Berkeley, where he established the annual London Theatre Capital Programme. Since 1991, he has also been an affiliated Professor at Boston University, teaching theatre students across campuses in the United States.

== Artistic collaborations ==
Read has collaborated with theatre companies including Het Werkteater, Societas Raffaello Sanzio, Forced Entertainment, and Goat Island, as well as organisations such as Battersea Arts Centre, Forster & Heighes, the curatorial producers Artangel, and the artist-activist collective Platform. These long-term relationships have encompassed advocacy, infrastructural support, advisory roles, curation of talks, and fostering engagement between theatre makers, academia, and the public realm.

Read has performed with William Pope.L as part of The Frequently Asked, curated by Tim Etchells and Adrian Heathfield at Tanzquartier Vienna in 2007. He designed the sound work for Massimo Bartolini's The Human Voices, a site-specific piece in a disused 1939 ENAL pool in Vercelli, Italy, as part of PSi Affective Archives in 2010.

Read has also created lecture performances, such as The Poor Law to mark the centenary of Daniel Paul Schreber's death at Castle Sonnenstein on the River Elbe in 2011, and read his unreliable memoir The White Estuary: Man with the Reason of History Missing over three six-hour sessions as part of PSi 18 in Leeds (2012). He participated in Tuija Kokkonen's all-night performance Chronopolitics with Dogs and Trees at Stanford University in 2013, and occupied Tate Modern with his performance teach-in The English Garden Effect as part of the climate crisis Deadline Festival in 2015.

Further works include exchanging public correspondence with philosopher Cecilia Sjöholm for the TOPublic Festival in 2016, and turning the institution of the lecture inside out for Justyna Scheuring's performance The Past Is Ahead of Us at King's College London in 2016.

In addition to his performances, Read is an essayist and reader for radio broadcasts, including for BBC Radio 4's Plato's Cave (2012), Dreadful Trade (2014), and Soul Estuary (2016), produced by Sarah Blunt with sound by Chris Watson.

Since 2018, Read has been maintaining a daily chronicle (and critical dialogue with interlocutors) of London's cultural life (and Drôme rural life) in the form of micro-commentaries, initially on Twitter and later on X, accessible at @readalanread.

== Influence ==
In support of radical inclusion in the field, Read's work simultaneously engages theoretical study, performance practices, and pedagogic commitments. Steve Tompkins of the architectural practice Haworth Tompkins has recognised the significance of Read's concepts of the everyday, cultural accretion, and event ghosting in their winning submissions for the Royal Court Theatre and Young Vic Theatre in London.

Tompkins has written: "Read has been an excellent sounding board, a provocative collaborator, an encouraging enthusiast, and a constructive critic for my work." Indeed, what Susannah Clapp of The Observer has described as "Tompkinsesque" characteristics of theatrical design could be said to share significant features with Read's long-running concerns with the archaeologies of site and the theatre as a memory machine.

The Homo Novus Festival in Riga adopted Read's concept of "The Last Human Venue" as an overarching curatorial theme for their 2013 international festival. Artists including Monika Pormale, Nomadi, and Valters Sillis responded to Read's idea of performance at the end of its ecological tether, measuring humanity's distance from inevitable extinction.

The Chicago-based company Every House Has A Door adopted Read's concept of Abandoned Practices, which itself draws on the work of Isabelle Stengers on eliminativism, in an annual summer school in Prague and Chicago, as well as a project website, www.abandonedpractices.org.

The artist/activist group Platform, as well as filmmakers Desperate Optimists, have both responded to Read's conception of "civility" and the problematic question of the "civic centre," with work across a variety of media, including peripatetic performance and film.

Read's work is anthologised and widely referenced, including Lizbeth Goodman's inclusion of Theatre & Everyday Life in The Routledge Reader in Politics and Performance (2000), followed by subsequent work on definitions of performance in Adrian Heathfield's Live: Art and Performance (2004), the miniature and the infra-thin in Richard Gough's A Performance Cosmology (2006), friendship in Lone Twin's Good Luck Everybody (2013), vegetal life in Patricia Vieira's The Green Thread (2015), repetition in Eirini Kartsaki's On Repetition (2016), and the financialisation of childhood in Performance Research: On Childhood (2017).

Read's work is frequently cited by key figures in the field, who both critique and reference his ideas. Shannon Jackson highlights Read's concepts of "re-association and reassembly" (after Bruno Latour) in Social Works (2011), while Nigel Thrift adopts Read's coinage of "showciology" in The Transformation of Contemporary Capitalism (2009). Joe Kelleher considers Read's conception of politics in Theatre & Politics (2009), Hansen and Kozel discuss Read's approach to ethics in Embodied Imagination (2007), and Nicholas Ridout reflects on Read's theory of theatrical failure in Stage Fright, Animals and Other Theatrical Problems (2006).

== Recent work ==
Read's more recent work on theatrical 'immunity', which reverses the communitarian presumption of performance, might be considered a logical inversion of the tenets of Theatre & Everyday Life rather than a negation of them. In this work, Read challenges those with investments in the terminologies of social theatre, community theatre, and political theatre to engage with more nuanced distinctions between aesthetic, cultural, and political priorities.

Read figures the ‘emaciated spectator' in critical relation to Jacques Rancière's voluntaristic ‘emancipated spectator', measuring their distance from others in the audience and assessing their relations with the immersive event that seeks their submission to its spectacle. This agency of measurement is always operable in relation to an ending: aesthetic (the show always ends) and ecological (human extinction is inevitable). This invites Read to describe the theatre as ‘the last human venue'.

Read's gently cynical tone, particularly in his widespread reviewing of the work of leading figures in the field, such as Richard Schechner and Peggy Phelan, Tracy Davies and Susan Bennett, Ric Knowles, and monumental productions like The Sultan's Elephant by Royal de Luxe, has both teased and challenged those with cultural capital, seeking to uncover the humour in a discipline that has profited greatly from others' labours. These reviews have led the writer Caridad Svich to describe Read as 'inimitable'.

Read has attracted less benign responses for his longstanding polemical critique of identity politics that fall short of intersectional ambitions. Read maintains that ‘radical particularity' inadvertently obscures the politically inclusive urgency of a ‘general theory' of class disempowerment. Equally, his work on ‘pseudo-action', the deceptive, voluntaristic vocabulary of theatre wish-fulfilling its social and political purpose in place of slower but more honest political agency, has been forcefully countered by several commentators, the most prominent of whom is Janelle Reinelt, in her valedictory lecture to the field at Warwick University in 2015, ‘What I Came to Say' (2015). In turn, Read responds to these claims of political retreat in his keynote at the Performance Philosophy Convention at the Prague Academy in 2017, ‘The Dark Theatre: Ethnographies of the Capitalocene', in which he retraces his steps over three decades of political and theatrical commitment to the neighbourhood and dockland warehouse where his thinking about everyday life and theatre were grounded.

== Bibliography ==
- (1984) An Educational Theatre Project: The Shadow of Theatre.' Dartington: Theatre Papers/Arts Archives.
- (1984) Het Werkteater: An Actors' Cooperative. Dartington: Theatre Papers/Arts Archives
- (1993) Theatre & Everyday Life: An Ethics of Performance. London: Routledge.
- (1994) Peter Brook: Platform Papers. London: National Theatre.
- (1996) The Fact of Blackness: Frantz Fanon and Visual Representation. Seattle: Bay Press.
- (2000) Architecturally Speaking: Practices of Art, Architecture and the Everyday. London: Routledge.
- (2000) On Animals. London: Taylor and Francis
- (2003) Epitaph: Societas Raffaello Sanzio. Milan: Ubu Libri.
- (2004) On Civility. London: Taylor and Francis.
- (2008) Theatre, Intimacy & Engagement: The Last Human Venue. Houndmills: Palgrave.
- (2014) Theatre in the Expanded Field: Seven Approaches to Performance. London: Bloomsbury.
- (2016) Theatre & Law. Houndmills: Palgrave.
- (2020) The Dark Theatre: A Book About Loss. Abingdon: Routledge.
