= Community of Jesus =

Charismatic and ecumenical monastery in Orleans, Massachusetts

Coordinates: 41.799071°N 70.006599°W

Church of the Transfiguration at the Community of Jesus

The Community of Jesus is an ecumenical Christian double monastery in the Benedictine tradition, which is located near Rock Harbor, in Orleans, Massachusetts, on Cape Cod.

As of 2012, approximately 225 professed members, together with another fifty children and young people lived as households in thirty privately owned, multifamily homes that surround the church and the guesthouse. This also includes the twenty-five celibate brothers who are living in the Zion Friary and the sixty celibate sisters who are living in the Bethany Convent. Altogether, the Community of Jesus consists of almost 275 people, from many walks of life and various church backgrounds—including Catholic, Presbyterian, Episcopalian, Congregational, Baptist, Lutheran, Anglican, Methodist, and Pentecostal.

Paraclete Press, the publishing arm of the Community of Jesus, has published many works by resident priest Martin Shannon CJ, who stated to media, in 2006, that "worship and liturgy are at the core of everyday life" of the Benedictine community.

== History ==
The origins of the Community of Jesus can be traced back to the first meeting of two Episcopal laywomen, Cay Andersen and Judy Sorensen, who met in 1958 at the Church of the Holy Spirit in Orleans. The two women began a ministry of prayer and Bible study, meeting in the living room of what was then Rock Harbor Manor, a bed and breakfast run by Andersen and her husband, overlooking Cape Cod Bay. In the early 1960s, Cay and Judy were invited to lead retreats in churches throughout New England. The Community of Jesus was incorporated under Massachusetts state law in 1970. Rock Harbor Manor was renovated and converted into a retreat house called "Bethany".

For a period of time beginning in 1973, three sisters from the community sang Gregorian chants at morning services at the Heydon Chapel in Sandys, Bermuda. Basil B. Elmer, a prominent member of the Community of Jesus and husband of Isabel Lincoln, great-granddaughter of William Rockefeller, was a board member of the Heydon Trust from 1975 to 1985, and Chairman until he stepped down in 2006. One of their daughters became a nun in the Community of Jesus. The sisters returned to Massachusetts sometime prior to 2012.

The Episcopal bishop of Massachusetts declined to designate the group an Episcopal community, based on a 1981 study commissioned by the Boston Presbytery, which characterized the community as a "charismatic fellowship" and found "...evidence that involvement with and within the Community of Jesus [was] incompatible with Presbyterian commitments of doctrine and order."

On July 21 & 22, 1993, WCVB-TV's Chronicle (American TV program) aired a two part investigative report on the community, part of which discussed allegations by former members and the response of the community. In 2021, WBZ-TV aired a report from their Investigative Team, which alleged the group emotionally abused them as former members. Additionally, a documentary was aired by the CBC Television program The Fifth Estate (TV program) about Grenville Christian College related to the group, with abuse allegations. (See Grenville Christian College for more information.)

Another documentary was aired in 2021, by The Fifth Estate, with allegations related to Grenville Christian College. In 2025, a federal lawsuit alleged that the community was trafficking minors for labor and forcing children to work long hours building an event space without compensation. In response, a lawyer for the Community said the lawsuit dishonored the real victims of trafficking in our society and asserted that the plaintiff's mother had signed a waiver for plaintiff to volunteer on a construction project and that the plaintiff's father had worked alongside him as a foreman on the project.

== Rule of Life ==
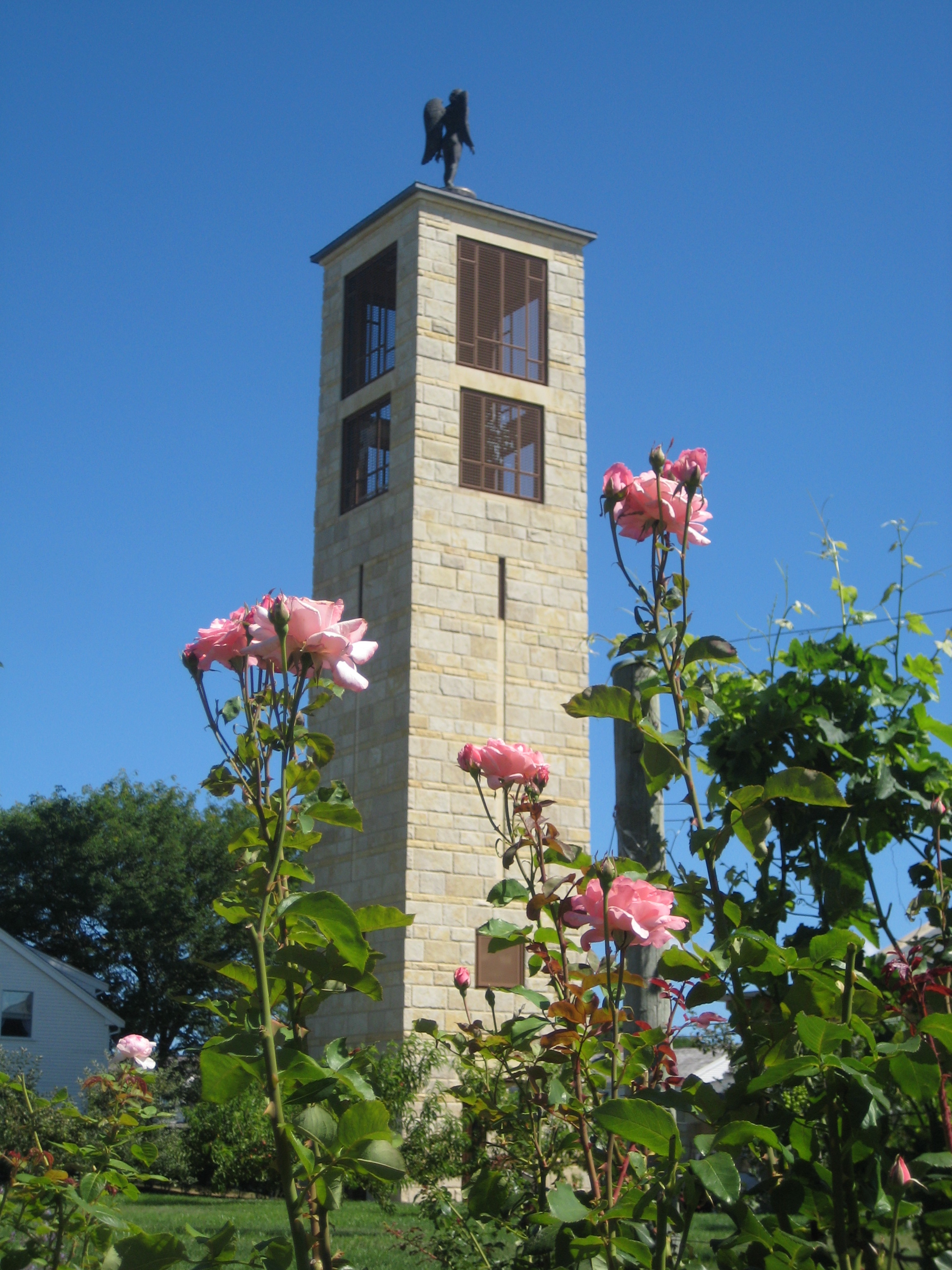
Bell tower at the Community of Jesus

According to the Community of Jesus the Rule took its present shape in 2008 after final adoption by a vote of the Chapter (which is composed of the solemnly professed members). Its content is drawn from and inspired by Scripture, church tradition, the Rule of St. Benedict, and the founding principles and charisms of the Community of Jesus expressed in its founding and in its ongoing evolution. Its purpose is to prescribe a standard of spiritual wisdom for community living, and to be a basic guide for those wishing to commit themselves to the monastic life as it is pursued in the Community of Jesus.

Following a prologue, the Rule of Life is divided into two major sections, each of which has two parts. Section I sets forth the fundamental spiritual principles upon which the Community of Jesus was founded and which continue to give the community its definition. These are presented in Parts A and B under the headings of “Vocation” (God's call) and “Profession” (our response). Section II applies those principles to the procedures for membership and decision-making in the community.

== Church of the Transfiguration ==
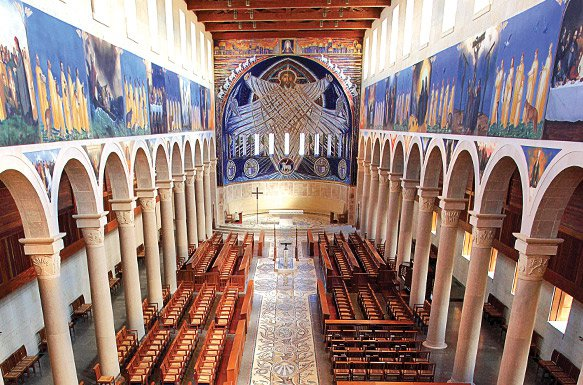
Interior view of the Church of the Transfiguration, Orleans

The Church of the Transfiguration is a contemporary expression of a 4th-century basilica.

The interior of the Church is filled with hand-crafted mosaic and frescoes painted by Silvestro Pistolesi of Florence, as well as glass and stone artwork. The bronze doors are by Romolo Del Deo.

== E. M. Skinner organ ==
Built by Nelson Barden & Associates of Boston, MA, the organ at the Church of the Transfiguration is a restoration and expansion of components from a number of twentieth-century organs of the Ernest M. Skinner Organ Company. When completed, it will include 150 ranks and 12,500 pipes, making it one of the six largest organs in the country, and in the top ten largest in the world.

== Elements Theatre Company ==
Elements Theatre Company was founded in 1992, by several members of the Community of Jesus. They perform year-round on Cape Cod, as well as touring nationally and internationally. Recent tours have included performances at the New York Public Library for the Performing Arts at Lincoln Center (New York), The New School for Drama (New York), 92nd Street Y (New York), East 13th Street Theatre, home of Classic Stage Company (New York), St. Malachy's - The Actor's Chapel (New York), Chicago Theological Seminary (New York), Chicago Public Library, Dominican University (River Forest, IL), and the Cathedral of St. Christopher in Barga, Italy.

Recent performances include Talking Heads by Alan Bennett, God of Carnage by Yasmina Reza, A Christmas Carol by Charles Dickens, Pillars of the Community by Henrik Ibsen, The Dining Room by A.R. Gurney, The Cherry Orchard by Anton Chekhov, The Doorway by Phyllis Tickle, The Trial of Jesus by John Masefield, and Rumors by Neil Simon. Recent Shakespeare performances include, Merchant of Venice, Twelfth Night, A Midsummer Night's Dream, and Julius Caesar.

== Criticism ==
Around 1973, Cay Andersen became involved in promoting the "Diet, Discipline, and Discipleship" ("3D") weight loss program, which seemed to focus on sin and guilt as a way to lose weight.

It is characterized as a cult on the CBC/Radio-Canada program The Fifth Estate. CBC describes them as “a mysterious and abusive Christian cult in Cape Cod, Mass."

They were included in the 1990 book Churches That Abuse by Ron Enroth.

In 1993 allegations of abuse were explored on the program Chronicle which aired on Channel 5 in Boston, Massachusetts. Controversy surrounding alleged abuse further emerged through a successful class-action suit against Grenville Christian College, which had close ties to the Community of Jesus. Grenville's co-founders were all members of the Community of Jesus, including pastors Betty and Charles Farnsworth, who also served as headmaster, and fellow headmaster J. Alastair Haig and his wife, Mary Florence Mollard Haig, each of whom was named in the lawsuit. The Haigs divorced and Mary remarried in 2006. She moved into the Cape Cod enclave with her second husband, John Philip French, who was a member of the board of directors for the Community of Jesus until his death in 2018.

In February 2020, a Canadian court cited the influence of the Community of Jesus in the abuse of students at Grenville Christian College. In the case opinion, Judge Janet Leiper of the Ontario Superior Court of Justice wrote: “I have concluded that the evidence of maltreatment and the varieties of abuse perpetrated on students’ bodies and minds in the name of the COJ values of submission and obedience was class-wide and decades-wide.”

Aaron Bushnell, a United States Air Force serviceman, was raised in the Community of Jesus, but left as a young adult. In the last years of his life, he described himself as “a survivor of a toxic, abusive family system” and spoke jokingly of liberating people at the Community. In 2024, he died by self-immolation in protest of the genocide of Palestinians. Before he died wrote in his will that if his friends held a funeral, he did not “wish for any members of the Community of Jesus to be present. They are in love with the system that I am trying to burn.”

== See also ==
- Grenville Christian College
