= Grenville Christian College =

Coordinates: 44°37′36″N 75°37′49″W

- Maitland, Ontario; Canada

Information
- School type: Co-ed Private Boarding/Day
- Religious affiliations: Anglican Diocese of Ontario and Community of Jesus See also Community of Jesus.
- Opened: 1973
- Closed: 2007
- Enrollment: 0
- Language: English
- Campus: rural Ontario setting

Grenville Christian College is a former private boarding school located in the rural community of Maitland, some 8 km (5 mi) northeast of Brockville, Ontario, on the bank of the St. Lawrence River. "

The independent university preparatory school was composed of upper, middle, elementary and primary schools. Students had the option of being day students, full-time boarders or weekday boarders.

== History ==
The campus was built in 1918 as St. Mary's College, a preparatory school run by the Redemptorist Order of the Roman Catholic Church. St. Mary's College operated until 1968.

The St. Mary's College campus was purchased in 1969 by a group called Berean Christian Schools, who envisioned using the facility for training missionaries. Although the exact time line is unclear, Berean Christian Schools began as a private school in 1969 and was renamed Grenville Christian College in 1973.

After 37 years, Grenville Christian College announced its closure on 30 July 2007, citing declining enrollment and unspecified financial pressures. A "Closing Celebration Weekend" was held on the weekend of 29–30 September 2007.

== Abuse allegations and lawsuits ==
The school is noted for having ties to the Community of Jesus, a controversial Benedictine sect in Cape Cod, Massachusetts. Grenville's co-founders were all members of the Community of Jesus, including pastors Betty and Charles Farnsworth, the latter of whom also served as headmaster, and fellow headmaster J. Alastair Haig and his wife, Mary Florence Mollard Haig. Described as a cult, its influence became central to a successful 2006 class-action lawsuit against the school.

In 1993, WCVB-TV (based in Boston, Massachusetts) aired a two night Chronicle special on the Community of Jesus, which mentioned that parents in the group sent their child to this school. "When he escaped and confronted his family, they told him either go back or we'll disown you."

CTV Television Network broadcast a documentary on 6 February 2016, in tandem with the launch of the book, Grenville, by Andrew J. Hale-Byrne, which highlighted the close relationship between the college and the Anglican Diocese of Ontario, and announced that the Ontario Provincial Police investigation into abuse of students has been reopened. Toronto Star followed up this reporting on 29 February 2016, wherein students reported that they had been punched in the groin and urinated on by staff, among other abuses mentioned. The Ontario Provincial Police criminal investigation into abuse by former staff is ongoing. The Crown laid their first charges on 6 October 2016, for sexual assault. Robert Farnsworth, son of the founding family, was arrested on 5 October 2016, but was later cleared of the allegations.

Previously, there had been allegations of student abuse and cult practices at the school that were ultimately dismissed by the Anglican Diocese of Ontario. The church went on record rejecting calls to investigate of misconduct complaints against school officials due to the OPP Investigation, but the church considered the possibility of sanctioning an ordained minister who was headmaster of the College for two decades. In September 2007, the Ontario Provincial Police began investigating two former headmasters who were also Anglican priests. The chair of the school's Board of Directors and the Bishop of the Diocese of Ontario denied that the school was ever formally affiliated with the Anglican Church of Canada. Anglican priests and bishops, had often officiated at the school's chapel services, as did representatives of other denominations. The school chose to fly the Anglican flag.

Since the school's closing, some former students have claimed punishments by silence and separation ("Discipline"), a form of internal suspension, as well as being woken in the middle of the night by having bright light shone in their faces and being interrogated about their alleged "sins". The former co-publisher of a local newspaper, The Recorder & Times, has stated that his newspaper became aware of allegations of religious cult practices at Grenville Christian College in the late 1980s, but was unable to convince anyone to publicize the story. The paper was also threatened with libel action by a Bay Street law firm.

In 2007, the acting chairman of the school's Board of Directors formally apologized to students who felt they had been abused at any time in the school's history. That same year, former students filed a class action lawsuit against Grenville, its principals, Farnsworth and Haig, and the Diocese of Ontario, claiming abuse of students. A second amended lawsuit was filed in January 2008.

In November 2008, following an investigation, the Ontario Provincial Police announced that there would be no charges laid involving the historical abuse allegations.

In 2012, Justice Perell dismissed all the claims against the Diocese, holding that "Grenville Christian College was the enterprise of Fathers Haig and Farnsworth, and the Diocese ... had no power or control or legal right to intervene in the operation of the school". The action as against Grenville, Farnsworth and Haig was allowed to proceed.

In February 2020, after a trial that spanned two months, former students won their class action lawsuit against the college, which was ordered to pay punitive damages.

In 2021, The CBC Television program The Fifth Estate aired a documentary on the school and the abuse allegations, as well as airing another documentary the following year with new allegations.

== Post-Closure ==
Since 2007's closure, The Grenville Christian College's campus remains largely abandoned, and the property has been sold to different owners multiple times. In 2013 the property was attempted to be rezoned to turn the campus into artist lofts & boutique stores. In 2019 This project was abandoned, and the campus was then sold to a Vancouver-based Chinese international school chain. There have been other attempts to sell off the property since then, and as of 2026 most of the buildings remain abandoned.
