= Kenneth Dean =

Kenneth or Ken Dean may refer to:

- Ken Dean (rugby league) (1926/7–2017), rugby league footballer
- Ken Dean (Australian footballer) (born 1938), Australian rules footballer
- Kenneth Dean (academic), Chinese cultural studies professor

== See also ==
- Kenneth Deane (disambiguation)
- Dean (surname)
