= Royal St. George's College =

Location
- 120 Howland Avenue; Toronto, Ontario; Canada; 43.6689°N 79.4106°W

Information
- School type: Independent day school
- Motto: Scientia Pietate (Latin for 'Through Knowledge and Duty')
- Religious affiliation: Anglican Church of Canada
- Established: 1961; 65 years ago
- Headmaster: Stephen Beatty
- Warden: Dr. Giles Bryant
- Chaplain: The Rev. Dr. James Leatch, Capt. (Ret'd)
- Faculty: 115
- Grades: 3 to 12
- Enrollment: Approximately 520
- Language: English
- Campus type: Urban
- Houses: Canterbury, Westminster, Winchester, York
- Colours: Blue, red, gold and white
- Song: Great Saint George all hail this day!
- Athletics conference: CISAA
- Nickname: Knights
- Publication: The Shield; The Howlander
- Yearbook: The Georgian
- Credo: Manners Maketh Men
- Demonym: Georgian
- Website: www.rsgc.on.ca

Royal St. George's College (RSGC) is an Anglican-affiliated independent school for boys located in The Annex neighbourhood of Toronto, Ontario, Canada. The school admits boys from Grades 3 through 12. Founded in 1961 as an Anglican choir school in the tradition of the great collegiate and cathedral choir schools in the United Kingdom, the school admitted its first students in 1964. It is the only pre-university school in Canada authorized to use the "Royal" designation (after the "Royal Grammar School of Montreal", founded in 1801 and united since 1846 to the High School of Montreal, closed in 1979), and it houses the historic Chapel of St. Alban-the-Martyr, the former cathedral of the Anglican Diocese of Toronto, and the See House, the former Queen Anne Revival style residence of the Bishop. RSGC is also the official choir school for the Cathedral Church of St. James.

In July 2011, Stephen Beatty (Class of 1986) became the school's seventh headmaster.

== History ==
=== St. George's College, the beginnings ===
St. George's began as the vision of a group of Anglican clergy and laity in the 1950s interested in establishing a permanent home for boys' choral music in Canada. Led by Dr. Healey Willan CC, who served as first Warden of the college, the founders looked to the model of the diocesan summer choir camp run by the late John L. Bradley (third Warden) and John Cook for inspiration. In 1961, the Ontario Legislature passed a private member's bill, sponsored by the Hon. Alfred H. Cowling MPP, incorporating the school as St. George's College. At the time, the founders were in negotiations with the Church of St. George's on-the-Hill to utilize their facilities for the school. While the location changed, the name stuck and at the invitation of Bishop Frederick H. Wilkinson of Toronto the parish of St. Alban the Martyr and the resident St. Andrew's Japanese Congregation began joint use of the Howland Avenue property with the school.

=== Founding Headmaster ===
Dr. John "Jack" Lennox Wright, the founding headmaster, welcomed the first classes of students in 1964. The Primate of the Anglican Church of Canada, Archbishop Howard Clark, formally dedicated the school. Other founders immediately joined the teaching faculty, including the Rev. Kenneth Scott, John "Bear" Allen, and others. Allen succeeded as second headmaster in 1978. He expanded the school's outlook inclusivity and facilities while remaining faithful to the founding vision.

=== 'Royal' designation ===
In 1988, John R. Latimer assumed leadership of the school, and he led the celebrations marking the Silver Jubilee of the college in 1989. These events culminated in a visit to the school by the Duchess of Kent, who proclaimed the 'Royal' designation on behalf of Queen Elizabeth II. Subsequently following this designation, the school’s name was officially changed from St. George’s College to Royal St. George’s College.

=== Recent years ===
Following Latimer's departure in 1996, Hal Hannaford became the new headmaster. Hannaford left RSGC in 2008 to become the headmaster at Selwyn House School in Montreal.

Hannaford's move to Montreal made way for Steve Griffin to succeed to the headmastership of the college. In February 2010, Griffin abruptly resigned and Paul O'Leary was appointed interim headmaster. Stephen Beatty assumed the headmastership in July 2011.

The college's motto, Scientia Pietate, suggested by founder Professor J. B. E. Garstang (son and partner of archaeologist John Garstang) translates approximately as Through Knowledge and Duty. Other important phrases in the school include Respect, Responsibility, and Voice, and the famous words of William of Wykeham, Manners Maketh Men, appropriated by Dr. Wright as a personal credo.

== School life ==
Students are divided between Junior (Grades 3-8) and Senior Schools (Grades 9-12) during their careers and complete the Provincial requirements for Secondary School graduation, as well as being able to enrol in Advanced Placement programmes.

A typical day for a student involves regular academic classes, arts courses (such as instrumental and choral music, visual art, and drama), outdoor play and organized games and some other extra-curricular activity.

A variety of clubs exist including the Debate Team, Model UN Delegation, Environment Club, the Vinyl Club, the Duke of Edinburgh's Award, Jazz Band, the Servers' Guild, various intramural sports leagues, Tech Crew and various yearly dramatic productions.

Every Thursday, the entire school meets together in the Chapel for Choral Evensong, sung by the choir and led by the Chaplain, a licensed minister of the Anglican Church of Canada. There are several community Eucharists celebrated as well, according to the liturgical calendar. For spiritual and social resources, in addition to the Chaplain, the College engages a social worker to help address the needs of all community members. Because St. George's is of an Anglican foundation, it requires the participation of students of all backgrounds in its Anglican religious services.

Student leadership is expressed most potently in the Academic Council, the Stewards, and the Prefects, under the Head Prefect.

Students compete with each other on four teams, or houses, named for the four great cathedrals of England which collectively supply the school colours. These Houses are Canterbury (red), Westminster (white), Winchester (gold), and York (blue).

Every December, RSGC’s oldest tradition, the Service of Nine Lessons and Carols takes place at the Cathedral Church of St. James, featuring the College Choir, with attendance upwards of 1000 members of the school and local community.

== Athletics ==
Athletics at the College have always played a vital part in student life. In addition to intramural teams, varsity, junior varsity, and Junior School teams include Hockey, Tennis, Soccer, Squash, Baseball, Softball, Alpine Skiing, Volleyball, Track and Field, Cross-Country, Golf, Basketball, Ultimate Frisbee, as well as Racquets. Judo is also a popular extra curricular activity. Athletic facilities include a fitness centre to allow boys to take increased responsibility for their own physical health, one gymnasium, a dojo for martial arts, and an artificial outdoor turf. Students swim at the nearby St. Alban's Boys' and Girls' Club.

== Cathedral of St. Alban the Martyr ==
=== Overview ===
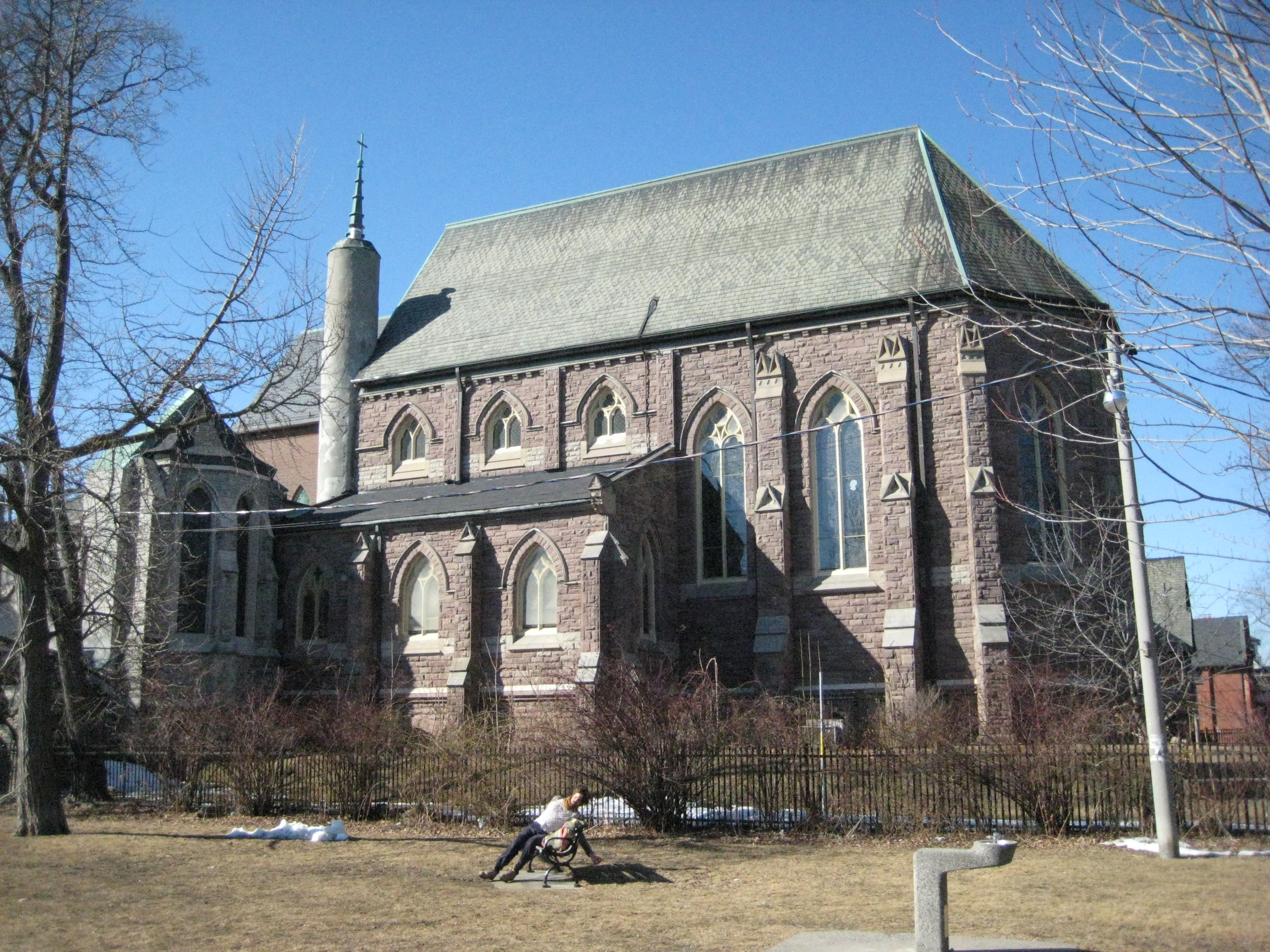
The Chapel of St. Alban-the-Martyr from the South, the unfinished cathedral

Archbishop Arthur Sweatman of Toronto envisioned the Cathedral of St. Alban-the-Martyr replacing the de facto use of St. James' Church, whose parishioners were unwilling to compromise with their bishop over the use of their church as diocesan seat. St. Alban's was designated the cathedral of the Anglican Diocese of Toronto in 1883 by an act of the Ontario Legislature, while still in the planning stages. The chancel & crypt of the projected building were completed, according to the plans of Richard Cunningham Windeyer, in 1891, but subsequent construction stalled and was only partially continued by Ralph Adams Cram and Vaux Chadwick in the first decades of the twentieth century. The patronage of Sir Henry Mill Pellatt of Casa Loma and Edward Marion Chadwick was essential to the project. The chancel became the school chapel when the College leased the St. Alban's property, at the suggestion of Bishop Frederick Wilkinson.

The completed chancel features the only double hammerbeam roof in Canada as heraldic stained glass.

A second phase of building was begun in 1912 with the laying of a foundation stone by Prince Arthur, Duke of Connaught and Strathearn and his daughter, Princess Patricia. The ground they broke would eventually become the foundation for the Senior School, known as Founders' Hall.

Cathedral status was dropped in 1936, which ended all hope for the completion of the nave and tower.

=== Fires ===
The building has had two fires:

- 1929 fire damaged the interior
- 2010 fire damaged the roof, destroyed woodwork and flooring

== See House ==
In addition to the chapel, a See House, or bishop's residence was built in 1885 by architects Frank Darling and S. George Curry, which now serves as the college's administrative hub. Also, a school building was erected about 1897 by the Wells-DePencier family of Davenport to house the short-lived St. Alban's Cathedral School. This building now houses classrooms and the school's assembly hall, named for founder and second Warden P. A. C. Ketchum. St. Alban's School was directed by Marmaduke Matthews, the founder of the Wychwood Park estate in Toronto, as well as the Ontario College of Art & Design.

== Notable alumni ==
=== RSGC Alumni Association (RSGCAA) ===
Graduates of the school, Old Georgians, can continue a lifelong involvement with RSGC through the Alumni Association which meets monthly to plan support events for the school and to foster goodwill among graduates. Some Old Georgians have joined the Board of Governors of the school, while others teach, offer professional mentorships, or make financial contributions. Old Georgians are welcomed back to the school at several annual events, including the Alumni Dinner, the Carol Service, and the Ball-Hockey Tournament.

Notable Old Georgians include:

- Damian Abraham ('99) lead singer, Fucked Up, Host of The Wedge
- Dr. Jonathan Baillie ('90) zoologist
- Sean Black ('93) Olympic boxer & model
- James Carl ('79) sculptor
- Dr. Patrick Baillie ('80) Psychologist and Lawyer; former President of the Canadian Psychological Association
- Thomas D'Arcy ('98) alternative musician
- Jonah Falco ('01) drummer of the band Fucked Up
- David Hewlett ('87) actor
- Michael Kovrig (‘89) former Canadian diplomat
- Michael Lambert ('04) Olympic snowboarder
- Eli Langer ('86) visual artist
- John Millen ('79) Olympic Bronze Medallist for sailing
- Vincenzo Natali ('87) director & screenwriter
- Andrew Nikiforuk ('74) journalist
- Bruce Patterson ('86) Deputy Chief Herald of Canada
- Andrew Podnieks ('80) hockey historian
- Phillip Poole ('70) suffragan bishop of the Anglican Diocese of Toronto and President Emeritus of the Compass Rose Society
- Reza Satchu ('87) entrepreneur and professor
- Noah '40' Shebib, record producer
- Mark Wilkins ('02) race car driver

== Notable former faculty ==
- The Reverend Dorian Baxter, founder of Christ the King Graceland Independent Anglican Church of Canada
- David Hewlett, British-born Canadian actor, writer and director best known for playing Dr. Rodney McKay in Stargate SG-1, Stargate Atlantis and Stargate Universe
- Dr. John Tuttle, organist
- John Latimer, a founder of Greenwood College School.

== See also ==
- Education in Ontario
- List of secondary schools in Ontario
