= James Carl =

Canadian artist

- Born: 1960 (age 65–66); Montreal
- Known for: Sculptor

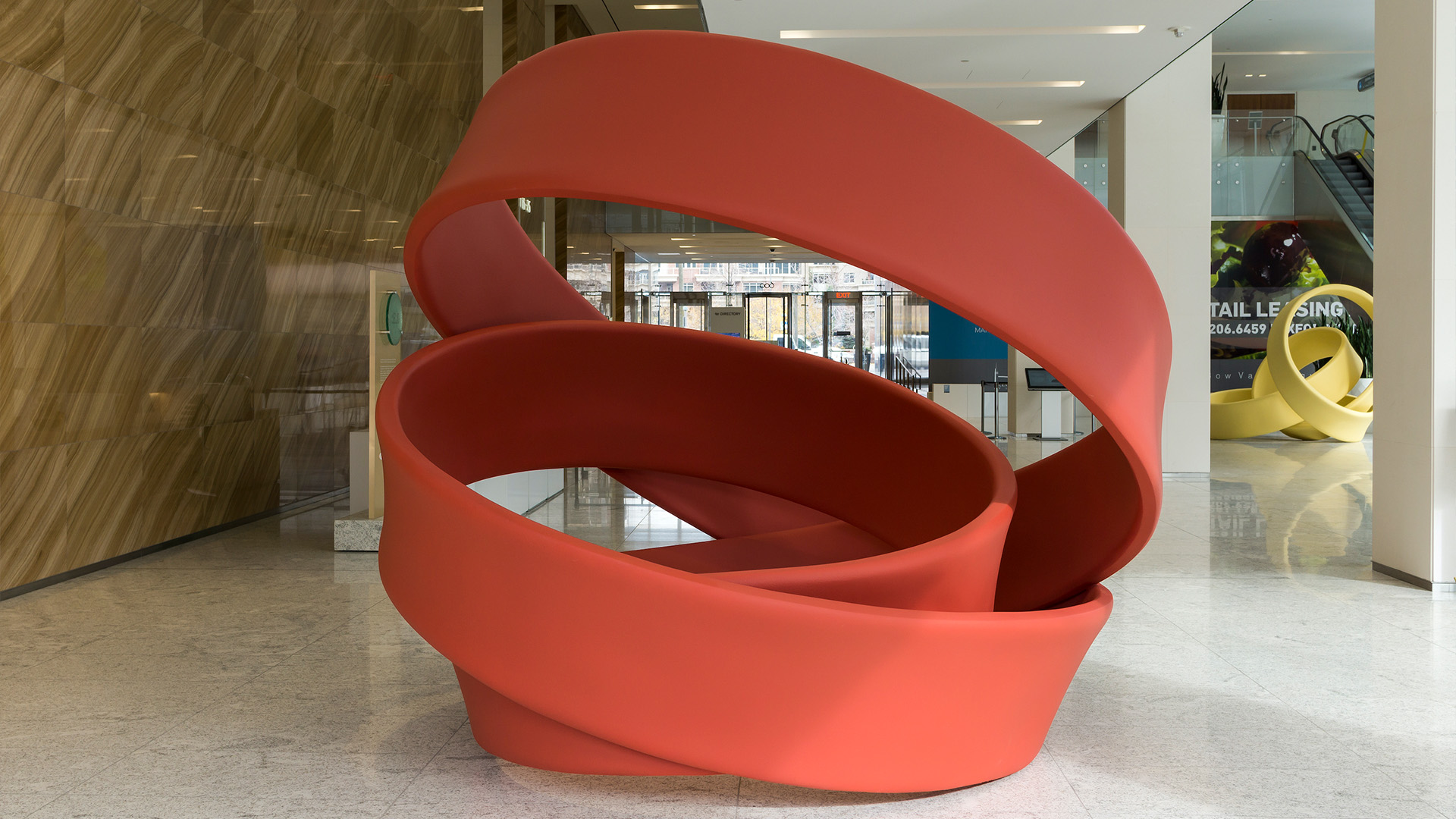
things end (Eau Claire) by James Carl, 2020. Installed in Calgary, Alberta.

James Carl (born 1960, in Montreal) is a Canadian artist with a thirty-year exhibition history in Canada and internationally.

== Life ==
Carl completed a BFA at the University of Victoria in the early 1980s. At Victoria, he worked primarily with Roland Brener, but was also influenced by Mowry Baden, Susan G. Scott, and Fred Douglas. Carl earned a BA in 1992 from the East Asian Studies program at McGill University, where he studied with Kenneth Dean and Roberto Ong. On two occasions (1989–1990, 1994–1995) Carl studied at the Central Academy of Art in Beijing (中央美术学院). In 1996, he earned his MFA from Rutgers University, studying with Laura Ewing, Martha Rosler, and Geoffrey Hendricks.

== Work ==
Carl works in sculpture and drawing, using a variety of materials ranging from cardboard to marble, commercial signage to conventional print media. Early sculptural works promoted direct viewer participation and public encounter. More recent works connect to the viewer through their vocabulary of common forms and materials. In Carl's work "both material and manufacture are enlisted into the economy of meaning" (Barbara Fischer). Elastic bands are a favoured motif, having been the subject of multiple artworks dating back to at least 2009. Chinese culture has been an aspect of Carl's research since traveling to China in the mid 1980s. He has lectured at the Central Academy of Art in Beijing (中央美术学院) regularly over the intervening years, most recently leading a master's class in 2019. In association with the Sui Jian Guo Foundation, Carl is the co-editor and co-translator of a series of Chinese translations of modern and contemporary Western art historical texts. Among the translations are William Tucker's Language of Sculpture, Rosalind Krauss' Passages in Modern Sculpture, Dan Graham's collected writings, Rock My Religion, and most recently, Formless: A User's Guide, by Rosalind Krauss and Yves Alain Bois. The latter was published in China in 2021.

Carl's work is included in the permanent collection of the National Gallery of Canada, the Art Gallery of Ontario and private collections in Canada, the US, China and Europe. Carl has completed several large-scale public projects, notably in Toronto, Calgary, and in Wuhan, China. A number of these projects are from his Thing's End series, depicting large rubber bands fabricated in steel or aluminum.

From 1999-2022, he was a professor of studio art at the University of Guelph. Among his many successful students are: Kelly Jazvac, Derek Sullivan, Zin Taylor, Kristan Horton, James Gardner, Roula Partheniou, Devon Knowles, Peter Gazendam, Tiziana La Melia, Jen Aitken, and Patrick Cruz.
