= St. Bartholomew's Anglican Church (Toronto) =

Coordinates: 43.659711°N 79.363931°W

St Bartholomew's, Regent Park
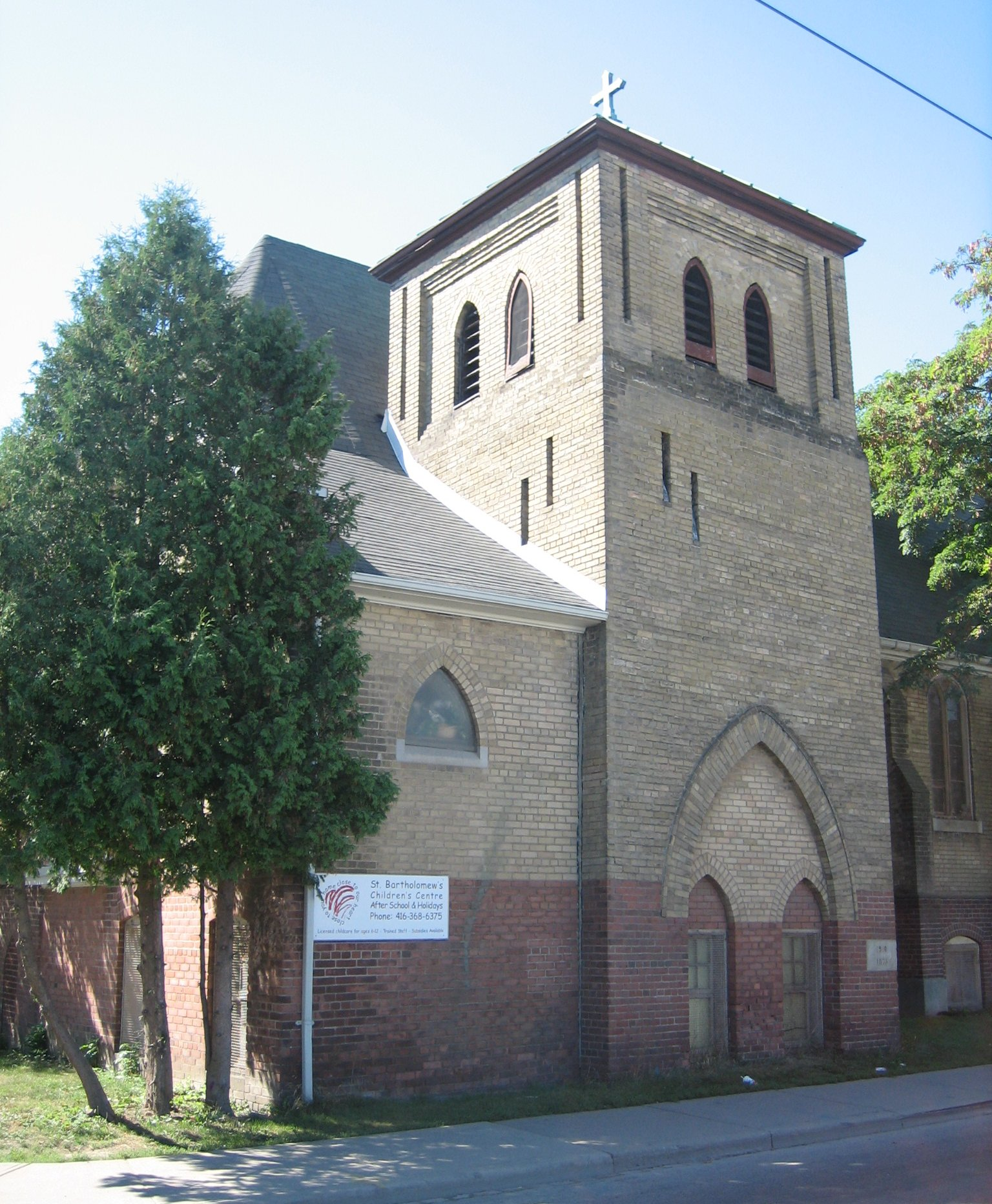
- The church building in 2007
- St Bartholomew's, Regent Park
- Denomination: Anglican Church of Canada
- Churchmanship: Anglo-Catholic
- Website: stbartstoronto.ca

History
- Dedication: Bartholomew the Apostle

Administration
- Province: Ontario
- Diocese: Toronto
- Deanery: St. James

Clergy
- Vicar: Walter Hannam

St Bartholomew's Anglican Church (also known as St Bartholomew's, Regent Park) is a parish of the Diocese of Toronto in the Anglican Church of Canada. It is a ministry in collaboration with the Cathedral Church of St. James. Located in the Regent Park area of Toronto, the congregation operates several outreach programs. It is an Anglo-Catholic parish.

== History ==
St Bartholomew's Episcopal Mission Church was founded in 1873 as a mission of All Saints, Sherbourne Street. The architect was Walter Reginald Strickland. St Bartholomew's Church stood until 1910 at the end of Beech Street (now Dundas Street East) on the east side of River Street. The parish of St Matthew's, Riverdale, in its turn, began life as a mission of St Bartholomew's in 1874. A second mission church, St Augustine's, was established on the corner of Spruce and Parliament streets in Cabbagetown in 1888. It became an independent parish in 1905 and was destroyed by fire in 1931.

The parish church was relocated to its current site at the intersection of Dundas and Regent streets in 1910 to make room for the construction of the Dundas Street bridge. The structure was pulled west by a team of horses to Parliament Street. While numbers and finances declined just before and during the First World War, two lay guilds, the St Bartholomew's Association (a parish society for the advancement of the spiritual life) and a chapter of the Brotherhood of St. Andrew, appear to have flourished.

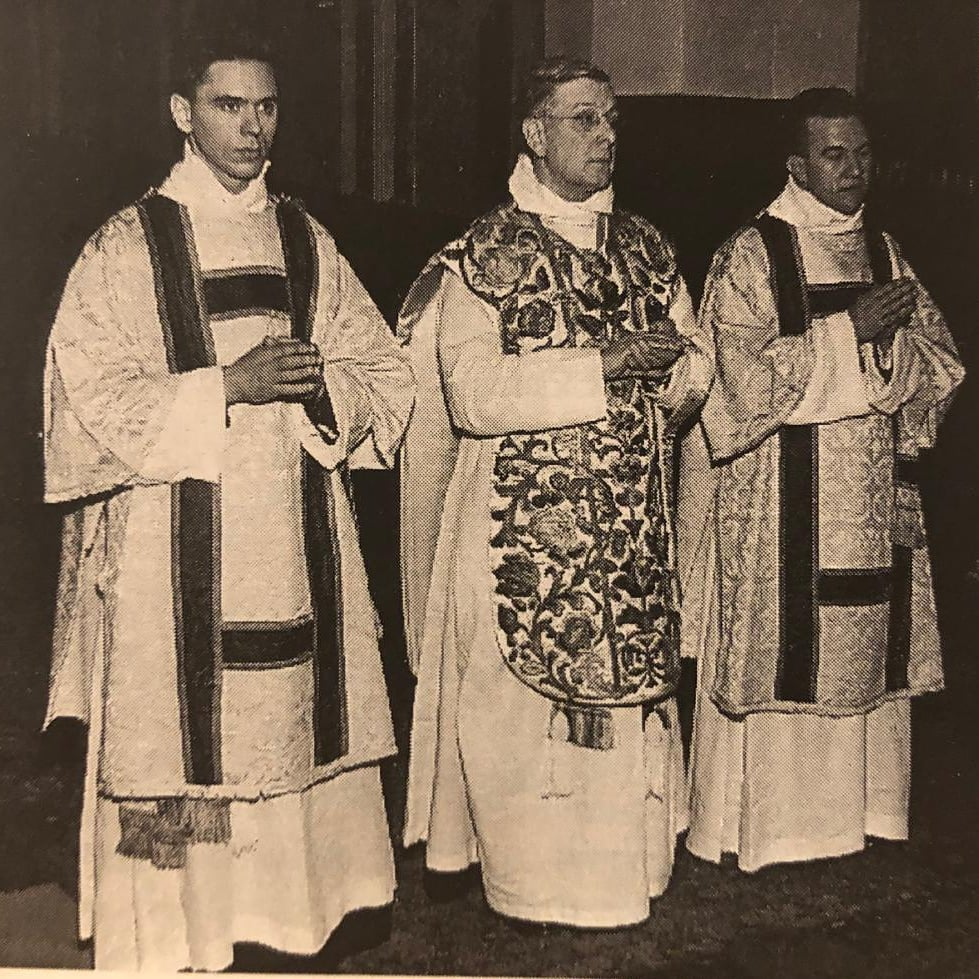
Fr Pashler (Rector, 1925-1959) with Fr Jack Adam (left) and Fr Gilbody (right)

Unlike certain other Toronto parishes of the same era, such as St. Mary Magdalene's, St Thomas's, Huron Street, and St. Matthias, Bellwoods, St Bart's was not an Anglo-Catholic foundation. The first Anglo-Catholic rector of St Bartholomew's was Charles Fredrick Pashler. A veteran of the First World War, who had been severely wounded at Monchy in August 1918, Pashler was influenced not only by the Tractarian and Ritualist movements of the Church of England, but also by the simple Roman Catholic piety he had witnessed in rural France: "the kindliness and unaffected piety of the people, the natural practice of their religion, the soutane-clad figures of their pastors in the village streets and country lanes" were all to have their influence on his ministry. Pashler was "unique among Toronto priests" of his generation "inasmuch as he always and everywhere wore his cassock, in and out of season" (a common practice on the Continent and in Anglo-Catholic parishes in England at the time).

In the face of some opposition, especially from members of the nearby Jarvis Street Baptist Church, Pashler was able to introduce weekly, and soon daily, celebrations, early on in his incumbency. The use of Eucharistic vestments, altar candles, and incense were all soon to follow. Pashler's Anglo-Catholic principles were both simple and clear:

We do not think of ourselves as a foreign, alien group on the edge of Anglicanism, but as believing, teaching, and doing those things which the Church herself intends. We do not believe that Roman Catholics are the only Catholics, but that Anglicans are Catholics too. From that, all those things which puzzle some people – the beauty of our worship, our teaching about the seven sacraments, our love and reverence for our Lord's Mother and the Saints – all these stem from our conviction that when in the creeds we assert our belief in the Catholic Church, our prayer book means exactly what it says.

Pashler died suddenly in 1959. The City of Toronto renamed the street on which the Clergy House stood as 'Pashler Avenue’. Celebrants from other Anglo-Catholic parishes and Trinity College, Toronto, ensured that the daily Mass continued until his successor was appointed.

In the fall of 1959, Donald F. Bellway, who had been an assistant priest at St James, Vancouver, arrived as the new rector. The years of his incumbency were dominated by the emerging social problems of the newly built Regent Park public housing project. A series of consultations took place to investigate the possibility of whether the Anglican Diocese, the parish, other Christian denominations, and secular groups might co-operate in finding solutions. Bellway was the prime mover in these discussions, which paved the way for much church and community co-operation for the next quarter of a century.

Bellway was succeeded, in 1977, by Robert Greene. A former tank gunner of the Italian Campaign, whose great heroes were the Ritualist slum priests of the late-nineteenth and early-twentieth centuries, Greene carried on the work of inner-city co-operation between church and community that Father Bellway had begun. As social problems became more acute through the 1970s and 1980s, several new initiatives were undertaken. A food bank was run out of the basement of the rectory (as it was now being called); two breakfast soup kitchens were set up with the collaboration of a local police sergeant and a staff of volunteers from the parish and St James Cathedral. An indefatigable visitor, Greene continuously visited his way through the parish list and around Regent Park; he also undertook a visitation ministry to the Don Jail.

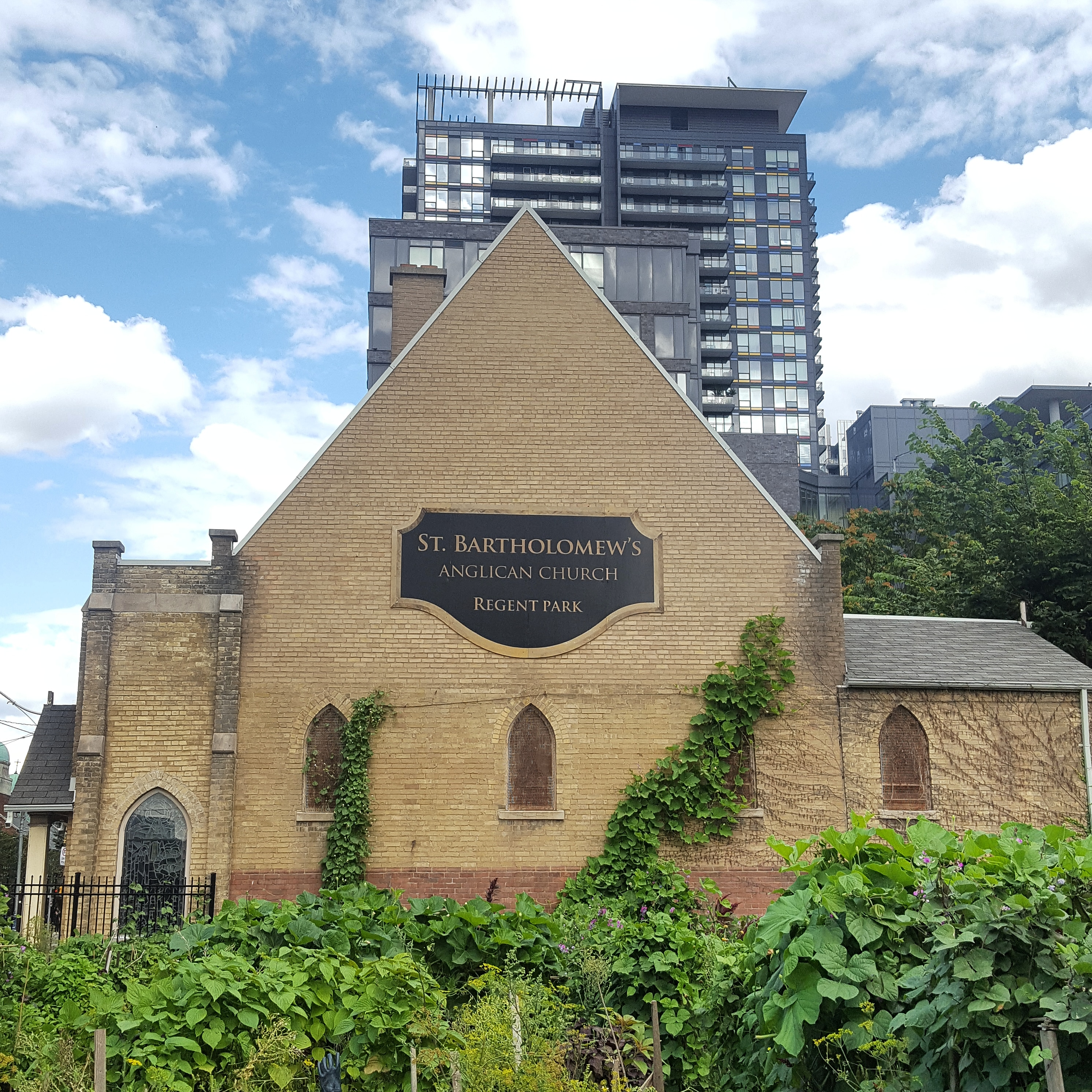
St Bartholomew's Anglican Church, Regent Park

In June 1986, Greene's work was recognized by Mother Teresa of Calcutta, who visited the rectory and toured Regent Park with the rector.

Today, St Bartholomew's stands in the midst of a major urban revitalization project. In 2012, the then-Dean of St James Cathedral, Douglas Stoute, suggested to the Archbishop of Toronto, Colin Johnson, that the cathedral and diocese should support St Bartholomew's, to help ensure that the parish might re-engage with its community in a time of transition. The parish remains a ministry in collaboration with St James Cathedral.

== Liturgy ==
St Bartholomew's is an Anglo-Catholic parish and follows the Rite of the 1959 Canadian revision of the Book of Common Prayer with additions from Anglo-Catholic service books such as the Plainchant Gradual, the English Gradual, the Anglican Missal, and the Monastic Diurnal Noted. The ceremonial is that of the Western Rite. A Solemn or Sung Mass preceded by the Asperges and followed by the Angelus is celebrated every Sunday of the year. A Solemn Mass with Procession is sung on many major Feast Days.

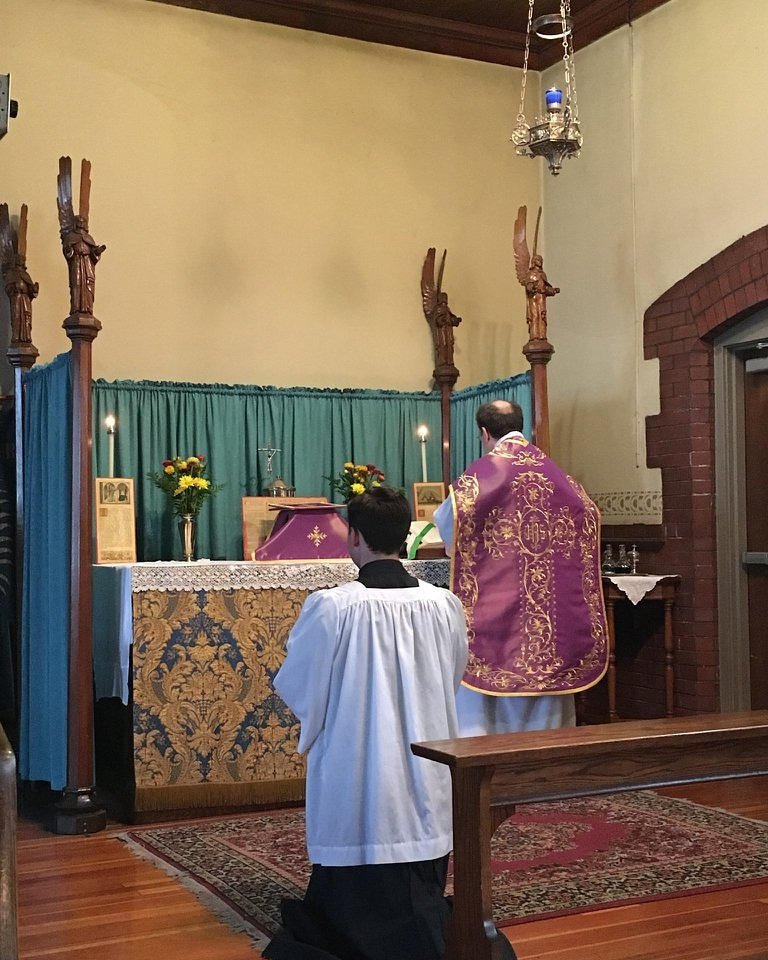
Low Mass at the Lady Altar

Low Mass is celebrated daily from Tuesday to Saturday. From Tuesday through Friday, morning and evening prayer are recited in the Lady Chapel according to the 1959 Canadian Book of Common Prayer. Solemn Evensong, followed by Benediction or the Rosary, is sung weekly on Saturday evenings.

== Music ==
Healey Willan was a frequent visitor to the Clergy House at St Bartholomew's during the tenure of his student, Alex Shaw (1929–1963), as Choir Master. After the death of Pashler, Shaw became Organist and Choir Master of All Hallows', Main Street.

Shaw's successor, Walter Barnes (1963–1984), had been a protégé of Willan's student, Walter McNutt, Choir Master at St Thomas's, Huron Street. During Barnes's tenure, the well-known St Bart's Boys' Choir toured widely, including performances at Expo 67, and recorded two long play records on the Arc label.

The parish's current Cantrix and Choir Director, Katherine Hill, is a mediaevalist, singer, and multi-instrumentalist, who performs with the Toronto Consort. The parish organist, Sebastian Moreno, is a student of Stephanie Martin and John Tuttle, former organists of the Church of St. Mary Magdalene and St Thomas's, Huron Street, respectively.

== Catholic devotion at St Bartholomew's ==
St Bartholomew's has many regular corporate devotions. A Holy Hour (eucharistic adoration) is held weekly on Friday evenings (Thursdays in Lent). The Stations of the Cross are held weekly in Lent and more frequently during Holy Week. The Holy Rosary is recited twice weekly throughout the year.

St Bartholomew's currently has a parish branch of the Guild of All Souls (American Branch) under the patronage of Our Lady of Solitude and St Dismas. Historically, the parish once had a cell of the Society of the Holy House at Walsingham, as well as a parish ward of the Confraternity of the Blessed Sacrament. Some current parishioners regularly attend meetings of the Toronto Ward of the Society of Mary. St Bartholomew's holds an annual May Procession, Solemn Mass of Our Lady, and May Crowning as part of the Society of Mary's May Festival.

Confessions are currently heard weekly, after Saturday evensong, and by appointment.

== Parish outreach programs ==
The parish has four major outreach programs, all of which are fundamentally food ministries:

- A breakfast ministry on Thursday mornings providing approximately 200 hot meals each week.
- A Saturday afternoon drop-in ministry, serving between 70 and 100 home-cooked meals each week.
- A food bank that operates Monday and Thursday mornings.
- A Christmas outreach that provides food and toy vouchers to local families.

== Children's Centre ==
The St Bartholomew's Children's Centre operates from the parish hall. The centre has programs "designed for a multicultural community, enabling children to experience" Regent Park's "rich cultures" and to "develop the social skills that will make them successful in life and help them to excel in school."

== Parish priests of St Bartholomew's ==
- Arthur Baldwin – Acting Rector, 1873–1874
- John McLean – Rector, 1874–1878
- George Irwin Taylor – Rector, 1878–1914
- Oswald Rigby – Vicar, 1914–1919
- George B. Morley – Rector, 1919–1923
- Charles Fredrick Pashler – Rector, 1925–1959
- Donald Franklin Bellway – Rector, 1959–1976
- David Mullholland – Priest-in-Charge, 1976–1977
- Robert Stuart Harvey Greene, SSC – Rector, 1977–1993
- Kent Doe – Incumbent, 1994–1999
- Gordon Walls – Incumbent, 1999–2008
- Robert Conway – Priest-in-Charge, 2008–2012
- Richard Gauthier – Priest-in-Charge, 2012
- Douglas Stoute – Priest-in-Charge, 2012–2015
- David Brinton, OGS – Vicar, 2012–2013
- Walter Hannam – Vicar, 2013–present
- Andrew Asbil – Priest-in-Charge, 2016–2018
- Stephen Vail – Priest-in-Charge, 2019–present

== See also ==
- List of Anglican churches in Toronto
- List of Anglo-Catholic churches
