= The Synthetic Collective =

The Synthetic Collective is an interdisciplinary collective of visual artists, cultural workers and scientists. The collective researches about the impacts and complexities of plastics and micro-plastics in The Great Lakes region. Through their interdisciplinary collaboration, The Synthetic Collective produces arts and cultural exhibitions and projects, and scientific research and articles, all focused on plastic pollution, microplastics, and industrial plastic pellets. Their research processes rest at the intersection of geology and the arts. The collective's overall goal is "to better connect scientific knowledge with potential cultural imports, and enrich artistic production with informed science.... Our intent is to follow plastics through from production and consumption to disposal and disaggregation." The Synthetic Collective's work can be considered a form of environmental activism.

== History and members ==
Sara Belontz joined The Synthetic Collective in 2017 when she worked with Patricia Corcoran at Western University, presumably during her studies at the university. Ian Arturo joined The Synthetic Collective when he worked in Patricia Corcoran's lab during his studies at Western University. Members of The Synthetic Collective contribute to the collective through scientific or other journal articles, or through arts and cultural programming and projects, often collaborating with each other in the process.

=== Members ===
Members of The Synthetic Collective include:

- Ian Arturo is an earth scientist working for WSP USA in New York, USA as of 2023.
- Patricia Corcoran is a professor in the Department of Earth Sciences at University of Western Ontario. Her research focuses on micro-plastics pollutions, sedimentary petrology, and precambrian geology. She has published scientific articles about plastics pollution and the plastiglomerate with members of The Synthetic Collective.
- Sara Belontz is a postdoctoral researcher at California State University San Marcos. She has published articles on plastics pollution and micro-plastics in the Great Lakes with members of The Synthetic Collective.
- Heather Davis is an artist, writer, and assistant professor of Culture and Media at The New School in New York, USA. She writes and researches about plastics, petro-capitalism, feminist and queer theory. She has written a book called Plastic Matter (2022).
- Kathleen Hill is researcher and associate professor of biology at Western University. Her research primarily consists of DNA mutations.
- Kelly Jazvac is an artist and scholar based in Montreal, Canada. Her research and artistic practice both focus on plastic waste and reusing plastic materials.
- Lorena Rios Mendoza is associate professor of chemistry in the Department of Natural Sciences at the University of Wisconsin Superior. Her research considers the "environmental chemistry pollution" within the context of microplastics and plastic pollution.
- Tegan Moore is an artist based in Montreal. Her artistic practice takes the form of installation and sculpture, where she explores material reuse and material waste.
- Kirsty Robertson is professor in the Department of Visual Arts at University of Western Ontario. As of 2023, she holds the position of Director of Museum and Curatorial Studies, and the Director of the Centre for Sustainable Curating. Her research focuses on contemporary art, curatorial studies, museums and protest, petro-capitalism, and micro-plastics and plastic pollution in the Great Lakes across North America.
- Kelly Wood is an artist, scholar, and photographer, and professor in the Department of Visual Arts at Western University. Her research and practice considers material waste, "waste economies," different forms of pollution, as well as histories of photography.

=== Plastic Pollution as a Wicked Problem and Interdisciplinary Collaboration ===
Synthetic Collective member Sara Belontz states that a wicked problem "[....] is a complex issue that cannot be mitigated by one single discipline or stakeholder." The Synthetic Collective's interdisciplinary team consists of geologists, scientists, humanities scholars, visual culture scholars, artists, and curators. Typically, their work entails that the scientists in the team offer data, which is disseminated through research, journal articles, news articles, presentations, and lectures. The group members working in the arts disseminate this research to a broader public, through artworks or artistic and other cultural programming. Their interdisciplinary collaboration includes citizen science, where members highlight the importance of non-scientists working together with scientists to gather data on plastic pollutions by collecting plastic debris or waste.

== Projects ==
=== Plastic Heart: Surface all the way through (2021) ===
Plastic Heart: Surface all the way through is a 2021 exhibition curated by The Synthetic Collective and held at the Art Museum at the University of Toronto. The exhibition presents and understand plastic pollution from an interdisciplinary perspective, considering plastic as an "art material, cultural object, geological process, petrochemical product, synthetic substance." The exhibition includes data visualizations of The Synthetic Collective's scientific research on microplastics and industrial plastic pellets across the Laurentian Great Lakes.

The Synthetic Collective curated this exhibition by considering alternative approaches to exhibition curation, installation, and design. As Kelly Wood noted, the collective looked at "every part of the exhibition to create an ecological alternative" and the exhibition curated in a way that would have "[...] as much impact as we could get out of the lowest possible use of resources [...]" This exhibition was curated through the collective's approach of "enough" as outlined in the Plastic Heart: A Fieldguide for Reducing the Environmental Impact of Art Exhibitions. As part of this approach of "enough," the collective did not paint or patch holes in the gallery's walls, and re-used a work by Christopher Mendoza from the gallery's previous exhibition "yet you dream in the green of your time" (2020).

=== Plastic Heart: A Fieldguide for Reducing the Environmental Impact of Art Exhibitions ===
Plastic Heart: A Fieldguide for Reducing the Environmental Impact of Art Exhibitions is a free guide published online on The Synthetic Collective's website. It was produced in conjunction with Plastic Heart: Surface all the way through (2021), documenting the lessons, ideas, strategies, and goals around curating the exhibition. The collective believed that it would be impossible to curate a zero waste exhibition, and instead used the exhibition as a way to ask "how small a footprint an exhibition might have while still maintaining a cultural impact worthy of its waste impact and its legibility as an exhibition." The collective moved to curate an exhibition based on their approach of "enough", where the collective considers ecological footprints, refusing to contribute to high carbon, high energy, and high waste productions. The collective considers enough as an "aesthetic based in achieving maximum impact with the minimum of resources. Enough is a counterpoint to the implied goal of museum-standard perfection and a culture that valorizes work above all else."

The collective moved to curate a show that directly interrogates the fact that many museums and galleries hold exhibitions that critique or respond to climate change, environmental degradation, and sustainability, but the exhibitions often "[....] use huge amounts of material resources in order to convey their messages [...]" Through an essay in the fieldguide, the collective explains that their exhibition served as an experiment for them to think through sustainable and ecological curatorial practice and making, calling it an "auto-critique." The fieldguide documents the different sustainable interventions as well as the impacts on their ability to work ecologically, at various stages of exhibition, from the planning (of the exhibition), making (of the artworks), shipping (of the works and objects), and display (of works and objects). The collective also had to contend with carbon emissions and the desire to maintain low energy consumption through the use of technology, particularly in the case of presenting multimedia and media works in the exhibition. When the Covid-19 pandemic began, the exhibition was delayed, and the collective had to consider health and safety related to pandemic isolation and guidelines. They also confronted a shift to pro-plastic attitudes, pointing out that the plastics industry was able to "[....] lobby for the roll back of many of the environmental gains of the past five to ten years [....]"

The fieldguide itself was designed in a way that would limit its energy when it is dissemination and downloaded in PDF format of from online sources. The eco- design included: image dithering, default fonts, compression of the final PDF, limited colour choices, and simple tables to visualize data (as opposed to complicated graphics).

=== Le synthétique au coeur de l'humain (2023) ===
Le synthétique au coeur de l'humain ("Plastic Heart: Surface all the way through" in English) is a 2023 exhibition curated by The Synthetic Collective and held at the Canadian Cultural Centre at the Canadian Embassy in Paris, France. It proceeds the exhibition Plastic Heart: Surface all the way through held at the Art Museum at the University of Toronto in 2021. It differs from the previous exhibition in its adaptation to the Parisian context, addition of works by French artists and installations that respond to the local French context, and a selection of works that would limit the carbon footprint from object transportation. The exhibition includes the same data visualizations of the collective's research on microplastics and industrial plastic pellets, but the roster of artists in this exhibition includes Alain Resnais, Aude Pariset, Nyabo Leon Ouedraogo, Pierre Huyghe, and Patricia Corcoran, as well as artists from Plastic Heart: Surface all the way through. It does not include the works of Marianne Vierø, Mary Mattingly, and Christopher Mendoza like Plastic Heart: Surface all the way through (2021). This exhibition also includes a medallion of Saint Vincent de Paul, made out of hardwood. Following the 2021 exhibition and the Synthetic Collective's approach of "enough," the collective did not paint the gallery walls or patch any holes, and they reused the vinyl residues of a work by Xiaojing Yan from the Canadian Cultural Centre's previous exhibition. All of the labels accompanying the artworks and objects in the exhibition were written and created with liquid waste.

== Research on the Great Lakes ==
The Synthetic Collective's research and work centres on microplastic, plastic pollution, and industrial plastic pellets that end up on shorelines on beaches across the Laurentian Great Lakes. As Synthetic Collective member Kelly Wood discusses, the rate at which plastic waste is accumulating in bodies of water globally far exceeds the accumulation of any other form of waste in any other environment.

=== Microplastics and Plastic Pollution ===
The researchers note that plastic pellets are a global issue because; they can travel far from their original destination; they can hold minute biota that can increase the potential for invasive species to become established in different areas; and they have shown the potential to absorb and release different persistent organic pollutants or POPs.

== Publications ==
- Belontz, Sara L.; Corcoran, Patricia L.; Davis, Heather; Hill, Kathleen A.; Jazvac, Kelly; Robertson, Kirsty; Wood, Kelly (2019-08-01). "Embracing an interdisciplinary approach to plastics pollution awareness and action". Ambio. 48 (8): 855–866. doi:10.1007/s13280-018-1126-8. ISSN 1654-7209. PMC 6541668. PMID 30448996
  - This is a peer-reviewed journal article that discusses The Synthetic Collective's interdisciplinary approach to the problem of plastic pollution.
- Robertson, Kirsty, Heather Davis, Tegan Moore, Kelly Jazvac, Kelly Wood, Patricia Corcoran, Ian Arturo, Sara Belontz, Lorena Rios Mendoza, and Kathleen Hill (2021). "PLASTIC HEART: A DIY Fieldguide for Reducing the Environmental Impact of Art Exhibition". The Synthetic Collective.
  - This is a field-guide published by The Synthetic Collective that discusses their work and research around reducing environmental impacts of art exhibitions, using their exhibition Plastic Heart: Surface all the way through as a case study.
- Wood, Kelly (2019-01-02). "The Great Lakes: Accumulations". Photography and Culture. 12 (1): 125-131. doi10.1080/17514517.2019.1586197. ISSN 1751-4517.
  - This journal article discusses Kelly Wood's photographs in relation to The Synthetic Collective's research on plastic waste in the Great Lakes.
