= Dean of Toronto =

Anglican dean

The Dean of Toronto is an Anglican dean in the Diocese of Toronto of the Ecclesiastical Province of Ontario, based at the Cathedral Church of St. James in downtown Toronto, Ontario. The incumbent is also Rector of St. James Cathedral.

The incumbents have been:

Tenure	Incumbent	Notes
1867–1882	Henry James Grasett (1808–1882)	First Dean of Toronto, and father of Lieutenant-Colonel H. J. Grasett.
1882–1937	No appointment of Dean – duties usually undertaken by Rector. In 1883, the yet-to-be-built Cathedral of St. Alban the Martyr became by statute the first legal cathedral of the Diocese of Toronto. The Church of St. James legally became the cathedral in 1935, having been a parish church since the parish's inception in 1797.
1937–1961	Charles Edward Riley (1883–1972)
1961–1973	Walter Joseph Gilling (1906–1973)
1974–1986	Hugh Vernon Stiff (1916–1995)
1987–1994	Sheldon Duncan Abraham
1994–2016	Douglas Stoute	Husband of the Hon. Mary Lou Benotto of the Court of Appeal for Ontario, and brother of horse trainer Sir Michael Stoute.
2016–2018	Andrew Asbil	Became the 12th Bishop of Toronto in 2019.
2019–2022	Stephen Vail	Former Archdeacon of Trent-Durham.
2024–present	Stephen Hance	Former Dean of Derby.
