= Walter Gilling =

Canadian Anglican priest

Walter Joseph Gilling, D.D. (23 June 1906-21 July 1993) was a Canadian Anglican priest in the first two thirds of the 20th century.

Gilling was educated at Trinity College, Toronto. Ordained in 1936, his first posts were curacies in Toronto. He was Chaplain at his old college from 1937 to 1939; then a Chaplain in the Canadian Army Service Corps until 1946. He was Rector of St Luke, Peterborough, Ontario from 1946 to 1956; and its Archdeacon from 1953 to 1956 He was then Archdeacon without territorial jurisdiction from 1956 to 1961; and Dean of Toronto from that year until he retired in 1973.
