= Stephen Hance =

British Anglican priest

The Very Reverend Stephen Hance
- Dean of Toronto
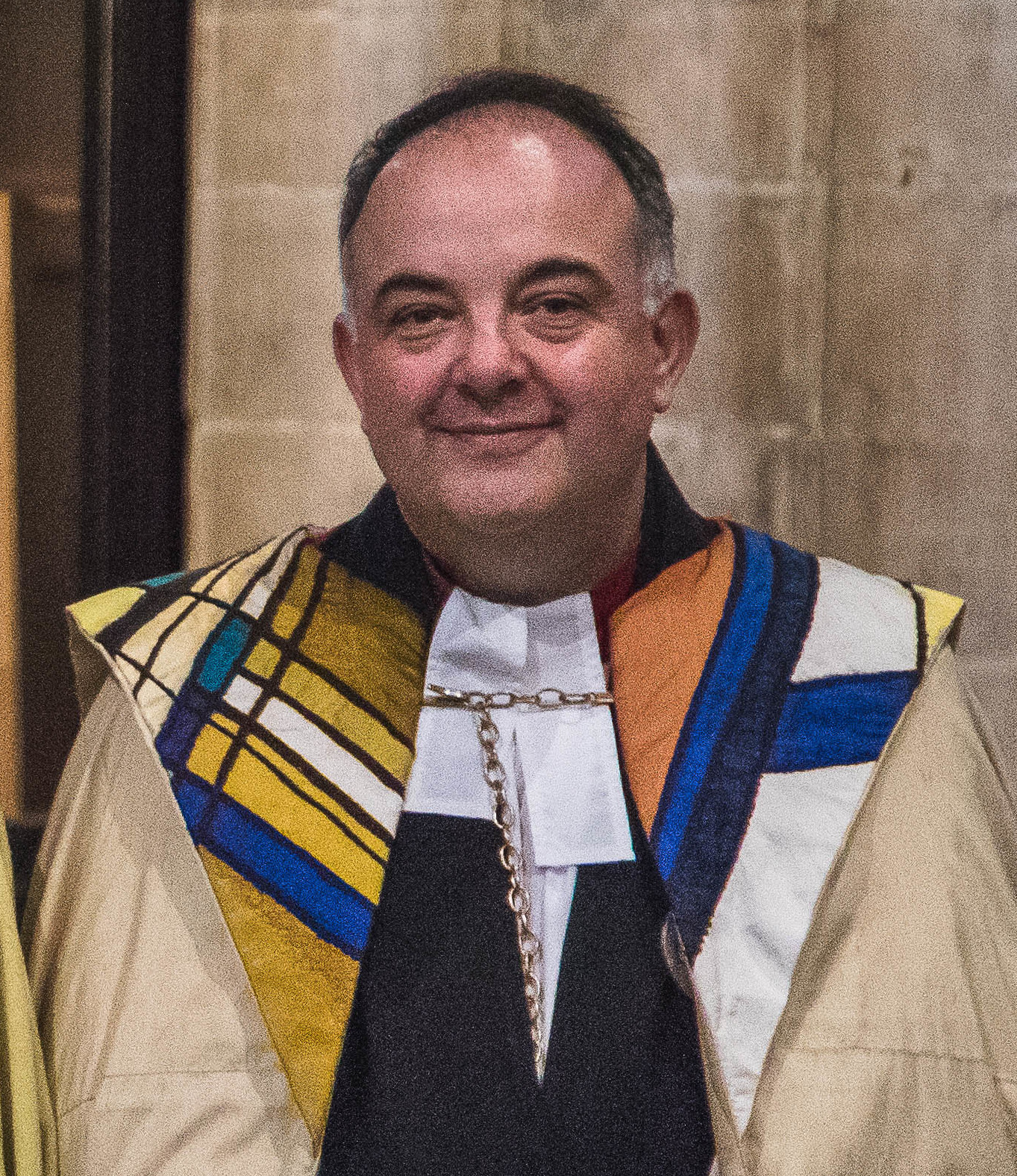
- Hance in March 2018
- Church: Church of England; Anglican Church of Canada
- In office: 2024–present
- Predecessor: Stephen Vail
- Other posts: National Lead for Evangelism (2017–2024); Canon Missioner of Southwark Cathedral (2013–2017); Dean of Derby (2017–2019)

Orders
- Ordination: 1993 (deacon); 1994 (priest) by Timothy Bavin

Personal details
- Born: Stephen John Hance; 16 April 1966 (age 60) Kisumu, Nyanza Province, Kenya
- Denomination: Anglicanism
- Spouse: Jacqui
- Children: 3
- Education: Portsmouth Polytechnic; St John's College, Nottingham; University of Nottingham; Asbury Theological Seminary

Stephen John Hance (born 16 April 1966) is a British Anglican priest. Since 2024, he has been Dean of Toronto and Rector of St. James Cathedral. He has previously served as National Lead for Evangelism and Witness for the Church of England, Dean of Derby, and Canon Missioner of Southwark Cathedral and Director of Mission and Evangelism for the Diocese of Southwark.

== Early life and education ==
Hance was born on 16 April 1966 in Kisumu, Kenya. He studied sociology at Portsmouth Polytechnic, graduating with a Bachelor of Science (BSc) degree in 1989. In 1990, he entered St John's College, Nottingham, an Open Evangelical Anglican theological college, to train for ordained ministry. During this time he also studied theology, and he graduated from the University of Nottingham with a Bachelor of Theology (BTh) degree in 1992. He undertook postgraduate studies in mission and ministry, and graduated from Nottingham with a Master of Arts (MA) degree in 1993. He then left theological college to be ordained in the Church of England. After a number of years of part-time study at Asbury Theological Seminary in Kentucky, United States, he completed a Doctor of Ministry (DMin) degree in missional church leadership in 2009.

== Ordained ministry ==
Hance was ordained in the Church of England as a deacon on 26 September 1993, and as a priest on 2 October 1994 — both times by Timothy Bavin, Bishop of Portsmouth, at Portsmouth Cathedral. From 1993 to 1996, he served his curacy at St Jude's Church, Southsea in the Diocese of Portsmouth. He then moved to the Diocese of London to join the Tollington Team as Team Vicar of St Mark's Church, Tollington Park. From 1997 to 1999, he was also a member of the Bishop of Stepney's Council.

In 1999, Hance moved to the Diocese of Southwark to take up his first incumbency. From 1999 to 2013, he served as Vicar of the Church of the Ascension, Balham Hill. From 1999 to 2004, he was also Director of Post-Ordination Training for the Kingston Episcopal Area. In 2013, he joined Southwark Cathedral as Canon Missioner and was also appointed Director of Mission and Evangelism for the Diocese of Southwark. In 2015, he was elected a member of the General Synod of the Church of England.

On 5 June 2017, it was announced that he would be the next Dean of Derby, the first among equals in the chapter of Derby Cathedral and the most senior priest in the Diocese of Derby. He was installed as dean during a service on 30 September 2017.

In 2019 he was appointed the Church of England's National Lead for Evangelism and Witness, based at Church House, Westminster; he resigned the Deanery on 30 September 2019 and took up the new role.

In October 2023, Hance was appointed Dean of Toronto and Rector of St. James Cathedral. He was installed in the Cathedral on 14 January 2024.

=== Views ===
Hance describes himself as a liberal Evangelical Anglican. He has spoken out against the perception that the Diocese of Southwark has a Liberal Catholic bias.

== Personal life ==
Hance is married to Jacqui and they have three children.

Anglican Communion titles
Preceded by Stephen Vail	Dean of Toronto; 2024 – present	Incumbent
