= Provost of Trinity College =

Provost of Trinity College may refer to:

- List of Provosts of Trinity College Dublin, Ireland
- List of Provosts of Trinity College, University of Toronto, Canada

== See also ==
- Trinity College (disambiguation)
- Provost (education)
