= Stephen Vail (priest) =

Canadian priest

Stephen Vail is a Canadian priest of the Anglican Church of Canada. He was Dean of Toronto and rector of St. James Cathedral.

== Ministry ==
Vail obtained a Bachelor of Science degree in chemistry from the University of King's College and a Bachelor of Arts degree in classics from Dalhousie University before studying theology at Wycliffe College at the University of Toronto. He was ordained in the Diocese of Nova Scotia and Prince Edward Island in 1991.

He served as assistant curate of St. Paul's, Halifax, and in the Parish of Cornwallis in Annapolis County before moving to the Diocese of Toronto in 2001. In the Diocese of Toronto, he served as incumbent of St. Bride's, Clarkson; St. John the Evangelist, Port Hope; and All Saints, Whitby. He was archdeacon of the Trent-Durham episcopal area until 2019.

In 2019, Vail was appointed the 8th Dean of Toronto and rector of St. James Cathedral, succeeding Andrew Asbil. He was installed on 8 September 2019 at the cathedral. He served as dean until his retirement in 2022. Peter Wall served as interim dean until his replacement, Stephen Hance, was installed in 2024.

He has two children.

Anglican Communion titles
| Preceded by Andrew Asbil | Dean of Toronto; 2019–2022 | Succeeded by Stephen Hance |
