= Arthur Sweatman =

Canadian Anglican bishop

The Most Reverend Arthur Sweatman
- Primate of the Anglican Church of Canada
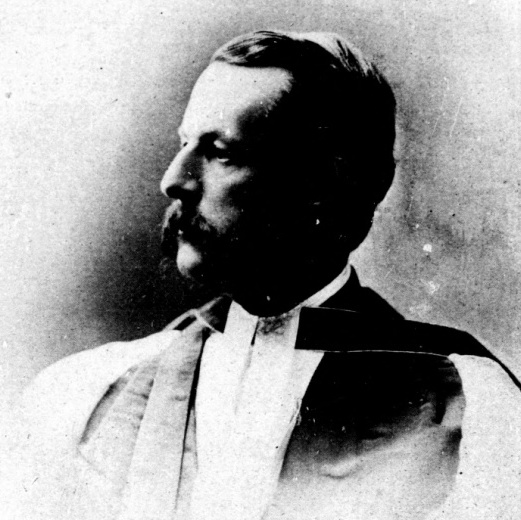
- Installed: 1907
- Term ended: 1909
- Predecessor: William Bond
- Successor: Samuel Matheson

Personal details
- Born: 19 November 1834 London, England
- Died: 24 January 1909 (aged 74) Toronto, Ontario, Canada

Arthur Sweatman (1834–1909) was a Canadian Anglican bishop and the third Primate of the Anglican Church of Canada.

== Early life ==
Sweatman was born on 19 November 1834 in London, England, to parents John and Anne. His education began in two London private schools, followed by education at University College School. At the age of fifteen, Sweatman began to teach in the Sunday school of Christ Church, Marylebone. In 1859, Sweatman received a Bachelor of Arts degree from Christ's College, Cambridge, and was ordained as a deacon the same year. Sweatman soon distinguished himself as a pioneer in the movement for boys' clubs, beginning with the founding of the Islington Youths' Institute in 1860. In 1865, whilst curate of St Stephen's in Canonbury, he impressed the visiting headmaster of Huron College, Upper Canada with his work with youths. The visiting headmaster convinced Sweatman to become the first headmaster of the London Collegiate Institute] in Huron, serving there until 1871. Until 1872, he was the mathematics master at Upper Canada College, leaving there to become the rector of Grace Church in Brantford until 1874. From 1874 to 1876, Sweatman again served as the principal of the London Collegiate Institute, which had been renamed Hellmuth Boys’ College. From 1876 to 1879, he was the priest in charge of New St Paul's, Woodstock.

== Bishop of Toronto ==
On 3 February 1879, the second bishop of the Diocese of Toronto, Alexander Bethune, died. Later that month, the synod met to elect a new bishop. Most of the clergy were inclined to vote for George Whitaker, the provost of the University of Trinity College. However, the lay synod delegates were opposed to the clergy candidate and proposed Edward Sullivan as their candidate, who was then on his way from Chicago to Montreal to take up the rectory there. Neither candidate received the necessary number of votes to become the bishop. Sweatman was elected as a compromise between the clergymen and laymen of the synod after five days of balloting.

On 1 May 1879, the Bishop of Quebec consecrated Sweatman in St. James' Cathedral, Toronto. On 10 June of the same year, Sweatman made his views clear to the first synod under his presidency. His views were not radical, but of moderation. He immediately set to work, transforming a debt-ridden diocese into a financially stable one, as well as allowing social works consistent with the Oxford Movement. In 1884, Sweatman recognized the foundation of the Sisterhood of St. John the Divine, an Anglican religious order of women dedicated to nursing, education and other charitable endeavors, led by Hannah Grier Coome. Although they were initially criticized as "papist," their service during the North-West Rebellion earned praise and acceptance. Rt. Rev. Sweatman also worked towards a grand new cathedral for Toronto. In 1885, the trustees of the land reserved for the future cathedral donated $2,000 towards his cause, possibly to enhance the property value of the site. Before the end of the year, a building had been erected on the site to house the bishop and his family. Although St. Alban's Cathedral was eventually completed to some extent, its construction incurred heavy debts for the diocese. This project was viewed by Sweatman as one of his most disappointing ventures.

== Later life ==
In 1905, Sweatman suffered a seizure, and in 1907 became the Archbishop of Toronto. The same year, he was elected Metropolitan of Canada and the Primate of All Canada, the third since the position's creation. Two years later, on 24 January 1909, Sweatman died of bronchial pneumonia.
