= Kenneth Deane =

Kenneth Deane may refer to:

- Kenneth Deane (police officer), policeman convicted of criminal negligence
- Kenneth Deane (swimmer) (1921–1997), English swimmer

== See also ==
- Kenneth Dean (disambiguation)
