= Roula Partheniou =

Canadian artist (born 1977)

Roula Partheniou (born 1977) is a Canadian contemporary artist. She currently practices in Sackville, New Brunswick.

== Biography ==
Partheniou was born in 1977 in Niagara Falls, Ontario. She was educated at the University of Guelph, where she received a bachelor of fine arts degree in 2001. She lives and works in Toronto and is known for her installations that make use of minimalist forms. These forms often aestheticize everyday objects such as the Rubik's Cube, beach balls, books, tennis balls and bottle caps, at the same time as they imitate the original form of the object. Art critic Terence Dick has said that Partheniou's work "sits intriguingly in the middle ground between the essence of something, and the instance of it".

She is the co-founder of artists' editions press, Nothing Else Press.

== Collections ==
Her work is held in numerous private and public collections, including the University of Toronto Art Collection, the National Gallery of Canada Library and Archives, Munich Re, The Bank of Montreal, and TD Bank.

== Bibliography ==
- Matotek, Jennifer; Davies, Jon; Jurakic, Ivan (February 27, 2018). Roula Partheniou: Index. Black Dog Publishing. ISBN 9781911164036. OCLC 945357416.
