= Cathedral Church of St. James (Toronto) =

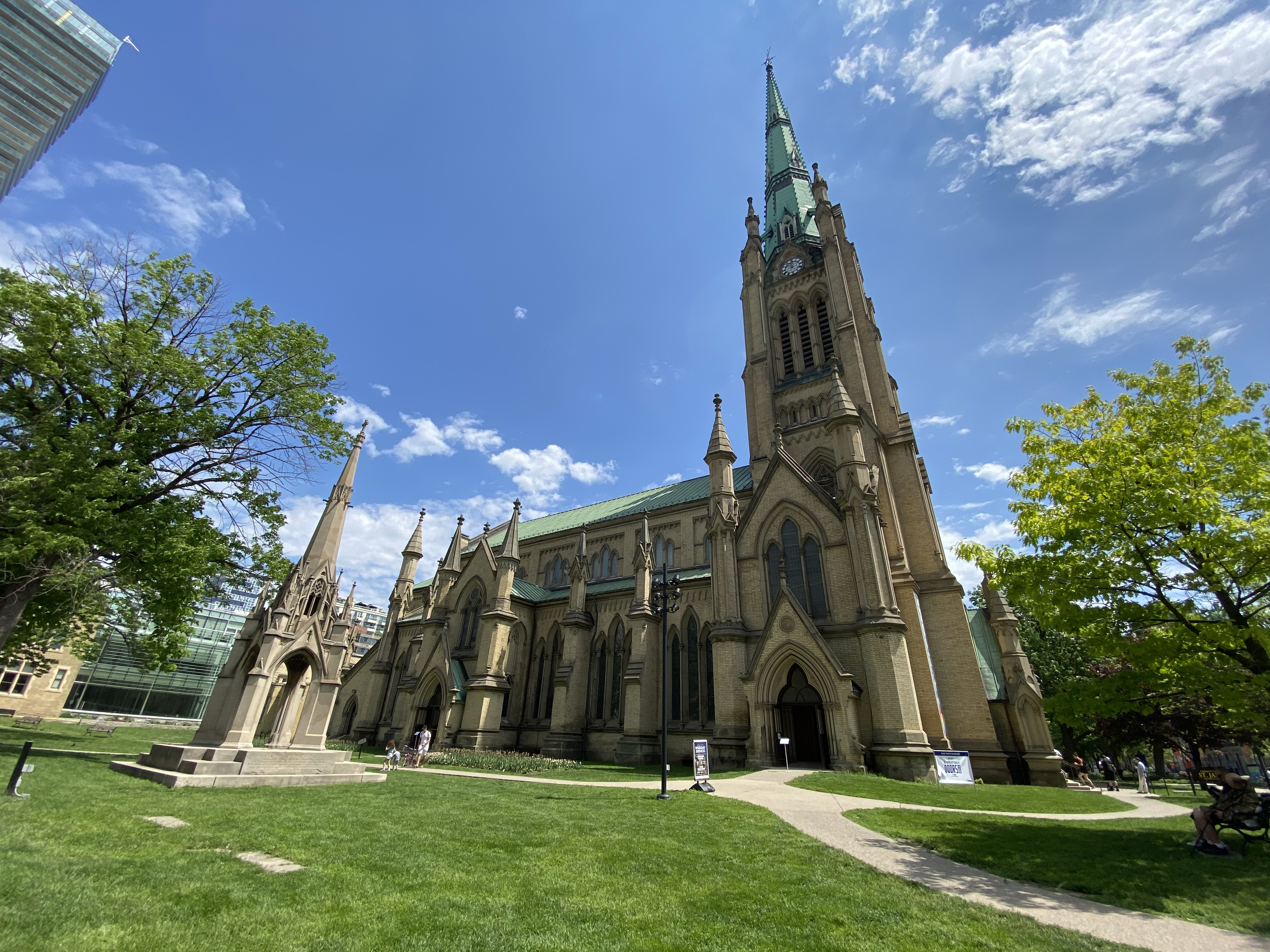
- Cathedral Church of St. James
- 43°39′01″N 79°22′26″W
- Location: 106 King Street East; Toronto, Ontario, Canada
- Denomination: Anglican Church of Canada
- Churchmanship: High church
- Website: stjamescathedral.ca

History
- Founded: 1797
- Dedication: James the Great
- Consecrated: 1853

Administration
- Province: Ontario
- Diocese: Toronto
- Deanery: St. James

Clergy
- Bishop: Andrew Asbil
- Rector: Stephen Hance (Dean of Toronto)
- Vicar: Stephen Fields
- Priests: Beth Benson; Walter Hannam (Vicar of St. Bartholomew's)

Ontario Heritage Act
- Type: Municipally designated
- Designated: September 26, 1977
- By-law No.: 588-77

The Cathedral Church of St. James is an Anglican cathedral in Downtown Toronto, Ontario, Canada. It is the location of the oldest congregation in the city, with the parish being established in 1797. The church, the fourth on the site, began construction in 1850 and opened for services on June 19, 1853. It was one of the largest buildings in the city at that time. It was designed by Frederick William Cumberland and is an example of Gothic Revival architecture.

The church building is designated under the Ontario Heritage Act. It has been the episcopal seat of the Bishop of Toronto since 1936 after the cathedra was moved from the Diocese's first cathedral, the Cathedral of St. Alban the Martyr. The church's choir school is Royal St. George's College in The Annex neighbourhood, which is open to boys in grades 3 through 12.

== History ==
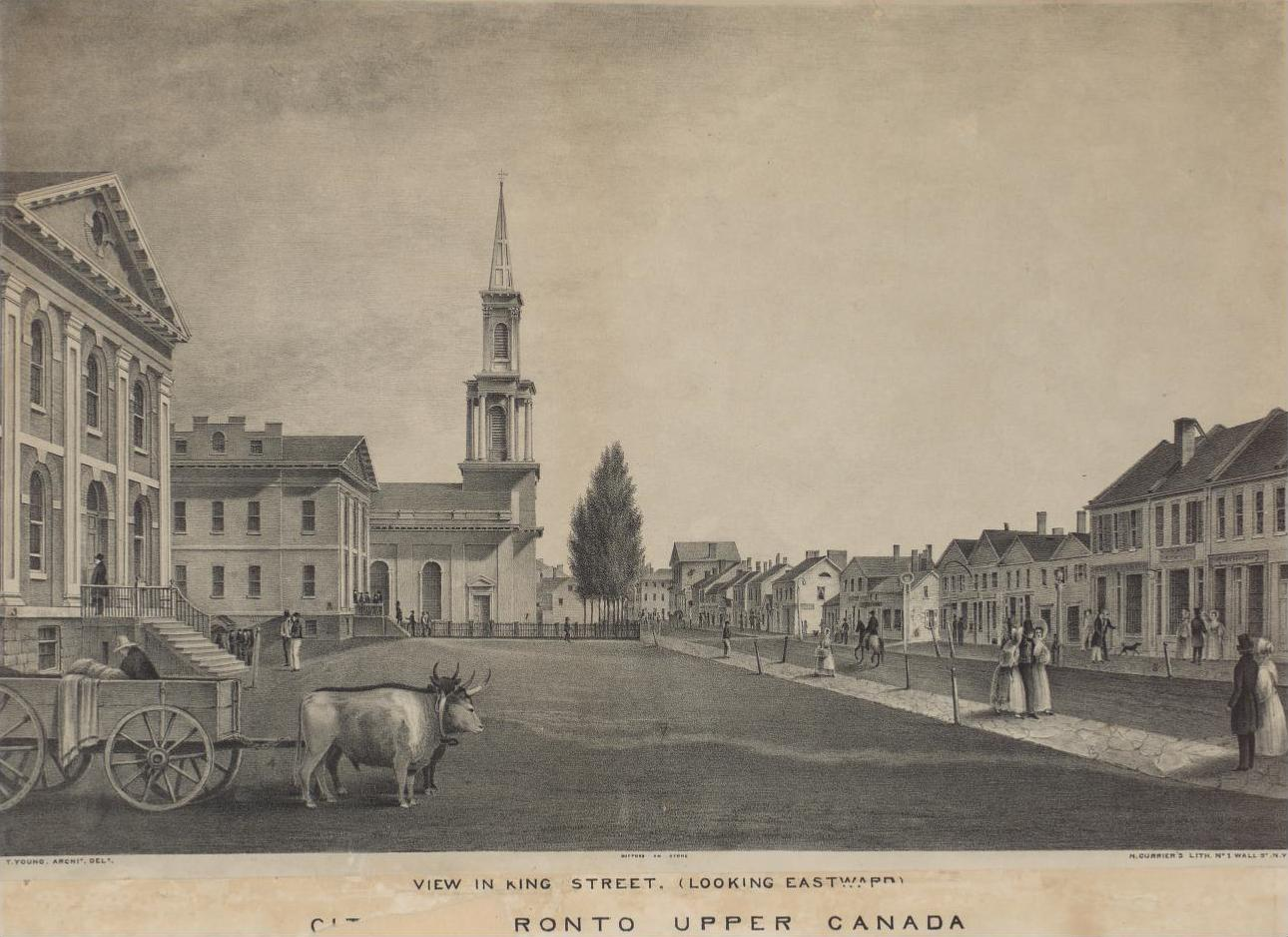
View of King Street, with the 1833 church in the background. The building was the second church to be built there.

The Anglican parish of St. James was established in 1797 in the then-town of York. In 1807, the first church was built of wood. It was used in 1813 as a hospital during the War of 1812, and it was subsequently robbed and damaged by the American troops. Shortly after, in 1818, the church was enlarged and a bell tower addition was completed. The bell was used as a fire bell for the town.

In 1833, the wooden structure was taken down and replaced by a stone structure in the Neoclassical style. In January 1839, the church burned down and was reconstructed. It reopened in December 1839, and the church became a cathedral in 1936. St. James Cemetery, the parish cemetery, was moved in the 1840s to St. James-the-Less at Parliament and Bloor streets, although there are still unmarked graves under the church parking lot.

In 1849, the building was destroyed in the first Great Fire of Toronto. An international architectural competition was held to replace it, drawing eleven entries from Canada and the United States. The Gothic Revival design by Frederick William Cumberland and Thomas Ridout placed first, followed by the submissions of John Ostell and Kivas Tully respectively.

Construction began on July 1, 1850. The cornerstone was laid on November 20, 1850 by the Bishop of Toronto John Strachan and Reverend Grasset. Inside the cornerstone was placed a sealed bottle containing a Scobie's 1851 almanac, reports and documents of the Church Society, and a collection of coins. The Ohio stone and brick church was opened to the public in 1853. Its original organ was built in 1853 by Samuel Russell Warren. Upon his death in 1867, Strachan, Toronto's first Anglican bishop, was buried in a vault beneath the high altar. Dean Henry James Grasett (1808–1882) was also buried here.

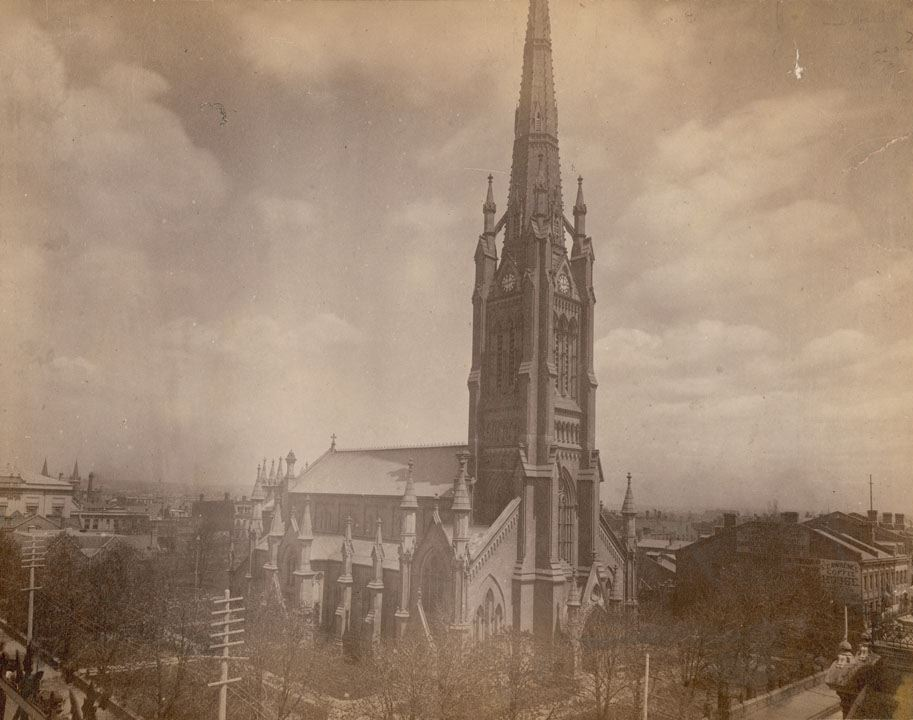
The current church building, c. 1890s

It was not until 1873–1874 that the tower and spire, the transepts, and the pinnacles and finials were completed by architect Henry Langley. The spire was the tallest structure in Canada upon completion and would remain so for another 25 years until the construction of Toronto's Old City Hall. The tower's clock was installed one year later.

In 1889, side galleries and aisles were removed, and the choir stalls and organ console were installed in the chancel. Albert Ham served as organist and choirmaster at the church from 1897 to 1933. In 1936, St. George's Chapel was dedicated, and the organ was overhauled by Casavant Frères.

Major renovations were completed in 1982. The parish celebrated its bicentenary in 1997, when the peal of 12 change ringing bells was installed as the largest peal in North America. They are one of only nine peals of 12 bells outside the British Isles, and one of only two in North America, the other being located at Trinity Church in New York City.

To raise money to help pay for the rising costs of maintaining the cathedral, part of the grounds were planned to be sold to a condominium developer. Part of the land was to have been part of the original cemetery, and the developers planned to move the graves in order to clear the land. A public outcry ensued, and a deal was made to sell off a parking lot to the northwest of the cathedral for the SP!RE condominium development.

== Architecture ==
St. James Cathedral's Gothic Revival architecture is reflected throughout the structure. Every part of a Gothic cathedral is directly related to a "core dimension" which is used as an effort to achieve harmony and organic unity within the building where everything is linked rationally and proportionally, creating a coherent whole. Every element in the cathedral—including the stained glass windows, the pointed arches, high ceilings, the pinnacles, even the flying buttresses—allow as much light as possible to flood the interior. The Gothic style means an aesthetically unified whole, but the combination of different architectural elements such as the ribbed vaults, flying buttresses, and pointed arches allows for generous illumination of the interior space with natural light.

=== Exterior ===
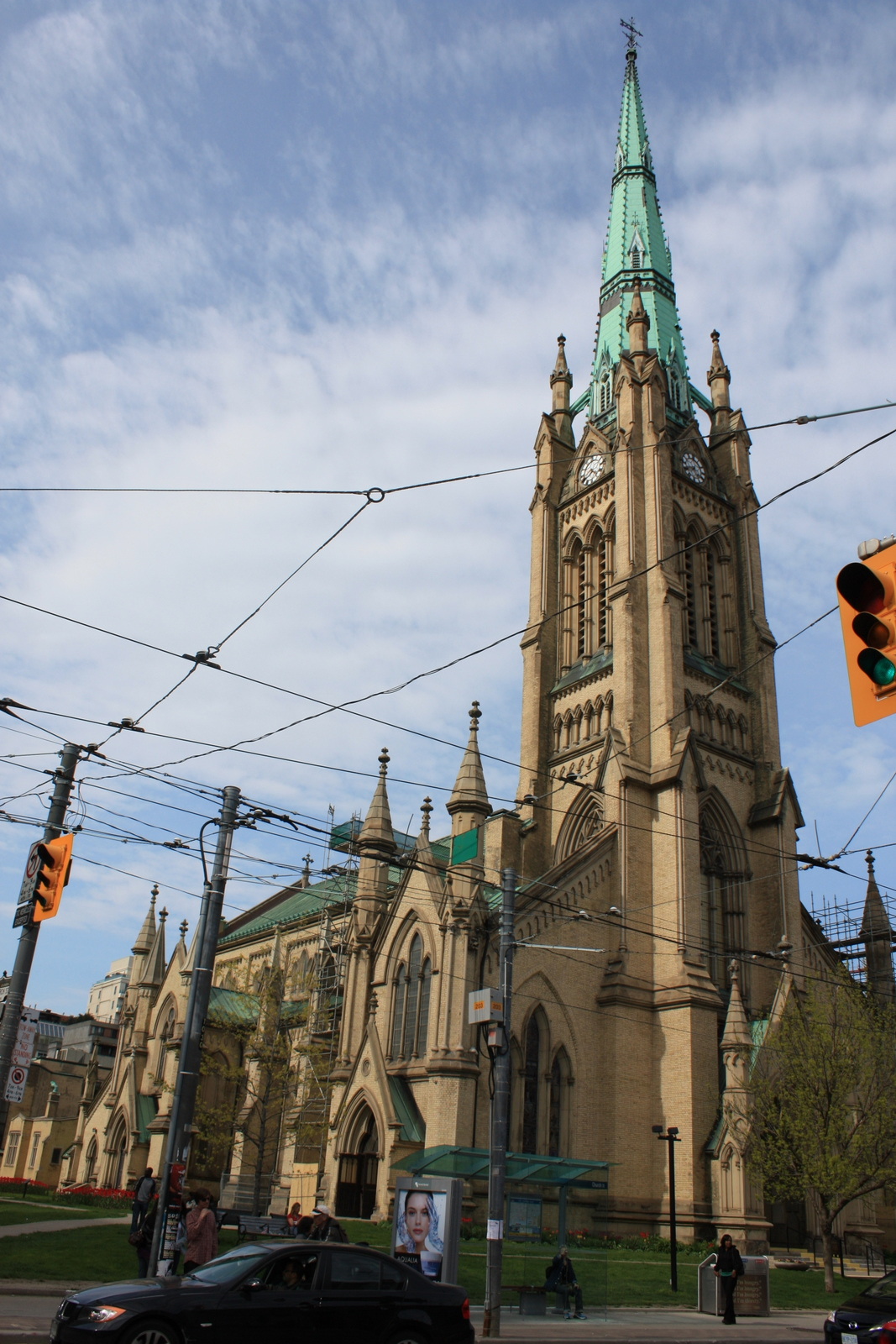
The exterior features several spires built of stone.

The cathedral's exterior is composed of white brick and Ohio sandstone. Several layers of brick in the facade create strong, square inset designs around the lancet windows of the clerestory. This allows for a play of light and shadow that dramatizes the heaviness of the wall, and was the effect of emphasizing the wall's depth by partially cutting into it. The spires are built of stone and decorated with pinnacles and dormers, and ball flower ornaments atop the pinnacles. Tower walls are reinforced with square and octagonal buttresses that taper abruptly with generous weatherings at transitional points and terminate in pinnacles, some with slender colonettes abutting chamfered edges, with ribbed, stepped, or gable caps. These buttresses are accented by heavy weatherings in lighter coloured stone (creating visual contrast while drawing attention to the points of stress on the building), and topped with pinnacles, thus emphasizing their massiveness, structural function, and verticality. They provide spatial rhythm on the east and west facades.

A careful balance between horizontal and vertical elements can be observed throughout the interior and exterior of the church. On the exterior, a dog-toothed fret runs along the aisle roofline, while on the interior, a band of continuous painted bosses similarly run along the top of the aisle wall. These horizontal bands balance the composition against the verticality of the exterior tower and pinnacles, and the interior pointed arches of the nave arcade, creating a sense of stability and repose.

At 92.9 metres (305 ft), the tower and spire have remained the tallest in Canada and the second tallest in North America after St. Patrick's Cathedral, New York—although the spire of St. James is still shorter than the dome of Saint Joseph's Oratory in Montreal, which is the tallest church in the Western Hemisphere. The tower has five bells that still ring through the city today, and the chiming clock is "one of the finest examples of a chiming public clock anywhere in the world." At the turn of the 20th century, St James' Cathedral was still the tallest building in Toronto, and was often the first thing immigrants noticed when they stepped off the train at the old Union Station.

The total length of the cathedral is 198 feet (60 m), with a maximum width of 98 feet (30 m). A four sided arch with steeple was erected alongside the cathedral as a military memorial. St. James Park neighbors the building.

=== Interior ===
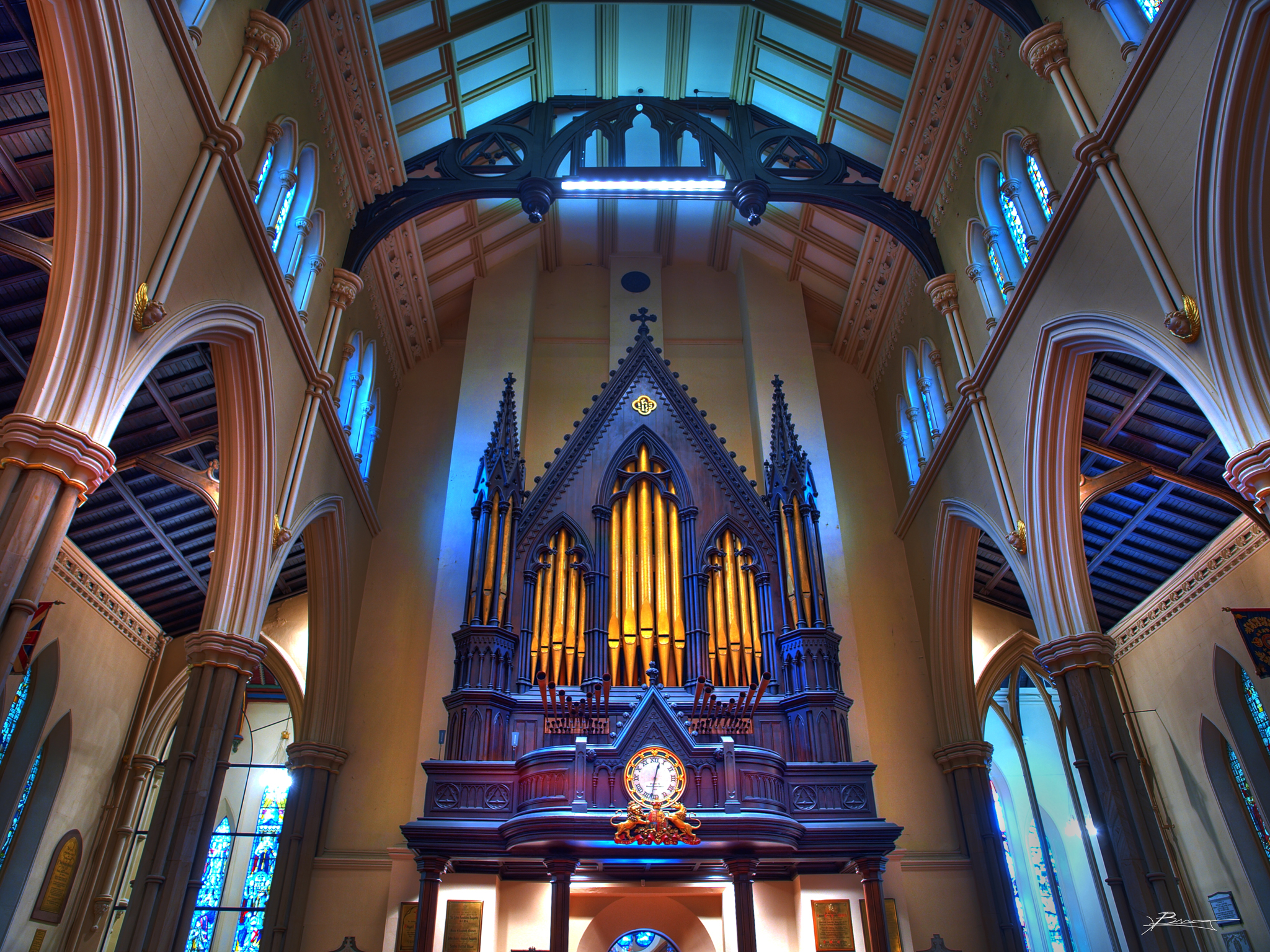
The pipe organ is located atop the principal entrance of the building.

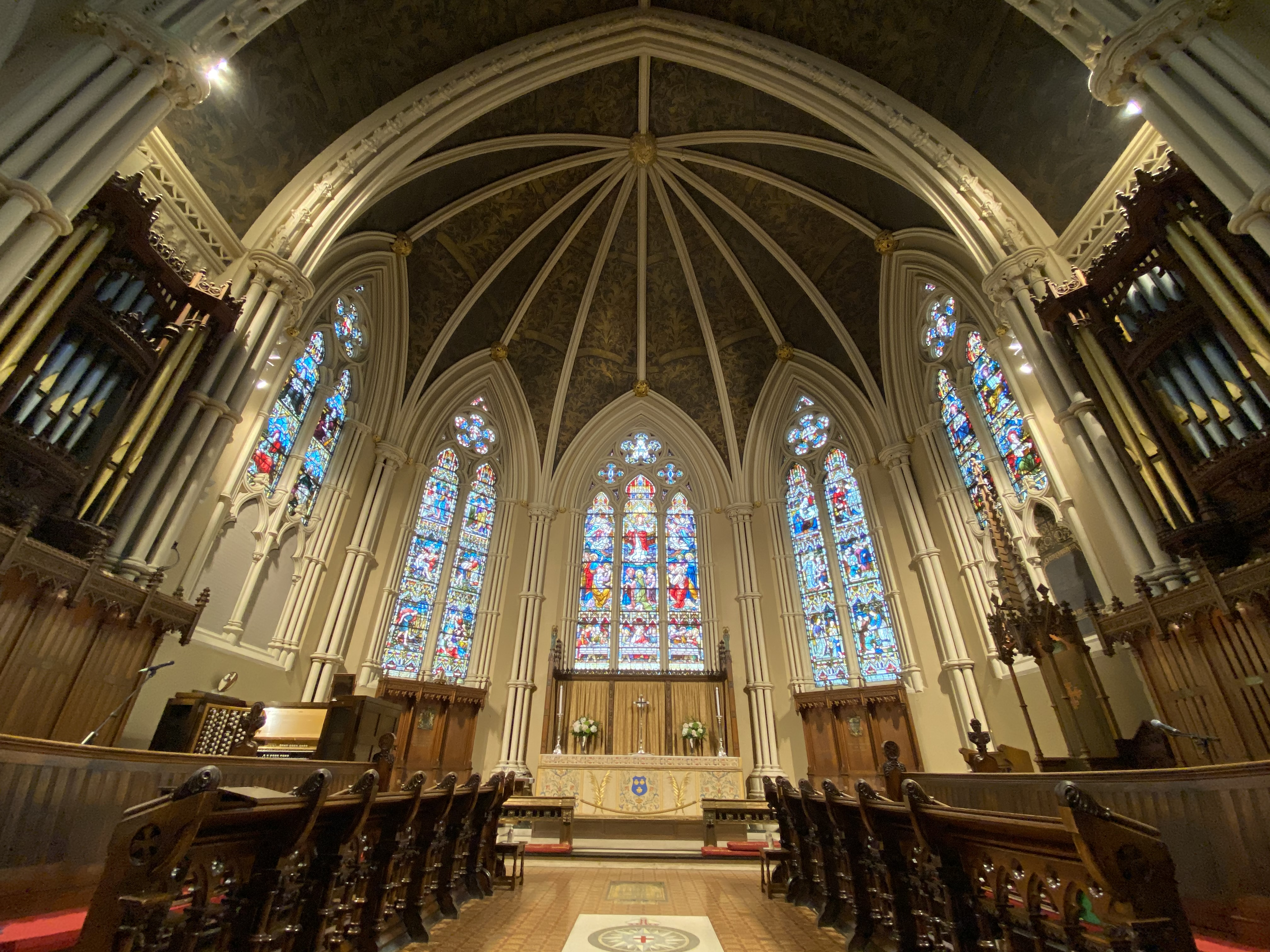
Stained-glass windows atop the church's altar

Over the principal entrance, a carved organ cover rises over a royal coat of arms, while Minton tile-work lies underfoot. The organ has 5000 pipes and includes the original gallery organ from 1853 over the main south entrance at the rear of the cathedral. Trumpet pipes have since been added to the gallery organ. The front chancel and aisle pipes were added in 1916.

In the interior, the absence of galleries frees the vertical movement of the arcade and clerestory. A high-pitched roof of heavy timber, crowned with enriched ribs and carved bosses creates a sense of shelter to the nave. The exposed rafters of the roof of the nave are articulated structural elements, and broad tie-beams and decorative cornices accent the joints. The elegant vault of the apsidal chancel, though expressing the thrust from the vault in the ribs that flow down to the ground, is a sham vault of lath and plaster that is coloured to represent stone.

The division of the interior into six bays is reflected on the exterior by the buttresses along the east and west elevations. Pews flow through the arcade in rows of four, gallery fronts, and chancel panelling is all black walnut, as are the Corinthian capitals. Glazing bars of windows in sash of varying widths are reminiscent of Gothic tracery, creating divisions in the stained glass.

The cathedral is oriented on a north–south axis, whereas the traditional orientation is on an east–west axis with the altar at the east end. The orientation, decided by the design committee at the time, conforms to the symbolic representation of the church at the time, when the conflict with the American troops was apparent. The pews are oriented in central rows, with aisles on each side. The comfort of the seating was not highly regarded in the design.

== Notable funerals ==
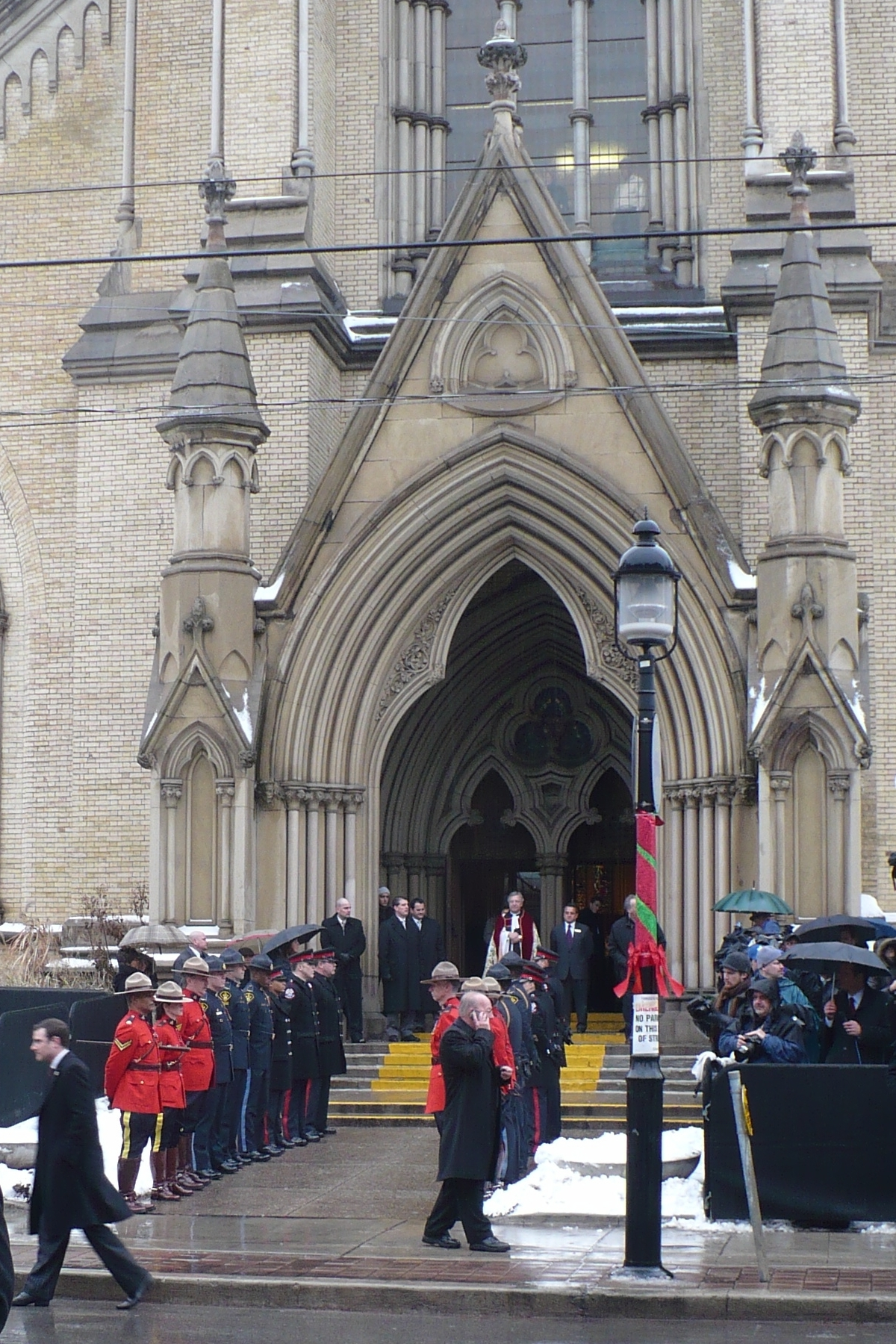
The funeral for Ted Rogers was held at the church in 2008.

In addition to the funerals of former Bishops of Toronto, there have been notable funerals at St. James for other prominent people from the Toronto area, including:

- George Snell (1907–2006), former Bishop of Toronto from 1966 to 1972 – funeral in 2006
- Ted Rogers (1939–2008), businessman and founder of Rogers Communications – funeral on December 9, 2008
- Jim Flaherty (1949–2014), former Ontario MPP, federal MP and minister of finance – state funeral on April 16, 2014
- Rob Ford (1969–2016), former mayor of Toronto and city councillor (Ward 2) – civic funeral on March 30, 2016

Rev. George Okill Stuart, who served from 1800 to 1812, and the Rev. John Strachan have the only graves located within the cathedral.

== See also ==
- Dean of Toronto
- List of Anglican churches in Toronto
- List of cathedrals in Canada
- List of oldest buildings and structures in Toronto
- List of tallest structures built before the 20th century
