= George Whitaker (Canadian educator) =

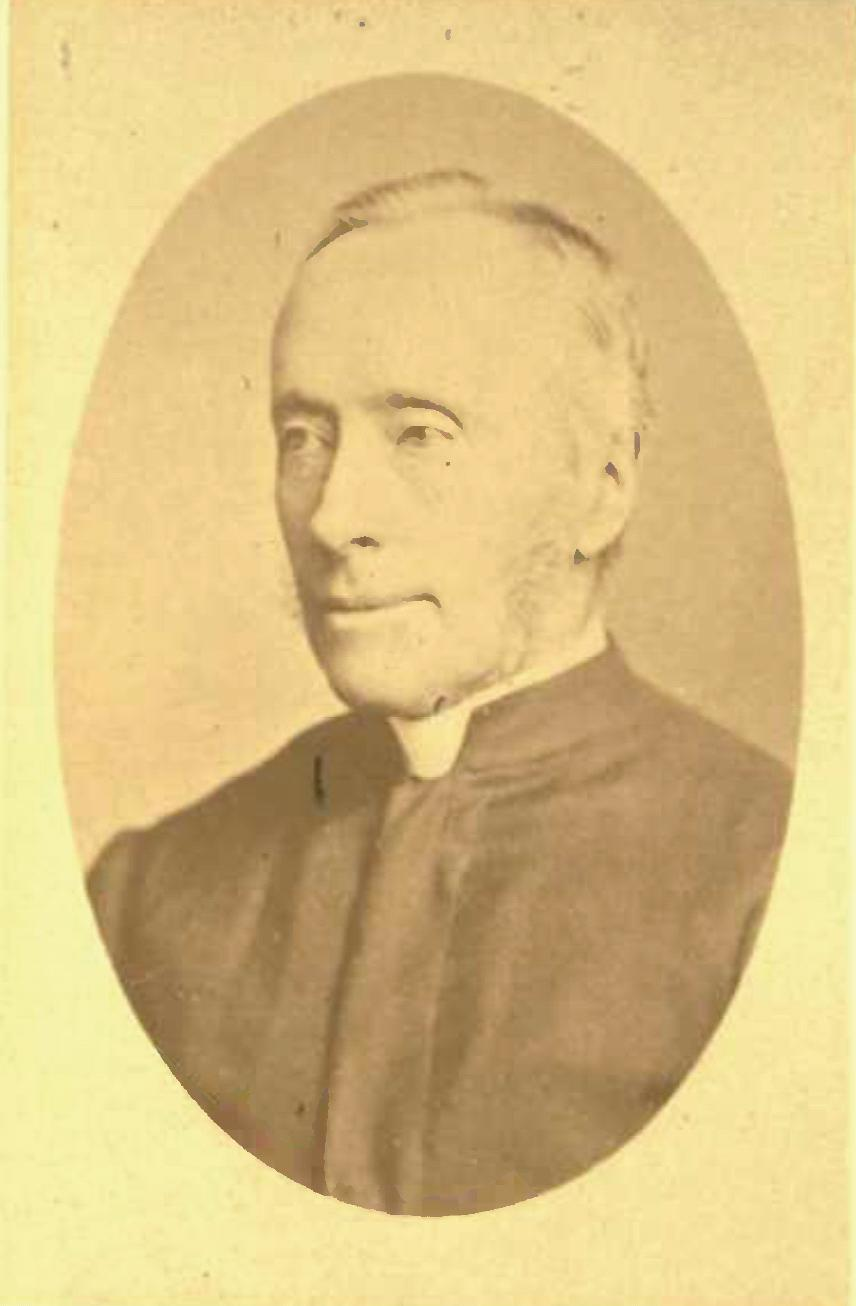
- A plate of Whitaker taken in the last years of his term as Provost of Trinity

1st Provost of the University of Trinity College
- In office 1851–1881
- Preceded by: Position established
- Succeeded by: Charles W. E. Body

Personal details
- Born: 9 October 1811 Bratton, Wiltshire
- Died: 27 May 1882 (aged 70) Newton Toney
- Education: Queens' College, Cambridge (MA)
- Occupation: clergyman and educator

George Whitaker (9 October 1811 – 27 August 1882) was an English-Canadian clergyman and educator.

== Early life ==
Whitaker was born into a Baptist family in Bratton, Wiltshire, the eighth child of Philip Whitaker, a farmer, and his wife Anne Andrews. Two of the couple's older sons, Alfred and Edward, became solicitors, Alfred at Frome and Edward in London.

An eighteenth-century member of the same Whitaker family of Bratton was Jeffery Whitaker, a local schoolmaster who left a diary for the years 1739–1741 which was published by the Wiltshire Record Society in 1993.

Whitaker received his early education at Frome Grammar School and then joined Charterhouse School, then in Charterhouse Square near the City of London. He attended the school as a day boy while living with his brother Edward. He matriculated at Queens' College, Cambridge, in 1829 and graduated BA in 1833 and MA in 1836. In 1832, while a student, he was baptized into the Church of England at Bratton Parish Church. This came at the beginning of the academic year in which he would need to subscribe to the Church of England's Thirty-Nine Articles to take his degree.

== Career ==
Whitaker was elected a foundation fellow of his college in 1834 and the next year became a university lecturer in classics. He was ordained a deacon on 4 June 1837 and took the orders of a priest on 27 May the following year.

In 1840 he was appointed Vicar of Oakington, Cambridgeshire, a living in the gift of his college.

He served as the first provost and professor of divinity of the University of Trinity College, now federated with the University of Toronto, from its opening in 1852 (when it had just thirty students) until his retirement in 1881. From 1875 he was also Archdeacon of York, Toronto.

After ending his career in Toronto, Whitaker retired to his home county of Wiltshire as Rector of Newton Toney, near Salisbury, England. He died in August 1882 and was buried at Newton Toney.

== Family ==
On 22 October 1844, at Bath, Somerset, George Whitaker married Arundel Charlotte Burton, the daughter of the Rev. Richard Burton, born in Sumatra, where her father had been a Baptist missionary, and brought up in Somerset in the west of England. George and Arundel Whitaker had at least eight children.

== Publications ==
- Two letters to the lord bishop of Toronto, in reply to charges brought by the lord bishop of Huron against the theological teaching of Trinity College, Toronto (Toronto, 1860)
- St John the Baptist, an exemplar to Christian ministers: a sermon preached in the chapel of Trinity College, Toronto, on Sunday, 24 June 1860 (Toronto, 1860)
- Soberness of mind; a sermon preached in the chapel of Trinity College, Toronto, on Sunday, 25 June 1865 (Toronto, 1865)
- The office of ritual in Christian worship: a sermon preached at St. George’s Church, St Catharines, on Wednesday, 4 April 1866 (Toronto, 1866)
- The duty of mutual toleration by parties within the church (in Dominion Churchman, Toronto, 11 & 25 July 22 August, 19 September 17 October, and 5 December 1878)
- Sermons preached in Toronto; for the most part in the chapel of Trinity College (London and Toronto, 1882)

Academic offices
New title college founded	Provost of the University of Trinity College; 1852–1881	Succeeded by Charles W. E. Body
