= Andrew Asbil =

Canadian Anglican bishop

The Right Reverend Andrew Asbil
- 12th Bishop of Toronto
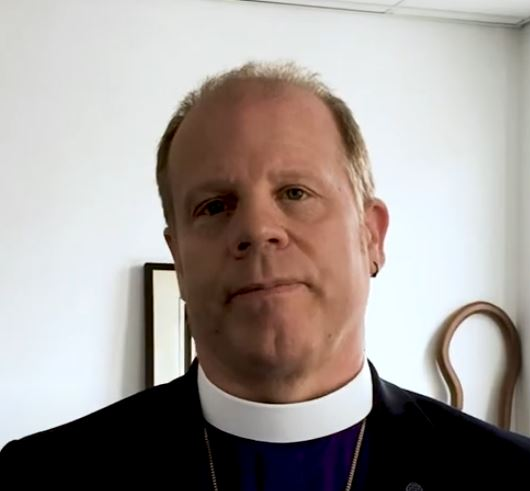
- Bishop Asbil in 2019
- Church: Anglican Church of Canada
- Province: Ontario
- Diocese: Toronto
- In office: 2018–present
- Predecessor: Colin Johnson
- Other posts: Dean of Toronto, 2016–2018

Orders
- Ordination: 1989 (priesthood)
- Consecration: September 29, 2018 by Colin Johnson

Personal details
- Born: 1961 (age 64–65)
- Denomination: Anglican
- Parents: Walter Asbil
- Education: University of Waterloo; Huron University College

Andrew John Asbil (born 1961) is a Canadian Anglican clergyman who has served as 12th bishop of Toronto since January 2019, succeeding Colin Johnson. His father, Walter Asbil, was Bishop of Niagara from 1991 to 1997.

== Life and career ==
Asbil attended the University of Waterloo and subsequently received his Master of Divinity degree in 1988 from Huron University College in London, Ontario. He was ordained to the priesthood in 1989 and then served the Anglican Church of Canada in the dioceses of Niagara and Toronto.

He was Dean of Toronto from 2016 until his consecration as bishop in September 2018. On January 1, 2019, he became the diocesan bishop and was installed at the Cathedral Church of St. James in Toronto on January 13, 2019.

Anglican Communion titles
Preceded by Douglas Stoute	Dean of Toronto; 2016–2018	Succeeded by Stephen Vail
Preceded by Colin Johnson	Bishop of Toronto; 2019–present	Incumbent
