= Ken Dean (Australian footballer) =

Australian rules footballer and coach

Personal information
- Full name: Ken Dean
- Born: 10 August 1938
- Original team: North Colts
- Height: 178 cm (5 ft 10 in)
- Weight: 79 kg (174 lb)

Playing career^{1}
Years	Club	Games (Goals)
1956–1967	North Melbourne	159 (17)
- ^{1} Playing statistics correct to the end of 1967.

Ken Dean (born 10 August 1938) is a former Australian rules footballer who played with North Melbourne in the Victorian Football League (VFL).

Dean was a defender, seen mostly in a back pocket, but started out as a half-forward. He came to the club from North Colts, as a 17-year-old in 1956. Many of his early appearances were made beside his brother Norm. Their father, Fred Dean, had also played for North Melbourne.

He left to coach Victoria Football Association club Sunshine in 1968.
