= Cathedral of St. Alban the Martyr =

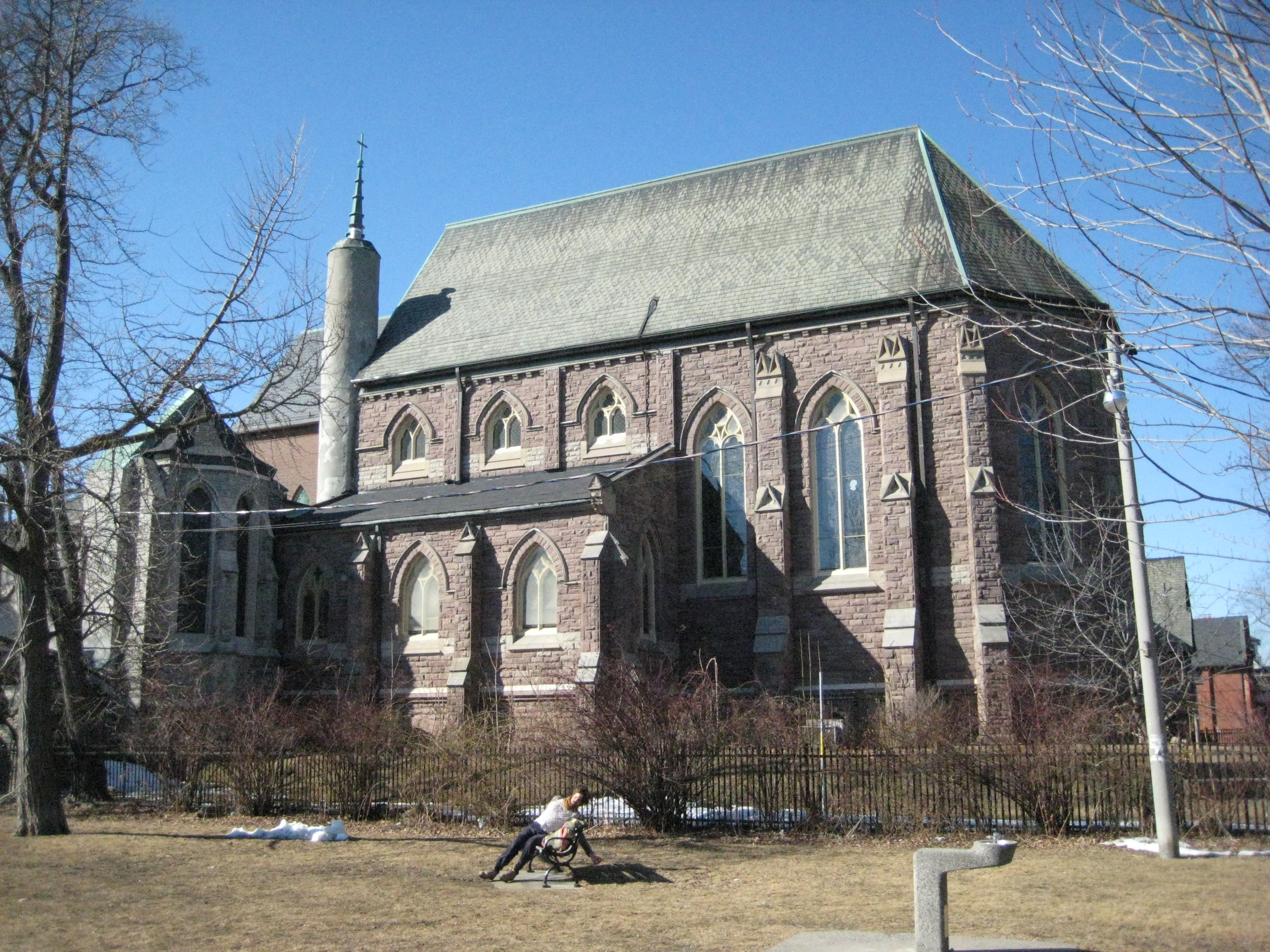
- The completed chancel in 2010
- Cathedral of St. Alban the Martyr
- 43.6689°N 79.4106°W
- Location: 100 Howland Avenue; Toronto, Ontario
- Denomination: Anglican Church of Canada

History
- Founder: Arthur Sweatman
- Dedication: St. Alban the Martyr
- Consecrated: 1889

Architecture
- Architect: Richard C. Windeyer Sr.
- Style: Gothic Revival
- Groundbreaking: 1885
- Completed: Never completed, work halted in 1914

Administration
- Province: Ontario

Ontario Heritage Act
- Type: Municipally designated
- Designated: June 15, 1992
- By-law No.: 438-92
- Diocese: Toronto

The Cathedral of St. Alban the Martyr is an unfinished Anglican church in Toronto, Ontario, which serves as the school chapel of Royal St. George's College.

Completed in 1891, what stands today is only two-thirds of the planned Gothic Revival church designed by Richard C. Windeyer, Sr. to serve as the cathedral of the Anglican Diocese of Toronto. Though only the chancel was completed, the church still held cathedral status from its construction until 1936 and is still referred to as such today.

The church is designated by the City of Toronto under Part IV of the Ontario Heritage Act as being of cultural heritage value or interest. It has the only double-hammerbeam roof in Canada.

== History ==
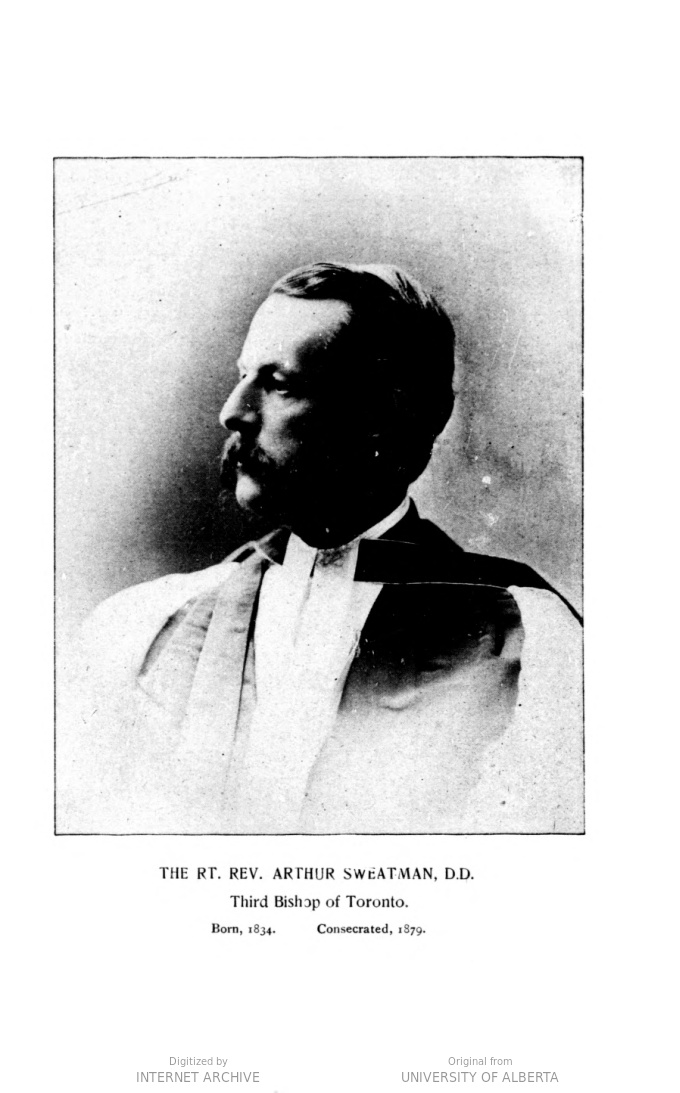
Bishop Sweatman

=== Initial planning ===
Since its founding in 1839, the de facto cathedral of the Anglican Diocese of Toronto and seat of the Bishop of Toronto had been the Church of St. James on King Street. However, the parishioners of St. James's were not pleased with this arrangement and refused to give up ownership of the church to the diocese as they had financed its construction themselves. Toronto's first bishop, John Strachan, set up a cathedral establishment fund in 1843 to eventually build a monumental cathedral to serve as his seat. This vision was not realized by Strachan nor his immediate successor, and it was not until 1884 when Arthur Sweatman, 3rd Bishop of Toronto, purchased four and a half acres in the newly developed Seaton Village that Toronto appeared to be getting its own purpose-built Anglican cathedral on par with the great cathedrals of England.

The cathedral was to be dedicated to St. Alban, the first British Christian martyr. Work began in 1885 to the design of architect Richard Cunningham Windeyer, Sr. Windeyer's ambitious design was inspired by St. Albans Cathedral in Hertfordshire, England. Even before ground was broken, the Legislative Assembly of Ontario passed a special act designating St. Alban's as the cathedral of the diocese. By November 1889, the crypt, chancel and choir were completed, consecrated and worship services began. In 1891, the synod of the Church of England held its general meeting at the cathedral, the first in Canada.

A financial crisis in 1890, the outbreak of the Second Boer War in 1899 and Windeyer's death in 1900 halted construction.

=== Further construction ===
Work on the cathedral resumed in 1912 under the direction of American architect Ralph Adams Cram. Cram is also known for New York City's unfinished Episcopal cathedral, the Cathedral of St. John the Divine. On August 27, 1912, the cornerstone of the nave was laid by The Duke of Connaught and Strathearn, Governor General of Canada, and his daughter, Princess Patricia of Connaught. Sir Henry Mill Pellatt, of Casa Loma, and Edward Marion Chadwick were major benefactors of the project.

The outbreak of World War I two years later halted work yet again, this time indefinitely. Postwar efforts to complete the cathedral were further hindered by Pellatt's financial collapse in the early 1920s and the onset of the Great Depression in 1929. A further setback came in 1929 when a fire suddenly broke out damaging much of the interior.

In 1936, Derwyn Owen, 5th Bishop of Toronto and Primate of All Canada, formally cancelled all plans to ever complete the cathedral and returned the diocesan seat to St. James's. Thus, the completed chancel of St. Alban's became a parish church. A small brick narthex was constructed in 1956 by Mathers & Haldenby closing in the chancel.

=== School chapel ===
Since 1964, St. Alban's has been the school chapel of Royal St. George's College (RSGC) which is built on the foundation of the cathedral's unfinished nave. The school was founded in 1961 as St. George's College by a group of Anglican clergy and laity, including composer Healey Willan, choirmaster of the Church of St. Mary Magdalene, who had the vision of establishing a permanent home for boys' choral music in Canada. At the suggestion of Frederick Wilkinson, 7th Bishop of Toronto, the newly established college began renting St. Alban's property. The first classes began in 1964 in the See House. Though the arrangement was originally intended to be temporary as the school looked for property in the country, in 1970–72, RSGC built their classrooms, offices and gymnasium in the Brutalist style on the foundation of the unfinished nave.

In 1989, in recognition of the school's 25th anniversary, The Duchess of Kent, on behalf of Queen Elizabeth II, granted the school use of the prefix "Royal". Today it is the only pre-university institution in Canada to bear this distinction.

In 2000, the parish was disestablished and the property was bought by the school and it is now solely their private chapel. Coincidentally, the school is the choir school of the Cathedral Church of St. James which preceded, and eventually once again succeeded, St. Alban's as the cathedral of the diocese.

On September 18, 2010, a fire broke out after a workman left oily rags in the chapel which ignited. While much of the blackened woodwork, plaster and stained glass were able to be repaired, some of the original oak furnishings and a portion of the original floor were lost. The restored chapel reopened in 2011 and was featured as part of Doors Open Toronto in 2012.

== Architecture ==
Richard Cunningham Windeyer, Sr.'s original design was a Norman inspired Gothic Revival cathedral with a cruciform floorplan complete with a 135-foot tower. Only one-third of his design, the chancel, was ever executed. It is of Credit Valley sandstone construction. After Windeyer's death, Ralph Adams Cram was responsible for the cathedral's completion. His design, also in the Gothic Revival style, was less decorated than Windeyer's, removed the front tower and instead planned for a tower over the crossing. Only the foundation of Cram's design for the nave was ever completed.

The interior of the chapel is decorated in plaster and English oak carvings. It is notable for its unique roof, the only double-hammerbeam roof in Canada.

== See House ==
See House is a Queen Anne Revival residence next door to the cathedral. It was completed in 1887 and served as the residence of the Bishop of Toronto until the diocesan seat returned downtown in 1936. From 1898 until 1911, it housed the short-lived St. Alban's Cathedral School. After 1936, it served as the rectory of St. Alban's until 1964 when it became the home of Royal St. George's College.

== See also ==
- List of Anglican churches in Toronto
- List of Anglican cathedrals in Canada
- List of oldest buildings and structures in Toronto
