= Kelly Jazvac =

Canadian artist (born 1980)

- Born: 1980 (age 44–45)
- Education: University of Victoria, University of Guelph
- Known for: Sculptor, Installation artist, Collagist
- Website: kellyjazvac.com

Kelly Jazvac (born 1980) is a Canadian artist whose work has been exhibited nationally and internationally. She is based in Montreal, Quebec, where she is an associate professor at Concordia University.

== Education ==
Kelly Jazvac received her Bachelor of Arts from the University of Guelph in 2003, and her Master of Fine Arts from the University of Victoria in 2006.

== Artistic practice ==
Jazvac works primarily in sculpture, installation, and collage. Her work has often expressed environmental concerns pertaining to pollution, environmental waste, the fetishization of images and products, and the afterlife of human activity and presence. Jazvac describes her own views on sculpture and installation as, "a practice that addresses the way objects and human bodies coexist in the world."

She often works with salvaged vinyl, which she physically transforms to create compressed sculptures. Her practice has been described as having, "ecological overtones, as a salvaging enterprise that might result in a wearable quilt or a habitable shelter." Some have compared Jazvac's textile-like wall hangings to the work of Robert Rauschenberg.

Jazvac is also known for the Plastiglomerates, which were collected from Kamilo Beach, Hawaii. The name was proposed by Jazvac alongside Charles Moore and Patricia Corcoran, and it designates a type of stone that contains mixtures of natural debris melded with hardened molten plastic. The plastiglomerates have been displayed as both sculptural ready-mades and as natural history specimens. It has been suggested that the plastiglomerates may be considered a marker of the Anthropocene.
