= Kenneth Dean (academic) =

Son of David Dean

Kenneth Dean (Chinese: 丁荷生; pinyin: Dīng Héshēng; born 1956) is an American sinologist who is the Raffles Professor in the Humanities at the National University of Singapore and the Kwan Im Thong Hood Cho Temple Professor at Yale-NUS College. Previously, he was the James McGill Professor and Drs. Richard Charles and Esther Yewpick Lee Chair of Chinese Cultural Studies in the Department of East Asian Studies of McGill University.

== Education ==
Dean received his B.A. in Chinese Studies from Brown University and his Ph.D. in Asian Studies from Stanford University.

== Research ==
Dean's research interests include Daoist studies, Chinese popular religion, popular culture and Chinese literature. He is the author of numerous books on Daoism and Chinese popular religion, including Ritual Alliances of the Putian Plains: Vol. 1: Historical Introduction to the Return of the Gods, Vol. 2: A survey of village temples and ritual activities ( with Zheng Zhenman) (Leiden: Brill, 2010); Lord of the Three in One: The spread of a cult in Southeast China (Princeton, 1998), Taoist Ritual and Popular Cults of Southeast China (Princeton 1993); as well as First and Last Emperors: The Absolute State and the Body of the Despot (with Brian Massumi) (Autonomedia, 1992). He also gathered and edited Epigraphical Materials on the History of Religion in Fujian: Xinghua Region (1 vol. 1995); Quanzhou Region (3 vols, 2004) with Professor Zheng Zhenman.

Dean is currently researching on the temples in Singapore, Indonesia, and Malaysia founded by Xinghua (Henghwa) immigrants. He hopes to examine the networks between these temples and communities, and their links back to China.

== Documentary ==
Dean produced an 80-minute documentary film, Bored in Heaven (2010), which highlights the ritual celebrations around Chinese New Years in Putian, Fujian, China. This documentary is based on 20 years of long-term collaboration between Kenneth Dean and Zheng Zhenman. It illustrates the growing intensity of local traditions in Southeast China, as rural villages and their temples transition into a new century. The film builds on the story of the Theater God as told in a ritual performance, by actors, opera singers and puppeteers.

== Selected publications ==
- Kenneth Dean and Zheng Zhenman, Ritual Alliances of the Putian Plains: Vol. 1: Historical Introduction to the Return of the Gods (Leiden: Brill, 2010).
- Kenneth Dean and Zheng Zhenman, Ritual Alliances of the Putian Plains: Vol. 2: A survey of village temples and ritual activities (Leiden: Brill, 2010).
- Kenneth Dean, editor, Stone Inscriptions and Local Historical Research, special issue of Min-su ch’u-i 民俗曲藝 (Studies in Chinese Ritual, Drama and Folklore), Vol. 169. Taipei: Shih Ho Cheng min-su chi-chin-hui.
- Kenneth Dean and Zheng Zhenman, Epigraphical Materials on the History of Religion in Fujian: The Quanzhou region, Vol. 1: Quanzhou and Jinjiang (Fuzhou: Fujian Peoples' Publishing House Press, 2004).
- Kenneth Dean and Zheng Zhenman, Epigraphical Materials on the History of Religion in Fujian: The Quanzhou region, Vol. 2: Nanan, Huian and Yongchun (Fuzhou: Fujian Peoples' Publishing House Press, 2004).
- Kenneth Dean and Zheng Zhenman, Epigraphical Materials on the History of Religion in Fujian: The Quanzhou region, Vol. 3: Xiamen and Tongan (Fuzhou: Fujian Peoples' Publishing House Press, 2004).
- Kenneth Dean, Lord of the Three in One: The spread of a cult in Southeast China (Princeton: Princeton University Press, 1998).
- Kenneth Dean and Zheng Zhenman, Epigraphical Materials on the History of Religion in Fujian: The Xinghua region (Fuzhou: Fujian Peoples' Publishing House Press, 1995).
- Kenneth Dean, Taoist Ritual and Popular Cults of Southeast China (Princeton University Press, 1993).
- Kenneth Dean and Brian Massumi, First and Last Emperors: The Absolute State and the Body of the Despot (New York: Autonomedia, 1992).
