= Barry Valentine =

Canadian bishop

Barry Valentine (26 September 1927 – 16 October 2009) was bishop of the Diocese of Rupert's Land in the Anglican Church of Canada from 1970 to 1982. Valentine's episcopacy was "transformational and visionary."

== Birth and education ==
Valentine was born in Essex, England He was educated at Brentwood School and St John's College, Cambridge. He received an honours degree in history and divinity at St. John's College in 1949. He received a licentiate in theology from the Montreal Diocesan Theological College in 1951, and a bachelor of divinity at McGill University in 1951. He later received a master's degree from St. John's College, in Cambridge, and a doctor of divinity at St John's College in Winnipeg.

== Career as priest ==
Valentine was ordained a priest in the Anglican Diocese of Montreal in 1952. He began his career as a priest as a curate at Christ Church Cathedral, Montreal and then the incumbent at Chateauguay-Beauharnois, Quebec. He was Director of Religious Education for the Diocese of Montreal then Rector of Saint Lambert. Later he became Dean of Montreal serving in that capacity until he was ordained to the episcopate as the ninth Bishop of the Diocese of Rupert's Land in 1970.

An Anglican Bishops' Group Life Laboratory was held 30 July – 10 August 1963, at the Episcopal Theological School, Cambridge, Massachusetts. The Laboratory was jointly sponsored by Anglican Church of Canada and the Protestant Episcopal Church. Valentine served as one of the twelve members of the staff.

== Career as bishop ==
Valentine was consecrated Bishop Coadjutor on 24 June 1969, and became Diocesan Bishop in 1970.

Valentine's episcopacy was Valentine's episcopacy was "transformational and visionary." In his twelve years as bishop, Valentine "transformed" the Diocese of Rupert's Land in the following ways:

- Valentine started Diocesan Festivals that "brought together people from all areas of the diocese for education and fellowship."
- "During his episcopacy, baptised children were admitted to communion."
- Valentine was instrumental in the reactivation of "theological education" at St John's College, Winnipeg.
- He encouraged clergy to engage in lifelong education and developed a sabbatical leave policy to enable them to do so.
- Valentine instituted the Annual Clergy Residential Conference which continues under the name of Clergy and Lay Professionals Residential Conference.
- He was instrumental in establishing the Rupert’s Land Capital Fund to "make grants and loans to the Synod of the Diocese of Rupert's Land and to its parishes or other institutions."
- In 1978, he performed the first ordinations of women in Rupert's Land.
- Valentine met regularly with leaders of other denominations, which led to Anglican-Roman Catholic clergy gatherings.

From 27 February to 3 March 1978, there was a meeting sponsored by the Anglican Consultative Council and the Roman Catholic Secretariat for Promoting Christian Unity. There were five members from each sponsoring group. Bishop Valentine was one of the five from the Anglican Communion and served as co-chairman for the meeting.

Lambeth Conference
Valentine attended the 1978 Lambeth Conference of Anglican bishops in England. While there he played on a cricket team of bishops attending the Conference. Valentine was the big scorer for his winning team. He used a cricket swing he had perfected while he was a student at Cambridge University.

Valentine wrote one of the forty articles written for the bishops who would attend the 1978 Lambeth Conference. His article was on "Women in the Ministry," In his article, Valentine showed that "many of the caring, pastoring, supportive aspects of ministry are basically feminine attitudes." He argued that "a proper affirmation of the femininity of ministry" is essential "to a balanced experience for the church."

Valentine's self-assessment
In his tenth year as bishop, Valentine told the Rupert's Land News that he counted among his most important achievements "the quality of openness in our decision making, in our relationships, in our commitment and in our participation, which is of fundamental importance for our community and for our mission in ministry."

Attitude toward homosexuality
Concerning a homosexual candidate for ordination, Valentine said that he would consider "exactly the same [factors] as if he were heterosexual." In deciding a candidate's suitability for the priesthood, Valentine said that his homosexuality would be of "no significance whatsoever."

Accused in sex scandal
In 1986, a priest in the Diocese of Rupert's Land pleaded guilty to sexual molestation of a 13-year-old boy. The boy's family said that earlier complaints about the priest had been made to Bishop Valentine and that the bishop had done nothing. Valentine, who in 1986 had retired from Rupert's Land, said that he had received "only one" complaint and that he had immediately removed the priest as director of a diocesan summer camp.

== Retirement ==
Bishop Valentine was only 55 in 1982 when he retired. He said that he did so "because I don't think it's a good idea for people to have the same bishop for too many years." He added that while he was in office, he "tried to stir up and share whatever gifts the Lord has given me; now, I truly believe, the time has come for me to offer you the gift of my absence."

In one of his sermons as a retired bishop, Valentine said something that was quoted online in 2015: "I want to be the kind of listener who listens so deeply I risk allowing you to change my mind."

In 1985 Valentine was made an assistant bishop in the Episcopal Diocese of Maryland, where he served until he was abruptly fired by Bishop Theodore Eastman in 1988. Another version of the event says that Valentine "stepped down under difficult circumstances."

In 1997, Valentine served at St. Paul's, K Street, in Washington, D.C. "as interim rector (clergyman in charge)". When the episcopal visit of a female bishop upset the parish, Valentine helped the parish calm down.

Musician
Valentine first played the organ for a service in an Anglican church at the age of thirteen. He was at one time, both organist at McGill University and assistant organist at the Cathedral of the Anglican Diocese of Montreal.

During retirement, Valentine had time to gratify his passion for music. For a time, he served as rector, organist and choir director of the Anglican Parish of Salt Spring Island, B.C.

On Salt Spring Island, Valentine gave an organ recital twice a week. He appeared regularly both as soloist and as accompanist to singers and fellow musicians. He "delighted audiences not only with his playing but also with his lucid and humorous commentaries."

== Death ==
Valentine died Friday, 16 October 2009 on Salt Spring Island, BC. A memorial service was held on Sunday, 25 October 2009 at St. John's Anglican Cathedral in Winnipeg. He was survived by his wife, Carolyn Evans.

A son, John Valentine, played international cricket for the Canadian national side, and took Canada's first wicket in One Day Internationals.

Anglican Communion titles
Preceded by Kenneth Maguire	Dean of Montreal c. 1968–1969	Succeeded by Ron Shepherd
Preceded by Howard Clark	Bishop of Rupert's Land; 1970–1982	Succeeded by Walter H. Jones
