= Faull =

Faull may refer to:

- Brian Faull, Australian television writer and director
- Cecil Faull (1930–2012), Dean of Leighlin, Ireland
- Ellen Faull (1918–2008), operatic soprano
- Greg Faull (born 1969), Australian rules footballer
- Gregory Faull (died 2012), American murder victim
- Jo-Anne Faull (born 1971), tennis player
- John Faull (born 1933), rugby player
- Jonathan Faull (born 1954), official
- Margaret Faull (born 1946), museum director and archaeologist
- Martin Faull (born 1968), cricketer
- Viv Faull (born 1955), Bishop-designate of Bristol, Dean of York, Provost/Dean of Leicester

== See also ==
- Aaron Faulls (born 1975), television personality
- David McFaull (1948–1997), sailor in the 1976 Summer Olympics
