= List of Anglican Bishops of Montreal =

The Bishop of Montreal is an Anglican bishop in the Ecclesiastical Province of Canada. Before the erection of the diocese, its parent Diocese of Quebec had a suffragan bishop of Montreal: George Mountain, 1836–1850. The incumbents have been:

No.	Name	Dates	Notes
1	Francis Fulford	1850–1868	Metropolitan of Canada, 1861–1868
2	Ashton Oxenden	1869–1878	Metropolitan of Canada, 1869–1878
3	William Bond	1879–1906	Metropolitan of Canada, 1901–1906; Primate of All Canada, 1904–1906
4	James Carmichael	1906–1908	
5	John Farthing	1909–1939	
6	Arthur Carlisle	1939–1943	
7	John Dixon	1943–1962	Metropolitan of Canada, 1960–1962
8	Kenneth Maguire	1963–1975	
9	Reginald Hollis	1975–1990	Metropolitan of Canada, 1989–1990
10	Andrew Hutchison	1990–2004	Metropolitan of Canada, 2002–2004; afterwards Primate, 2004–2007
11	Barry Clarke	2004–2015	
12	Mary Irwin-Gibson	2015–2025	
13	Victor-David Mbuyi Bipungu	2025–present	
