= Hugh Farthing =

Canadian politician

Hugh Cragg Farthing KC
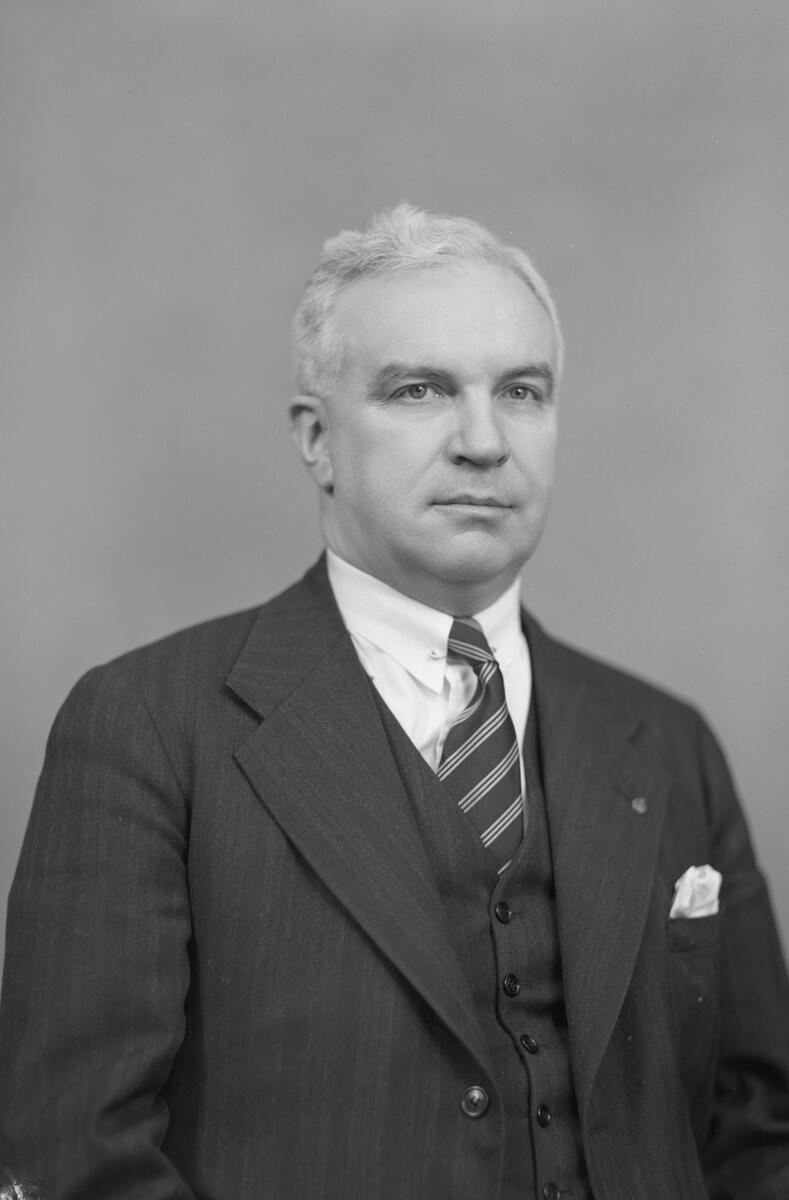
- Portrait of Hugh Farthing in 1940

Member of the Legislative Assembly of Alberta for Calgary
- In office 1930–1935
- Preceded by: Alexander McGillivray; Robert Parkyn
- Succeeded by: Edith Gostick; Ernest Manning; Fred Anderson; John Hugill

Personal details
- Born: July 17, 1892 Woodstock, Ontario, Canada
- Died: June 8, 1968 (aged 75) Calgary, Alberta, Canada
- Party: Conservative
- Parent: John Cragg Farthing (father)
- Relatives: John Colborne Farthing (brother)
- Education: McGill University (BA); Osgoode Hall Law School (LLB)
- Occupation: barrister, judge, politician

Military service
- Allegiance: Canada
- Branch/service: Canadian Expeditionary Force
- Years of service: 1915-1918
- Rank: Lieutenant
- Battles/wars: World War I

Hugh Cragg Farthing KC (July 17, 1892 – June 8, 1968) was a Canadian provincial level politician, lawyer and judge from Alberta. He served as a member of the Legislative Assembly of Alberta from 1930 until 1935 representing the electoral district of Calgary.

== Early life ==
Hugh Cragg Farthing was born July 17, 1892, in Woodstock, Ontario, to Revered John Cragg Farthing the Anglican Bishop of Montreal and Elizabeth Mary Kemp, he had one younger brother John Colborne Farthing. He was educated at Kingston Collegiate Institute and McGill University completing his Bachelor of Arts in 1914, where he was also a member of Kappa Alpha Society, and later Osgoode Hall Law School to complete a Bachelor of Laws in 1919. His education at McGill was interrupted by service in World War I. Farthing was called to the bar in Ontario in 1919 and began to practice in Toronto. He later moved to Calgary and was admitted to the Alberta bar on June 11, 1923.

== Political career ==
Farthing ran for a seat in the Alberta Legislature in the Calgary electoral district for the 1930 Alberta general election. He won his seat on the 7th vote count taking third place overall. He was defeated running for a second term in office in the 1935 Alberta general election.

After his defeat from provincial politics Farthing ran for a seat in the House of Commons of Canada in the 1940 Canadian federal election in the electoral district of Calgary East under the National Government banner. He was defeated finishing a close third, in a race that ended in one of the most dramatic four way splits in Canadian History.

== Judicial career ==
Following his time as an MLA, Farthing was named King's Counsel on January 3, 1935, and partnered to form the firm "Farthing and Tavender". On February 1, 1958, he was appointed a Judge of the District Court of Southern Alberta, and on April 7, 1960, he was appointed to the Trial Division of the Supreme Court of Alberta. Farthing retired on July 18, 1967, and died in Calgary less than a year later on June 8, 1968, at the age of 75.
