= Buxton Smith (priest) =

Dean of Ontario

Buxton Birbick Smith was Dean of Ontario from 1891 to 1906.

Smith was educated at Bishop's University, Lennoxville. Ordained a deacon in 1869 and a priest in 1871 he was a missionary at Onslow, Nova Scotia until 1878. He then served at Marysburg, Shannonville, Ottawa and Sherbrooke before his appointment as Dean.

Religious titles
| Preceded by James Lyster | Dean of Ontario; 1892–1906 | Succeeded by John Cragg Farthing |
