= Dean of Ontario =

Anglican dean

The Dean of Ontario is an Anglican dean in the Anglican Diocese of Ontario of the Ecclesiastical Province of Ontario, based at St George's Cathedral, Kingston. The incumbent is also Rector of St George's. The incumbents have been :

Tenure	Incumbent	Notes	Ref
1862–1862	George Okill Stuart	(1776–1862) 1st Dean of Ontario, position created in 1862	
1862–1864	William Lauder	(?–1868) Dean of Leighlin, 1864-68	
1864–1885	James Lyster	(1810–1891) Dean of Leighlin, 1854–64	
?–1906	Buxton Smith	(?–1906)	
1907–1909	John Cragg Farthing	(1861–1947) Anglican Bishop of Montreal, 1909–39	
1909–1917	Edward Bidwell	(1866–1941) Bishop of Ontario, 1917–26	
1917–1925	George Lothrop Starr	(1872-1925)	
1926–1943	William Craig	(1873–1957)	
1943–1945	Reginald Seeley	(1908–1957)	
1945–1964	Briarly Browne		
1964–1976	Richard Fleming		
1977–1991	Grahame Baker		
1991–1993	Michael Bedford-Jones	Suffragan Bishop of Toronto, 1993	
1995–2000	A. V. "Terry" Bennett		
2000–2002	George Bruce	(1942–) Bishop of Ontario, 2002	
?–?	Alex Hewitt		
2009–2015	Mary Irwin-Gibson	Bishop of Montreal, 2015	
2016–2021	Donald Angus Davidson		
2022–present	Douglas Michael		
