= Arthur Carlisle =

Canadian Anglican bishop

The Right Reverend Arthur Carlisle
- Bishop of Montreal
- Church: Anglican Church of Canada
- See: Montreal
- In office: 1939—1943
- Predecessor: John Farthing (bishop)
- Successor: John Dixon (bishop)

Orders
- Ordination: 1904
- Consecration: 25 April 1939 by D.T. Owen

Personal details
- Born: 29 November 1881 Portsmouth
- Died: 5 January 1943 Montreal

Arthur Carlisle (29 November 1881 – 5 January 1943) was the 6th Anglican Bishop of Montreal from 1939 to 1943.

== Early life and education ==
Carlisle was born in Portsmouth on 29 November 1881, and emigrated to London, Ontario with his parents where he was educated at the Collegiate Institute and Huron University College at Western Ontario University before studying for ordination and embarking on a curacy at Memorial Church in his adopted home city. From there he was successively Rector of Holy Trinity Church, Lucan and All Saints Church Windsor before wartime service as Chaplain with the 18th Battalion of the Canadian Expeditionary Force, during which time he held the rank of Captain.

== Career ==
When hostilities ceased he returned again to London to become Canon of St. Paul's Cathedral . From there he moved in 1921 to Montreal where he was to spend the rest of his ecclesiastical career. The large part of this was as Dean of Montreal at the Cathedral Church and at the outbreak of the Second World War (1939) elevation to that See's Bishopric. He died four years later on January 5, 1943, "one of the most distinguished and highly respected clergymen in Canada".

== See also ==
- List of Anglican Bishops of Montreal
- https://18thbattalioncef.wordpress.com/soldiers-listed-in-diary/carlisle-arthur-chaplain-18th-battalion/

Religious titles
Preceded by John Cragg Farthing	Bishop of Montreal; 1939–1943	Succeeded by John Harkness Dixon
Preceded by Lennox Waldron Williams	Dean of Montreal; 1922–1939	Succeeded by John Harkness Dixon
