= Francis Watson =

Francis Watson may refer to:

- Francis Watson (art historian) (1907–1992), British art historian
- Francis Watson (cricketer) (1860–1930), New Zealand cricketer and schoolteacher
- Francis Watson (footballer) (born 1995), Australian rules footballer
- Francis Watson (politician) (1864–1947), British politician
- Francis Watson (priest) (died 1876), Dean of Leighlin
- Francis Watson (theologian) (born 1956), English theologian
- Francis Harold Watson (1854–1905), Southern African traveller, hunter and trader
- Buzz Watson (Francis Watson), fictional television character

== See also ==
- Frank Watson (disambiguation)
