= Dean of Montreal =

The Dean of Montreal is an Anglican dean in the Anglican Diocese of Montreal of the Ecclesiastical Province of Canada, based at Christ Church Anglican Cathedral in Montreal.

The incumbents have been (incomplete list):

Tenure	Incumbent	Notes	Ref
1854–1872	John Bethune	(1791–1872), 1st Dean of Montreal	
1872–1878	William Bond	(1815–1906), afterwards Bishop of Montreal, 1878	
1879–1883	Maurice Baldwin	(1836–1904), afterwards Bishop of Huron, 1883	
1883–1902	James Carmichael	(1838–1908), afterwards Bishop of Montreal, 1906	
1902–1920	Thomas Evans	previously Archdeacon of Montreal from 1886 to 1902	
1922–1939	Arthur Carlisle	(1881–1943), afterwards Bishop of Montreal, 1939	
1940–1943	John Dixon	(1888–1972), afterwards Bishop of Montreal, 1943	
1944–1952	Kenneth Evans	(1903–1970), afterwards Bishop of Ontario, 1952	
1953–1960	Hasted Dowker	(1900–1986) afterwards he was Archdeacon of Bow Valley from 1960 to 1966	
1960–1962	Kenneth Maguire	(1923–2000), afterwards Bishop of Montreal,1963	
1962-1968	William C. Bothwell	(1923-2015)	
1968–?1969	Barry Valentine	(1927–2009), afterwards Bishop of Rupert's Land,1970	
1969–1985	Ron Shepherd	(1926–2012), afterwards Bishop of British Columbia, 1985	
1986-1990	Andrew Hutchison	(1938- ), afterwards Bishop of Montreal, 1990 then Primate of Canada, 2004	
1991–2011	Michael Pitts	(1944-2025)	
2011–2016	Paul Kennington		
2018–	Bertrand Olivier		
