= Martin Gordon (bishop) =

British-born Anglican bishop in the Congo

The Right Reverend Martin Gordon
- Bishop of Goma
- Church: Province of the Anglican Church of the Congo; Church of England
- See: Goma
- In office: 2023–present
- Predecessor: Désiré Mukanirwa Kadhoro

Orders
- Ordination: 4 July 2010 (diaconate)
- Consecration: 23 April 2023 by Georges Titre Ande

Personal details
- Spouse: Anthea Gordon

Martin Lewis Gordon is a British-born Anglican bishop. Since 2023, he has been the second bishop of the Diocese of Goma in the Province of the Anglican Church of the Congo.

== Education and early career ==
Gordon is a graduate of the University of Edinburgh. He began his career in politics, working for the British Parliament, and then as international campaigns manager at Christian Aid, where he helped coordinate the Make Poverty History coalition.

Gordon was ordained to the diaconate at Bristol Cathedral at Petertide 2010. His curacy was at St. Michael's, Stoke Gifford. In 2014, he became priest in charge of St. Thomas with St. Stephen, Telford Park, in the Diocese of Southwark.

== Episcopacy ==
In 2020, at the invitation of Bishop Désiré Mukanirwa Kadhoro, Gordon and his family relocated to Goma in the Democratic Republic of the Congo to support theological education in the diocese through the Church Mission Society. Mukanirwa died from COVID-19 before Gordon could arrive in the Congo. He was asked by then-primate Zacharie Masimango Katanda to serve as vicar general until the election of the next bishop. Gordon was eventually chosen to serve as a missionary bishop for the diocese, and he was consecrated and installed as the second bishop of Goma on 23 April 2023.

Gordon's episcopacy has been dominated by the outbreak of violence by the Rwanda-backed M23 rebel group in North Kivu. Despite the violence, the diocese has continued to grow. On 25 January 2025, as M23 approached the outskirts of Goma and at the recommendation of the British government, Gordon and his family evacuated to neighboring Gisenyi, Rwanda. In response to the continued warfare and reported incursion of Rwandan Defence Force troops into Goma, Gordon issued a call for peace in the region on behalf of the diocese, seeking: an immediate ceasefire; protection of civilians and humanitarian aid; the withdrawal of M23 and RDF forces from DRC territory; the resumption of dialogue between Kigali and Kinshasa; and international coordination to bring a resolution to the conflict.

"There have been many fine-sounding statements from the U.N. from the European community. What we need now is action," Gordon said to NPR. "The only solution, as everyone is saying, is a negotiated solution. So the international community needs to do everything it can to get people around the table and to use its economic and its diplomatic muscle and its financial muscle to enable peace in the region because this could spill into a regional conflict. And all the Congolese people really want is peace and a chance to go about their daily lives."

== Personal life ==
Gordon has been married to Anthea since 2008, and they have three children.

Anglican Communion titles
Preceded by Désiré Mukanirwa Kadhoro	Anglican Bishop of Goma; Since 2023	Incumbent
