= Thomas Evans (Dean of Montreal) =

Thomas Frye Lewis Evans (1845–1920) was a Canadian Anglican priest.

Evans was born in Simcoe, Ontario; and educated at Upper Canada College and Trinity College, Toronto. He was ordained deacon in 1869; and priest in 1870. He was a missionary at Norwich, Ontario from 1869 to 1871; then Curate at Christ Church Cathedral, Montreal from 1871 to 1874. He was Rector of St Stephen, Lachine from 1874 until 1902; and Archdeacon of Montreal from 1886 to 1902. He was Dean of Montreal from 1902 to 1920.
