= Ashton Oxenden =

- Bishop of Montreal
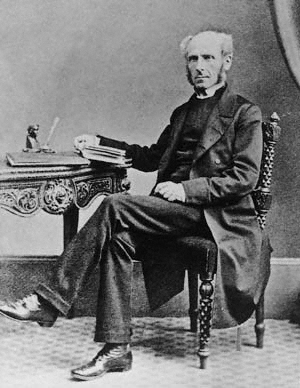
- Church: Anglican Church of Canada
- See: Montreal
- In office: 1869–1878
- Predecessor: Francis Fulford
- Successor: William Bennett Bond
- Previous post: rector

Orders
- Ordination: 1833

Personal details
- Born: 20 September 1808 Canterbury, Kent
- Died: 22 February 1892 (aged 83) Biarritz, France
- Parents: Sir Henry Oxenden, 7th Baronet; Mary Graham

Ashton Oxenden (20 September 1808 – 22 February 1892) was Bishop of Montreal.

== Early life ==
Born 20 September 1808, at Broome Park, Kent, he was the fifth son of Sir Henry Oxenden (1756–1838), 7th Baronet Oxenden, of Broome Park; Commissioner of Dover Harbour. His mother, Mary Graham, was the daughter of Colonel John Graham (1723–1789), of St. Lawrence House, near Canterbury; former Lieutenant governor of Georgia.

Educated at Ramsgate and at Harrow School, Oxenden matriculated at University College, Oxford, on 9 June 1826; graduated B.A. 1831, M.A. 1859, and was created D.D. 10 July 1869. In December 1833, he was ordained to the curacy of Barham, Kent, where he introduced weekly cottage lectures. In 1838, he resigned his charge, and during the following seven years was incapacitated for work by continuous ill-health. From 1849 to 1869 he was rector of Pluckley with Pevington, Kent, and in 1864 was made an honorary canon of Canterbury Cathedral. At Pluckley he first commenced extemporaneous preaching, and wrote the Barham Tracts.

In 1864, Oxenden married, on 14 June, Sarah (born 1828), daughter of Joseph Hoare Bradshaw (1784–1845), a London banker and a grandson of Samuel Hoare. The couple had a daughter, Mary Ashton Oxenden, who married in 1891 Charles John Wood (1862–1902), the youngest son of Lt.-General Thomas Wood (1804–1872), of Gwernyfed Park, Breconshire, MP for Middlesex.

== Bishop of Montreal ==
In May 1869, he was elected bishop of Montreal and metropolitan of Canada by the Canadian provincial synod. He was consecrated in Westminster Abbey on 1 August, and installed in Christ Church Cathedral, Montreal on 5 September. Three-fourths of the population of the city were Roman Catholics, but the Church of England possessed twelve churches there besides the cathedral. Oxenden presided over nine dioceses. He assiduously attended to his episcopal duties, generally living within Montreal's Golden Square Mile during the winter, and visiting the country districts in the summer. Ill-health caused his resignation of the bishopric in 1878, and on his return to England he attended the Pan-Anglican synod. From 30 May 1879 to 1884 he was vicar of St. Stephen's, near Canterbury, and from 1879 to 1884 he officiated as rural dean of Canterbury. He died at Biarritz, France, on 22 February 1892.

== Works ==
The bishop wrote numerous small theological works, which the author's plain and simple language rendered very popular. The Pathway of Safety, 1856, was much appreciated by the poorer classes, and ultimately reached a circulation of three hundred and fifty thousand copies. The Christian Life, 1877, went to forty-seven thousand, and the Barham Tracts Nos. 1 to 49, after running to many editions in their original form, were collected and published as Cottage Readings in 1859. With Charles Henry Ramsden, he wrote in 1858 Family Prayers for Eight Weeks, which was often reprinted.

Oxenden's name is attached to upwards of forty-five distinct works. Besides those already mentioned, the most important were:

1. The Cottage Library, 1846–51, 6 vols.
2. Confirmation; or, Are you ready to serve Christ?, 1847; tenth thousand, 1859.
3. Cottage Sermons, 1853.
4. Family Prayers, 1858; 3rd ed. 1860.
5. The Fourfold Picture of the Sinner, 1858.
6. Fervent Prayer, 1860; fifth thousand, 1861.
7. God's Message to the Poor: Eleven Sermons in Pluckley Church, 3rd ed. 1861.
8. The Home beyond; or, Happy Old Age, 1861; ten thousand copies.
9. Sermons on the Christian Life, 1861.
10. Words of Peace, 1863.
11. The Parables of our Lord explained, 1864.
12. A Plain History of the Christian Church, 1864.
13. Our Church and her Services, 1866.
14. Decision, 1868.
15. Short Lectures on the Sunday Gospels, 1869.
16. My First Year in Canada, 1871.
17. A Simple Exposition of the Psalms, 1872.
18. Counsels to the Confirmed, 1878; ten thousand copies.
19. Short Comments on the Gospels, 1885.
20. Touchstones; or, Christian Graces and Characters tested, 1884.
21. Portraits from the Bible: Old Testament Saints, 1880.
22. Portraits from the Bible: New Testament Saints, 1884.

== See also ==
- Anglican Diocese of Montreal
- List of Anglican Bishops of Montreal

Anglican Communion titles
| Preceded by Francis Fulford | Bishop of Montreal; 1869–1878 | Succeeded by William Bennett Bond |
