= Bishop of Montreal =

Bishop of Montreal may refer to:

- the Anglican Bishop of the Diocese of Montreal
- the Roman Catholic Archbishop of the Archdiocese of Montreal
