= Stewart Blacker (priest) =

Irish Anglican priest

Stewart Blacker (1740–1826) was an Anglican priest in Ireland in the late 18th and early 19th centuries.

Blacker was educated at Trinity College, Dublin. he was Archdeacon of Dromore from 1777 until 1810; and Dean of Leighlin from 1778 to 1804.

He died on 1 December 1826.
