= Diocese of Montreal =

Diocese of Montreal can refer to:

- Roman Catholic Archdiocese of Montreal
- Anglican Diocese of Montreal
