= Francis Fulford (bishop) =

19th-century Anglican Bishop of Montreal

- Bishop of Montreal
- Fulford photographed in 1861
- Church: Anglican Church of Canada
- See: Montreal
- In office: 1850–1868
- Predecessor: none
- Successor: Ashton Oxenden

Orders
- Consecration: 25 July 1850

Personal details
- Born: 3 June 1803 Sidmouth
- Died: 9 September 1868 (aged 65) Montreal

Francis Fulford (3 June 1803 – 9 September 1868) was an Anglican Bishop of Montreal.

== Origins ==
He was born at Sidmouth in Devon on 3 June 1803, and was baptised at Dunsford, Devon, 14 October 1804. He was the second son of Col. Baldwin Fulford (1775–1847) of Great Fulford in the parish of Dunsford, Devonshire, lord of the manor of Dunsford and an officer in the Inniskillen Dragoons and Lieutenant-Colonel of the Devon Militia, by his wife Anna Maria Adams, eldest daughter of William Adams (1752–1811), MP for Totnes, of Bowden House, Ashprington, near Totnes. The Fulford family is one of the most ancient in Devonshire and in England, and has been resident at Great Fulford since the 12th century.

== Early life ==
He was educated at Blundell's School in Devon and matriculated at Exeter College, Oxford on 1 February 1821. He was elected a fellow of his college 30 June 1824, but vacated his fellowship 18 October 1830 following his marriage. Fulford proceeded B.A. in 1827, and M.A. 1838, and was created an honorary D.D. 6 July 1850.

He was ordained a deacon in 1826, and became curate of Holne, Devonshire, afterwards removing to the curacy of Fawley. The Duke of Rutland instituted him to the rectory of Trowbridge, Wiltshire, in 1832, where he lived for ten years, and as a justice of the peace as well as a clergyman commanded respect and conciliated goodwill. In 1842 he accepted the rectory of Croydon, Cambridgeshire, which he held until 1845, when he was nominated by Earl Howe as minister of the Curzon Chapel in Mayfair, London.

== Life as a missionary ==
On the projection of the Colonial Church Chronicle and Missionary Journal in 1848 he was chosen editor, and in this way acquired a knowledge of the condition of the colonial church. On 19 July 1850 he was gazetted the first bishop of the new Diocese of Montreal, Canada, and consecrated in Westminster Abbey on 25 July. He landed at St. John's on 12 September and was enthroned in Christ Church Cathedral, Montreal, on 15 September. In the following month he was actively at work, and the church society of the Diocese of Montreal was organised. On 20 January 1852 the primary visitation was held, when he won great respect from all parties by his declaration that the church of England in Canada, politically considered, "exists but as one of many religious bodies." Montreal was next mapped out into ecclesiastical boundaries, and each district thus divided was set apart as the conventional parish of the neighbouring church. The bishop cheerfully co-operated with all the societies that were established for benevolent, scientific, and philanthropic purposes, and wrote papers for, and delivered lectures at, mechanics' institutes and working men's clubs. On 21 May 1857 he laid the foundation-stone of his new cathedral, where on Advent Sunday, 1859, he preached the opening sermon. Unfortunately the great cost of this building involved the diocese in a heavy debt, the thought of which so preyed on the bishop's mind that he practised the utmost economy throughout the remaining years of his life in an endeavour to pay off the amount.

== Final years and legacy ==
On 9 July 1860 the queen caused letters patent to be issued promoting Fulford to the office of metropolitan of Canada and elevating the see of Montreal to the dignity of a metropolitical see, with the city of Montreal as the seat of that see, and on 10 September in the following year the first provincial synod of the united church of England and Ireland in Canada was held at Montreal. It was chiefly on the representation of the synod of Canada that the Archbishop of Canterbury held the Pan-Anglican synod at Lambeth 24–27 Sep 1867, on which occasion the Bishop of Montreal visited England and took part in the proceedings. He, however, seems on this journey to have overtaxed his strength, and never afterwards had good health.

In 1865, he preached at the General Convention of the U.S. Episcopal Church in Philadelphia, and 1,500 copies of his address were printed.

== Marriage and children ==
In 1830 he married Mary Drummond, eldest daughter of Andrew Berkeley Drummond of Cadlands, Hampshire (a grandson of William Drummond, 4th Viscount Strathallan (died 1746)) by his wife Mary Perceval a daughter of John Perceval, 2nd Earl of Egmont (1711–1770). By Mary Drummond he had children including his eldest son, Francis Drummond Fulford (1831–1907), who in 1871 on the death of his childless uncle Col. Baldwin Fulford (1801–1871), inherited Great Fulford and other estates in Devon, and was the great-grandfather of the present head of the family, Francis Fulford (born 1952), of Great Fulford.

== Death and burial ==
He died in the see-house, Montreal, 9 September 1868, and was buried on 12 September, when the universal respect which his moderation had won for him was shown by the bell of the Roman Catholic Church being tolled as the funeral procession passed. His inscribed stone memorial tablet exists on the north wall of the chancel of Dunsford Church in Devon.

== Publications ==
1. ‘A Sermon at the Visitation of Venerable L. Clarke, Archdeacon of Sarum,’ 1833.
2. ‘A Course of Plain Sermons on the Ministry, Doctrine, and Services of the Church of England,’ 2 vols. 1837–40.
3. ‘The Interpretation of Law and the Rule of Faith,’ an assize sermon, 1838.
4. ‘The Progress of the Reformation in England,’ 1841.
5. ‘A Pastoral Letter to the Clergy of the Diocese,’ 1851.
6. ‘An Address delivered in the Chapel of the General Theological Seminary of the Protestant Episcopal Church in the United States,’ 1852.
7. ‘A Charge delivered to the Clergy of the Diocese of Montreal,’ 1852.
8. ‘The Sermon at the Consecration of H. Potter to the Episcopate,’ 1854.
9. ‘Five Occasional Lectures delivered in Montreal,’ 1859.
10. ‘Sermons, Addresses, and Statistics of the Diocese of Montreal,’ 1865. Fulford's latest publication was ‘A Pan-Anglican Synod: a Sermon,’ 1867.

== See also ==
- Anglican Diocese of Montreal
- List of Anglican Bishops of Montreal

Anglican Communion titles
New title	Bishop of Montreal; 1850–1868	Succeeded by Ashton Oxenden
