= John Dixon (bishop) =

Canadian Anglican bishop

John Harkness Dixon (23 July 1888 – 1 April 1972) was the 7th Anglican Bishop of Montreal from 1943 to 1960 and then Metropolitan of the Ecclesiastical Province of Canada (and thus Archbishop of Montreal) for a further two years.

Born in Iroquois, Ontario he was educated at the University of Toronto before embarking on an ecclesiastical career with a curacy at Fenaghvale, Ontario. This was swiftly followed by elevation to posts in Ottawa, during which time he was appointed a Canon of the cathedral . After a further 8 years in the Diocese of Toronto he was appointed Dean of Montreal in 1940 before being made bishop in 1943.

== See also ==
- List of Anglican Bishops of Montreal

Religious titles
Preceded by Arthur Carlisle	Bishop of Montreal; 1943–1962	Succeeded by Robert Kenneth Maguire
Preceded by Philip Carrington	Metropolitan of Canada; 1960–1962	Succeeded by Henry O'Neil
