= St Jax Montréal =

Coordinates: 45°29′47″N 73°34′35″W

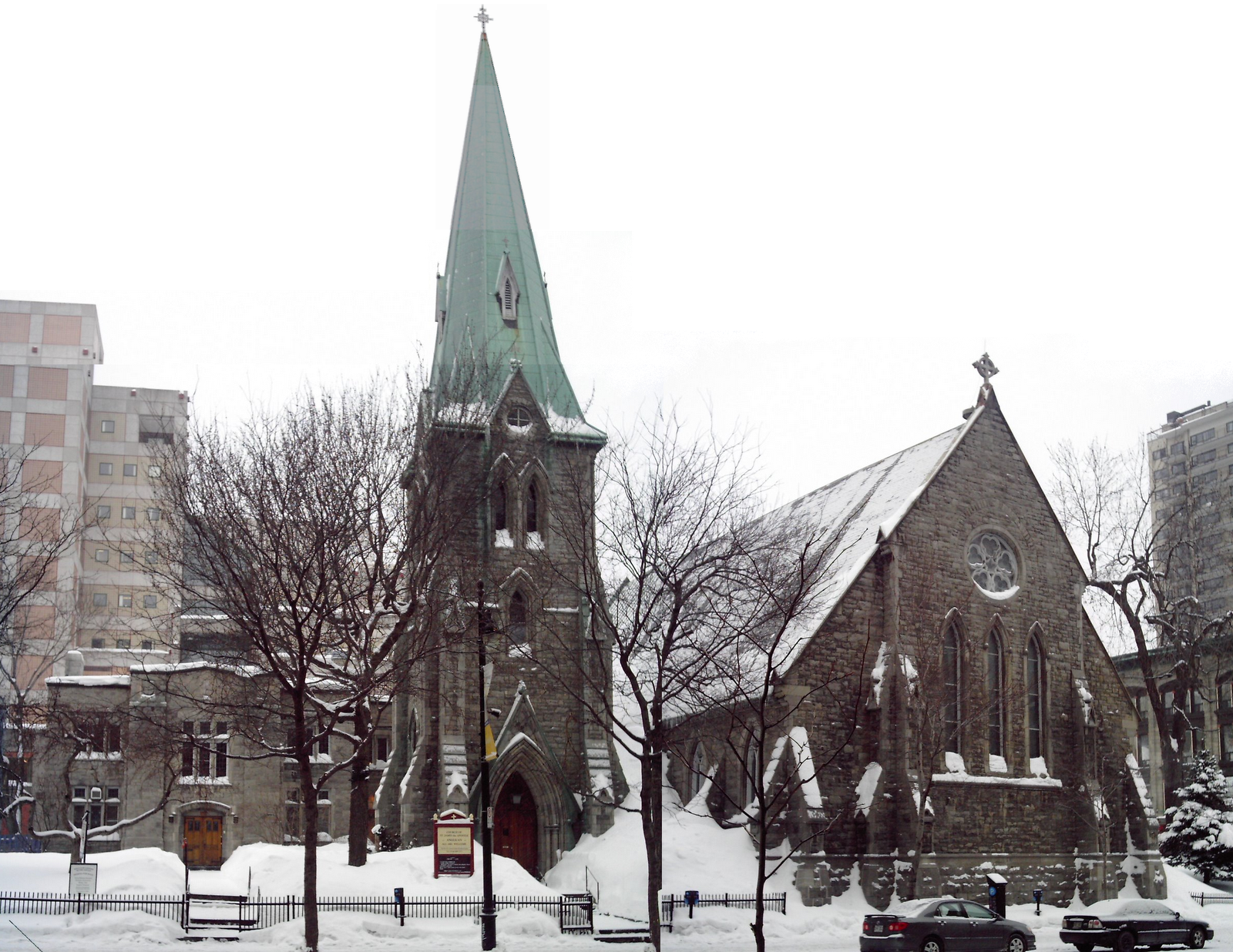
- St Jax Montréal on rue Sainte-Catherine
- St Jax Montréal
- Location: 1439, rue Sainte-Catherine Ouest; Montreal, Quebec; H3G 1S6
- Denomination: Anglican Church of Canada
- Churchmanship: Charismatic evangelical Anglicanism
- Website: www.stjax.org

History
- Former name: St. James the Apostle Anglican Church
- Status: active
- Founded: 1864

Architecture
- Heritage designation: Grade B
- Architect: Lawford and Nelson
- Architectural type: Gothic Revival
- Groundbreaking: 1864

Specifications
- Capacity: 750

Administration
- Province: Canada
- Diocese: Montreal
- Archdeaconry: Montreal
- Deanery: Hochelaga

Clergy
- Bishop: Victor-David Mbuyi Bipungu
- Rector: Neil Mancor

St Jax Montréal is an Anglican church located in Montreal, Quebec, Canada. Its address is at 1439 Sainte-Catherine Street West.

== History ==
St Jax Montréal was first opened for worship in May 1864 under its formal and historic (and ongoing) name of St. James the Apostle Anglican Church. St Jax is a Gothic Revival church built of grey limestone. Originally, it stood on open land and was given the nickname of St. Crickets in the Fields. This name arose when a British army regiment was garrisoned in Montreal at the time, owing to the American Civil War, and the officers took to playing cricket beside the newly built church.

Since its original construction, the church has been altered, expanded, restored and even partly demolished over the years. A rectory was built next door in 1868 but demolished in its entirety in 1937. A small chapel was added in 1896, but owing to shifting foundations it was torn down and rebuilt in 1956. The Parish Hall was built behind the rectory in 1924. The nave was lengthened towards Sainte-Catherine street in 1877; the north transept was built in 1895. Although Canon Ellegood was the first rector of St. James the Apostle for the period of 1864 to 1911, the major window over the Altar, an Ascension window, dedicated to the Glory of God is in memory of the late Canon Allan P. Shatford, the second Rector of St. James the Apostle (1911-1935).

=== Closure and rebranding ===
In the Fall of 2015, it was announced that the parish of St. James the Apostle would be dissolved at the end of the civil year, with a new church plant supported by Holy Trinity Brompton to be installed on site in 2016.

It is now considered a mission parish, under the by laws of the Diocese of Montreal and presently supported entirely by the Anglican Diocese of Montreal.

=== Victoria Rifles of Canada ===
St. James the Apostle had strong ties with the Victoria Rifles of Canada, and the close association continued until the regiment disbanded in November 1995. The colours were retired and now hang in the church. The tablets are to the glory of God and in memory of the many members of the congregation who were in the armed forces during the two great wars.

== Architecture ==
=== Church garden ===
The church garden is open to the public daily during office hours and has been recently renovated by volunteers from Innovation Jeunes. There are thirty-one stained glass windows in the church, chapel and entrances, four of which significant.

=== Interior ===
Of the three large panel windows on the St. Catherine street wall, the center panel depicts St. James, in memory of Charles Watson Phillips who died in 1853. The panel on the left represents the Centurion and was erected by the congregation in memory of Charles's brother who died in 1872. The panel on the right has the figure of Christ as he appears to Mary and is in memory of Charles's widow, Dame Ann Bain, who died in 1891. The Phillips family donated the land for the church.

At the back of the west transept is a three paneled window. The centre panel is Jesus Christ standing in an arresting position as Saviour of the World, and is in memory of the Prince Consort. It was given by the congregation. The panel to the left represents Christ blessing the little children and is in memory of the Judah family who were generous members of the church at the turn of the century. On the right is the standing figure of Christ in memory of Robert Foster, who died in 1899 and his wife Margaret Haldane who died in 1904.

In the east transept, a third window was donated by the congregation in memory of those who fought and fell in the First World War. This window is referred to as the Regimental Window and the various armed services are represented in it.

There used to be a rood screen to separate the nave from the choir, but it was eventually removed to provide ceiling decorations towards the top of the centre aisle. There is a decorative frieze around the nave at ceiling level which contains the full Apostles' Creed. The front arch holds two carved angels keeping watch over the community.

=== Cross of nails ===
St. James the Apostle was presented with a Cross of Nails from the Coventry Cathedral in Coventry, England following its destruction by the German Luftwaffe during the Coventry Blitz of 1940. The cross now hangs on the office wall "bringing the Church of St. James the Apostle into close fellowship with Coventry Cathedral in the search for relevance of the Christian faith to the international needs of the Christian world."
