= William Bond (bishop) =

Canadian priest and archbishop

The Rt. Rev. William Bennett Bond
- Bishop of Montreal
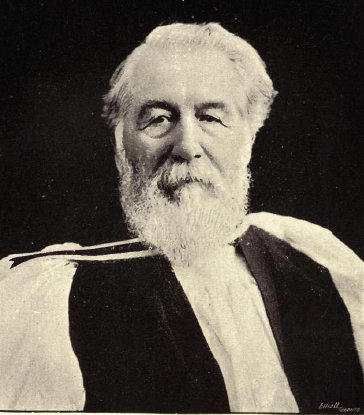
- Church: Anglican Church of Canada
- Installed: 1879
- Term ended: 1906
- Predecessor: Ashton Oxenden
- Successor: James Carmichael

Personal details
- Born: 10 September 1815 Truro, England
- Died: 9 October 1906 (aged 91) Montreal, Quebec, Canada

William Bennett Bond (10 September 1815 – 9 October 1906) was a Canadian priest, archbishop, and the 2nd primate of the Anglican Church of Canada.

== Early life ==
Bond was born on September 10, 1815, at Truro, England, to John Bond and Nanny Bennett. William was educated at Calday Grange Grammar School and later somewhere in London. At age 17, Bond left England to work in business at St. John's, Newfoundland. There, he met Mark Willoughby, a superintendent of the Newfoundland School Society, and joined his bible class. Under the direction of the Reverend Thomas Finch Hobday Bridge, Bond began to read for ordination. In 1839, Bond moved to Lower Canada, and the next year was ordained deacon by the Bishop of Quebec, George Jehoshaphat Mountain. His first post as deacon was as a mission to the Quebec countryside, purportedly founding eleven schools in the township of Hemmingford. In 1841, Bond was ordained priest in Montreal. In 1842, Bond was appointed incumbent of a church in Lachine, and held at least four services a week, three on a Sunday.

== Montreal ==
In 1848, Bond travelled to Montreal, where he served as assistant minister at St. George's. The same year, he replaced Willoughby as a superintendent of the Newfoundland School Society. Bond quickly rose in prominence within the Anglican church, becoming rector of his church in 1863 and rural dean of Hochelaga the same year. In 1866, he became canon of Christ Church Cathedral, Montreal, and four years later the domestic chaplain to Ashton Oxenden, the Bishop of Montreal and Archdeacon of Hochelaga. In 1872 he was appointed Dean of Montreal, a position he held until his consecration as bishop.

Bond's most significant contribution to the Anglican church in Montreal was his work with youth. His church, St. George's, played host to the largest Sunday school in the city. Bond's founding of the St. George's YMCA led to the creation of at least six new Montreal parishes. In 1878, the Diocese of Montreal elected Bond as their third bishop, consecrated on January 25 the following year. He immediately set about reorganizing the financial affairs of the diocese, which had been weakened by an economic downturn during the 1870s.

== Later years ==
By 1900, Bond's health was clearly declining, and in 1902, his coadjutor James Carmichael had to take over many of his duties. In spite of this, Bond was elected Primate of the Anglican Church of Canada in 1904. His death on October 9, 1906, cut short his primacy, causing him to be one of the shortest-serving primates of Canada.

== See also ==
- List of Anglican Bishops of Montreal

Anglican Communion titles
Preceded by Ashton Oxenden	Bishop of Montreal; 1879–1906	Succeeded by James Carmichael
Preceded by Robert Machray	Primate of the Anglican Church of Canada; 1904-1906	Succeeded by Arthur Sweatman
