= Tom Gordon (priest) =

Thomas William Gordon (born 1957) is the current dean of Leighlin.

He was born in Portadown, educated at the University of Ulster and ordained deacon in 1989 and priest in 1980. He began his ecclesiastical career as a minor canon at St Anne's Cathedral, Belfast. He was the priest vicar at Christ Church Cathedral, Dublin from 1996 to 2010, when he moved to Old Leighlin.

In 2011, Gordon became the first cleric of the Church of Ireland to enter into a same-sex civil partnership, and this was welcomed by his community.

Church of Ireland titles
Preceded by Frederick John Gordon Wynne	Dean of Leighlin; 2010–	Succeeded by Current incumbent
