= John Finlay (Dean of Leighlin) =

John Finlay (27 June 1842 – 12 June 1921) was Dean of Leighlin from 1895 until 1912.

Finlay was educated at Trinity College, Dublin and ordained in 1867. He began his ecclesiastical career as a curate in Clonenagh. He was the incumbent at Lorum from 1873 to 1890 when he moved to Carlow. Upon his retirement he moved to Brackley House near Bawnboy, Co. Cavan.

He was murdered by the IRA on 12 June 1921 for apparently objecting to his home being burned, to deny it being used to shelter security forces. Eleven members of the IRAs Cavan Brigade were arrested in connection with Finlays murder.

There is a memorial to him at St Peter, Templeport.
