= Henri Isingoma =

The Most Reverend Henri Isingoma
- Emeritus Primate of the Congo, Bishop Emeritus of Kinshasa
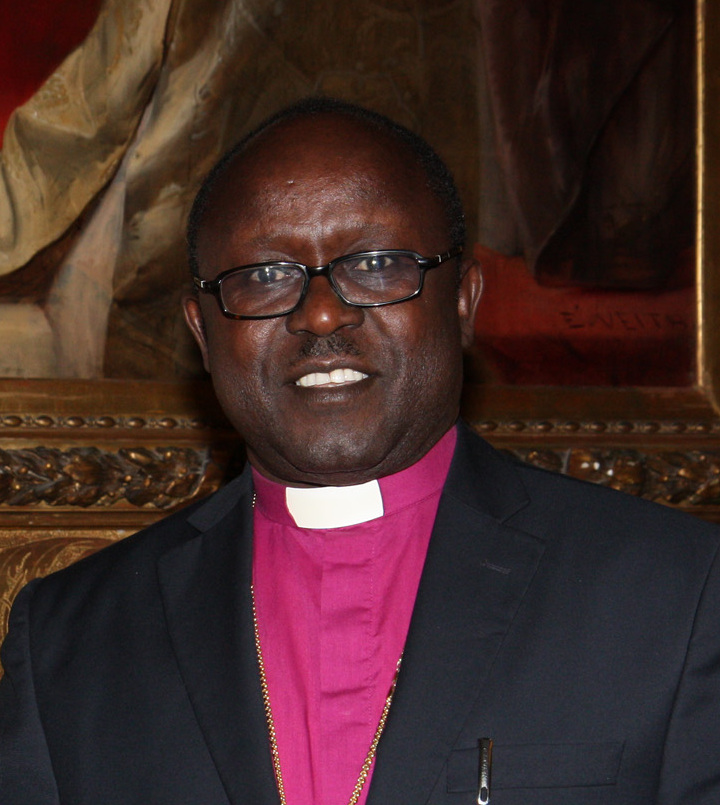
- Church: Province of the Anglican Church of the Congo
- See: Kinshasa
- In office: August 2009-September 2016
- Predecessor: Fidèle Dirokpa
- Successor: Zacharie Masimango Katanda
- Previous post: Bishop of Boga

Orders
- Consecration: 1997 by Patrice Njojo

Personal details
- Born: November 24, 1958 (age 67) Belgian Congo

Henri Isingoma Kahwa (Note: Due to confusion over Congolese naming customs, Western outlets may not order his names consistently. According to official Anglican Church of the Congo sources, Isingoma is the surname.) (born November 24, 1958) is a Democratic Republic of the Congo Anglican bishop. He was the third Primate and Archbishop of the Anglican Church of the Congo since his consecration in August 2009 until March 2016, when he resigned. Isingoma is married to Mugisha and the couple has 6 adult children.

== Ecclesiastical career ==
He studied at the Boga Institute and at the Nyankunde Institute, where he graduated in 1977. He took a degree in Theology and Human Sciences at the Superior Institute of Anglican Theology, in 1984. He also holds a master's degree in Theology at the Evangelical Theology Faculty of Bangui, Central African Republic, in 1997.

He served first as Bishop of Katanga, from 1997 to 2007, being elected Bishop of Boga in 2007, a position that he held until 2009. He was elected third Primate and Archbishop of the Anglican Church of Congo in a Bishops retreat held in Goma at 28 April 2009. He received four out of seven votes. He also serves as Bishop of Kinshasa.

Isingoma is considered a moderate conservative. He is critical of the Episcopal Church of the United States departure of orthodox Anglicanism but at the same time he is also supportive of those orthodoxes still remaining in the church. He is a supporter of the Global South (Anglican), the GAFCON and the Anglican Church in North America. He is also a member of the Anglican Consultative Council. In April 2012, Isingoma gave temporary oversight to the Anglican Mission in the Americas, who had disaffiliated from the Anglican Church of Rwanda, until the church body had time to decide his future.

Isingoma was one of the Primates of the Anglican Communion that attended the meeting of the governing bodies of the ACNA in Ridgecrest, North Carolina, in June 2012. He attended GAFCON II, that took place in Nairobi, Kenya, from 21 to 26 October 2013.

He was reelected for another five years at the meeting of the House of the Bishops of the Province that took place at Kinshasa, on 20 August 2014. He defeat by five votes against four, Zacharie Masimango Katanda, Bishop of the Diocese of Kindu. He stated after his reelection that the priorities for his new term would include church-planting and addressing his country socio-economical problems. He also admitted the division of his province in two internal provinces due to his size.

Isingoma announced that he was leaving office for a health improvement break and to return to theological academia on 11 March 2016. This announcement came three years before the completion of his second five-year term in office and seven years before the age of retirement of 65. He was replaced by Masimango, who was enthroned on 12 September 2016.

== Notes ==
Anglican Communion titles
Preceded by Fidèle Dirokpa	Primate of the Province of the Anglican Church of the Congo; 2009–2016	Succeeded by Zacharie Masimango Katanda
