= John Farthing (bishop) =

Canadian Anglican bishop (1861–1947)

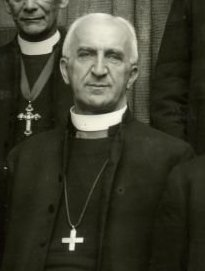
The Right Reverend John Farthing in 1924

John Cragg Farthing (13 December 1861 – 6 May 1947) was the Anglican Bishop of Montreal for 30 years during the first half of the twentieth century.

== Early life and education ==
John Cragg Farthing was born in Toronto to an upper-class Anglican family. He had a sister Ann Cragg Farthing. He was educated at Caius College, Cambridge, England. Ann Farthing became an Anglican missionary, working in the United States territory of Alaska for years during the early 20th century in the Yukon interior.

== Clergyman ==
After Farthing's return to Canada from Cambridge, he was ordained and embarked on an ecclesiastical career with a curacy at Woodstock, Ontario, swiftly followed by elevation to vicar within the same parish.

Promotion followed rapidly and he was, successively, called as a Canon of St Paul's Cathedral, London, Ontario, and Dean of Ontario. He left Ontario when called in 1909 as Bishop of Montreal, serving until 1939. A keen observer of Montreal life, he was a moderate prelate.

== Marriage and family ==
He married Mary Kemp. They had two sons, John Farthing, who became a philosopher. and Hugh Cragg Farthing, a lawyer who followed a political and judicial career in Alberta

== Arms ==
Coat of arms of John Farthing
Crest A demi-lion Azure charged on the shoulder with a cross patté and holding a mullet Or. Escutcheon Azure on a fess engrailed Or between five mullets Argent, three in chief and two in base, three cross crosslets Azure. Motto Immer Da

== See also ==
- List of Anglican Bishops of Montreal

Religious titles
Preceded by James Carmichael	Bishop of Montreal; 1909–1939	Succeeded by Arthur Carlisle
