= Reginald Hollis =

Canadian Anglican bishop

Reginald Hollis was the 9th Anglican bishop of Montreal from 1975 to 1990.

Born on 18 July 1932 in Bedworth, UK, he died in Victoria, British Columbia, on November 9, 2010. He served in the Royal Air Force before he enrolled in theology at Selwyn College, Cambridge, and McGill University before studying for ordination and embarking on an academic ecclesiastical career with chaplaincies at the Montreal Diocese Theological College (where he also lectured) and McGill. Pastoral posts in Quebec led to an administrative role as director of parish and diocesan services back in Montreal and in the mid-1970s elevation to that see's bishopric. In 1989, he was appointed as Metropolitan of the Province of Canada.

On his retirement to Florida in 1990, he became the episcopal director of the Anglican Fellowship of Prayer and an honorary assistant bishop within the Episcopal Diocese of Central Florida.

== See also ==
- List of Anglican Bishops of Montreal

Religious titles
Preceded by Robert Kenneth Maguire	Bishop of Montreal; 1975–1990	Succeeded by Andrew Hutchison
Preceded by Harold Nutter	Metropolitan of Canada; 1989–1990	Succeeded by Andrew Hutchison
