= William Smyth King =

William Smyth King (13 December 1810 – 1 January 1890) was an Irish-Anglican priest and Dean of Leighlin.

He was the eldest son of Hulton King, commissioner of Customs for Ireland. Hulton assumed the Smyth surname upon his marriage to Anne Sarah Talbot, coheir of her grandfather William Smyth of Borris House in County Carlow. Smyth King was educated at Charterhouse School.

In 1841, he married Jane Elizabeth Ellington, eldest daughter of Rev. Henry Preston Ellington. They had four daughters.

Smyth King died at Carlow on 1 January 1890 at the age of 79 years.
