= Briarly Browne =

Canadian Anglican dean

Arthur Tindall Briarly Browne was Dean of Ontario from 1945 to 1964.

Browne was educated at Trinity College, Toronto and ordained in 1924. After curacies in Guelph and Toronto he was the incumbent at St John Norway before his appointment as Dean.
