= Hubert Peacock =

Hubert Henry Ernest Peacock (1913-1995) was Dean of Leighlin from 1983 until 1988.

Peacock was educated at St Edmund Hall, Oxford and ordained deacon in 1939 and priest in 1940. He began his ecclesiastical career in South Africa. He was the Chaplain at Bedford School from 1951 to 1956 when he moved back to South Africa to be Head Master of St George's Grammar School, Cape Town.
