= Fidèle Dirokpa =

Congolese Anglican archbishop (died 2021)

The Most Reverend Fidèle Dirokpa
- Primate of the Congo, Bishop of Kinshasa
- Church: Province of the Anglican Church of the Congo
- See: Kinshasa
- In office: 2003-2009
- Predecessor: Patrice Njojo
- Successor: Henri Isingoma
- Previous post: Bishop of Bukavu

Orders
- Consecration: 1982

Personal details
- Born: Belgian Congo
- Died: 30 December 2021 Kinshasa

Fidèle Dirokpa Balufuga (died 30 December 2021) was a former Democratic Republic of the Congo Anglican bishop. He was the Anglican Archbishop of the Province of the Anglican Church of the Congo. He was also Bishop of Kinshasa.

== Ecclesiastical career ==
Dirokpa was elected Bishop of Bukavu when his diocese was still a part of the Anglican Province of Rwanda, Burundi and Zaire, in 1982, and would be in office until 2003. During his tenure it was created the new Province of the Anglican Church of Zaire, in 1992, renamed Province of the Anglican Church of the Congo, in 1997, upon the changing of the name of the country. He also would be Dean of the Province. He was elected second Primate and Archbishop of the Congo, with his enthronement taking place on 16 February 2003.

Dirokpa was a member of the Global South (Anglican) Primates. He supported the traditional Anglican stance on homosexuality and criticized the departures taken on the issue by the Episcopal Church and the Anglican Church of Canada. However, Dirokpa chose not to declare his province in impaired communion with them, unlike other African Anglican provinces, saying he preferred dialogue between both parts in conflict.

He was succeeded by Henri Isingoma, elected on 28 April 2009, and enthroned in August 2009.

Anglican Communion titles
Preceded by Patrice Njojo	Primate of the Province of the Anglican Church of the Congo; 2003–2009	Succeeded by Henri Isingoma
