= Richard Fleming (priest) =

Richard Gordon Fleming was Dean of Ontario from 1964 to 1976.

Fleming was educated at McGill University and Selwyn College, Cambridge, and ordained in 1955. He held incumbencies in Marmora and Belleville before his appointment as Dean.
