= Reginald Seeley =

Reginald Sidney Kingsley Seeley (1908 – 12 July 1957) was an Anglican Dean of Ontario and Provost of Trinity College, Toronto.

He was born in India, the son of G. H. Seeley, Archdeacon of Rangoon and educated at Marlborough College and Christ's College, Cambridge, graduating B.A. in 1930 and M.A. in 1933. He was ordained in 1932.

After acting as chaplain of St. John’s College, Cambridge from 1934 to 1938, he was appointed Professor of Exegetical Theology at St John's College, Winnipeg and became a canon of St. John’s Cathedral there. In 1941 he was appointed Warden of St. John’s college and examining chaplain to the Bishop of Rupert's Land.

In 1943 he was made Rector of St George's Cathedral, Kingston and Dean of Ontario, serving until 1945, when he accepted the post of Provost at Trinity College, Toronto.

He died on 3 August 1957 in Trenton, Ontario from injuries received in a car accident that took place on 12 June 1957.
