= Bertrand Olivier =

French-born British Anglican priest

Bertrand Maurice Daniel Olivier (born 1962) is a French-born British Anglican priest. Since 2018, he has served as Dean of Montreal and Rector of Christ Church Cathedral, Montreal in the Diocese of Montreal of the Anglican Church of Canada. He was previously a parish priest in the Diocese of Southwark (1996–2005) and then Vicar of All Hallows-by-the-Tower (2005–2018) in the Diocese of London, both of the Church of England.

== Personal life ==
Olivier is gay. He is in a civil partnership with Paul, an IT worker.

Anglican Communion titles
Preceded by Paul Kennington	Dean of Montreal; 2018 to present	Incumbent
