= Zacharie Masimango Katanda =

Congolese Anglican bishop

The Most Reverend Zacharie Masimango Katanda
- Primate of the Congo, Bishop of Kindu
- Church: Province of the Anglican Church of the Congo
- See: Kinshasa
- In office: 11 September 2016-23 January 2022
- Predecessor: Henri Isingoma
- Successor: Georges Titre Ande

Orders
- Consecration: 1996 by Patrice Njojo

Zacharie Masimango Katanda (Note: Due to confusion over Congolese naming customs, Western outlets may not order his names consistently. According to official DRC sources, Masimango is the surname.) (French pronunciation: [zaʃaʁi mazimɑ̃ɡo katɑ̃da]) is a Democratic Republic of the Congo Anglican bishop. He was consecrated as the 4th primate and archbishop of the Province of the Anglican Church of the Congo on 11 September 2016 and was in office until 23 January 2022. He has been bishop of the Diocese of Kindu, since 1996. He is married to Naomi.

== Ecclesiastical career ==
Masimango became the first bishop of the Diocese of Kindu, when it was created in 1996. A supporter of the Anglican realignment, he is involved with the Anglican Mission in the Americas. He was candidate to the offices of primate and archbishop of the Congo in 2014, against Henri Isingoma, receiving four votes against five for his opponent. After Isingoma announced his resignation in March 2014, he was once again candidate. He was elected the primate and archbishop of the Province of the Anglican Church of the Congo on 11 July 2016. Masimango's installation took place at the Cathedral of St. Paul and St. Peter, in Kinshasa, on 11 September 2016.

Former archbishop of the Anglican Church of Tanzania, Donald Mtetemela, preached at the occasion. Among the attendants were also Archbishops Stanley Ntagali of Uganda and Thabo Makgoba, of Southern Africa, and bishop David Bryan, of the Anglican Church in North America. Masimango, like his predecessor, is a supporter of GAFCON and the Anglican realignment. From 2010-2014, he served as Governing Board member of the ACT Alliance.

As of August 2026, he became a partner bishop for the Anglican Missionary Society Global, which became partnered with the Evangelical Episcopal Communion.

== Notes ==
Anglican Communion titles
| Preceded by Henri Isingoma | Primate of the Province of the Anglican Church of the Congo; 2016–2022 | Succeeded by Georges Titre Ande |
