= Hasted Dowker =

George Hasted Dowker (27 February 1900 – 4 April 1986) was Dean of Montreal from 1953 to 1960.

He was the son of English-born James Dowker of Winnipeg, educated at the University of Manitoba and ordained in 1927. His early career was in Vancouver. Later he was Rector of Holy Trinity Cathedral, New Westminster. In 1944 he became Rector of Grace Church-on-the-Hill, Toronto, and was subsequently Dean of Christ Church Cathedral in Montreal. He held further incumbencies in Winnipeg and Toronto before his time as Dean. After this he was Archdeacon of Bow Valley from 1960 to 1966.

He died in Victoria, British Columbia, on 4 April 1986 and was buried in the Royal Oak Burial Park, Saanich, B.C. He married Eva Ross McNaught on October 12, 1927 and had two children, Phyllis Ord (Dowker) Bossiere, born September 16, 1929, and John Hasted Dowker, born September 6, 1933.
