= William Craig (priest) =

William Woodham Craig (1873–1957) was Dean of Ontario from 1926 to 1943.

Craig was educated at McGill University and ordained in 1897. After curacies in Montreal and Saint John, New Brunswick he held incumbencies in Montreal, Ottawa and Vancouver before his appointment as Dean.

He died on Saturday 23 February 1957
