= Désiré Mukanirwa Kadhoro =

Congolese Anglican bishop (1968–2020)

The Right Reverend Désiré Mukanirwa Kadhoro
- Bishop of Goma
- Church: Province of the Anglican Church of the Congo
- See: Goma
- In office: 2016–2020
- Successor: Martin Gordon

Orders
- Consecration: 2016

Personal details
- Born: 22 August 1968
- Died: July 11, 2020 (aged 51) Goma, Democratic Republic of the Congo
- Spouse: Claudaline Muhindo

Désiré Mukanirwa Kadhoro (22 August 1968 – 11 July 2020) was a Democratic Republic of the Congo Anglican bishop. He was the first bishop of the Diocese of Goma in the Province of the Anglican Church of the Congo.

== Early life and education ==
Mukanirwa was born in 1968 in Murambi, Kalehe Territory. He graduated from the Institute Maendeleo de Goma in 1988. In 1997, Mukanirwa earned a theology degree at the Anglican University of the Congo. In 2007, he completed a post-graduate degree in ecumenical studies at the World Council of Churches Ecumenical Institute.

== Biography ==
Mukanirwa was chosen as the first bishop of Goma following the diocese's formation in 2016. During his episcopacy, the diocese grew to 224 congregations served by 45 clergy. Mukanirwa was bishop through the Kivu Ebola epidemic, during which time he hosted a visit by Archbishop of Canterbury Justin Welby.

Mukanirwa also worked to mediate with rebel groups during the M23 rebellion in the Kivu region. Within the broader Anglican world, he was involved with the Global Fellowship of Confessing Anglicans. Mukanirwa died of COVID-19 on 11 July 2020.

Anglican Communion titles
New title	Anglican Bishop of Goma; 2016–2020	Succeeded by Martin Gordon
