= William Lauder (priest) =

Irish Anglican priest

William Bernard Lauder (c. 1818 – 5 February 1868) was an Irish Anglican Dean in the 19th century.

Lauder was born in Youghal, the son of Capt. Thomas Bernard. After earning his B.A. in 1843 and LL.B. and LL.D. in 1868 from Trinity College Dublin, he later emigrated to Canada. He was the incumbent at Kingston, Ontario then Dean of Ontario from 1862 to 1864. In that year he returned to Ireland and became Dean of Leighlin, a post he held until his death.
