= Barry Clarke (bishop) =

Canadian Anglican bishop

- Bishop
- Church: Anglican Church of Canada
- See: Montreal
- In office: 2004–2015
- Predecessor: Andrew Hutchison
- Successor: Mary Irwin-Gibson
- Previous posts: Rector of St Paul's, Lachine

Orders
- Ordination: 1970
- Consecration: 14 October 2004

Personal details
- Born: 1952 (age 73–74) Montreal, Quebec

Barry Bryan Clarke (born 10 October 1952) is a Canadian Anglican bishop. He served as the 11th Anglican Bishop of Montreal, between 2004 and August 2015. He was also previously the interim rector of St. Paul's Cathedral (London, Ontario) and Dean of Huron.

Clarke was born in Montreal and educated at McGill University and the Montreal Theological College. Upon ordination he became curate at St Matthias' Montreal. His career then progressed steadily upwards through incumbencies at St-Bruno, Quebec, St Michael and All Angels, Montreal and St Paul's Lachine before the bishopric of Montreal.

Self-described as a committed youth and community worker, in his ordination speech he appropriated Jesus' claim to "come not to be served, but to serve." He is a supporter of the blessing of same-sex unions.

== See also ==
- List of Anglican Bishops of Montreal

== Notes ==
Anglican Communion titles
Preceded by Andrew Hutchison	Bishop of Montreal; 2004 – 2015	Succeeded by Mary Irwin-Gibson
