= Grahame Baker =

Grahame Brinkworth Baker, AKC was Dean of Ontario from 1977 to 1991.

Baker was educated at King's College London and ordained in 1956. After a curacy in Wandsworth he held incumbencies in British Columbia before his appointment as Dean.
