= Joseph Abbott (Irish priest) =

Dean of Leighlin from 1912 to 1939

Joseph William Abbott was Dean of Leighlin from 1912 until 1939.

Bolton was educated at Trinity College, Dublin and ordained deacon in 1876 and priest in 1876. He began his ecclesiastical career with a curacy in Bilboa. He held incumbencies in Old Leighlin, Tullow and Kiltennel.

He died on 25 April 1939.
