= James Carmichael (bishop) =

James Carmichael (1838–1908) was the fourth Bishop of Montreal for a short two-year spell at the start of the 20th century. A prominent clergyman who participated fully in the direction the church took, he was born in 1838 and educated at Bishop's University. His ecclesiastical career began with a curacy at Clinton, Ontario, followed by stints at The Ascension Hamilton, Ontario, St. George's, Montreal, before he was appointed Dean of Montreal in 1883. In 1906 he became Co-adjutor to the elderly third Bishop of Montreal, William Bennett Bond, whom he eventually succeeded. He died in 1908 in his 70th year, his obituary stating he was a "painstaking administrator rather than a brilliant leader".

== See also ==
- List of Anglican Bishops of Montreal

Religious titles
Preceded by William Bennett Bond	Bishop of Montreal; 1906–1908	Succeeded by John Cragg Farthing
