= George Lothrop Starr =

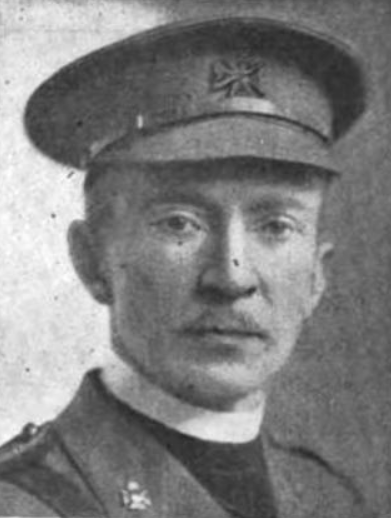

Personal details
- Born: 14 July 1878; Brockville, Ontario
- Died: 19 November 1925 (aged 47); Boston, Massachusetts
- Occupation: Clergyman

George Lothrop Starr (14 July 1878 – 19 November 1925) was a Canadian Anglican clergyman who was Dean of Ontario from 1917 to 1925.

== Biography ==
He was born in Brockville, Ontario. He gained a B.A. in 1895 and an M.A. in 1896 and was created D.D. in 1914.

Ordained a deacon in 1894 and a priest in 1895 he was curate of St John's Church, Norway, Ontario, from 1894 to 1898, after which he served as a chaplain and honorary captain in the Canadian Army. During World War I he was a major in the 37th and 55th Brigades of the British Expeditionary Force in France before acting as chaplain for a number of hospitals in England.

Invalided back to Canada, he was appointed Dean of Ontario in 1917, holding the position until his death in Boston on 19 November 1925.
