= Frederick Bolton =

Frederick Rothwell Bolton (1908–1987) was Dean of Leighlin from 1963 until 1983.

Bolton, born in Warwick to the Irish artist, John Nunn Bolton, and to Florence Francis, he was educated at Fitzwilliam College, Cambridge and ordained deacon in 1933 and priest in 1934. He began his ecclesiastical career with curacies in Beighton, Chesterfield and Frome. He held incumbencies in West Drayton, East Markham, Kilscoran and Ardara. He published The Caroline tradition of the Church of Ireland, with particular reference to Bishop Jeremy Taylor, London: S.P.C.K., 1958.
