= Andrew Hutchison =

Canadian Anglican bishop

The Most Reverend Andrew Sandford Hutchison
- Primate Emeritus of the Anglican Church of Canada
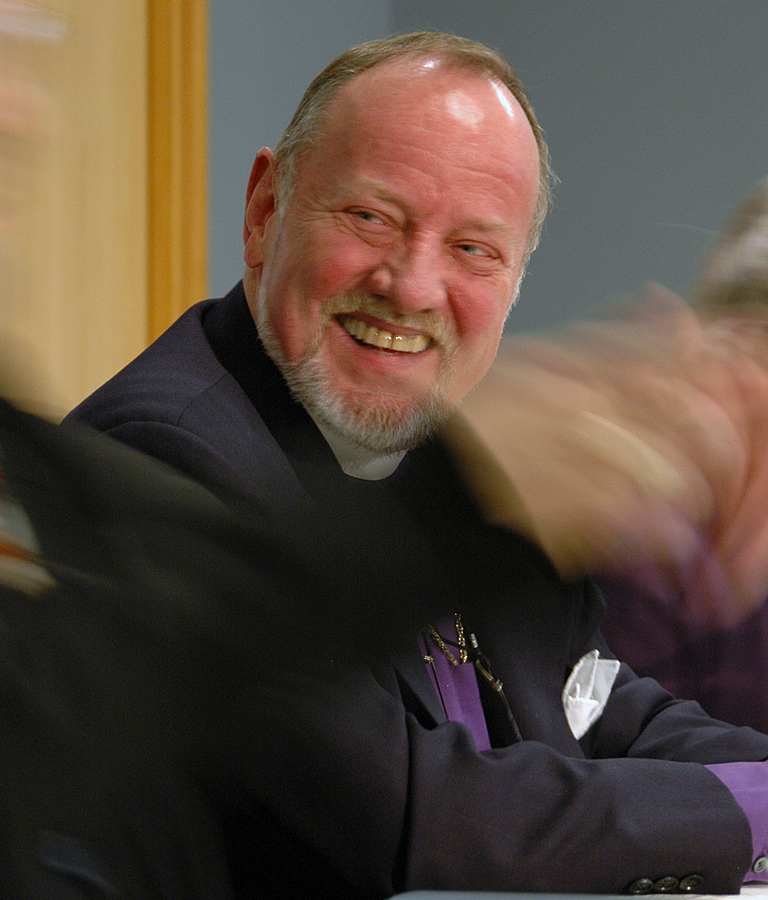
- Archbishop Hutchison in 2007
- Church: Anglican Church of Canada
- See: Extra-diocesan
- In office: 2004–2007
- Predecessor: Michael Peers
- Successor: Fred Hiltz
- Other posts: Archbishop of Montreal and Metropolitan of the Ecclesiastical Province of Canada; Bishop Ordinary to the Canadian Forces

Orders
- Ordination: 1970
- Consecration: 1990

Personal details
- Born: 19 September 1938 (age 87) Toronto, Ontario, Canada

Andrew Sandford Hutchison (born 19 September 1938) is a Canadian retired Anglican bishop who served as Primate of the Anglican Church of Canada from 2004 to 2007. Prior to his election at the General Synod of 2004, he was the Bishop of Montreal and Metropolitan of the ecclesiastical province of Canada (which, despite its name, covers southern Quebec, the Maritimes, and Newfoundland). He was viewed as one of the more liberal contenders in the primatial election, and was Canadian Chair of Affirming Catholicism. He was elected amid controversy over his support for blessing same-sex unions (he had stated he does not favour same-sex marriage as such).

== Life and career ==
Hutchison began his ecclesiastical career as a transitional deacon at Christ Church Deer Park in the Diocese of Toronto. He is a graduate and lifelong supporter of Upper Canada College. Hutchison studied at York University and the University of Trinity College, and he is fluent in English and French.

Following his confirmation as Primate of the Anglican Church of Canada, Hutchison toured Cuba in February 2005, meeting with religious leaders of the Episcopal Church of Cuba and theology students in Cuba, as well as government officials and the Roman Catholic Archbishop.

Hutchison delivered a response in late 2005 to the call for the destruction of Israel by Iranian President Mahmoud Ahmadinejad, condemning Ahmadinejad for his remarks which incite "hatred of the Jewish people and supporting violence against them."

During the 2006 Canadian federal election, Hutchison co-authored a letter (with the Bishop of Toronto and Bishop Michael Pryse of the Evangelical Lutheran Church in Canada's Eastern Synod) to deliver a plea for more funding to alleviate poverty in Canada.

In April 2006, Hutchison announced that he would be retiring in 2007, just after the General Synod elected his successor as well as attaining the retirement age for Anglican clergy (between 65–70 years of age), as he reached his 70th birthday that year.

He was succeeded by Fred Hiltz, the Bishop of Nova Scotia and Prince Edward Island, who was elected Primate on 22 June 2007.

== Honours ==
He was created a Companion of the Roll of Honour of the Memorial of Merit of King Charles the Martyr in 2011.

== See also ==
- List of Anglican Bishops of Montreal

Anglican Communion titles
| Preceded by Reginald Hollis | Bishop of Montreal; 1990–2004 | Succeeded by Barry Bryan Clarke |
| Preceded by Russell Hatton | Bishop Ordinary to the Canadian Forces; 1997–2004 | Succeeded by Peter Coffin |
| Preceded by Arthur Gordon Peters | Metropolitan of Canada; 2002–2004 | Succeeded by Bruce Stavert |
| Preceded by Michael Peers | Primate of the Anglican Church of Canada; 2004–2007 | Succeeded by Fred Hiltz |
