= Kenneth Maguire =

Canadian Anglican bishop

- Born: Robert Kenneth Maguire; 31 March 1923
- Died: 14 October 2000 (aged 77)
- Occupation: Anglican Diocese of Montreal

Robert Kenneth Maguire (31 March 1923 – 14 October 2000) was the 8th Anglican Bishop of Montreal for twelve years.

Born the son of teacher Robert Maguire on 31 March 1923, he was educated at Trinity College, Dublin, and then studied for ordination and embarked on an ecclesiastical career that shuttled between Ireland and Canada. After curacies in Armagh and Montreal, he was Dean of Residence at Trinity College until 1960.

Returning to Canada, he became Rector of the Cathedral Church in Montreal before he became Diocesan Bishop of Montreal in 1963. During his long retirement, he was an honorary assistant bishop in New York and Florida.

== See also ==
- List of Anglican Bishops of Montreal

Religious titles
Preceded by John Harkness Dixon	Bishop of Montreal; 1963–1975	Succeeded by Reginald Hollis
