= Frank Watson =

Frank Watson may refer to:

- Frank Watson (American politician) (born 1945), Republican Minority Leader of the Illinois State Senate
- Frank Watson (Bahamas politician) (born 1940), former Deputy Prime Minister of the Bahamas
- Frank Watson (cricketer) (1898–1976), English first-class cricketer
- Frank Watson (footballer) (1898–1972), English football forward
- Frank Watson (rugby league) (1923–2016), rugby league footballer of the 1940s and 1950s for Leeds, and Castleford
- Frank Rushmore Watson (1859–1940), Philadelphia architect

== See also ==
- Frank Watson Dyson (1868–1939), English astronomer
- Francis Watson (disambiguation)
