= Georges Titre Ande =

Congolese Anglican bishop

The Most Reverend Georges Titre Ande
- Primate of the Congo; Bishop of Aru
- Church: Province of the Anglican Church of the Congo
- Diocese: Aru
- In office: 2022–present
- Predecessor: Zacharie Masimango Katanda

Georges Titre Ande (Note: According to Western news sources, he goes by his post-surname of "Ande" rather than his surname "Titre." Due to confusion over Congolese naming customs, Western outlets may not order his names consistently.) is a Congolese Anglican bishop. Since 2022, he has been primate of the Anglican Church of the Congo.

== Biography ==
Ande obtained his doctorate from University of Birmingham. Since 2006, Ande has also been bishop of the Diocese of Aru in the northeastern Democratic Republic of the Congo, where conflict between DRC troops and Lord's Resistance Army fighters saw destruction of schools and displacement of thousands of Anglicans.

He was a member of the Inter-Anglican Standing Commission on Unity, Faith and Order and supported efforts to create an "Anglican covenant" to avoid a rupture in the Anglican Communion. Upon his installation as primate, he was expected to continue the Congolese church's affiliation with the Global Fellowship of Confessing Anglicans movement within the Anglican realignment.

== Bibliography ==
- Titre Ande, Georges (2010). Leadership & Authority: Bula Matari and Life-Community Ecclesiology in Congo. Eugene, Oregon: Regnum Books International. ISBN 978-1-870345-72-9.

== Notes ==
Anglican Communion titles
Preceded by Zacharie Masimango Katanda	Primate of the Province of the Anglican Church of the Congo; Since 2022	Incumbent
