= Mary Irwin-Gibson =

Canadian bishop

Mary Irwin-Gibson is a Canadian Anglican bishop. From 2015 to 2025, she was bishop of the Anglican Diocese of Montreal. At the time of her election, Irwin-Gibson was Dean of Ontario and rector of St George's Cathedral in Kingston, where she had been in office since September, 2009.

Irwin-Gibson was elected on 6 June 2015 as the twelfth Bishop of Montreal. She assumed responsibility for the diocese on 1 September and was ordained to the episcopate on 29 September, the feast of Michaelmas.

Irwin-Gibson was ordained in Christ Church Cathedral by Bishop Reginald Hollis to the diaconate on June 7, 1981 and to the priesthood on May 16, 1982. She served as Bishop's Missionary in the Parish of Hemmingford-Clarenceville (summer, 1981), as Assistant Curate in the Parish of Vaudreuil (Hudson and Como, 1981–1984), as Rector of Dunham-St. Armand East (1984-1991) and as Rector of the Parish of Ste-Agathe-des-Monts (1991-2009). She was appointed Archdeacon of St. Andrews (Laurentians) in 2000, and served in that position until 2006.

Anglican Communion titles
Preceded by Barry Clarke	Bishop of Montreal; 2015 – 2025	Succeeded by Victor-David Mbuyi Bipungu
