= Patrice Njojo =

The Most Reverend Patrice Njojo
- Primate of the Zaire, later Congo, Bishop of Boga
- Church: Province of the Anglican Church of the Congo
- See: Kinshasa
- In office: 1992-2003
- Predecessor: new title
- Successor: Fidèle Dirokpa

Orders
- Ordination: 1980
- Consecration: 1980

Personal details
- Born: 28 September 1938 Aveba, Belgian Congo
- Died: 5 February 2010 (aged 71) Kampala, Uganda

Patrice Njojo Byankia (Aveba, Belgian Congo, 28 September 1938 - Kampala, Uganda, 5 February 2010) was a Zairian-Democratic Republic of the Congo Anglican bishop. He was the first Primate and Archbishop of the Province of the Anglican Church of the Congo, from 1992 to 2003.

== Early life and ecclesiastical career ==
Njojo parents were both catechists trained by Canon Apolo Kivebulaya. He was the youngest of a family of three boys and one girl. He did elementary school at Boga, finishing it at the Catholic school in Kisangani. He worked as a dactylographer at the office of the legal representative of the Anglican Church of Boga, New Zealander missionary Charles Rendle. He moved to Rwanda, where he did a three years formation at the monitors school. He went back to Boga, to be a teacher for two years. He continued his studies at Aungba, where he finished secondary school, earning his State diploma. After achieving his diploma, he taught at Boga elementary school for a year. He was nominated afterwards the director of the school, and at the same time supervisor of other five elementary schools. He was then nominated missionary inspector, and would be state inspector, in 1973. He had to move from Boga to Djugu because of that, being consecrated as an evangelist by missionary Philip Ridsdale, who offered him a Bible for that purpose. He lived for three years in Djugu, working as an inspector and as an evangelist.

In 1975, he was chosen by the authorities to study for two years at the IFCEP, in Kisangani. In 1977, he was nominated inspector of the city of Bunia. Missionary bishop Philip Ridsdale obtained him a scholarship that allowed Njojo to pursue his studies in Canada. He studied theology with him for six months still in Zaire. He delayed his move to Canada due to his wife health problems.

He was ordained a deacon in May 1976. He was finally sent to study at the University of Montréal, in Canada, for one year, where he studied at the Department of the Bible, earning a certificate. He was ordained an Anglican priest while at Canada. In May 1980, he was elected the second bishop of the Diocese of Boga. In 1992, he was elected the first Primate and Archbishop of the Province of the Anglican Church of Zaire, upon his creation. The province was renamed Province of the Anglican Church of the Congo, when the country changed his name, in 1997. He would serve until 2003. He remained bishop of Boga until his retirement, in 2006.

He died of diabetes, at the Hospital of Nsambia, in Kampala, Uganda, on 5 February 2010. He is buried in Boga.

Anglican Communion titles
Preceded by new title	Primate of the Province of the Anglican Church of Zaire; 1992–2003	Succeeded by Fidèle Dirokpa
