= Gordon Wynne =

(Frederick John) Gordon Wynne (b 1944) was Dean of Leighlin from 2004 until 2010.

Wynne was educated Churchill College, Cambridge and ordained deacon in 1984 and priest in 1985. He began his ecclesiastical career in curacies in Dublin and Romsey. He was the incumbent at Broughton, Hampshire from 1989 to 1997 when he moved to Nurney.

He is the author of Change at Brockenhurst: Recollections of the Lymington Branch Railway.
