= Greg Faull =

Australian rules footballer

Personal information
- Born: 26 February 1969 (age 57)
- Original team: SMW Rovers (MDFL)
- Height: 180 cm (5 ft 11 in)
- Weight: 83 kg (183 lb)

Playing career^{1}
Years	Club	Games (Goals)
1987	Collingwood	1 (0)
- ^{1} Playing statistics correct to the end of 1987.

Greg Faull (born 26 February 1969) was an Australian rules footballer who played with Collingwood in the Victorian Football League (VFL).

Faull came to Collingwood from the Mininera & District Football League's SMW Rovers.

He made one senior appearance for Collingwood in the 1987 VFL season, their 23-point win over the Brisbane Bears at Carrara Oval.
