= Dean of Leighlin =

Irish ecclesiastical office

The Dean of Leighlin is based at the Cathedral Church of St Laserian, Old Leighlin in the united Diocese of Cashel and Ossory within the Church of Ireland.

The current incumbent is Máirt Hanley

== List of deans of Leighlin ==
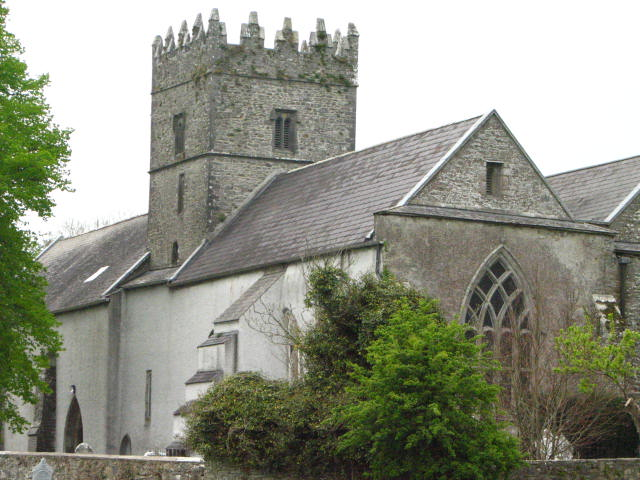
Leighlin Cathedral

- 1603/4–1614 Thomas Tedder
- 1614–1618 Randolph Barlow (afterwards Dean of Christ Church, Dublin, 1618 and Archbishop of Tuam 1629)
- 1618–1637 John Parker
- 1637–1639 Hugh Cressy (later converted to Roman Catholicism as Serenus Cressy)
- 1665/6–1668 John Nearne
- 1668–1671 George Burdett
- 1671/2 Samuel Burgess
- 1691 or 1692 Noah Webbe
- 1695/6–1723 John Francis
- 1723 William Crosse
- 1749–1753 Bartholemew Vigors
- 1755–1764 John Featherston
- 1765–1777 Charles Doyne
- 1777–1778 Richard Stewart
- 1778–1804 Stewart Blacker
- 1804–1822 George Maunsell
- 1822–1850 Hon Richard Boyle Bernard
- 1850–1854 Hugh Usher Tighe (afterwards Dean of Ardagh, 1854)
- 1854–1864 James Lyster (afterwards Dean of Ontario, 1864)
- 1864–1869 William Bernard Lauder
- 1868–1876 Francis Metcalf Watson
- Philip Moore
- ?–1890 William Smyth King
- ?–?1895 Frederick Owen
- 1895–1912 John Finlay (murdered, 1921)
- 1912–1939 Joseph William Abbott
- 1962–1963 Henry McAdoo (Bishop of Ossory, Ferns and Leighlin, 1962)
- 1963–1983 Frederick Rothwell Bolton
- 1983–1988 Hubert Henry Ernest Peacock
- 1991–1996 Cecil Albert Faull
- 2004–2010 Frederick John Gordon Wynne
- 2010–2025 Thomas William Gordon
- 2025- present Máirt Hanley
