= Victor-David Mbuyi Bipungu =

Congolese-born Canadian Anglican bishop

The Right Reverend Victor-David Mbuyi Bipungu
- Bishop of Montreal
- Church: Anglican Church of Canada
- Province: Canada
- Diocese: Montreal
- Elected: 3 May 2025
- In office: 2025–present
- Predecessor: Mary Irwin-Gibson

Orders
- Ordination: 11 August 1996 (diaconate); 29 December 1996 (priesthood)
- Consecration: 3 October 2025 by David Edwards

Personal details
- Born: 1970 or 1971 (age 55–56) Zaire
- Denomination: Anglicanism
- Spouse: Neneh-Brigitte Tshiela Ngoudie
- Children: 3
- Education: Grand Séminaire Christ-Roi, Kananga; Université Catholique du Congo (B.A., M.A.); Université de Montréal (Ph.D.)

Victor-David Mbuyi Bipungu is a Congelese-born Canadian Anglican bishop. Since 2025, he has been the 13th bishop of the Anglican Diocese of Montreal in the Anglican Church of Canada. A native of the Democratic Republic of the Congo (DRC) who began his ministry as a Roman Catholic priest, Mbuyi moved to Canada to work as a priest and study for a Ph.D. He was received as a priest in the Province of the Anglican Church of the Congo in 2014 and later returned to Montreal, where he was an archdeacon in the Diocese of Montreal prior to his election as bishop in May 2025.

== Early life, education and ordination ==
Mbuyi was born and raised in Zaire (the present-day DRC), studying at Catholic seminaries and being ordained in the Roman Catholic Diocese of Luebo in 1996. He was a priest and secondary school teacher in the DRC until 2004, when he relocated to Montreal to study for his doctorate. While completing his Ph.D. in ethics of international relations at the University of Montreal, he also served as a priest at the church of Sainte-Thérèse-d'Avila in Sainte-Thérèse, Quebec.

== Move to Anglicanism ==
Returning to the DRC, in 2014 Mbuyi was received into the Anglican Communion by Archbishop Henri Isingoma and was rector of Cathédrale Saint-Pierre in the Anglican Diocese of Kinshasa. He returned to Montreal in 2016 to become priest in charge of congregations in Rosemère and Laval, where he remained until his election as bishop. He was appointed archdeacon of the St. Andrews archdeaconry in 2020.

In May 2025, Mbuyi was elected bishop coadjutor of Montreal on the fifth ballot. When elected, he expressed surprise, telling synod delegates that "I'm the one born the farthest from here. I'm the least fluent in English. And you have chosen me—you have such courage." He identified his priorities as bishop as: stabilizing the diocese's financial health; reforming its safeguarding policies and procedures; and seeking reconciliation among the anglophone minority in Quebec who long dominated the Diocese of Montreal, francophone Québécois and francophone immigrants to Quebec. He was consecrated as bishop on 3 October 2025, and installed as diocesan bishop of Montreal two days later.

== Personal life ==
Mbuyi is married to Neneh-Brigitte and has three children. He is fluent in French and three Congolese languages and conversant in English and Haitian Creole.

Anglican Communion titles
Preceded by Mary Irwin-Gibson	Bishop of Montreal; Since 2025	Incumbent
