= Aveba =

Village in Ituri Province, Democratic Republic of the Congo

- Village
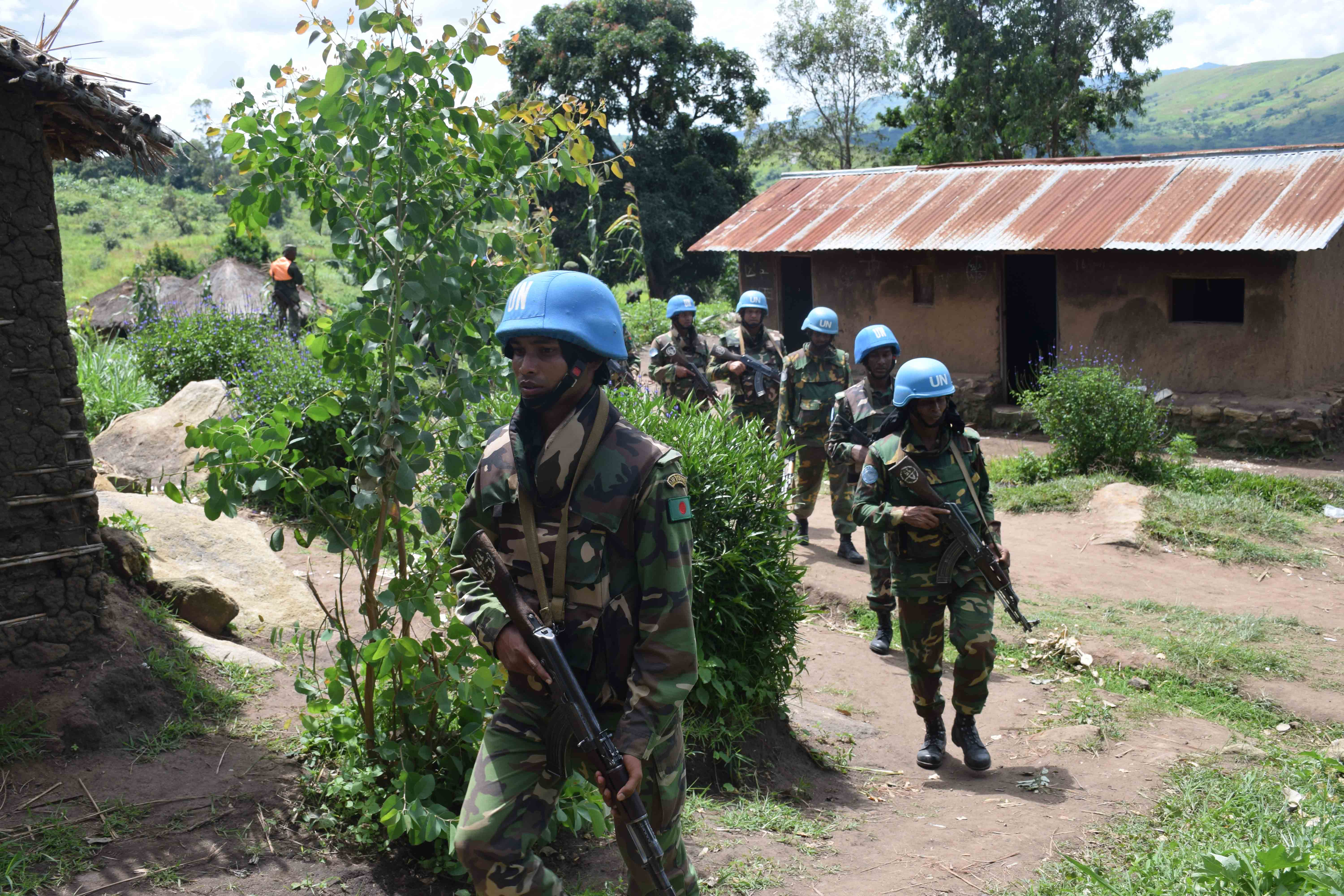
- Bangladeshi troops of MONUSCO in the area

- Location in Democratic Republic of the Congo
- Coordinates: 1°12′N 30°06′E
- Country: Democratic Republic of the Congo
- Province: Ituri
- Territory: Irumu
- Time zone: UTC+2 (Central Africa Time)

Aveba is a village in the Democratic Republic of the Congo in Ituri province, Irumu Territory, Walendu Bindi chiefdom.

Aveba is connected by road to Bogoro, 46 kilometres (29 mi) away. Aveba is located 80 kilometres (50 mi) southwest of the province capital, Bunia.

In the 2000s, thousands of displaced people fled to Aveba due to fighting between the government and local militias.
