= James Lyster =

Church of Ireland priest (1810–1891)

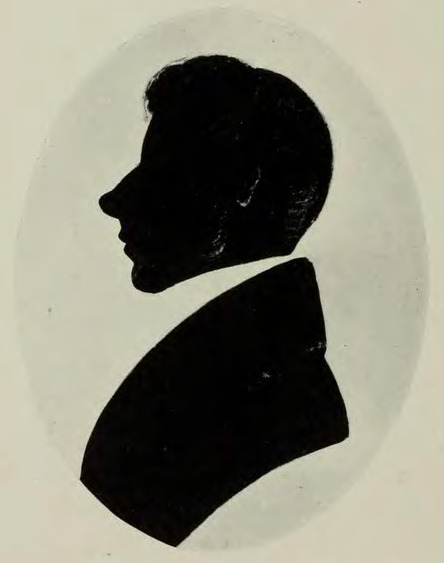
- Born: 7 September 1810
- Died: 2 September 1891
- Education: Trinity College Dublin

James Lyster (7 September 1810–2 September 1891) was an Anglican dean in the nineteenth century.

He was the son of Anthony Lyster, High Sheriff of County Roscommon in 1815, and his wife Jane Fosbery, and the elder brother of George Fosbery Lyster. He was educated at Trinity College, Dublin. He was Dean of Leighlin from 1854 to 1864. He emigrated to Canada to become Dean of Ontario.

Lyster died at Ruthin on 2 September 1891. He had married in 1837 Maria Sarah Keating; they had a son and a daughter.
