= Cecil Faull =

Cecil Albert Faull (1930–2012) was Dean of Leighlin from 1991 until 1996.

Faull was educated at Trinity College, Dublin and ordained deacon in 1954 and priest in 1955. He began his ecclesiastical career with a curacy in the Mariners Church in Dún Laoghaire. He was the incumbent at Portarlington from 1963 to 1971 when he moved back to Dublin to become Rector of St. George's Church, Dublin (he had been a curate here in his early career). He was at Clondalkin from 1981 to 1991.
