= Francis Harold Watson =

British traveller, hunter and trader

Francis Harold Watson aka Frank 'Zambezi' Watson (1854–1905) was a British traveller, hunter and trader.

Watson's first expedition to 'Zambezia' was in 1873 and he subsequently made other journeys to the region, as trader and hunter. He formed a close friendship with Frederick Selous on these trips, and became a business partner of a certain George Westbeech. On an expedition to the Victoria Falls in 1891, he took the first known photographs of the falls and gorges. These photographs are now stored in the Zimbabwe State Archives.
