= Francis Watson (priest) =

Francis Metcalf Watson was Dean of Leighlin from 1868 until 1876.

He was educated at Trinity College, Dublin and was the incumbent at Leighlinbridge. He died on 3 December 1876.
