= Michael Bedford-Jones =

Canadian Suffragan Bishop (1942–2021)

Michael Hugh Harold Bedford-Jones (29 September 1942 – 18 April 2021) was the Canadian Anglican Bishop of Trent-Durham, one of the Suffragan Bishops for the Diocese of Toronto.

Bedford-Jones was educated at Trinity College, Toronto and ordained in 1968. After a curacy at Toronto Cathedral he held incumbencies in the city. He was a suffragan bishop in the Diocese of Toronto from 1994 until his retirement in 2008.

Bishop Michael died from COVID-19-related complications at an Oshawa, Ontario hospital on April 18, 2021, aged 78.
