= Martin Faull =

Australian cricketer

Personal information
- Full name: Martin Peter Faull
- Born: 10 May 1968 (age 58); Darwin, Northern Territory, Australia
- Batting: Right-handed
- Bowling: Right-arm leg break
- Role: Batsman

Domestic team information
- Years: Team
- 1990/91–1998/99: South Australia

Career statistics
Competition	First-class	List A
Matches	30	9
Runs scored	1,541	113
Batting average	29.07	12.55
100s/50s	1/13	0/0
Top score	103	38
Balls bowled	168	–
Wickets	1	–
Bowling average	110.00	–
5 wickets in innings	0	–
10 wickets in match	0	–
Best bowling	1/22	–
Catches/stumpings	19/–	3/–
- Source: CricketArchive, 27 November 2012

Martin Peter Faull (born 10 May 1968) is a former Australian cricketer, who regularly played for South Australia during the 1990s. Born in Darwin, Northern Territory, Faull played cricket for South Australia at both under-16 and under-19 level, as well as for the state's Colts and Second XI sides.

Faull made his first-class debut for South Australia in February 1991 during the 1990–91 Sheffield Shield, in a match against New South Wales at the Adelaide Oval. His first first-class half-century was made the following month, a score of 89 runs in the return match against New South Wales, batting at number three. Faull played regularly at both Sheffield Shield and domestic one-day level throughout the rest of the decade, at first as a middle-order batsman, but later as an opening batsman, often opening alongside Greg Blewett or David Fitzgerald. He was more successful at first-class level, with the 1996–97 season his best, where he scored 459 runs from eight matches (including six half-centuries). Faull's only first-class century came during the 1997–98 season, a score of 103 runs in the second innings of a match against New South Wales, which followed a first innings score of 58 runs. Overall, he played 30 first-class and nine List A matches over his career, with his final matches at both levels coming in the 1998–99 season. In the SACA District competition, Faull played for the Tea Tree Gully District Cricket Club.
