= John Farthing =

Canadian political scientist

John Colborne Farthing
- Born: 18 March 1897; Woodstock, Ontario
- Died: 9 March 1954 (aged 56); Montreal, Quebec
- Resting place: Anglican Cemetery, Woodstock, Ontario
- Education: McGill University (B.A., 1921); New College, Oxford (B.A., 1924)
- Military career
- Allegiance: Canada
- Branch: Canadian Army
- Service years: 1916 – 1916
- Rank: Sergeant
- Units: 66th Field Battery, Canadian Artillery
- Conflicts: World War I

John Colborne Farthing (18 March 1897 – 9 March 1954) was a Canadian soldier, thinker, philosopher, economist, teacher, and author of the seminal tract Freedom Wears a Crown, published posthumously. It rather quickly became an epistle of High Toryism.

== Early years ==
Farthing was born in Woodstock, Ontario on March 18, 1897, to John Farthing and Mary (née Kemp) Farthing. His father was an Anglican priest who rose in the church hierarchy in Ontario, becoming Dean of the Diocese in 1907. In 1909 he was called to Montreal as bishop of the Anglican Diocese, where he served until 1939. His aunt Ann Cragg Farthing served as an Anglican missionary in the United States territory of Alaska, in the interior. She served in Fairbanks and then in smaller Alaska Native villages.

The youngest of two sons, Farthing attended Lower Canada College, and McGill University. After his second year at McGill in 1915, he enlisted with, and went overseas as a Gunner in the McGill Battery, Canadian Field Artillery. He served the balance of the Great War in France with his battery.

== Post-war ==
After the Armistice, Farthing resumed his studies at McGill, graduated with Honours and matriculated to Oxford. He entered the New College to begin Graduate studies. In 1924 he finished with a degree in Modern Greats. For five years after his return to Canada from England, he was a lecturer in Political Science & Economics at McGill; he was considered one of the brilliant young thinkers recruited and nurtured by Stephen Leacock. Farthing was an early sceptic regarding Keynesianism. As a result of the reaction to this then-apostasy, he became disillusioned with academia and so felt compelled to resign his position in 1929.

He spent the tumultuous decade of the 1930s and the Great Depression buried in deep thought, with a view to developing new economic theories. In 1940 he returned to education, this time at Bishop's College School as a Master, a position he maintained until 1949. From then on, he was engaged in critical observation and deep thinking about natural law and the state of nature, freedom, Canada, and the philosophical implications of the Cold War.

Farthing died in Montreal on March 9, 1954.

== Philosophy ==
In Freedom Wears a Crown (published posthumously), Farthing argues that the world is torn between a United States-style republicanism and Marxian socialism. He contended that Canada and the Commonwealth have the means to direct men to a better way, one proven over many centuries to be the "best" way to order human affairs. The essence of his view is that Civil Society is an organism. Much like Richard Hooker in theological and ecclesiastical arguments, Farthing sought a third way between the political polarities of the day.

The central problem with republicanism is that it assumes that the majority is always right, and that majorities will always rule justly. The opposing socialist paradigm, is also problematic because it assumes that the masses are always right and that they will rule justly. Both systems are seen as tending to, or desirous of, perfection. As perfection is unattainable, creating a political and economic system with that as the ultimate goal, can only lead to anarchy and alienation.

Farthing notes:

...There is no such pride and presumption in the ideal of kingdom. It knows nothing of absolute perfection, whether of the present state of liberty, or of a future state of communism. It seeks only to retain what it knows to be good and to attain to whatever is better. And meantime to perform the duties of the moment in which past and future are fused.

The essence of the critique is that arguments about Man's natural state derived from first principles à la thinkers like Thomas Hobbes, John Locke, Jean-Jacques Rousseau, or Karl Marx (as related to his concept of "species being") are bound to lead to erroneous conclusions; no person can "know" what man's natural state truly was. It is lost in the mists of time. It was unrecorded and undocumented, and is so unknowable. To base a civil society on first principles that are unknowable is highly problematic and potentially dangerous.

To Farthing, the British Crown and Westminster model of Parliamentary government are the best guarantors of human freedom, security, and happiness because they do not claim to know the unknowable, and do not seek perfection. Monarchy and Parliament are not based on ideas of perfection, or pure logic, but rather on the accumulated experience of a particular culture over 1000 years. They have also been, in the form of kingship, a part of recorded human history many times; since at least the days of classical antiquity. They are not immediate creations of one person or a few people, but iterative creations of generations of persons. They are the accumulated wisdom of a civilised people.

Furthermore:

...The British idea of a Realm does not deny the importance of Law. It denies only that Law is Supreme.

This is a critical distinction to Farthing, for the law is mutable and changes with the generations to fit the needs of particular times. To saddle an entire culture with base laws that are said to speak for all times, he contends, is the height of folly. Who can know what will be deemed "just" 400 years from now? For Farthing, only free men assembled in a parliament can know such things. Parliament alone is Supreme. And that Supremacy is shared with—in fact, derived from—the Crown.

That the unwritten British Constitution is capable of such change, reform, and at times retraction, seems to Farthing to make it the most sensible form of government. It highlights, in a Edmund Burkean way, the fact that the British system of government is truly a "contract between the living, the dead and those who are yet to be born." To Farthing, that is its essential genius, and something that Canada should not pass up too lightly in trying to emulate the United States and other such ideological and inorganic systems of government.

Farthing's work is derivative of Hooker, Burke, and Tory thinkers of English patrimony. What set Farthing's work apart from theirs is that he was addressing his defence of the British system from the perspective of outsider, in the sense that what he was defending was no longer de rigueur politically.

== Arms ==
Coat of arms of John Farthing
Crest A demi-lion Azure charged on the shoulder with a cross patté and holding a mullet Or. Escutcheon Azure on a fess engrailed Or between five mullets Argent, three in chief and two in base, three cross crosslets Azure. Motto Immer Da (German for 'Always there')
