= Province of the Anglican Church of the Congo =

Province of the Anglican Communion

- Classification: Protestant
- Orientation: Anglican
- Scripture: Holy Bible
- Theology: Anglican doctrine
- Polity: Episcopal
- Primate: Georges Titre Ande
- Associations: Anglican Communion, GAFCON, Global South
- Headquarters: Kinshasa
- Territory: Democratic Republic of the Congo, Republic of the Congo
- Members: c. 500,000

The Province of the Anglican Church of the Congo (French: Province de l'Église anglicane du Congo) is a province of the Anglican Communion, stretching over the Democratic Republic of the Congo and the Republic of the Congo.

== History ==
Formal Anglican structures were established in Boga-Zaire from the 1930s. Metropolitical authority came from the Archbishop of Canterbury until in 1965 the 'Province of Uganda, Rwanda, Burundi, and Boga-Zaire' was established. Following expansion, Uganda became an independent province, leaving the rest of the region as the 'Province of Rwanda, Burundi, and Zaire'. In 1992 the three countries of the united Province each gained independence under their own individual Metropolitan Archbishop, and the Church of the Province of Zaire came into existence. Their first Archbishop was Patrice Njojo. In 1997, to reflect the change in name of the nation, the church became known as the Province of the Anglican Church of the Congo. Archbishop Njojo was succeeded by Fidèle Dirokpa in 2003, who held office until 2009. The Most Rev. Henri Isingoma was elected the third Archbishop of the Congo on April 28, 2009. Most of the Congolese Anglicans lives in the eastern Swahili speaking region of the country, the most damaged part of Congo due to two civil wars. The Diocese of Kinshasa also includes part of the Republic of the Congo.

== Archbishop of the Congo ==
The Archbishop of the Congo, known as Zaire until 1997, is both metropolitan and primate. The holders of the office have been:

- Patrice Njojo, 1992–2003
- Fidèle Dirokpa, 2003–2009
- Henri Isingoma, 2009–2016
- Zacharie Masimango Katanda, 2016-2022
- Georges Titre Ande, January 23, 2022—

== Dioceses ==
The Anglican Church of the Congo has 14 dioceses with one missionary area in Kalemie.

- Aru
- Beni
- Diocese of Boga-Zaire
- Bukavu
- Kalima
- Kamango
- Kasai
- Katanga
- Kindu
- Kinshasa
- Kisangani
- Nord Kivu
- Goma (The first bishop, Désiré Mukanirwa Kadhoro, died in office in 2020. He was succeeded by Martin Gordon in 2023.)
- Congo Brazzaville

== Ordination of women ==
The Province of the Anglican Church of the Congo permits the ordination of women as deacons. In 2003, the Diocese of Boga "accepted women's ordination" and the first woman, Muhindo Tsongo, was ordained a priest.

== Anglican realignment ==
The Anglican Church of the Congo is a member of the Global South and the Global Anglican Future Conference, and is involved at the Anglican realignment. In June 2012, Archbishop Henri Isingoma attended the Provincial Assembly of the Anglican Church in North America, in Ridgecrest, North Carolina, to show is full support for the new province in creation of the Anglican Communion. While involved in the Anglican realignment, the Anglican Church of the Congo has also shared ministry partnerships and remained in communion with the Episcopal Church.

On April 29, 2012, Henri Isingoma expressed his official approval for the temporary admission of the Anglican Mission in the Americas, a former missionary organization of the Anglican Church of Rwanda, at the Anglican Church of Congo until his future was clarified. After that period, Isingoma stated that the Anglican Church of the Congo would work with the AMiA exclusively as a Missionary Society.

Archbishop Isingoma attended GAFCON II, which took place in Nairobi, Kenya, from 21 to 26 October 2013. The province was represented at GAFCON III, held in Jerusalem, on 17–22 June 2018, by a 34 members delegation. In 2025, after the announcement made by Laurent Mbanda, the chairman of GAFCON, criticising the appointment of Dame Sarah Mullally as the Archbishop of Canterbury, and calling on GAFCON affiliated churches to cut ties with the Diocese of Canterbury, Archbishop Zacharie Masimango Katanda, a former Primate of the province, stated that the province of Congo will remain for now in the Anglican Communion and in communion with the see of Canterbury. The Primate of the province, Georges Titre Ande, did not attend the March 2026 GAFCON Conference in Abuja, Nigeria.
