= Christ Church Cathedral (Montreal) =

Coordinates: 45°30′13″N 73°34′12″W

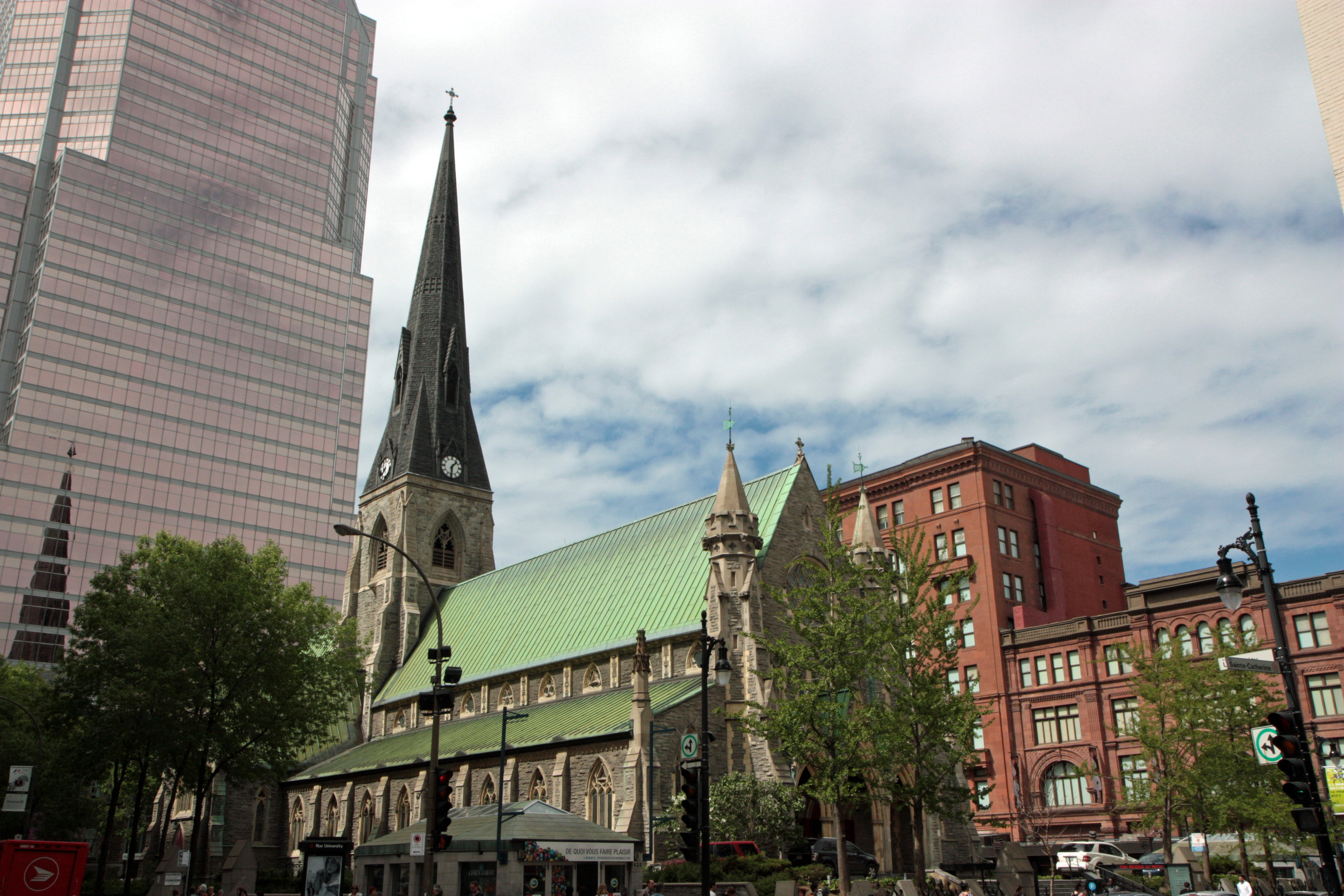
- Christ Church Cathedral, with the Tour KPMG office tower in the background

- Location within Montreal
- Location: 635 Saint Catherine Street west Montreal, Quebec, Canada
- Denomination: Anglican
- Website: www.montrealcathedral.ca

History
- Status: active
- Founded: 1789
- Dedication: Jesus Christ
- Consecrated: 1867

Architecture
- Architects: Frank Wills; Thomas Seaton Scott
- Architectural type: Neo-Gothic
- Groundbreaking: 1857
- Completed: 1860

Specifications
- Length: 62 metres (203 ft)
- Width: 33 metres (108 ft)
- Height: 70 metres (230 ft)

Administration
- Province: Canada
- Diocese: Montreal

Clergy
- Bishop: Victor-David Mbuyi Bipungu
- Dean: Bertrand Olivier
- Pastor

National Historic Site of Canada
- Official name: Christ Church Cathedral National Historic Site of Canada
- Designated: 1999

Patrimoine culturel du Québec
- Official name: Monument historique classé
- Designated: 1988

Christ Church Cathedral (French: Cathédrale Christ Church) is an Anglican Gothic Revival cathedral in Montreal, Quebec, Canada, the seat of the Anglican Diocese of Montreal. It is located at 635 Saint Catherine Street West, between Avenue Union and Boulevard Robert-Bourassa. It is situated on top of the Promenades Cathédrale underground shopping mall, and south of Tour KPMG. It was classified as historical monument by the government of Quebec on May 12, 1988. In 1999, it was designated a National Historic Site of Canada.

== History ==
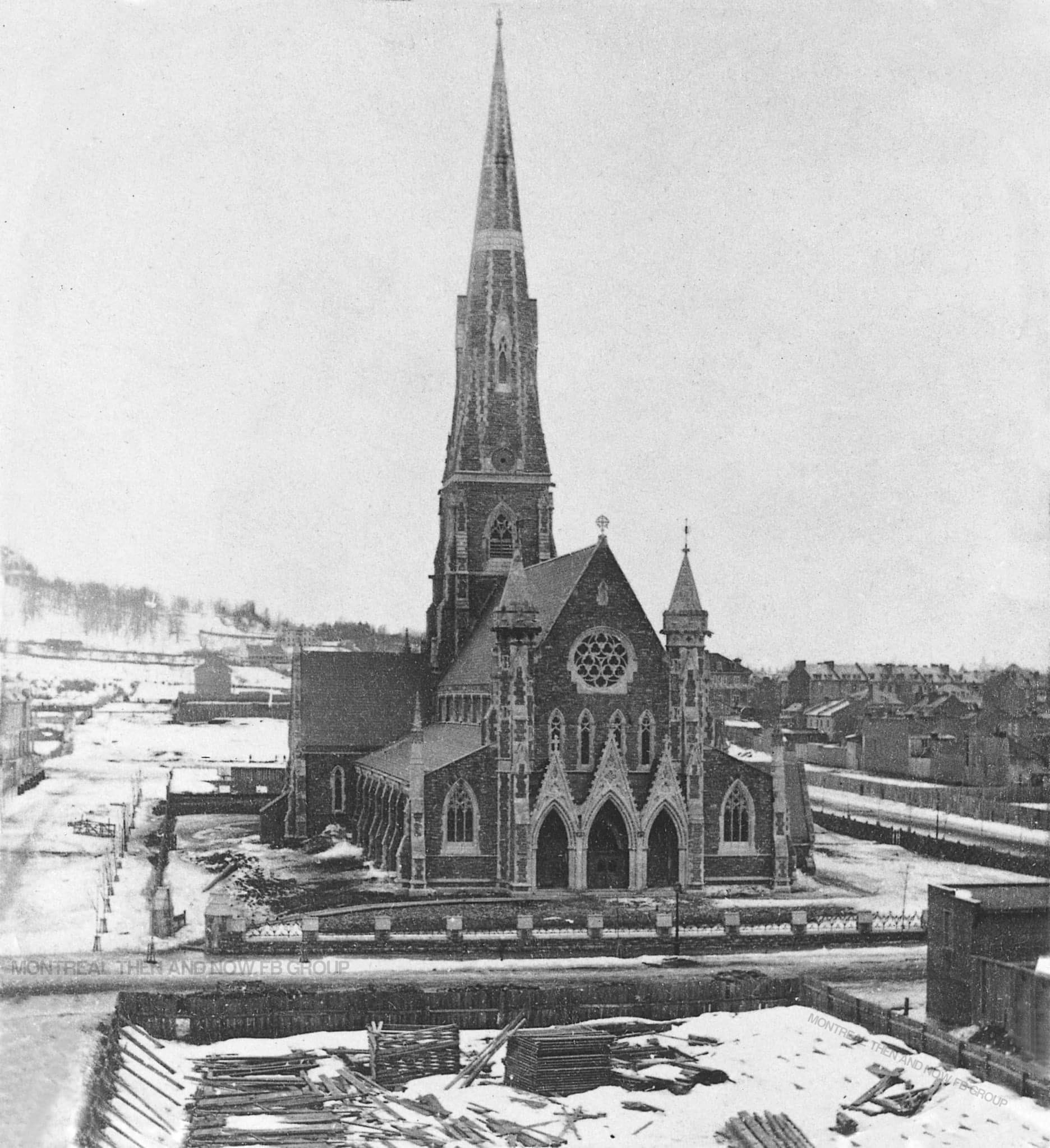
The exterior in 1860

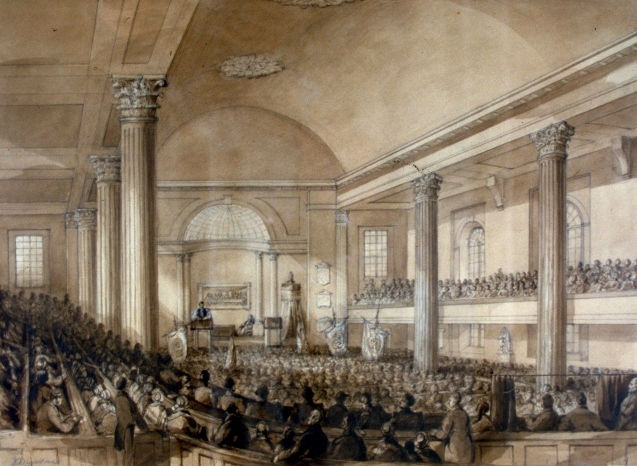
The interior of the previous Christ Church Cathedral in 1852

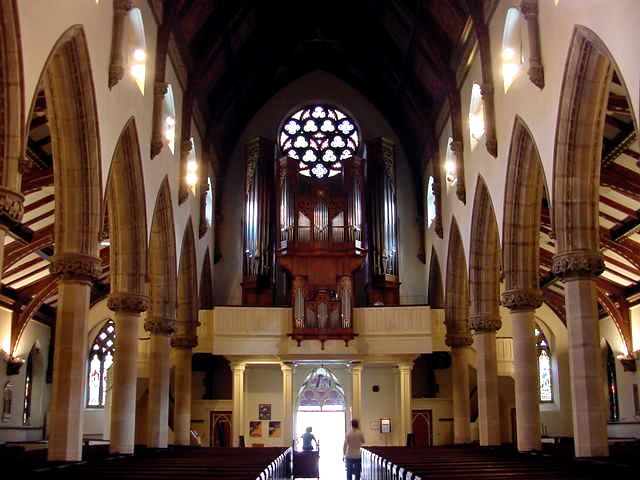
The interior of the present Christ Church Cathedral

An Anglican ministry first began in Montreal in 1760. Services were held initially in two nearby chapels of the Roman Catholic Church: Hôtel-Dieu chapel in the first year, then Récollet chapel until 1789. In that year, the Anglican congregation of Montreal received a former Jesuit church (erected 1719), renaming it as Christ Church. This repaired and re-dedicated Jesuit church was the first Christ Church. It was used by the congregation until 1803, when it was destroyed in a fire. A second church building was constructed as its replacement in 1814.

The clergyman was appointed by Dorchester as garrison chaplain of Montreal in 1766. The inaugural service in Christ Church was pronounced by him on 20 December 1789.

In 1850, the second Christ Church was designated as the cathedral for the new Anglican Diocese of Montreal upon its separation from the Anglican Diocese of Quebec. The cathedral was destroyed by fire in 1856.

The present cathedral, a neo-Gothic structure, was designed by architect Frank Wills (1822–1856), who also designed Christ Church Cathedral in Fredericton, New Brunswick. Before construction began, Willis died, and Montreal architect Thomas Seaton Scott (1826–1895) was commissioned to carry out his design. The structure was completed in 1859 and consecrated in 1867.

Andrew Taylor oversaw alterations and other restoration of the cathedral from 1890 to 1891 and installed a memorial window for Mrs. A.C. Hooper in 1902–03.

Modeled after the 14th century Gothic-style churches of the English countryside, the cathedral features a square crossing tower.

Unfortunately, the design, though acclaimed for its architecture, suffered from important engineering flaws. The soft ground could not support the heavy central stone tower and steeple, which began to subside and lean. This defect formed the basis of an important lawsuit concerning builder's liability, which went all the way to the Judicial Committee of the Privy Council, at that time the highest court in the British Empire. The Judicial Committee upheld the decisions of the Quebec courts, which had held that the builder was liable for having built the steeple on ground that could not support its weight: Wardle v. Bethune The case was often cited as precedent relating to article 1688 of Quebec's original Civil Code.

By 1920, the tower leaned 1.2 m (3.9 ft) to the south. George Allan Ross designed alterations in 1923 and reconstructed the tower from 1939 to 1940. In 1927, the stone steeple, weighing 1,600,000 kg (3,500,000 lb) was removed. New foundations were poured in 1939, and in 1940, an anonymous donation permitted the construction of a much lighter steeple made of aluminum, molded to simulate the former stone spire. It is 38 m (125 ft) high, attaining a height of 70 m (230 ft) from the ground.

Recent additions to the church include a choir gallery, built in 1980, and the church's third organ, installed in 1981. Notable musicians to have served as the church's organist include Alfred Whitehead (1922–1947), S. Drummond Wolff (1952–1956) and Patrick Wedd (1996–2018).

The organ is opus 77 of Karl Wilhelm, Inc. of Mont-Saint-Hilaire, Quebec. It is a mechanical key and stop instrument with four-manuals, 42 stops and 63 ranks. In 1992, the pedal division was expanded with a 32' Bombarde.

The organ replaced the earlier instrument that served the congregation from 1859. The earlier instrument was constructed by William Hill and Son in London to duplicate an organ given to the congregation by King George III and destroyed in the fire of 1856. The Hill instrument was remodeled and enlarged several on at least five occasions during the tenure of its service. In 1979, the congregation commissioned the mechanical organ and the earlier instrument was sold for parts.

=== Promenades Cathédrale ===
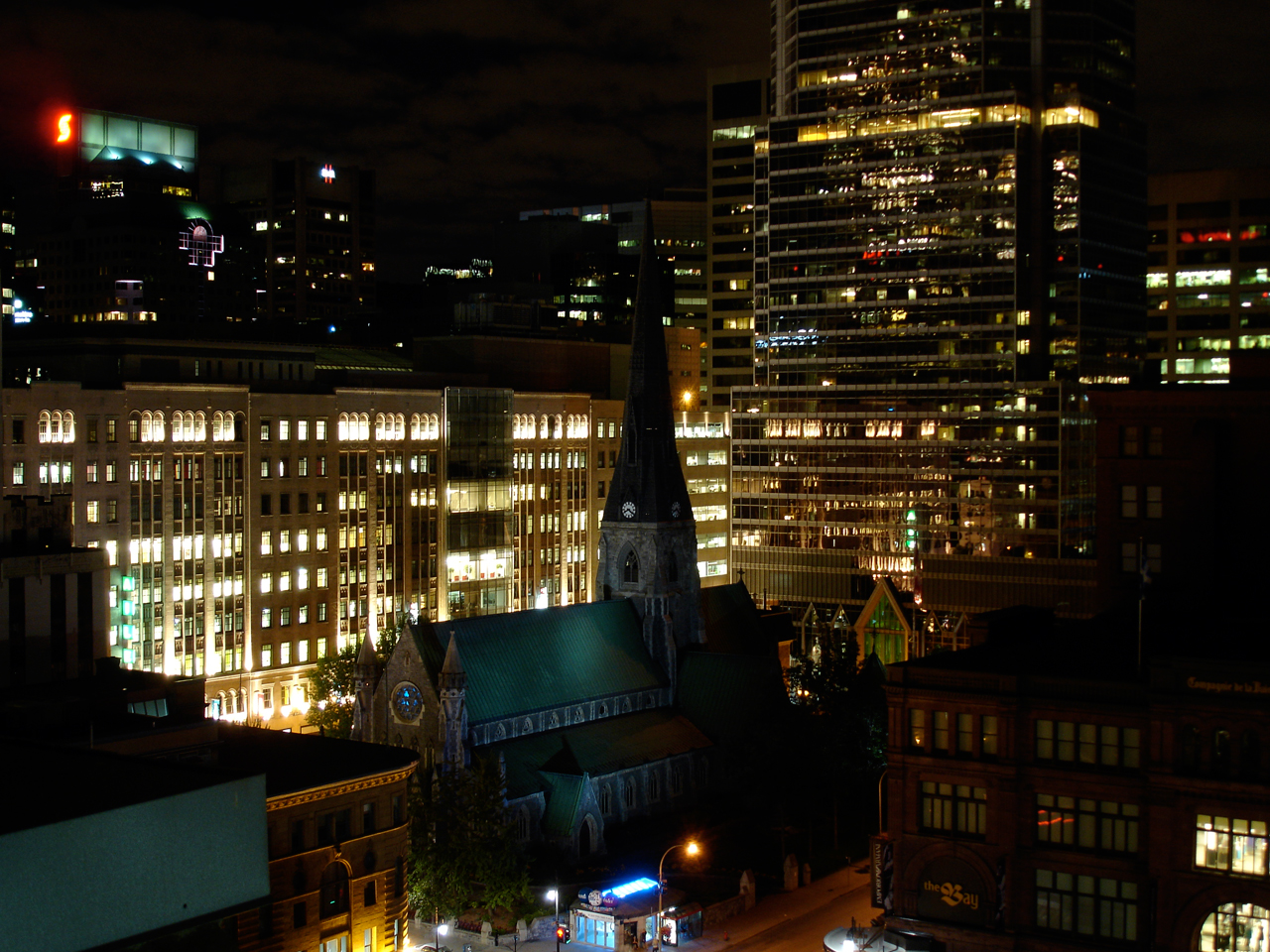
Christ Church Cathedral at night

In the 1980s, a vast real estate project was undertaken below the cathedral. The project consisted of a 34-floor skyscraper, Tour KPMG, built north of the cathedral, underground parking, and two levels of retail stores situated beneath the cathedral. For a period in 1987, the cathedral was supported on stilts while footings for the underground mall, Promenades Cathédrale, were excavated. This project allowed for the linkage of the eastern and western branches of Montreal's underground city, connecting the Eaton's store (subsequently Complexe Les Ailes) and The Bay's Henry Morgan Building.

== Canadian Grenadier Guards ==
Christ Church Cathedral is the regimental church of the Canadian Grenadier Guards. The guards maintain their traditional ties with the church, as well as to McGill University, by marching from the Arts Building on campus, to the cathedral, annually in commemoration of Remembrance Day. The cathedral also houses the guards' retired regimental colours.

== See also ==
- List of cathedrals in Canada
- Dean of Montreal
