= Anglican Diocese of Montreal =

Diocese of the Anglican Church in Canada

Coordinates: 45.5038°N 73.5702°W

Diocese of Montreal Diocèse de Montréal
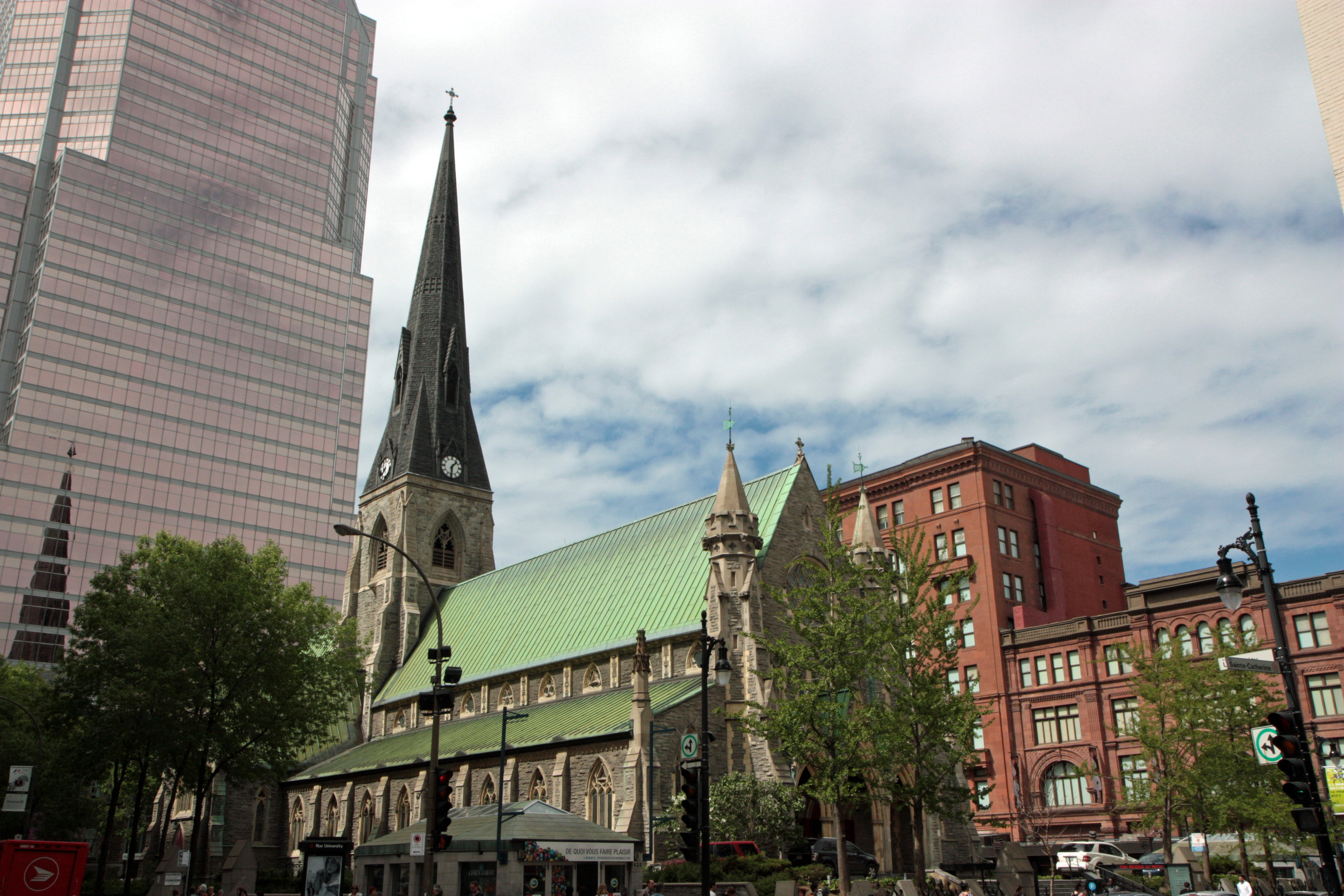
- Christ Church Cathedral

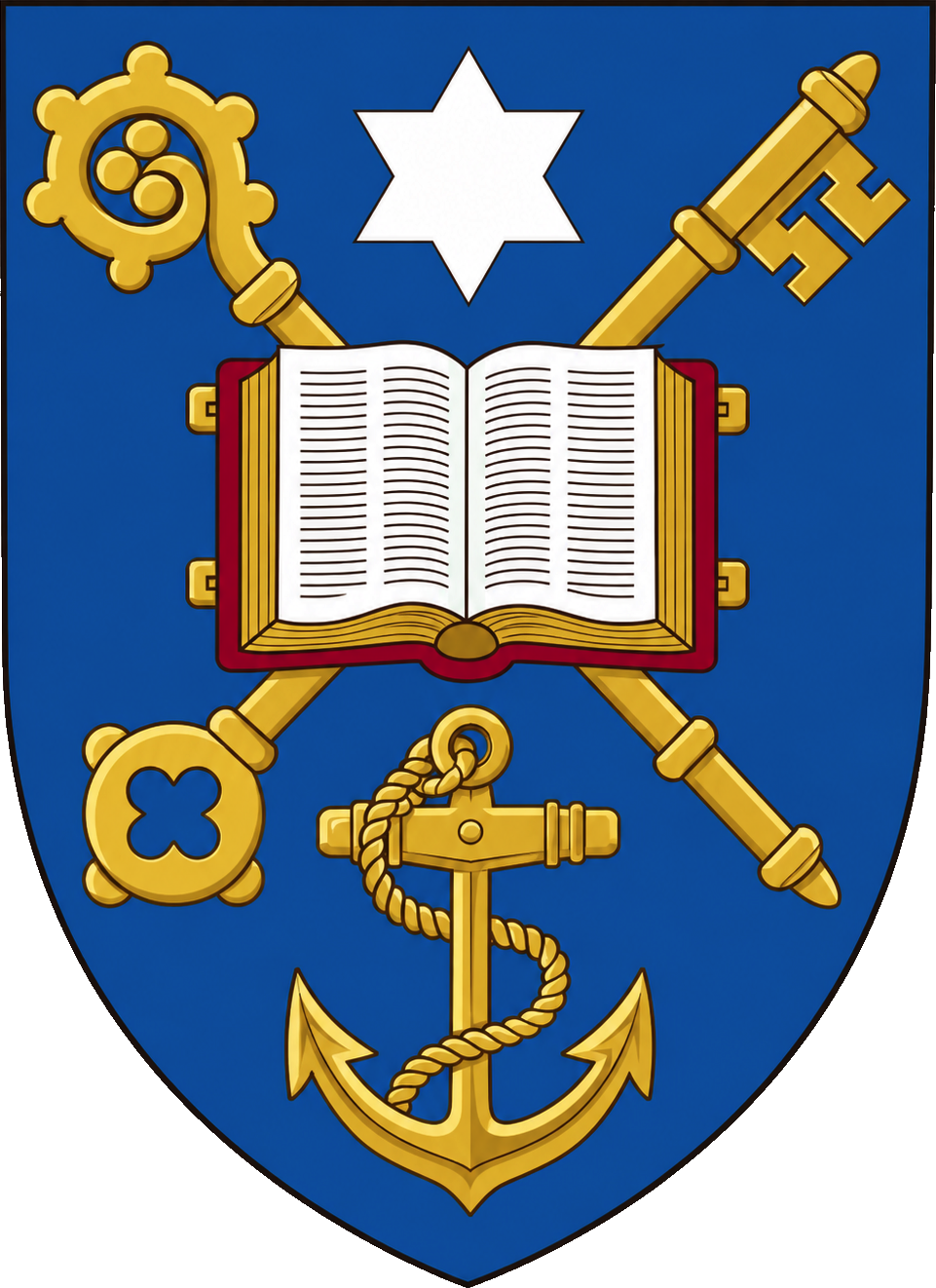
- Coat of Arms

Location
- Country: Canada
- Ecclesiastical province: Canada
- Headquarters: 1440 Union Ave.; Montreal, Quebec

Statistics
- Area: 21,400 km^{2} (8,300 sq mi)
- Population: Total: (as of 2021); 29,455
- Parishes: 68 (2022)
- Members: 7,025 (2025)

Information
- Denomination: Anglican Church of Canada
- Rite: Book of Alternative Services; Book of Common Prayer
- Established: 1850; 176 years ago
- Cathedral: Christ Church Cathedral
- Language: English, French

Current leadership
- Bishop: Victor-David Mbuyi Bipungu
- Dean: Bertrand Olivier

Map
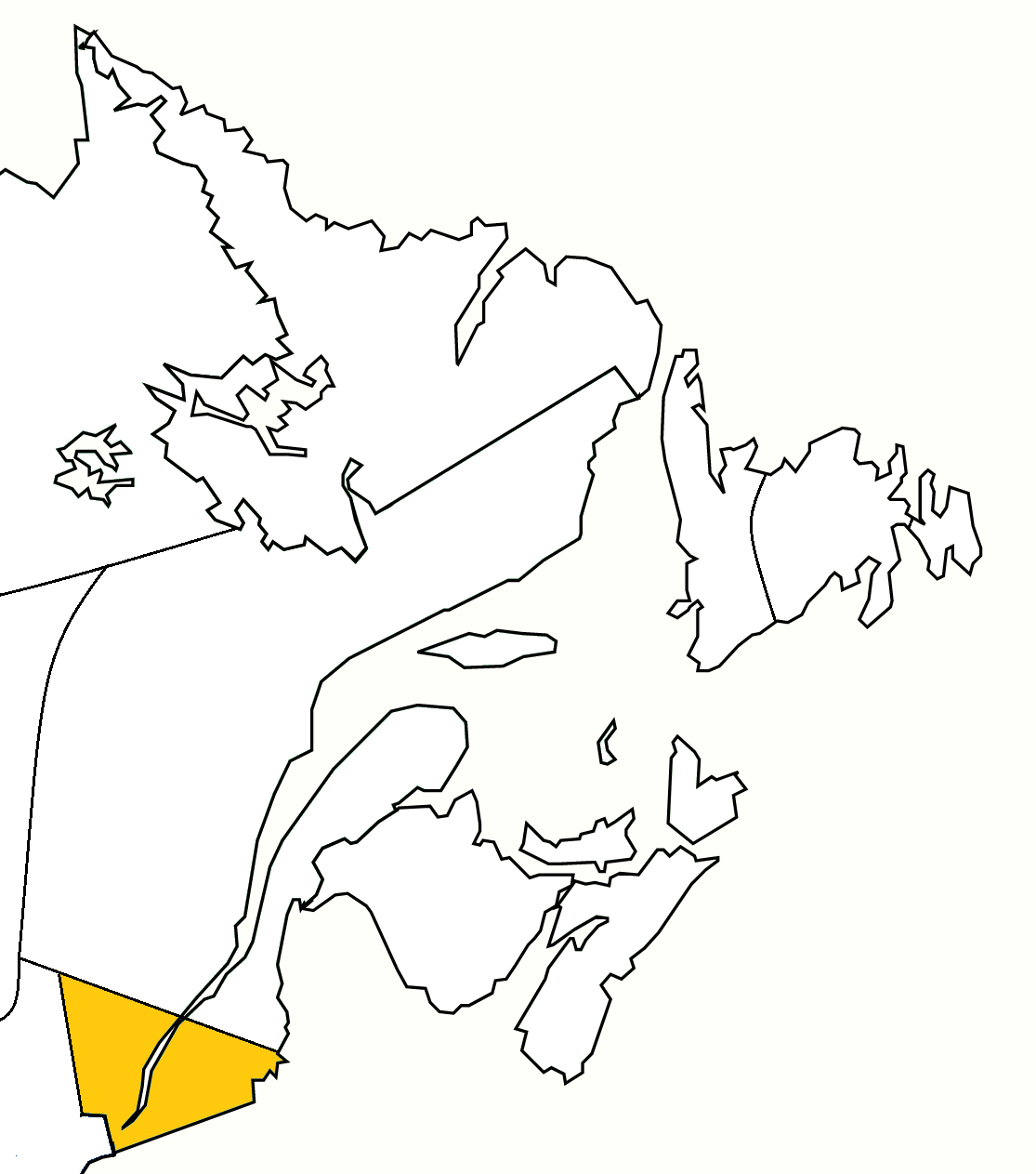
- Boundaries of the diocese within the Ecclesiastical Province of Canada

Website
- www.montreal.anglican.ca

The Diocese of Montreal is a diocese of the Ecclesiastical Province of Canada of the Anglican Church of Canada, in turn a province of the Anglican Communion. The diocese comprises the 21,400 square kilometres (8,300 sq mi) encompassing the City and Island of Montreal, the Laurentians, the South Shore opposite Montreal, and part of the Eastern Townships. The See city is Montreal, and the cathedral is Christ Church.

The diocese maintains approximately 7,025 on its parish rolls in sixty-eight parishes as of 2025. Meanwhile, 29,455 people residing in the territory covered by the Diocese self-identified as being Anglican on the 2021 Census.

As of 2025, the diocesan bishop is Victor-David Mbuyi Bipungu.

== History ==
Following the Conquest of New France, the territory part of the Diocese of Montreal was under the jurisdiction of several other dioceses. It formed part of the Diocese of London from 1760 to 1787, followed by the Diocese of Nova Scotia, from 1787 to 1793, and then the Diocese of Quebec from 1793 until 1850 where there was a suffragan bishop of Montreal from 1836). The Anglican diocese of Montreal was formally established by letters patent in 1850, with the first synod occurring nine years later.

The Diocese of Montreal would also cede territory on three occaisions, first with the area around Rouyn-Noranda to the Diocese of Moosonee in 1946, followed by the Temiscaming area to the Diocese of Algoma and the Deanery of Clarendon (which covered the Quebec counties of Pontiac, Gatineau, Hull and portions of Papineau) to the Diocese of Ottawa in 1965.

=== Growth and decline ===
Membership in the Anglican Diocese of Montreal
Year	Pop.	±%
1850	25,000	—
1919	88,315	+253.3%
1961	94,891	+7.4%
1976	51,126	−46.1%
1981	38,000	−25.7%
1986	32,131	−15.4%
1991	24,773	−22.9%
1996	21,540	−13.1%
2006	15,105	−29.9%
2016	10,719	−29.0%
2019	7,039	−34.3%

While Montreal was the largest Canadian city and the centre of commerce in the country, the diocese thrived. In recent decades, however, as these attributes have shifted to Toronto, the English-Canadian population in the diocese has shrunk dramatically, forcing the merger and the closure of parishes.

The diocese had an original membership of 25,000 at its founding in 1850. It grew to a peak of 95,000 members in 1961 before declining to 38,000 in 1981.

With both the dioceses of Montreal and Quebec now having less than 10,000 members, and decreasing membership, discussions are underway for the eventual merger of the two fading dioceses, beginning with an exploration of opportunities for combined administration.

== Bishops ==
While part of the Diocese of Quebec, the territory of the Anglican Diocese was represented by Suffragan Bishop of Montreal George Mountain (who was also Coadjutor Bishop of Quebec to Charles Stewart from 1836 until Stewart's death in 1837), and continued serving as suffragan of Montreal until the establishment of the Diocese of Montreal in 1850.

The first Anglican Bishop of Montreal was Francis Fulford who was appointed by the Crown to the role on July 19, 1850 and formally sworn consecrated at Westminster Abbey on July 25 by the Archbishop of Canterbury and five assisting bishops including John Strachan of the Diocese of Toronto. On September 15, he was enthroned at the original Christ Church Cathedral (which itself had been built in 1814 and was designated the cathedral when Montreal became a Diocese in 1850 a role it held until it was destroyed by fire in 1856).

Following Fulford's death in 1868, all subsequent Bishops of Montreal were elected at Montreal Diocesan Synod.

== Churchmanship and theology ==
The Diocese of Montreal, both prior to its formal establishment and afterward, was long considered to be in the evangelical wing of Anglicanism.

This would be moderated somewhat by the original Bishop of Montreal, Francis Fulford, who was influenced by the Oxford Movement. Fulford had protested when Edward Bouverie Pusey, who was denied use of the pulpit at Oxford and later stayed with Pusey on return visits to England. Fulford also had correspondence with John Henry Newman, although remained Anglican after Newman converted to Roman Catholicism. The Anglo-Catholic tradition would remain both small but also persistent in the Diocese over the years, albeit always in a minority position, largely centered around the Church of St. John the Evangelist and occaisionally a few other churches.

Subsequent bishops Ashton Oxenden, William Bond and James Carmichael, who were elected by clergy and laity, were all considered Evangelical-leaning, and this churchmanship would remain dominant into the early 20th century.

Today, like the Anglican Church of Canada generally, broad churchmanship and liberal theology dominates. This wing was present in various forms going back to the mid-nineteenth century, grew in promineace in the 1940s and became predominant at around the time of the changes taking place in Quebec society during the Quiet Revolution in the mid-1960s and early 1970s. One such outcome of the growth of influence of this wing pertains to the ordination of women in the Diocese.

Dr. Lettie James was the first woman in the Diocese of Montreal ordained to the diaconate in 1976 and later to the priesthood in 1978 by Bishop Reginald Hollis following a vote at the General Synod of the Anglican Church of Canada and the 1978 Lambeth Conference. This was followed 37 years later with the first woman being ordained to the episcopate with the consecration of Bishop Mary Irwin-Gibson in 2015.

A form for blessings for same-sex unions was approved by in 2010 by Bishop Barry Clarke.

== Archdeaconries, deaneries and parishes ==
In 1866, there was one archdeaconry: J. Scott was Archdeacon of Montreal.

=== Bedford and the Richelieu ===
==== Bedford and Brome-Shefford ====
- Ascension Anglican Church, West Brome, Brome Lake
- All Saints Anglican Church, Dunham
- All Saints Anglican Church, North Ely, Sainte-Christine
- Bishop Stewart Memorial Church, Frelighsburg
- Grace Church, Sutton
- Holy Trinity Anglican Church, Iron Hill, Brome Lake
- St. James Anglican Church, Brome Lake
- St. George's Anglican Church, Granby
- St. James Anglican Church, Bedford
- St. James the Apostle Anglican Church, Stanbridge East
- St. James the Apostle and Martyr Anglican Church, Farnham
- St. Luke's Anglican Church, Waterloo
- St. Paul's Anglican Church, Abbotsford, Saint-Paul-d'Abbotsford
- St. Paul's Anglican Church, Knowlton
- St. Thomas Anglican Church, Noyan
- Trinity Anglican Church, Nelsonville, Cowansville

==== South Shore ====
- Christ Church, Sorel
- St. Francis Anglican Mission Church, Odanak
- St. Barnabas Anglican Church, Saint-Lambert
- St. George's Anglican Church, Châteauguay
- St. James Anglican Church, Ormstown
- St. John's Anglican Church, Huntingdon
- St. Joseph of Nazareth Church, Brossard
- St. Margaret of Antioch, Saint-Hubert, Longueuil
- St. Martin's House, Otterburn Park
- St. Paul's Anglican Church, Greenfield Park, Longueuil
- St. Stephen's with St. James, Chambly
- St. Thomas Anglican Church, Rougemont
- Trinity Church, Havelock
- Trinity Church, Saint-Bruno-de-Montarville

=== Montreal ===
==== Hochelaga ====
- Christ Church Cathedral, Downtown Montreal
- St John the Evangelist, Downtown Montreal
- St. George's Anglican Church, Downtown Montreal
- St Jax Church, Downtown Montreal
- St. Hilda Anglican Church, Rosemont–La Petite-Patrie, Montreal
- St. Matthias' Anglican Church, Westmount

==== Western Montreal ====
- Anglican Church of St. Mark and St. Peter, Saint-Laurent, Montreal
- Church of the Epiphany, Verdun, Montreal
- St. Lawrence Anglican Church, Lasalle, Montreal
- St. Paul's Anglican Church, Côte-des-Neiges–Notre-Dame-de-Grâce, Montreal
- St. Philip's Anglican Church, Montreal West
- St. Simon and Bartholomew Anglican Church, Laval
- St. Thomas' Anglican Church, Côte-des-Neiges–Notre-Dame-de-Grâce, Montreal

=== St. Lawrence ===
==== Pointe-Claire ====
- All Saints by the Lake, Dorval
- St. John the Baptist Anglican Church, Pointe-Claire
- St Stephen's Anglican Church, Lachine, Montreal

==== St. Anne ====
- Christ Church, Beaurepaire, Beaconsfield
- St. Barnabas Anglican Church, Pierrefonds-Roxboro, Montreal
- St. George's Anglican Church, Sainte-Anne-de-Bellevue
- St. James Anglican Church, Parish of Vaudreuil, Hudson
- St. Mary's Anglican Church, Parish of Vaudreuil, Como, Hudson
- St. Michael and All Angels Anglican Church, Pierrefonds-Roxboro, Montreal

=== St. Andrew ===
==== Laurentians ====
- All Saints Church, Deux-Montagnes
- Christ Church, Rawdon
- Église de la Nativité, Rosemère
- Holy Trinity Calumet, Grenville-sur-la-Rouge
- St. Margaret Anglican Church, Mascouche
- St. Matthew's Anglican Church, Grenville

==== Regional Ministry of the Laurentians ====
- Christ Church, Mille-Isles
- Grace Anglican Church, Arundel
- Holy Trinity Church, Sainte-Agathe-des-Monts
- St Paul's Anglican Church, Dunany, Gore
- St. John the Baptist Anglican Church, Kilkenny, Saint-Hippolyte
- St. Francis of the Birds Anglican Church, Saint-Sauveur
- St Simeon's Anglican Church, Lachute
- Trinity Church, Morin-Heights

== Other facilities ==
- Mile-End Community Mission, Le Plateau Mont-Royal, Montreal
- Montreal Diocesan Theological College, Ville-Marie, Montreal
- Ste-Anne's Hospital Chapel, Sainte-Anne-de-Bellevue

== See also ==
- Dean of Montreal
