= St Mary's Church, Snettisham =

Parish church in Norfolk

Coordinates: 52°52′46″N 0°30′38″E

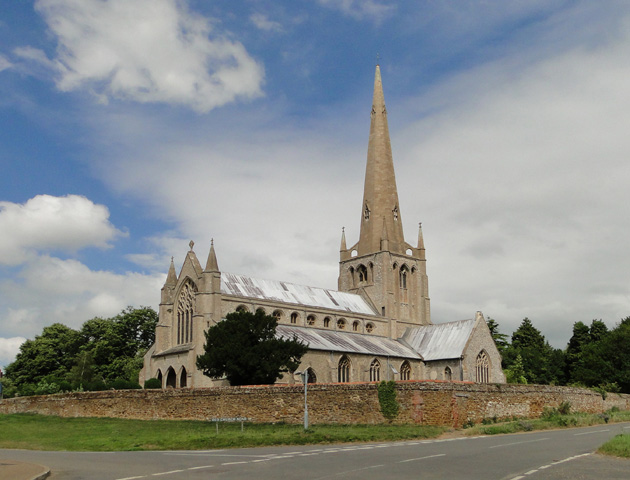
St Mary's Church, Snettisham

St Mary's Church is the parish church of Snettisham in the English county of Norfolk. It is dedicated to the Virgin Mary. The church is late-14th-century Decorated and partly later reconstruction. It is Grade I listed.

== History ==
The church was built in the late 14th century in the Decorated style, a phase of English Gothic architecture characterised by elaborate window tracery and rich ornamentation. The listing description suggests that it is the best example of a Decorated church in Norfolk. It is built from flint with stone dressings and a stone spire. The spire reaches to 175 feet (53 m) and was traditionally a navigation feature for mariners in The Wash. The tower with spire is above the transept crossing.

The design was originally cruciform: the 40-foot-long chancel was demolished by Sir Wymond Carye before 1600, and the north transept was reduced in 1597. There is a galilee porch to the west. The church was restored by Frederick Preedy in 1856.

During the First World War, the church sustained damage from a bombing raid by the German Navy Zeppelin L 4 on 19 January 1915. A bomb landed nearby, reportedly striking part of the structure.

== Features ==
There is a 15th-century pulpit, with painted panels; the font is also 15th-century.

=== Bells ===
The church has a ring of six bells, originally dating from 1710 and cast by Thomas Newman. In 1958 they were overhauled and three of the six were recast by John Taylor & Co. A 13th-century sanctus bell is also displayed in the church.

=== Stained glass windows ===
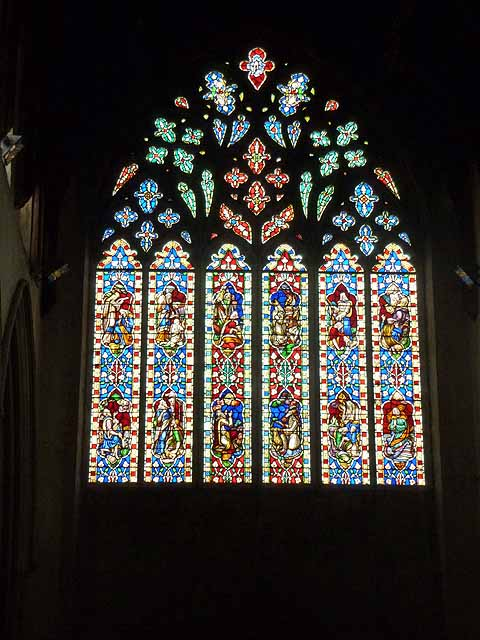
The west window in St Mary's Church, Snettisham, by William Warrington

Stained glass in the east window was installed by Frederick Preedy in 1855–56. This was destroyed by a Zeppelin bomb in WWI. It was replaced by Percy Bacon Brothers in 1920. That window is a five-light depiction of the Crucifixion. The west window is six-lights, depicting scenes from the Old Testament, and is an early work by William Warrington, dating from before 1850.

The windows in the nave are by Preedy, M & A O'Connor, and Burlison & Grylls, with a modern 3-light window by Paul Jeffries of G King & Son, depicting the Blessed Virgin with the symbols of the four gospel writers.

=== Organ ===
The organ dates from 1885 and was made by Alfred Kirkland.

== Christ Church Cathedral, Fredericton, New Brunswick ==
The Anglican diocese of Fredericton in New Brunswick was established in 1845, with John Medley as its first bishop. Medley chose St Mary's, Snettisham, as the model for the new Fredericton cathedral. Before leaving England, Medley hired the Exeter architect Frank Wills to visit St Mary's and make detailed plans, which Medley had with him when he arrived in Fredericton. With additional work by William Butterfield, the cathedral was consecrated in 1853.

== Parish activities ==
There are annual illuminations of the church each December.
