= John Medley =

Church of England Bishop (1804–1892)

The Right Reverend John Medley
- Bishop of Fredericton
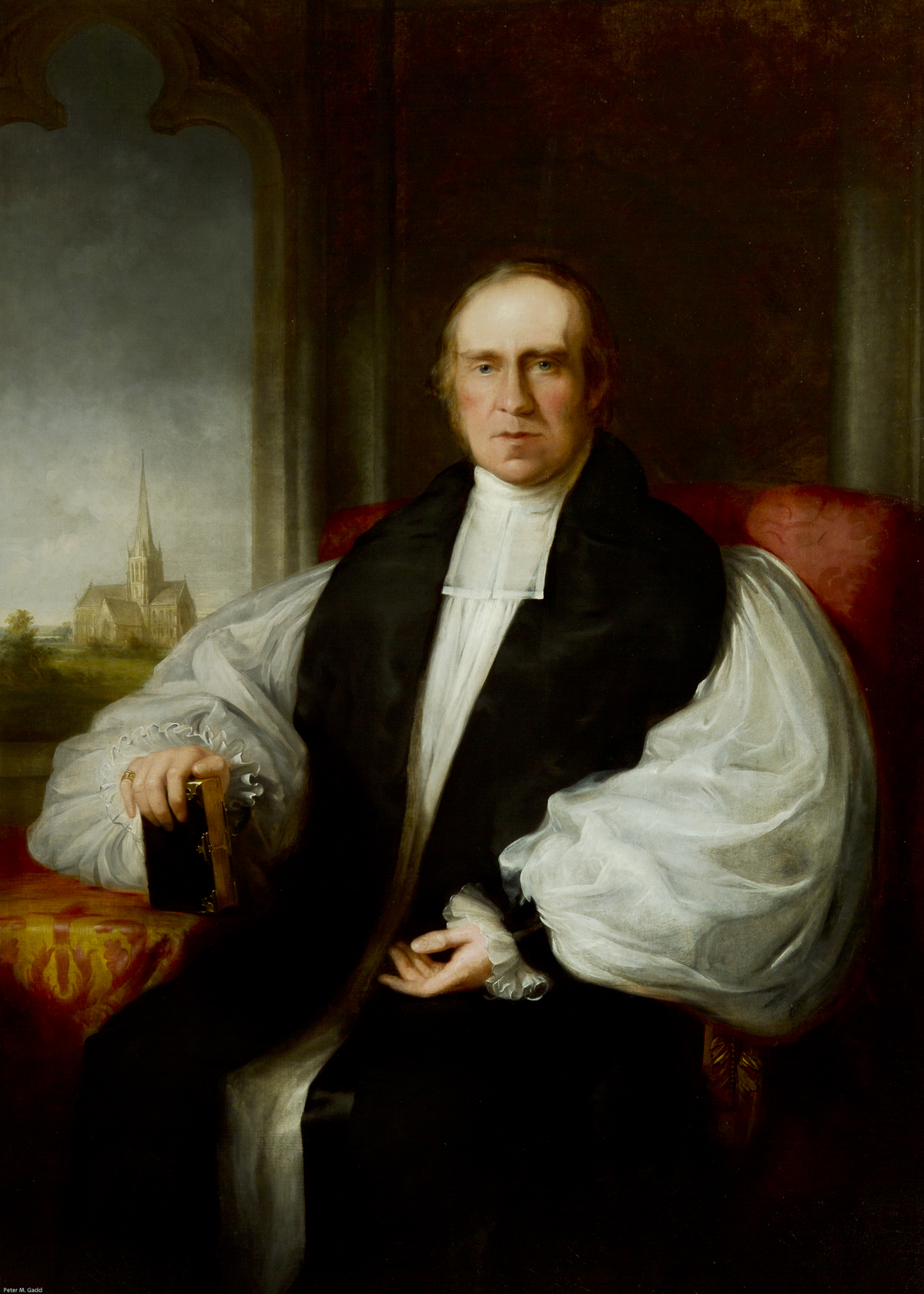
- 1848 portrait by John Bridges
- Province: Canada
- Diocese: Fredericton
- In office: 1845–1892
- Successor: Tully Kingdon
- Other post: Metropolitan Bishop of Canada 1879—1892
- Previous posts: Vicar of St. Thomas's Church, Exeter (1838—1845); Prebendary of Exeter Cathedral (1842—1845)

Orders
- Ordination: 1829
- Consecration: 4 May 1845 by William Howley

Personal details
- Born: 18 December 1804 London, England
- Died: 9 September 1892 (aged 87) Fredericton, New Brunswick
- Buried: Fredericton
- Denomination: Church of England
- Spouse: Christiana Bacon (1826—1841); Margaret Hudson (1863—his death)
- Education: Wadham College, Oxford

John Medley (19 December 1804 – 9 September 1892) was a Church of England clergyman who became the first bishop of Fredericton in 1845. In 1879 he succeeded Ashton Oxenden as Metropolitan of Canada.

== Education and family ==
John Medley was born in Grosvenor Place, London. His father, George Medley, died when John was very young. His widowed mother wanted him to become a clergyman and had him educated accordingly. He began learning Latin at the age of six, Greek at ten, and Hebrew at twelve years old, and attended schools in Bristol, Bewdley and Chobham before entering Wadham College, Oxford in 1823. He graduated with honours from Wadham College in 1826.

On 10 July 1826, John Medley married Christiana Bacon, a daughter of the sculptor John Bacon. They had five sons and two daughters. The second son, Thomas, died in 1839. Christiana Medley herself died of tuberculosis in 1841. At that time the youngest child, also named Christiana, was only one year old. The elder daughter, Emma, died of scarlet fever in 1843. In 1844 John Medley's mother, who had moved into the vicarage and was caring for the children, was killed in a carriage accident in which he also was seriously injured.

The five remaining children went with Bishop Medley to Fredericton in 1845. His daughter Christiana married Henry John Lancaster of the 15th (The Yorkshire East Riding) Regiment of Foot in May 1864. One of his sons, Spencer Medley, became an officer in the Royal Navy before settling in New Zealand. His three other sons became clergymen. John Bacon Medley and Edward Shuttleworth Medley both returned to serve in parishes in England, while Charles S. Medley remained in New Brunswick, where he was rector of the parishes of Sussex and Studholm.

John Medley's second wife was Margaret Hudson. Born in 1821 in Carlisle, Cumberland, she was the daughter of a Royal Navy Commander. She grew up in the village of Crossmead, which was in Medley's parish of St Thomas, Exeter and later became a hospital nurse, a profession which she followed for 20 years. She came to Canada in 1863, accompanying the Bishop when he returned from a visit to England. They were married on 16 June 1863 in St. Anne's Church on Campobello Island. Bishop Medley and his second wife had no children. Mrs. Medley died in Fredericton in 1905.

== Career in England ==
Before becoming Bishop of Fredericton in 1845, Medley held several posts in the Diocese of Exeter, which corresponded to the counties of Devon and Cornwall. He was ordained as a deacon in 1828 and as a priest in 1829. From 1828 to 1831 he was curate of Southleigh, and from 1831 to 1838 perpetual curate of St. John's Church in Truro. In 1838 he became vicar of St. Thomas's Church, Exeter, and in 1842 he was appointed prebendary of Exeter Cathedral.

Medley supported the Anglo-Catholic Oxford Movement – also known as Tractarianism – and was well acquainted with its leaders John Keble and Edward Bouverie Pusey. He also was a friend of William Ewart Gladstone, a lay supporter of the Oxford Movement. He collaborated on the translation of two volumes of homilies by Saint John Chrysostom, published in Pusey's Library of the Fathers in 1839. His Tractarian views were also evident in his 1835 essay The Episcopal form of church government and in a volume of his sermons which was published in 1845.

== Views on church architecture ==
John Medley was a strong proponent of Gothic Revival architecture. At Exeter, he founded the Exeter Diocesan Architectural Society and acted as its secretary. The Exeter Society was in contact with the Cambridge Camden Society, which approved its efforts to study and promote this architectural style. In 1841 Medley published a volume called Elementary Remarks on Church Architecture, which was praised by the Cambridge Camden Society's periodical The Ecclesiologist.

Medley also involved himself in building new churches in his parish. One of these was St. Andrew's in Exwick, whose architect was John Hayward. The Ecclesiologist described St. Andrew's in 1842 as "the best specimen of modern church we have yet seen". Hayward, a member of both the Exeter Diocesan Architectural Society and the Cambridge Camden Society, was the employer of Frank Wills, who would later be taken to North America by Medley as architect of Fredericton's Christ Church Cathedral. Among the additions Medley made to his own St. Thomas's Church was a tomb for his late wife, with an effigy carved by her father, John Bacon.

One of the Cambridge Camden Society's firm principles was that seating in churches should be free. Medley shared this strong opposition to the charging of pew rents and published an article on "The Advantages of Open Seats" in the 1843 Transactions of the Exeter Diocesan Architectural Association. His insistence on free and open church seating proved controversial when he became Bishop of Fredericton and embarked on a church-building program that began with Christ Church Cathedral and St. Anne's Chapel of Ease. Both the Cathedral and St. Anne's Chapel had free seats, and Bishop Medley refused to consecrate any new church in which pew rents were charged. This was a break with the tradition, particularly common in North America, of raising money for the parish by renting pews. The Bishop's insistence on free seats was not always readily accepted. In one case, in the parish of Upham, a church remained unconsecrated for five years because the local church leaders would not comply with Medley's rule.

== Bishop of Fredericton ==
Prior to 1845, the Anglican Church in New Brunswick was part of the responsibility of the Bishop of Nova Scotia. This proved unsatisfactory because of the large territory involved, and the need for a Bishop dedicated to New Brunswick had been expressed by William Colebrooke, Lieutenant Governor of New Brunswick, and by John Inglis, Bishop of Nova Scotia, among others. In 1836, when a general meeting of the New Brunswick clergy met to establish a Church Society, New Brunswick had 80 parishes, of which only 28 had resident clergymen, and 43 had church buildings. In the early 1840s some of New Brunswick's leading citizens, including Ward Chipman, Jr., the province's Chief Justice, and Solicitor General George Frederick Street, undertook to raise funds to endow a separate bishopric of New Brunswick. They were successful in raising £2,150. Meanwhile, the Colonial Bishoprics Fund was established in England with the goal of endowing new bishoprics in the British Colonies. The Colonial Bishoprics Fund was administered by William Howley, Archbishop of Canterbury, and the other English bishops. In 1843 they decided to give £20,000 to endow a separate bishopric in New Brunswick, which would be the Episcopal See of Fredericton.

In October 1844, Howley wrote to Medley offering him the position, with an income of approximately £900 a year, and Medley accepted. He was the first Tractarian to be appointed bishop in the Church of England. Howley did not state who had recommended him for the position, but it is probable that the recommendation had come from Medley's friends and fellow Tractarians John Taylor Coleridge and William Ewart Gladstone, who were treasurers of the Colonial Bishoprics Fund.

Medley was consecrated as the first Bishop of Fredericton by Howley himself at Lambeth Palace on 4 May 1845. He was enthroned in Fredericton on 11 June 1845. Medley's Anglo-Catholic views made him an object of suspicion to some in New Brunswick, where the American tradition of Congregationalist polity, in which each church congregation was self-governing, was also influential. He did, however, have supporters within the clergy and although his own opinions were strongly held, his encouragement of coexistence between high and low church Anglicans gradually gained him acceptance. Soon after his arrival, he began visiting all parts of the diocese, building and consecrating churches, training and ordaining priests, and confirming parishioners.

=== Church building ===
Medley arrived in Canada with plans drawn by the young Exeter architect Frank Wills for a cathedral to be based on St. Mary's Church in Snettisham, Norfolk. He had been granted £1,500 toward the cost of construction by the Exeter Diocesan Architecture Society, and the population of the new diocese pledged a further £4,500. A lot on the Saint John River was donated, as was the building stone, and the cornerstone of Christ Church Cathedral was laid on October 15, 1845. In 1848 and 1851 the Bishop visited England and raised more funds to allow the construction to continue. The design was completed by architect William Butterfield after Wills left New Brunswick in 1848 to set up a practice in New York City. The cathedral, which was consecrated on 31 August 1853, has been described as "the largest and most carefully ecclesiological church of the North American revival".

To have a suitable church in which to preach during the construction of the cathedral, Medley built St. Anne's Chapel, which Frank Mills designed. It was begun in May 1846 and consecrated in March 1847.

Medley was dissatisfied with the architectural style of New Brunswick's wooden parish churches. He obtained from the Ecclesiological Society (as the Cambridge Camden Society was known after 1845) a wooden model to be used as a pattern for building wooden churches. He was assisted in his church building program by his son Edward, who had studied architecture with Butterfield in England before becoming a clergyman.

=== Church governance ===
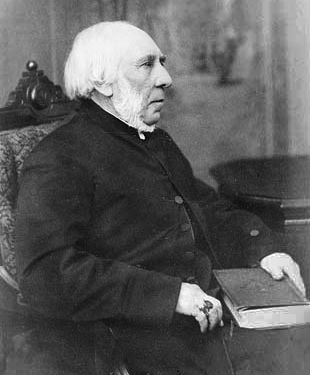
John Medley in later life

Beginning in August 1845, the Bishop went on annual visitation tours to all parts of the diocese. In 1847 he began to hold Triennial Visitations of the Clergy, at which province's parish priests gathered in Fredericton. He divided the diocese into seven deaneries whose rural deans were elected by the clergy and confirmed by the bishop.

In 1852 Medley proposed to form a diocesan synod, but this was strongly opposed by the New Brunswick clergy. However, in 1866 the synod was set up as a voluntary organisation consisting of clergy, laity and bishop. Its annual meetings began in 1868, and it was officially incorporated in 1871 by the Legislative Assembly of New Brunswick. In 1874 the Fredericton Synod began sending delegates to the synod of the Ecclesiastical Province of Canada.

Medley attended two of the three Lambeth Conferences that were held during his lifetime. At the second conference in 1878 he was asked by the Archbishop of Canterbury for his opinion of the Public Worship Act, which prohibited ritualism in the Church of England, and spoke strongly against the Act. Medley was accompanied at the third conference in 1888 by his son Charles. He and the other bishops attending the conference received honorary LL.D. degrees from Cambridge University and Doctor of Divinity degrees from Durham University. In 1879, Medley was elected Metropolitan of Canada (the bishop first-among-equals in the eastern half of all Canada) and held that position until his death.

=== Last years ===
In 1879 he requested a coadjutor bishop to assist him with his duties. His request was granted and he nominated Tully Kingdon, who was consecrated in the role by Medley himself on 10 July 1881 in Fredericton.

Medley's son Charles died in 1889. Charles had been his father's chaplain and the secretary of the Diocesan Synod, as well as rector in Sussex. Medley preached his final sermon at Saint Paul's Church in Saint John, New Brunswick in July 1892 and died in Fredericton on 9 September 1892. He was buried on 13 September beneath the Cathedral's east window.
