= Tully Kingdon =

British Anglican bishop (1835–1907)

The Right Reverend Tully Kingdon
- Bishop of Fredericton
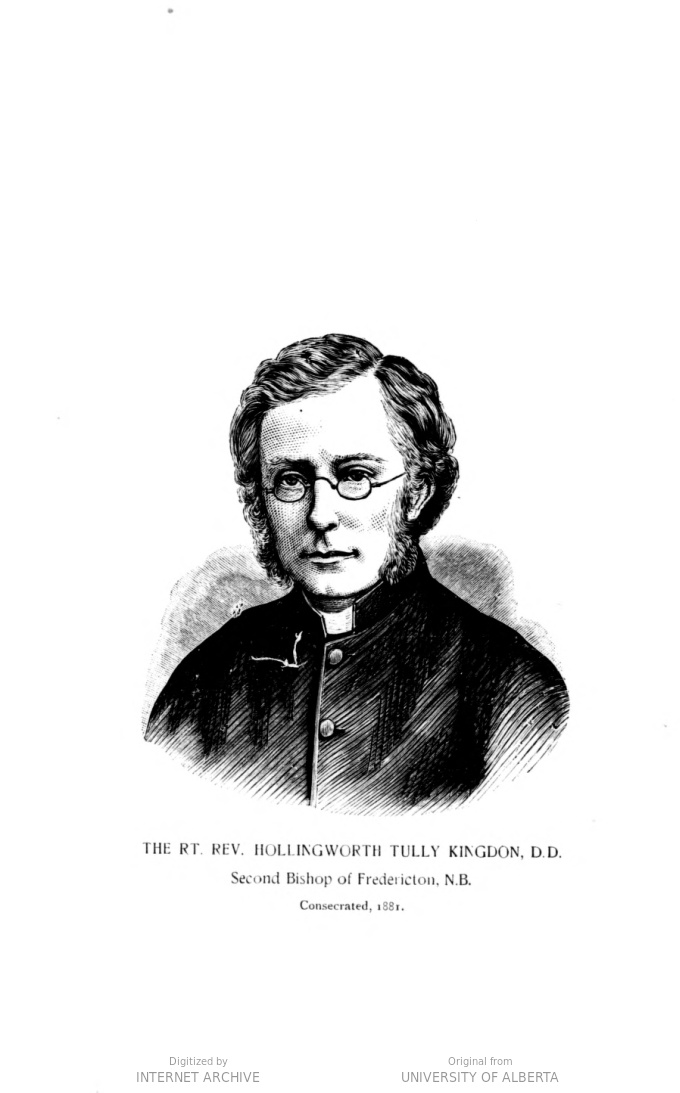
- Diocese: Diocese of Fredericton
- In office: 1892–1907
- Predecessor: John Medley
- Successor: John Richardson
- Other post: Bishop coadjutor of Fredericton (1881–1892)

Orders
- Ordination: 1859 (deacon); 1860 (priest)
- Consecration: 1881 by John Medley

Personal details
- Born: 1835 London, Great Britain
- Died: 13 October 1907 (aged 71–72)
- Denomination: Anglican
- Parents: William
- Occupation: theological author
- Education: Trinity College, Cambridge

Hollingworth Tully Kingdon (known as Tully; 1835 – 13 October 1907) was an Anglican bishop, the second Bishop of Fredericton until his death. He was also a noted author.

== Early life ==
Born in London, in 1835, the son of William Kingdon (a surgeon) and brother to James Durant Kingdon (1830–1899, a priest and headmaster), he was educated at St Paul's School, London and admitted a pensioner at Trinity College, Cambridge on 30 November 1853 (aged 19) and matriculated at Michaelmas 1854. He gained his Bachelor of Arts (BA) in 1858, proceeded Cambridge Master of Arts (MA Cantab) in 1861 and was eventually awarded a Doctor of Divinity (DD) in 1881, around the time of his episcopal ordination.

== Priestly career ==
Ordained deacon (in the Diocese of Salisbury) in 1859 and priest in 1860, he began his career with curacies in Sturminster Marshall, Dorset (1859–1863), and Devizes, Wiltshire (1863–1864), both in Salisbury diocese. From 1864 to 1869 he was Vice Principal of Salisbury Theological College and then curate (probably incumbent) of St Andrew's, Wells Street, Marylebone. He became Vicar of Good Easter, Essex from 1878 until his appointment to the episcopate.

== Episcopal career ==
On 12 January 1881, at a special Synod meeting, John Medley, Bishop of Fredericton (New Brunswick, Canada) nominated Kingdon for appointment as his coadjutor bishop — an assistant bishop with rights of succession to the diocesan See. He was duly ordained a bishop at the cathedral, Fredericton, Canada, on 10 July 1881. The chief consecrator was Medley himself, as Metropolitan of Canada; the co-consecrators were Hibbert Binney, Bishop of Nova Scotia; James Williams, Bishop of Quebec; Henry A. Neely, Bishop of Maine; and William Croswell Doane, Bishop of Albany, who preached. When Medley died in 1892, Kingdon automatically succeeded as second diocesan Bishop of Fredericton, in which post he remained til his death. He was awarded an honorary degree of Doctor of Civil Law (Hon DCL) by Trinity College, Toronto in 1893, and lived, as diocesan bishop, at Bottreaux House, Fredericton.

Anglican Communion titles
Preceded by John Medley	Bishop of Fredericton; 1892–1907	Succeeded by John Richardson
