= Snettisham Carstone Quarry =

UK Site of Special Interest

Coordinates: 52.884°N 0.503°E

- Site of Special Scientific Interest
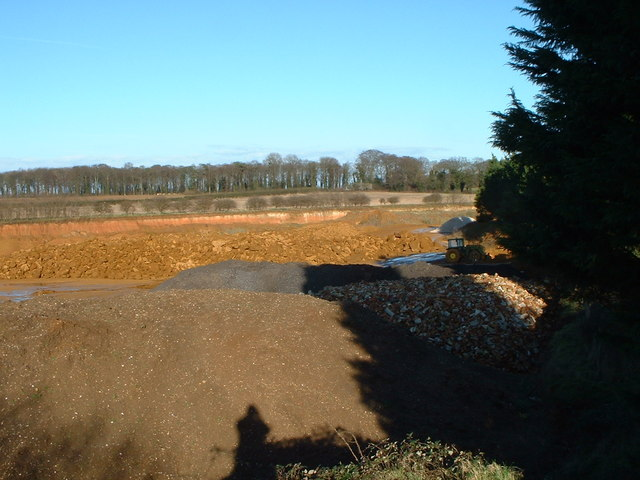
- Location of Snettisham Carstone Quarry.
- Area of search: Norfolk
- Grid reference: TF 685 348
- Interest: Biological
- Area: 11.0 hectares (27 acres)
- Notification date: 1984
- Location map: Magic Map

Snettisham Carstone Quarry is an 11-hectare (27-acre) biological Site of Special Scientific Interest located north of King's Lynn in Norfolk, England. It lies within the Norfolk Coast Area of Outstanding Natural Beauty.

The site is the only known location in Britain where the micro-moth Nothris verbascella occurs. Its host plant, hoary mullein, is abundant in parts of the quarry that are no longer worked.

The quarry remains active, and there is no public access.
