= St. Anne's Chapel (Fredericton) =

Chapel in Fredricton, New Brunswick

Coordinates: 45.9610°N 66.6482°W

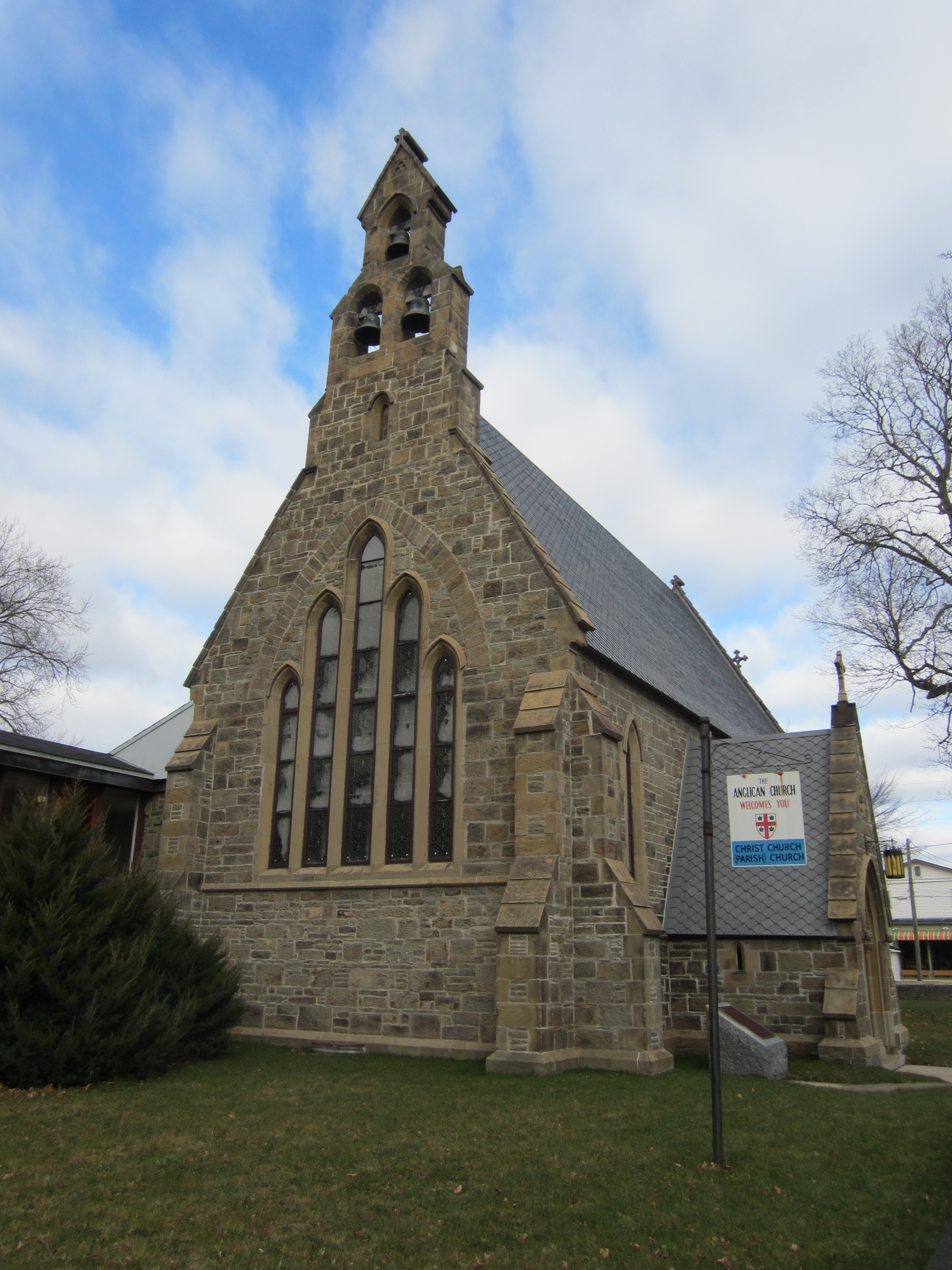
St. Anne's Chapel (Fredericton)

St. Anne's Chapel is a Gothic Revival Anglican chapel of ease in Fredericton, New Brunswick. Constructed between 1846 and 1847, it was designed by British-born architect Frank Wills. St. Anne's Chapel is a National Historic Site of Canada.

== History ==
St. Anne's Chapel was built at the direction of John Medley soon after his arrival in Canada in 1845 as the first Bishop of the Anglican Diocese of Fredericton. Its architect, Frank Wills, was brought to Canada by Bishop Medley from Exeter, England in 1846 to work on Christ Church Cathedral. Located at the corner of Westmorland and George Streets in the west end of the city, St. Anne's was intended as a chapel of ease in which services could be held until construction of the Cathedral was completed. The chapel's cornerstone was laid in May 1846 and it was consecrated on March 18, 1847. Bishop Medley himself paid most of the construction costs. Christ Church Cathedral was completed in 1853 and in 1854 the chapel became Christ Church (Parish) Church, although it continued to be commonly known as St. Anne's. With the completion next to it of a much larger church building in 1962, St. Anne's became a chapel once more. St. Anne's Chapel of Ease was declared a National Historic Site of Canada in 1989. The designation encompasses only the 1847 chapel, not the adjoining 1962 structure.

== Architectural significance ==
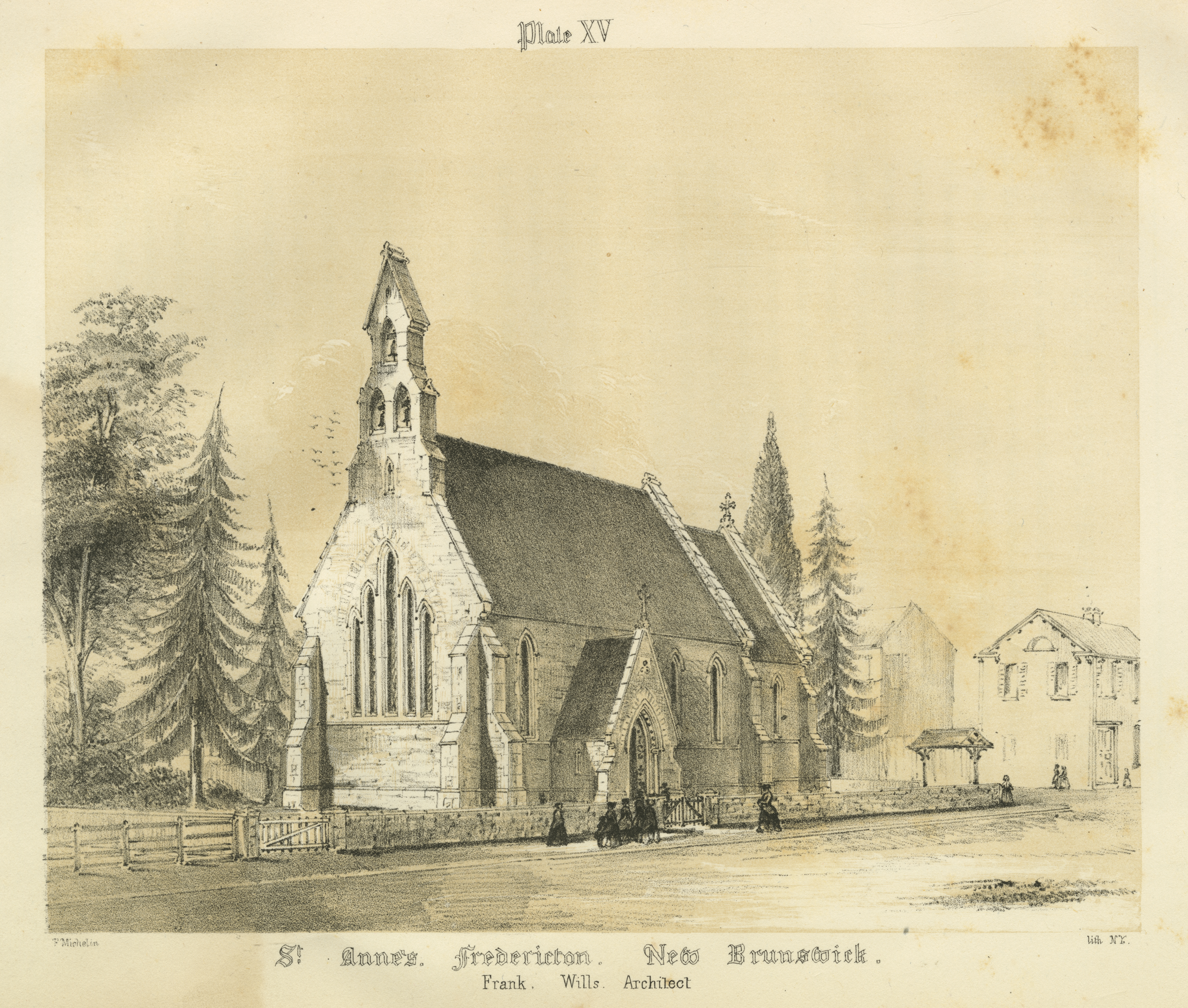
St. Anne's Chapel in 1850, three years after its completion

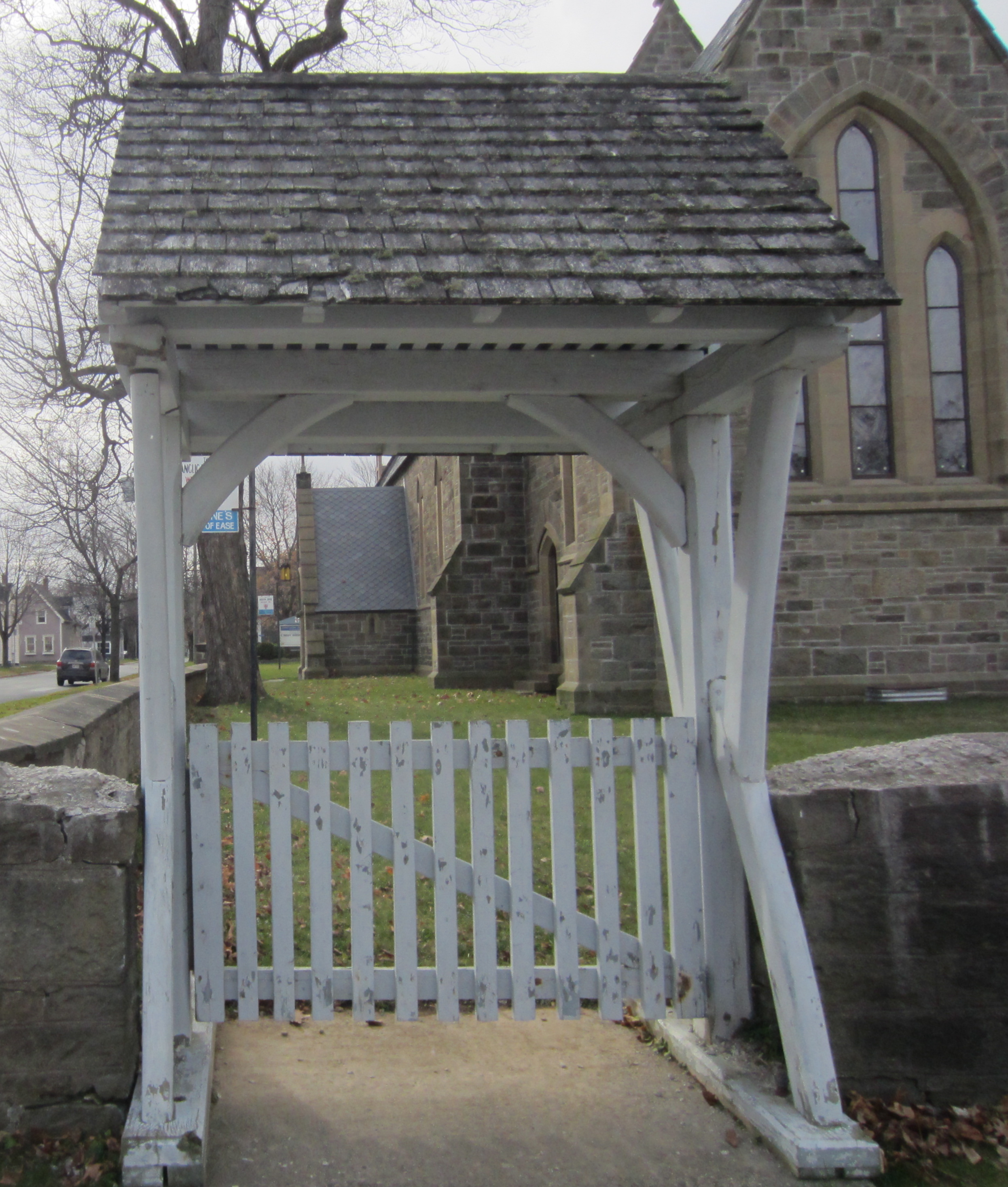
The Lychgate at St Anne's Chapel

St. Anne's Chapel was the first church in North America constructed according to the principles of the Ecclesiological Society, with which both Bishop Medley and the architect, Frank Wills, had been associated before coming to Canada. As such, it was intended by Bishop Medley to be a model for future parish churches in New Brunswick. It has been authoritatively described as the finest Gothic Revival church of its size and kind in North America.

The hammer-dressed grey sandstone building, which measures only 74 by 21 feet, comprises a nave and a chancel with a carved butternut screen. The interior roof, pulpit, altar and open bench pews are also crafted of local butternut. The interior is richly decorated, with multicoloured Minton encaustic tiles on the nave and chancel floors and the reredos. The stained glass windows in the nave were obtained from the Beer studio in Exeter, while the triplet window in the chancel was made by William Warrington of London. The entrance is through a small porch with ornate ironwork hinges and decoration on the doors. The churchyard is surrounded by a low stone wall incorporating a lychgate.

The new chapel's innovative design was controversial at the time, with some parishioners objecting to the inclusion of a chancel with a screen, which symbolically separated the priest from the laity. Also, no pew rents were charged for the open bench pews. This deprived the parish of a source of income, as well as taking away a mark of status from pew owners.
