= William Moorhead =

Canadian Anglican bishop

William Henry Moorhead (1882–1962) was the fourth Bishop of Fredericton.

He was born in Longford in Ireland, educated at Bishops University and ordained in 1912. He was a curate at St Peter, Sherbrooke then a chaplain to the CEF until 1919. He then held incumbencies at St Luke's, Grand-Mère, Quebec and St Paul, Saint John, New Brunswick until 1936 when he became Dean of Christ Church Cathedral, Fredericton.

Three years later he ascended to the episcopate, retiring in 1956.

== Notes ==
Church of England titles
Preceded by John Andrew Richardson	Bishop of Fredericton; 1939 – 1956	Succeeded by Alexander Henry O'Neil
