= Charles Schofield =

Canadian Anglican bishop

Charles de Veber Schofield (14 July 1871 – 12 July 1936) was an eminent Anglican priest in the first half of the 20th century.

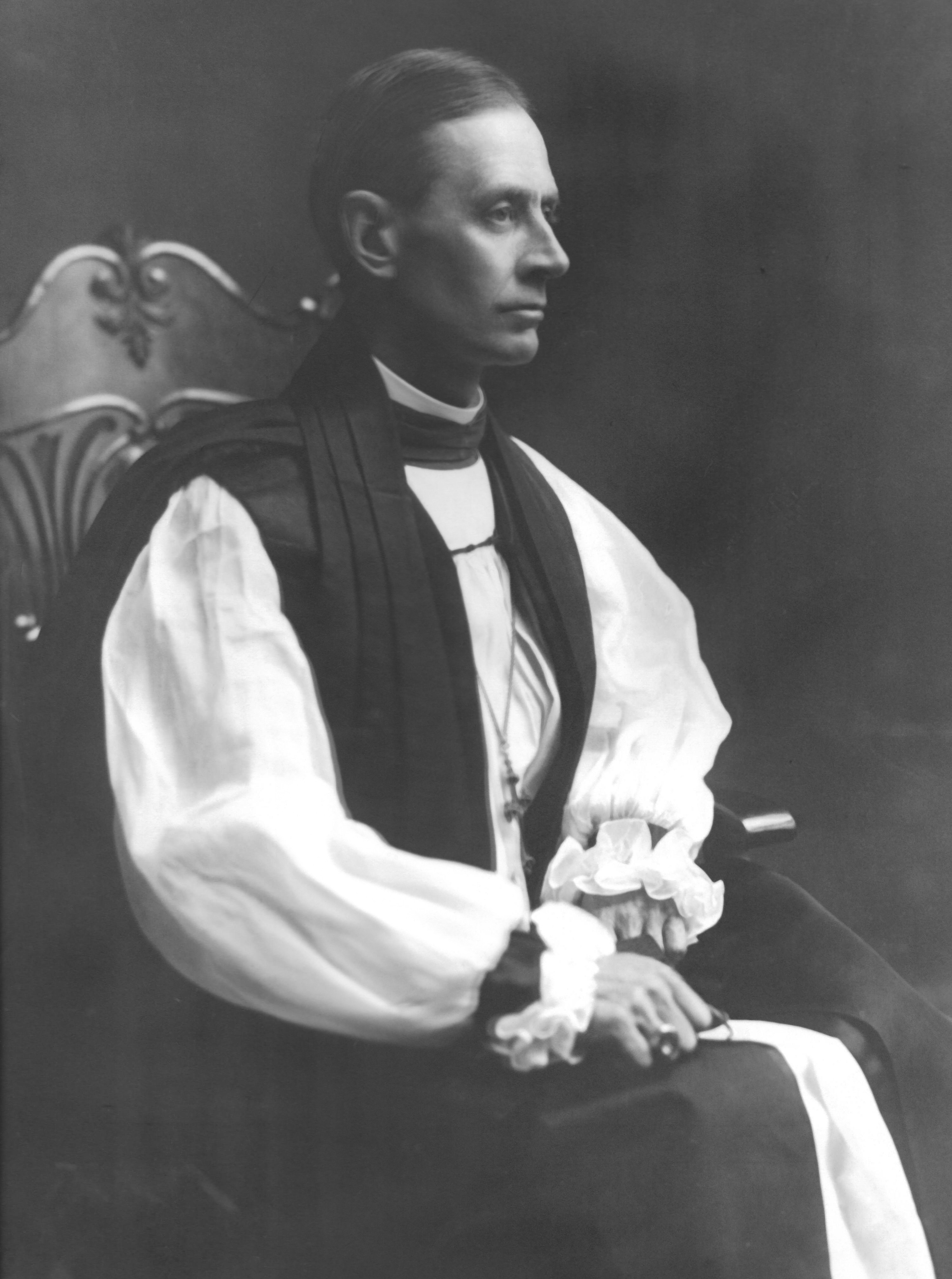
Bishop Charles D. Schofield

He was educated at Windsor, Nova Scotia and Edinburgh Theological College and ordained deacon in 1897 and priest in 1898. After a curacy at St Mary's, Portsea, Portsmouth he was Rector of Hampton, New Brunswick then Sydney, Nova Scotia. After this he was Dean of Fredericton (1907–1915) and then in 1916 Dean of Columbia, based in Victoria, British Columbia. A year later he became the Bishop of British Columbia, a position he held for twenty years. At some point, he became a Doctor of Divinity.

Anglican Communion titles
Preceded by Francis Partridge	Dean of Fredericton; 1907–1915	Succeeded by Scovil Neales
Preceded by Alexander Doull	Dean of Columbia; 1915–1916	Succeeded by Cecil S. Quainton
Preceded by Augustine Scriven	Bishop of British Columbia; 1916–1936	Succeeded by Harold Sexton
