= Hockin =

Hockin is a surname. Notable people with the surname include:

- Ben Hockin (born 1986), Paraguayan swimmer
- Bill Hockin (born 1938), Canadian Anglican bishop
- Robert Hockin (1846–1925), Canadian politician
- Tom Hockin (born 1938), Canadian politician

== See also ==
- Hockin railway station, Manitoba, Canada
- Hockinson, Washington, city in Washington State, USA
