= Obadiah Newnham =

Archdeacon of Fredericton (1848–1932)

Obadiah Samuel Newnham (23 March 1848, Leamington Hastings – 13 May 1932, St. Stephen, New Brunswick) was Archdeacon of Fredericton from 1907 until his death.

Newnham was ordained in 1875 and was a missionary at New London, PEI from 1875 to 1878. He held incumbencies at Pointe-du-Chêne, Saint John, Hampton and St Stephen. He was a Canon of Fredericton Cathedral from 1901 to 1907; and Secretary of the Diocesan Synod from 1888 until his death.
