= John Richardson (archbishop of Fredericton) =

Anglican bishop from Canada

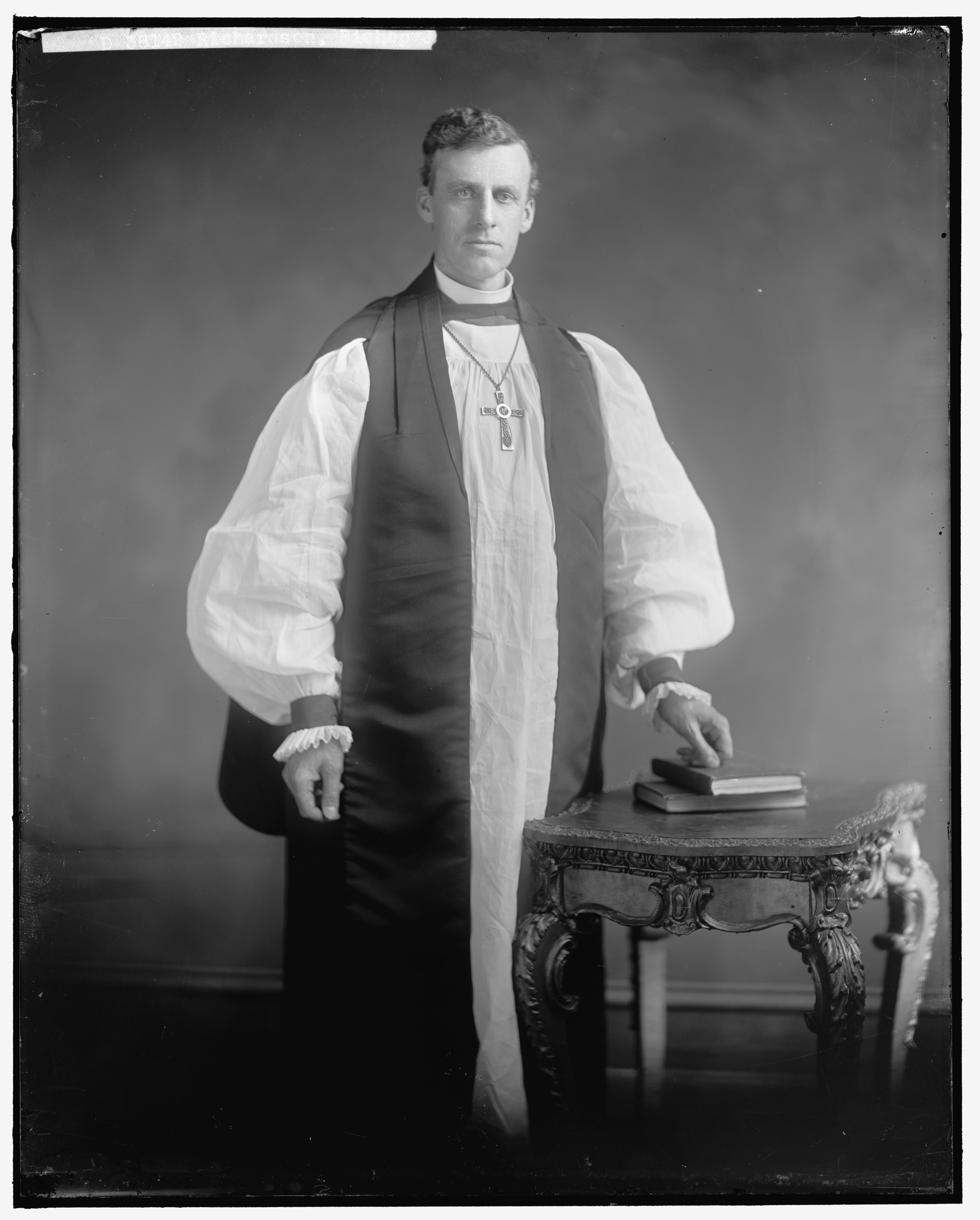
- Born: 30 October 1868
- Died: 7 October 1938 (aged 69)
- Education: St. John's College, University of Manitoba
- Church: Church of England
- Ordained: 1895
- Offices held: Bishop of Fredericton; Metropolitan of Canada

John Andrew Richardson (30 October 1868 – 7 October 1938) was the third Bishop of Fredericton and later became Metropolitan of Canada.

He was educated at Warwick School and St. John's College, University of Manitoba. Ordained in 1895, he was Rector of St Luke's, Winnipeg and then of the Parish of Saint John (Trinity Church) in Saint John, New Brunswick, before becoming Bishop Coadjutor and Dean of Fredericton in 1906. The following year he became its diocesan and in 1934 metropolitan of his province- posts he held until his death.

== Notes ==
Church of England titles
Preceded by Hollingworth Tully Kingdon	Bishop of Fredericton; 1907–1938	Succeeded by William Henry Moorhead
Preceded by Clarendon Lamb Worrell	Metropolitan of Canada; 1934–1938	Succeeded by John Hackenley
