= Christ Church Cathedral (Fredericton) =

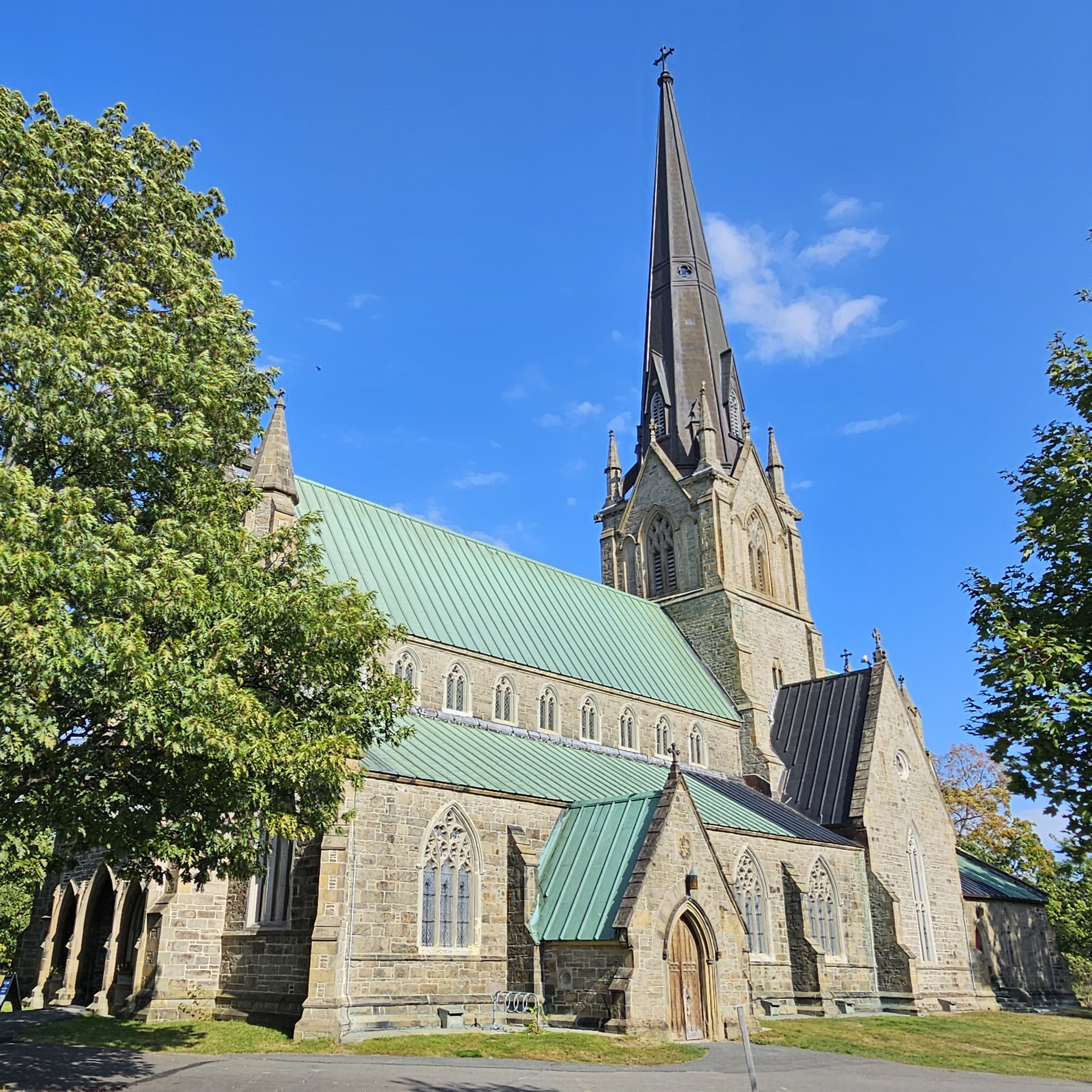
- The cathedral in 2025
- Christ Church Cathedral
- 45.95750°N 66.63496°W
- Location: 168 Church Street; Fredericton, New Brunswick; E3B 4C9
- Denomination: Anglican
- Website: cccath.ca

History
- Founded: 1845
- Founder: John Medley
- Consecrated: 1853

Architecture
- Architect(s): Frank Wills, William Butterfield
- Architectural type: Gothic Revival
- Groundbreaking: 1845
- Completed: 1853

Specifications
- Length: 172 feet (52 m)
- Width: 67 feet (20 m)
- Height: 60 feet (18 m)

Administration
- Province: Canada
- Diocese: Fredericton

Clergy
- Bishop: David Edwards
- Dean: vacant

Christ Church Cathedral is the cathedral church of the Anglican Diocese of Fredericton. It is located in Fredericton, New Brunswick, Canada. Construction of the cathedral began in 1845 and it was consecrated in 1853. The Gothic Revival cathedral is modelled after St. Mary's Church, Snettisham, Norfolk.

== History ==
=== Origin ===
The Anglican diocese of Fredericton was established in 1845, with John Medley as its first bishop. Medley was a Tractarian and a proponent of Gothic Revival architecture. As a clergyman in the Diocese of Exeter he had supervised the restoration and building of several churches according to the Gothic Revival principles of the Eccelesiological Society, and had been the founder and secretary of the Exeter Ecclesiological Society. Ecclesiology held that new church buildings should imitate those of the 13th and 14th century Decorated Gothic period, which displayed three essential characteristics lacking in Fredericton's existing wooden parish church: "reality", which meant that the building's structural elements such as rafters must be visible; a large chancel clearly separate from the congregation; and open bench seats rather than box pews.

Medley chose the 14th century St. Mary's Church in Snettisham, Norfolk as the model for the new Fredericton cathedral. Before leaving England, Medley hired the Exeter architect Frank Wills to visit St. Mary's and make detailed plans, which Medley had with him when he arrived in Fredericton on 10 June 1845.

The Ecclesiological Society's newsletter, The Ecclesiologist, took issue with Medley's choice of St. Mary's, "though magnificent as a parish church", as his model. A principal objection was that the choir roof was lower than that of the nave, which was not considered appropriate for a cathedral. In the course of construction, the roof heights were equalized, and other modifications were made either for economic reasons or because of the limited skills of local artisans. However, Medley consistently followed the ecclesiological practice of finding authority for all the architectural details in one or another existing English Gothic church.

=== Construction (1845-1853) ===
Christ Church Cathedral in the late 19th century with its original spire

Upon his consecration as Bishop of Fredericton in May 1845, the Exeter Diocesan Architectural Society gave Medley £1,500 toward the building of the cathedral, and a public meeting in Fredericton on June 23 raised a further £3,100. Medley chose a site beside the Saint John River, near the existing parish church, and was given 2.5 acres (1.0 ha) by the landowner. Site preparation work began in August, and the cornerstone was laid by Lieutenant Governor William Colebrooke on 15 October 1845.

Frank Wills, who had followed Medley to Canada, supervised the work on the cathedral. He also designed and oversaw the building of St. Anne's Chapel of Ease, which Medley had built in order to hold services while the cathedral was under construction. St. Anne's Chapel of ease was Constructed in eight months between 1846 and 1847.

The cathedral's nave and aisle walls were completed by the end of 1847, but further work was delayed by lack of funds. Bishop Medley returned to England for several months in 1848 to raise more money and to consult with the Ecclesiological Society about how to proceed, since Frank Wills had left Fredericton in early 1848 to set up an architectural practice in New York City. On the recommendation of the Ecclesiological Society, the British architect William Butterfield designed a choir and tower, and Medley succeeded in raising a further £2,000. The choir and tower were completed in 1849, Medley having changed Butterfield's design to make the choir longer and the tower higher. In 1851 Medley visited the United States and England, raising more funds and receiving donations of cathedral furnishings.

Medley himself designed the cathedral's spire, which was erected in 1851. It was a simple broach spire built of wood and covered in zinc. Medley intended the tower to be 198 feet (60 m) tall but because of doubts about the strength of the cathedral's foundation it was built 26 feet (7.9 m) shorter.

The clock in the cathedral is an exact copy of Big Ben in London. The clock dial is in the cathedral above the choir. It measures four feet in diameter. The literal clock mechanism is just above, in the tower. It was designed by Dent of London, UK and was built in 1853, later being installed in 1854. The clock still needs to be hand wound. It is currently wound by three different people on a monthly basis. The weights that drive the clock measure approximately 454 kg or 1,000 lbs and 136 kg or 300 lbs separately. A narrow spiral staircase of 51 steps must be climbed to access the room housing the clock and bell mechanisms. Then a very narrow wooden latter must be climbed to reach the 15 bells. The hour strike of the clock no longer rings. It was stopped in 2007 due to noise complaints from neighbours. However, the chimes still ring the Westminster chime to mark the quarter hours.

The 15 bells, are played by means of compressed air. The small manual sits in a closet behind the organ console. A switch under the manual turns on the air compressor in the tower. After approximately 10 to 15 seconds the bells may be played. When a key is pushed, an electronic flap opens, releasing a shot of compressed air into the chamber underneath the bell cable and eventually pulling the clapper of the bell to ring it. The bells are stationary. The clapper inside the bell is pulled over to one side of the bell and is moved just slightly to ring it. The system is called a chime of bells. As of August 2019, only four other churches in Canada use the same method of ringing their bells. One of those churches is Trinity Anglican Church in Saint John, New Brunswick.

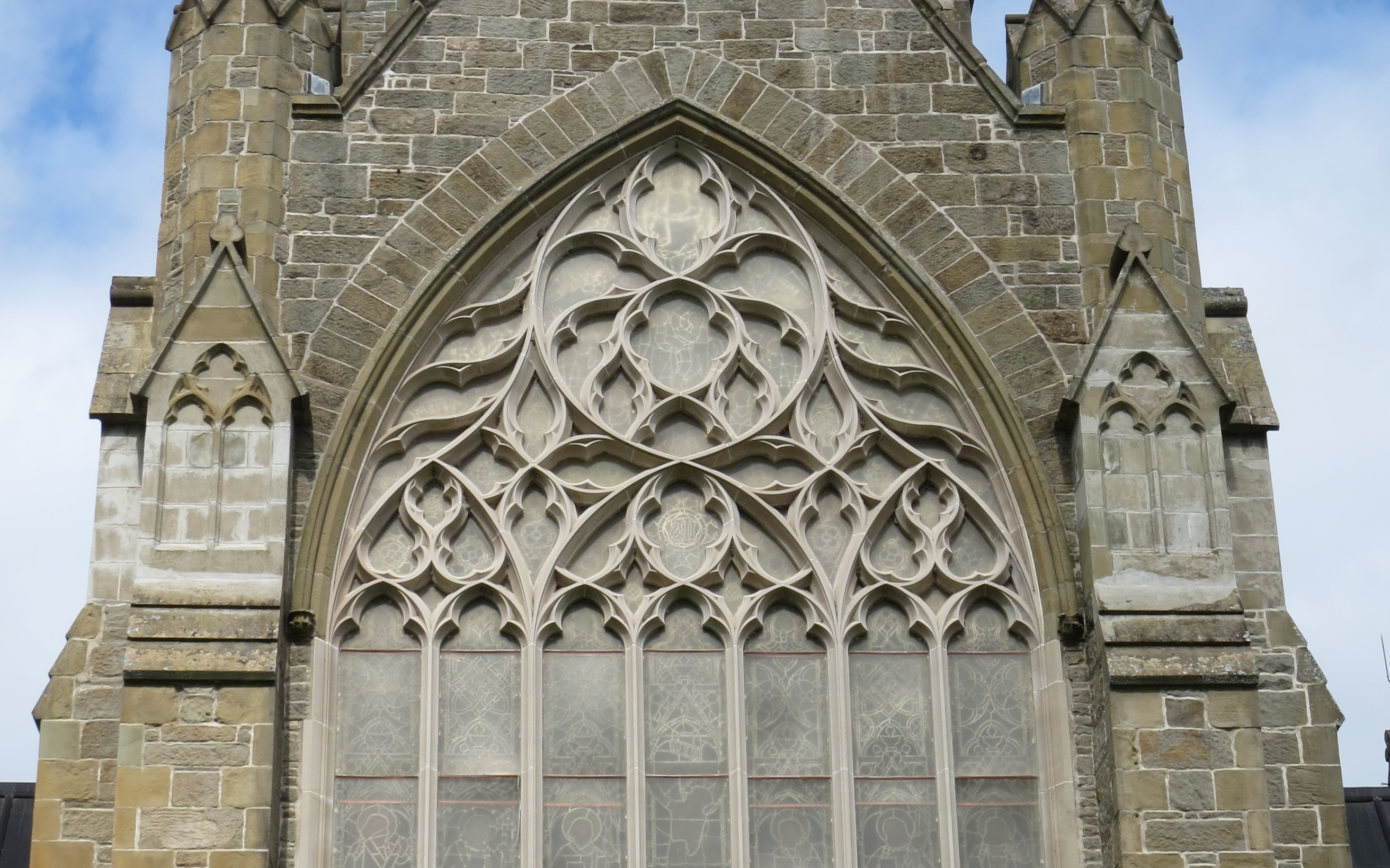
Tracery in the east window of Christ Church Cathedral, Fredericton

Most of the cathedral's stained glass windows were installed between 1850 and 1852. The east window is by William Wailes. Its tracery is a copy of that in the east window of Selby Abbey, and its seven panels depict Christ and six of his apostles. It was jointly donated by Wailes and by New York City's Trinity Episcopal Church.

The west window, by William Warrington, is a "virtual likeness" of the west window of St. Mary's, Snettisham, which Warrington had restored in 1846. The Beer studio of Exeter supplied the aisle windows, most of which are also copies of those at Snettisham.

The clerestory windows are copies of those at Exeter Cathedral. On either side of the west window, sit two smaller windows. They were installed in 1879 and are the only two windows in the cathedral made with gold dust. The final window installed in the cathedral was installed in 1908 and sits in the choir vestry. It has a similar design to a 14th-century church stained glass window.

=== Fire and restoration (1911-1912) ===
The cathedral was struck by lightning on 3 July 1911, causing a fire that completely destroyed the spire. The cathedral's eight bells melted and the organ and much of the furniture, which had been designed by William Butterfield, were destroyed. During the restoration the foundation was reinforced and the spire was rebuilt to the height of 198 feet (60 m) as Medley had intended. The financier James Hamet Dunn replaced the bells, and added seven more. 2,671 new organ pipes were installed in the north transept in 1912. The cathedral was rededicated on 24 August 1912. Of note, the only aspect of the tower saved, was the clock. Erected by Dent Co. of London, UK in 1853.

=== 1990s restoration and 2006 fire ===
In the 1990s the cathedral underwent a $2.5 million restoration consisting of refacing its stonework, repointing tracery, cleaning its woodwork, refinishing of pews and shoring up the masonry on the east end. The copper plating and a new cross were installed on the spire in 1995.

A fire in the bell tower on 6 August 2006 activated the sprinkler system, causing water damage to the choir area. Complete repairs took several months, during which the cathedral was closed.

=== National Historic Site of Canada ===
The cathedral was designated a National Historic Site of Canada in 1983. According to the Historic Sites and Monuments Board it is "one of the best examples of ecclesiological Gothic Revival architecture in Canada and it established an architectural pattern followed in the design of many large and small churches in 19th-century Canada".

== Music ==
The four-manual Casavant Frères organ console was built in 1957 and renovated in 1981. It replaced an instrument which was built in 1912 after the fire. The console is identified as Opus 2399.

There are two choirs: an adult choir which provides music for the principal Sunday worship and monthly evensong; and a contemporary choir and band which sings at the Sunday morning (informal) contemporary worship. J. Thomas D. Gonder is the current organist and director of music.

== Governance ==
The cathedral has a congregation, which acts in many ways like a parish, but it does not exist within the diocese as a parish. Christ Church Cathedral, Fredericton is the only Cathedral in Canada that is not itself a parish. A cathedral by-law defines the operation of the corporation and its governance. While it exists within the geographical boundary of the Parish of Fredericton, parish lands of downtown Fredericton belong to the Corporation of the Parish of Fredericton (Christ Church (Parish) Church and St. Anne's Chapel). St. Anne's is the former Chapel of Ease constructed by Bishop Medley upon the demolition of the original parish church on the present cathedral site. As a community, the cathedral is governed by the "Bishop and Chapter" whose function is similar to a parish corporation (incumbent, church wardens and vestry) and that of the usual "chapter" of other cathedrals. There are congregational representatives on bishop and chapter elected by the congregation along with other members appointed by the bishop of Fredericton.

== Clergy ==
The dean and incumbent is the only stipendiary cleric currently associated with the Cathedral. Several members of staff assist the dean in its ministry. including the director of music (half-time), office administrator (four-fifths-time), director of Christian formation (half-time), sexton (full-time), and a verger (by honorarium). There are retired clergy who serve as honorary assistants.

The canons of the cathedral chapter typically do not have a liturgical or governance role at the cathedral, unlike other foundations. In the Diocese of Fredericton, these positions are largely honorary rather than collegiate to the Cathedral itself.

The first dean of Fredericton was Francis Partridge. The incumbency has been vacant since August 2026.

Deans of Fredericton

- Geoffrey M. Hall
- Keith R. Joyce
- William J. Hockin
- John vanNostrand Wright
- Donald W. Noseworthy
- H. Rhodes Cooper
- Harold L. Nutter
- Spencer C. Gray
- W. H. Moorhead
- J. F. H. Holmes
- Scovil Neales
- Charles D. Schofield
- Francis Partridge
