= Spencer Gray (priest) =

Spencer Cyril Gray (1890 in Tottenham – 1981 in Fredericton) was Dean of Fredericton from 1939 to 1960.

He was educated at East London College, and then at St Chad's College, Regina and ordained in 1914. After a curacy at St Peter's Qu'Appelle he held incumbencies in Yellow Grass, McLeod, Burton, Stanley and Woodstock before being appointed Archdeacon of Fredericton in 1939.
