= George Lemmon =

Canadian Anglican bishop (1932–2022)

George Colborne Lemmon (20 March 1932 – 22 May 2022) was a Canadian priest who served as the seventh Bishop of Fredericton.

After an earlier career as a Linotype operator he studied for a Bachelor of Arts (BA) at the University of New Brunswick, and a Master of Divinity at Wycliffe College in the University of Toronto. He was ordained in 1963 by the Rt. Rev. A.H. O'Neill, Bishop of Fredericton and began his career at Canterbury, New Brunswick. He later held incumbencies at Wilmot, Peel, Renforth, Sackville and Christ Church, Fredericton.

Lemmon died on 22 May 2022, at the age of 90.

Church of England titles
Preceded by Harold Nutter	Bishop of Fredericton; 1989–2000	Succeeded by Bill Hockin
