= Henry O'Neil (bishop) =

Canadian Anglican bishop

Alexander Henry O’Neil (23 July 1907 – 21 October 1997) was the 5th Bishop of Fredericton and later the 13th Metropolitan of Canada.
He was educated at The University of Western Ontario and ordained in 1930. He was Principal at Huron College then General Secretary of The British and Foreign Bible Society. He was consecrated Bishop on 25 January 1957 and became Metropolitan of Canada in 1963; and retired from both posts in 1971.

Church of England titles
Preceded by William Henry Moorhead	Bishop of Fredericton; 1957–1971	Succeeded by Harold Lee Nutter
Preceded by John Harkness Dixon	Metropolitan of Canada; 1963–1971	Succeeded by William Davis
