= Rhodes Cooper =

Canadian dean (1925–2009)

Harry Rhodes Cooper (1925–2009) was Dean of Fredericton from 1972 until 1983.

He was educated at the University of King's College and ordained in 1949. After a curacy at All Saints Cathedral, Halifax he held incumbencies at New Waterford, Nova Scotia and St. John's, Newfoundland and Labrador before being appointed Dean in 1972.

He died on 22 January 2009
