= Snettisham =

Village in Norfolk, England

Coordinates: 52°52′37″N 0°30′09″E

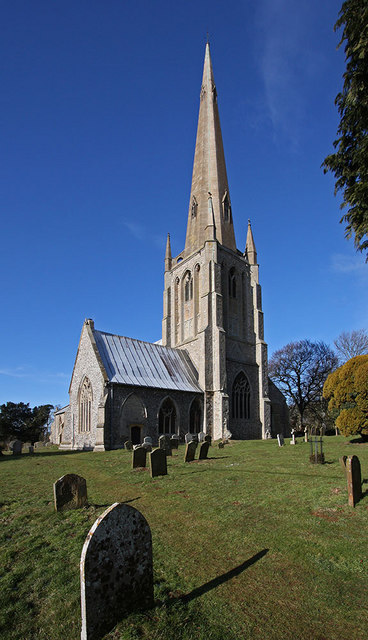
- St Mary's Church, Snettisham "perhaps the most exciting Decorated church in Norfolk"

- Location within Norfolk
- Area: 28.03 km^{2} (10.82 sq mi)
- Population: 2,570 (2011)
  - Density: 92/km^{2} (240/sq mi)
- OS grid reference: TF685340
- Civil parish: Snettisham
- District: King's Lynn and West Norfolk
- Shire county: Norfolk
- Region: East
- Country: England
- Sovereign state: United Kingdom
- Post town: KING'S LYNN
- Postcode district: PE31
- Police: Norfolk
- Fire: Norfolk
- Ambulance: East of England
- UK Parliament: North West Norfolk

Snettisham is a village and civil parish in the English county of Norfolk. It is located near the west coast of Norfolk, some 5 miles (8.0 km) south of the seaside resort of Hunstanton, 9 miles (14 km) north of the town of King's Lynn and 45 miles (72 km) northwest of the city of Norwich.

In local dialect it may be pronounced "Snettsham", or "Snettsum" (the emphasis is placed upon the vowel in the first syllable); "Snettshum"

== Etymology ==
The village's name means 'Snaet's/Sneti's homestead/village'.

== Geographical and historical overview ==
The civil parish has an area of 28.03 km^{2} (10.82 sq mi) and in the 2001 census had a population of 2374 in 1097 households. For the purposes of local government, the parish falls within the district of King's Lynn and West Norfolk. The population of the civil parish had increased to 2,570 by 2011 and to 2,710 by 2021.

St Mary's Church in the village has a 172-foot (52 m) high spire, a landmark for ships in The Wash. The church is a Grade I listed building. Nikolaus Pevsner called it "perhaps the most exciting 14th-century Decorated church in Norfolk". It served as the model for Christ Church Cathedral in Fredericton, New Brunswick, Canada, built 1845–1853.

The Snettisham coast is often said to be "where Norfolk stares at Lincolnshire". This is because, unlike much of Norfolk's coast where the sea stretches to the horizon, Snettisham looks across the square-mouthed estuary of The Wash at the county of Lincolnshire, only 15 miles (24 km) away. Snettisham RSPB reserve, on the coast of The Wash some 2 miles (3.2 km) to the west of the village, is a nature reserve in the care of the Royal Society for the Protection of Birds. It consists of bird lagoons and bird-observation hides, including a rotary hide.

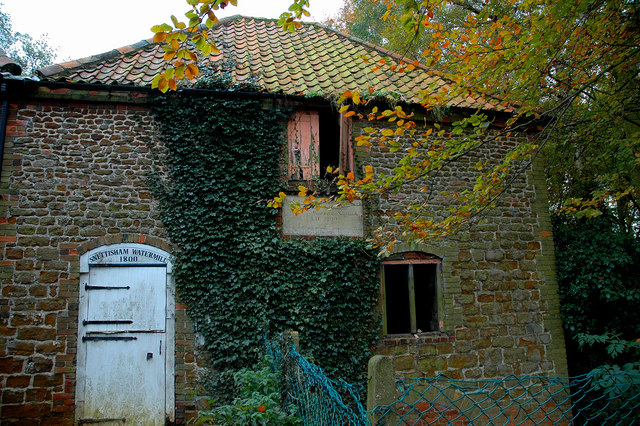
The old watermill in 2005

The River Ingol runs to the south of the village, upon which stands Snettisham watermill, now renovated as a holiday let. This was built in 1800 for £800 and it was paid for by the community of Snettisham for the people of the village at a time when bread was scarce. It is believed that the present mill was built on an existing site although virtually no records have so far been found apart that Thomas Stonne was a Snettisham miller in 1626. At the time of Domesday, there were seven mills in Snettisham more than in any other Norfolk village. The mill is very small and originally consisted of a single structure built of local dark brown carrstone with a pantiled roof. The mill worked on until 1940 producing flour and after that was used for animal feed production until 1960. The mill was restored, and brought back to working order by 1984.

Though traces of Snettisham railway station and the railway line can still be seen, the service, which opened in 1862, was terminated in 1969.

The Snettisham Hoard is a series of discoveries of Iron Age precious metal, including nearly 180 gold torcs, 75 complete and the rest fragmentary, found in the area between 1948 and 1973 at Ken Hill. In 1985 there was also a find of Romano-British jewellery and raw materials buried in a clay pot in AD 155, the Snettisham Jeweller's Hoard. Although this latter find has no direct connection with the nearby Iron Age finds, it may be evidence of a long tradition of gold- and silver-working in the area.

Snettisham has a complex entry in the Domesday Book of 1086, where it is divided in ownership between William de Warenne and the Bishop of Bayeux. Related berewicks are West Newton and Castle Rising and Weston Longville is said to be in Snettisham's valuation. The name of the manor is spelt in four different ways, two very similar to the present pronunciation, one of Snesham and one of Nestesham.

In 2024 Snettisham received national attention on account of its feral chicken population. Residents reportedly had mixed views about the birds.

== Governance ==
An electoral ward of the same name exists and had a population of 4,032 at the 2011 Census.

== Notable people ==
Ian Campbell (1945-2009), Apothecary to the Household at Sandringham, was based in Snettisham

== See also ==
- Carrstone
- Snettisham Carstone Quarry
- Wild Ken Hill

== Gallery ==
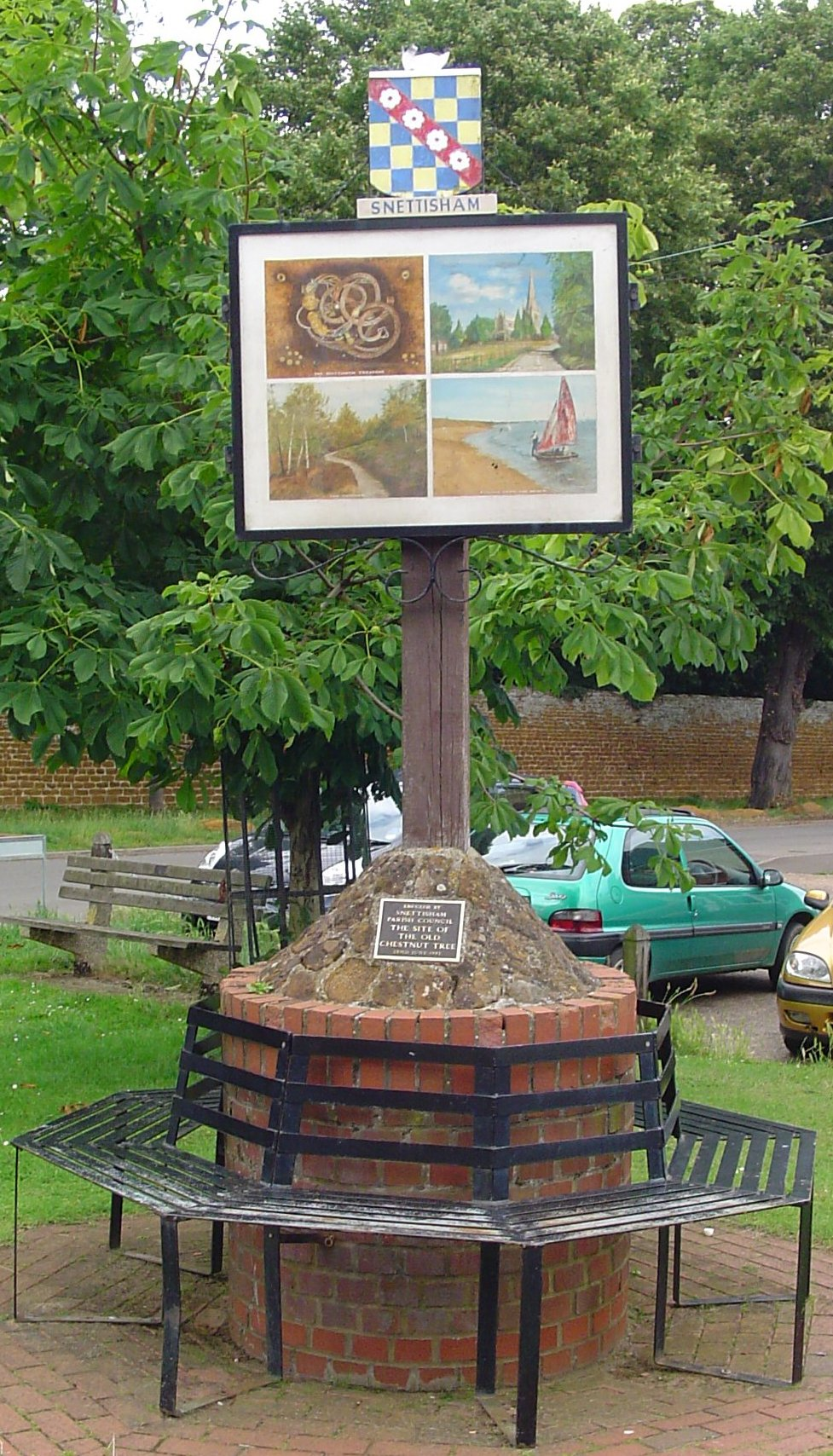
Bench and signpost in Snettisham

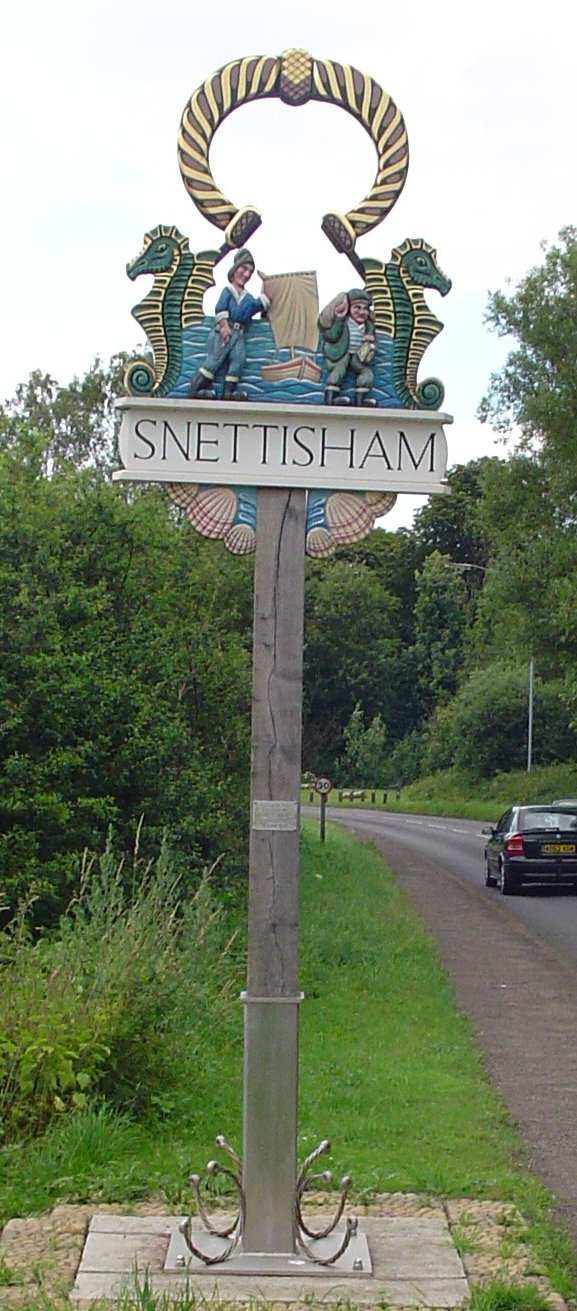
Village sign

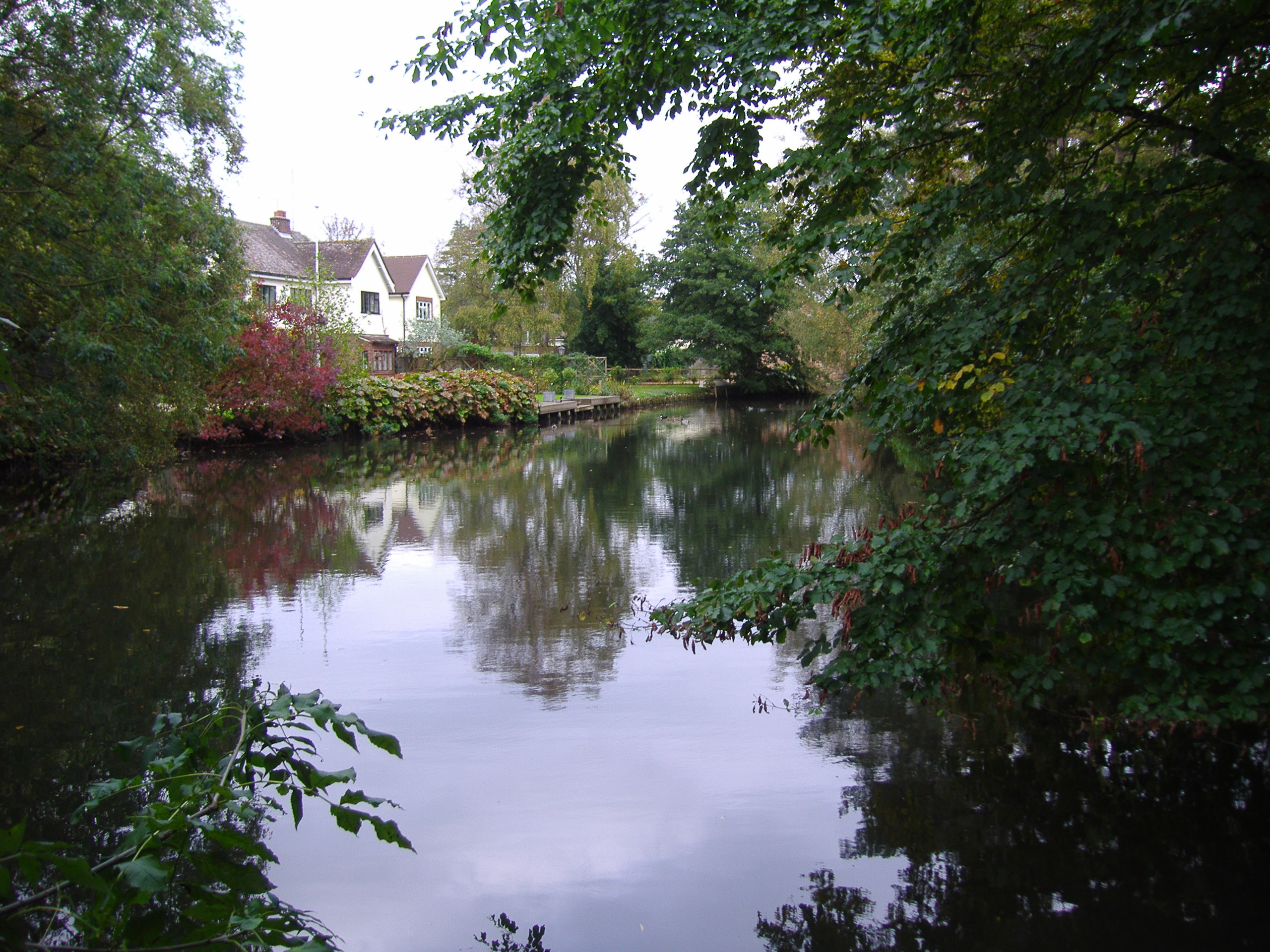
Mill Pond on the River Ingol
