= Augustine Scriven =

Canadian Anglican bishop

Augustine Scriven (1852 – 21 July 1916) was an eminent Anglican priest in the last decades of the nineteenth century and the first two of the twentieth.

He was born in Spernall, Sambourne, Warwickshire and educated at St Mary Hall, Oxford and ordained in 1875. After curacies at Kirkham and Frindsbury he held incumbencies at Martinhoe and St Peter, Rochester. In 1884 he became Archdeacon of Vancouver a post he held until his appointment to the episcopate as Bishop of British Columbia in 1915.

Anglican Communion titles
Preceded by Charles Roper	Bishop of British Columbia; 1915–1916	Succeeded by Charles Schofield
