= Harold Nutter =

Canadian Anglican bishop

Harold Lee Nutter CM, (29 December 1923 – 9 September 2017) was the 6th Bishop of Fredericton and later the 16th Metropolitan of Canada.

He was born on December 29, 1923, educated at Mount Allison University and ordained Deacon in 1946 and Priest the following year. Later he held incumbencies in Simonds and Upham, Woodstock, New Brunswick then St Mark, Saint John, New Brunswick. In 1960 he was appointed Dean of Fredericton. Eleven years later he became the area's diocesan and in 1980 metropolitan of his province- posts he held until 1989.

He died on September 9, 2017.

Church of England titles
Preceded by Alexander Henry O’Neil	Bishop of Fredericton; 1971– 1989	Succeeded by George Colborne Lemmon
Preceded by Robert Seaborn	Metropolitan of Canada; 1980–1989	Succeeded by Reginald Hollis
