= Dean of Fredericton =

The Dean of Fredericton is an Anglican dean in the Anglican Diocese of Fredericton of the Ecclesiastical Province of Canada, based at Christ Church Anglican Cathedral in Fredericton.

The incumbents have been :

Tenure	Incumbent	Notes	Ref
1895–1906	Francis Partridge	(1846–1906), 1st Dean of Fredericton
1906–1907	John A. Richardson (Acting Dean?)	(1868–1938) (Bishop of Fredericton, 1907)
1907–1915	Charles Schofield	(1871–1936), afterwards Dean of Columbia, 1915 and Bishop of British Columbia, 1916
1915–1932	Scovil Neales	(1864–1936)
1937–1960	Spencer Gray
1960–1971	Harold Nutter	(1923–2017), afterwards Bishop of Fredericton, 1971
1972–1986	Rhodes Cooper	(1925–2009)
1986–1996	John Wright	(1942–2024) afterwards Dean of Columbia, 1996
1996–1998	William Hockin	(1938–), afterwards coadjutor Bishop of Fredericton, 1998
1999–2014	Keith Joyce	(1952–)
2014–2026	Geoffrey Hall	(1961–)
