= Diocese of Fredericton =

Diocese of the Anglican Church in Canada

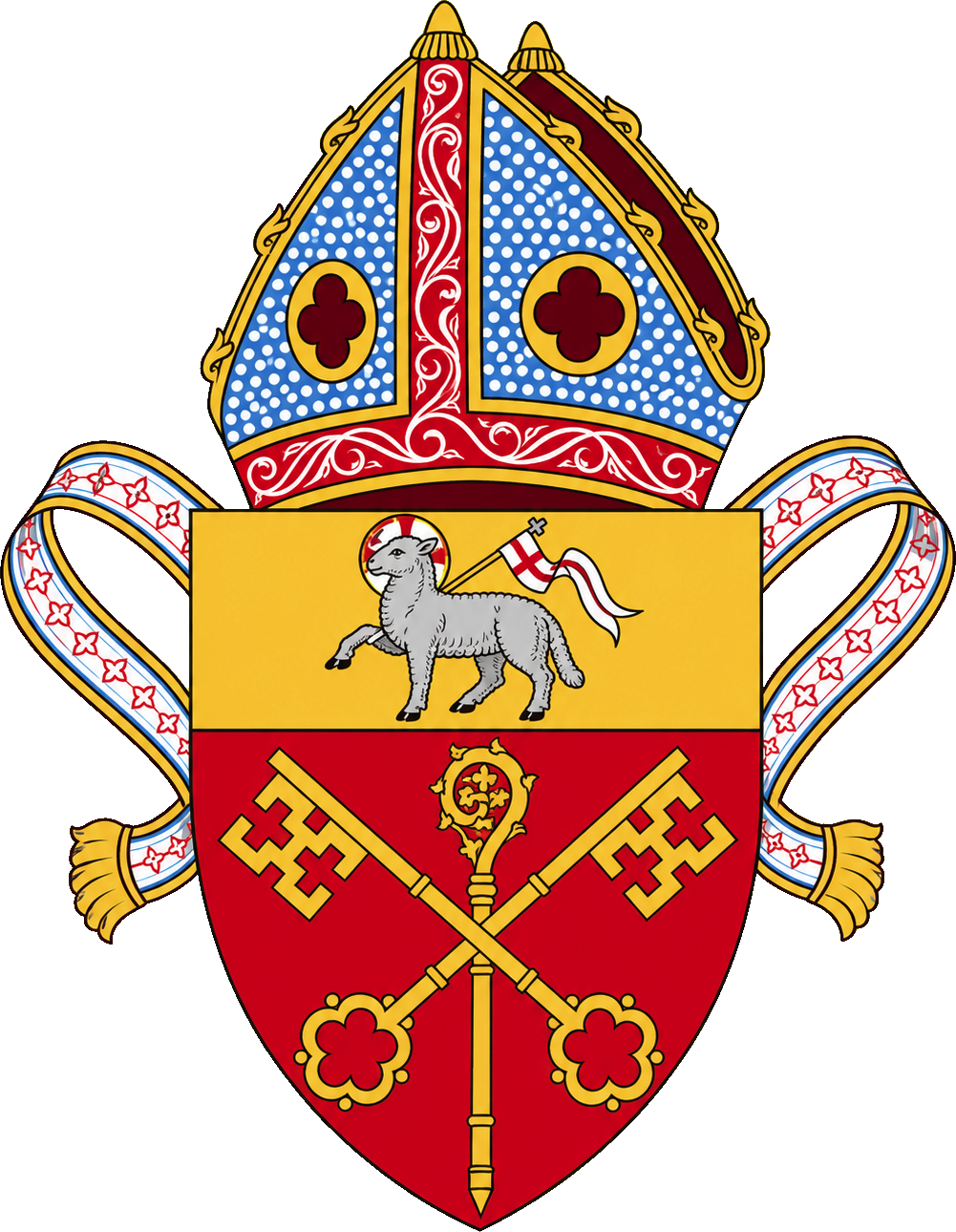

Location
- Ecclesiastical province: Canada

Statistics
- Parishes: 72 (2022)
- Members: 9,823 (2022)

Information
- Rite: Anglican
- Cathedral: Christ Church Cathedral, Fredericton, New Brunswick, Canada

Current leadership
- Bishop: David Edwards

Map
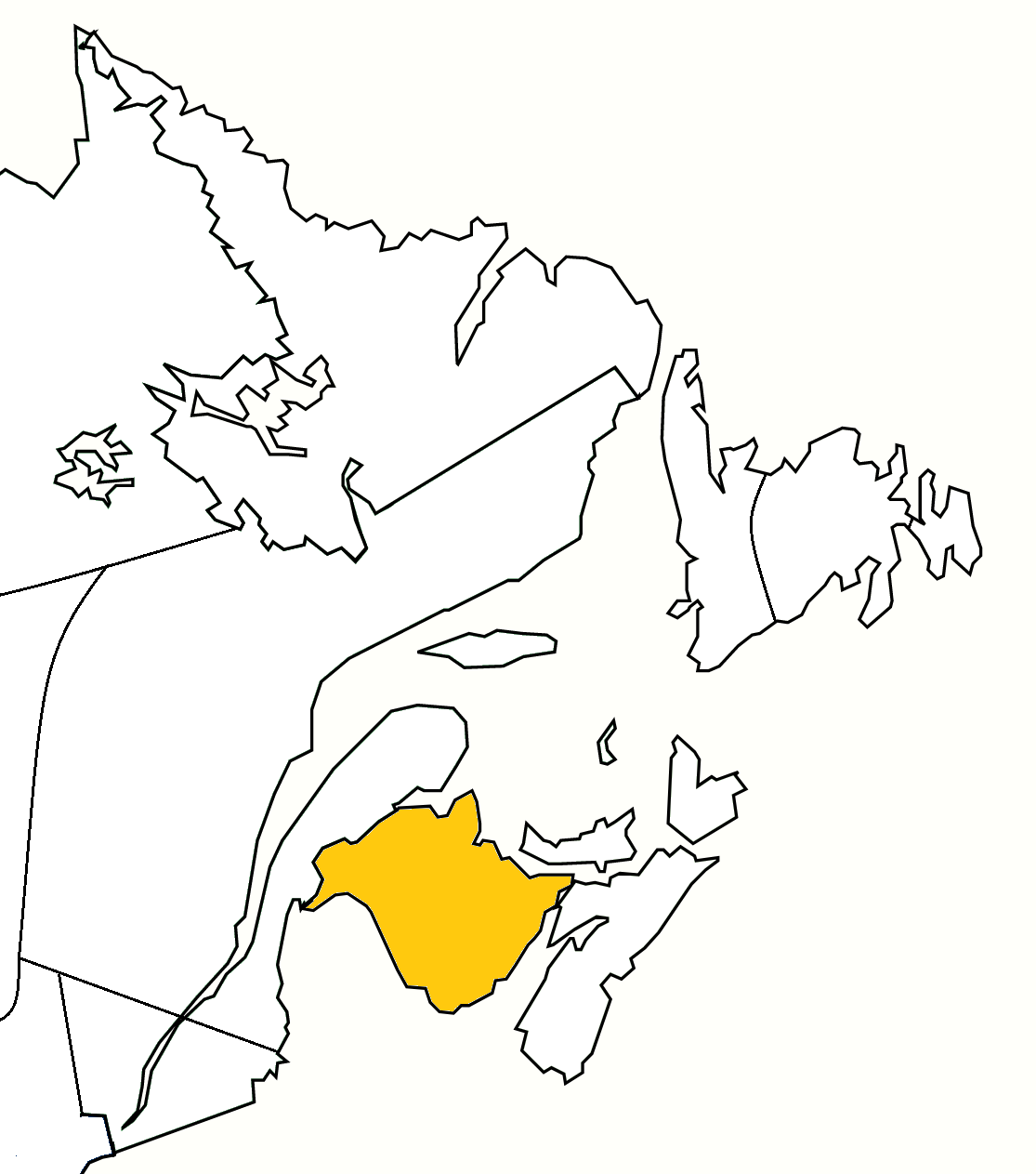
- Boundaries of the diocese within the Ecclesiastical Province of Canada

Website
- nb.anglican.ca

The Diocese of Fredericton is a diocese of the Ecclesiastical Province of Canada of the Anglican Church of Canada. Established in 1845, its first bishop was John Medley, who served until his death on September 9, 1892. Its cathedral and diocesan offices are in Fredericton, New Brunswick, Canada.

== Bishops ==
- 1845–1892: John Medley; Metropolitan of Canada, 1879–1892
- 1892–1907: Tully Kingdon
- 1907–1938: John Richardson; Metropolitan of Canada, 1934–1938
- 1939–1956: William Moorhead
- 1957–1971: Henry O'Neil
- 1971–1989: Harold Nutter; Metropolitan of Canada, 1980–1989
- 1989–2000: George Lemmon
- 2000–2003: Bill Hockin
- 2003–2014: Claude Miller; Metropolitan of Canada, 2009–2014
- 2014–present: David Edwards; Metropolitan of Canada, 2020–Present

== Archdeacons ==
The following have served as archdeacons of the diocese:

Archdeacons of St. Andrews

- 2001–2003: Geoffrey Hall
- 2014–present: John Matheson

Archdeacons of Chatham

- 2018–2020: Sandy MacPherson
- 2020–present: Perry Cooper

Archdeacons of Fredericton

George Best held this post 1825–1829 in the Diocese of Nova Scotia, before the erection of Fredericton diocese; Best and Coster were archdeacons for all New Brunswick, and as such were also called Archdeacon of New Brunswick.

- 1829 – ?: George Coster
- in 1866, there was one archdeaconry and it was vacant
- 1907–1932: Obadiah Newnham
- –2016: Patricia Drummond
- 2017–2020: Wandlyn Snelgrove
- 2020–2023: Kevin Stockall
- 2023–2024: Paul Ranson

Archdeacons of Kingston and the Kennebecasis

- 2002-2006: Richard McConnell
- 2006-2015: David Barrett
- 2015–present: Robert Marsh

Archdeacons of Moncton

- 2006-2014 Richard McConnell
- 2014–present: Brent Ham

Archdeacons of Saint John

- 2016–2017: Stuart Allan
- 2018–2022: Keith Osborne
- 2022–present: Leo Martin

Archdeacons of Woodstock

- 2014–2017: Patricia Drummond
- 2018–2020: Roderick Black
- 2023-2025: Shawn C. Branch (Bishop's Liaison)
- 2025-present: Maria Shepherdson

Diocesan Archdeacons

- ?-2000: Harold Hazen
- 1998-2003: Claude Miller
- 2003-2014: Geoffrey Hall
- 2014–2024: Cathy Laskey
- 2025-present: Shawn C. Branch as Director of Mission & Ministry

== See also ==
- Dean of Fredericton
