= Francis Partridge =

Anglican priest (1846–1906)

Francis Partridge (b Dursley, Gloucestershire, England 1846 – d Fredericton, New Brunswick, Canada 1906) was an Anglican priest in Canada during the last decades of the Nineteenth century and the first of the 20th.

Educated at Katharine Lady Berkeley's School and St Augustine's College, Canterbury he emigrated to Canada in 1868 and became Headmaster of the Grammar School at St. Andrews, New Brunswick, a post he held until 1872. He was Rector of Rothesay, New Brunswick from then until 1879 when he was appointed a Canon of Christ Church Cathedral, Fredericton. He was Rector of St George's, Halifax, Nova Scotia from 1881 until 1895, also holding the position of Lecturer in Apologetics at the University of King's College beginning in 1886. In 1895 he became the first Dean of Fredericton; and died in post on 18 April 1906.
