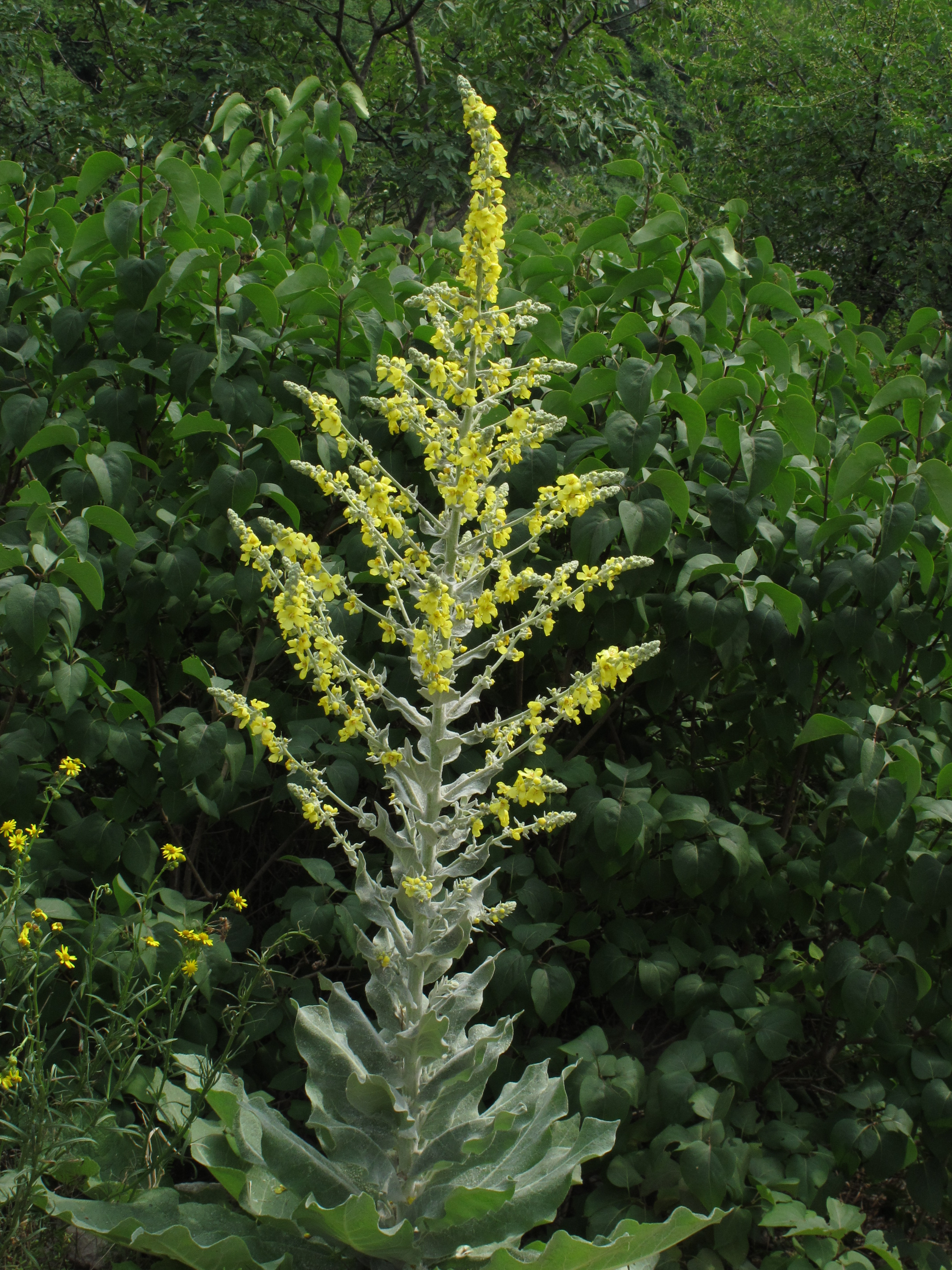
- Plant in flower in Italy

Scientific classification
- Kingdom: Plantae
- Clade: Embryophytes
- Clade: Tracheophytes
- Clade: Angiosperms
- Clade: Eudicots
- Clade: Asterids
- Order: Lamiales
- Family: Scrophulariaceae
- Genus: Verbascum
- Species: V. pulverulentum

Binomial name
- Verbascum pulverulentum Vill.

Synonyms
- List: Lychnitis pulverulenta (Vill.) Fourr.; Thapsus floccosum (Waldst. & Kit.) Raf.; Thapsus pulverulentum (Vill.) Raf.; Verbascum acutifolium Halácsy; Verbascum farinosum Pourr. ex Willk. & Lange; Verbascum floccosum Waldst. & Kit.; Verbascum haemorrhoidale Aiton; Verbascum heterophyllum Moretti; Verbascum laxiflorum C.Presl; Verbascum pulvinatum Thuill.

= Verbascum pulverulentum =

Species of flowering plant

Verbascum pulverulentum, the hoary mullein, is a species of flowering plant in the family Scrophulariaceae. It is native to western, central and southern Europe north to England (where its main range is in East Anglia) and southern Wales. It has been introduced to Austria, Madeira, and Washington state in the US. It is a specialist on coastal shingle, and so is preadapted to human-influenced habitats such as old quarries and gravel pits, road verges, railway embankments, and similar disturbed stony ground.

It is a stout biennial or monocarpic perennial herb growing up to 1.5 m (4 ft 11 in) tall, producing flowers and seeds only once, during its second or a later year. The stems and leaves are densely woolly with pale grey to glaucous pubescence. The flowers are yellow, 18–25 mm diameter, with 5 orange stamens, all the stamen stems with dense white hairs. It can best be distinguished from the similar great mullein (V. thapsus) in all five stamens having dense white hairs on the stem; in V. thapsus, the lower two of the five stamens are hairless or only thinly hairy.

It is the main food plant for the moth Nothris verbascella (Norfolk snout).

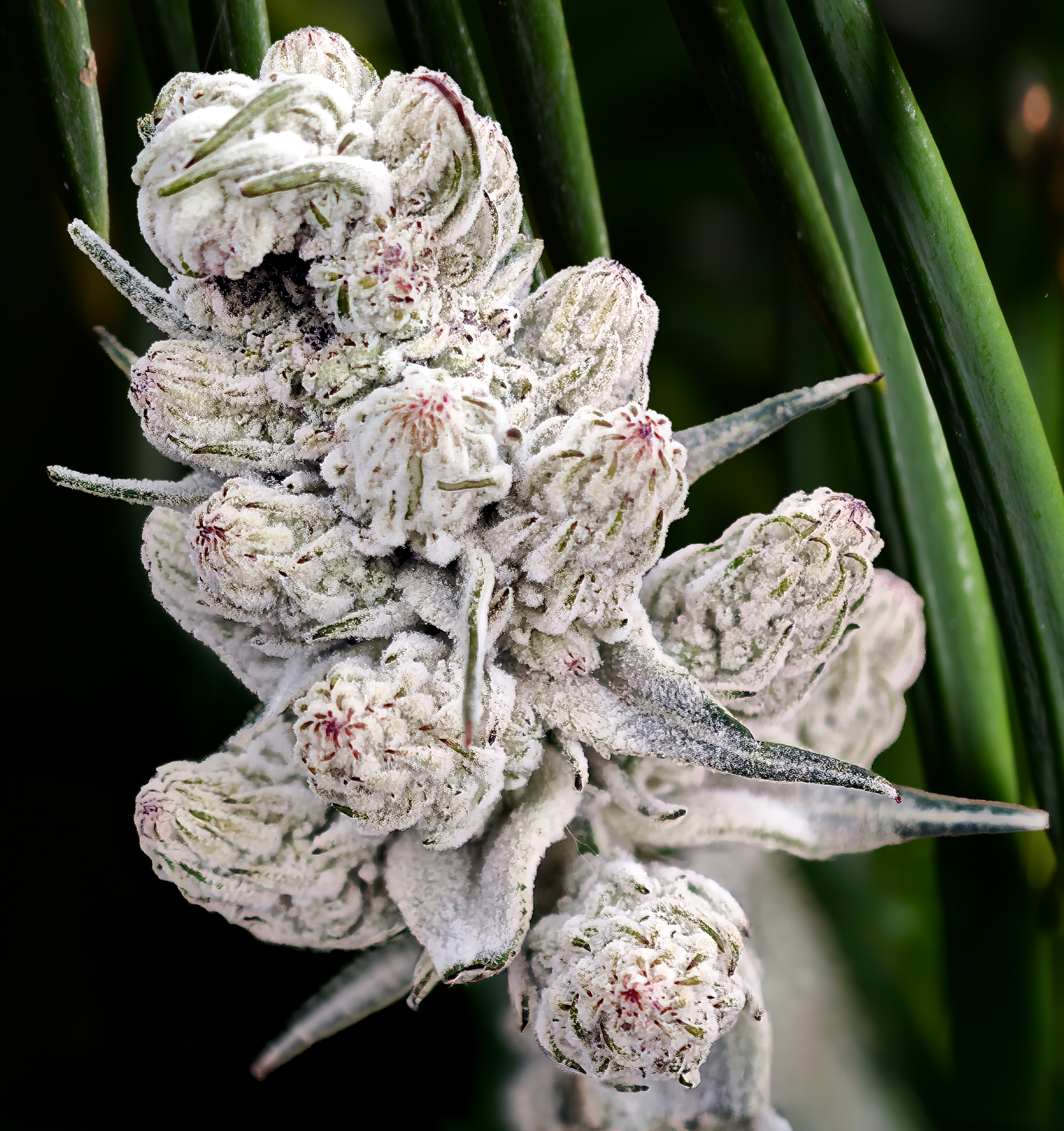
Powdery immature inflorescence

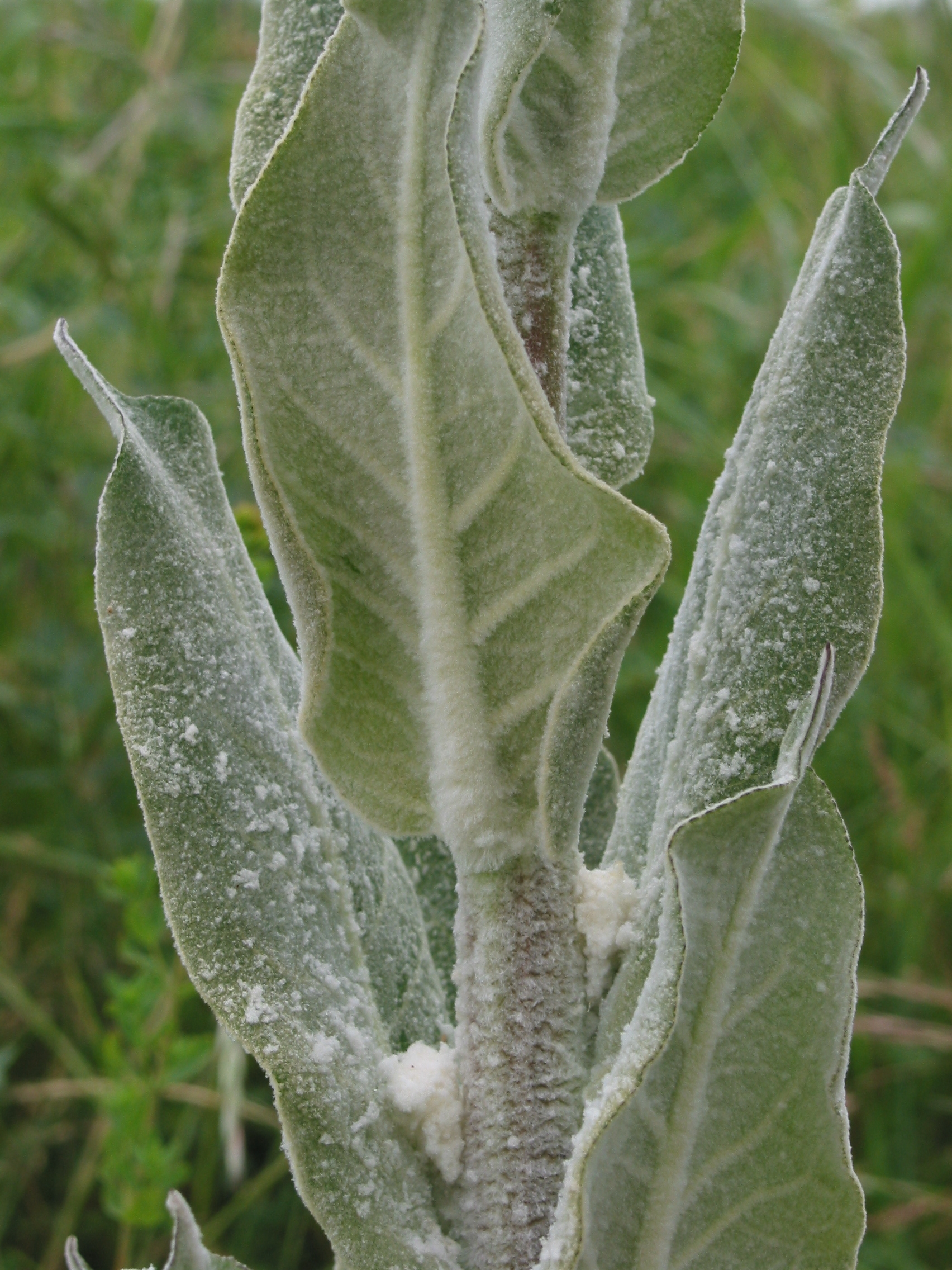
Stem and leaves in Germany, showing the dense pale hairs
