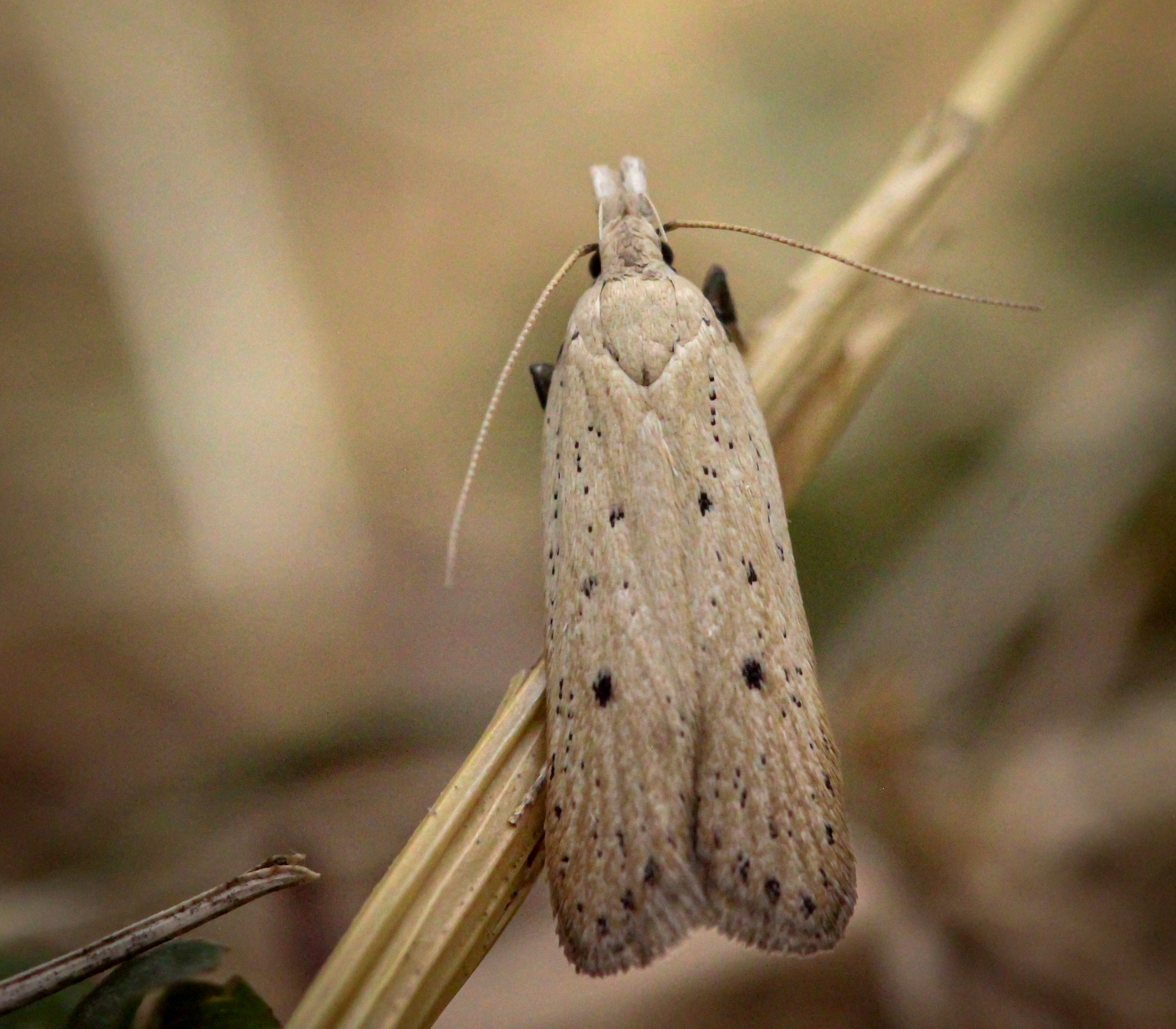
- Nothris verbascella in southeast France

Scientific classification
- Domain: Eukaryota
- Kingdom: Animalia
- Phylum: Arthropoda
- Class: Insecta
- Order: Lepidoptera
- Family: Gelechiidae
- Genus: Nothris
- Species: N. verbascella

Binomial name
- Nothris verbascella (Denis & Schiffermüller, [1775])

Synonyms
- Tinea verbascella Denis & Schiffermüller, 1775; Nothris discretella Rebel, 1889; Nothris verbascella clarella Amsel, 1935

= Nothris verbascella =

Species of moth

Nothris verbascella, the Norfolk snout or clay groundling, is a moth of the family Gelechiidae. It was described by Michael Denis and Ignaz Schiffermüller in 1775. It is found in almost all of Europe, Transcaucasia, Asia Minor, the Near East and the Russian Far East. It had been considered extinct in Britain since 1971, but was rediscovered in Norfolk on 4 September 2024.

The wingspan is 17–21 mm. There are two generations per year with adults on wing from May to early October. The caterpillars feed on hoary mullein Verbascum pulverulentum and some other species of mullein.
