= Scovil Neales =

Scovil Neales (19 April 1864 – 13 March 1936) was Dean of Fredericton from 1915 to 1932.

Neales was educated at the University of New Brunswick and was ordained in 1888. He was a Missionary-in-Charge at Southampton, New Brunswick until 1894. Between 1984 and 1987, Neales became a Rector of Andover, New Brunswick; he held the same title in Sussex, New Brunswick from 1897 until 1915. He was an Archdeacon of Fredericton from 1895 to 1915.
