= Bill Hockin =

Canadian Anglican priest (born 1938)

The Right Reverend William (Bill) Hockin
- Fredericton, Retired
- Diocese: Fredericton
- Term ended: 2003
- Other posts: Dean of Fredericton; Rector of St Paul's Bloor Street

Orders
- Ordination: 1962 - deacon 1963 - priest
- Consecration: 2000

Personal details
- Born: September 30, 1938 (age 88)
- Spouse: Isabelle Hockin
- Profession: Bishop, Lecturer, Author, Speaker
- Education: College of Emmanuel & St Chad; Waterloo Lutheran University

William Joseph Hockin (born 30 September 1938) is an Anglican priest and author.

He was a curate at All Saints, Windsor until 1966. He was educated at Wilfrid Laurier University and ordained in 1963. He then served the parishes of All Saints, Waterloo, St John Tillsonburg and St George London. He was Archdeacon of Middlesex from 1984 to 1986 and then Rector of St Paul's Toronto for a decade. He was Dean of Fredericton from 1996 to 1998 when he was elected Coadjutor Bishop of Fredericton. He became the seventh Diocesan Bishop of Fredericton in 2000, serving for three years.

== Notes ==
Anglican Communion titles
| Preceded by George Colborne Lemmon | Bishop of Fredericton; 2000 – 2003 | Succeeded by Claude Weston Miller |
