= William Warrington =

English stained glass artist (1796–1869)

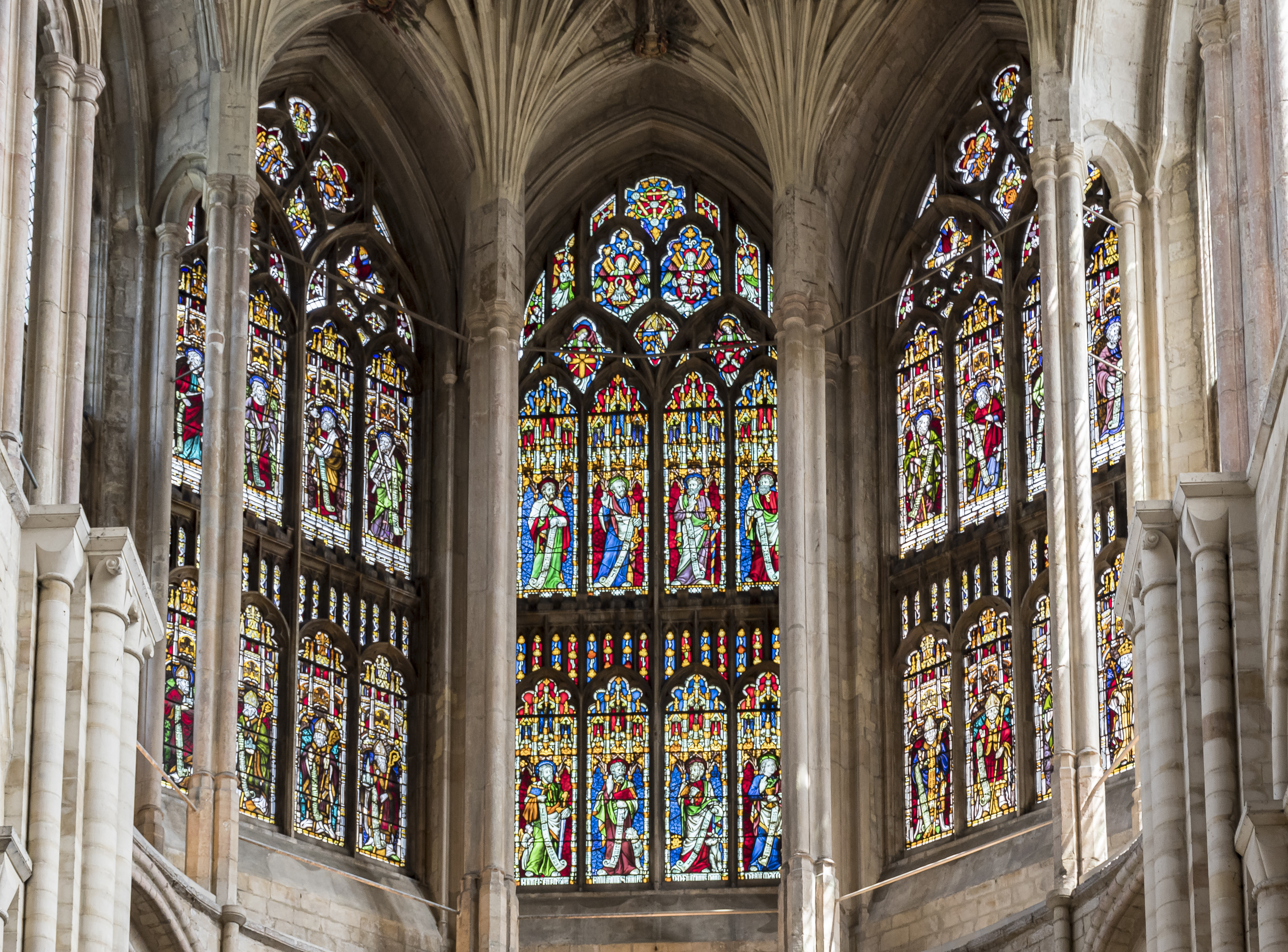
Windows of the presbytery of Norwich Cathedral, begun by Samuel Yarington of Norwich, 1846, and revised by Warrington

William Warrington (1796–1869) was an English maker of stained glass windows. His firm, operating from 1832 to 1875, was one of the earliest of the English Medieval revival and served clients such as Norwich and Peterborough Cathedrals. Warrington was a historian of medieval glass and published an illustrated book The History of Stained Glass.

== Biographical ==
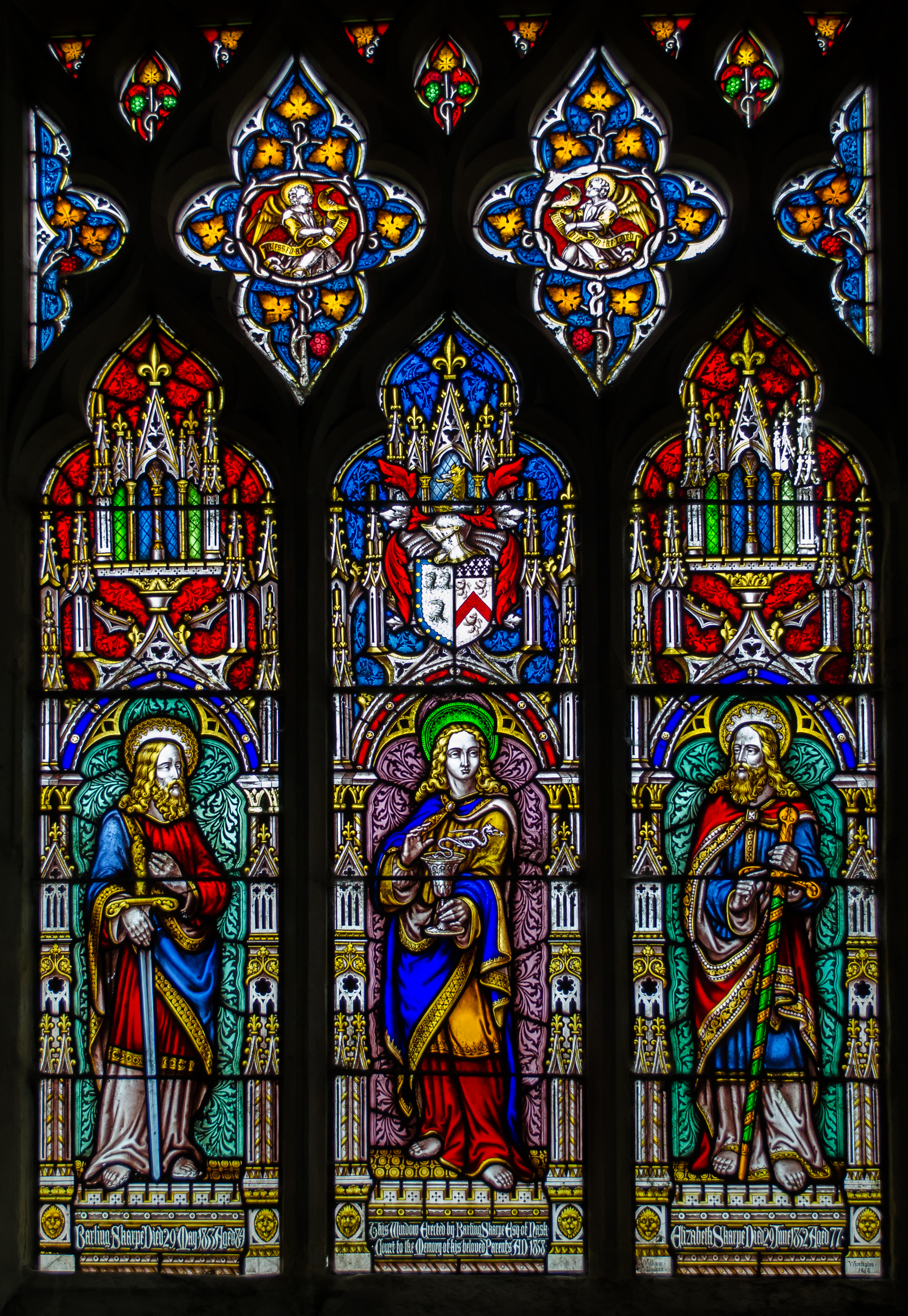
Window from St Mary's Church, Westwell, Kent, depicting three saints and demonstrating Warrington's distinctive painting. Signed and dated 1858

William was one of at least five children born to William Warrington (born 1768, New Romney) and his wife Sarah Wren. He was baptised at New Romney on 4 Mar 1796. One of his nephews married a sister of John Surtees's patrilineal great-grandfather.

In his youth, Warrington first trained with his father as a painter of armorial shields. He then moved for a time into the stained glass workshop of Thomas Willement, one of the earliest such workshops to be of high renown. In 1832 Warrington established his own stained glass company, where he produced windows that well satisfied the rising fashion of Gothic Revival and in which his own skills as an armorial painter were utilised in the production of domestic as well as ecclesiastical windows.

From studying existent ancient windows and emulation of the leading techniques of the master Thomas Willement, Warrington developed a style which allowed him to create windows strongly resembling those of the 13th and 14th centuries in appearance. His windows became the preferred choice of the architect Augustus Welby Northmore Pugin who used them in most of his earliest churches, between 1838 and 1842.

But Pugin was soon to fall out with Warrington, claiming “The Glass-Painters will shorten my days, they are the greatest plague I have. The reason I did not give Warrington the window at the hospital is this. He has lately become so conceited and got nearly as expensive as Willement.” Warrington produced drawings of windows to be used by Pugin in the Houses of Parliament, but the firms that Pugin employed were Ballantine and Allen and Hardman & Co.

In 1848 Warrington published The History of Stained Glass, from the Earliest Period of the Art to the Present Time . The book came out in a folio edition with coloured lithographs illustrating British stained glass windows from the 11th to the 15th centuries. However Warrington expressed his dislike of the glass of the centuries that followed as being "a misconception and misapplication of this art."

Among Warrington's significant commissions was the tiered arrangement of windows for the Eastern Apse of Norwich Cathedral. He also designed for Ely Cathedral, where his work may still be seen, both installed and on display in the Stained Glass Museum.

After Warrington's death in 1869, the firm continued until 1875.

== Style ==
Warrington was able to reproduce closely the geometric and foliate backgrounds of the 13th century and create pictorial rondels composed of small pieces of glass that gave a similar impression to the Medieval originals, though tending to let through more light and have less luminosity, because the nature of the glass was less flawed and therefore less refractive. Warrington's windows often contain a background comprising a distinctive pattern of little red and blue diagonal checks which was copied from medieval originals. Many of Warrington's Gothic Revival windows have a pleasant simplicity about them, the stylised foliage which takes up much of the window space being less heavy in appearance than some of his rivals, such as Clutterbuck, and based more closely upon recognisable plants.

The balance and arrangements of pictorial scenes within their formal background shows Warrington as a much more skilful designer than his teacher Willement, in whose windows the overall arrangement has a fairly arbitrary quality. Warrington's figurative painting strives towards the Medieval in its forms, which are somewhat elongated and elegant, with simply-painted drapery falling in deep folds in such a way that line and movement is emphasised in the pictorial composition. His painting of the details, particularly of faces, is both masterly and exquisite. Towards the end of his career he also designed windows in a more painterly and less Gothic manner to suit changing tastes.

== List of works ==
Designs by Warrington

Frontispiece with the cipher Warrington used in his windows

An armorial window for the House of Lords.

Design for Norwich Cathedral

England

- Thornton Hall, Thornton, Buckinghamshire
- Ely Cathedral, Ely, Cambridgeshire
- St Peter's, Heversham, Cumbria
- St George's Church, Brede, East Sussex
- St Andrew's Church, Hove, East Sussex (Raising of Lazarus and Jairus' daughter)
- St Mary's Church, Salehurst, East Sussex (The Gospel)
- St John's Church, Deptford, Greater London (Presentation of Christ)
- St Margaret's Church, Addington, Kent (Ascension of Jesus)
- Mount St Bernard Abbey, Coalville, Leicestershire
- St Andrew's Church, Field Dalling, Norfolk
- Norwich Cathedral, Norwich, Norfolk
- Church of St Mary Magdalene, Albrighton, near Bridgnorth, Shropshire
- St John the Divine, Horninglow, Staffordshire (Life of Saint John the Evangelist)
- All Saints' Church, Leamington Spa, Warwickshire (Saint James and John the Evangelist, 1900)
- St Mary's College, New Oscott, Warwickshire (1838)
- St Mary's RC Church, Sutton Coldfield, Warwickshire (1838)
- All Saints' Church, Lindfield, West Sussex

Canada

- St Anne's Chapel, Fredericton, New Brunswick
- Basilica of St. John the Baptist, St John's, Newfoundland and Labrador
- Presentation Convent, St John's, Newfoundland and Labrador

Republic of Ireland

- Lissadell House, Lissadell, County Sligo

== Other early 19th-century studios ==
Domestic armorial window

- Thomas Willement
- William Wailes
- Charles Edmund Clutterbuck
- Hardman & Co.

== See also ==
- Stained glass
- Stained glass - British glass, 1811-1918
- Victorian Era
- Gothic Revival
