= Geoffrey Hall (priest) =

Geoffrey M. Hall is a Canadian Anglican priest. As of September 2026 he is Dean of Fredericton in New Brunswick.

== Early life and education ==
Geoffrey M. Hall was born in Woodstock, New Brunswick, Canada.

He graduated from Woodstock High School in 1979.

In 1986 he graduated from the University of New Brunswick with a degree in Education (BEd) with a major in Environmental Studies and a minor in General Science. Admitted as Master of Divinity (MDiv - Atlantic School of Theology, Halifax) in 1990.

He was ordained deacon in 1990 and priest in 1991.

== Career ==
Hall served in parishes of the Diocese of Fredericton: St. Philip's, Moncton, Central Kings, St. Paul (Saint John), the Tobique (Plaster Rock), Grand Bay. and Ketepec (1993–2003), Archdeacon of St. Andrews (2001–2003) and executive assistant to the Bishop of Fredericton and Diocesan Archdeacon (2003–2014).

He has served as Dean of Fredericton from 1 September 2014 to the present (September 2026).
