= Same-sex marriage in Newfoundland and Labrador =

Same-sex marriage has been legal in Newfoundland and Labrador since December 21, 2004, when the province was ordered by the Supreme Court of Newfoundland and Labrador to issue marriage licences to same-sex couples. This decision followed similar cases in seven other provinces and territories, and pre-dated by seven months the federal Civil Marriage Act of 2005, which legalised same-sex marriage throughout Canada. Newfoundland and Labrador was the eighth jurisdiction in Canada and the eleventh in the world to legalise same-sex marriage.

== Court ruling ==
On November 4, 2004, two lesbian couples who had been denied marriage licences filed a lawsuit, Pottle v. Attorney General of Canada, against the federal and provincial governments, requesting that the Government of Newfoundland and Labrador be ordered to issue marriage licences to same-sex couples. The couples were Jacqueline Pottle and Noelle French, and Lisa Zigler and Theresa Walsh. Newfoundland and Labrador thus became the eighth of Canada's thirteen provinces and territories to have such a lawsuit filed. The Government of Canada had recently ceased to oppose such lawsuits. The provincial government also did not oppose the lawsuit; the provincial Attorney General, Tom Marshall, announced that his office would not oppose the suit. The case began on December 13, and was heard starting on December 20, 2004.

Justice Derek Green of the Supreme Court of Newfoundland and Labrador took only one day to decide to follow the precedents from the other provinces and Yukon and ordered that same-sex couples be issued marriage licences, thus making same-sex marriage legal in Newfoundland and Labrador. Attorney General Marshall indicated that the government would comply immediately. Celebrating the ruling, French said, "It means so much for us to be able to marry right here in Newfoundland, rather than having to travel to another province. Now my parents will be able to come to our wedding. I can't tell you how happy that makes me. We're getting married this Thursday, right here in St. John's. We're so honoured that Mayor Wells will be performing our ceremony." Pottle and French were married on December 23 in St. John's in a ceremony officiated by Mayor Andy Wells. Walsh also celebrated the court ruling, saying "Marriage signifies societal recognition and affirmation of a relationship between two people who love each other and are committed to each other. I love Lisa and want to be with her for the rest of my life." Spokespeople for Canadians for Equal Marriage and Egale Canada welcomed the decision. A lawyer for the couples said, "As is now clear in Canadian law, the judge found that it is unconstitutional to exclude same-sex couples from civil marriage. This finding was supported by the ruling of the Supreme Court of Canada last week, who stated quite clearly that the Charter protects both equality rights and freedom of religion", citing the reference question to the Supreme Court of Canada regarding the constitutionality of same-sex marriage in Canada.

Some officiants, including mayors Claude Elliott of Gander and Jerry Dean of Botwood, said that they would refuse to officiate at such ceremonies. The provincial government warned its civil marriage commissioners, such as mayors or justices of the peace, that they must perform these marriages or resign, as the marriages are now legal. This mirrored an earlier move by the Manitoba Provincial Government. This was widely criticised by conservative and fundamentalist Christian groups. Desiree Dichmont, a marriage commissioner, resigned from her post following the legalisation of same-sex marriage in the province, citing her religious beliefs. She later filed a complaint with the Newfoundland and Labrador Human Rights Commission, arguing that she had been unfairly discriminated against because of her religion. The commission determined in 2015 that the province had been justified in terminating her appointment. Dichmont died in 2016, age 90, and lawyers representing her estate appealed the decision. In January 2021, Supreme Court Justice Vikas Khaladkar ruled in favour of the commission and agreed that the provincial government had had the right to require her to resign unless she agreed to perform marriages to all couples. Khaladkar ordered Dichmont's estate to pay costs to the province and the commission.

Gordon Young, an evangelical pastor of the First Assembly Church of St. John's, asked the Newfoundland and Labrador Court of Appeals in February 2005 to allow him to appeal the ruling that legalized same-sex marriage. While Young had standing in the case because he was granted intervenor status, his appeal did not proceed.

== Provincial legislation ==
The Constitution Act, 1867 (French: Loi constitutionnelle de 1867; Inuktitut: ᐱᖁᔭᕐᔪᐊᖅ ᐱᖁᔭᖓᓂ, Piqujarjuaq Piqujangani; Innu: Tshishe-Utshimashkuessiu-mashinaikan) is universally interpreted as giving provinces jurisdiction over only the solemnization of marriage, while all other aspects, including capacity to marry, are under federal jurisdiction. On this basis, the Parliament of Canada can legislate on the substantive law of marriage, as it did in 2005 with the Civil Marriage Act.

In April 2002, the Newfoundland and Labrador House of Assembly amended provincial law to allow same-sex couples to adopt children jointly. On 26 May 2009, the House repealed the Solemnization of Marriage Act and enacted in its stead the Marriage Act, which uses gender-neutral language with regard to married spouses. The legislation was given royal assent by Lieutenant Governor John Crosbie on 28 May, and went into effect on 1 October 2009. Further legislation passed in December 2009 replaced references to "husband and wife" and "a man and a woman" with "spouses" and "two persons" in other acts, namely the Family Law Act. Provincial law also recognises common-law relationships (French: union de fait; Inuktitut: ᐊᐃᑉᐸᕆᖕᓂᖅ ᑲᑎᑎᑕᐅᓯᒪᒐᓂ, aipparingniq katititausimagani; Innu: eka ka nipauht kauitapimituht) for limited purposes. The Family Law Act allows common-law partners to enter into cohabitation agreements, which provide couples, same-sex or opposite-sex, the ability to contract property division at separation. However, unlike married spouses, individuals in common-law relationships do not have an automatic right to inherit their partner's property unless they are explicitly mentioned in a will.

== Marriage statistics ==
The 2016 Canadian census showed that there were 690 same-sex couples living in Newfoundland and Labrador.

In 2006, Kim and Jennifer Oliver, a same-sex couple from Nunatsiavut, had to change the date and location of their marriage due to local protests and opposition. The couple were married in Happy Valley-Goose Bay.

== Religious performance ==
In July 2019, the synod of the Anglican Church of Canada passed a resolution known as "A Word to the Church", allowing its dioceses to choose whether to bless and perform same-sex marriages. In September of that same year, Bishop Geoff Peddle of the Diocese of Eastern Newfoundland and Labrador sanctioned requests from several local parishes to perform same-sex marriages; among them, the St. Michael and All Angels Church in St. John's. The Diocese of Western Newfoundland held a special synod meeting to discuss the matter in September 2019 and voted by 94 percent to perform same-sex marriages. The measure includes a freedom of conscience clause for clergy opposed to performing the marriages, but non-consenting clergy "will do a non-biased, affirming referral to the regional dean or the archdeacon and we will find a priest that will go and do that wedding", said Bishop John Organ. Likewise, the Diocese of Central Newfoundland has allowed its parishes to perform same-sex marriages since November 2019, following a synod vote on 27 October in which 87 percent were in favour. The move was welcomed by Bishop John Watton.

Some other religious organisations also perform same-sex marriages in their places of worship, including the United Church of Canada, Quakers, the Evangelical Lutheran Church in Canada, and the Canadian Unitarian Council.

== See also ==
- Same-sex marriage in Canada
- LGBT rights in Canada
