= Ecclesiastical Province of Canada =

Quebec division of the Anglican Church of Canada

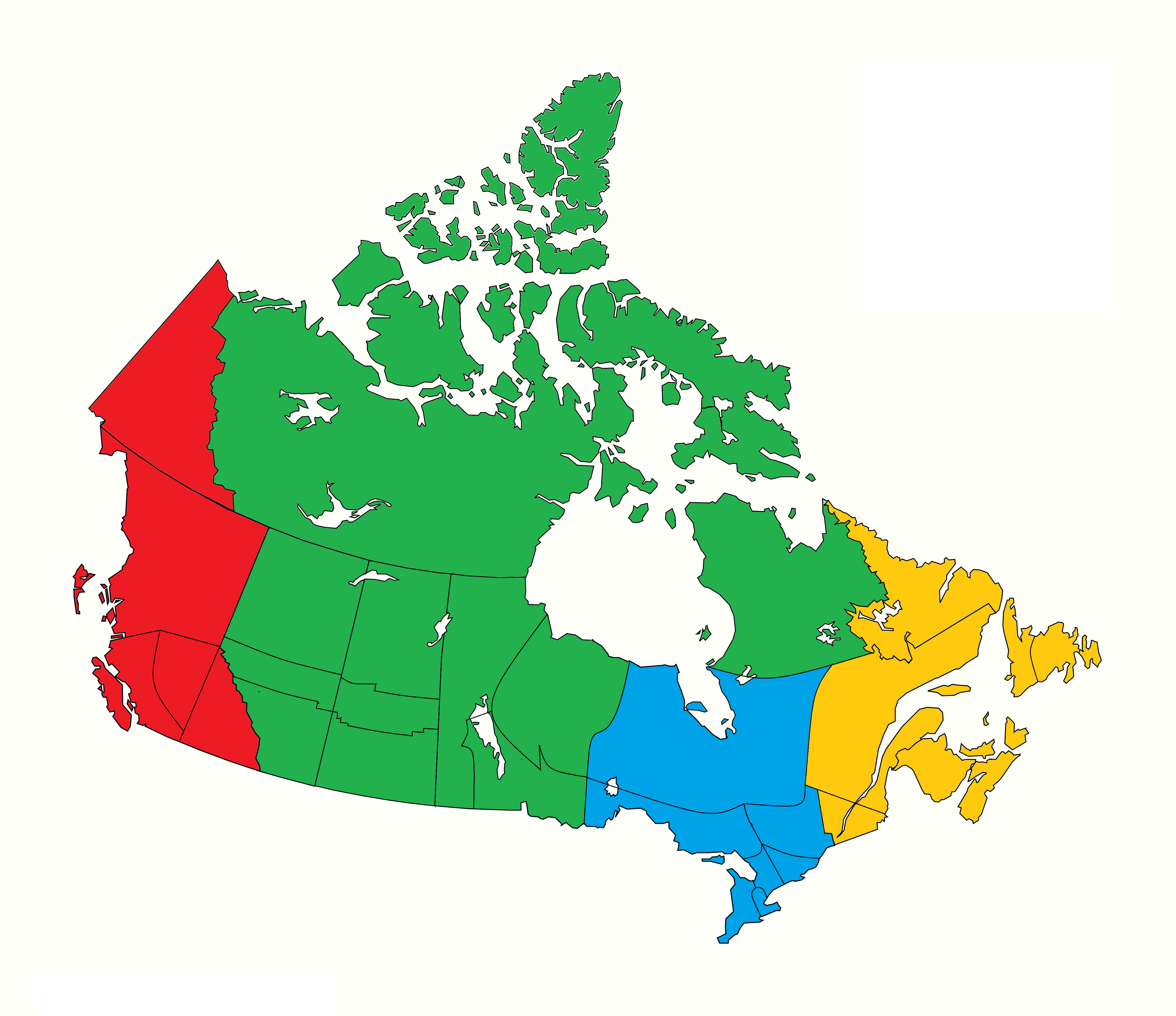
- The extent of the Province of Canada shown in yellow
- Church: Anglican Church of Canada
- Metropolitan bishop: David Edwards
- Cathedral: Christ Church Cathedral
- Dioceses: 7

Arms of the Ecclesiastical Province

The Ecclesiastical Province of Canada, founded in 1860, forms one of four ecclesiastical provinces in the Anglican Church of Canada (ACC). Despite modern use of the name Canada, the ecclesiastical province covers only the former territory of Lower Canada (i.e., southern and eastern Quebec), the Maritimes, and Newfoundland and Labrador. It once also included Upper Canada (Ontario), which was split off as the Ecclesiastical Province of Ontario in 1911.

== Dioceses ==
The province comprises seven dioceses:

Diocese name	Bishop	Cathedral	See city	Province	Region	Members	Parishes	Land Area
Montreal	Victor-David Mbuyi Bipungu	Christ Church Cathedral	Montreal	Quebec	Estrie: (Brome-Missisquoi RCM, La Haute-Yamaska RCM), Lanaudière Laurentides, Laval, Montérégie, Montreal (region)	7,025	68	21,400 sq km (8,300 sq mi)
Quebec	Bruce Myers	Cathedral of the Holy Trinity	Quebec City	Quebec	Bas-Saint-Laurent, Saguenay–Lac-Saint-Jean, Capitale-Nationale, Mauricie, Estrie: (Coaticook RCM, Le Granit RCM, Le Haut-Saint-François RCM, Le Val-Saint-François RCM, Les Sources RCM, Memphrémagog RCM, Sherbrooke),	1,586	65	720,000 sq km (280,000 sq mi)
Fredericton	David Edwards	Christ Church Cathedral	Fredericton	New Brunswick	New Brunswick	9,823	72	71,450 sq km (27,590 sq mi)
Nova Scotia and Prince Edward Island	Sandra Fyfe	All Saints Cathedral, St. Peter's Cathedral	Halifax and Charlottetown	Nova Scotia and Prince Edward Island	Nova Scotia and Prince Edward Island	21,892	94	58,602 sq km (22,631 sq mi)
Western Newfoundland	Vacant	Cathedral of St. John the Evangelist	Corner Brook	Newfoundland and Labrador	Western Newfoundland	16,360	30	
Central Newfoundland	John Watton	St. Martin's Cathedral	Gander	Newfoundland and Labrador	Central Newfoundland	9,375	27	
Eastern Newfoundland and Labrador	Samuel Rose	Cathedral of St. John the Baptist	St. John's	Newfoundland and Labrador	Eastern Newfoundland	21,053	39	

== Metropolitans of Canada ==
A metropolitan, elected from among the province's diocesan bishops, heads each province of the Anglican Church of Canada. On election, this bishop then becomes archbishop of his or her diocese and metropolitan of the province. David Edwards, the Bishop of Fredericton, became the metropolitan of the Province of Canada in 2020.

From 1861 until 1870 the Bishop of Montreal served as metropolitan over the four dioceses of the then Province of Canada (i.e., Upper and Lower Canada – modern Ontario and Quebec). The province expanded in 1870 and 1871 to include New Brunswick and Nova Scotia. After 1878 the role of metropolitan of the province of Canada became one elected from among the diocesan bishops of the province.

Order	Name	Diocese	Dates	Notes
1st	Francis Fulford	Bishop of Montreal	1861–1868	
2nd	Ashton Oxenden	Bishop of Montreal	1869–1878	
3rd	John Medley	Bishop of Fredericton	1879–1892	
4th	John Lewis	Archbishop of Ontario	1893–1900	
5th	William Bond	Archbishop of Montreal	1901–1906	Primate of All Canada, 1904–1906
6th	Arthur Sweatman	Archbishop of Toronto	1907–1909	
7th	Charles Hamilton	Archbishop of Ottawa	1909–1912	
8th	Clarendon Worrell	Archbishop of Nova Scotia	1915–1934	Primate of All Canada, 1931–1934
9th	John Richardson	Archbishop of Fredericton	1934–1938	
10th	John Hackenley	Archbishop of Nova Scotia	1939–1943	
11th	Philip Carrington	Archbishop of Quebec	1944–1960	
12th	John Dixon	Archbishop of Montreal	1960–1962	
13th	Henry O'Neil	Archbishop of Fredericton	1963–1972	
14th	William Davis	Archbishop of Nova Scotia	1972–1975	
15th	Robert Seaborn	Archbishop of Newfoundland (later Archbishop of Eastern Newfoundland and Labrador)	1975–1980	
16th	Harold Nutter	Archbishop of Fredericton	1980–1989	
17th	Reginald Hollis	Archbishop of Montreal	1989–1990	
18th	Stewart Payne	Archbishop of Western Newfoundland	1990–1997	
19th	Arthur Peters	Archbishop of Nova Scotia	1997–2002	
20th	Andrew Hutchison	Archbishop of Montreal	2002–2004	Primate of the Anglican Church of Canada, 2004–2007
21st	Bruce Stavert	Archbishop of Quebec	2004–2009	
22nd	Claude Miller	Archbishop of Fredericton	2009–2014	
23rd	Percy Coffin	Archbishop of Western Newfoundland	2014–2017	
24th	Ronald Cutler	Archbishop of Nova Scotia and Prince Edward Island	2017–2020	
25th	David Edwards	Archbishop of Fredericton	2020–present	

== See also ==
- Ecclesiastical provinces of the Anglican Church of Canada
- List of dioceses of the Anglican Church of Canada
