= St. John's Anglican Church (Peggys Cove, Nova Scotia) =

Church building in Halifax, Nova Scotia, Canada

Coordinates: 44°29′33.85″N 63°54′57.93″W

St. John's, Peggys Cove ( St. Peter's Parish )
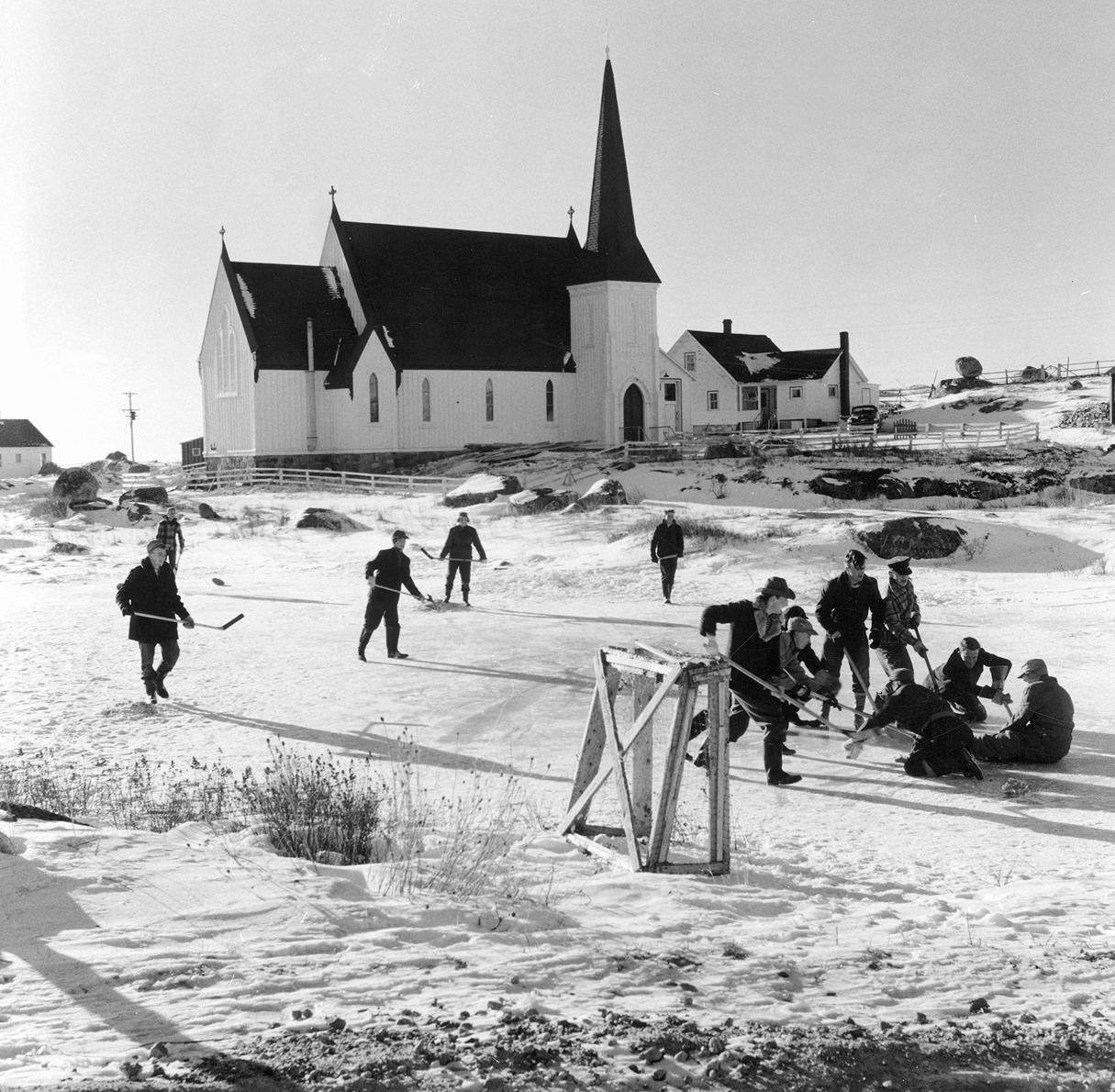
- The church in the 1950s

General information
- Architectural style: Carpenter Gothic
- Location: Peggys Cove, Nova Scotia, Canada
- Construction started: 1893
- Completed: 1894

Technical details
- Structural system: one-storey wood frame

Design and construction
- Designations

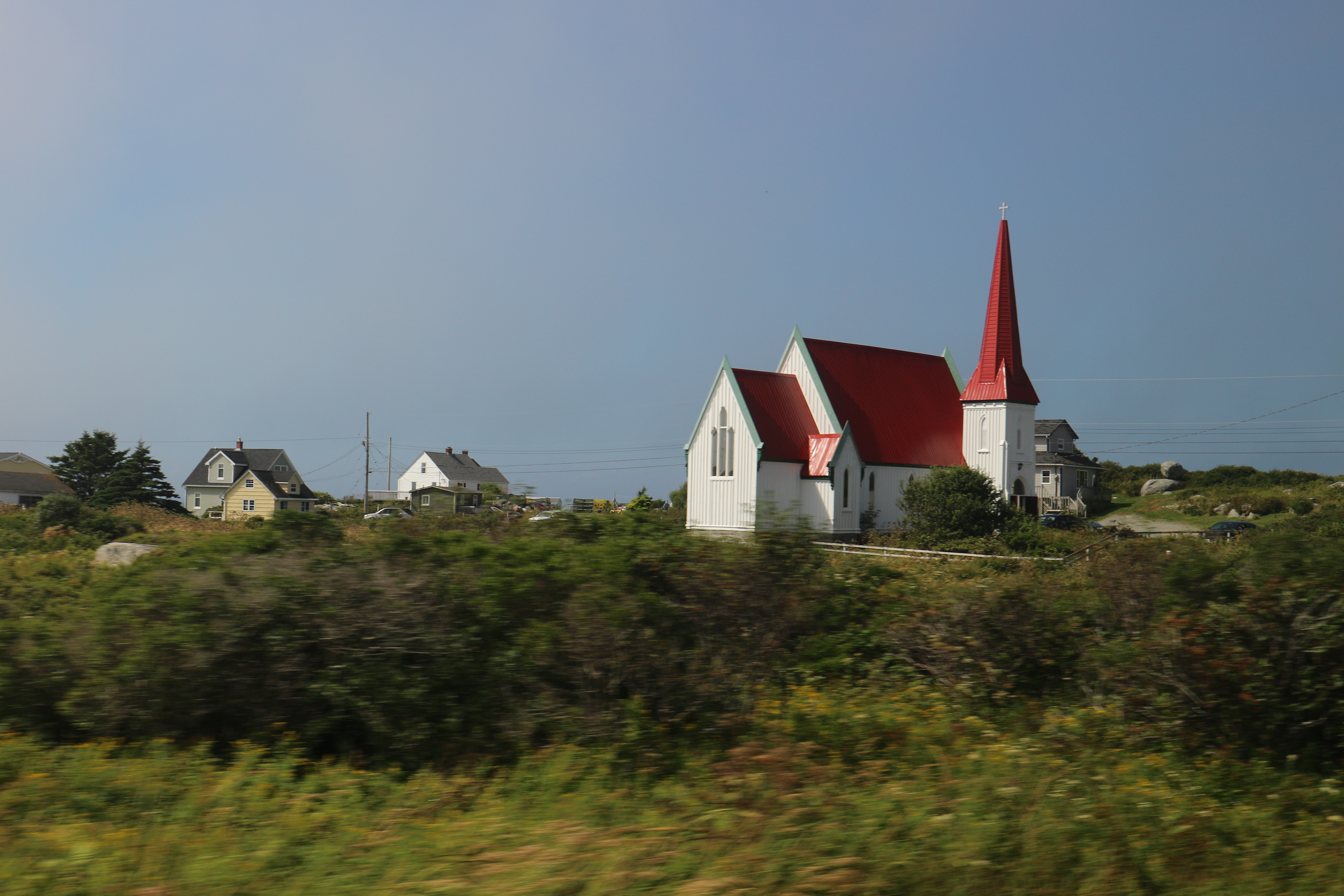
The Church in 2017

St. John's Anglican Church is a historic Carpenter Gothic style Anglican church building located at 8 Church Road in Peggys Cove, Nova Scotia, Canada. Built in 1893–94 of wood, St. John's is the only church in Peggys Cove. Its steep pitched roof, board and batten siding and lancet windows are typical of Carpenter Gothic churches. The church contains two murals painted in 1963 by noted Canadian artist and local resident William E. deGarthe.

St. John's is a municipally registered heritage site within the Halifax Regional Municipality as designated on February 22, 1993. The designation encompasses both the church building and the land on which it is located.

St. John's is part of St. Peter's Parish in the Anglican Diocese of Nova Scotia and Prince Edward Island. St. John's is open for visitors 6 days a week from June till October, staffed by volunteers. The current Priest-in-Charge of the parish (St Peter's, Hackett's Cove) is the Rev'd Taunya Dawson, MA, MDiv.
