= William Legge =

William Legge may refer to:

- William Legge (Royalist) (1608–1670), British Member of Parliament for Southampton, 1661–1670
- William Legge (MP for Portsmouth) (c.1650–c.1697), son of the above, British Member of Parliament for Portsmouth, 1685
- William Legge, 1st Earl of Dartmouth (1672–1750), Lord Privy Seal
- William Legge, 2nd Earl of Dartmouth (1731–1801), British statesman, Secretary of State for the Colonies 1772–1775
- William Legge, 4th Earl of Dartmouth (1784–1853), Fellow of the Royal Society
- William Legge, 5th Earl of Dartmouth (1823–1891), Conservative politician
- William Legge, 6th Earl of Dartmouth (1851–1936), Conservative politician
- William Legge, 7th Earl of Dartmouth (1881–1958), Conservative politician
- William Legge, 10th Earl of Dartmouth (born 1949), British peer and politician
- William Kaye Legge (1869-1946), senior British Army officer during the First World War
- William Vincent Legge (1841–1918), Australian ornithologist
- William Legge (bishop) (1913–1999), Canadian Anglican priest

== See also ==
- Wilfred Legg (born 1906), South African athlete
- Billy Legg (born 1948), English footballer
