= Holy Trinity Anglican Church (Alma, Prince Edward Island) =

Church in Prince Edward Island, Canada

General information
- Architectural style: Carpenter Gothic
- Location: Alma, Prince Edward Island, near Alberton, Prince Edward Island, Canada
- Coordinates: 46.8639°N 64.1071°W
- Construction started: 1888
- Completed: 1890

Technical details
- Structural system: wooden, single storey, steep roof

Holy Trinity Anglican Church is a large historic Carpenter Gothic style Anglican church building located at 40986 Western Road (PEI Route 2) in the unincorporated village of Alma, 4 miles north of Alberton, Prince Edward Island Canada. It was built of wood between 1888 and 1890 by local craftsmen Its steep pitched roof, lancet windows and entrance tower are typical of Carpenter Gothic churches. Its rear chancel has a separate roof line and appears to be an add on. The adjacent cemetery predates the church by one year. Because of its "well preserved carpenter Gothic architecture", its "association with the history of the Anglican Church in western Prince Edward Island" and "its contribution" to the community of Alma", it was designated a provincial heritage site by the province of Prince Edward Island on December 21, 2007.

== See also ==
- Anglican Diocese of Nova Scotia and Prince Edward Island
