= Diocese of Nova Scotia and Prince Edward Island =

Diocese of the Anglican Church in Canada

Coordinates: 45.18°N 63.56°W

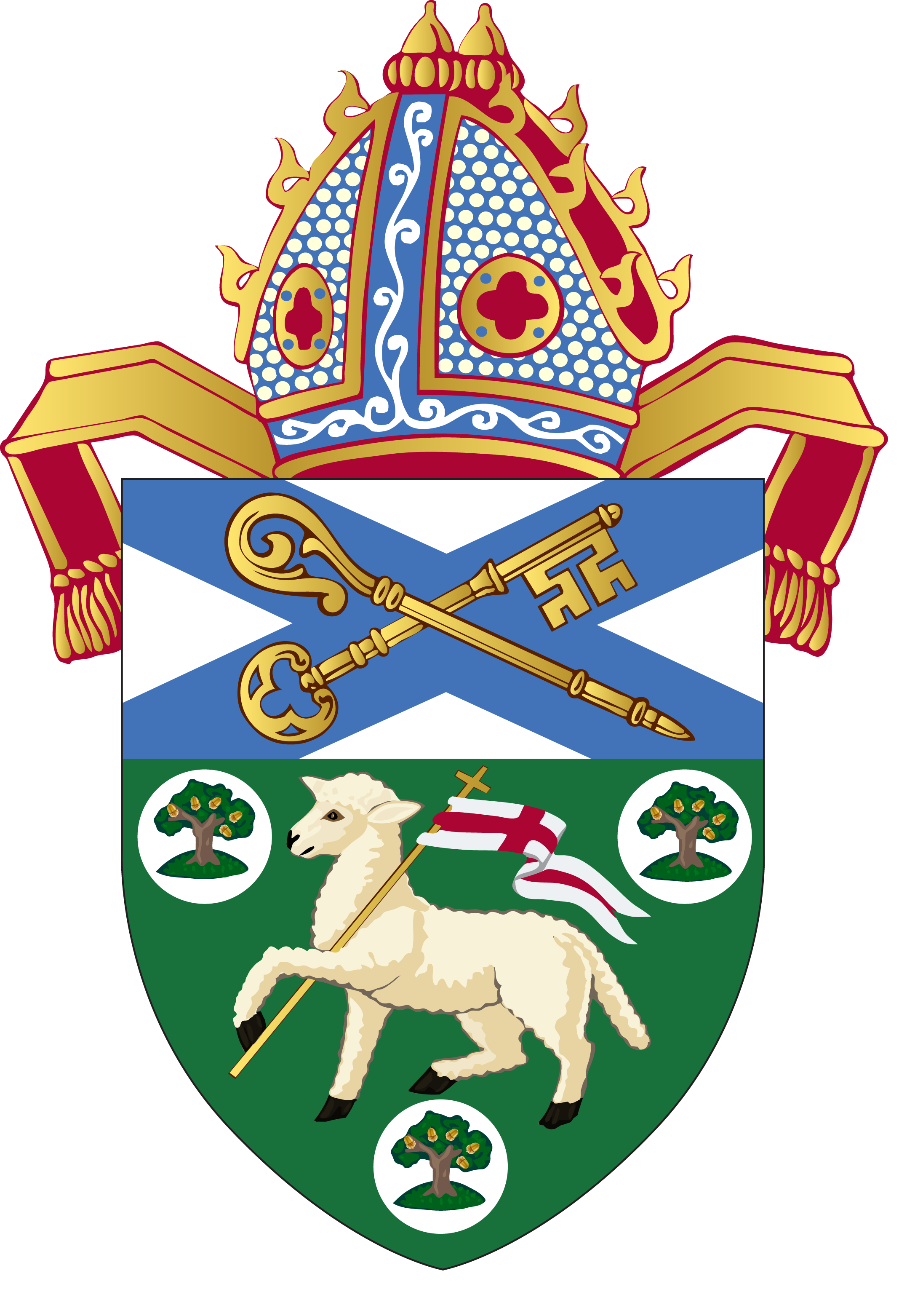

Location
- Ecclesiastical province: Province of Canada

Statistics
- Parishes: 94 (2022)
- Members: 21,892 (2022)

Information
- Rite: Anglican Church of Canada
- Cathedral: All Saints Cathedral, Halifax; St. Peter's Cathedral, Charlottetown

Current leadership
- Bishop: Sandra Fyfe

Map
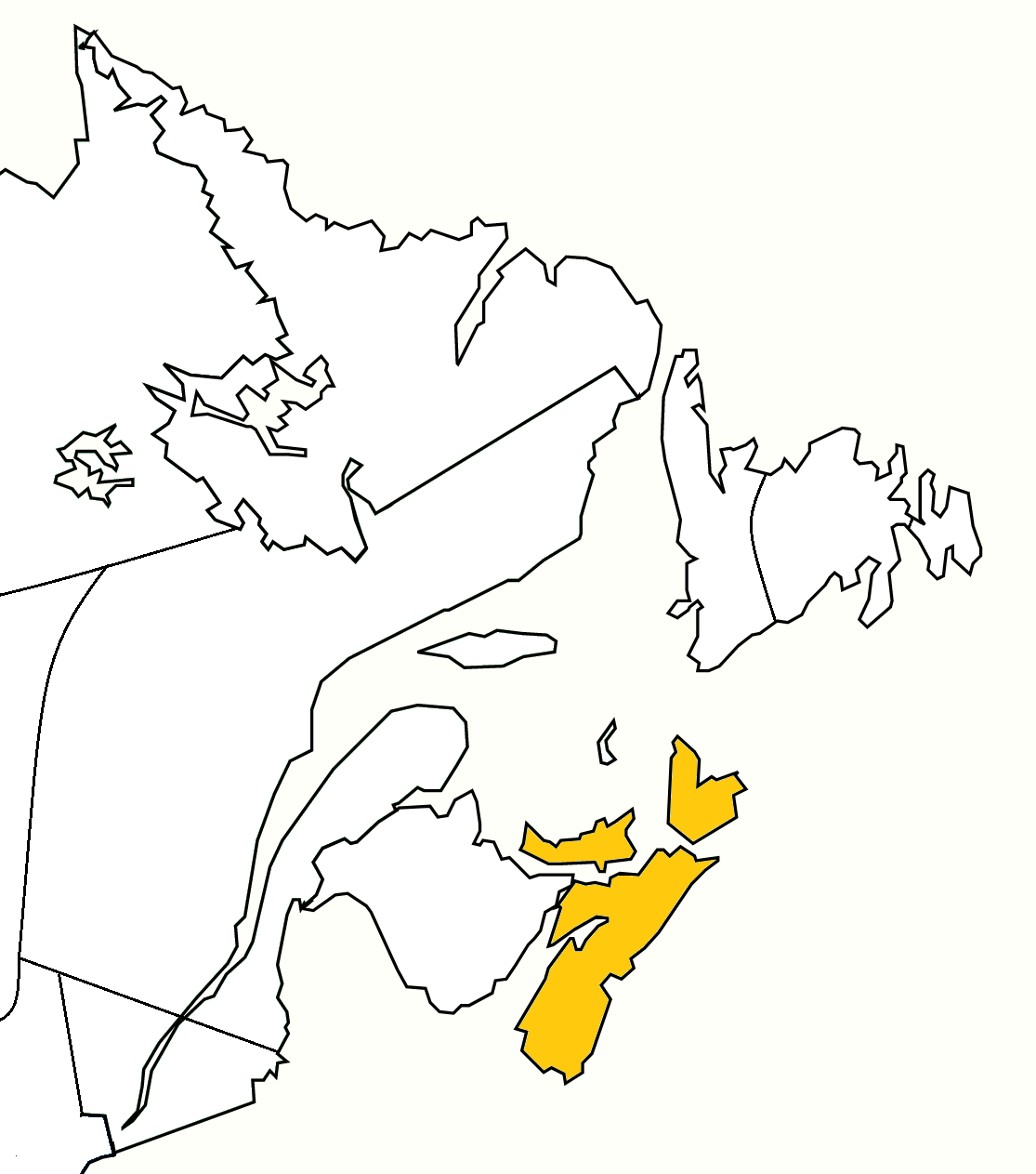
- Boundaries of the diocese within the Ecclesiastical Province of Canada

Website
- www.nspeidiocese.ca

The Diocese of Nova Scotia and Prince Edward Island is a diocese of the Ecclesiastical Province of Canada of the Anglican Church of Canada. It encompasses the provinces of Nova Scotia and Prince Edward Island and has two cathedrals: All Saints' in Halifax and St. Peter's in Charlottetown. Its de facto see city is Halifax (where the synod offices are located), and its roughly 24 400 Anglicans distributed in 239 congregations are served by approximately 153 clergy and 330 lay readers according to the last available data. According to the 2001 census, 120,315 Nova Scotians identified themselves as Anglicans (13% of the province's population), while 6525 Prince Edward Islanders did the same.

== History ==
The first recorded Anglican services in Nova Scotia were held in Annapolis Royal on October 10, 1710, and in Cape Breton Island in 1745. The Diocese was created on 11 August 1787 by Letters Patent of George III which "erected the Province of Nova Scotia into a bishop's see" and these also named Charles Inglis as first bishop of the see. The diocese was the first Church of England see created outside England and Wales (i.e. the first colonial diocese). At this point, the see covered present-day New Brunswick, Newfoundland, Nova Scotia, Prince Edward Island and Quebec. From 1825 to 1839, it included the nine parishes of Bermuda, subsequently transferred to the Diocese of Newfoundland. In 1842, her jurisdiction was described as "Nova Scotia, New Brunswick, Cape Breton, Prince Edward Island". In 1849, Archdeacon R. Willis was stationed at Halifax. In 1866, there were two archdeaconries: George McCawley was Archdeacon of Nova Scotia and J. Herbert Read of Prince Edward's Island.

Churches in the diocese that are designated heritage sites include:

- St. John's Anglican Church (Lunenburg)
- All Souls' Chapel (Charlottetown, Prince Edward Island)
- Holy Trinity Anglican Church (Alma, Prince Edward Island)
- St. George's Anglican Church (Parrsboro, Nova Scotia)
- St. John's Anglican Church (Peggys Cove, Nova Scotia)
- St. James' Anglican Church (Mahone Bay, Nova Scotia)
- St. George's Anglican Church (Sydney, Nova Scotia)

== Statistics ==
Based on the parochial reports from the year 2014 the diocese consists of 239 congregations grouped in 94 parishes, within 10 regions, each having a Regional Dean and an Archdeacon with a total membership of 24,400 people. Of the diocesan clergy 74 are parish Rectors, 19 are Priests in Charge, 101 are retired (many of whom still serve in one or other capacity -including being in charge of a parish). There are two retired bishops, 11 military chaplains; 1 health care chaplain; 2 full-time faculty and the President at the Atlantic School of Theology; 1 full-time University Chaplain and 2 part-time University Chaplains; and 1 Prison Chaplain. The diocese has a successful non-stipendiary clergy programme; currently there are 28 priests and 11 Deacons with that status. There are 330 lay readers trained to administer the sacraments at public services presided by a priest, preach, lead public worship in the absence of clergy, and other pastoral functions.

== List of bishops ==
=== Nova Scotia ===
No.	Image	Name	Dates	Notes
1		Charles Inglis	1787–1816	
2		Robert Stanser	1816–1828	
3		John Inglis	1825–1850	
4		Hibbert Binney	1851–1887	
5		Frederick Courtney	1888–1918	
6		Clarendon Worrell	1904–1925	Became Metropolitan of Canada in 1915 and Primate of all Canada in 1931.
7		John Hackenley	1925–1943	Became Metropolitan of Canada in 1939.
8		Frederick Kingston	1944–1947	consecrated Bishop of Algoma April 25, 1940, translated to Nova Scotia in 1944, became Primate of All Canada and Archbishop of Nova Scotia in 1947 and died November 20, 1950.
9		Robert Waterman	1948–1963	consecrated January 27, 1948, installed as coadjutor January 27, 1948, succeeded as diocesan, November 20, 1950, and enthroned January 26, 1951, retired June 20, 1963 and died, December 16, 1984.
10		William Davis	1958–1975	consecrated February 26, 1958, installed as coadjutor February 26, 1958 and succeeded as diocesan July 1, 1963, became metropolitan of the province June 8, 1972, retired August 31, 1975 and died, May 28, 1987.
11		George Arnold	1967–1975	consecrated September 21, 1967 and installed as suffragan September 21, 1967, elected coadjutor May 29, 1975 and succeeded as diocesan September 1, 1975, retired January 1, 1980 and died January 31, 1998.
12		Leonard Hatfield	1976–1984	consecrated October 17, 1976 and installed as suffragan October 17, 1976, elected coadjutor September 27, 1979 and succeeded as diocesan January 1, 1980, retired September 30, 1984 and died September 14, 2001.

=== Nova Scotia & PEI ===
No.	Image	Name	Dates	Notes
13		Arthur Peters	1982–2002	consecrated February 2, 1982 and installed coadjutor February 2, 1982, installed as diocesan November 29, 1984, elected metropolitan of the province October 19, 1997 and title changed from "Archbishop of Nova Scotia" to "Archbishop of Nova Scotia and Prince Edward Island" in 1999. Retired February 28, 2002
		Russel Hatten (suffragan)	1986–1990	elected and consecrated suffragan in 1986, resigned in 1990 and became Bishop to the Armed Forces.
14		Fred Hiltz	1994–2007	elected suffragan on October 6, 1994, and consecrated on January 18, 1995. His title changed to include Prince Edward Island in 1999 and he was elected coadjutor on November 9, 2001. He succeeded as diocesan on March 1, 2002, and resigned as diocesan bishop effective September 20, 2007 to become Archbishop and Primate of the Anglican Church of Canada.
15		Sue Moxley	2007–2014	elected suffragan November 2003 and consecrated on March 25, 2004. She was elected diocesan October 20, 2007 and installed on November 23, 2007.
16		Ron Cutler	2014–2019	elected suffragan on May 23, 2008, and consecrated on June 29, 2008, then elected coadjutor-bishop on November 22, 2013, to succeed Sue Moxley at her retirement on March 31, 2014. He was duly installed as diocesan bishop on May 6, 2014.
17		Sandra Fyfe	Since 2020	elected on September 12, 2020, during a vacancy of see following Cutler's retirement in the midst of the COVID-19 pandemic. The consecration took place at the Cathedral Church of All Saints on November 30, 2020, and was broadcast digitally to just over 4,200 live viewers due to strict Public Health restrictions during the ongoing pandemic.

== Parishes ==
PARISHES IN THE DIOCESE OF NOVA SCOTIA AND PEI THAT HAVE WEBPAGES:

- Aylesford and Berwick [St Mary's Auburn; Christ Church Berwick; Christ Church Morden]
- Birch Cove St Peter's
- Blandford [St. Barnabas Blandford; All Saints' Bayswater; St. Cuthbert's Northwest Cove]
- Charlottetown PEI, St Paul's
- Charlottetown PEI, St Peter's Cathedral
- Chester Parish of St Stephen [St Stephen's Chester; St George's East River; All Saints' Canaan]
- Cole Harbour, St Andrew's
- Cornwallis [st. John's Port William; St. Michael and All Angels Canning; St. Thomas' Kingsport]
- Dartmouth, Christ Church
- Dartmouth, Emmanuel
- Dartmouth, Holy Spirit
- Dartmouth, St Alban
- Dartmouth, St Andrew, Port Wallis
- Digby, Trinity Church
- Eastern Passage, St Peter
- French Village
- Hackett's Cove [St Peter's Hackett's Cove; St Andrew's Indian Harbour; St John's Peggys Cove; St James' West Dover]
- Halifax, All Saints Cathedral
- Halifax, St George's
- Halifax, St James
- Halifax, St John
- Halifax, St Mark
- Halifax, St Matthias
- Halifax, St Paul
- Halifax, St Philip
- Hatchet Lake [St. Timothy's Hachet Lake; St. Paul's Terence Bay]
- Hubbards, St Luke's
- Kentville, St James
- Lantz [Christ Church Lanz; St George's Dutch Settlement]
- Liverpool [Trinity Church Liverpool; St James' Hunts Point; Grace Church Western Head]
- Lockeport-Barrington [Church of the Ascension Barrington Passage; Church of the Resurrection Churchover; Holy Trinity Jordan Falls; Holy Cross Lockeport; St. Peter's West Green Harbour]
- Lunenburg, St John's
- Mahone Bay [St James' Mahone Bay; Christ Church Maitland; Union Church]
- Musquodoboit [St Thomas' Musquodoboit Harbour; St James' Head of Jeddore; St George's Ostrea Lake]
- New Glasgow, St George's
- New London (PEI) [St Stephen's Irishtown; St Mark's Kensington; St Thomas' Spring Brook; St Elizabeth's Springfield]
- New Ross
- North Sydney, St. John the Baptist
- Petite Riviere and New Dublin [St Peter's West LaHave; St James' LaHave; St John's West Dublin; St Mary's Crousetown; St Michael and All Angels Petite Riviere; St Mark's Broad Cove; St Alban's Vogler's Cove]
- Pictou County [St James' Pictou; St George's New Glasgow; St Alban's Thorburn; St Augustine's Trenton; Christ Church Stellarton; St Bee's Westville]
- Port Wallace, St Andrew's
- Pugwash, All Souls'
- Rawdon [St Paul's Centre Rawdon; St Stephen's Stanley; St David's Upper Rawdon; St James' Gore; Union Church Rawdon Gold Mines]
- Sackville, St John the Evangelist
- Seaforth [Christ Church; St Augustine's; St Barnabas'; St James'; St Mark's]
- Shelburne, Christ Church
- Spryfield, Emmanuel
- Stellarton, Christ Church
- Timberlea-Lakeside, St Andrew's
- Three Harbours [St. Paul's Antigonish, St. Mary's Bayfield, Holy Trinity Country Harbour]
- Western Shore Parish of St Martin's [St John's Chester Basin; St Mary's Gold River; St Mark's Martin's Point; St Martin's Martin's River]
- Westphal, St John
- Westwood Hills, St Nicholas'
- Holy Trinity, Middleton, All Saints, Kingston
- Yarmouth, Holy Trinity
