= Ron Cutler (bishop) =

Canadian Anglican archbishop

Ronald Wayne "Ron" Cutler is a Canadian Anglican bishop. He became Bishop of Nova Scotia and Prince Edward Island in 2014 and was elected Metropolitan of Canada in 2017.

Cutler was born in Montreal and educated at McGill University.

He was ordained in 1981 and served at Twillingate, Smith's Sound, Sydney Mines, Baddeck and Lower Sackville. He became a suffragan bishop in 2008 and was elected as the Diocesan on 22 November 2013. He was installed as the Bishop of Nova Scotia and Prince Edward Island on 5 May 2014. In 2017, he was elected Metropolitan of the Ecclesiastical Province of Canada, which encompasses southern and eastern Quebec, the Maritimes, and Newfoundland and Labrador.

On January 9, 2020, Cutler announced his retirement from both positions effective July 31.

Religious titles
Preceded by Sue Moxley	Bishop of Nova Scotia and Prince Edward Island; 2014 – 2020	Succeeded by Sandra Fyfe
Preceded by Percy David Coffin	Metropolitan of Canada; 2017 – 2020	Succeeded by David Edwards
