= Sue Moxley =

Canadian Anglican bishop

Susan Elizabeth Moxley was Anglican Bishop of Nova Scotia and Prince Edward Island, Canada. from 2007 to 2014.

Educated at the University of Western Ontario, she rose to become a professor at Dalhousie University. Ordained in 1985, she served at Hatchet Lake (Halifax), Terence Bay and St. Mark's, Halifax. Elected suffragan bishop of Nova Scotia and PEI, in 2003 she became its diocesan in 2007. The Reverend Dr. Moxley graduated from the University of Western Ontario (BA MA) and the University of Michigan (MA Ph.D.) Atlantic School of Theology (M.Div.).

Religious titles
Preceded by Fred Hiltz	Bishop of Nova Scotia and Prince Edward Island; 2007 – 2014	Succeeded by Ron Cutler
