= Peggys Point Lighthouse =

Peggy's Point Lighthouse
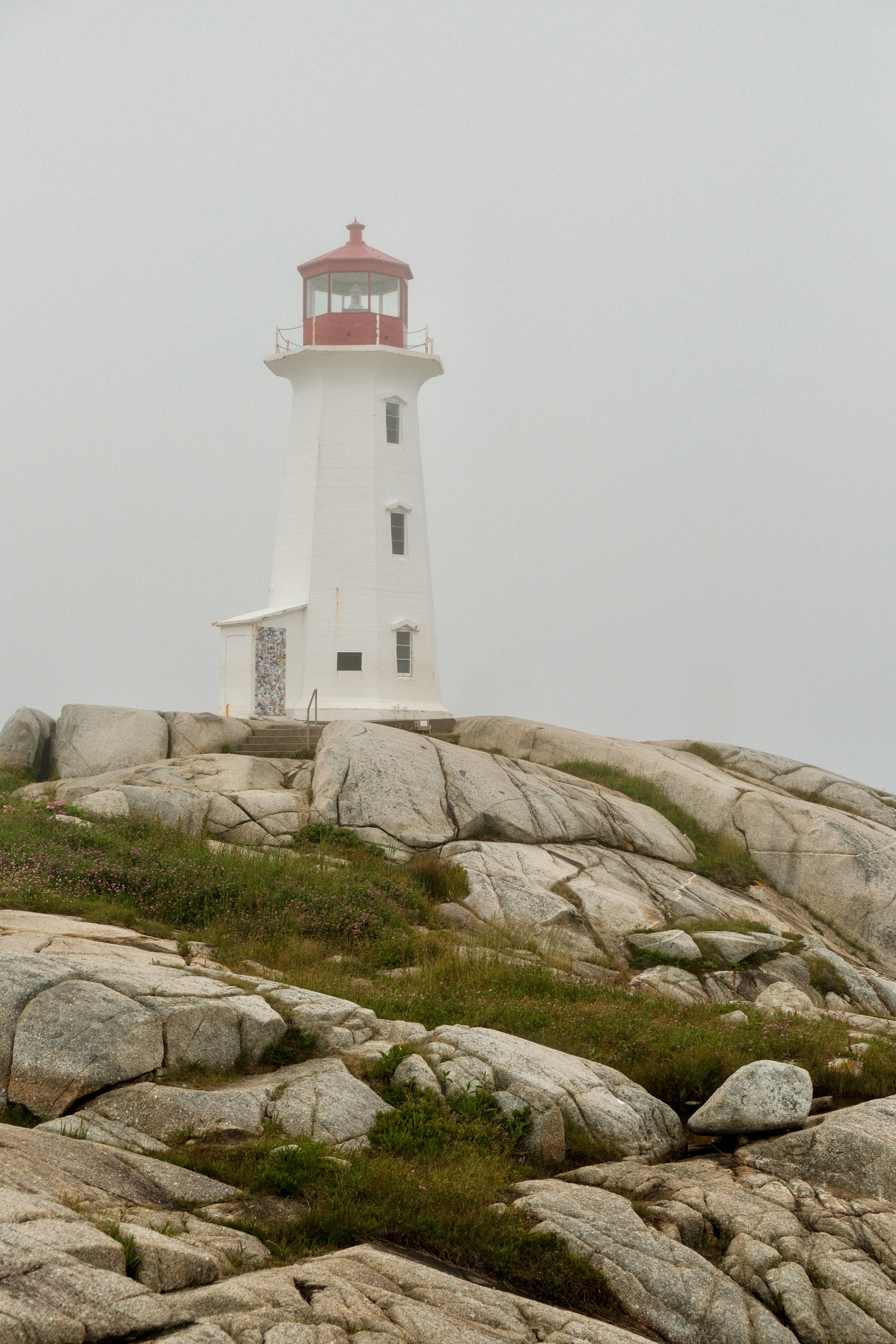
- Peggy's Cove Lighthouse, as seen in July 2025
- Location: Peggy's Cove, Nova Scotia, Canada
- Coordinates: 44°29′30.5″N 63°55′07″W

Tower
- Constructed: 1868 (first)
- Construction: concrete, steel
- Height: 15 metres (49 ft)
- Shape: octagonal tower with balcony and lantern
- Markings: white tower, red lantern
- Operator: Canadian Coast Guard
- Heritage: classified federal heritage building of Canada

Light
- First lit: 1915 (current)
- Focal height: 22 metres (72 ft)
- Range: 10 nautical miles (19 km; 12 mi)
- Characteristic: Fl R 5s.

Peggys Point Lighthouse, also known as Peggys Cove Lighthouse, is an active lighthouse and image that is iconic with Canada. Located within Peggy's Cove, Nova Scotia, it is one of the busiest tourist attractions in the province. It is a prime attraction on the Lighthouse Trail scenic drive. The lighthouse marks the eastern entrance of St. Margarets Bay and is officially known as the Peggys Point Lighthouse.

== Description ==
The classic red-and-white lighthouse is still operated by the Canadian Coast Guard. It is situated on an extensive granite outcrop at Peggys Point, immediately south of the village and its cove. This lighthouse is one of the most-photographed structures in Atlantic Canada and one of the most recognizable lighthouses in the world.

Visitors may explore the granite outcrop on Peggys Point around the lighthouse; despite numerous signs warning of unpredictable surf (including one on a bronze plaque on the lighthouse itself), several visitors each year are swept off the rocks by waves, sometimes drowning.

== History ==
The first lighthouse at Peggy's Cove was built in 1868 and was a wooden house with a beacon on the roof. At sundown, the keeper lit a kerosene oil lamp magnified by a catoptric reflector (a silver-plated mirror), creating the red beacon light marking the eastern entrance to St. Margarets Bay. That lighthouse was replaced by the current structure, an octagonal lighthouse which was built in 1914. It is made of reinforced concrete but retains the eight-sided shape of earlier generations of wooden light towers. It stands almost 15 metres (49 ft) high. The old wooden lighthouse became the keeper's dwelling and remained near the current lighthouse until it was damaged by Hurricane Edna in 1954 and was removed. The lighthouse was automated in 1958. Since then, the red light was changed to white light, then to a green light in the late 1970s. Finally, to conform to world standards, the light was changed to red in 2007.

The lighthouse used to contain a small Canada Post office in the lower level during the summer months, serving as the village post office, where visitors could send postcards and letters. Each piece of mail received a special cancellation mark in the shape of the lighthouse. However, Canada Post closed the lighthouse post office in November 2009, citing mold growth as a safety hazard. The lighthouse at Peggys Cove was declared surplus by the Canadian Coast Guard in June 2010, along with almost all lighthouses in Canada. The lighthouse had until May 29, 2012, to be nominated under the Heritage Lighthouse Protection Act by a group willing to look after it, or the lighthouse will face disposal. The province of Nova Scotia has discussed taking ownership but has not made a decision. In 2015, 74 lighthouses were listed which will be preserved under the Heritage Lighthouse Protection Act but they did not include Peggy's Cove.

In 2021, a large viewing area was built to improve accessibility and divert visitors from climbing on the nearby rocks.

== See also ==
- List of lighthouses in Canada
