= John Organ =

Canadian Anglican bishop

John Organ is a Canadian Anglican bishop. From 2018 to 2025 he was bishop of the Diocese of Western Newfoundland. He was elected to serve as bishop in June 2018. He resigned on October 1, 2025 following a controversy over his treatment of the dean of the Cathedral of St. John the Evangelist.

In 2019, Organ welcomed a decision of the diocesan synod to allow same-sex marriages to be solemnised in the diocese's churches, "The outcome of that was tremendous pain and suffering for LGBT folks, and for their families and friends and for their allies. It was a very difficult synod." The motion, which passed with a 94% majority, allows non-consenting clergy to opt out of solemnising same-sex weddings if this would violate their personal beliefs.

Church of England titles
| Preceded by Percy Coffin | Bishop of Western Newfoundland; 2018–2025 | Vacant |
