= David Edwards (bishop) =

The Most Reverend David Edwards DD
- 10th Archbishop of Fredericton
- Church: Anglican Church of Canada
- Province: Canada
- Diocese: Fredericton
- Elected: 10 May 2014
- In office: 20 September 2014–present
- Predecessor: Claude Miller
- Successor: Incumbent
- Other post: 25th Metropolitan of Canada (2020—Present)

Orders
- Ordination: 1995 Deacon; 1996 Priest
- Consecration: 2014

Personal details
- Born: Shropshire, England
- Denomination: Anglican
- Residence: Fredericton
- Spouse: Janet Edwards (d. 2018); Debbie Edwards (m. 2020)
- Education: Loughborough University Homerton College, Cambridge University of Kent at Canterbury

David Edwards is the tenth Anglican Bishop of Fredericton, Canada. He was elected coadjutor bishop at a synod in Fredericton on 10 May 2014 and, subsequently, installed as diocesan bishop on September 20, 2014. He succeeded the ninth Bishop, the Most Reverend Claude Miller, who retired on 23 June 2014. He was elected Metropolitan of the Ecclesiastical Province of Canada and assumed that position on 1 August 2020.

David Edwards was born and educated in Shropshire, England. He studied at Loughborough University and Homerton College, Cambridge and worked as a high school history teacher prior to completing diplomas in Religious and Evangelism Studies followed by a Masters of Arts in Applied Theology at the University of Kent at Canterbury.

Both prior to and following his ordination in 1995, Archbishop Edwards served in ministry in the Diocese of Chelmsford in England, including as Bishop’s Advisor in Evangelism and in the Parish of High Ongar. He moved to New Brunswick in 1998 to be Principal of Taylor College of Evangelism. He has also served in parishes in Saint John and as Parish Development Officer for the Diocese of Fredericton.

He was awarded an Honorary Doctor of Divinity from Wycliffe College (University of Toronto) in May 2015 and now serves on the College's Board of Trustees. On behalf of the Anglican Church of Canada, he also serves as Liaison Bishop to The Mission to Seafarers Canada. In 2026, Edwards announced his intention to retire in 2027 as both archbishop of Fredericton and metropolitan of Canada.

Anglican Communion titles
Preceded by Claude Miller	Bishop of Fredericton; 2014–present	Incumbent
Preceded by Ronald Cutler	Metropolitan of Canada; 2020–present	Incumbent
