= Arthur Peters (bishop) =

Canadian Anglican bishop (1935–2026)

Arthur Gordon Peters (21 December 1935 – 1 November 2026) was a Canadian Anglican bishop.

Bishop Peters was educated at the University of King's College and ordained deacon in 1963. After a curacy at Waverly he became Rector of Weymouth. He held further incumbencies at Annapolis-Granville and Christ Church, Sydney before being elected bishop coadjutor of Nova Scotia and Prince Edward Island in 1982. Two years later he succeeded as diocesan bishop. In 1997, the Bishops of the Ecclesiastical Province of Canada elected him as their metropolitan archbishop and he assumed the title Archbishop of Nova Scotia and Prince Edward Island Metropolitan of the Ecclesiastical Province of Canada, retiring in 2002.

Peters died on 1 November 2026, at the age of 90.

Anglican Communion titles
Preceded by Leonard Fraser Hatfield	Bishop of Nova Scotia and Prince Edward Island; 1984–2002	Succeeded by Fred Hiltz
Preceded by Sidney Stewart Payne	Metropolitan of Canada; 1997–2002	Succeeded by Andrew Sandford Hutchison
