= Peggys Cove, Nova Scotia =

Rural community in Nova Scotia, Canada

Peggys Cove
- Rural community
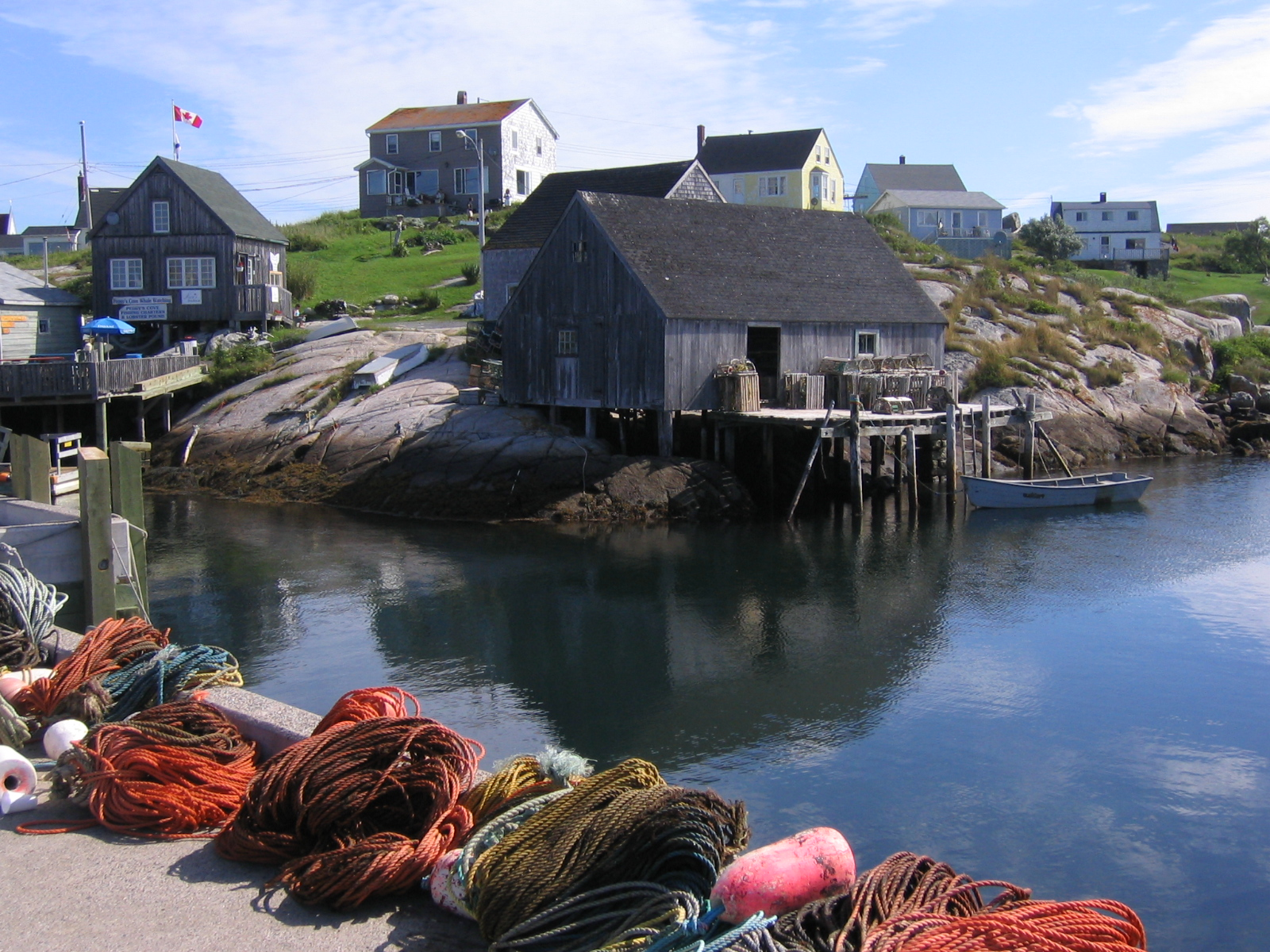
- Peggy's Cove Harbour in 2005

- Location of Peggy's Cove in Nova Scotia
- Coordinates: 44°29′34″N 63°55′03″W
- Country: Canada
- Province: Nova Scotia
- Administrative district: St. Margarets Bay
- Founded: 1811
- Elevation: 10 m (33 ft)
- Highest elevation: 15 m (49 ft)
- Lowest elevation: 0 m (0 ft)

Population (2011)
  - Total: 30 year-round residents; increases to 35 in summer season
- Time zone: UTC−4 (ATS)
  - Summer (DST): UTC−3 (Atlantic Daylight Saving Time)
- Area code(s): 902 & 782
- Highways: Route 333

Peggys Cove is a small, rural community located on the eastern shore of St. Margarets Bay in the Halifax Regional Municipality. It is the site of Peggys Cove Lighthouse, which was established in 1868.

== Geography ==
Peggys Cove is 43 kilometres (27 miles) southwest of Downtown Halifax and comprises one of the numerous small fishing communities located around the perimeter of the Chebucto Peninsula.

The community is named after the cove of the same name, a name also shared with Peggys Point, immediately to the east of the cove. The village marks the eastern point of the St. Margarets Bay.

== History ==
The first recorded name of the cove was Eastern Point Harbour or Peggs Harbour in 1766. The village is likely named after Saint Margaret's Bay (Peggy being a nickname for Margaret), which Samuel de Champlain named after his mother Marguerite Le Roy. There has been much folklore created to explain the name.

One story suggests the village may have been named after the wife of an early settler. The popular legend claims that the name came from the sole survivor of a shipwreck at Halibut Rock near the cove. Artist and resident William E. deGarthe said she was a young woman while others claim she was a little girl too young to remember her name and the family who adopted her called her Peggy. The young shipwreck survivor married a resident of the cove in 1800 and became known as "Peggy of the Cove", attracting visitors from around the bay who eventually named the village Peggys Cove, after her nickname.

The village was founded in 1811 when the province of Nova Scotia issued a land grant of more than 800 acres (320 ha) to six families of German descent. The settlers relied on fishing as the mainstay of their economy but also farmed where the soil was fertile. They used surrounding lands to pasture cattle. In the early 1900s the population peaked at about 300. The community supported a schoolhouse, church, general store, lobster cannery and boats of all sizes that were nestled in the cove.

Many artists and photographers flocked to Peggys Cove. As roads improved, the number of tourists increased. Today the population is smaller but Peggys Cove remains an active fishing village and a favourite tourist destination.

Roads and several homes were badly damaged at Peggys Cove in 2003 by the extensive flooding that accompanied Hurricane Juan, which also damaged the cove's breakwater. The breakwater was further washed away by Hurricane Bill in 2009, allowing waves to seriously damage a home and gift shop, and washed away one of the cove's characteristic wooden fish sheds.

In January 2021, the federal and provincial governments announced the construction of a $3.1 million accessible viewing platform at Peggys Cove, to open in June 2021. The large platform area officially opened in October 2021; while visitors are allowed to walk on the rocks too, the 1,300-square-metre deck area is safer. At that time, other changes were still pending, based on a draft Master Plan for infrastructure improvement.

== Tourism ==
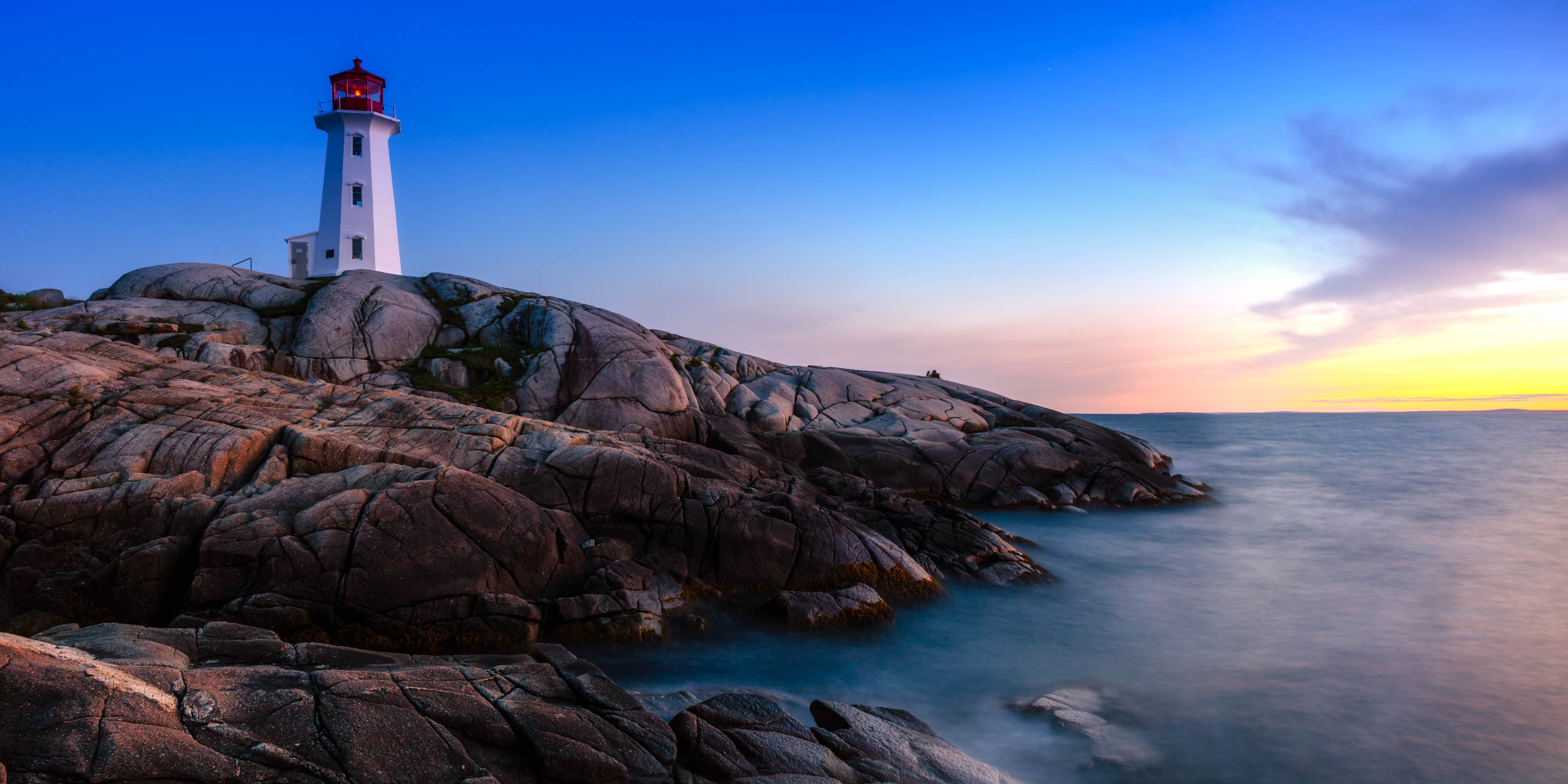
The lighthouse at Sunset

From its inception, the community's economy revolved around fishery. However, tourism began to overtake fishing in economic importance following the Second World War. Today, Peggys Cove is a major tourist attraction, although its inhabitants still fish for lobster, and the community maintains a rustic undeveloped appearance. The regional municipality and the provincial government have strict land-use regulations in the vicinity of Peggys Cove, with most property development being prohibited. Similarly there are restrictions on who can live in the community to prevent inflation of property values for year-round residents.

The historic Carpenter Gothic style St. John's Anglican Church, the only church in Peggys Cove, is a municipally designated heritage site.

The first public art gallery, tea-room, and gift shop was opened in a shack in Peggys Cove in 1937.

== Geology ==
View of Peggys Cove from The Whalesback, 1 km north of the community. St. Margaret's Bay is to the right, the Atlantic Ocean straight ahead.

More than 400 million years ago, in the Devonian Period, the plate tectonics movement of the Earth's crust allowed molten material to bubble up from the Earth's interior. This formed the rocks seen today and are part of the Great Nova Scotia batholith. The landscape of Peggys Cove and surrounding areas was subsequently carved by the migration of glaciers and the ocean tides.

About 20,000 years ago, an ice ridge moved south from Canada's Arctic region covering much of North America. Along with the ebb and flow of the glaciers, the ice ridge eventually melted and shifted and in the process scooped away and scoured large sections of rock, vegetation and topsoil. As melted land glaciers flowed back to the oceans the changing tidal flows and rising sea levels filled the scarred areas with water, forming coves and inlets.

Large boulders composed of 415-million-year-old Devonian granite, called glacial erratics, were lifted by the ice and carried for long distances before being deposited upon the landscape as the ice receded, leaving rugged barrens. The movement of the glacial ice and rocks left scouring marks in the bedrock that are still visible.

Peggys Cove has been declared a preservation area to protect its rugged beauty. The Peggys Cove Commission Act, passed in 1962, revised in 1989,, prohibits development in and around the surrounding village and restricts development within Peggys Cove. The area comprised about 2,000 acres (8.1 km^{2}) stretching from Indian Harbour to West Dover and includes barrens, bogs, inland ponds, and rocky coastline.

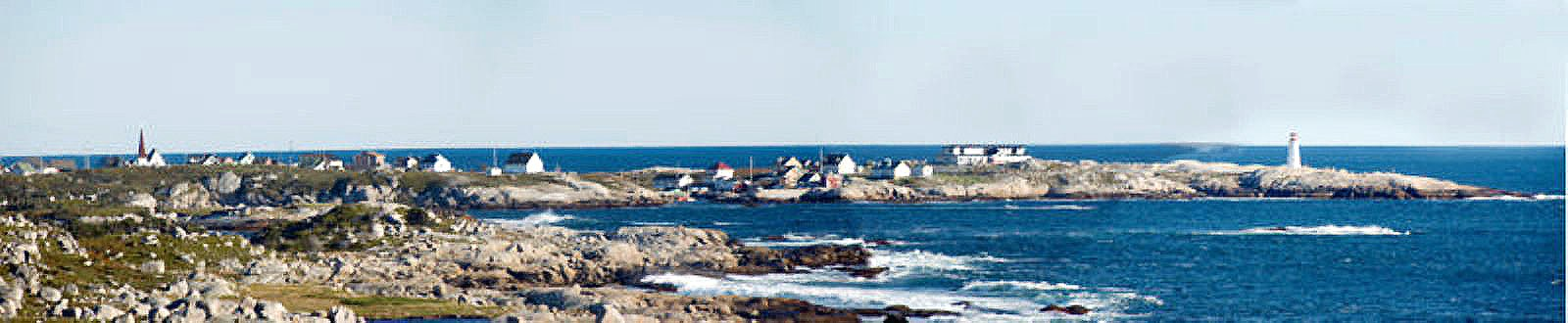
Peggys Cove from Swissair 111 Memorial Site

== Atlantic Ocean ==
The Atlantic tide runs about 1.5–2 metres (4 ft 11 in – 6 ft 7 in). The ocean temperature ranges between 12 and 20 °C (54 and 68 °F) in the summer and falls to between 0.5 and 4.5 °C (32.9 and 40.1 °F) in the winter. The ocean moderates the air temperature over the land year round.

The shape of the ocean floor and the numerous ocean currents facilitate a rich diversity of marine life along the Atlantic coastline. The Labrador Current flowing south from the Arctic cools the ocean during the summer months. Offshore, the Gulf Stream, travelling northwest from the Caribbean to the northern Europe warms the ocean waters. The confluence of currents off Nova Scotia brings unusual Arctic and tropical species to St. Margarets Bay. Marine life includes Atlantic bluefin tuna, white-sided and white-beaked dolphins, and Pinnipeds. Endangered Atlantic Leatherback sea turtles are seen in the waters near shore. Endangered right whales and many other species are found in the waters.

== Cultural impact ==
The cove was the scene of a youth novel by Bryan Doyle called You Can Pick Me up at Peggys Cove (1976), which was made into a film directed by Don McBrearty and into a video released by Beacon Films, Inc., in 1982.

In 2016 it was announced that a Peggys Cove–themed resort had opened in Thailand.

=== William deGarthe ===
Sculptor and painter William E. deGarthe lived in Peggys Cove. A gallery exhibiting his work is open to the public between May 1 and October 31 each year. Outside the gallery, in the William E. deGarthe Provincial Park, is a carved granite outcropping. This 30 m (98 ft) sculpture was carved by deGarthe as "a lasting monument to Nova Scotian fishermen". It depicts 32 fishermen, their wives, and children enveloped by the wings of Saint Elmo, the patron saint of sailors, as well as the legendary Peggy.

== Swissair Flight 111 ==
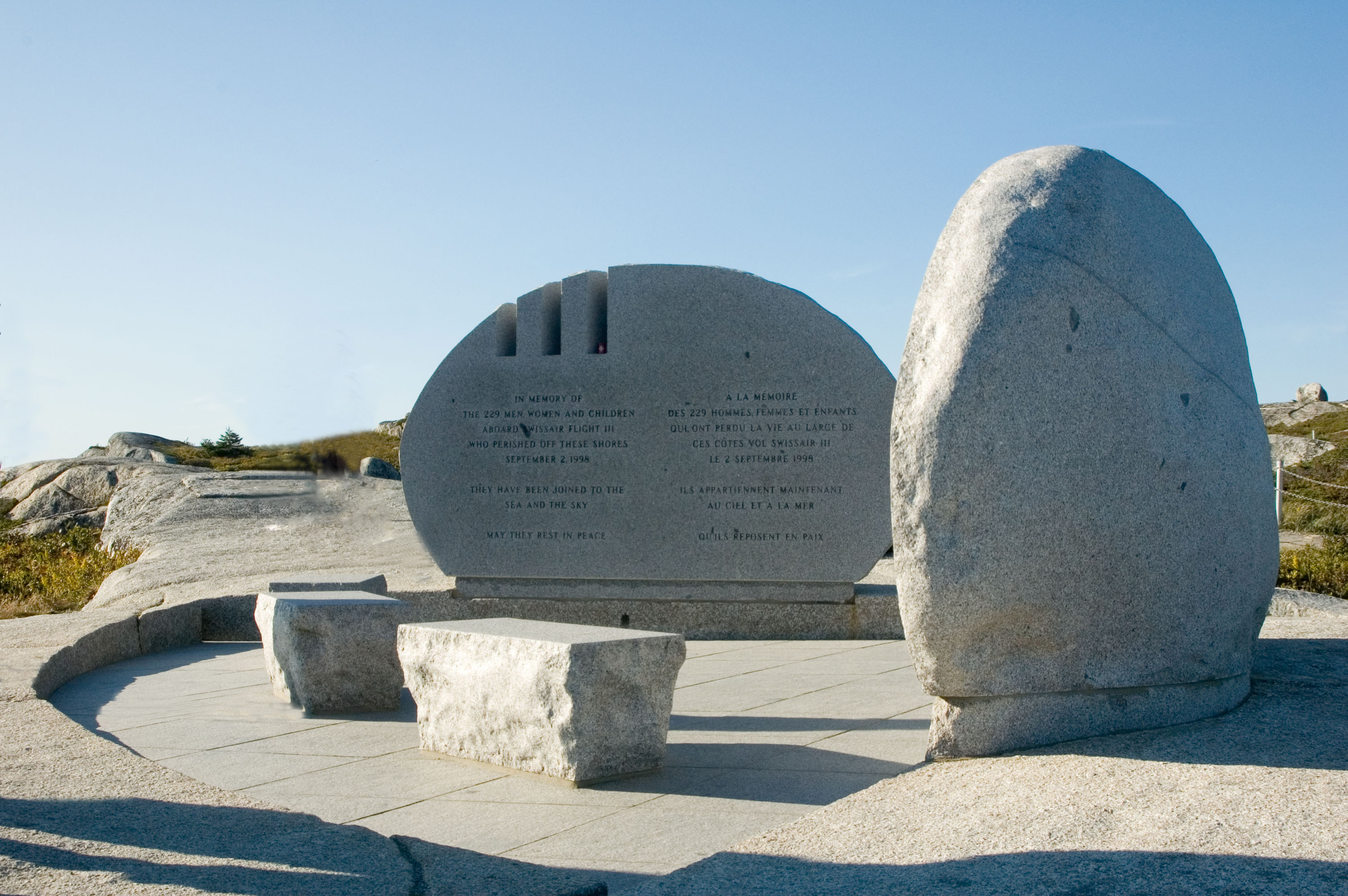
Swissair 111 memorial near Peggys Cove

On September 2, 1998, Swissair Flight 111 crashed into St. Margaret's Bay approximately eight kilometres (five miles) southwest of Peggys Cove with the loss of all 229 aboard. The cove became one of the staging areas for first responders that were involved in the search-and-rescue response, crash recovery operation, and investigation of the crash. Many of the CCGA volunteers that were first to approach the crash site were privately owned fishing boats that were operating out of Peggys Cove and surrounding harbours. In the days following the crash many families and media came to Peggys Cove to see the crash site. Some of the victims' family members were displeased with the plans for burial of unidentified remains, believing they should have been buried at the site of the memorial.

== Sources ==
- List of Lights 1870–1998 Canadian Coast Guard
- Peggys Cove Geological Guide Nova Scotia Department of Natural Resources
- HRM Civic Address Map
