= Halibut Rock =

Coordinates: 44°29′25.28″N 63°55′15.00″W

Halibut Rock, just off the rocky shore of Peggy's Cove Point, Nova Scotia, is a navigation hazard, lying slightly below the surface. Extreme low tides sometimes offer a quick glimpse of its flat surface protruding above the trough of a swell. Most times cresting waves reveal its location, just southwest of the lighthouse. Halibut Rock is charted on the Nautical Chart of St. Margaret's Bay D7-4386.
