= William Davis (bishop) =

Canadian Anglican bishop

William Wallace Davis , DD (10 December 1908 – 29 May 1987 ) was a Canadian Anglican bishop in the 20th century.

Davis was educated at the University of Bishop's College, Lennoxville and ordained in 1932. After a curacy at St Matthew, Ottawa he was the incumbent at Coaticook before becoming the Archdeacon of Quebec in 1947. He was Dean of Nova Scotia and Rector of the Cathedral Church of All Saints, Halifax from 1952 to 1958 when he became Bishop Coadjutor of Nova Scotia. He was appointed its full diocesan five years later. In 1972 he became Archbishop of Nova Scotia and Metropolitan of the Ecclesiastical Province of Canada, retiring in 1975.

Anglican Communion titles
Preceded by Robert Harold Waterman	Bishop of Nova Scotia; 1963 – 1975	Succeeded by George Feversham Arnold
Preceded by Alexander Henry O'Neil	Metropolitan of Canada; 1972 – 1975	Succeeded by Robert Lowder Seaborn
