= George Arnold (bishop) =

Canadian Anglican bishop

George Feversham Arnold (30 December 1914 – 31 January 1998) was a Canadian Anglican bishop in the 20th century.

Arnold was educated at Dalhousie University and ordained in 1938. He served at Louisbourg, St James Mahone Bay, St John's Fairview and Christ Church Windsor. He was bishop suffragan of Nova Scotia from 1967 to 1975, bishop coadjutor from May to September 1975 and its diocesan until 1979.

Religious titles
Preceded by William Wallace Davis	Bishop of Nova Scotia; 1975 – 1979	Succeeded by Leonard Fraser Hatfield
