= Thomas Shreve =

Anglican minister (1755–1816)

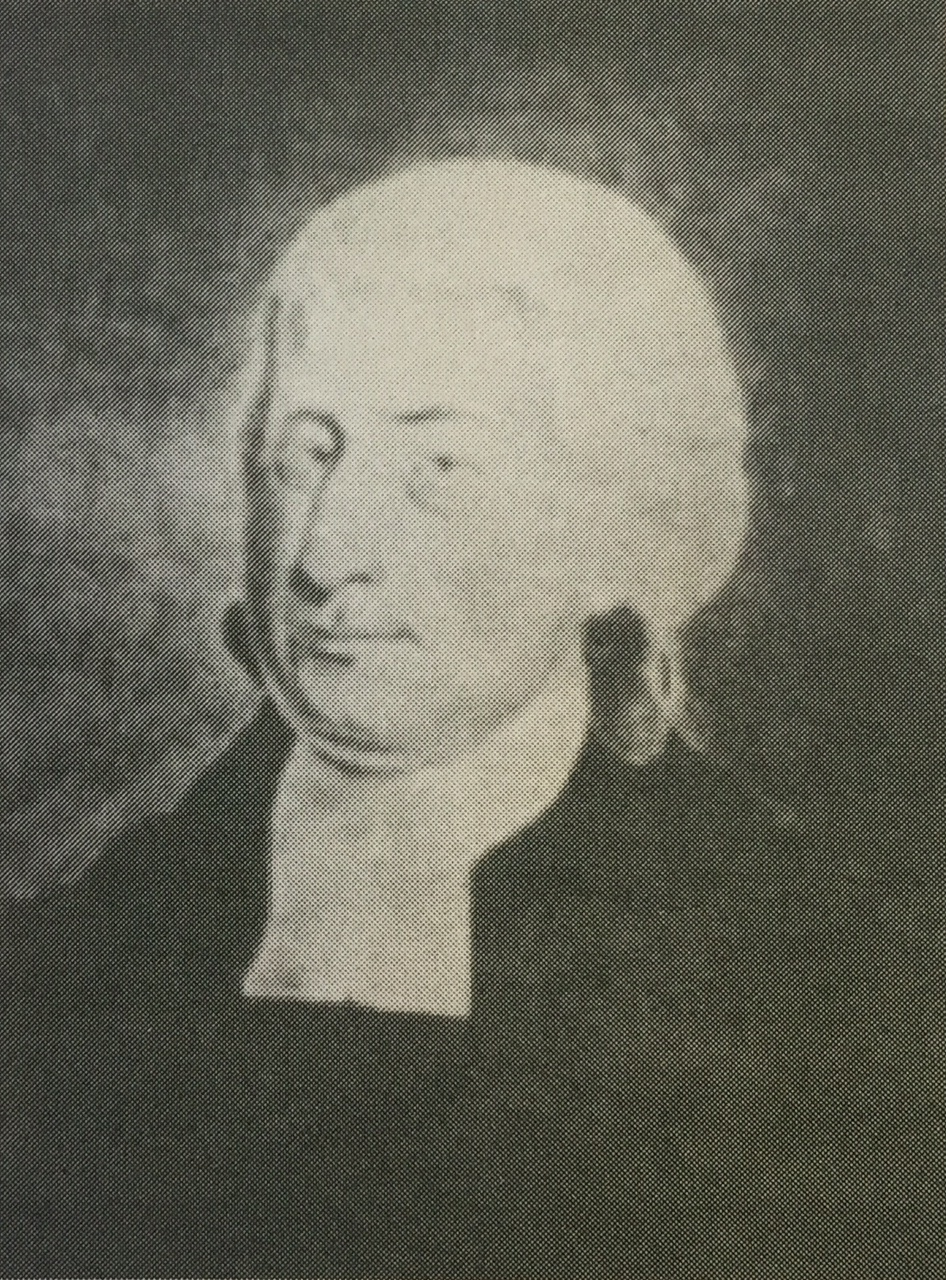
Rev. Thomas Shreve

Thomas Shreve (2 January 1755, New York – 21 August 1816, Lunenburg, Nova Scotia) was an 18th-century Anglican minister.

== Biography ==
Thomas Shreve was born on January 2, 1755. He studied at Anglican ministry at King's College. A loyalist during the Revolutionary War, he served as assistant barracks master in New York and was a captain in the De Lancey's Brigade and lieutenant in 82nd Regiment of Foot (1777).

After the war, he came to Nova Scotia and settled in Parrsboro, Nova Scotia (1874). He went to England to become a missionary and joined the Society for the Propagation of the Gospel in Foreign Parts and then returned to be rector at St. George's Anglican Church (Parrsboro, Nova Scotia) (1787). In 1803, he moved to Lunenburg, Nova Scotia, and served as their missionary for 13 years until his death on 21 August 1816. He was buried in the crypt of St. John's Anglican Church.
