= St. George's Anglican Church (Parrsboro, Nova Scotia) =

Coordinates: 45.4046°N 64.3261°W

St. George's Anglican Church Parrsboro, Nova Scotia Municipally Registered Property ID No. 14MNS0112 Listed: 9/28/1987
- St. George's Anglican Church Parrsboro, Nova Scotia; Municipally Registered Property; ID No. 14MNS0112 Listed: 9/28/1987

St. George's Anglican Church
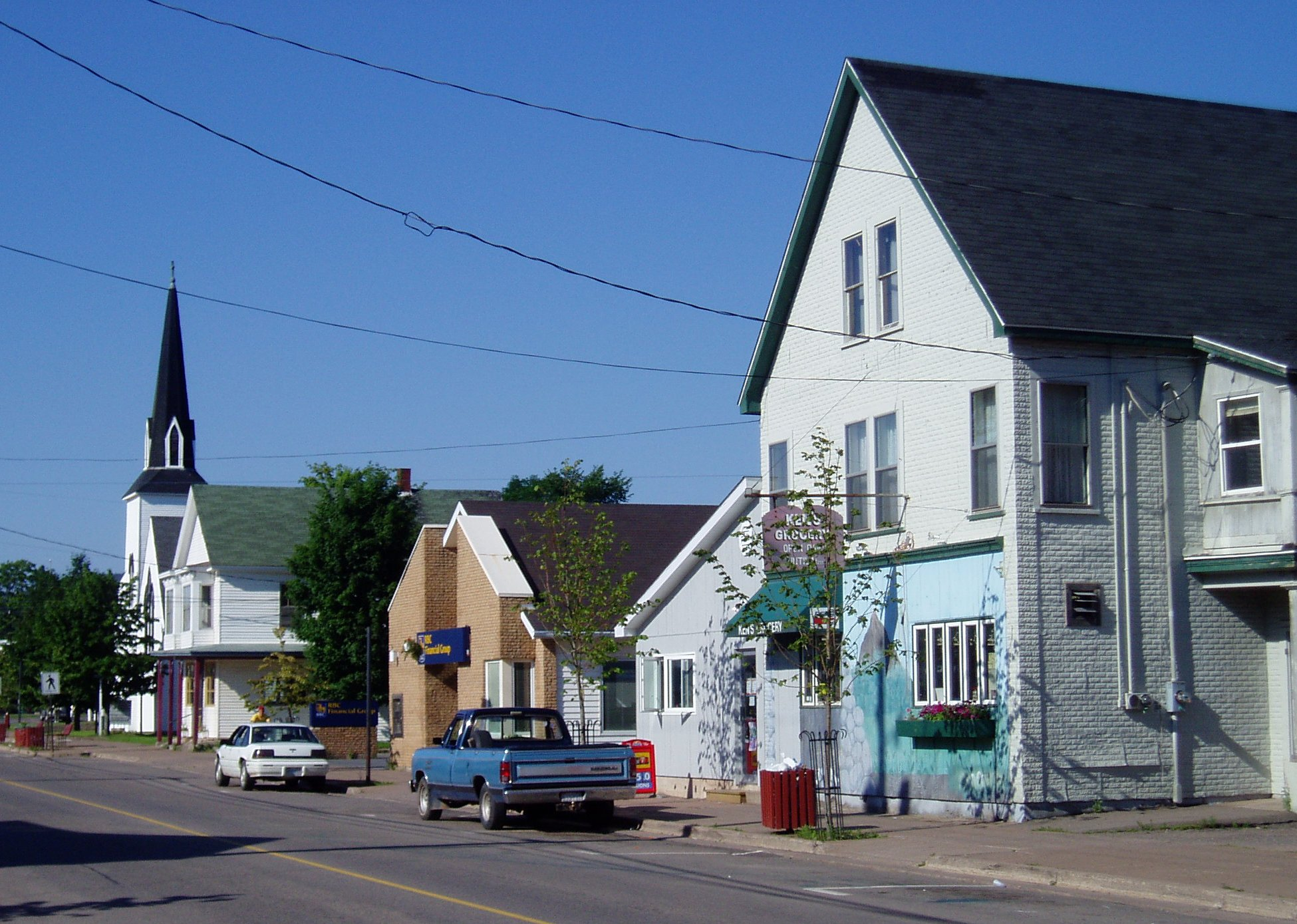
- Main Street Parrsboro with St. George's on the left
- Interactive map of the St. George's Anglican Church area

General information
- Architectural style: Carpenter Gothic
- Location: 216 Main Street; Parrsboro, Nova Scotia, Canada
- Completed: ca. 1865

Technical details
- Structural system: one-storey wood frame

Design and construction
- Architects: Thomas R. Corbett, builder

St. George's Anglican Church is an historic Carpenter Gothic style Anglican church building located at 216 Main Street in Parrsboro, Nova Scotia, Canada.

== History ==
Rev. Thomas Shreve, was the first rector of St. George's parish and stayed for 15 years (1787–1803).

Built around 1865, the current church's steep pitched roof, corner belfry with spire, and lancet windows are typical of Carpenter Gothic churches. St. George's is part of the Parrsboro/Port Greville Parish in the Anglican Diocese of Nova Scotia and Prince Edward Island. The Rev'd Tory Byrne is the rector. The present building is the third the church has had since its founding in 1786. St. George's is a municipally registered heritage site as designated by the City of Parrsboro on September 28, 1987.

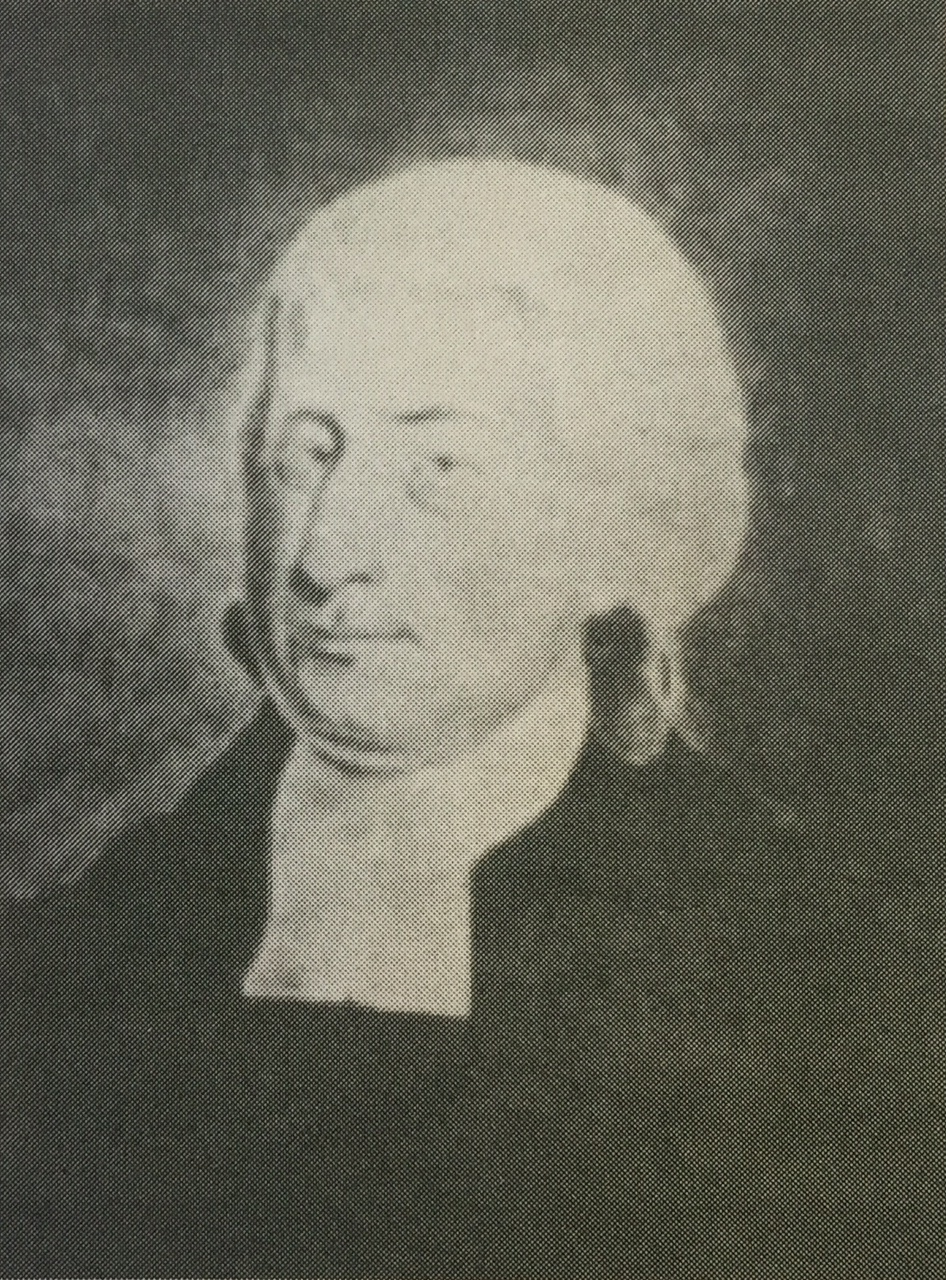
Rev. Thomas Shreve, First rector of St. George's (1787-1803)
