= Percy Coffin =

Percy David Coffin (b 1953) is the former Anglican Archbishop of the Diocese of Western Newfoundland, Canada.

Coffin was born in Joe Batt's Arm and educated at the Memorial University of Newfoundland.

Religious titles
Preceded by Leonard Whitten	Bishop of Western Newfoundland; 2003 – 2018	Succeeded by John Organ

Preceded by Claude Weston Miller	Metropolitan of Canada; 2014 – 2017	Succeeded by Ron Cutler
