= Claude Miller (bishop) =

Canadian Anglican bishop (1944–2023)

The Most Reverend Claude Miller
- Metropolitan of Canada; Archbishop of Fredericton
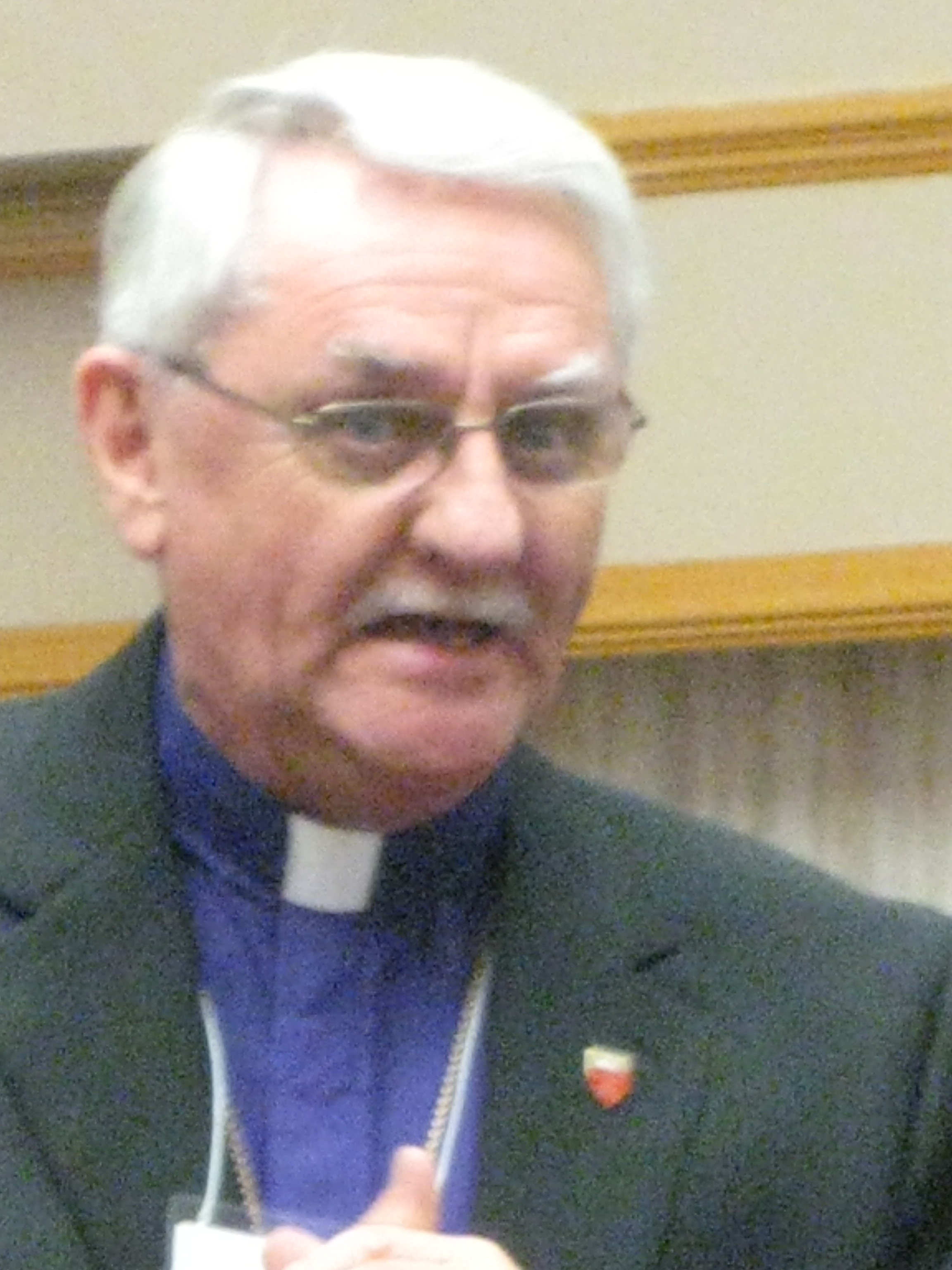
- Miller photographed in 2008.
- Church: Anglican Church of Canada
- Province: Canada
- Diocese: Fredericton
- In office: 2009–2014
- Predecessor: Bruce Stavert
- Successor: Percy Coffin
- Other post: Bishop of Fredericton (2003–2014)

Orders
- Consecration: 1988

Personal details
- Born: Claude Weston Miller; 26 June 1944 Bathurst, New Brunswick, Canada
- Died: 27 June 2023 (aged 79)
- Education: NB Institute of Technology, Atlantic School of Theology, Bangor Theological Seminary

Claude Weston Miller (26 June 1944 – 27 June 2023) was the ninth Anglican bishop (later archbishop) of Fredericton and Metropolitan of Canada. He retired on 26 June 2014 upon reaching his 70th birthday, and accepted the exceptional appointment as Episcopal Administrator until his successor, David Edwards, was consecrated as Bishop on 20 September 2014.

Miller was born in Bathurst, New Brunswick and worked in civil engineering until his calling to the priesthood. He was ordained in 1988, rising to the rank of Archdeacon by 2000. He and his wife Sharon have two daughters.

Miller died on 27 June 2023, at the age of 79.

Anglican Communion titles
Preceded by William Joseph Hockin	Bishop of Fredericton; 2003 – 2014	Succeeded by David Edwards
Preceded by Alexander Bruce Stavert	Metropolitan of Canada; 2009 – 2014	Succeeded by Percy Coffin
