= Len Whitten =

Leonard Whitten was the Anglican Bishop of Newfoundland and Labrador, Canada from 1997 to 2004.

Educated at the Memorial University of Newfoundland and ordained in 1962 he had previously served at Channel - Port aux Basques, Labrador, Gander Bay and Corner Brook.

Religious titles
Preceded by Sidney Stewart Payne	Bishop of Western Newfoundland; 1997 – 2003	Succeeded by Percy David Coffin
