= Leonard Hatfield =

Canadian Anglican bishop and author

Leonard Fraser Hatfield , DD (1 October 1919 - 14 September 2001) was a Canadian Anglican bishop and author in the 20th century.

Hatfield was educated at Dalhousie University and ordained in 1943. He served at Halifax (Cathedral Church of All Saints), Antigonish (Christ Church), Dartmouth (St. Anthony's) and Truro (St John's) -all in Nova Scotia. He was bishop suffragan of Nova Scotia from 1976; bishop coadjutor from 1979 and its diocesan until 1984. He retired in September 1984.

Religious titles
Preceded by George Feversham Arnold	Bishop of Nova Scotia; 1980 – 1984	Succeeded by Arthur Gordon Peters
