= Stewart Payne =

(Sidney) Stewart Payne was Anglican Archbishop of Newfoundland and Labrador and Metropolitan of Canada in the late 20th century.

Born on 6 June 1932 and educated at the Memorial University of Newfoundland he was ordained in 1957. He served at Happy Valley, Bay Roberts and St. Anthony. He was elevated to the episcopate in 1978.

Religious titles
| Preceded by William Gordon Legge | Bishop of Western Newfoundland; 1978 – 1997 | Succeeded by Leonard Whitten |
| Preceded by Reginald Hollis | Metropolitan of Canada; 1990– 1997 | Succeeded by Arthur Gordon Peters |
