= Fred Hiltz =

21st-century Canadian Anglican bishop and primate

The Most Reverend Fred Hiltz
- Primate Emeritus of the Anglican Church of Canada
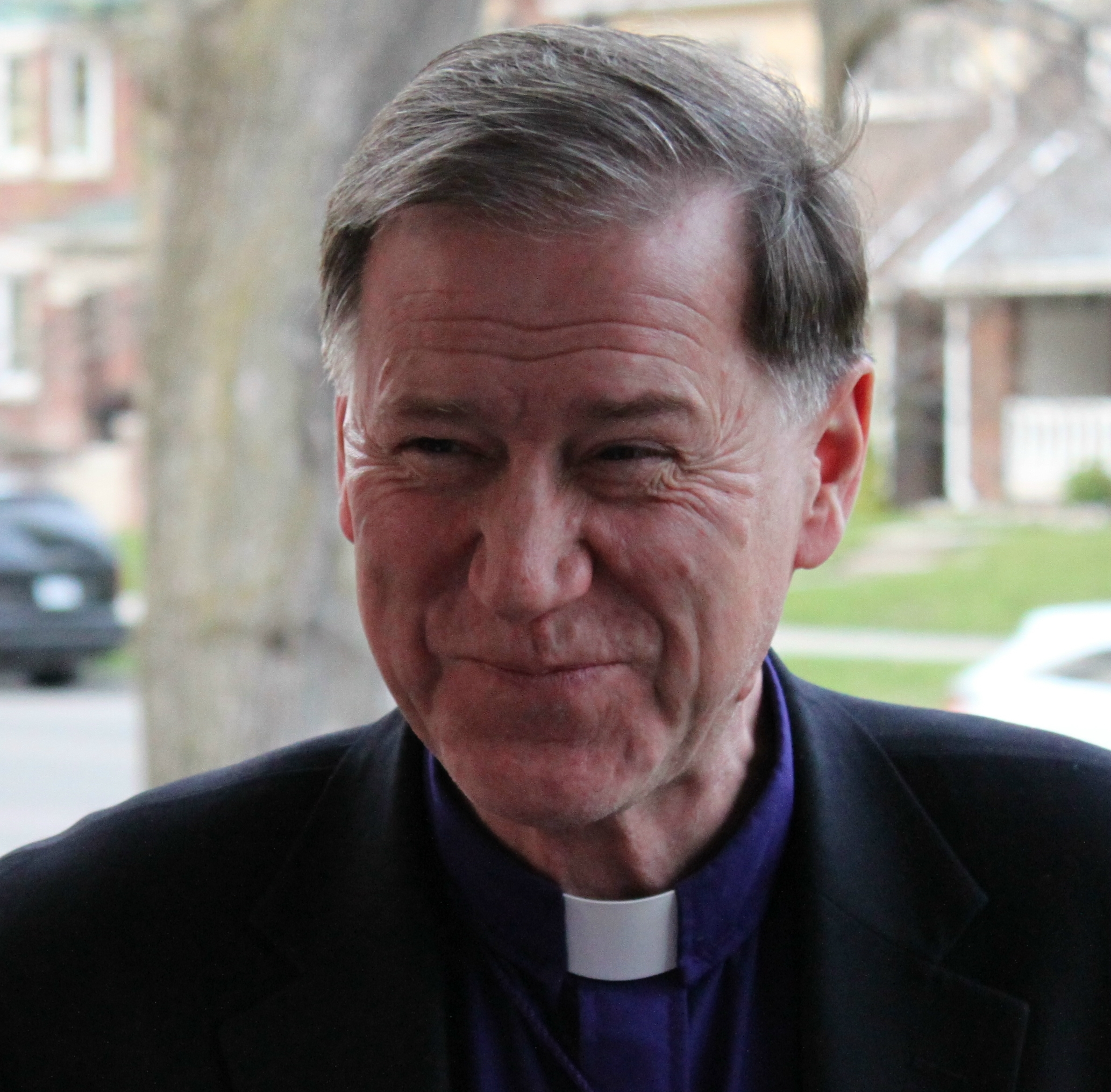
- Archbishop Hiltz in 2010
- Church: Anglican Church of Canada
- See: Extra-diocesan
- In office: 2007–2019
- Predecessor: Andrew Hutchison
- Successor: Linda Nicholls
- Other post: Bishop of Nova Scotia and Prince Edward Island (2002–2007)

Orders
- Ordination: 3 June 1977 (deacon); 29 June 1979 (priest)
- Consecration: 1994

Personal details
- Born: Frederick James Hiltz; 3 December 1953 (age 72) Dartmouth, Nova Scotia
- Spouse: Lynne Samways
- Children: 1

Frederick James Hiltz (born 3 December 1953) is a Canadian retired Anglican bishop. From 2007 to 2019, he served as Primate of the Anglican Church of Canada.

== Early life and education ==
Hiltz was born and raised in Dartmouth, Nova Scotia. He earned his Bachelor of Science degree at Dalhousie University in 1975 (major in biology) and a master of divinity degree at the Atlantic School of Theology in 1978. He received an honorary doctor of divinity degree in 2002 from the University of King's College, Halifax.

== Ordained ministry ==
Hiltz was ordained a deacon on 3 June 1977 and a priest on 29 June 1979. He served in several parishes in the Diocese of Nova Scotia and Prince Edward Island: Christ Church, Sydney; Melford-Guysborough; Timberlea-Lakeside; The Cathedral Church of All Saints, Halifax; and St. John's Church, Lunenburg.

In 1994, Hiltz was elected suffragan bishop (an assistant bishop without an automatic right of succession) of the Diocese of Nova Scotia and Prince Edward Island. He was consecrated as a bishop the same year. He became diocesan bishop in 2002. Since 2007, he has been Anglican co-chair of the Anglican-Lutheran International Commission.

=== Primate ===
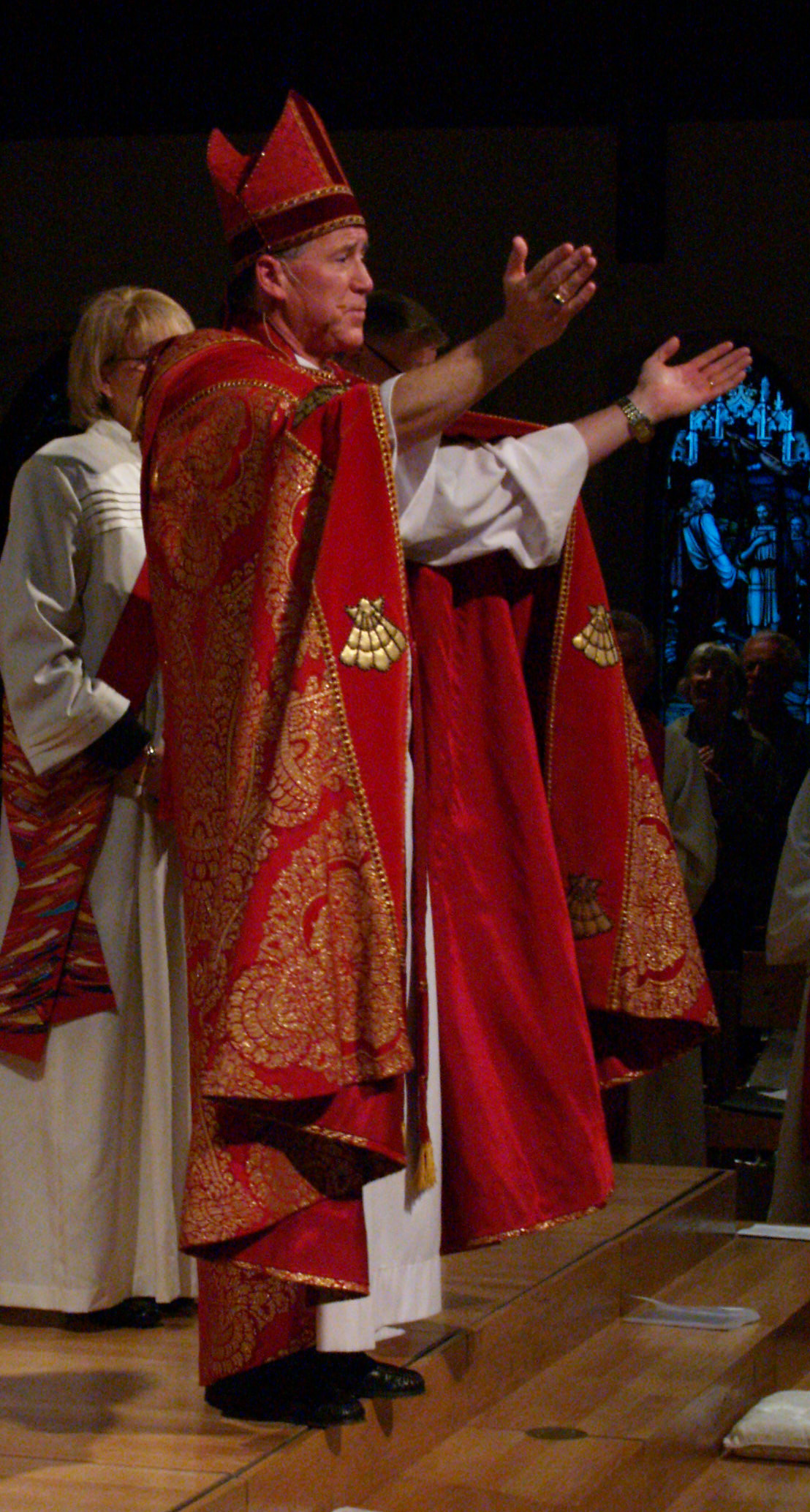
Hiltz presiding at an ordination in 2012

Hiltz was elected and installed as primate on 22 and 25 June, 2007 respectively. The Guardian newspaper described him as a "liberal-leaning bishop". He is considered a moderate theological liberal and opposes the death penalty. He supports, and voted in favour of, the blessing of same-sex unions at the 2007 General Synod that elected him.

In recent years, Hiltz has undertaken a televised joint Christmas message with the National Bishop of the Evangelical Lutheran Church in Canada, carrying into greater fulfillment past declarations of Anglican–Lutheran solidarity. In October 2009, he was reportedly dismayed by Pope Benedict XVI's invitation to welcome groups of disaffected Anglicans into the Roman Catholic Church.

Hiltz announced in January 2018 that he had submitted his notice of intention to resign as primate as of the conclusion of the 42nd General Synod in July 2019.

== Residential schools ==
In 2017, Hiltz issued a strongly-worded rebuke entitled "There was nothing good: An open letter to Canadian Senator Lynn Beyak" who had stated that Canadians ignore the "abundance of good" that happened in residential schools.

== Personal life ==
Hiltz enjoys caring for animals (two Labrador retrievers and a cat), reading, gardening, and woodworking. He is married to Lynne Samways Hiltz. They have one son, Nathan (age 35 as of 2016), who is a jazz guitarist and music teacher in Toronto.

Anglican Communion titles
Preceded by Arthur Peters	Bishop of Nova Scotia and Prince Edward Island; 2002–2007	Succeeded by Sue Moxley
Preceded by Andrew Hutchison	Primate of the Anglican Church of Canada; 2007–2019	Succeeded by Linda Nicholls
