= Sandra Fyfe =

Canadian Anglican Bishop

Sandra Boutilier Fyfe was installed as the Bishop of the Diocese of Nova Scotia and Prince Edward Island, Canada on 30 November (Saint Andrew's Day), 2020.

Fyfe began her post-secondary education in 1984 and completed the Foundation Year Program at University of King's College, before going on to obtain a bachelor’s degree in public relations from Mount Saint Vincent University in 1988. She worked in that field for several years with healthcare and post-secondary institutions, as well as the Women’s Policy Office with the Government of Newfoundland and Labrador. In 2000 she earned an M.Div from Queen’s Theological College (with honours) in St. John’s, NL. She was ordained as a deacon in 2000 at The Cathedral of St. John the Evangelist in St. John’s, NL, and as a priest in 2001 at St. Thomas Anglican Church in St. John’s, NL. She has served as curate at St. Thomas Church in St. John's, rector at Christ Church in Shelburne and priest in charge of the parishes of St. James Church in Kentville and Lockeport-Barrington. In 2009 she became the rector of the Parish of Horton, St. John’s Church, Wolfville. She was archdeacon of the South Shore region until 2009 and archdeacon of the Valley region until 2017.

She was elected to the episcopacy on September 12, 2020 during a vacancy of see following Archbishop Ronald Cutler's retirement in the midst of the COVID-19 pandemic. Due to strict Public Health restrictions no congregation was permitted to gather for her consecration, but just over 4,000 joined to watch the live broadcast.

Religious titles
Preceded by Ronald Cutler	Bishop of Nova Scotia and Prince Edward Island; 2020 – present	Incumbent
