= William E. deGarthe =

Finnish painter (1907–1983)

William Edward deGarthe
- Born: Birger Edward Degerstedt; 14 April 1907; Kaskinen (Kaskö), Ostrobothnia, Finland
- Died: 13 February 1983 (aged 75); Toronto, Ontario, Canada
- Resting place: Peggy's Cove, Nova Scotia, Canada
- Education: Museum of Fine Art, Montreal; Academie de la Grand Chaumiere, Paris; Accademie di Belle Arti, Rome
- Known for: Painter, graphic artist, sculptor, muralist, writer
- Notable work: Looking for the Mothership (1955); Approaching Storm (1959); Fishermen's Memorial Monument, Peggy's Cove (1977-1983)
- Movement: Realism, Impressionism, Post-Impressionism
- Spouse: Phoebe Agnes Payne 1935-1983 (his death)

William Edward deGarthe (1907–1983) was a Finnish-Canadian painter and sculptor who lived for much of his life in Peggy's Cove, Nova Scotia.

== Early life ==
William deGarthe (1907–1983) was born Birger Edward Degerstedt in Kaskinen, also known as Kaskö (Swedish), a remote island town off the northwest coast of Finland. He was the son of Edward Degerstedt, a Swedish-speaking school principal and artist. The third-oldest in a family of five brothers, deGarthe was competitive and athletic but demonstrated an early aptitude for art. After graduating from high school with his strongest marks in art and drawing, deGarthe studied art in Helsinki while awaiting his call-up for active duty in the Finnish military.

After his release from service, deGarthe obtained his passport – declaring his profession as "artist"—and emigrated to Canada in the fall of 1926. Landing in Halifax, Nova Scotia, he boarded a train for Toronto, Ontario intending to join other expatriate Scandinavians in the northern Ontario forestry trade. The work was hard and the climate unforgiving; after only two months he left the woods bound for Montreal, Quebec. Virtually penniless, he made his way to a mission where he showed the supervisor some of his drawings. Impressed with the work and with the 19-year-old's determination, the man introduced deGarthe to a local publisher who hired him as an illustrator in January 1927 at a rate of $7 a week.

It was around this time that the young artist changed his name from the Scandinavian Degerstedt to the French-sounding deGarthe. While continuing his work as a commercial artist, deGarthe continued his formal art studies in Montreal at the Museum of Fine Art under Edmond Dyonnet but the restless young man was still seeking something more. Declaring he was on a quest to find "the most beautiful spot on earth", in 1930 deGarthe quit his job in Montreal with the goal of sailing to Brazil to join an aunt there. He travelled by rail to Halifax to board a ship bound for South America but on disembarking he was struck by the similarity between Nova Scotia and the rugged seacoast of his native Finland. He later declared, "I didn't have to travel any farther."

== Painting ==
Soon after his arrival in Nova Scotia, deGarthe was introduced to Frank Wallace, a prominent Halifax marketing executive who immediately offered him a job as a commercial illustrator. deGarthe would continue to work for Wallace Advertising for the next 15 years before launching his own advertising company, deGarthe Advertising Art, in 1945; however, it was the onset of World War II that rekindled his passion for fine art.

Biographer Douglas Pope recounts that when the Soviet Red Army invaded Finland in November 1939 deGarthe was determined to return to his homeland to fight. With his four other sons already enlisted, Edward Degerstedt begged his middle child to stay in Canada. Inspired by the work of Alex Colville and other prominent Canadian war artists, deGarthe resolved to use his art to inspire others. Around 1940 he began painting under the tutelage of Leonard Brooks.

Over the next few years deGarthe would study oil painting under Stanley Royle at Mount Allison University in Sackville, New Brunswick. deGarthe later studied marine painting in Rockport, Massachusetts under Stanley Woodward, followed by Emile Gruppe in East Gloucester, Massachusetts and George Groz at the Art Students League in New York City. He also spent many winters studying in Europe at the Academie de la Grand Chaumiere in Paris as well as Académie Julian in Paris and the Accademie di Belle Arti in Rome.

Throughout his career de Garthe worked in many mediums; however he is best known for his atmospheric oil paintings depicting scenes of life on and around the rugged Nova Scotia coast. He also completed works in charcoal, pen and ink, lithograph and fresco and, in later life, sculpture. Beginning in 1942 deGarthe taught commercial art at the Nova Scotia College of Art, now Nova Scotia College of Art and Design University (NSCAD), later teaching younger students at the city's YMCAs and YWCAs and at his own studio.

deGarthe became a prominent member of the Nova Scotia arts community and a strong promoter of the province's artistic tradition. In the early forties he joined a lively "round table" of Halifax's most influential artists including gallery owners Marguerite and LeRoy Zwicker, prominent editorial cartoonist Robert Chambers, photographer Robert Norwood and war artist Brooks.

During his career deGarthe created a number of important works in oils, notable among them Looking for the Mothership, an evocative 1955 painting depicting a dory carrying a lone fisherman, searching for his lost home schooner. The same year, the Nova Scotia Museum of Fine Arts, now the Art Gallery of Nova Scotia, acquired its first deGarthe painting, Out of the Hurricane. In 1963, deGarthe created two large murals for St. John's Anglican Church in Peggy's Cove. The canvasses, 136 x 210 cm, depict a fishing boat on stormy seas with four fishers appearing to reach out to a figure of Christ on the water, surrounded by 12 gulls.

deGarthe created Harvesting the Sea for a Nova Scotia Light and Power cover in 1966. (Detail)

In 1970, deGarthe created what he considered to be his finest painting, Out of the Mist, a work Pope called a "simplified, condensed and more charged version of earlier themes", depicting a schooner in full sail emerging from the fog, seeming "to owe its existence to two worlds, the seen and the unseen, the world of fact and the world of fancy." deGarthe refused to sell the painting and it remains on display in his Peggy's Cove gallery.

In 1958, deGarthe exhibited 138 works at the Halifax Memorial Library in a show sponsored by the Nova Scotia Museum of Fine Arts, now the Art Gallery of Nova Scotia. In 1959 over 100 of his paintings were exhibited at the Queen Elizabeth Hotel in Montreal. His painting "Approaching Storm" was voted most popular at the 1959 Maritime Art Exhibition at the Beaverbrook Art Gallery in Fredericton, New Brunswick, Canada. His work was also shown in Toronto, London, Florida and Barbados.

deGarthe's work became popular among individual and corporate collectors; he sold his first painting to the Imperial Bank of Canada, now the Canadian Imperial Bank of Commerce, in 1949. In 1951, Nova Scotia Light and Power Company, Limited (NSLP) commissioned deGarthe to paint a Nova Scotia seascape for the cover of its annual report. Pleased with the result, the artist and company would continue their relationship for another two decades. In all, deGarthe created 21 paintings for NSLP. Most depicted scenes of the Atlantic coast, including fishers at work and sailing vessels, but a series of four covers from 1953 to 1956 featured scenes of Halifax Harbour. Beginning in 1959, NSLP produced fine art prints of deGarthe's work which it made available at no cost upon request. For many years, framed copies of deGarthe's paintings for NSLP were a common sight in Nova Scotia homes and offices.

deGarthe authored and illustrated three books: This is Peggy's Cove Nova Scotia (1956), Painting the Sea (1969), and The Story of the Herring Gull: Larus Argentatus (1977).

== Sculpture ==
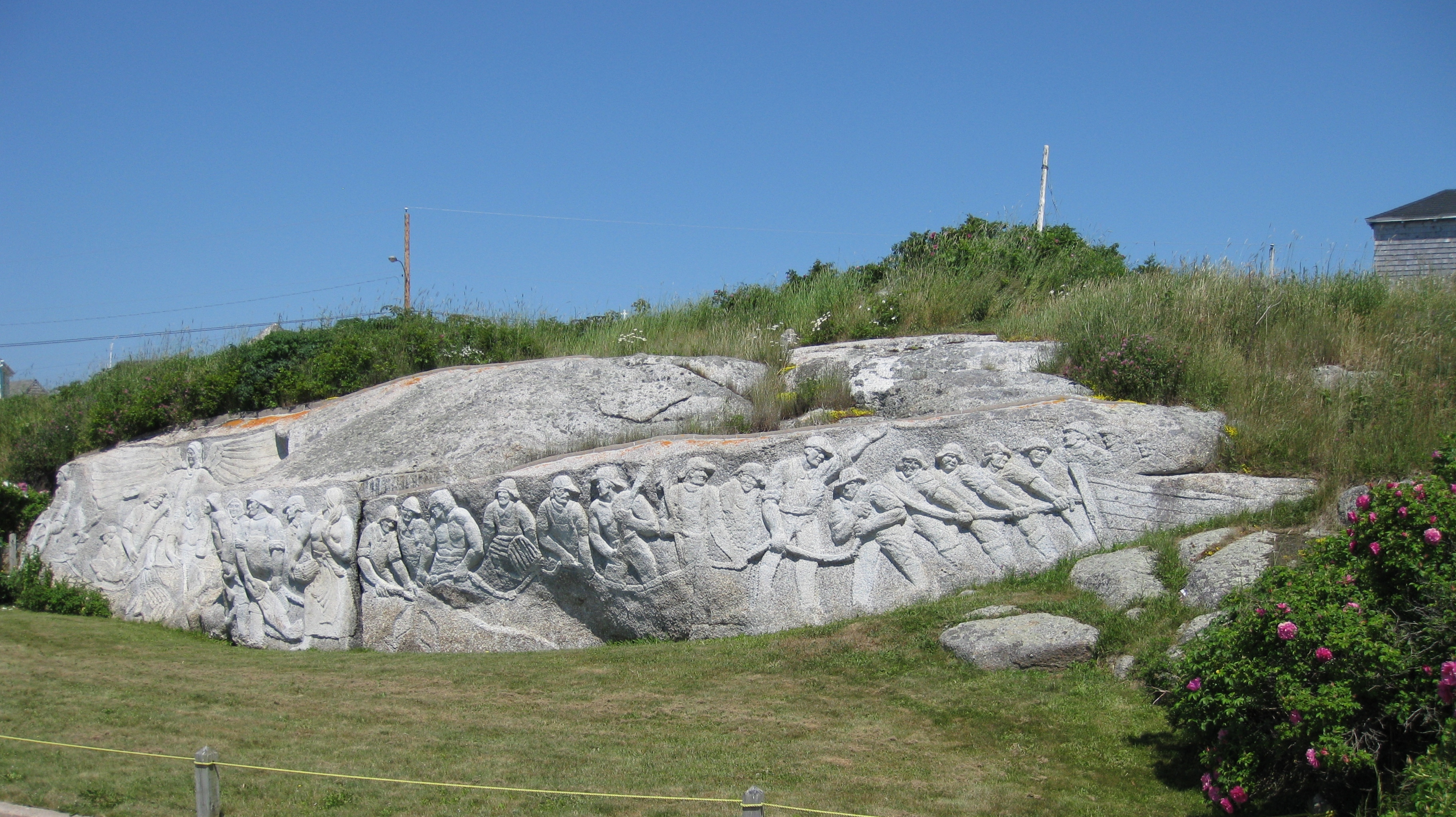
Fishermen's Monument at Peggy's Cove, Nova Scotia, Canada by William Edward deGarthe. Carved on-site from granite in-situ. (detail)

In 1962, deGarthe wintered in Florida where he studied sculpture under the direction of Leslie Thomas Posey (1900-1985) at the Longboat Key Center for the Arts. He later studied sculpting in marble at Pietrasanta in Tuscany.

In the late 1970s, deGarthe began a ten-year project to sculpt a "lasting monument to Nova Scotia fishermen" on a 30 m (100 ft) granite outcropping behind his Peggy's Cove Home. In 1976 deGarthe invited one of his students, J. Rene Barrette (Lt. Col. Retd) to help him with the sculpture. They worked together for 5 years. The project was about 80-per cent complete when the artist died in 1983.

With deGarthe's approval, Rene Barrette documented their progress on the sculpture in journals that were printed and sold to tourists who gathered around to watch the two artists at work.

The work depicts thirty-two fishermen and their wives and children enveloped by the wings of the guardian angel St. Elmo. It also features the image of Peggy, a legendary late-18th century shipwreck survivor deGarthe believed gave her name to the village. deGarthe bequeathed the sculpture to the province of Nova Scotia and it can be viewed in a park located behind his former home.

== deGarthe gallery ==
deGarthe's Peggy's Cove home has been transformed into the William E. deGarthe Gallery where 65 of his paintings and sculptures are on permanent exhibition. It is open from May 1 until October 31 each year. The gallery is part of the Nova Scotia Museum network. Although none of the works at the gallery is for sale, the North Shore Historic Art Gallery in nearby Lunenburg carries deGarthe's work.

A permanent display of deGarthe painting is exhibited at the Nova Scotia Archives in Halifax. His works are also in the collection of the Art Gallery of Nova Scotia and the Barbados Museum as well as numerous private collections around the world.

== Personal life ==
deGarthe became a Canadian citizen in 1934. In 1935 he met weaver and editor Phoebe Agnes Payne (1906-2008) at a house party and within a few months they married.

In 1931 deGarthe visited Peggy's Cove, a rugged and picturesque fishing village near Halifax, for the first time. Inspired by the community's stark beauty, deGarthe and his wife bought a summer home there in 1948. He was to visit there frequently to paint and exhibit his work. In 1955 deGarthe closed his city advertising business and moved to Peggy's Cove permanently. He would remain there for the rest of his life, rebuilding his studio after it was destroyed by Hurricane Ginny in 1963.

deGarthe and his wife were seasoned travellers, spending winters in the Caribbean and Florida, and visiting Spain, Portugal, Italy, Africa, and the Galapagos Islands among other places. In 1975, 35 years after he first embarked for Brazil, he finally reached Rio de Janeiro where the sight of the statue of Christ the Redeemer inspired him to create his own monument in stone in Peggy's Cove.

Health problems in the last years of his life slowed deGarthe's progress on the Fishermen's Monument. He suffered a heart attack in 1979 and was diagnosed with cancer in 1982. He died in a Toronto hospital on February 13, 1983. His funeral was held at Peggy's Cove and his ashes interred inside the Fishermen's Monument.
