= Diocese of Western Newfoundland =

Diocese of the Anglican Church in Canada

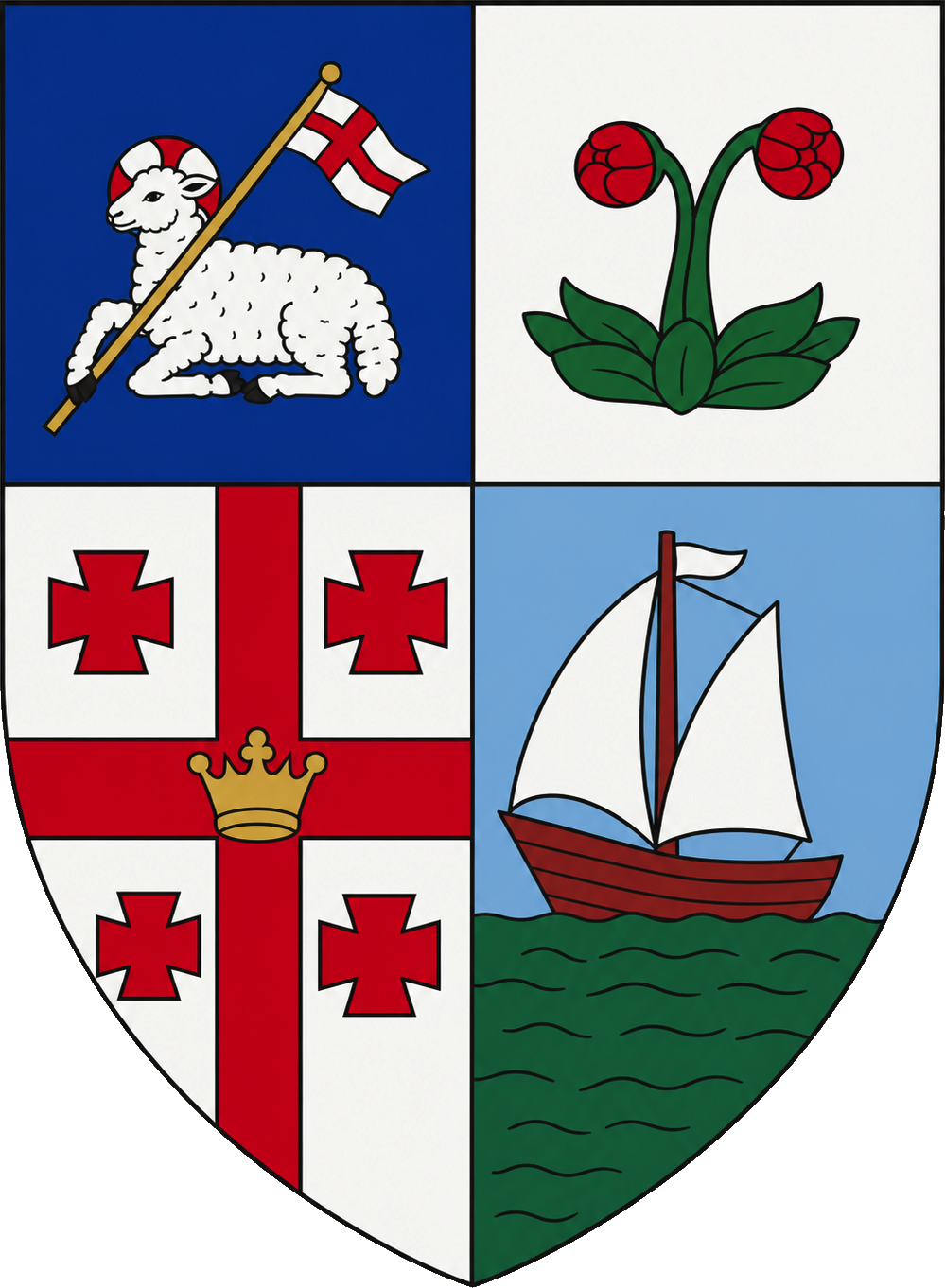

Location
- Ecclesiastical province: Canada
- Coordinates: 49.756°N 57.415°W

Statistics
- Parishes: 30 (2022)
- Members: 16,360 (2022)

Information
- Rite: Anglican
- Cathedral: Cathedral of St. John the Evangelist, Corner Brook

Current leadership
- Bishop: Vacant

Map
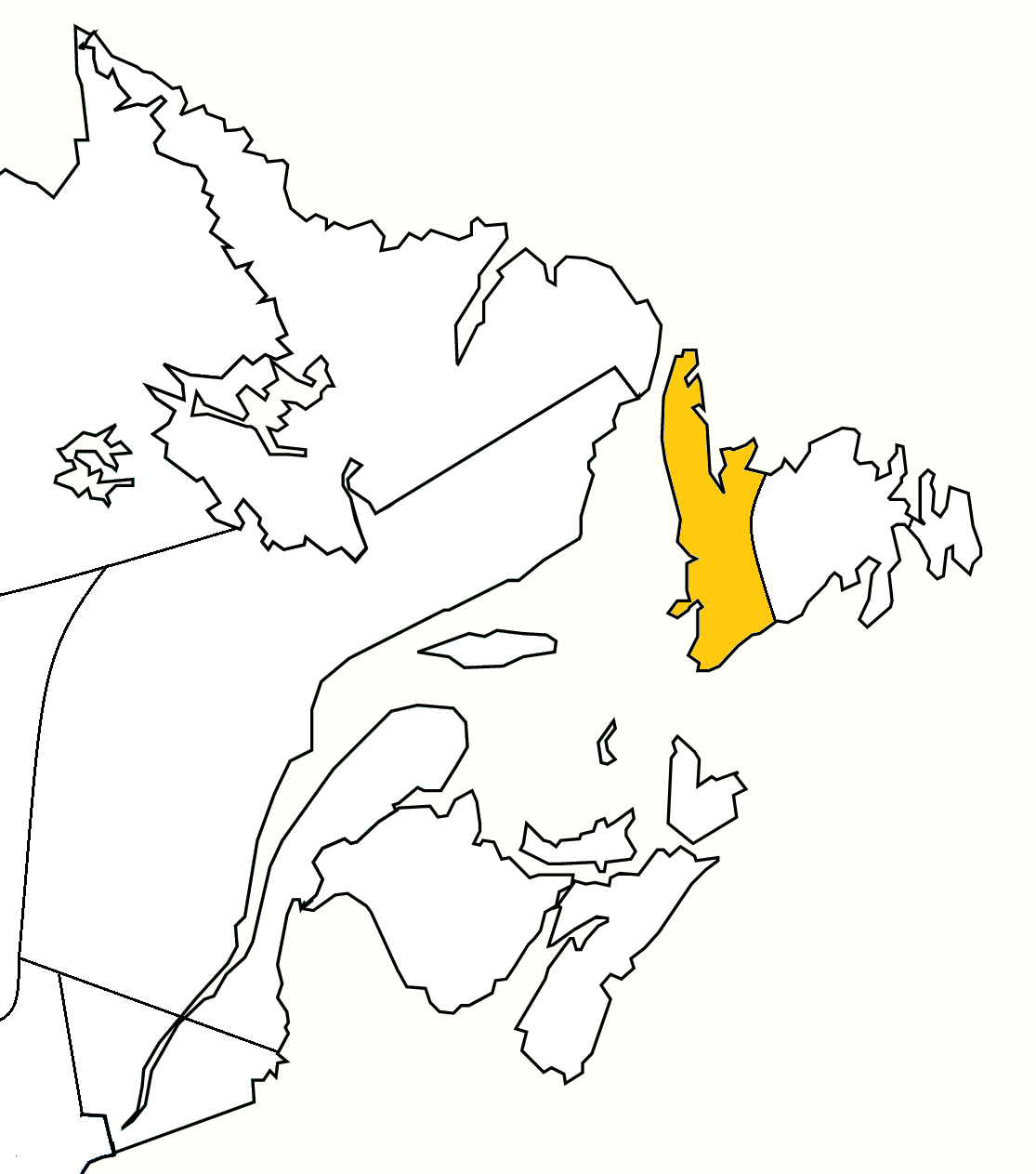
- Boundaries of the diocese within the Ecclesiastical Province of Canada

Website
- westernnewfoundland.anglican.org

The Anglican Diocese of Western Newfoundland is a diocese of the Ecclesiastical Province of Canada of the Anglican Church of Canada. It comprises 77 congregations grouped in 30 parishes in Western Newfoundland, with approximately 17,888 souls. Most parishes are multipoint – with more than two congregations – with only one full-time clergy. As of 2012, the diocese had 20 full-time and over 350 lay ministers. As of 2019, this Diocese allows clergy to officiate same-sex marriages.

== Bishops ==
- William Legge (1976–1978; previously bishop suffragan in the Diocese of Newfoundland)
- Stewart Payne (1978–1997); Metropolitan of Canada, 1990–1997
- Len Whitten (1997–2003)
- Percy Coffin (2003–2018); Metropolitan of Canada, 2014–2017
- John Organ (2018–2025)

== Parishes ==
- Parish Of All Saints,
- Parish Of Bay Of Islands,
- Parish Of Bay St. George,
- Parish Of Bonne Bay North,
- Parish Of Bonne Bay South,
- Parish Of By the Sea,
- Parish Of Cow Head,
- Parish Of Cox's Cove/McIver's,
- Parish Of Deer Lake,
- Parish Of Flowers Cove,
- Parish Of Forteau,
- Parish Of Grand Bay,
- Parish Of Green Island,
- Parish Of Isle Aux Morts,
- Parish Of Meadows,
- Parish Of Pasadena/Cormack,
- Parish Of Pisolet Bay,
- Parish Of Plum Point,
- Parish Of Port Saunders,
- Parish Of Rose Blanche,
- Parish Of Seal Cove,
- Parish Of St. Anthony,
- Parish Of St. Augustine,
- Parish Of St. James the Apostle,
- Parish Of St. John The Evangelist,
- Parish Of St. Luke,
- Parish Of St. Mary The Virgin,
- Parish Of St. Michael & All Angels,
- Parish Of Stephenville Crossing,
- Parish Of White Bay,
