= William Legge (bishop) =

Canadian Anglican priest and bishop

- Born: 20 January 1913
- Died: 13 January 1999 (aged 85)
- Occupation: Bishop

William Gordon Legge (20 January 1913 – 13 January 1999) was an Anglican priest and bishop in Newfoundland and Labrador, Canada. He was the first bishop of the Diocese of Western Newfoundland, serving from 1976 to 1978.

He was ordained as a priest in 1938. After a curacy at Channel he held incumbencies at Botwood and Bell Island. He was Archdeacon of Avalon from 1955 to 1968 when he became a suffragan bishop.

Church of England titles
New diocese	Bishop of Western Newfoundland; 1976 – 1978	Succeeded by Sidney Stewart Payne
