= Cathedral of St. John the Evangelist (Corner Brook) =

Church in Newfoundland and Labrador, Canada

Coordinates: 48.95°N 57.95°W

The Cathedral of St. John the Evangelist is the Anglican cathedral of the Diocese of Western Newfoundland. It is in the city of Corner Brook.
