= Fulford =

Fulford may refer to:

== Places ==
- Fulford, Quebec, Canada
- Fulford, North Yorkshire, England
- Fulford, Somerset, England
- Fulford, Staffordshire, England
- Fulford, Colorado, United States
- Fulford, Florida, United States

== Other uses ==
- Fulford (surname)
- Battle of Fulford

== See also ==
- The F***ing Fulfords, a documentary about Francis Fulford, a landowner in Devon
- Fulford Harbour, British Columbia, Canada
- Fulford Place, a mansion in Ontario, Canada
- Great Fulford, Devon, England
- Little Fulford, Devon, England
