= Fulford (surname) =

Fulford is an English surname that derives from any of the places called "Fulford" such as in Devon, Somerset, Staffordshire and Yorkshire. People with the name include:

- Sir Adrian Fulford (born 1953), Lord Justice Fulford, British judge
- Alicia Fulford-Wierzbicki, New Zealand actress
- Braxton Fulford (born 1998), American baseball player
- Christopher Fulford (born 1955), British actor
- Francis Fulford (landowner) (born 1952), English landowner and reality TV star of The F***ing Fulfords
- George Taylor Fulford (1852–1905), Canadian politician
- Henry English Fulford, a.k.a. Harry English Fulford, (1859–1929), British diplomat in China
- James Fulford (1841–1922), Australian politician
- Margaret Hannah Fulford (1904–1999), American botanist
- Michael Fulford (born 1948), British archaeologist
- Millie Hughes-Fulford (1945–2021), American astronaut
- Robert Fulford (journalist) (1932–2024), Canadian journalist
- Robert Fulford (croquet player) (born 1969)
- Robert C. Fulford (1905–1997), American osteopathic physician
- John Fulford (English priest) (died 1518), priest
- John Fulford (captain) of HMS Ganges (1821) under Rear-Admiral Baynes

- Fulford Harbour, British Columbia, named for Captain Fulford

== See also ==
- Fulford (disambiguation)
- Fulton (surname)
