= Francis Fulford =

Francis Fulford may refer to:

- Francis Fulford (politician) (1583–1664), MP for Devon
- Francis Fulford (bishop) (1803–1868), Anglo-Catholic bishop of Montreal
- Francis Fulford (landowner) (born 1952), British landowner and television personality
