= Life Is Toff =

- Genre: Factual
- Starring: Francis Fulford; Arthur Fulford; Matilda Fulford; Humphrey Fulford; Edmund Fulford
- Country of origin: United Kingdom
- Original language: English
- No. of series: 1
- No. of episodes: 6

Production
- Producers: James Quinn and Nicholas Kent
- Running time: 30 minutes
- Production companies: Oxford Film and Television

Original release
- Network: BBC Three
- Release: 28 October – 2 December 2014

Life Is Toff is a 2014 documentary-style reality television series, following the family of Francis Fulford.

The Fulford family have resided at their Devon country seat, Great Fulford, since the reign of King Richard I. The house is the setting for the six-part documentary following Francis Fulford and his four children: Arthur, Matilda, Humphrey, and Edmund. His wife Kishanda does not appear on camera.

Episode 1: "First Born "

- Air date 28 October

Episode 2: "Bear Up"

- Air date 4 November

Episode 3: "Cheese"

- Air date 11 November

Episode 4: "The Show"

- Air date 18 November

Episode 5: "Murder"

- Air date 25 November

Episode 6: "Ghosts"

- Air date 2 December

== See also ==
- The F***ing Fulfords
