= The F***ing Fulfords =

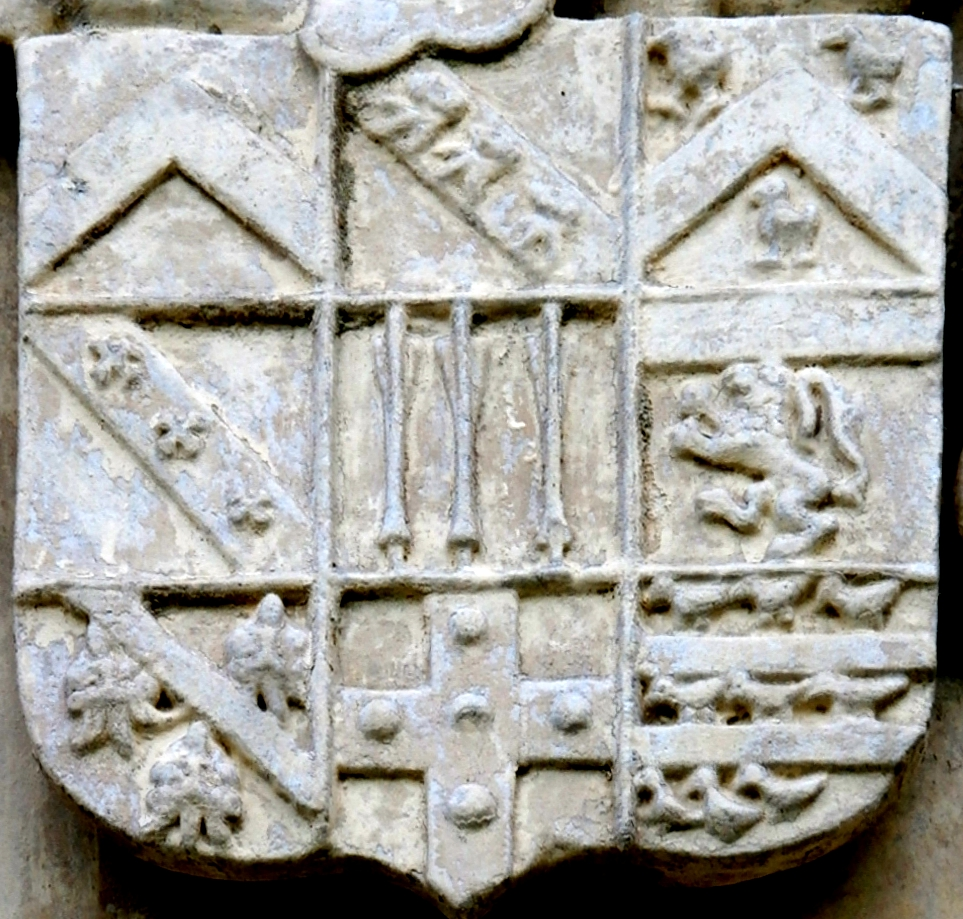
- One of several relics from the filming location
- Starring: Francis Fulford
- Country of origin: United Kingdom
- No. of episodes: 1

Production
- Running time: 30 minutes

Original release
- Network: Channel 4
- Release: August 2004

The F***ing Fulfords is a 2004 documentary-style reality television programme. It was shown in August 2004 and made the name of Francis Fulford and his family when it was aired as part of the United Kingdom's Channel 4 TV series Cutting Edge.

== Background and location ==
Francis, known to his friends as "F**ker" Fulford, is the 24th in his family to have inherited Great Fulford, an 800-year old crumbling manor house on a 3,000-acre (12 km^{2}) estate in Dunsford, near Cheriton Bishop, Devon.

== Synopsis ==
With their mansion becoming increasingly dilapidated and the family in financial difficulty, Francis Fulford concocts several elaborate schemes to make money. The schemes include using a metal detector to search the family's 3000-acre estate for treasure, searching for telephone cables so that he can invoice British Telecom, selling guided tours of the mansion, conjuring up stories of ghosts, and harvesting trees. Meanwhile, his wife Kishanda tries to solve the family's financial difficulties by gambling on horse races.

Oblivious to the family's turmoil, the four Fulford children entertain themselves by fighting, indoor cricket, throwing mud at one another, and watching television. At one point in the episode, Kishanda becomes so angry with her children that she picks up the television set, carries it outside, and throws it into a lake.

Throughout the programme, Francis expresses frequent outbursts of profanity, uttering 38 of the show's 53 swearwords.

== Reception ==
The show was a hit with both viewers and critics. Upon airing on Channel 4, 3.5 million viewers tuned in giving Channel Four a 17% audience share.

The programme was nominated for a BAFTA, in the 'Best Single Documentary' category, in the 2005 awards year. It also featured in Channel Five's '100 most swearing TV shows' and came 7th with 24 swear words – mostly beginning with F – in the first 26 minutes. It was largely this issue – how the use of profane language divided individual strata within the British class system – that marked it out from any other programme or documentary in a similar vein.

== Follow-up programmes ==
In a later programme entitled Why Britain's F****, he raised further points about the decline of a sense of duty, a lack of responsibility and basic knowledge of the United Kingdom's history.

Francis and the four Fulford children returned to television, without the presence of their wife and mother Kishanda, in the six-part series Life Is Toff, broadcast on BBC Three in autumn 2014.
