= Listed buildings in Fulford, Staffordshire =

Fulford is a civil parish in the Borough of Stafford, Staffordshire, England. It contains nine listed buildings that are recorded in the National Heritage List for England. All the listed buildings are designated at Grade II, the lowest of the three grades, which is applied to "buildings of national importance and special interest". The parish contains the villages of Fulford and Stallington and the surrounding area. The listed buildings consist of houses, farmhouses, a former country house and stables, a former windmill, and a church.

== Buildings ==
Name and location	Photograph	Date	Notes
Grindley Cottage, Blythe Bridge; 52.96736°N 2.07431°W	—	Late 16th century (probable)	The house, which was altered later, is in plastered brick, and has a tile roof with coped gables. There are two storeys and an attic, and three bays. The windows are mullioned and contain casements.
Old House Farmhouse; 52.93900°N 2.07239°W	—	17th century	The farmhouse is timber framed with rendered brick infill and a tile roof. There are two storeys, the upper storey jettied on a plain bressumer, and three bays. The doorway has a plain surround, and the windows are casements.
Stallington Hall Farmhouse; 52.95327°N 2.08054°W	—	17th century	The farmhouse, which was altered later, has two storeys, a tile roof, and an L-shaped plan. The rear wing is the earlier, and is timber framed with brick infill. The front range was added in the late 18th century. It is roughcast and contains a modern doorway and modern casement windows.
Fulford Hall; 52.94245°N 2.07137°W	—	18th century	A red brick house on a stone plinth, with a stone string course, and a tile roof with coped gables on the north side. There are two storeys and an attic, and two parallel ranges with a continuous south front. Semicircular steps lead up to the doorway that has a plain surround and a fanlight, and the windows are a mix of casements and sashes, some with projecting keyblocks.
Garden House, Fulford Hall; 52.94235°N 2.07230°W	—	18th century	The garden house to the west of the hall is in red brick on a stone plinth with stone dressings, and a square plan. It has coved stone eaves, and a tiled pyramidal roof.
Rocklands, Townend; 52.93835°N 2.07114°W	—	Late 18th century	A farmhouse, later a private house, it is in red brick with dentilled eaves and a tile roof. There are two storeys, three bays, and a later rear wing. The doorway has a pointed arched head and a moulded surround, and the windows are casements with cambered heads.
Stallington Hall Hospital and stables 52.95042°N 2.08138°W		Late 18th century	A country house, later remodelled and extended and used as a hospital, it is in red brick with stone dressings, quoins, and hipped slate roofs. The building is in two and three storeys with a basement, and has an irregular plan. On the front is a square tower, and projecting from it is a single-storey entrance feature in stone, that has a round-headed doorway with a keystone and a balustrade. The windows are sashes, and there is a full-height canted bay window. Attached to the rear is the former stable block, which has a central pavilion with a pyramidal roof.
Windmill, Meir Heath; 52.95785°N 2.10611°W		Late 18th century	The former windmill is a brick circular tapering tower with three storeys. It contains doorways in the lower two storeys, and circular window openings, now blocked.
St Nicholas' Church; 52.94281°N 2.07220°W		1853	The church is in red brick with stone dressings, and is in Gothic style. It consists of a nave, a south porch, a short chancel, and a west tower. The tower has an embattled parapet, the windows in the nave have pointed heads, and the east window has three lights.
