= Fulford, Staffordshire =

Village in Staffordshire, England

Fulford
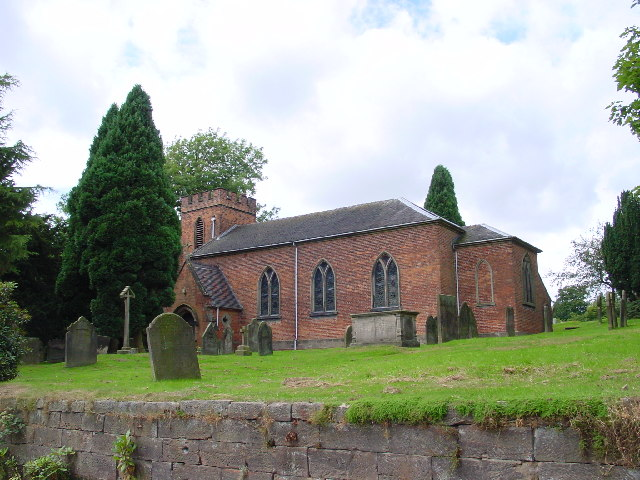
- St Nicholas Church

- Location within Staffordshire
- Area: 0.3025 km^{2} (0.1168 sq mi)
- Population: 650 (2011 census)
  - Density: 2,149/km^{2} (5,570/sq mi)
- Civil parish: Fulford
- District: Stafford
- Shire county: Staffordshire
- Region: West Midlands
- Country: England
- Sovereign state: United Kingdom
- Post town: Stoke-on-Trent
- Postcode district: ST11
- Dialling code: 01782
- Police: Staffordshire
- Fire: Staffordshire
- Ambulance: West Midlands
- Website: https://www.fulfordvillage.com/

Marriages Confirmation (Fulford Chapel) Act 1873
- Act of Parliament
- Parliament of the United Kingdom
- Long title: An Act for legalizing Marriages solemnized in Fulford Chapel, in the Parish of Stone, Staffordshire.
- Citation: 36 & 37 Vict. c. 20
- Territorial extent: United Kingdom

Dates
- Royal assent: 26 May 1873
- Commencement: 26 May 1873 (Note: The Acts of Parliament (Commencement) Act 1793.)
- Repealed: 16 June 1977
Other legislation
| Repealed by | Statute Law (Repeals) Act 1977 |

Status: Repealed

Text of statute as originally enacted

Fulford is a village and civil parish about 5 miles (8 km) north east of Stone, in the Stafford district, in the county of Staffordshire, England. The parish includes the settlements of Crossgate, Leadendale, Meir Heath, Mossgate, Rough Close, Saverley Green, Stallington, Townend and part of Blythe Bridge. In 2011 the built-up area had a population of 650 and the parish had 5,931. The village is on one of the tributaries of the River Blythe. Fulford became a conservation area in 1978. The parish is one of the largest in the Stafford district. The parish touches Forsbrook, Hilderstone, Stone Rural, Barlaston and Draycott in the Moors. Fulford is the highest point in the Stafford district and varies between 650 feet (198 m) and 730 feet (223 m) above sea level.

== Features ==
Fulford has a church dedicated to St Nicholas, which is Grade II listed and was built in the Gothic style in 1825 by C. H. Winks, a primary school and village hall on Fulford Road and a pub called the Shoulder of Mutton, on Meadow Lane. There are 9 listed buildings in Fulford, all Grade II listed.

== History ==
The name "Fulford" means "the dirty ford". Fulford was recorded in the Domesday Book as Fuleford. The village is one of the possible sources of the surname Fulford.

== Civil parish ==
Fulford
- Civil parish
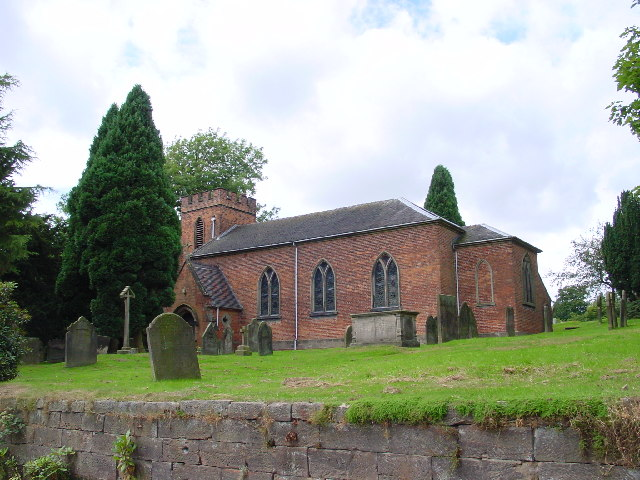
- St Nicholas Church
- Interactive map of Fulford
- Coordinates: 52.939897°N 2.0717819°W
- Country: England
- Primary council: Stafford
- County: Staffordshire
- Region: West Midlands
- Status: Parish
- Settlements: Fulford, Crossgate, Leadendale, Meir Heath, Mossgate, Rough Close, Saverley Green, Stallington, Townend and part of Blythe Bridge

Area
  - Total: 14.9 km^{2} (5.8 sq mi)

Population (2011)
  - Total: 5,931
  - Density: 398/km^{2} (1,030/sq mi)
- Website: http://www.fulford-parish-council.org/

Formerly a township and chapelry, Fulford became a civil parish on 1 April 1897. The parish was created from part of Stone Rural parish, which itself had been split from Stone parish in 1894.
