= Kishanda =

Ward in Valley in Rumanyika-Karagwe National Park, Tanzania

Coordinates: 1.251794°S 30.796073°E

Kishanda is a valley and national reserve for elephants in Tanzania. The reserve is part of the Rumanyika-Karagwe National Park created in 2019 and located in Kagera Region west of Lake Victoria.
