= Francis Fulford (landowner) =

British reality TV personality (born 1952)

- Full name: Francis Fulford
- Born: 31 August 1952 (age 74); Great Fulford, Exeter, Devon, England
- Residence: Great Fulford
- Spouse: Diana Kishanda Tulloch (m. 1992)
- Issue: 4

Francis Fulford (born 31 August 1952) is a British businessman, television personality, presenter, and former stockbroker. He belongs to the landed gentry and is the 26th Fulford to have owned and inhabited Great Fulford manor house in Devon.

== Life and career ==
Francis Fulford is the son of Lieutenant-Colonel Francis Edgar Anthony Fulford and Joan Shirley, younger daughter of Rear-Admiral C. Maurice Blackman, DSO. He is a great-great-grandson of Francis Fulford (1803–1868), Bishop of Montreal.

Fulford attended Sunningdale School in Berkshire, but failed the common entrance exam for Eton, so instead attended Milton Abbey School in Dorset. After leaving there, he did not go on to any higher education. At 18, he attempted a career with the Coldstream Guards, but failed the Army Officer Selection Board exam. He travelled to Australia to work as a jackaroo, but soon returned to Britain, re-taking (and again failing) the Army Officer Selection Board exam, before moving to London to work as a stockbroker and insurance broker. Since inheriting the family estate, he has devoted himself to its management, though, it is in need of restoration and currently (according to his many television appearances) in a state of severe debt. He lives there with his wife Kishanda and four children.

Since 2004, he has maintained an ongoing career in reality television, appearing in various entertainment and documentary-style programmes, many of which (such as The F***ing Fulfords) make a feature of his casual swearing, prejudices, and traditionalist views.

In 2007, he attempted a move into local politics, standing for a seat on Teignbridge District Council as a member of the Conservative Party. He was defeated, gaining 370 votes out of an electorate of 2,215. In all previous local elections, the Conservative Party candidate(s) had been elected easily. As of 2020, the Teign Valley was represented by two Conservative Party councillors on the Teignbridge District Council.

In 2009, he appeared on 60 Minutes Australia where he expressed his desire to shoot what he deems "champagne socialists", amongst other comments expressing his gratification of his ancestor having killed 5,000 Frenchmen. He subsequently makes the remark "55 million left".

As of 2014, Fulford was a member of the UK Independence Party.

== Family estate ==
Fulford is lord of the manor of Great Fulford, the current owner of the estate which was granted to his ancestor William de Fulford by King Richard about 1191, as a reward for military service on the Third Crusade. The present great house dates back to the 16th century.

== Reality television ==
- The F***ing Fulfords (2004)
- How Clean Is Your House? (2004)
- Why America Sucks (2005)
- Why England's F***ed (2005)
- Country House Rescue (2012)
- Salvage Hunters (2012)
- Life Is Toff (6 episodes) (2014)
- Help! My House Is Haunted (2018)
- Handcuffed: Last Pair Standing (2026)

== Publications ==
- Bearing Up: The Long View, Timewell Press, London 2004, ISBN 1-85725-203-9

== Ancestry ==
Ancestors of Francis Fulford (b. 1952)

16. Francis Fulford (1803–1868); Bishop of Montreal
8. Francis Drummond Fulford (1831–1907)
17. Mary Drummond (1812–1873); great-granddaughter of William Drummond, 4th Viscount Strathallan
4. Francis Algernon Fulford (1861–1926)
18. Charles Holland
9. Mary Ann Holland (1835–1894)
19. Elisabeth Prior
2. Lt.-Col. Francis Edgar Anthony Fulford (1898–1969)
20. Andrew Robert Drummond (1794–1865), great-grandson of William Drummond, 4th Viscount Strathallan
10. Edgar Atheling Drummond (1825–1893)
21. Lady Elizabeth Frederica Manners (1801–1886), daughter of John Manners, 5th Duke of Rutland
5. Constance Louisa Drummond (1870–1935)
22. Lowther Augustus John Pennington (1802–1838), 3rd Baron Muncaster
11. Hon. Louisa Theodosia Pennington (1838–1886)
23. Frances Catherine Ramsden (1805–1853)
1. Francis Fulford
24. Charles Thomas Blackman (1820–1888)
12. Charles William Blackman (1857–1907)
25. Sarah Wood (1831–1912)
6. Rear-Admiral Charles Maurice Blackman (1890–1981)
26. John Leggett Budden (1817–1860)
13. Gertrude Frances Budden (1857–1939)
27. Frances Charlotte James
3. Joan Shirley Blackman (d. 2012)
28. John Hargrave
14. Lawrence Hargrave
29. Ann Hargrave
7. Brenda Olive Hargrave (1893–1969)
15. Margaret Preston Johnson
