= Great Fulford =

Historic estate in Devon, England

Coordinates: 50°42′44″N 3°42′53″W

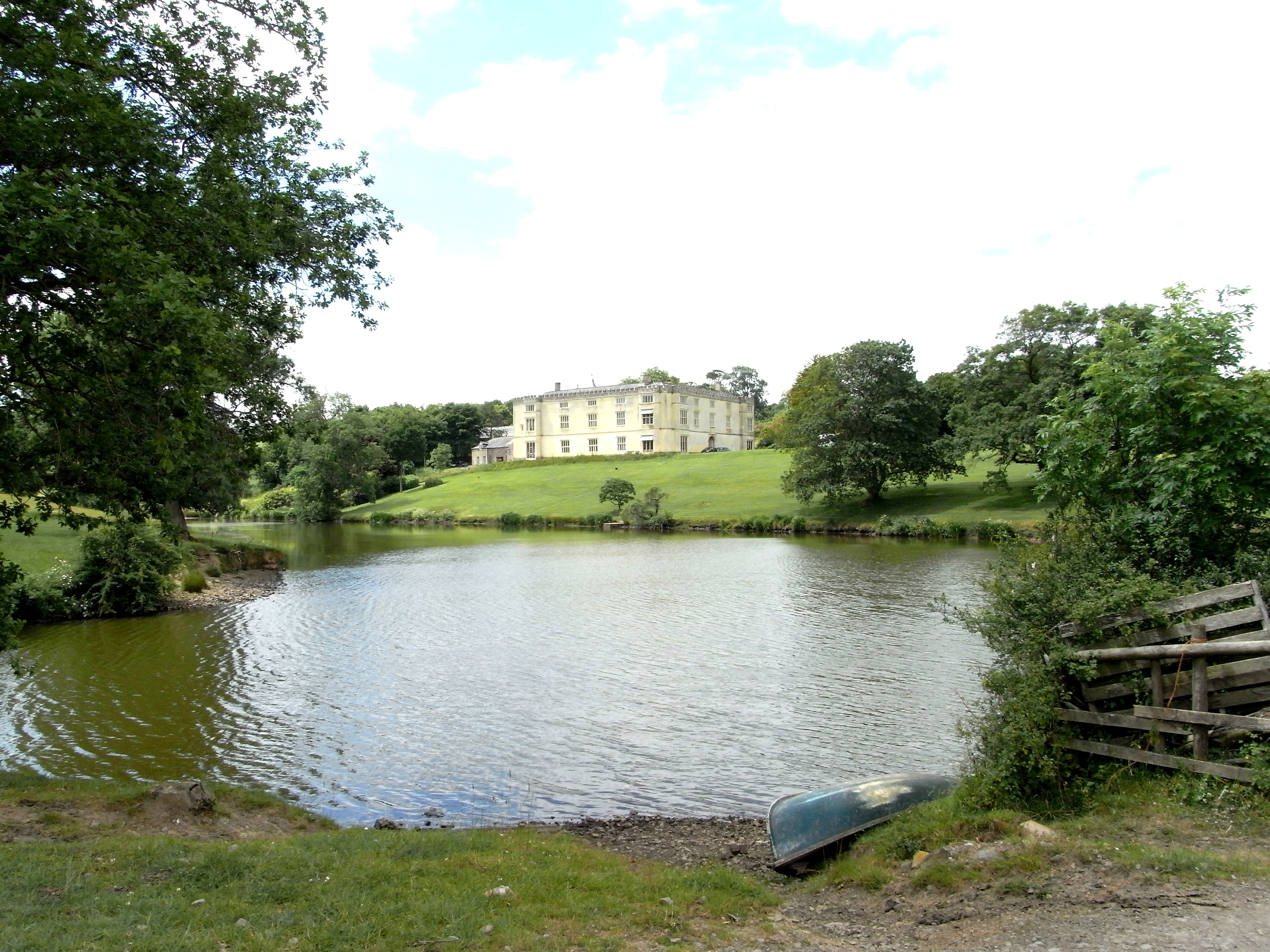
Great Fulford House in 2015, view from south-east

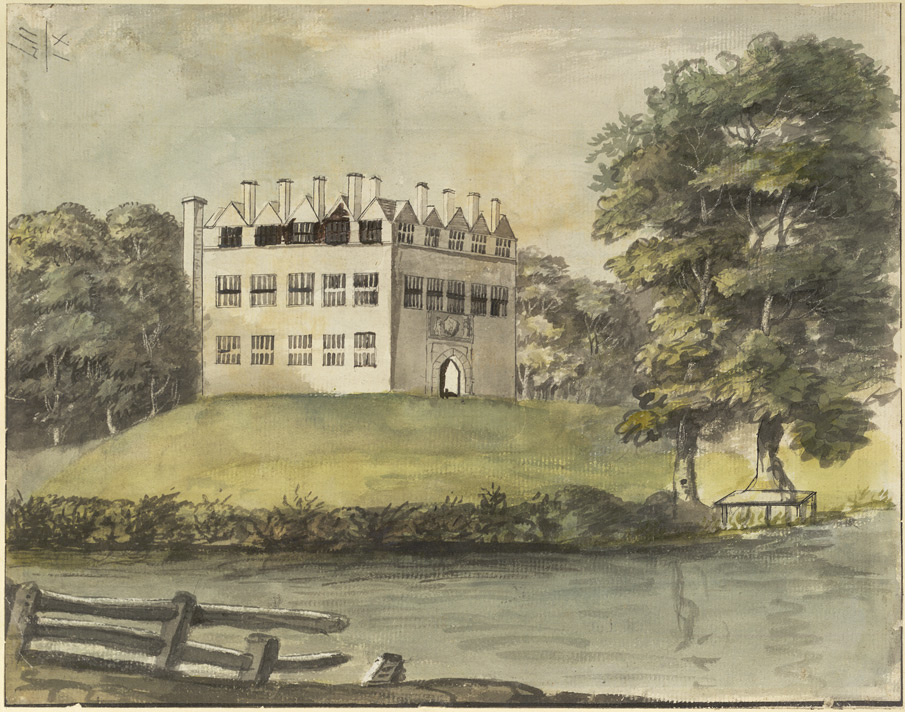
Great Fulford House, view from south-east. 1780 watercolour, British Library. The later remodelling by James Wyatt in 1805 replaced the gables with battlements and added full height bay windows at the corners

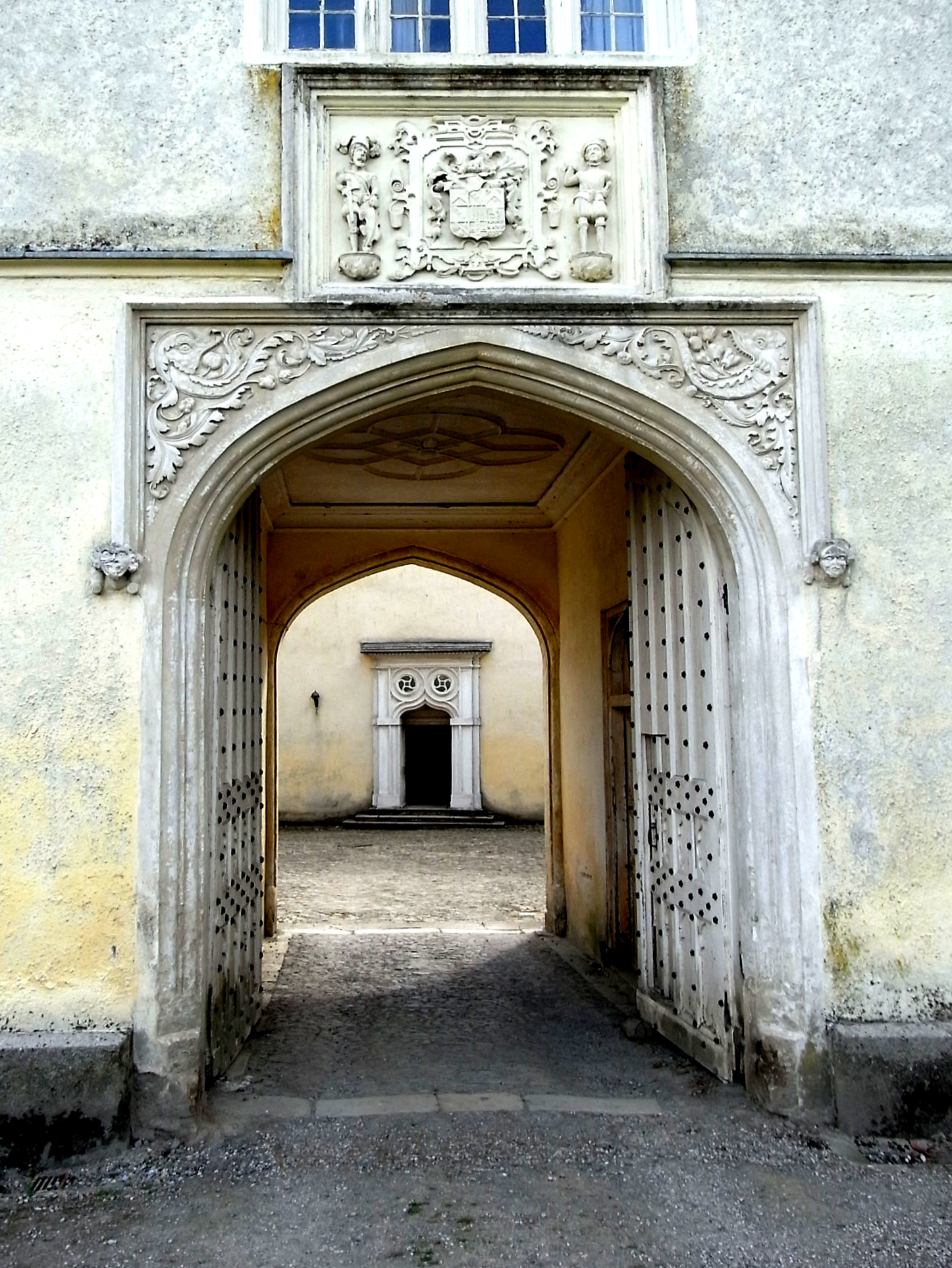
Tudor main entrance to courtyard pierced through east front, Great Fulford House. Beyond is the front door leading to the great hall in the west wing. Above is an Elizabethan (16th century) relief sculpted panel showing the arms of Fulford of nine quarters within a strapwork surround with supporters two Saracens

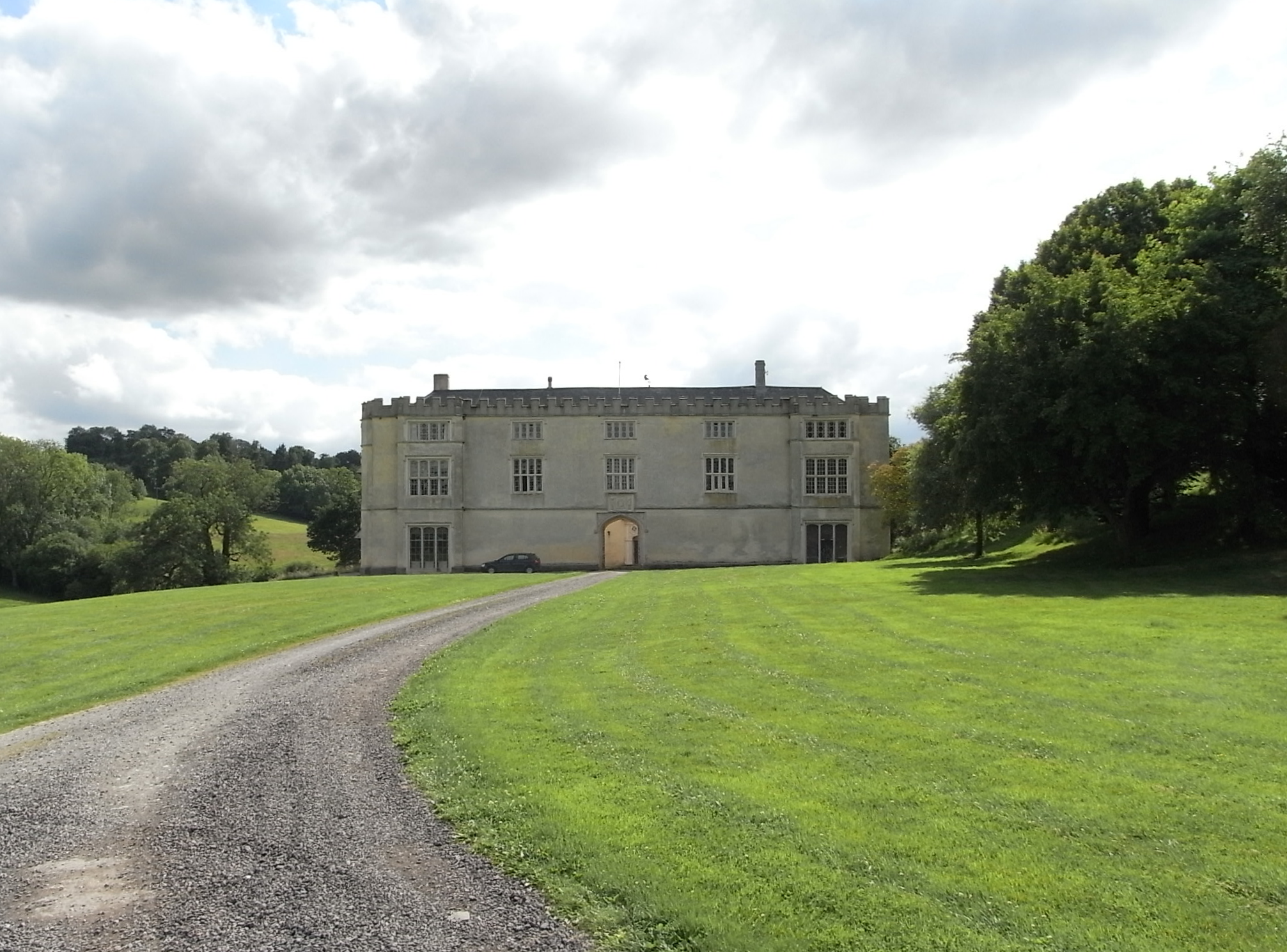
Great Fulford House, east front

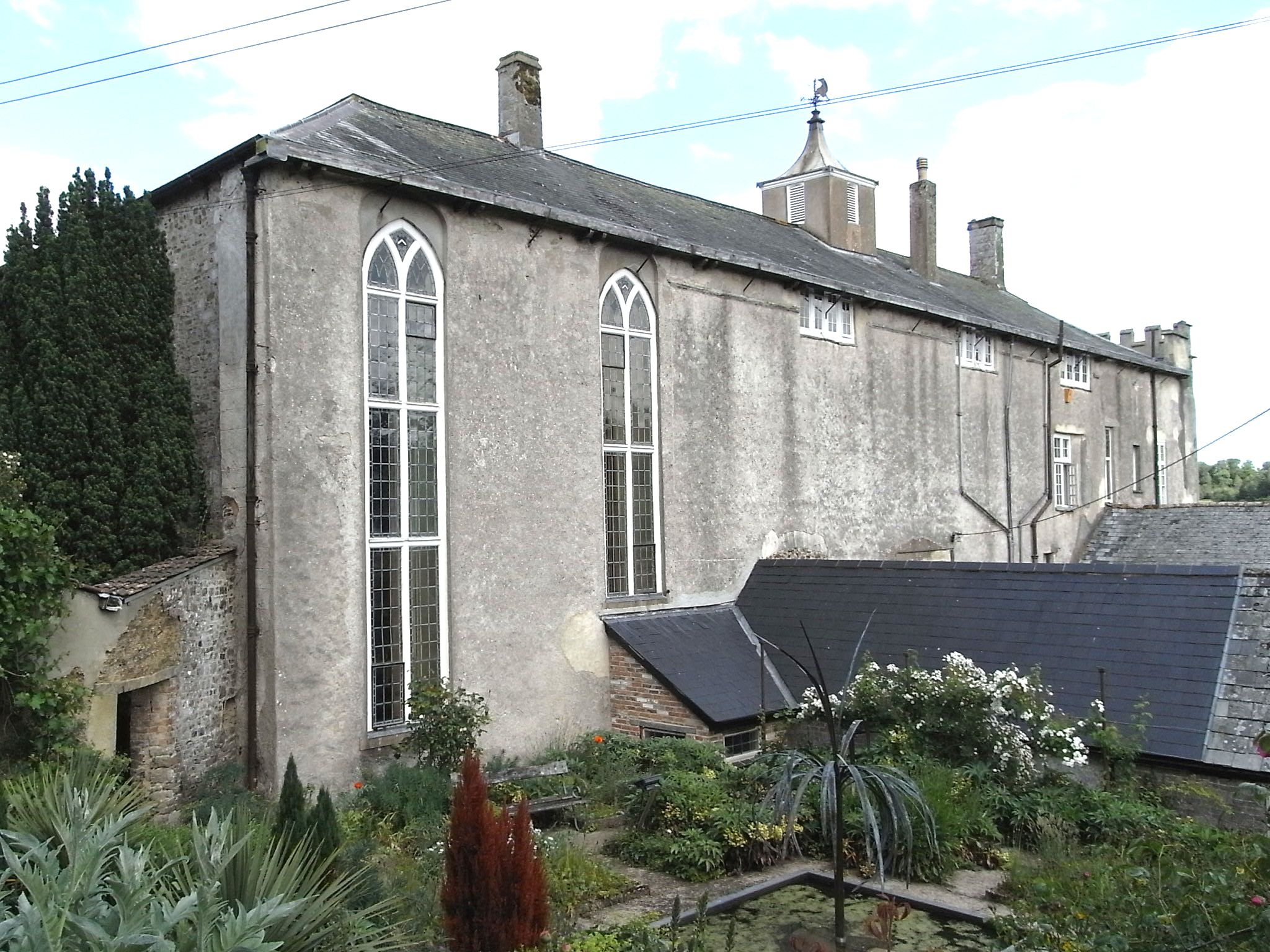
Great Fulford House, west front. The full height lancet windows at left light the Grand Staircase; the blind central section houses the full height Great Hall

Great Fulford is an historic estate in the parish of Dunsford, Devon. The grade I listed manor house, known as Great Fulford House, is about 9 miles west of Exeter. Its site was said in 1810 to be "probably the most ancient in the county". The present mansion house is Tudor (16th century) with refurbishment from the late 17th century and further remodelling from about 1800. The prefix "Great" dates from the late 17th century and served to distinguish it from the mansion house known as "Little Fulford" in the parish of Shobrooke, Devon, about 8 miles to the north-east, also owned briefly by Col. Francis Fulford (1666–1700), as a result of his marriage to the heiress of the Tuckfield family. Great Fulford has been the residence of the Fulford family (originally "de Fulford"), which took its name from the estate, from the reign of King Richard I (1189–1199) to the present day. In 2004, the estate comprised 3,000 acres (1,200 ha).

== Descent ==
The descent of the estate was as follows:

=== Honour of Okehampton ===
In the Domesday Book of 1086, Foleford is listed as the 132nd of the 176 holdings of Baldwin FitzGilbert (died 1090), Sheriff of Devon (alias Baldwin the Sheriff, Baldwin of Exeter, Baldwin de Meulles/Moels and Baldwin du Sap), an Anglo-Norman magnate and one of the 52 Devon Domesday Book tenants-in-chief of King William the Conqueror. He was the first feudal baron of Okehampton, which barony, known as the Honour of Okehampton, was later inherited by the Courtenay family, later Earls of Devon.

=== Modbert ===
Baldwin FitzGilbert's tenant in 1086 was Modbert, who also held from him the Devonshire manors of Kelly, Broadwood Kelly, Eggbeer and Uppacott.

=== Kelly ===
Modbert's heirs in all these five manors appear to have been the de Kelly family.

=== Fulford ===
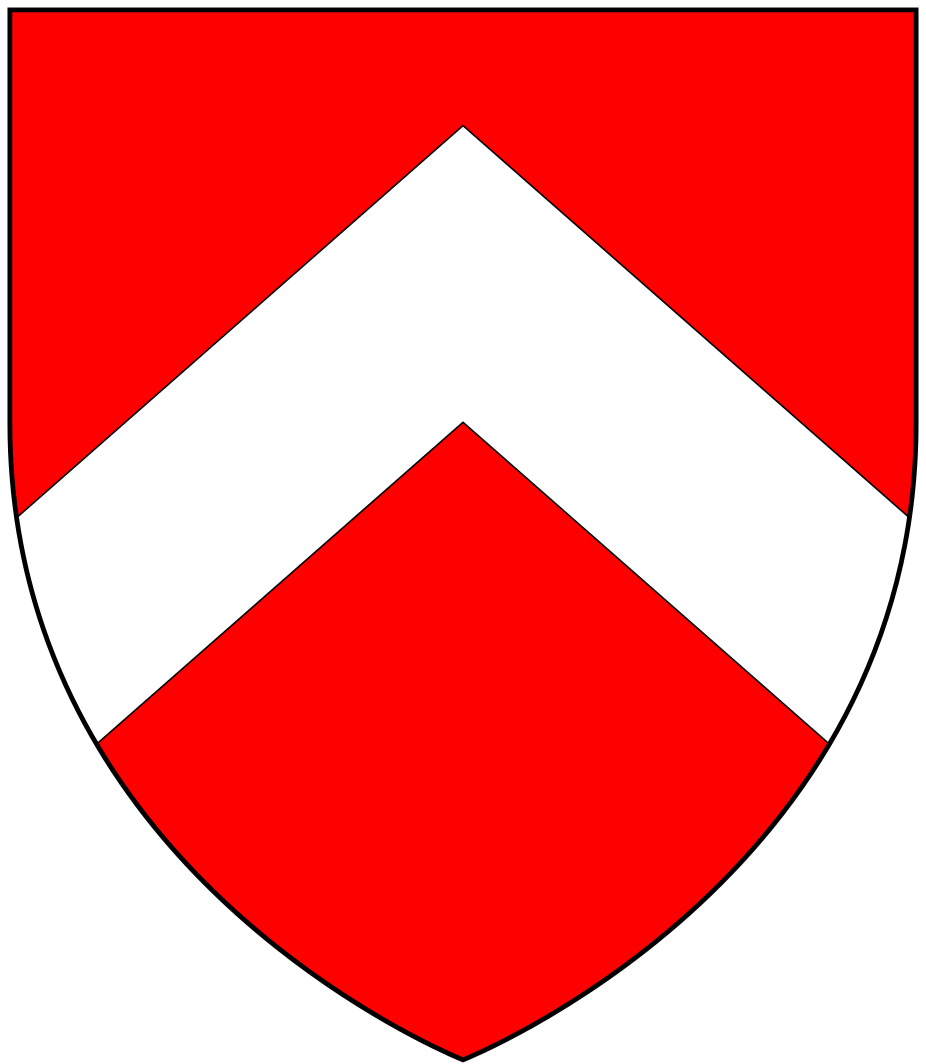
Arms of Fulford: Gules, a chevron argent

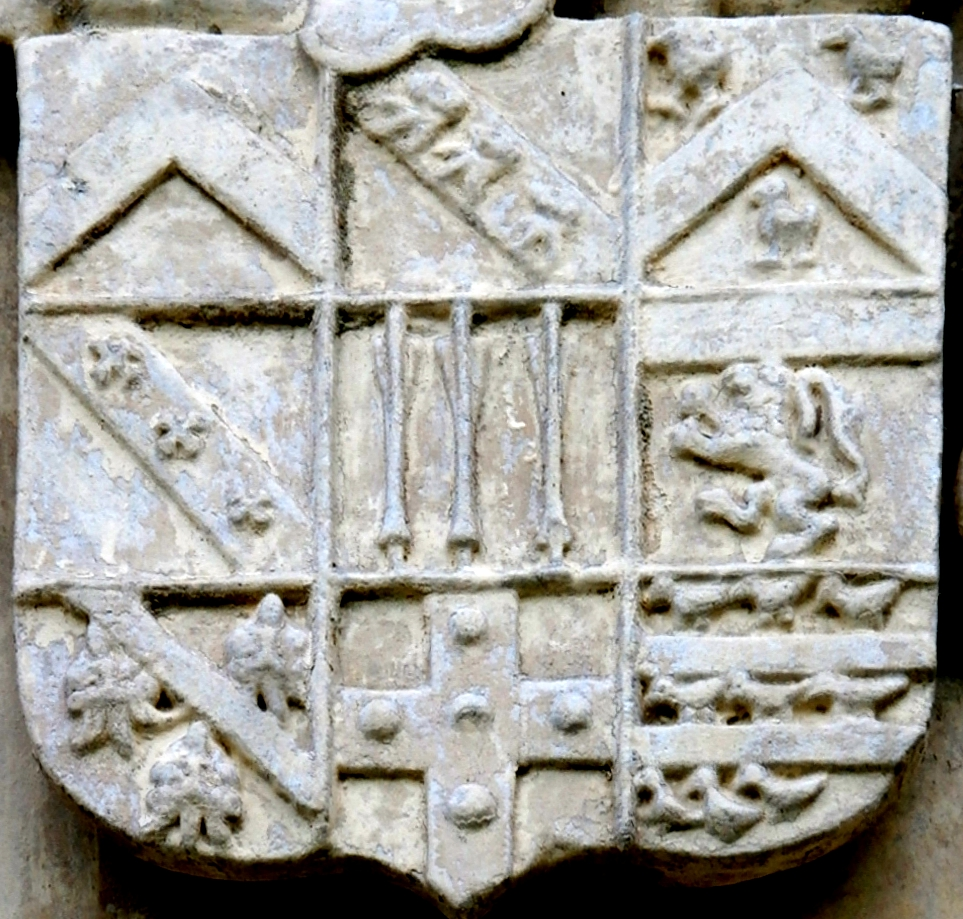
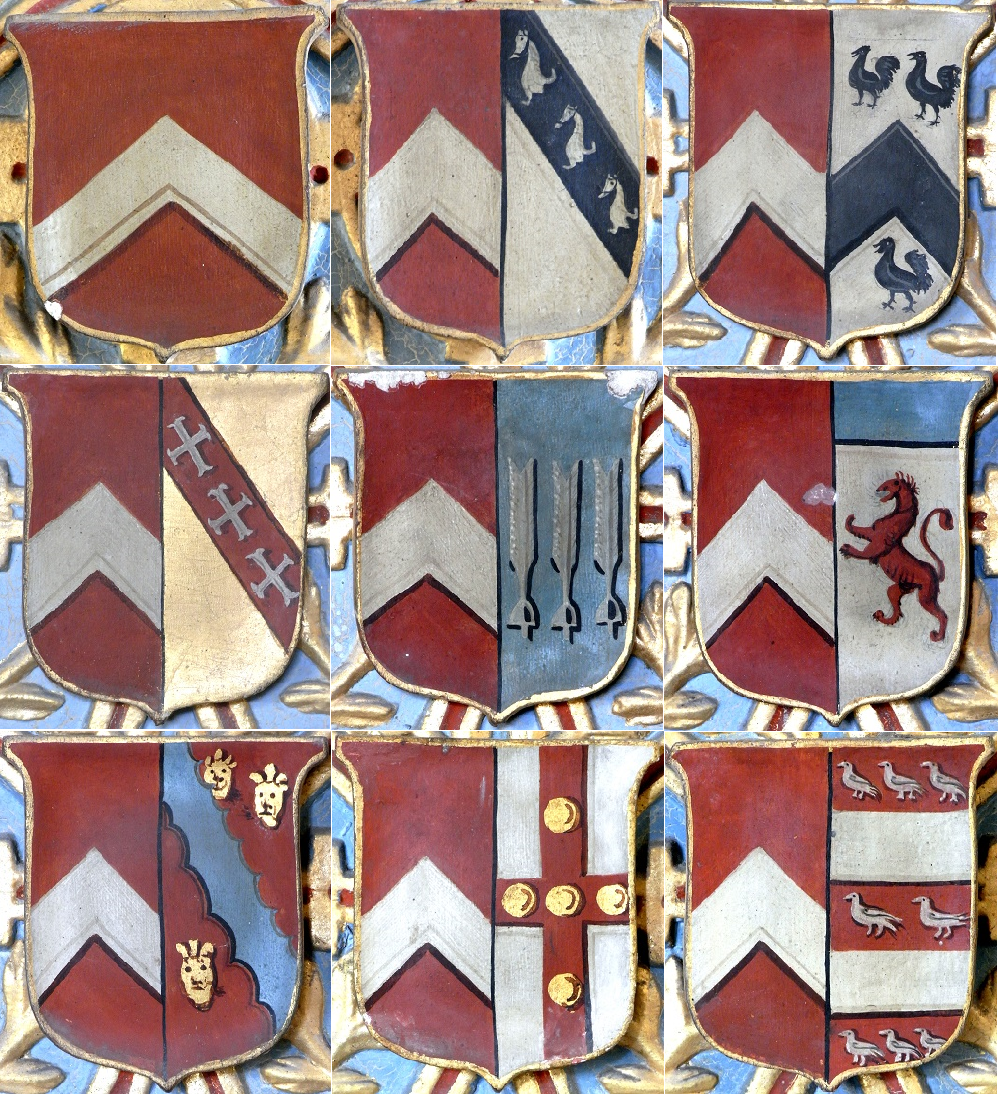
Left: 16th century relief-sculpted stone escutcheon of 9 quarters over main entrance to courtyard of Great Fulford House; right same arms depicted on the monument to Sir Thomas Fulford (died 1610) in the Fulford Chapel of Dunsford Church:
- 1: Gules, a chevron argent (Fulford)
- 2: Argent, on a bend sable three bear's heads and necks erased of the first (FitzUrse)
- 3: Argent, a chevron between three moorcocks sable (Moreton)
- 4: Or, on a bend gules three crosses formée argent (Belston)
- 5: Azure, three bird-bolts palewise points in base argent (Bozom of Bozom's Hele)
- 6: Argent, a lion rampant gules a chief azure (St George (of Dittisham?), an heiress of Bozom; also arms of St George Baronets)
- 7: Gules, three leopard's faces or jessant-de-lys azure over all a bend engrailed azure (Denys of Glamorgan and of Siston, Gloucestershire, an heiress of Bonville)
- 8: Ermine, on a cross gules five bezants (St Aubyn of Combe Raleigh, an heiress of Denys)
- 9: Gules, two bars between nine martlets argent 3, 3, 3 (Challons (of Legh Challons?), an heiress of St Aubyn)

==== Pre-15th century Fulfords ====
The de Fulford family is first recorded as resident at Fulford during the reign of King Richard I (1189–1199). According to Rev. John Prince (died 1723), the name of this family was Latinized to de Turpi Vado ("from the foul ford" (i.e.muddy ford)). Records of Feudal Aids record John de Kelli had as his tenant of Fulford a certain William de Foleford. The descent of Fulford was as follows:

- Edmond Fulford
- John Fulford (son), who married Alicia FitzUrse, daughter and co-heiress of Ralph FitzUrse of Williton in Somerset, son and heir of Sir Reginald FitzUrse. The canting arms of FitzUrse showed bears (Latin: ursus, French: ours), (Argent, on a bend sable three bear's heads and necks erased of the first) which theme is maintained in the Fulford crest A bear's head erased sable muzzled or and motto "Bear Up", which inspired the title of Francis Fulford's 2004 book Bearing Up. Sir Reginald FitzUrse (1145–1173) was one of the four knights who murdered Thomas Becket in 1170. His name is derived from Fitz, a contracted form of the Norman-French fils de, meaning "son of" and "Urse" from the Latin ursus, meaning a bear (French: ours), probable nom de guerre of his ancestor. Although he lived before the true age of heraldry which developed in the early 13th century, his shield bore the cognizance of a bear, which is visible in a contemporary drawing portraying the murder of Becket.
- Henry de Fulford (son)
- William de Fulford (son)
- William de Fulford (son). Either the first or second William married Mariot Belston, one of the three daughters and co-heiresses of Sir Baldwin de Belston of Belstone, situated 10 miles west of Fulford. The Fulfords inherited a one third moiety of the manor of Belstone and several generations later Col. Sir Francis Fulford (c. 1583 – 1664) was stated by his contemporary Sir William Pole (died 1635), to be patron of Belstone Church. The arms of de Belston (Or, on a bend gules three crosses formée argent) appear as the 4th quartering on the 16th century escutcheon above the entrance to Great Fulford House.
- Thomas de Fulford (son), who married the daughter and heiress of "Mourton". The arms Argent, a chevron between three moorcocks sable appear as the 3rd quartering on the 16th century escutcheon above the entrance to Great Fulford House, which according to Pole (died 1635) are the arms of "Moore of Moore", possibly Moore, near Tavistock. These arms with tinctures also appear in the Fulford Chapel of Dunsford Church, namely in the 19th century heraldic window and (as a painted restoration) on the monument to Sir Thomas Fulford (died 1610).
- John de Fulford (son)
- Henry de Fulford (son), who married Willmot Brian, daughter and heiress of Phillip Brian.

==== Sir Baldwin de Fulford (died 1461/1476) ====
Sir Baldwin de Fulford (died 1476) (son), Sheriff of Devon in 1460, a Knight of the Sepulchre and Under-Admiral to John Holland, 2nd Duke of Exeter (died 1447), High Admiral of England. According to the Devonshire biographer John Prince (1643–1723):

He was a great soldier and a traveller of so undaunted resolution that for the honor and liberty of a royal lady in a castle besieged by the infidels, he fought a combat with a Sarazen, for bulk and bigness an unequal match (as the representation of him cut in the wainscot in Fulford House doth plainly shew), whom yet he vanquish'd, and rescu'd the lady.

In commemoration of this victory supporters to the arms of the family were granted (generally reserved as a privilege of the nobility alone) of two Saracens, which they still retain, and which survive today sculpted in relief on the 16th century wooden panelling of the Great Hall of Great Fulford House, as Prince noted. The carved wooden figure of a Saracen tops the newel post at the base of the Great Staircase.

He may be the same Sir Baldwin Fulford who as is recorded by Stow (d.1605) was executed in Bristol Castle in 1461, in fulfilment of his bond to King Edward IV that he would either kill the Earl of Warwick, who was then plotting to dethrone the reigning sovereign, or lose his own head.

He married Elizabeth (or Jennet) Bosome, daughter and heiress of John Bosome (alias Bosom, Bozun, Bosum, etc.) of Bosom's Hele (alias Bozunsele, etc., modern: "Bozomzeal"), in the parish of Dittisham, near Dartmouth, Devon, by his wife Johane Fortescue. Elizabeth Bozom survived her husband and married secondly to Sir William Huddesfield (died 1499), of Shillingford St. George, Devon, Attorney General to King Edward IV (1461–1483). Huddesfield married secondly (as her third husband) to Katherine Courtenay, a daughter of Sir Philip Courtenay (died 1463) of Powderham, Devon. A monumental brass of Huddesfield and his second wife Katherine Courtenay survives in Shillingford St George Church, and the arms of Bosome (Azure, three bird bolts in pale points downward or) survive in a stained glass window in the same church. By Jennet Bosome, heiress of Bozum's Hele, he had children two sons and two daughters, namely Thomasine Fulford, who married John Wise of Sydenham House, from whom was descended John Russell, 1st Earl of Bedford (c. 1485 – 1555), the most powerful magnate in Devon, and another daughter Alice Fulford, who married Sir William Cary of Cockington, from whom was descended Lord Hunsdon and the Earls of Monmouth and Dover. His younger son was John Fulford (died 1518), a Canon of Exeter Cathedral and Archdeacon successively of Totnes, Cornwall and Exeter, whose large black marble ledger stone survives in Exeter Cathedral, behind the high altar (or in the eastern aisle), inscribed as follows in Gothic letters: Hic jacet magist(er) Joannes Fulford filius Baldwini Fulford milit(i), hui(us) eccle(siae) Resid. pr. Archid. Tottn. deinde Cornub(iae)' ult. Exon, q(ui) obiit xix die Januarii A(nno) D(omini) xv.xviii cui(us) a(n)i(ma)e p(ro)pitietur Deus ("Here lies Master John Fulford, son of Sir Baldwin Fulford, Knight, residentiary of this church, first Archdeacon of Totnes, then of Cornwall, and lastly of Exeter, who died on the ninth day of January in the year of our Lord 1518, on whose soul may God look with favour").

The manor of Bosom's Hele was inherited by the Fulford family and the arms of Bozom appear in the 5th quarter of the 16th century relief sculpted escutcheon over the main entrance to Great Fulford House.

==== Sir Thomas Fulford (died 1489) ====
Sir Thomas Fulford (died 1489) (eldest son and heir), who married his step-father's sister-in-law, Phillipa Courtenay, a daughter of Sir Philip Courtenay (died 1463) of Powderham (by his wife Elizabeth Hungerford, daughter of Walter Hungerford, 1st Baron Hungerford (died 1449), KG), and sister of Katherine Courtenay, second wife of Sir William Huddesfield (died 1499). Vivian (1895) states him to have died on 20 February 1489 with an inquisition post mortem having been held in 1490, but Burke (1838) states him to have been beheaded in 1461 after fighting for the Lancastrians at the Battle of Towton. His second son appears to have been Sir Thomas Fulford who in 1497 was with Edward Courtenay, 1st Earl of Devon (died 1509) at the relief of the City of Exeter following the siege by Perkin Warbeck.

==== Sir Humphrey Fulford (1467–1508) ====
Sir Humphrey Fulford (1467–1508) (eldest son), who married Florence Bonville, a daughter and co-heiress of John Bonville (1417–1494) of Shute, Devon, nephew of the Devon magnate William Bonville, 1st Baron Bonville (1391–1461), the latter who during the Wars of the Roses was an enemy of the Courtenay Earls of Devon and an ally of their cousins the Courtenays of Powderham. The marriage was without children.

==== William Fulford (1476–1517) ====
William Fulford (1476–1517), younger brother, married Jane Bonville, one of the six daughters and co-heiresses of John Bonville (died 1491) of Combe Raleigh, illegitimate son of the Devon magnate William Bonville, 1st Baron Bonville (1391–1461), of Shute, by his mistress, Elizabeth Kirkby. John's wife was Alice Dennis, daughter and sole heiress of William Dennis, by his wife Joan St Aubyn, heiress of Combe Raleigh. Joan was one of two daughters and co-heiresses of Sir John St Aubyn of Combe Raleigh and his wife Catherine Chalons, daughter and heiress of Sir Robert Chalons (died 1445). The arms of Dennis of Glamorgan (not to be confused with the Denys families of Holcombe Burnell and Orleigh in Devon), St Aubyn and Chalons form the last three quarters (7th, 8th & 9th) on the 16th century stone escutcheon over the entrance archway into the courtyard of Great Fulford House.

==== Sir John Fulford (1503–1544) ====
Sir John Fulford (1503–1544) (son), twice Sheriff of Devon in 1534 and 1540. He married Dorothy Bourchier, a daughter of John Bourchier, 1st Earl of Bath (1470–1539), of Tawstock, Devon. She survived him and remarried to Walter Denys of Holcombe Burnell, Devon. His daughter Elizabeth Fulford married Humphrey Arundell (c. 1513 – 1550) of Helland in Cornwall, the leader of Cornish forces in the Prayer Book Rebellion who was executed at Tyburn.

==== Sir John Fulford (1524–1580) ====
Sir John Fulford (1524–1580) (son), twice Sheriff of Devon in 1557 and 1576. He married firstly Anna Denys, a daughter of Sir Thomas Denys (c. 1477 – 1561) of Holcombe Burnell, Devon, six times Sheriff of Devon during the reign of King Henry VIII (1509–1547).

==== Sir Thomas Fulford (1553–1610) ====
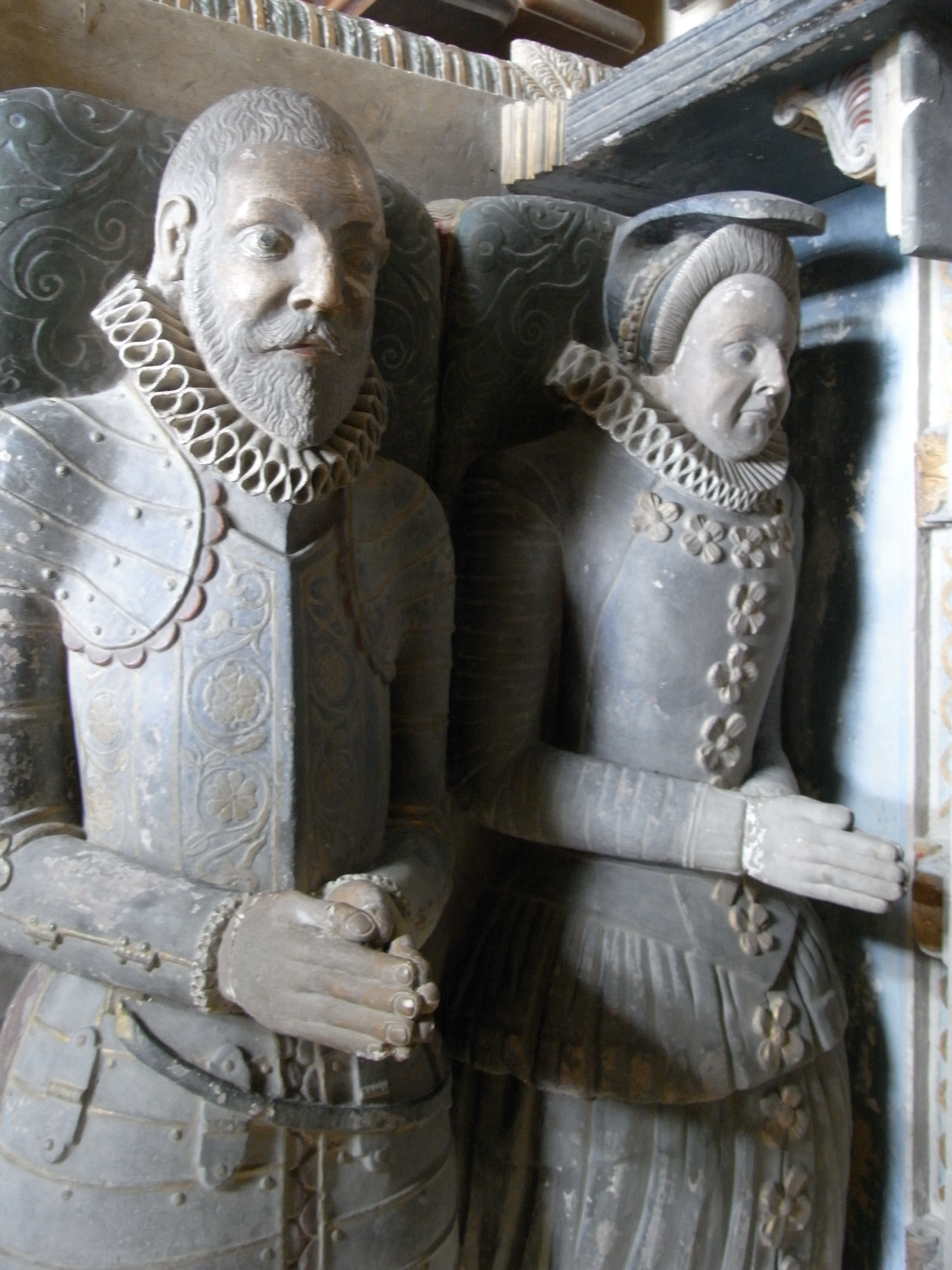
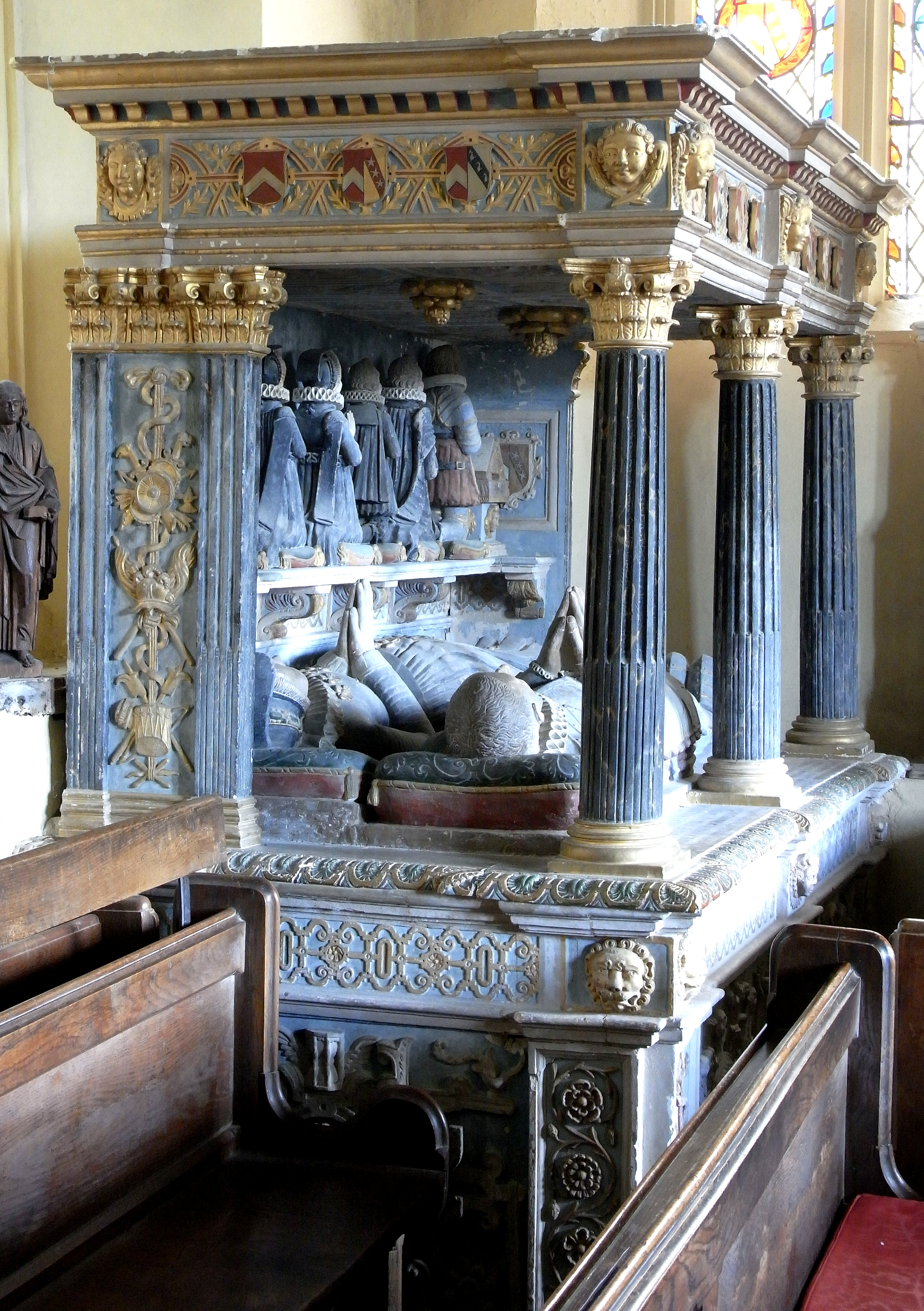
Effigies of Sir Thomas Fulford (1553–1610) and his wife Ursula Bampfield, detail from his monument (right) in the Fulford Chapel of Dunsford Church

Sir Thomas Fulford (1553–1610) (son), who in 1580 married Ursula Bampfield (died 1639), a daughter of Richard Bampfield (1526–1594) of Poltimore, Devon, Sheriff of Devon in 1576, ancestor of the Bampfield Baronets and Barons Poltimore. His monument survives in Dunsford Church, showing recumbent effigies of himself dressed in full armour and his wife with kneeling figures of his children above, 3 sons and 4 daughters, with profuse heraldry on the cornice of Fulford impaling the arms of various wives, including Bampfield: Or, on a bend gules three mullets argent. It is inscribed on two painted wooden panels:

Heare lyethe Sir Thomas Fulforde who died last day of July An^{o} Do. 1610. Also his wife Ursula who died 1639 daughter of Rich^{d} Bampfield of Poltimore Esq^{r}. Their children: 1st Sir Francis who married Ann heir of Bernard Samways Esq^{r} of Toller, Dorset; 2nd William; 3rd Thomas; 4th Bridget, married to Arthur Champernown Esq^{r} of Dartington; 5th Elizabeth married to John Berriman Esq^{r}; 6th Ann married to John Sydenham of Somerset.

The monument was restored in 1845 by Col. Baldwin Fulford. "The original inscription apparently spoke poisonously of the Roman Catholic Church...at the instigation of a Roman Catholic friend, Dr. Oliver, Col. Baldwin Fulford had the monument restored in 1845, so a new inscription was supplied". The name of Mary, the 4th daughter whose effigy appears on the monument, is omitted. She was the 2nd wife of Sir Ferdinando Gorges (1565/8-1647), founder of the Province of Maine, known as the "Father of English Colonization in North America".

==== Col. Sir Francis Fulford (c. 1583 – 1664) ====
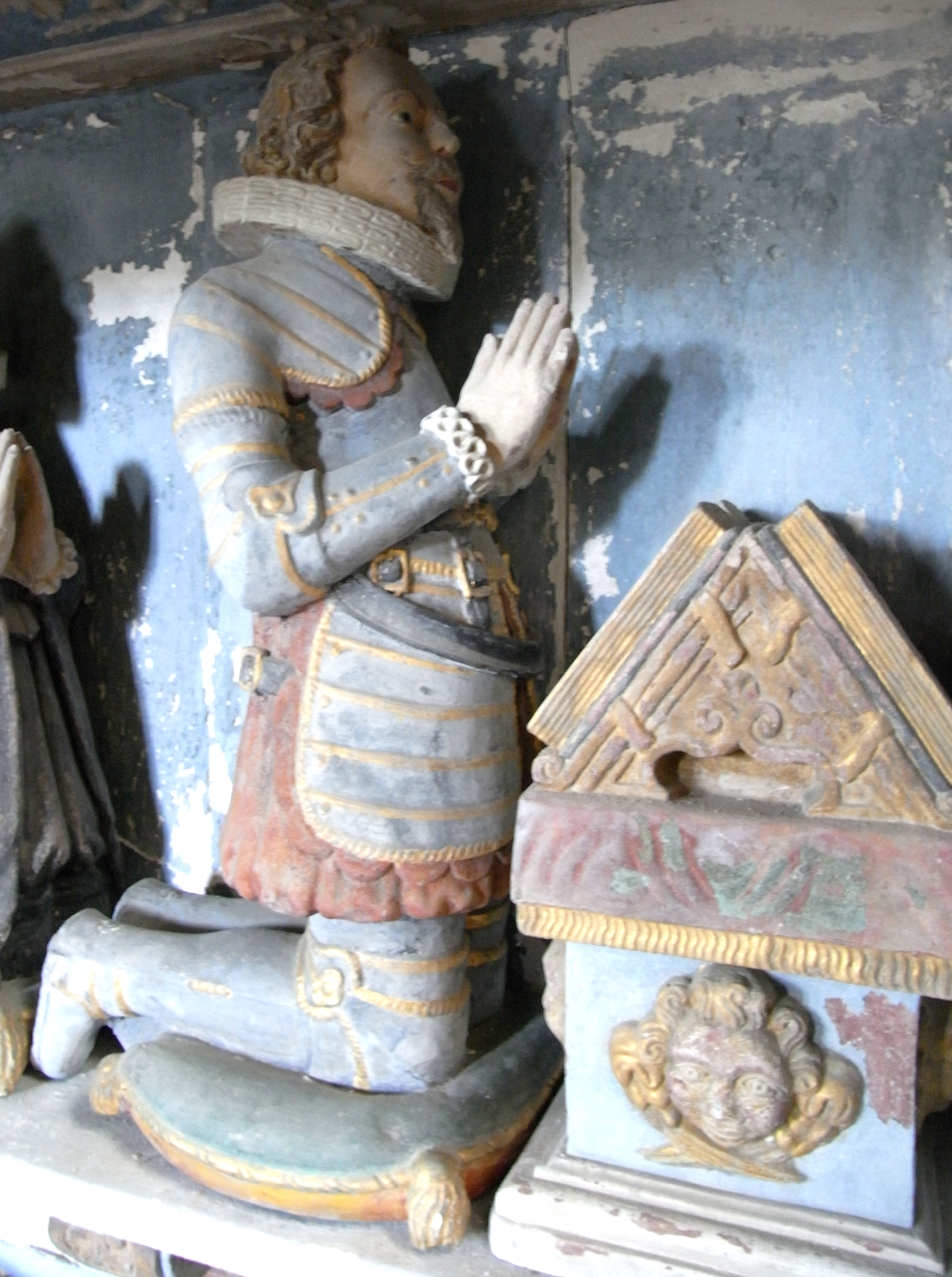
Effigy of Col. Sir Francis Fulford (c. 1583 – 1664); detail from monument to his father, Fulford Chapel of St Mary's Church, Dunsford

Col. Sir Francis Fulford (c. 1583 – 1664) (eldest son), a Royalist commander during the English Civil War, captured and briefly imprisoned in Devon in early 1643. He maintained a garrison at Great Fulford until December 1645, when he surrendered to Thomas Fairfax, 3rd Lord Fairfax of Cameron. He was pre-deceased by eldest son Thomas Fulford (1604–1643), who was killed at the Siege of Exeter in 1643 during the Civil War. He served as member of parliament for Devon in 1625, as a deputy lieutenant of Dorset by 1640 and was Sheriff of Dorset for 1642–43. He was fined during the Commonwealth by the Committee for Compounding with Delinquents, but not heavily enough to destroy the family's fortune. He married Elizabeth Samways, a daughter and co-heiress of Bernard Samways of Toller Fratrum and Winsborne in Dorset. He left his wife's Dorset estates, including Toller Fratrum to his 5th, but 2nd surviving, son George Fulford (1619–1685), twice MP for Christchurch in Dorset, in 1679 and 1681, whose son would eventually inherit Fulford on the failure of the senior male line in 1700.

==== Francis Fulford (1632–1675) ====
Francis Fulford (1632–1675) (grandson, eldest son of Thomas Fulford), who married Susanna Kellond (died 1670), daughter of John Kellond (1609–1679) of Painsford House, Ashprington, Devon, Sheriff of Devon in 1666, whose monument survives in Ashprington Church.

==== Col. Francis Fulford (1666–1700) ====
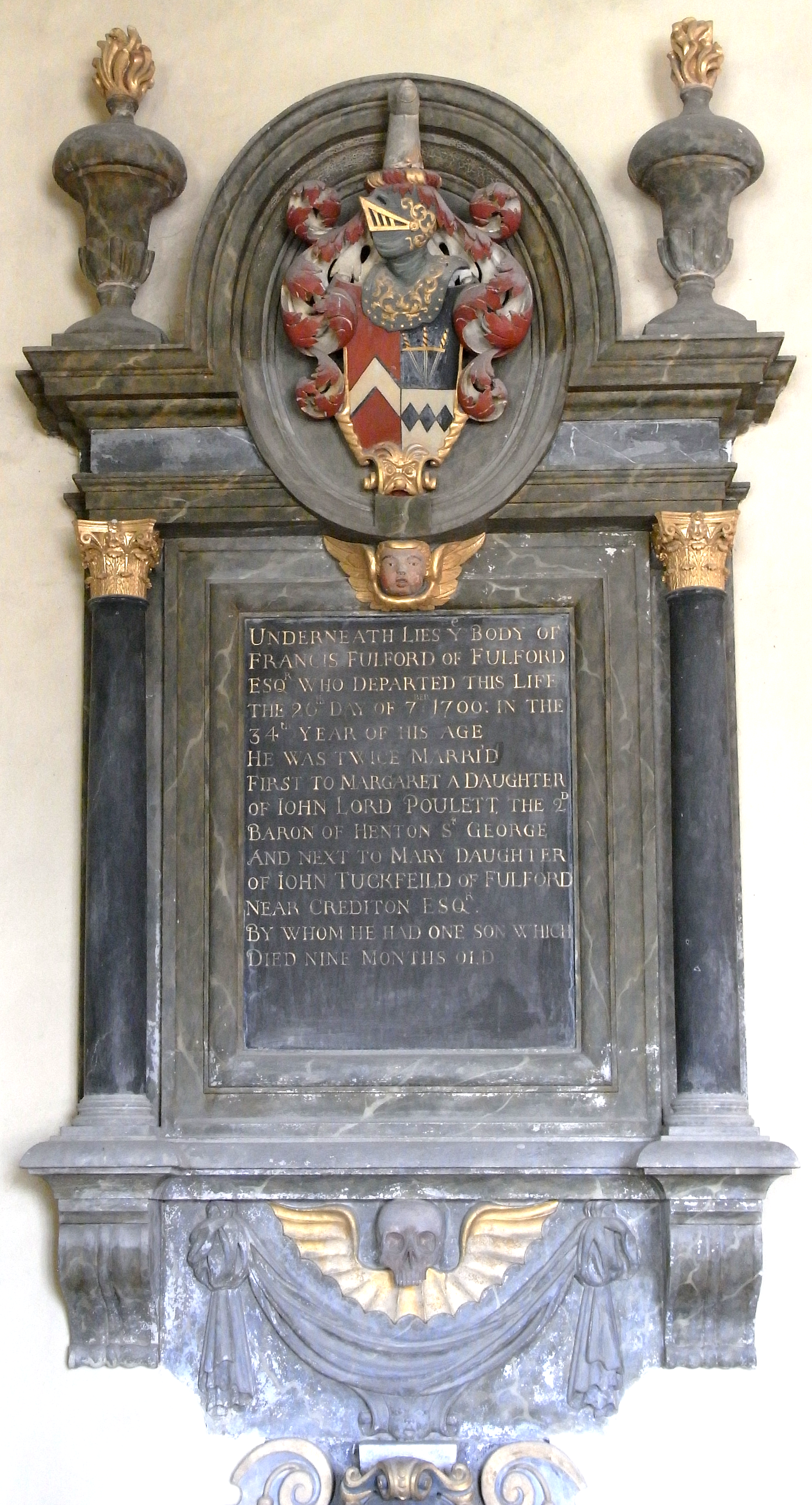
Mural monument to Col. Francis Fulford (1666–1700) in the Fulford Chapel of Dunsford Church

Col. Francis Fulford (1666–1700) (son), twice MP for Callington in Cornwall in 1690–5 and 1698–1700, presumably upon the interest of the influential Rolle family of Heanton Satchville, Petrockstowe, Devon. Samuel Rolle (1646–1717) married in 1704 as his second wife Margaret Tuckfield, daughter of Roger Tuckfield, of Raddon, by whom he had a daughter and sole heiress Margaret Rolle, 15th Baroness Clinton (1709–1781). He was also Sheriff of Devon 1689–90 and Mayor of Exeter 1689–90. Col. Francis Fulford married twice, firstly to Margaret Poulett (died 1687), daughter either of John Poulett, 3rd Baron Poulett (c. 1641 – 1679) (per her husband's History of Parliament biography), or of John Poulett, 2nd Baron Poulett (1615–1665) (per her husband's mural monument in Dunsford Church), both of Hinton St. George, Somerset. A portrait of the 2nd Baron hangs in Great Fulford House. The marriage was without children. Secondly he married Mary Tuckfield, one of the two surviving daughters and co-heiress of John Tuckfield (1625–1675), of Fulford House, in the parish of Shobrooke (relatives of the Tuckfields of Raddon), by his wife Mary Pincombe, a daughter of John Pincombe (d.pre-1657), a barrister of the Middle Temple, of South Molton, Devon. According to the Devon topographer John Swete (died 1821), it was at this time "When the two Fulfords were the possession of one lord" that the epithets "Great" and "Little" were assigned to each property. According to Swete, Col. Fulford:

May reasonably be supposed to have a predilection for his own inherited mansion to which for the sake of distinction and pre-eminence he would annex the adjunct of 'Great'. Nor will it be consider'd as an appropriation ill-placed, if the reference be made to its superior magnificence and antiquity, in which latter boast it exceeded the other by three centuries.

By his second wife Mary Tuckfield he had one son John Fulford (1692–1693) who died an infant. Mary married secondly in 1704 to Henry Trenchard. Col. Francis Fulford repaired Great Fulford House after the extensive damage it suffered during the Civil War. He died without surviving children. His mural monument survives in the Fulford Chapel of Dunsford Church. Inscribed:

Underneath lies ye body of Francis Fulford of Fulford Esq^{r} who departed this life the 26th day of 7^{ber} 1700 in the 34th year of his age. He was twice marri'd. First to Margaret a daughter of John Lord Poulett the 2^{d} Baron of Henton StGeorge and next to Mary daughter of John Tuckfeild of Fulford near Crediton Esq^{r} by whom he had one son which died nine months old.

Above are shown the arms of Fulford impaling in chief Poulett (Sable, three swords pilewise points in base proper pomels and hilts or) and in base Tuckfield (Argent, three lozenges in fess sable) with the crest of Fulford above: A bear's head and neck erased sable muzzled or

==== Francis Fulford ====
Francis Fulford of Toller Fratrum, Dorset (Cousin: grandfather's nephew, son of George Fulford (1619-pre-1688)), who married, at Frampton, Dorset, on 31 August 1654, Susan Browne (b1626), a daughter of John Browne JP (1568–1659) and his wife Elizabeth, née Trenchard (1586–1656), herself a daughter of Sir George Trenchard and his wife Anne née Speke.

==== Francis Fulford (died 1730) ====
Francis Fulford (died 1730) (son), who married Catherine Swete, daughter of William Swete.

==== Francis Fulford (1704–1749) ====
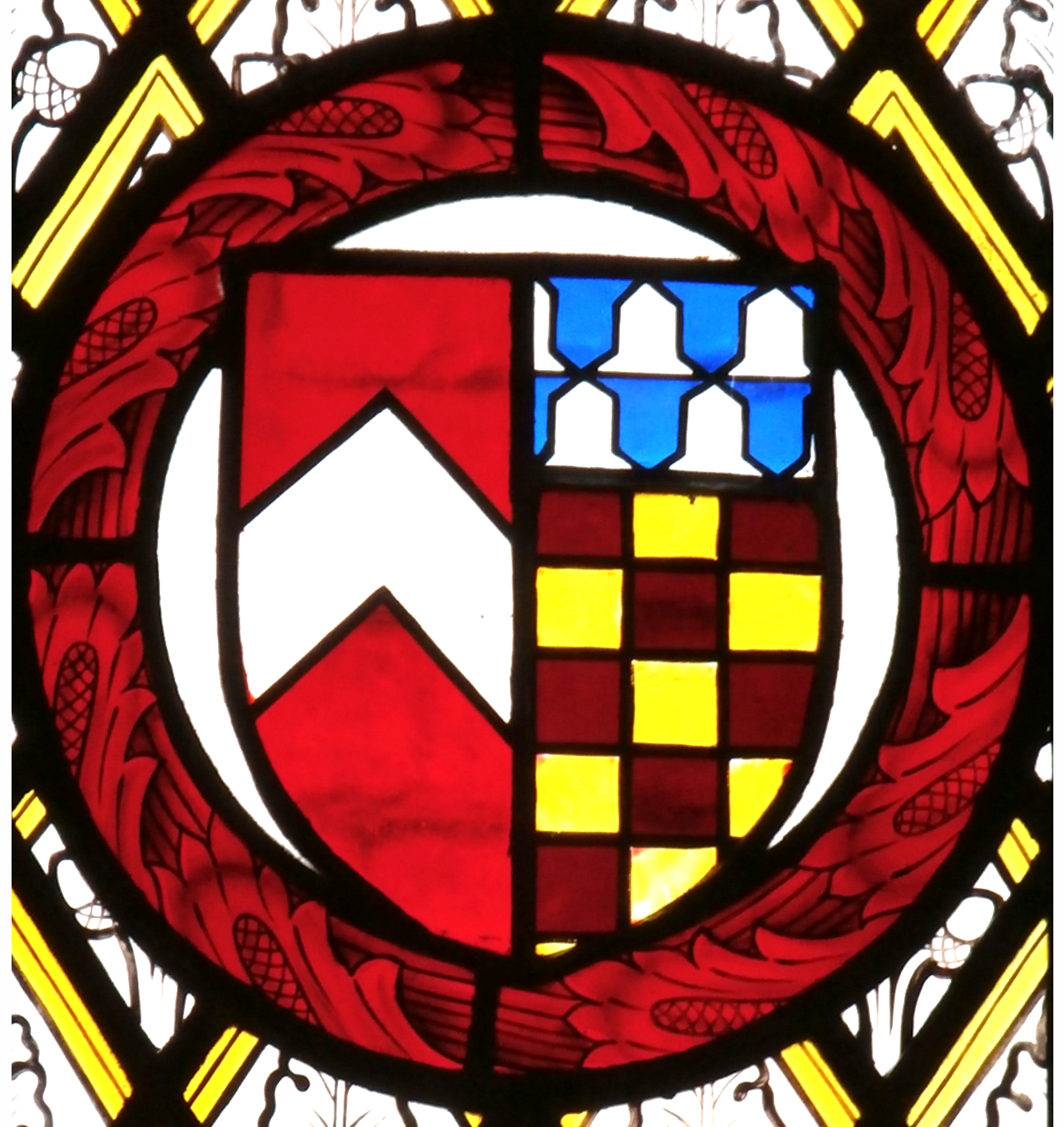
Arms of Fulford impaling Chichester (Chequy or and gules, a chief vair), 19th c. stained glass, east window of Fulford Chapel in Dunsford Church

Francis Fulford (1704–1749), Sheriff of Devon in 1744. He married Ann Chichester, a daughter of Sir Arthur Chichester, 3rd Baronet (died 1717), MP for Barnstaple of Youlston Park, Shirwell, from one of the most ancient and prominent families of North Devon, formerly of Raleigh, Pilton, near Barnstaple, which seat he sold in 1689 and moved to Youlston. He had 11 children, 8 sons (5 of whom died as infants) and 3 daughters, including:

- John Fulford (1736–1780), 4th and eldest surviving son and heir
- Francis Fulford (1738–1772), 5th son, Vicar of Dunsford.
- Benjamin Swete Fulford (born 1743), 8th son, who married Joanna Galpine, daughter of Thomas Galpine, and whose eldest son inherited Great Fulford on the death of his childless uncle John Fulford (1736–1780).
- Ann Fulford (born 1742), wife of Sir John Colleton, 4th Baronet (1738–1778)

==== John Fulford (1736–1780) ====
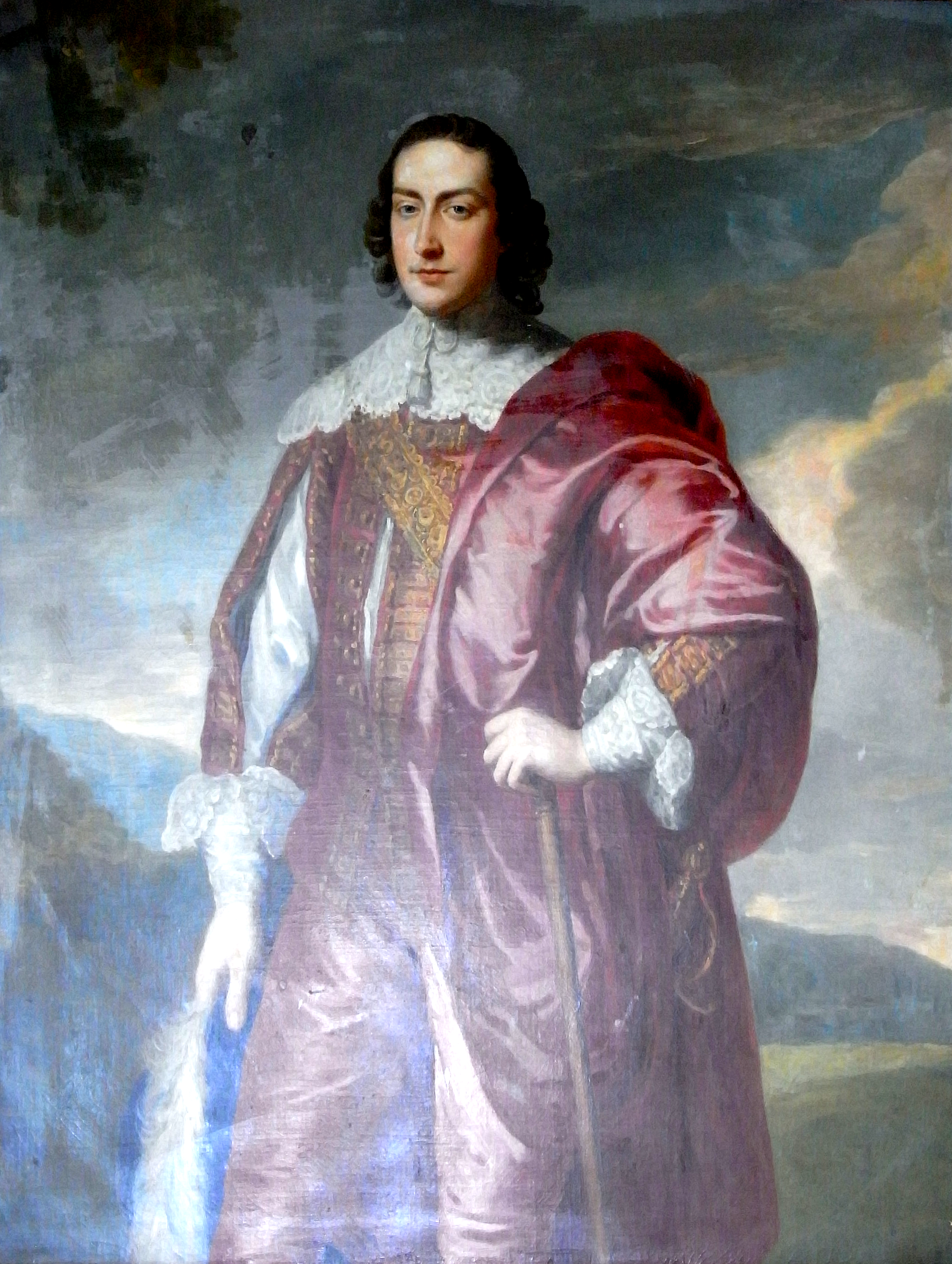
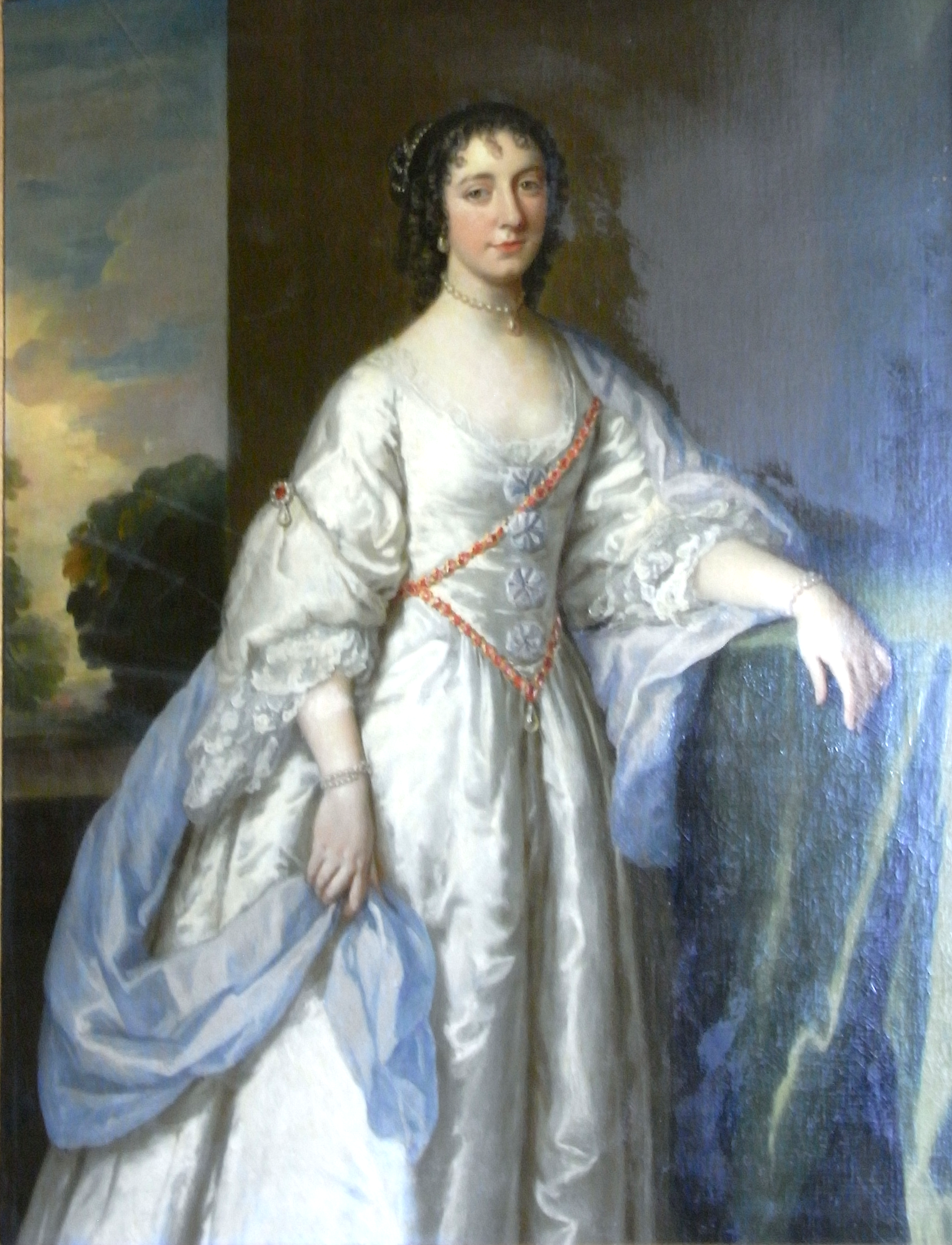
Left: John Fulford (1736–1780), Red Ruin; right: his wife Elizabeth Laroche (1731–1791). Portraits by Thomas Hudson (1701–1779), Great Fulford House

John Fulford (1736–1780) (4th and eldest surviving son), known as "Squire John" and "Red Ruin". He married Elizabeth Laroche (1731–1791), daughter of John Laroche. The marriage was without children. In the 1760s he spent lavishly on furnishing and landscaping Great Fulford, which included the creation of the lake and carriage drives through the park. He was one of the last in England to employ a full-time fool "dressed in the motley". In this unusual respect he resembled his contemporary Devonian John Arscott (1719–1788) of Tetcott, who kept as a member of his household a dwarf jester named Black John, whose eccentric ways were described in Footprints of Former Men in Cornwall (1870) by Robert Stephen Hawker, and also in Devonshire Characters and Strange Events (1908) by Sabine Baring-Gould. His portrait showing him dressed as a cavalier in a crimson costume survives at Great Fulford. He overspent and was forced to sell several of his unentailed estates, and moved with his wife to Italy to live more cheaply.

==== Col. Baldwin Fulford (1775–1847) ====
Col. Baldwin Fulford (1775–1847) (nephew, eldest son of Benjamin Swete Fulford, 8th and youngest son of Francis Fulford (1704–1749)). He was an officer in the Inniskillen Dragoons and was Lieutenant-Colonel of the Devon Militia. He married Anna Maria Adams, eldest daughter of William Adams (1752–1811), MP for Totnes, of Bowden House, Ashprington, near Totnes. He had 14 children, among whom was his second son Bishop Francis Fulford (1803–1868), Anglican Bishop of Montreal, Canada, whose son eventually inherited Great Fulford. In 1805, he employed the architect James Wyatt to remodel the house, which resulted in the removal of the gables and the addition of battlements to the parapets and bay windows at the corners, as presently exists. In 1838, he owned the additional estates of Melhuish, Hackworthy and Eggbeer, and in 1810, Lampford (in the parish of Cheriton Bishop), all adjacent to Great Fulford. His monument survives in Dunsford Church.

==== Col. Baldwin Fulford (1801–1871) ====
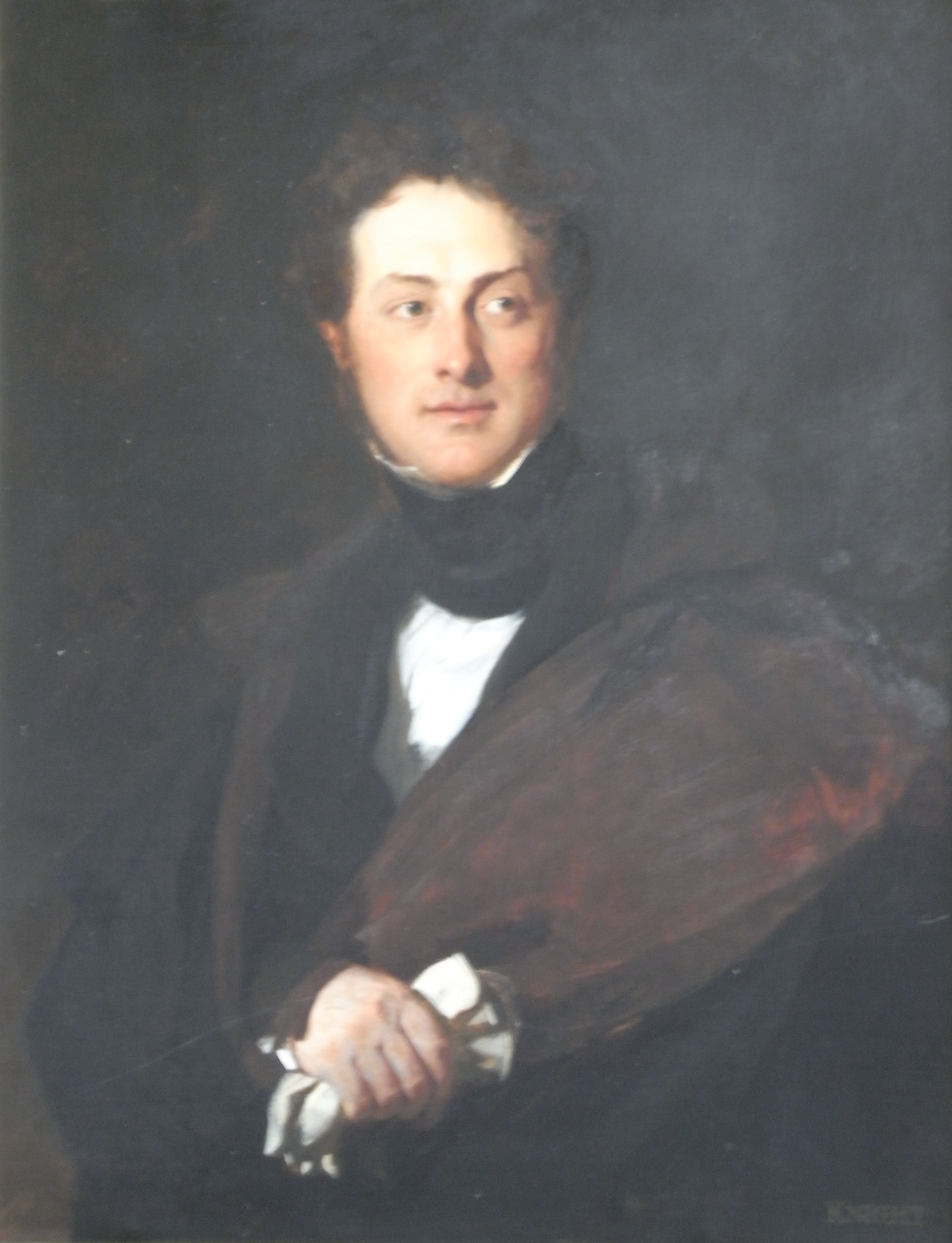
Col. Baldwin Fulford (1801–1871), "Baldwin the Bad". Portrait at Great Fulford House

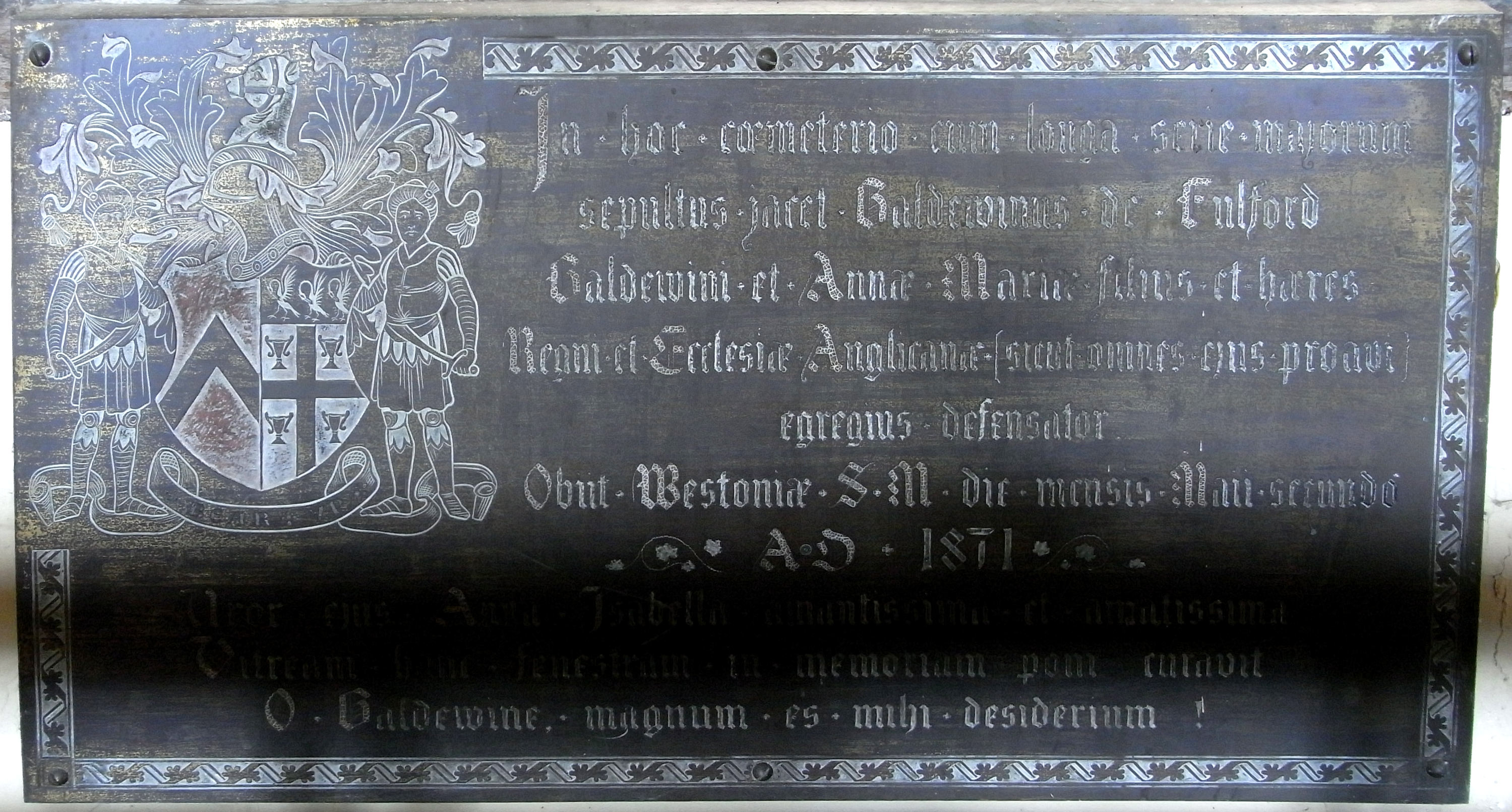
Monumental brass to Col. Baldwin Fulford (1801–1871), erected by his wife, in Dunsford Church

Col. Baldwin Fulford (1801–1871) (eldest son and heir), known as "Baldwin the Bad", a justice of the peace for Devon, Chairman of Quarter Sessions and Colonel of the 1st Royal Devon Yeomanry. In 1868, at the age of 67 he married Anna Isabella Giles, eldest daughter of the historian Rev. John Allen Giles (1808–1884), Doctor of Civil Law, Rector of Sutton in Surrey, but died three years later without children. As was the case with his great uncle Squire John, he was extravagant with his finances and by 1861 had accumulated over £60,000 of debts, which he fled the country to escape. The family's fortunes suffered from his legacy for the next century. His monumental brass survives in Dunsford Church inscribed in Latin as follows:

In hoc caemeterio cum longa serie majorum sepultus jacet Baldewinus de Fulford Baldewini et Annae Mariae filius et haeres, Regni et Ecclesiae Anglicanae (sicut omnes eius proavi) egregius defensator. Obiit Westoniae SM die mensis Maii secundo AD 1871. Uxor eius Anna Isabella amantissima et amatissima vitream hanc fenestram in memoriam poni curavit. O Baldewine magnum es mihi desiderium!". (In this cemetery with a long line of his elders lies buried Baldwin de Fulford, son and heir of Baldwin and of Anna Maria. An outstanding defender (just as were all his ancestors) of the Anglican Kingdom and Church. He died at Weston S(uper) M(are) [or S(o)m(erset)?], on the second day of May AD 1871. His wife Anna Isabella, most beloved and most loving, caused this glazed window to be erected in (his) memory. O Baldwin, a great loss you are to me!)

At the left side of the monumental brass is an heraldic achievement showing the arms of Fulford impaling Giles (Azure, a cross between four cups uncovered or on a chief argent three pelicans vulning themselves proper) with supporters two Saracens and crest of Fulford: A bear's head and neck erased. The window, depicting Biblical scenes, is on the north side of the Fulford Chapel.

==== Francis Fulford (1831–1907) ====
Francis Drummond Fulford (1831–1907) (nephew). He was the son and heir of Bishop Francis Fulford (1803–1868), Anglican Bishop of Montreal, Canada, by his wife Mary Drummond, eldest daughter of Andrew Berkeley Drummond of Cadlands, Hampshire (a grandson of William Drummond, 4th Viscount Strathallan (died 1746)) by his wife Mary Perceval a daughter of John Perceval, 2nd Earl of Egmont (1711–1770). He married Mary Anne Holland, daughter of Philip Holland of Cholderton Lodge, Montreal.

==== Francis Fulford (1861–1926) ====
Francis Algernon Fulford (1861–1926) (eldest son and heir). Born in Montreal, in 1897, he married Constance Drummond (died 1935).

==== Lt. Col. Francis Fulford (1898 –1969) ====
Lt. Col. Francis Edgar Anthony Fulford (1898 – 1969) (son), who married Joan Blackman, daughter of Rear-Admiral C. Maurice Blackman.

==== Francis Fulford (born 1952) ====
Francis Fulford (born 1952) (son and heir), the current owner, a former stockbroker and insurance broker who has appeared on reality television shows featuring his house and family. He has undertaken fund-raising activities, including opening the house on occasion to the public, in order to raise funds to make on-going restorations. He is the author of Bearing Up: The Long View (London, 2004), a work on estate management, agricultural economics, and the history of land ownership, one of the aims of which was "to give advice to owners (of big houses) and their heirs about how to survive and thrive" He is married to (Diana) Kishanda Tulloch (born 1960 in Tanzania), by whom he has four children, whose father William Tulloch was a colonial administrator in Tanzania, and was author of Nicholas and Kishanda: The Story of an Elephant (1966), a true story about an orphaned elephant calf found in the Kishanda Valley, now a national reserve for elephants in Tanzania.

== Sources ==
- Burke, John, A Genealogical and Heraldic History of the Commoners of Great Britain and Ireland Enjoying Territorial Possessions or High Official Rank but Uninvested with Heritable Honours, Volume 4, London, 1838, pp. 158–160, Fulford of Great Fulford
- Burke's Genealogical and Heraldic History of the Landed Gentry, 15th Edition, ed. Pirie-Gordon, H., London, 1937, pp. 847–8, pedigree of Fulford of Fulford.
- Pevsner, Nikolaus & Cherry, Bridget, The Buildings of England: Devon, London, 2004, pp. 458–9, Great Fulford
- Pole, Sir William (died 1635), Collections Towards a Description of the County of Devon, Sir John-William de la Pole (ed.), London, 1791, pp. 247–8, Fulford
- Prince, John, (1643–1723) The Worthies of Devon, 1810 edition, London, pp. 392–5, biography of "Fulford, Sir William, Knight".
- Risdon, Tristram (died 1640), Survey of Devon, 1811 edition, London, 1811, with 1810 Additions, pp. 128–9, 376
- Vivian, Lt.Col. J.L., (Ed.) The Visitations of the County of Devon: Comprising the Heralds' Visitations of 1531, 1564 & 1620, Exeter, 1895, pp. 378–81, pedigree of Fulford of Fulford
