= Robert Hardwick =

Retired Bishop of the Anglican Church of Canada

The Right Reverend Robert Hardwick
- Bishop of Qu'Appelle
- Church: Anglican Church of Canada
- Province: Rupert's Land
- Diocese: Qu'Appelle
- See: Regina, Saskatchewan
- Elected: 2012
- Predecessor: Greg Kerr-Wilson
- Successor: Helen Kennedy
- Previous posts: Rector, St. Stephen the Martyr, Swift Current (2001-2008); Vicar of Scawby, Redbourne and Hibaldstow, Lincolnshire (1997-2001); Assistant Curate, St John the Baptist, Beeston, Nottinghamshire (1993-97)

Orders
- Ordination: Deacon, 1993; Priest, 1994 by Bishop Patrick Harris
- Consecration: March 2, 2013 by David Ashdown, Archbishop of Keewatin, Metropolitan of Rupert's Land

Personal details
- Born: July 6, 1956
- Denomination: Anglican
- Residence: Regina, Saskatchewan
- Occupation: Clergyman
- Education: Diploma in Christian Ministry
- Alma mater: St John's College, Nottingham

Robert Hardwick is a retired bishop of the Anglican Church of Canada. He served as the 12th Bishop of the Diocese of Qu'Appelle, which covers much of the southern part of the Canadian province of Saskatchewan. Originally from England, he and his family moved to Canada in 2001, where he became parish priest at St Stephen the Martyr, Swift Current, Saskatchewan. In 2008 he was appointed executive archdeacon for the diocese and in 2012 he was elected Bishop of Qu'Appelle at an electoral synod. He retired in 2021.

== Early life and calling ==
Hardwick was born in England, near Nottingham. He initially worked as a machinist with the Royal Ordnance Factory in Nottingham, and then as a police officer with the Nottingham Constabulary.

He first felt a calling towards the church when serving as part of the security detail for the papal visit of Pope John Paul II to England in 1982. He has stated that life was not going well for him, describing it as a "rough time" for him and his wife. Then he was assigned to the security detail for a papal event where more than one million people were waiting to see the pope: "As the morning wore on and people were singing, I began thinking these people have something that I need to have. They had joy, they were friendly, faithful. There was singing, in Latin and English and there was such colour and beauty, a day which was beyond my experience." At the close of the day, a nun came up to him and said that she would pray for him. “I began to think why would a nun want to pray for me? What have I done wrong?" He went home and described his experiences to his wife, and they began to attend a local Church of England parish.

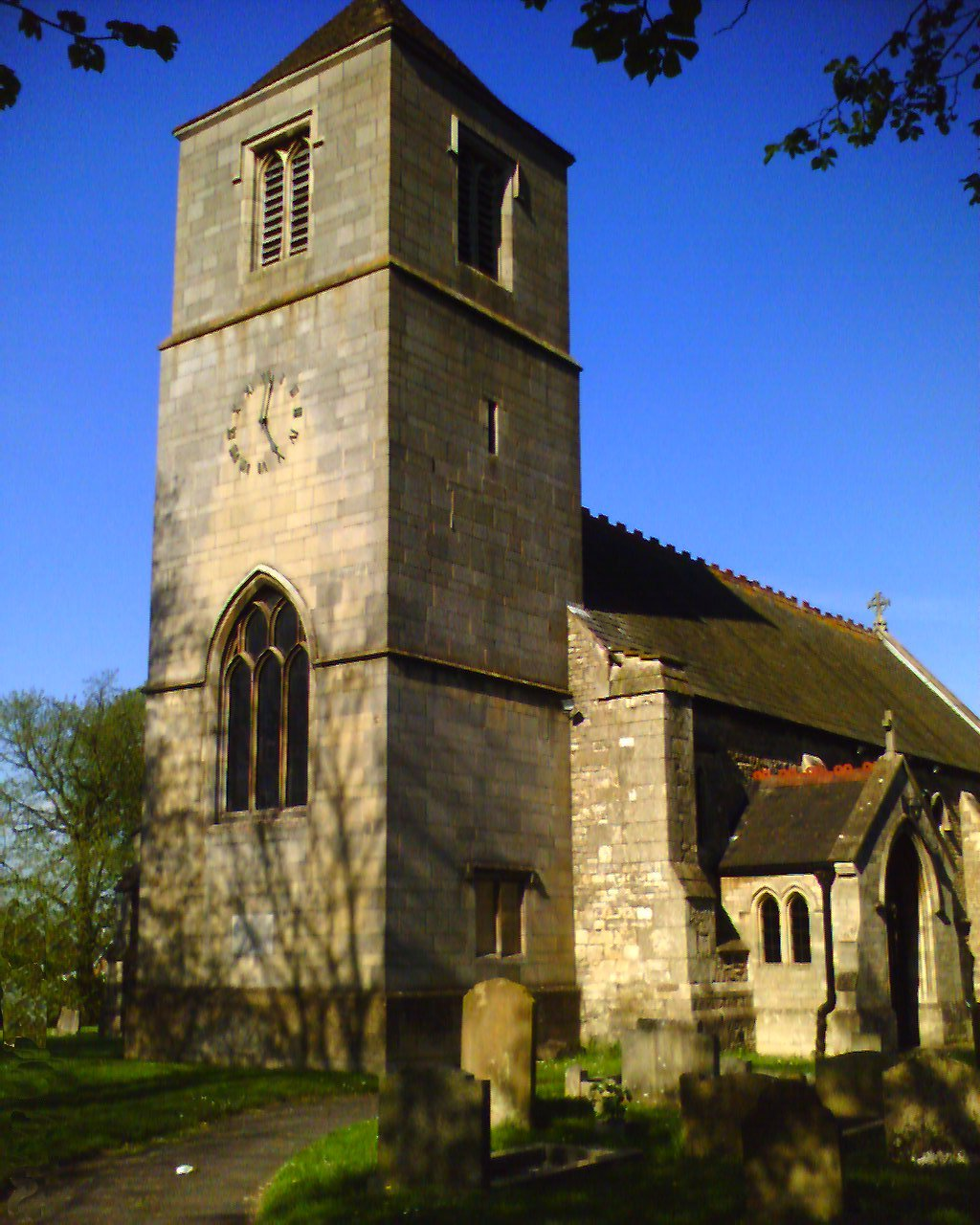
St Hybald's Church Tower, Hibaldstow

He gradually felt a calling which led him to the priesthood. He attended St John's College, Nottingham, a theological college with an emphasis on open evangelism. Hardwick was ordained a priest in the Church of England in the Diocese of Southwell in 1994, having been ordained deacon the year before. He first served as assistant curate at St John the Baptist in Beeston, Nottinghamshire (1993–97), and then as vicar of Scawby, Redbourne and Hibaldstow, in Lincolnshire (1997-2001).

== Move to Canada and Work within the Diocese ==
Hardwick and his wife had been considering a move to Canada, and he eventually sent an application to the Anglican church in Kimberley, British Columbia. By a chapter of accidents, his application ended up in Swift Current. On a phone call from the Swift Current church, after 20 minutes then-Bishop Duncan Wallace said, "We want you here." The Hardwick family moved to Canada three months later, in 2001. He took up the position of rector of St. Stephen the Martyr in Swift Current, Saskatchewan. In 2008, he was appointed executive archdeacon by Bishop Greg Kerr-Wilson and the family moved to Regina, Saskatchewan, the see of the Diocese of Qu'Appelle. As archdeacon, he was heavily involved in the production of a new Mission Action Plan for the Diocese.

== Election and consecration ==
Following the transfer of Bishop Kerr-Wilson to the Diocese of Calgary, a special electoral synod was held in the Diocese of Qu'Appelle. The synod met on December 8, 2012 and elected Hardwick on the first ballot, choosing him over the five other candidates.

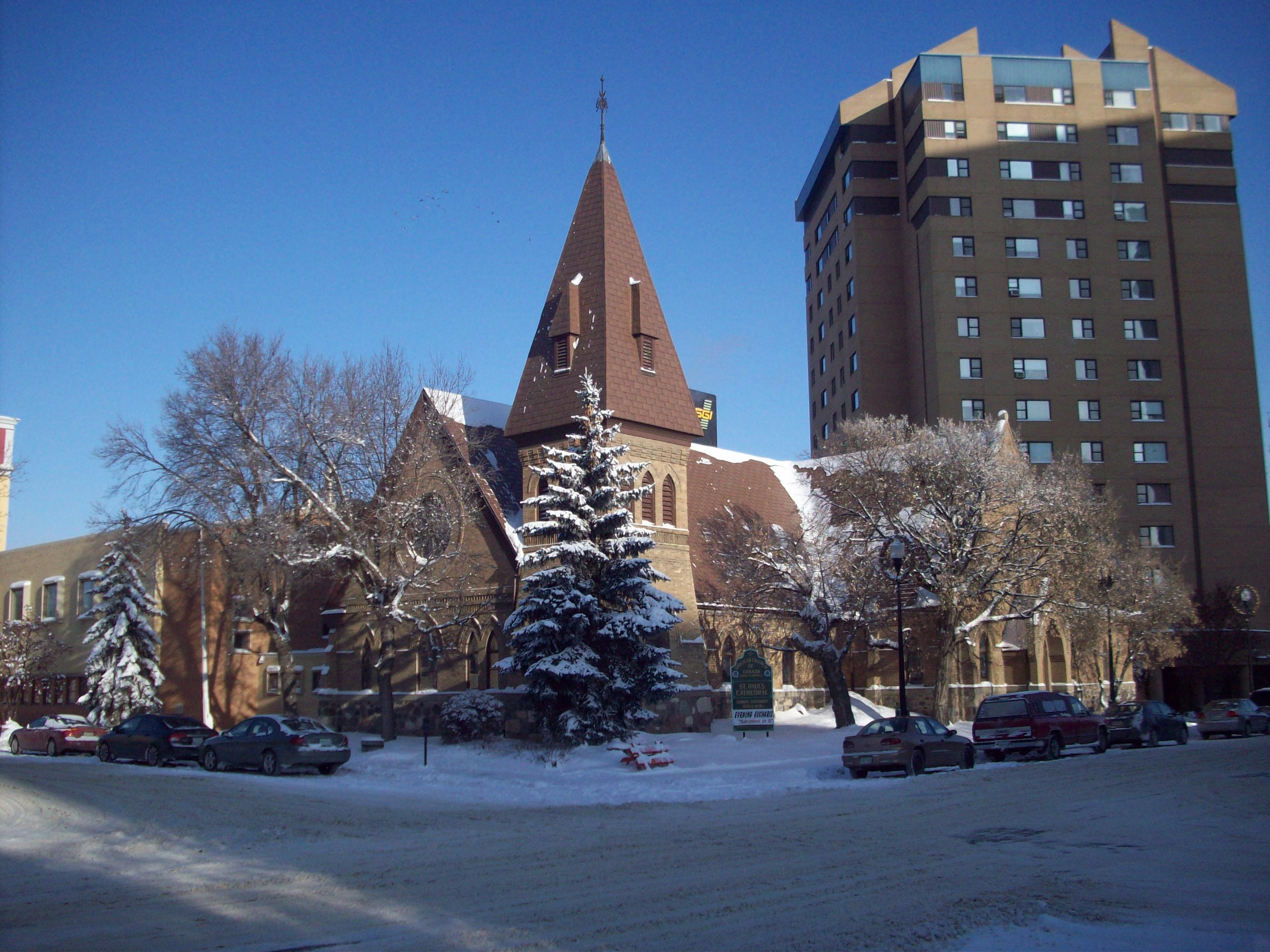
St Paul's Cathedral, Regina

Hardwick was consecrated on March 2, 2013. The event was a large one, with over 350 in attendance, including many from Hardwick's former church in Swift Current. Prior to the consecration, diocesan First Nations Elders performed a traditional smudge ceremony. Twenty Anglican bishops participated in the consecration service, including the Primate of the Anglican Church, Archbishop Fred Hiltz. The service was also attended by four of Hardwick's predecessors as Bishop of Qu'Appelle (Michael Peers, Eric Bays, Duncan Wallace, and Greg Kerr-Wilson), the first time in the history of the Anglican Church of Canada that so many former bishops had attended a consecration of their successor in the see. Archbishop David Ashdown, Metropolitan of the Province of Rupert's Land, led the consecration. Bishop Jonathan Frost of Southampton, England, a friend of Hardwick from England, preached the sermon. The two had been ordained together as deacons in 1993.

Because of the size of the event, and the fact that the diocesan cathedral, St Paul's, was undergoing major construction, the service of consecration was held in a local Roman Catholic church, Holy Trinity. In addition to the numerous representatives of the Anglican church, there were also representatives from the Evangelical Lutheran Church of Canada, the Roman Catholic church, the Serbian Orthodox Church, the United Church of Canada, the Baptist church, the Salvation Army, the Regina Council of Churches, the federal and provincial governments, and the RCMP. Hardwick was installed as Bishop of Qu'Appelle the next day at St Paul's.

== Goals as Bishop ==
Upon his election, Hardwick confirmed that his goals included moving forward with the Mission Action Plan, particularly developing children and youth ministries and urban and reserve First Nations ministries; improving communication strategies; equipping the faithful for ministry, including parishes which did not have a parish priest; and developing a sustainable financial plan. He noted that when he moved to Canada in 2001, he had been warned that the diocese was on the verge of bankruptcy, but was now in much better shape. In an interview after his election, he was asked what he would bring to the episcopacy. He described himself as a “missioner, an innovator, an encourager of collaborative ministry, a prayerful team player and a man passionate about Christian stewardship.” He added that others have said he is a good pastor, a good listener, a good preacher and someone who is unflappable and has a sense of humour.
