= Greg Kerr-Wilson =

Archbishop in the Anglican Church of Canada

The Most Reverend Greg Kerr-Wilson
- Archbishop of Calgary; Metropolitan of the Northern Lights
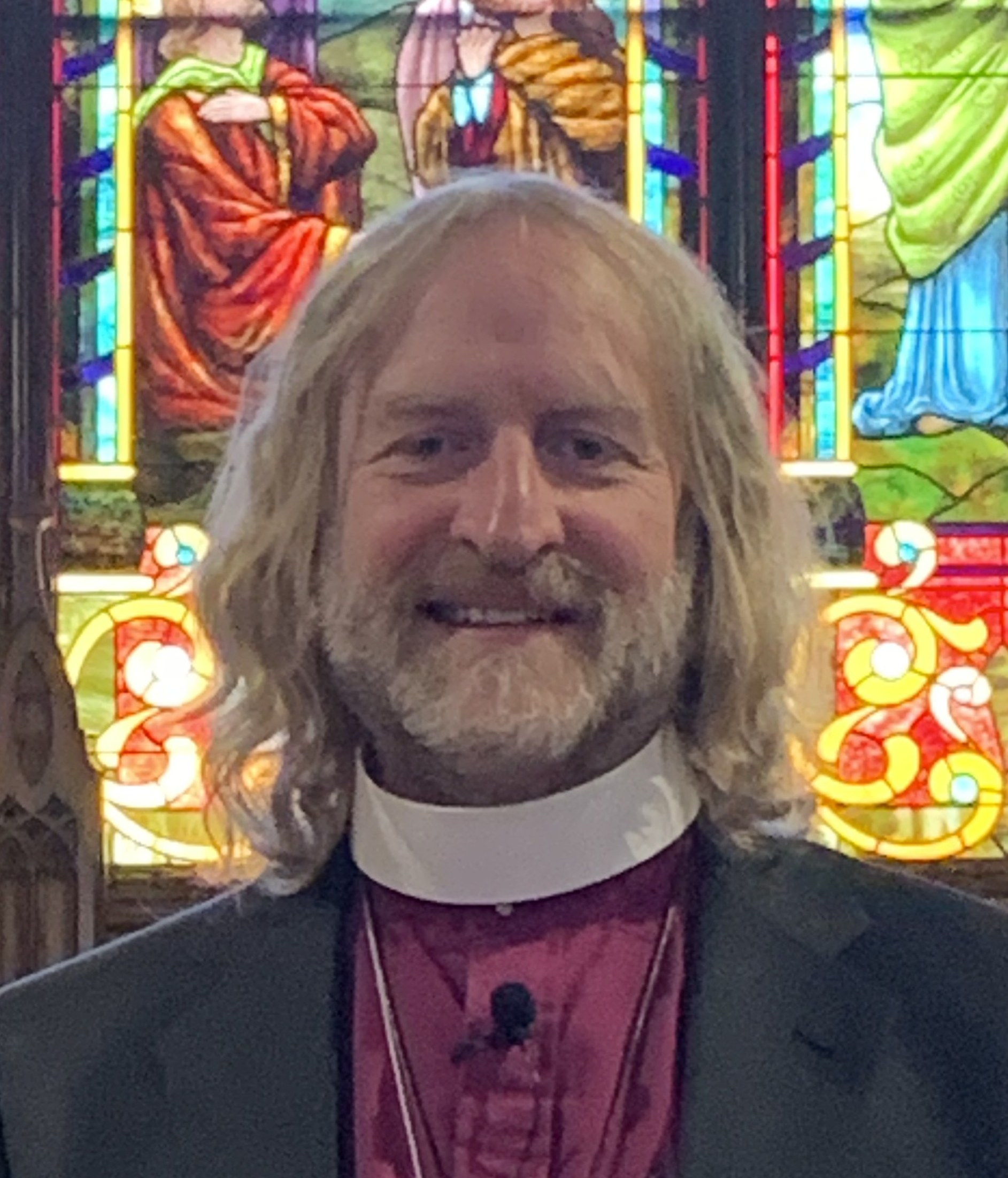
- Kerr-Wilson in 2021
- Church: Anglican Church of Canada
- Province: Northern Lights
- Diocese: Calgary
- Elected: Bishop of Calgary (2012); Metropolitan of the Province of the Northern Lights (2015)
- Predecessor: David Ashdown (as metropolitan)
- Other posts: Bishop of Qu'Appelle (2006–2012); Dean of Edmonton (1998–2006)

Orders
- Ordination: 14 May 1989 (diaconate); 13 May 1990 (priesthood); by Terence Finlay
- Consecration: 23 May 2006 by John Clarke

Personal details
- Born: 1960 or 1961 (age 65–66) Winnipeg, Manitoba, Canada
- Spouse: Vicki Kerr-Wilson
- Children: 3
- Education: University of British Columbia (B.A.Sc.); Nashotah House (M.Div.)

Ordination history
History
Diaconal ordination
- Ordained by: Terence Finlay
Priestly ordination
- Ordained by: Terence Finlay
Episcopal consecration
- Consecrated by: John Clarke
Episcopal succession
Bishops consecrated by Greg Kerr-Wilson as principal consecrator
- William Cliff: March 1, 2016
- Sidney Black: June 3, 2017
- Geoffrey Woodcroft: October 12, 2018
- Chris Harper: November 17, 2018
- David Greenwood: February 21, 2020
- Stephen London: September 18, 2021
- Helen Kennedy: January 22, 2022
- Rachael Parker: March 18, 2024
- Richard Reed: September 6, 2024
- Alexander Pryor: May 11, 2025
- Jared Osborn: May 11, 2025
- Ann Martha Keenainak: May 11, 2025
- Chad McCharles: June 14, 2025
- Naboth Manzongo: September 13, 2025

Gregory Keith Kerr-Wilson is a Canadian Anglican bishop. Since 2012, he has been bishop of Calgary, and since 2015, he has been archbishop of Calgary and metropolitan of the Ecclesiastical Province of the Northern Lights in the Anglican Church of Canada. Earlier in his career, he was bishop of Qu'Appelle and dean of Edmonton and rector of All Saints' Anglican Cathedral in Edmonton. He was twice a candidate for Primate of the Anglican Church of Canada.

== Early life and education ==
Kerr-Wilson was born in Winnipeg and raised in an Anglican family in Saskatoon and Vancouver. He received a bachelor of applied science from the University of British Columbia in 1985. Kerr-Wilson experienced a call to ordained ministry in the Diocese of New Westminster and married Vicki, a fellow UBC graduate, c. 1986, after which they moved to Wisconsin for his seminary studies at Nashotah House. Kerr-Wilson completed his theological training at Trinity College, Toronto, and was ordained to the diaconate in 1989 and the priesthood in 1990. The Kerr-Wilsons also had three now-grown children.

== Ordained ministry ==
Kerr-Wilson began his ministry as curate of St. Paul's, Bloor Street, Toronto. He then was rector of the Church of the Holy Family, Brampton. In that role, he was for nearly two years regional dean of North Peel in the Diocese of Toronto. At Holy Family, he helped the congregation become financially self-sustaining. He was also active as liturgical consultant for the Credit Valley area and a member of the liturgy planning committee for the 1994 visit of Archbishop of Canterbury George Carey to Toronto. He headed west to become dean of Edmonton and rector of All Saints' Cathedral in 1998. During his years as dean, he served as bishop's commissary during a leave of absence by Bishop Victoria Matthews.

=== Episcopacy ===
Kerr-Wilson was elected bishop of Qu'Appelle in November 2005 and consecrated a bishop at St. Paul's Cathedral in Regina, Saskatchewan, in May 2006. In June 2012, he was elected bishop of Calgary, and his enthronement at the Cathedral Church of the Redeemer occurred on September 29, 2012. In 2017, he presided over the election and consecration of Sidney Black as the first-ever First Nations suffragan bishop for the Diocese of Calgary.

In June 2015, Kerr-Wilson was elected metropolitan of Rupert's Land, later renamed the Province of the Northern Lights. He has also been lead bishop for science representing the ACC on the Anglican Communion Science Commission.

Kerr-Wilson has twice been a candidate for primate of the ACC, first in 2019 (when Linda Nicholls was elected) and again in the June 2025 election by the General Synod (when Shane Parker was elected). In 2025, he proposed that the primate should no longer be a bishop without see and should return to being selected from among the ACC's diocesan bishops. If elected, he pledged to serve a single three-year term focused on making the necessary changes so that the 2028 General Synod would be able to elect a new primate under a new structure.

=== Churchmanship ===
Kerr-Wilson has described himself as "an Evangelical, Charismatic Catholic, with liberal and conservative tendencies."

Kerr-Wilson has maintained a middle ground on same-sex marriage, affirming "the real goods that are present within same sex relationships" while declining to grant permission to bless same-sex couples or perform same-sex marriages. In October 2017, Kerr-Wilson sent a pastoral letter to the diocese of Calgary on same-sex marriage and the pastoral care of LGBT persons in the diocese. "As baptized members of our Church we all together, regardless of sexual orientation, share in the Holy Eucharist, are gifted for ministry, and receive the pastoral ministry of the Church, offered in the sacraments, in spiritual counsel, direction and teaching," he wrote. However, since sacramental rites "are offered to the whole of the Church for building it up and healing the brokenness of its members," he said the ACC's canon on marriage constrained the diocese. "Diocesan Synods do not, in our church, have the authority to make decisions on doctrinal matters. Further, it is not within the Diocesan Synod’s authority to grant permission to clergy to perform public liturgical acts." He instead suggested the development of "some intercessory prayers for use in the context of a Eucharistic celebration [to] ask God’s grace for the couple as they seek to grow in their faith and in their partnership." Shortly thereafter, the Calgary diocesan synod approved a motion with 57 percent of the vote asking Kerr-Wilson to authorize clergy to perform blessings of same-sex couples.

In the wake of an insufficient majority in the 2019 General Synod to change the ACC's canon on marriage—leaving in place the status quo that recognizes marriage as between a man and a woman—Kerr-Wilson did not authorize same-sex blessings or recognition of marriage in the Diocese of Calgary as several dioceses did under a "local option." "For Calgary, this is an issue of much concern and hurt, particularly for the LGBT members of our church," Kerr-Wilson wrote following the 2019 General Synod. "I recognize and am deeply grieved by the pain this causes. We will, however, continue to abide by the terms of the Marriage Canon and the ACoC constitutional commitments and documents on which it rests." As of 2025, the Calgary diocese continued to hold the traditional position on the marriage canon.

== Works ==
- Holeton, David; Hall, Catherine; Kerr-Wilson, Gregory (2020). Let Us Give Thanks: A Presider’s Manual for the BAS Eucharist. Eugene, Oregon: Wipf and Stock. ISBN 9781725267503.

Anglican Communion titles
Preceded by Harold T. Munn	Dean of Edmonton; 1998–2006	Succeeded by Jane Alexander
Preceded by Duncan Wallace	Bishop of Qu’Appelle; 2006–2012	Succeeded by Robert Hardwick
Preceded by Derek Hoskin	Bishop of Calgary; 2012–present	Incumbent
Preceded by David Ashdown	Metropolitan of the Northern Lights; 2015–present	Incumbent
