= David Greenwood (bishop) =

Canadian Anglican bishop (born 1963)

The Right Reverend David Greenwood
- Bishop of Athabasca
- Church: Anglican Church of Canada
- Province: Northern Lights
- Diocese: Athabasca
- In office: Since 2020
- Predecessor: Fraser Lawton

Orders
- Ordination: 2004 (diaconate); 2015 (priesthood)
- Consecration: 21 February 2020 by Greg Kerr-Wilson

Personal details
- Born: 14 September 1963 (age 62) Camrose, Alberta, Canada

David Adrian Greenwood (born 14 September 1963) is a Canadian Anglican bishop and IT professional. In 2020 he became bishop of the Diocese of Athabasca in northern Alberta.

== Biography ==
Greenwood was born in Camrose, Alberta, in 1963. He married Benita at age 19, and they had four children and eventually 14 grandchildren. In 1988, the Greenwoods moved to Fort McMurray, where David spent 30 years working in information technology for Syncrude Canada as a programmer, systems designer and architect, and supervisor.

Greenwood began studying for ordination in the 1990s. In 2004, he was ordained as a vocational deacon, and in 2015 as a priest at St. James' Cathedral in the town of Peace River. Greenwood was priest in charge of All Saints' Church in Athabasca. He was consecrated as a bishop on 21 February 2020 in St. James' Cathedral.

Anglican Communion titles
Preceded by Fraser Lawton	Bishop of Athabasca; Since 2020	Incumbent
