= Jane Alexander (bishop) =

Former Bishop of the Anglican Church of Canada

The Right Reverend Jane Alexander
- Bishop of Edmonton
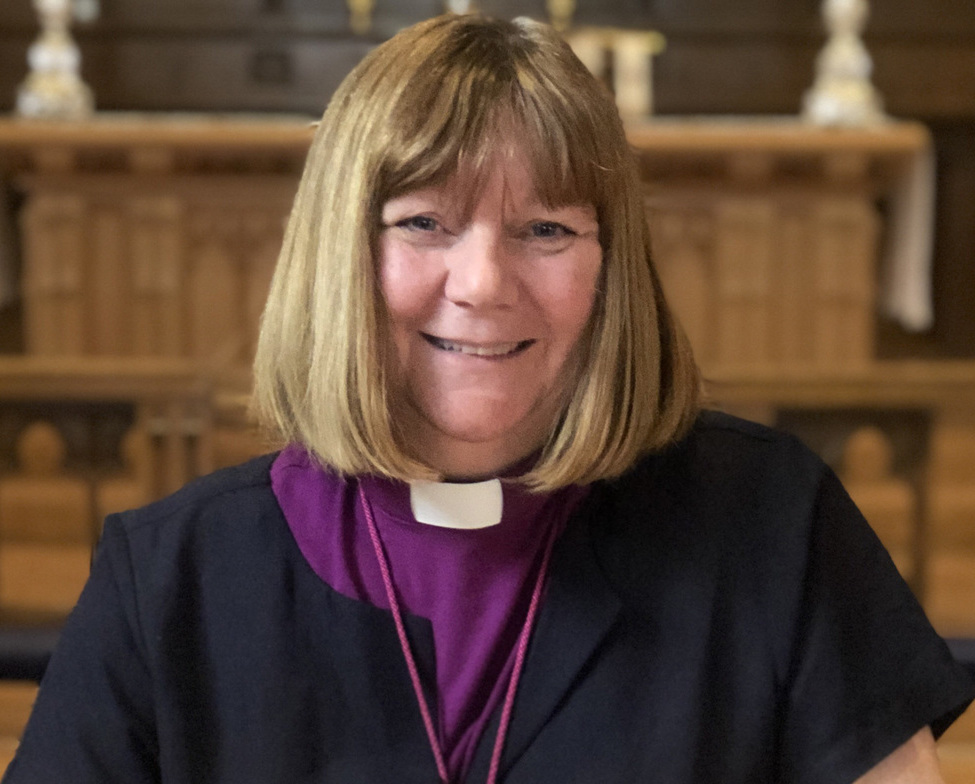
- Church: Anglican Church of Canada
- Diocese: Edmonton
- See: Edmonton
- In office: 2008–2021
- Predecessor: Victoria Matthews
- Successor: Stephen London
- Previous posts: Bishop of Edmonton; Dean of Edmonton and Rector of All Saints' Cathedral

Orders
- Ordination: 2001
- Consecration: 2008 by John Robert Clarke

Personal details
- Born: March 29, 1959 (age 67)

Jane Alexander (born 29 March 1959) is a British-Canadian Anglican bishop. She is a former Bishop of Edmonton, a bishop of the Anglican Church of Canada. She was installed on May 11, 2008, at All Saints' Anglican Cathedral.

Until her consecration as a bishop, Alexander served as Dean of Edmonton and Rector of All Saints' Cathedral. She is the first female diocesan bishop to succeed another female diocesan bishop in the Anglican Communion.

On 26 January 2020, Alexander announced her resignation as Bishop of Edmonton effective 31 July 2020. However, on 17 March 2020, she postponed her resignation until 31 December 2020 citing the ongoing COVID-19 pandemic. Her resignation as Bishop of Edmonton took effect on 16 April 2021.

== Early life and teaching career ==
Alexander grew up in England and attended Brunts Grammar School in Mansfield. As a child, she was forbidden from attending any religious classes at school by her father. It was not until she was 25 that she was baptized with her eldest child in the Church of England.

Alexander graduated from Newcastle University in 1980 with a Bachelor of Arts degree with honours, having completed a thesis on English liturgical music from 1370 to 1430. She then worked as a music teacher, eventually specializing in special education.

After moving to Canada with her family in 1990, Alexander earned a Master of Education degree in 1993, followed by a Ph.D. degree in educational psychology in 1996, both from the University of Alberta. She then worked as a professor in educational psychology at the University of Alberta.

== Ministry ==
In 1998, Alexander was ordained as a deacon. She was ordained as a priest in 2001 after earning her Masters of Theological Studies from Newman Theological College, a private Roman Catholic college. She worked at a number of parishes in the Diocese of Edmonton. In 2006 she was appointed Dean of All Saints' Cathedral in Edmonton. Before her ordination to the episcopate, she was involved in a movement to eliminate poverty in Edmonton caused by inequality. According to statistical data, it is the most unequal province in the country. She took leadership in a Call To End Poverty in Edmonton leading to coming up with concrete proposals on many fronts, including early childhood education, daycare, living wage, affordable transit and job training.

=== Episcopate ===
In 2007, Bishop Victoria Matthews resigned as Bishop of Edmonton and Alexander became diocesan administrator in her capacity as dean of the diocese. She was elected to be the next bishop on 8 March 2008 on the third ballot.

Alexander was consecrated as a bishop at All Saints' Cathedral and formally installed as Bishop of Edmonton on 11 May 2008, the feast of Pentecost.

Alexander's succeeding of Matthews as Bishop of Edmonton was the first instance in the Anglican Communion in which a female diocesan bishop succeeded another. Matthews was Alexander's ordaining bishop for her diaconal and priestly ordinations and was a co-consecrator for her episcopal ordination.

Alexander was going to step down as Bishop of Edmonton on 31 December 2020. However, due to the pandemic, she decided to stay on as Bishop of Edmonton to support the diocese. She stepped down as bishop on 16 April 2021.

In January 2022, Alexander was appointed interim bishop for the Territory of the People, after Lincoln Mckoen resigned the See following allegations of misconduct.

== Consecrators ==
- The Most Reverend John Robert Clarke, 10th Archbishop of Athabasca and 15th Metropolitan of Rupert's Land
- The Right Reverend Gregory Kerr-Wilson, 11th Bishop of Qu'Appelle (Previously Dean of Edmonton and Rector of All Saints' Cathedral)
- The Right Reverend Victoria Matthews (9th Bishop of Edmonton; Bishop-Elect of Christchurch Diocese, New Zealand)

Religious titles
Preceded by Gregory Kerr-Wilson	Dean and Rector of All Saints' Cathedral; 2006–2008	Succeeded by Lee Bezanson
Preceded by Victoria Matthews	Bishop of Edmonton, Canada; 2008–2021	Succeeded by Stephen London
