= Arthur Burgett =

Canadian Anglican bishop

Orders
- Consecration: 13 January 1932 by Isaac Stringer

Arthur Edward Burgett (1869 – 13 December 1942) was an Anglican bishop serving Alberta, Canada, in the first half of the 20th century.

Burgett was born in Calcutta and educated at Radley and Trinity Hall, Cambridge, and ordained after a period of study at Ripon College Cuddesdon in 1898.

After eight years in the Duke of Wellington's West Riding Regiment he served a curacy in Tottenham. Moving to Canada he was a missionary within the Anglican Diocese of Quebec and Chaplain to the Bishop 1914. He was Rector of St Paul's, Quebec, and then Archdeacon of Assiniboia from 1918 to 1924 and of Edmonton North until his appointment to the episcopate as the second Bishop of Edmonton.

Burgett was made a deacon in 1897 and ordained a priest in Lent 1898 – both times by Mandell Creighton, Bishop of London, at St Paul's Cathedral; He was consecrated a bishop on 13 January 1932 by Isaac Stringer, Archbishop of Rupert's Land, at All Saints' Pro-Cathedral, Edmonton, and installed there at the same service.

Religious titles
Preceded by Henry Gray	Bishop of Edmonton (Alberta); 1932–1941	Succeeded by Walter Barfoot
