= Howard Clark (bishop) =

Canadian Anglican bishop (1901–1983)

The Most Reverend Howard Clark CC
- Primate of the Anglican Church of Canada

Personal details
- Born: Howard Hewlett Clark; April 23, 1901 Fort Macleod, Alberta, Canada
- Died: January 21, 1983 (aged 81)

Howard Hewlett Clark CC (April 23, 1901 – January 21, 1983) was Primate of the Anglican Church of Canada from 1959 to 1971.

Born in Fort Macleod, Alberta, Clark attended the University of Trinity College in Toronto. He was first appointed Curate of St. John the Baptist Norway in Toronto, Ontario in 1930. In 1932 he was made Curate of Christ Church Cathedral in Ottawa. He became Priest-in-Charge in 1938, Rector in 1939, and Dean and Rector from 1945 to 1953. He was Bishop of the Diocese of Edmonton from 1954 to 1961 and Bishop of Rupert's Land from 1961 to 1970. He was elected Primate of the Anglican Church of Canada in 1959; and became metropolitan of Rupert's Land in 1961.

In 1970 Clark was made a Companion of the Order of Canada. From 1971 to 1982 he was Chancellor of Trinity College, Toronto.

Anglican Communion titles
Preceded by Edgar Frank Salmon	Dean of Ottawa; 1945–1953	Succeeded by John Anderson
Preceded by Walter Barfoot	Bishop of Edmonton, Canada; 1954–1961	Succeeded by Gerald Burch
Preceded by Walter Barfoot	Primate of the Anglican Church of Canada; 1959–1971	Succeeded by Ted Scott
Preceded by Walter Barfoot	Bishop of Rupert's Land; 1961–1969	Succeeded by Barry Valentine
Preceded by Walter Barfoot	Metropolitan of Rupert's Land; 1961–1969	Succeeded by Fredric Jackson
Academic offices
Preceded by Richard C. Berkinshaw	Chancellor of Trinity College, Toronto; 1971–1982	Succeeded by Robert Seaborn
