= Primate of Canada =

Primate of Canada may refer to:

- Catholic Primate of Canada
- Primate of the Anglican Church of Canada
- Primate of the Ukrainian Orthodox Church of Canada
