= Genge (disambiguation) =

Genge is a type of Nigerian music.

Genge may also refer to:

- Genge (surname)
- 6626 Mattgenge, an asteroid named after English astronomer Dr. Matthew Genge
- Genge, Democratic Republic of Congo, town in Katanga Province, Democratic Republic of Congo
