= Arthur Sovereign =

Canadian Anglican bishop

Orders
- Consecration: 6 January 1932 by Isaac Stringer

Arthur Henry Sovereign FRGS (1881 – 16 May 1966) was an Anglican priest in the mid-20th century. He was born in Woodstock, Ontario in 1881 and educated at the University of Toronto. Ordained in 1906, his first post was as a Curate at Christ Church Cathedral, Vancouver after which he was Rector of St Mark's, Vancouver. He was Professor of Divinity at the Anglican Theological College, Vancouver from 1930 until his appointment to the episcopate as Bishop of Yukon in 1932, but only held the post for ten months. From then until 1950 he was Bishop of Athabasca.

Religious titles
Preceded by Isaac Stringer	Bishop of Yukon; 1932–1933	Succeeded by William Geddes
Preceded by Robert Renison	Bishop of Athabasca; 1933–1950	Succeeded by Reginald Pierce
