= Diocese of Edmonton =

Diocese of Edmonton may refer to:

- Anglican Diocese of Edmonton
- Roman Catholic Archdiocese of Edmonton
