= Stephen London =

Bishop of Edmonton

The Right Reverend Stephen London
- Bishop of Edmonton
- Church: Anglican Church of Canada
- Diocese: Edmonton
- Elected: June 26, 2021
- In office: 2021–
- Predecessor: Jane Alexander

Orders
- Ordination: March 21, 2004 by Victoria Matthews
- Consecration: September 18, 2021 by Greg Kerr-Wilson

Personal details
- Born: McKinney, Texas, U.S.
- Denomination: Anglican
- Spouse: Stephanie London
- Children: 3

Stephen London is the eleventh and current bishop of the Anglican Diocese of Edmonton, having been elected in 2021.

== Life and career ==
London was born in 1973 in McKinney, Texas, in the United States. He earned a Bachelor of Arts in Philosophy and German Language and Literature from Wittenberg University, a Master of Arts in Philosophy from Miami University, and a Master of Divinity from Yale University Divinity School. London was ordained as a deacon in the Episcopal Diocese of Connecticut by Andrew Smith on June 21, 2003. In 2004, he moved to Canada, and on March 21, 2004, was ordained a priest for the Diocese of Edmonton by Victoria Matthews. He served as rector of St. Michael and All Angels in Edmonton from 2004 to 2012, and as rector of St. Thomas in Sherwood Park from 2012 to 2021. During his time as a priest in the Diocese of Edmonton, London served on various ecumenical committees, including with the Lutheran, Roman Catholic, and Moravian churches.

He is married to the Rev. Stephanie London, also an Anglican priest. They have three children.

In June 2021, London was elected from a pool of eight candidates as the eleventh bishop of the Diocese of Edmonton, succeeding Jane Alexander. He was consecrated a bishop on September 18, 2021, with Greg Kerr-Wilson, the Archbishop of Calgary, as the principal consecrating bishop. Archbishops Linda Nicholls, former Primate of the Anglican Church of Canada, and Mark MacDonald, former National Indigenous Anglican Archbishop, were present. Due to the COVID-19 pandemic, the service was only open to a limited number of people.
