= All Saints' Anglican Cathedral (Edmonton) =

All Saints' Anglican Cathedral, Edmonton, Alberta, Canada
- Cathedral Church of All Saints, Edmonton
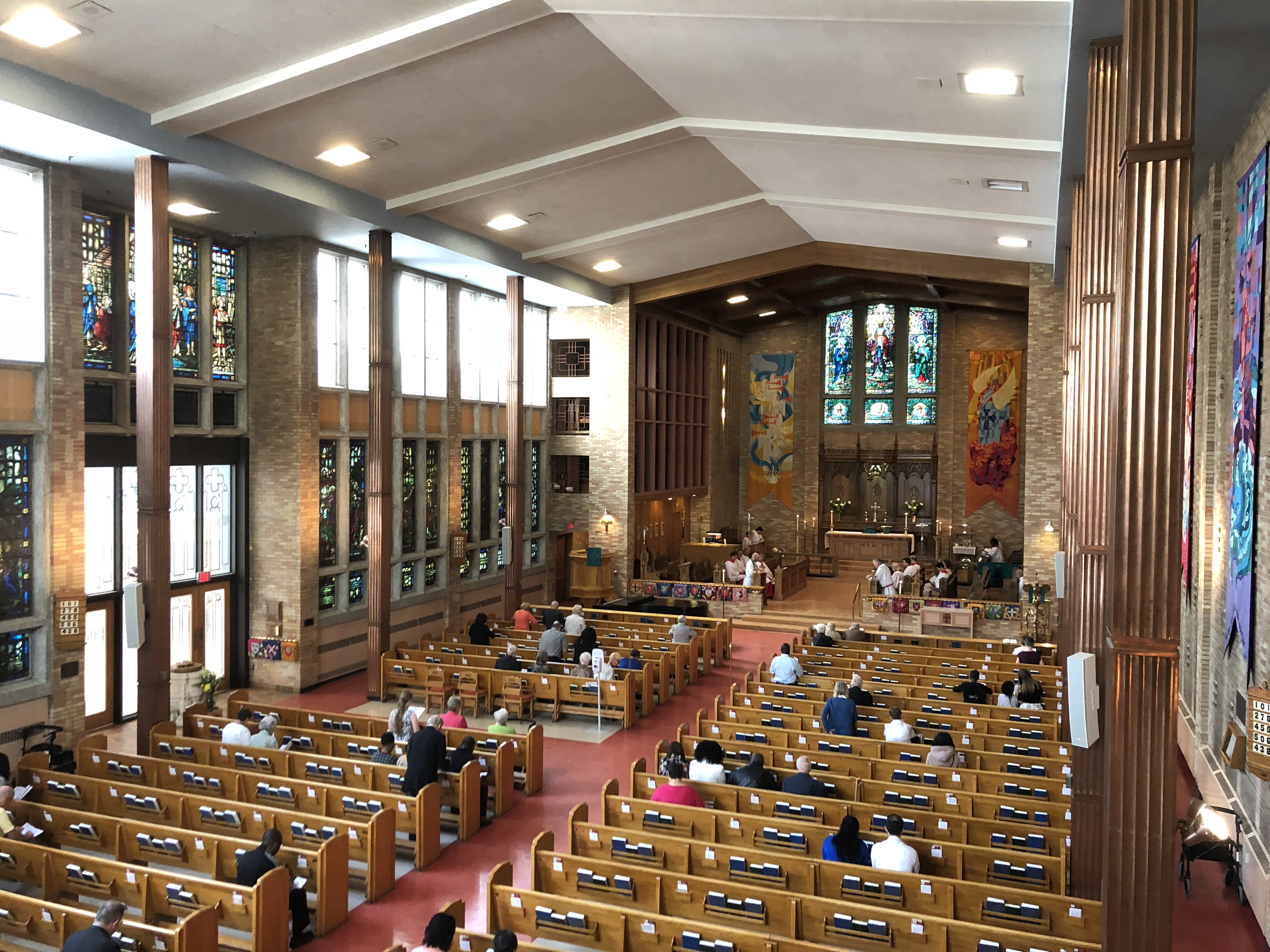
- All Saints' Anglican Cathedral

- 53.5396°N 113.4971°W
- Denomination: Anglican Church of Canada
- Churchmanship: Broad Church
- Website: allsaintscathedral.ca

History
- Dedication: All Saints
- Dedicated: 10 May 1956

Administration
- Province: Northern Lights
- Diocese: Edmonton

Clergy
- Bishop: Stephen London
- Dean: Alexandra Meek

All Saints' Anglican Cathedral is a Canadian cathedral serving the Anglican Diocese of Edmonton, which covers central Alberta. It serves as the episcopal seat of the Bishop of Edmonton.

== History ==
The Anglican Parish of All Saints was founded in 1875 by William Newton, the first known Anglican missionary to the Edmonton area. He arrived in Edmonton on September 28, 1875, having left Ontario in the spring. The parish first met in a log cabin at the corner of what is now Jasper Avenue and 121 Street.

By 1895 the parish had grown considerably and required a new building. A church was constructed on Third Street (now 103 Street) near the present site; however, construction was only half completed due to lack of funds. In 1905 the church went through considerable renovations completing the original building plans. In 1914 the newly installed Bishop of Edmonton, H. A. Gray, named All Saints as the pro-cathedral of the diocese. On December 20, 1919, a fire broke out and destroyed the church, leaving only the outside walls intact. The insurance carried by the church was insufficient to fund the cost of reconstruction. While funds for reconstruction were raised, the church held services in the basement of the Cattistock Block on Jasper Avenue. In 1921, a pro-cathedral was rebuilt on the same site.

The present building was dedicated on May 10, 1956 and was given the permanent status of cathedral. The synod offices of the Edmonton diocese and those of the cathedral are on the second floor, and a seniors' residence, Cathedral Close, adjoins the cathedral via an atrium. The parish hall to the north, which predated the current cathedral, was demolished in 1973.

== Clergy ==
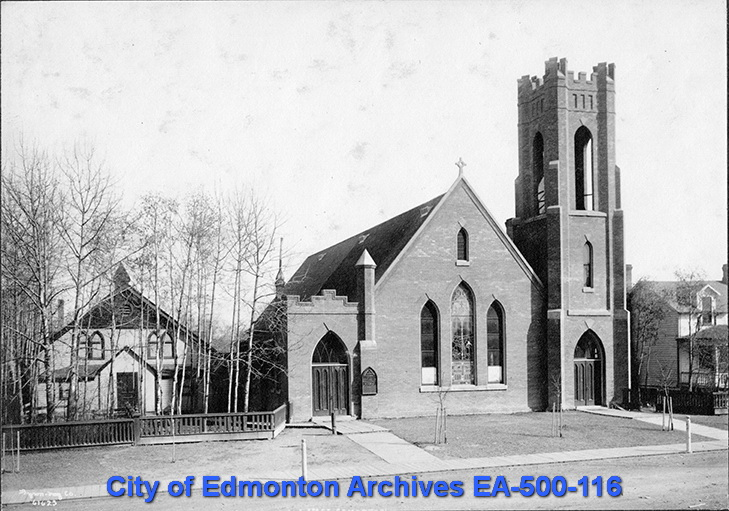
All Saints' Anglican Cathedral (1910)

The cathedral serves as the seat of the Bishop of Edmonton, who as of 2026 is Stephen London.

The present dean is Alex Meek, who was installed on 1 March 2020.

As well, several retired clergy attend All Saints regularly and do not have honorary assistant status. The lay (non-clergy) staff is rounded out with a director of music, and an executive assistant to the dean.

All Saints is host to a congregation of immigrants from South Sudan under Akon Lual Akon and his assistant priest, John Ayuen. The congregation of St. Mark's–Jieng celebrates services in the Dinka language rather than English.

=== Past staff ===
The following is a list of the rectors and deans of All Saints.

Rectors of All Saints

- Charles Cunningham, 1891–1893
- Alfred Studen, 1893–1896
- Henry A. Gray, 1896–1914 (Archdeacon of Edmonton in the Diocese of Calgary. Later elected 1st Bishop of Edmonton.)
- George H. Webb, 1914–1918
- E. Pierce-Goulding, 1918–1937
- T. E. Rowe, 1937–1939
- I. D. Bachelor, 1939-1940 (acting)

Deans of Edmonton and Rectors of All Saints

In 1945 the office of dean was created.

- Alick McDonald Trendell, 1940–1950
- J. Grant Sparling, 1950–1956
- Gerald Burch, 1956–1960 (later elected 5th Bishop of Edmonton 1962)
- Thomas W. Teape, 1960–1965
- Morse Goodman, 1965–1967 (afterwards Bishop of Calgary, 1968)
- Ron Shepherd, ?1968–1969 (afterwards Dean of Montreal, 1969 and then Bishop of British Columbia, 1985)
- Randal E. Ivany, 1970–1974
- James Brown, 1974–1981
- Harry Dawson, 1981–1986
- Harold T. Munn, 1986–1998
- Greg Kerr-Wilson, 1998–2006 (later 11th Bishop of Qu'Appelle and 9th Bishop of Calgary).
- Jane Alexander, 2006–2008 (later 10th Bishop of Edmonton)
- Lee Bezanson, 2008–2010
- Neil Gordon, 2010–2019
- Alexandra Meek 2020–present
