= Robert Park =

Robert or Bob Park may refer to:

- Robert E. Park (1864–1944), American urban sociologist
- Robert H. Park (1902–1994), American electrical engineer and inventor
- Robert L. Park (1931–2020), American physicist
- Robert Park (activist) (born 1981), Korean-American missionary and activist
- Robert Park (American football) (1880–1961), American football coach at Geneva College
- Robert Park (priest) (1885–1971), archdeacon of Winnipeg
- Bob Park (racing driver), American stock car racing driver
- Bob Park (earthquake engineer) (1933–2004), New Zealand earthquake engineer

== See also ==
- Robert Parks (disambiguation)
