= Dean of Calgary =

The Dean of Calgary is an Anglican dean in the Anglican Diocese of Calgary of the Ecclesiastical Province of the Northern Lights, based at Cathedral Church of the Redeemer, Calgary.

Incumbents have been :

| Tenure | Incumbent | Notes | Ref |
|---|---|---|---|
| 1902–1927 | Edward Clarence Paget | (1851–1927) |
| 1933–1943 | Harry Richard Ragg | (1889–1957) (3rd Dean) Bishop of Calgary 1943–52 |
| 1948–1951 | George Boyd Snell | (1907–2006) Bishop of Toronto 1966–72 |
| 1951–1953 | James H. Craig |
| 1953–1958 | William Edward Harrison |
| 1965–1969 | Hugh Vernon Stiff | (1916–1995) Bishop of Keewatin 1969–74 |
| 1969–1979 | David John Carter | (1934–) |
| 1980–1986 | John Blyth |
| 1987–1991 | Fabian W. Hugh | (Resigned) |
| 1991–2001 | Robert Pynn |
| c.2006– | Tony Andrews |
| 2015–2021 | Leighton Lee |
| 2022–present | Chris Dowdeswell |
