= Diocese of Athabasca =

Diocese of the Anglican Church in Canada

Coordinates: 56.235°N 117.295°W

Location
- Country: Canada
- Ecclesiastical province: Northern Lights
- Deaneries: Athabasca; Peace River

Statistics
- Parishes: 17 (2022)
- Members: 896 (2022)

Information
- Denomination: Anglican Church of Canada
- Rite: Anglican
- Cathedral: St. James' Cathedral, Peace River

Current leadership
- Bishop: David Greenwood

Map
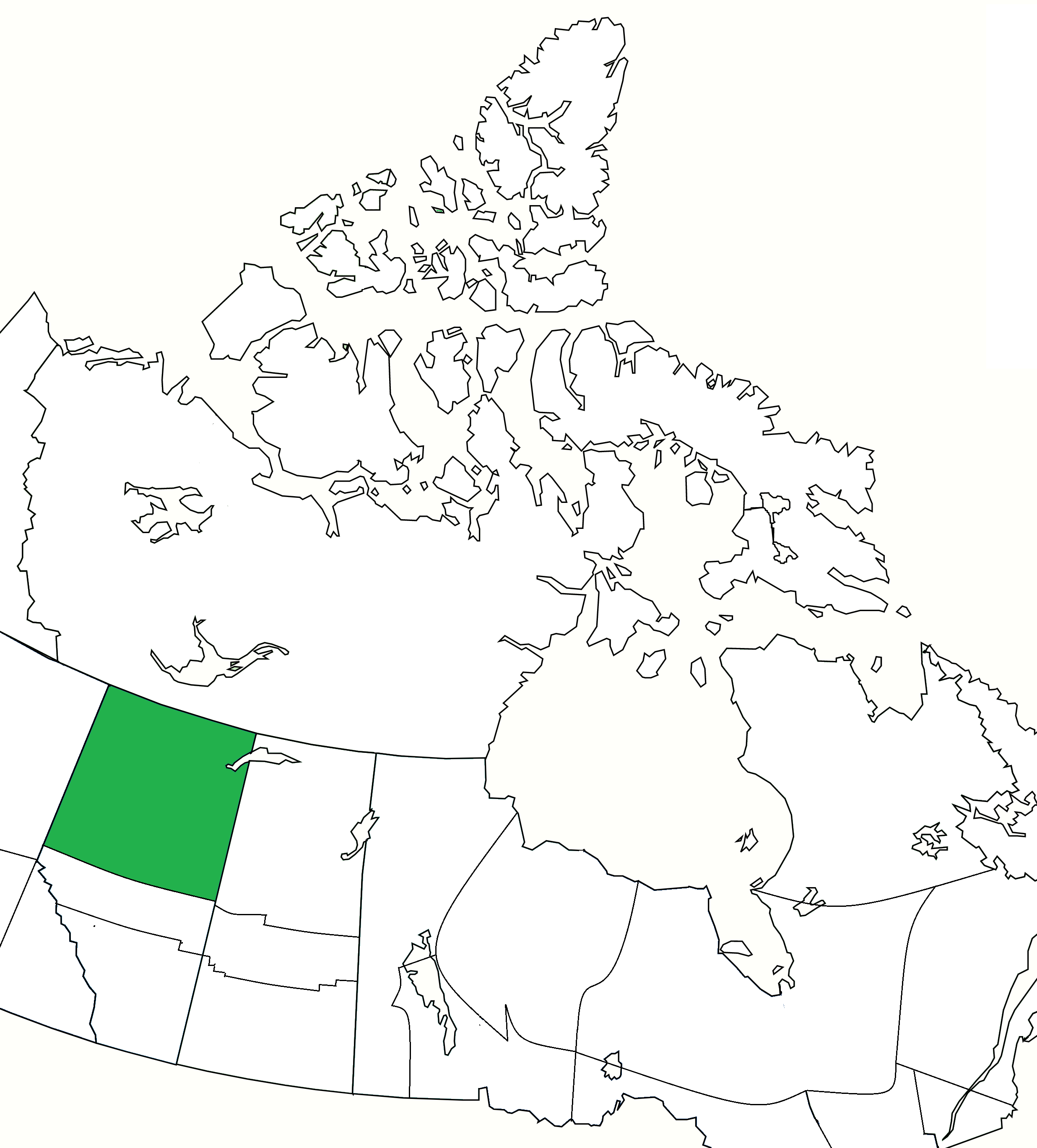
- Boundaries of the diocese within the Province of the Northern Lights

Website
- athdio.ca

The Anglican Diocese of Athabasca is a diocese of the Northern Lights of the Anglican Church of Canada, in the northern half of the civil province of Alberta. It was created in 1874 by the division into four parts of the original Diocese of Rupert's Land. The Synod of the Diocese of Athabasca was organized in 1876. The diocese was then itself subdivided in 1892 to create the new dioceses of Selkirk (later renamed Yukon) and Mackenzie River and in 1933 to create the Diocese of The Arctic (which subsumed Mackenzie River).

The see city is Peace River. The diocese has had at least two other See Cities: Fort Simpson and Fort Vermilion. The bishop resided for a considerable period at Athabasca Landing, but it is not certain whether it was ever his "seat". Other cities in the diocese are Grande Prairie and Fort McMurray.

The diocesan bishop is David Greenwood, a priest in the diocese since 2015, who was elected 12th Bishop of Athabasca by the Diocesan Synod on 16 November 2019 in St James' Cathedral, Peace River.

No.	Image	Name	Dates	Notes
1		William Bompas	1874–1883	
2		Richard Young	1873–1903	
3		George Holmes	1908 (Acting); 1909–1912	
4		Edwin Robins	1912–1930	
5		Robert Renison	1932	
6		Arthur Sovereign	1932–1950	
7		Reginald Pierce	1950–1974	
8		Frederick Crabb	1975–1983	
9		Gary Woolsey	1983–1991	
10		John Clarke	1992–2009	Metropolitan of Rupert's Land, 2003–2008
11		Fraser Lawton	2009–2019	
12		David Greenwood	2019–	

== Deans of Athabasca ==
The Dean of Athabasca is also Rector of St James Cathedral.

- 1949–?: Roland Hill (1st Dean)
- c. 1952: Edwin Thain

? –? Dean Roy Crisfield

? – ? Dean David Ellis

- ?–1979: James Hoskin
- 1979–1987: Fabian Hugh (afterwards Dean of Calgary, 1987) named Dean emeritus of Athabasca
- 1993–1998: Roland Wood (previously Bishop of Saskatoon, 1981–1993)
- 1998–2005: Michael Rolf
- 2006–2016: Iain Luke, later Principal of the College of Emmanuel and St. Chad, Saskatoon, SK.
- 2017–2023: Jason Haggstrom (previously Dean of Caledonia, 2011–2017)
