= Clarendon Worrell =

Canadian primate and educator

The Most Reverend Clarendon Lamb Worrell
- Primate of the Anglican Church of Canada
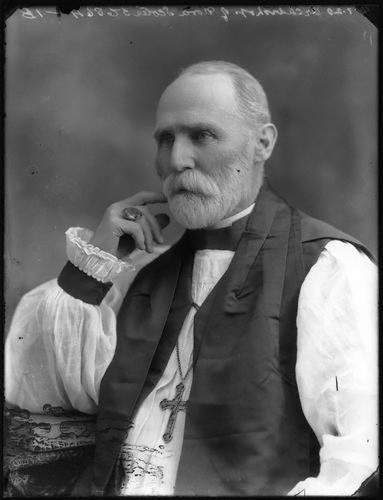
- In office: 1932 to 1934

Personal details
- Born: July 20, 1854 Smith's Falls, Ontario
- Died: August 10, 1934 (aged 80)
- Occupation: educator, Primate

Clarendon Lamb Worrell (July 20, 1854 – 10 August 1934) was the 5th Primate of the Anglican Church of Canada.

== Early life ==
Clarendon Lamb Worrell was born on July 20, 1854, at Smith's Falls, Ontario, to the Reverend Canon John Worrell and Elizabeth Lamb. His early education was received from local Smith's Falls schools until the age of 17, when he entered the newly relocated Trinity College School at Port Hope. In the six months he was there, Worrell became a very accomplished student, achieving the distinction of head boy. In June 1873 he graduated from the University of Trinity College with honours, bringing with him a host of awards and scholarships he had achieved at Trinity College, especially in the field of mathematics. That September, Worrell joined Bishop's College School as the mathematics master, leaving there in 1875 to take up a position at Hellmuth College, London, under headmaster Arthur Sweatman, who, along with Worrell, would also become Primate of the Anglican Church of Canada. The next year, Worrell left Hellmuth to join a school in Hamilton, Ontario. After the position in Hamilton, Worrell taught at Cobourg, Ontario, before returning to Trinity College to enter the Divinity School in 1878.

== Ministry ==
In 1881, Worrell was ordained deacon by the Bishop of Ontario and was appointed curate of Christ Church, Gananoque, serving there until 1882 when he became curate of a church in Brockville. During his time at Brockville, he also served as the headmaster of the Brockville Collegiate Institute from 1882 to 1884. In 1884, he was ordained priest by the Bishop of Ontario and appointed rector of Williamsburg. Two years later, he left that position to become rector of a church in Morrisburg. In 1891, he became rector of a church in Kingston, Ontario, whilst also serving as professor of English literature at the Royal Military College of Canada from 1891 to 1904. In 1901, he was appointed the Archdeacon of Ontario. Two years later, he became rector of St. Mark's Barriefield in Kingston, from 1891 to 1903, before being elected as Bishop of Nova Scotia in October 1904 to 1915, when he became the Metropolitan of Canada.

On February 10, 1915, Worrell was elected Metropolitan of Canada. As such he was a sitter in three portraits by Bassano at the National Portrait Gallery, London. Four years later, he was elected the Bishop of Bermuda. Although he did not accept the offer from Bermuda, Worrell did agree to give Bermuda episcopal oversight for a short while and even made two visits there. In September 1931, after the resignation of the previous Primate of the Anglican Church of Canada, Worrell was unanimously elected to that position. On August 10, 1934, Worrell died after four weeks suffering from illness.

== Personal life ==
Worrell was a Freemason and a keen gardener.

== Family ==
His brother, J.A. Worrell, was a prominent member of the Conservative Party.

== See also ==
- List of Bishop's College School alumni

Anglican Communion titles
Preceded by Samuel Pritchard Matheson	Primate of the Anglican Church of Canada; 1932–1934	Succeeded by Derwyn Trevor Owen
