= Bishop Burch =

Bishop Burch may refer to:

- Charles Sumner Burch (1854–1920), Episcopal bishop of New York
- William Gerald Burch (1911-2003), Canadian Anglican bishop
