= Helen Kennedy (bishop) =

English-born Canadian bishop

The Right Reverend Helen Kennedy
- Bishop of Qu'Appelle
- Church: Anglican Church of Canada
- Province: Northern Lights
- Diocese: Qu'Appelle
- See: Regina, Saskatchewan
- Elected: 2021
- Predecessor: Robert Hardwick

Orders
- Ordination: 2007
- Consecration: January 22, 2022

Personal details
- Born: 1968 (age 57–58) Nuneaton, England, United Kingdom
- Denomination: Anglican
- Education: Canadian Mennonite University (MA); University of Winnipeg (BA)

Helen Jane Kennedy (born 1968) is a bishop of the Anglican Church of Canada. She is the current bishop of the Diocese of Qu'Appelle in southern Saskatchewan.

== Biography ==
Kennedy was born in 1968 in Nuneaton, Warwickshire, England. She worked as an ambulance driver and first responder in England, before immigrating to Canada in 1999. From 2000 to 2001, she was a Winnipeg-based field staff for Youth for Christ. From 2001 to 2005, she was Youth for Christ's ministry director in Selkirk, Manitoba.

=== Ordained ministry ===
Kennedy studied at the University of Winnipeg, graduating with a Bachelor of Theology (BTh) degree in 2007. She was ordained in the Anglican Church of Canada as a deacon in 2007 for the Diocese of Rupert's Land and as a priest in 2008. After ordination, she served as a part-time diocesan youth minister and part-time in the parish of St George's Anglican Church, Transcona, Winnipeg. She became the full-time rector of St George's Anglican Church in 2010.

After the retirement of Robert Hardwick as Bishop of Qu'Appelle, Kennedy was elected bishop at the diocesan synod on 17 October 2021. She was consecrated a bishop on 22 January 2022 during a service at St. Paul's Cathedral, Regina, Saskatchewan. The principal consecrator was Archbishop Greg Kerr-Wilson, Metropolitan of Rupert's Land.

She would vote to amend the Anglican marriage canon to support same sex marriage.
