= Derwyn Randulph Grier Owen =

Canadian theologian and academic (1914–1997)

The Reverend Dr Derwyn Randulph Grier Owen (1914-1997) was a Canadian Anglican priest and academic. He was the Provost of Trinity College, Toronto from 1957 to 1972. He was the son of Derwyn Owen, the Anglican Archbishop of Toronto and Primate of All Canada. He received his secondary education at Ridley College and then proceeded to Trinity College, Toronto, Corpus Christi, Oxford, the Union Theological Seminary in New York (where he studied with both Reinhold Niebuhr and Paul Tillich), and the University of Toronto. He performed military service during WWII and then spent the remainder of his life in Toronto, where he held a number of academic and administrative positions, most importantly as a Professor of Religious Studies and as the Provost of Trinity. Among his books are Scientism, Man, and Religion, Body and Soul. and Social Thought and Anglican Theology.

== See also ==
- Trinity College, Toronto
