= George Calvert (bishop) =

Canadian Anglican bishop (1900–1976)

George Reginald Calvert (11 October 1900 – 18 March 1976) was the fourth Bishop of Calgary in the Anglican Church of Canada.

Calvert was educated at the University of Toronto and ordained in 1925. He was the incumbent of Snowflake, Manitoba and then Rector of Holland, Killarney and West Kildonan before becoming Archdeacon of Winnipeg. From 1949 to 1952 he was Rector of Christ Church Cathedral, Victoria, British Columbia and Dean of Columbia before being ordained to the episcopate. He was a Grand Master of the Grand Lodge, Manitoba (Ancient Free and Accepted Masons). He retired in 1967 and died in 1976.

Anglican Communion titles
Preceded by Daniel Parker	Archdeacon of Winnipeg; 1945–1949	Succeeded by Robert Park
Preceded by Spenser Elliot	Dean of Columbia; 1949–1952	Succeeded by Philip Beattie
Preceded by Harry Richard Ragg	Bishop of Calgary; 1952–1967	Succeeded by Morse Lamb Goodman
