= John Langstone =

Canadian Anglican bishop

John Arthur William Langstone (August 30, 1913 – February 26, 1994) was a Canadian Anglican bishop in the second half of the 20th century.

Born in Winnipeg, Manitoba on August 30, 1913 he was educated at the University of Toronto and ordained in 1938. He was a curate at St John Baptist, Toronto and then a chaplain in the Canadian Army He held incumbencies at Port Credit, Ontario, St George's, Edmonton and St Faith's, in the same city. He was a canon at All Saints Cathedral, Edmonton from 1963 and Archdeacon of Edmonton until his elevation to the episcopate as its diocesan bishop in 1976. He retired in 1979 and died on February 26, 1994.

== Notes ==
Religious titles
| Preceded by William Gerald Burch | Bishop of Edmonton, Canada; 1976– 1979 | Succeeded by Edwin Kent Clarke |
