= Kent Clarke =

Canadian Anglican bishop

The Rt Revd Kent Clarke
- Church: Anglican

Personal details
- Born: 21 January 1932
- Died: 25 October 2016 (aged 84)

Edwin Kent Clarke (21 January 1932 – 25 October 2016) was a Canadian Anglican bishop.

Clarke was educated at Bishop's University and ordained in 1957. He was a curate of All Saints' Westboro until 1956 when he became Director of Christian Education for the Diocese of Ottawa, a position he held until 1966. He was rector of St Lambert, Montreal from then until 1973 when he became diocesan secretary of the Diocese of Niagara and Archdeacon of Niagara. He was Bishop Suffragan of Niagara from 1976 to 1979 and Bishop of Edmonton from 1980 to 1986. He became Archbishop of Edmonton and Metropolitan of Rupert's Land in that year but resigned a year later.

Anglican Communion titles
Preceded by John Langstone	Bishop of Edmonton, Canada; 1980–1987	Succeeded by Ken Genge
Preceded by Michael Peers	Metropolitan of Rupert's Land; 1986–1987	Succeeded by Walter H. Jones
