= Harry Ragg =

Canadian Anglican bishop

Harry Richard Ragg (6 January 1889 - 15 August 1967) was the Anglican Bishop of Calgary in the mid 20th century.

Ragg was born and educated at Hereford Cathedral School and St John's College, Cambridge, where he ran in the 100 meters race against Oxford for three years in succession. He was ordained in 1912. His first ministry position was as a curate at St Paul's Southport. Emigrating to Canada, he held incumbencies at Fruitvale, Trail and Chilliwack. From 1925 to 1930 he was the rector of All Saints' Winnipeg and then the Dean of Calgary until his ordination to the episcopate in 1943.

Ragg's son, Theodore David Butler Ragg, was the Bishop of Huron from 1974 to 1984.

Religious titles
Preceded by Louis Ralph Sherman	Bishop of Calgary; 1943–1952	Succeeded by George Reginald Calvert
