= Gary Woolsey =

Canadian Anglican bisjop (1942–2013)

Gary Frederick Woolsey (1942–2013) was an Anglican bishop in Canada whose ministry focused on serving the spiritual needs of First Nation people in central Canada.

Woolsey was born on 16 March 1942 to Bill and Dorene Woolsey in Brantford, Ontario. In 1967 he began his ministry as a priest-pilot in the Diocese of Keewatin. Later he held incumbencies at Big Trout Lake, Norway House and Churchill. From 1980 to 1983 he was Archdeacon of Keewatin when he was ordained to the episcopate as the 9th Bishop of Athabasca, a post he held until 1991.

In retirement Woolsey was an honorary assistant bishop in Calgary.

Woolsey died October 18, 2013, in Calgary.

== Personal life ==
Woolsey married Marie Tooker in 1977. They had four children.

Anglican Communion titles
Preceded by Frederick Crabb	Bishop of Athabasca; 1983–1991	Succeeded by John Clarke
