= Frederick Crabb =

Anglican bishop (1915–2007)

Frederick Hugh Wright Crabb (24 April 1915 - 24 February 2007) was an Anglican bishop and missionary in the 20th century.

He was born in Luppitt, Devon, on 24 April 1915, as the third of six children in a farming family. He studied Theology at the University of London and was ordained in 1939. His first posts were curacies in Teignmouth and Plymouth.

In 1942, the Church Missionary Society send him to Sudan as a missionary until 1951. He worked with the Dinka people, and in Yei and Mundri, where he founded the Bishop Gwynne Theological College. He married Margery Coombs in 1946 and they had three children, John, Alison and Elizabeth. The family returned to England in 1951 for health reasons.

He was Vice Principal of the London College of Divinity from 1951 until 1957 and then Principal of the College of Emmanuel and St Chad, Saskatoon for a further 10 years. He then held two incumbencies in Calgary before being appointed Bishop of Athabasca in 1975. He was also Metropolitan of Rupert's Land from 1977 and retired in 1983.

Crabb died on 24 February 2007.

Anglican Communion titles
Preceded by Reginald Pierce	Bishop of Athabasca; 1975–1982	Succeeded by Gary Woolsey
Preceded by Fredric Jackson	Metropolitan of Rupert's Land; 1977–1982	Succeeded by Michael Peers
