= Fraser Lawton =

Anglican bishop

Fraser Lawton is currently Rector, The Church of St. Dunstan (Episcopal), and Assisting Bishop, Diocese of Dallas. Formerly, he was the 11th the Anglican Bishop of Athabasca from 2009-2019, and before that, rector of St Thomas' Anglican Church in Fort McMurray, Alberta.

Anglican Communion titles
| Preceded by John Clarke | Bishop of Athabasca; 2010–2019 | Succeeded by David Greenwood |
