= Henry Gray (bishop) =

Canadian Anglican bishop (1873–1939)

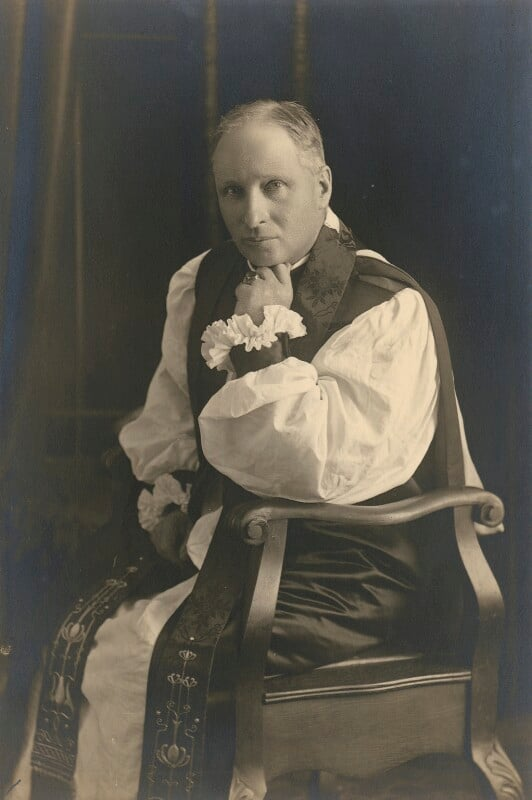
Gray, c. 1910s

Henry Allen Gray (13 July 1873 – 12 December 1939) was a Canadian Anglican bishop.

Gray was born in Kilburn, London and was educated at Chatham House Grammar School and the University of Manitoba. He was ordained in 1895 and was a curate at South Edmonton from 1895 to 1896 and its incumbent until 1897. He then became Rector of Edmonton from 1897 to 1914 the Archdeacon of Edmonton from 1907. In 1914 he became the first Bishop of Edmonton, serving until 1931.

Gray died in Bungay in 1939.

Religious titles
Preceded by Inaugural appointment	Bishop of Edmonton, Canada; 1914 – 1931	Succeeded by Arthur Edward Burgett
