= Barry Curtis (bishop) =

Canadian Anglican bishop

John Barry Curtis is a retired Anglican bishop in Canada.

Born on 19 June 1933, he was educated at Trinity College, Toronto and ordained after a period of study at Chichester Theological College in 1959. He began his ordained ministry as a curate in Pembroke, Ontario. After this he held incumbencies in Kanata, Ontario, Buckingham, Quebec, Westboro, Ottawa and Elbow Park, Calgary. He became Bishop of Calgary and Metropolitan of Rupert's Land in 1994, retiring from both posts in 1999.

Religious titles
Preceded by Morse Goodman	Bishop of Calgary; 1983–1999	Succeeded by Barry Hollowell
Preceded by Walter H. Jones	Metropolitan of Rupert's Land; 1994–1999	Succeeded by Tom Morgan
