= Genge (surname) =

Genge is an English surname. Notable people with the surname include:

- Colin Genge (1859–1910), Canadian politician and contractor
- Ellis Genge (born 1995), English rugby union player
- Ken Genge (Kenneth Lyte Genge) (born 1933), former Canadian Anglican bishop
- Paul Genge (1913–1988), American actor
- Stewart Genge, member of the National Australia men's national pitch and putt team in the World Cup 2008
- William Genge, Abbot of Peterborough 1397-1408
