= James Brown (dean of Edmonton) =

James Russell Brown was Dean of Edmonton from 1974 to 1981.

He was educated at the University of Saskatchewan and was ordained Deacon in 1959; and Priest in 1960. After a curacies in Edmonton he was Rector at Drayton Valley. He was Rector of Winnipeg from 1966 to 1974.
