= Ted Scott (bishop) =

Canadian bishop (1919–2004)

The Most Reverend Ted Scott
- Primate of the Anglican Church of Canada
- Church: Anglican Church of Canada
- See: Extra-diocesan
- In office: 1971–1986
- Predecessor: Howard Clark
- Successor: Michael Peers
- Previous post: Bishop of Kootenay

Orders
- Ordination: 1941
- Consecration: 1966

Personal details
- Born: April 30, 1919 Edmonton, Alberta, Canada
- Died: June 21, 2004 (aged 85) Parry Sound, Ontario, Canada

Edward Walter Scott CC (April 30, 1919 – June 21, 2004) was a Canadian Anglican bishop.

Scott was born in Edmonton, Alberta in 1919 and grew up in Vancouver, British Columbia, where his father was a rector. He attended Anglican Theological College and was ordained in 1941. He became Bishop of Kootenay in 1966.

Scott served as primate of the Anglican Church of Canada from 1971 to 1986 and was also moderator of the Central Committee of the World Council of Churches from 1975 to 1983. He was considered a liberal in the church and was an advocate of reforms such as the ordination of women. In the late 1980s Scott served on the Commonwealth of Nations "Eminent Persons Group" that recommended the implementation of sanctions against South Africa.

Scott was awarded the Pearson Peace Medal in 1988 and was made a Companion of the Order of Canada in 1978.

Scott died in a car accident near Parry Sound, Ontario in 2004.

== Sources ==
- Radical Compassion: The Life and Times of Archbishop Edward Scott by Hugh McCullum (ISBN 1-55126-414-5)

Anglican Communion titles
Preceded by Howard Clark	Primate of the Anglican Church of Canada; 1971–1986	Succeeded by Michael Peers
