= Morse Goodman =

Canadian Anglican bishop

Morse Lamb Goodman (27 May 1917 – 12 December 1993) was the fifth Bishop of Calgary.

Goodman was born in Rosedale, Ontario and educated at the University of Toronto. He was ordained in 1943. and was a curate at St Paul's Fort William and then held incumbencies in Murillo and Winnipeg. He was Dean of Brandon (1960–65) and then Edmonton (1965–67) before his ordination to the episcopate in 1968. He retired in 1983 and died a decade later.

Religious titles
| Preceded by George Reginald Calvert | Bishop of Calgary; 1968–1983 | Succeeded by John Barry Curtis |
