= Robert Parks =

Robert Parks may refer to:

- W. Robert Parks (1915–2003), American academic, President of Iowa State University
- Bobby Parks (cricketer) (born 1959), English cricketer
- Robert J. Parks (1922–2011), US aerospace engineer and manager at the Jet Propulsion Laboratory

== See also ==
- Robert Park (disambiguation)
