= The April Maze =

Australian musical group

- Origin: Melbourne, Australia
- Genre: Alternative folk
- Years active: 2008-present
- Label: Independent
- Members: Todd Mayhew and Sivan Agam
- Website: www.theaprilmaze.com

The April Maze are a British/Australian alternative folk duo consisting of Todd Mayhew (vocals, guitar, banjo) and Sivan Agam (vocals, cello, guitar). They issued their first release in 2008 and have toured Australia, New Zealand, UK, Germany and Canada.

== Background ==
Sivan Agam grew up in Harrow, England and studied Art and Theatre. Todd Mayhew was raised in Cairns, Queensland, Australia, and is the Great Grandson of Isaac O Stringer (The Bishop Who Ate His Boots). Sivan and Todd met in shared accommodation in 2006 in Coburg (Melbourne) and began to connect musically. The two were married in October 2011 and had 'the words from one of our songs, Two Dogs, includes our wedding vows'. In November 2012, their album ‘TWO’ was listed in Spotify’s Top 100 most popular new releases after receiving more than 70,000 plays in its first week. They have released three singles, one EP, and three albums. The band raised $20,395 to produce their album Sleeping Storm using the Pozible crowd funding platform, which was released in 2015.

== Discography ==
April Maze (EP) (2008)

One For the Hills (2009) (Not available)

Recycled Soul (2010)

Two (2012)

The April Maze - UK/Europe Release (2013)

Don't Let The Bastards Bring You Down (Single) (2013)

I've Seen The Rain (Single) (2013)

"It's Been a Long Time Between Beers (Single)" (2014)

"Sleeping Storm (Album)" (2015)
