= Cathedral Church of the Redeemer =

Cathedral and Metropolitical Church of the Redeemer
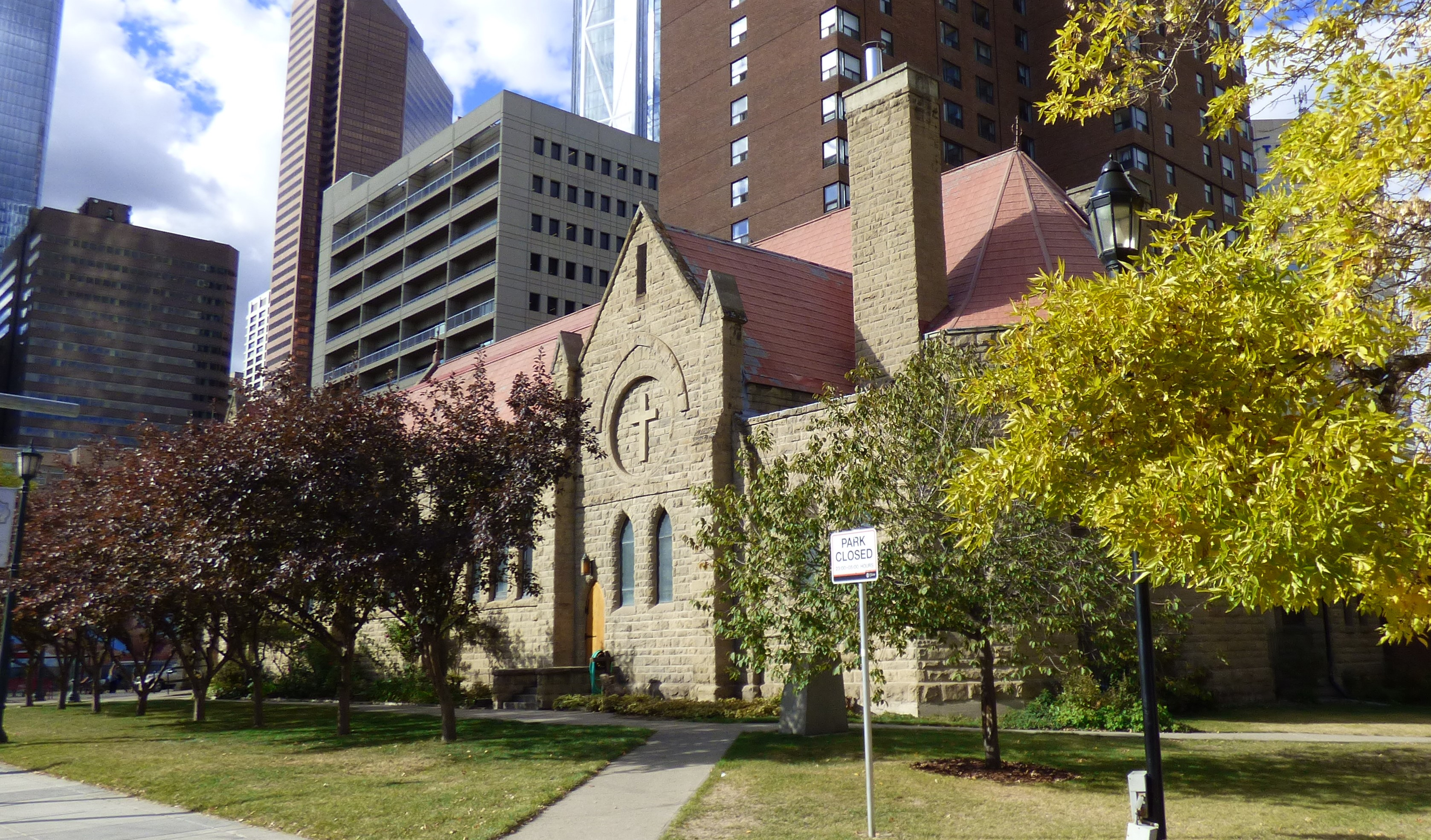
- Southeast view of the cathedral
- Cathedral and Metropolitical Church of the Redeemer
- Location: 604 1st Street SE; Calgary, Alberta; T2G 5H8
- Denomination: Anglican
- Website: Cathedral Church of the Redeemer

History
- Status: Cathedral
- Founded: 1884
- Dedication: 1905
- Dedicated: September 8, 1904
- Consecrated: July 30, 1905

Architecture
- Functional status: Active
- Architectural type: Norman-Gothic

Specifications
- Length: 145 ft (44 m)
- Width: 70 ft (21 m)
- Height: 45 ft (14 m)
- Materials: sandstone

Administration
- Diocese: Anglican Diocese of Calgary

The Cathedral and Metropolitical Church of the Redeemer is located in the downtown core of Calgary, Alberta, Canada. It is the seat of the Archbishop of the Anglican Diocese of Calgary.

== History ==
The original Church of the Redeemer, a wood-frame building erected just east of the present site, was completed and opened for worship August 3, 1884. It was the first Anglican church to be constructed in what is now the Diocese of Calgary. Originally intended to serve as a parish church, it was proclaimed the temporary pro-cathedral on February 14, 1889, following the creation of the Diocese of Calgary and pending the assumed ultimate construction of a cathedral.

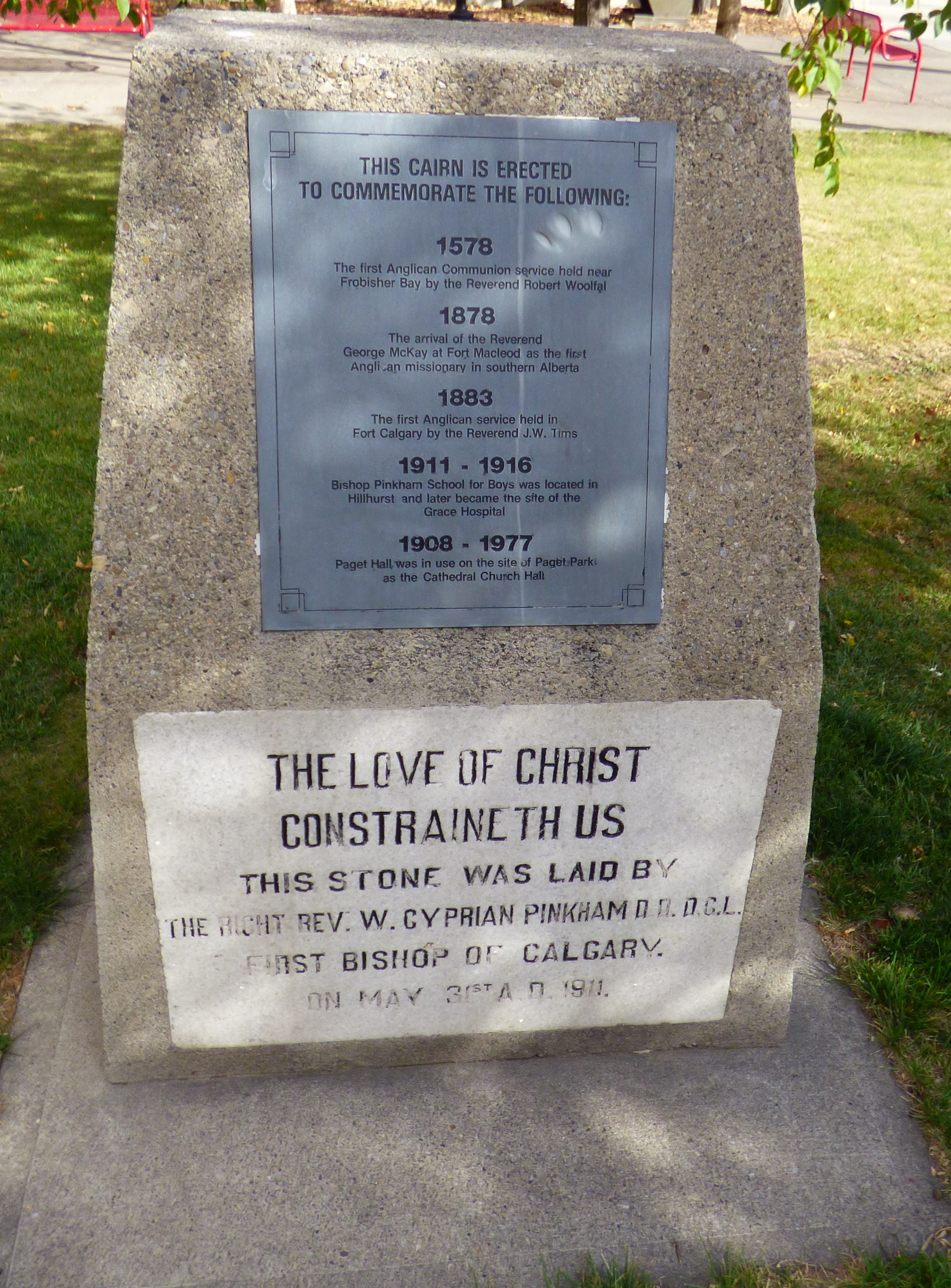
A cornerstone at the church marks historical events for the communion in Calgary

The parish replaced the frame church with a more elaborate structure in 1905, during Calgary's famous sandstone era. It is of local, rough cut Paskapoo sandstone, and has one of the oldest tin roofs in Calgary. It was designed by J. C. M. Keith of Victoria, British Columbia. The original cornerstone (since replaced by a new cornerstone, laid to mark the centennial of the building) stated that it was laid by the Earl of Minto, Governor General of Canada, on September 8, 1904. It was completed and opened for services on July 30, 1905. It was designated a full cathedral in June 1949, when it was obvious that a large edifice of British or European proportions would not be built in Calgary. In September 1974, the cathedral building was designated a Registered Heritage Site, under provisions of the Alberta Heritage Act, 1973.

In December 2004, Barry Hollowell, seventh Bishop of Calgary, made the very controversial proposal to dismiss the Cathedral Church of the Redeemer and appoint another church as the diocesan seat. This controversy, in addition to the controversial closures of three parish churches within the Diocese of Calgary (one of which was reversed), led to the resignation of the bishop. Derek Hoskin, eighth Bishop of Calgary, was consecrated and enthroned in the Cathedral Church of the Redeemer on September 29, 2006.

== Architecture ==
The cathedral measures 145 feet long and 70 feet wide. The height from the floor of the nave to the pine ceiling is 45 feet. In 1936, the Lady Chapel, the gift of Henry and Eleanor Tomkins, was constructed. In its tower hangs a bell, which had originally hung in the tower of the first wooden church on the site. The bell was donated as a remembrance to Corporal Lowry of the North-West Mounted Police who died during the Riel Rebellion of 1885.

== See also ==
- Dean of Calgary
- List of cathedrals in Canada
