= Louis Sherman (bishop) =

Canadian Anglican bishop

Orders
- Consecration: 24 Feb 1927 by Samuel Matheson

Louis Ralph Sherman was an Anglican bishop in Canada in the 20th century.

Born on 22 August 1886 in Fredericton, New Brunswick, he was educated at Christ Church, Oxford, and ordained after a period of study at Ripon College Cuddesdon in 1912. He began his ordained ministry as a curate at the Christ Church Mission, Poplar. Returning to Canada he held a similar post at Trinity Church, Saint John, New Brunswick. He was the priest in charge and then the rector of the Church of the Holy Trinity, Toronto, and rector of Holy Trinity Cathedral, Quebec, and dean of Quebec from 1925 to 1927, before being consecrated Bishop of Calgary. In 1943 he also became Archbishop and Metropolitan of Rupert's Land, dying in post on 31 July 1953.

Anglican Communion titles
Preceded by Cyprian Pinkham	Bishop of Calgary; 1927–1953	Succeeded by Harry Ragg
Preceded by Malcolm Harding	Metropolitan of Rupert's Land; 1943–1953	Succeeded by Walter Barfoot
