= Reginald Pierce =

Canadian Anglican bishop (1909–1992)

Reginald James Pierce (1909 – 11 January 1992) was a Canadian Anglican bishop.

== Biography ==
He was born in 1909, educated at the University of Saskatchewan and ordained Deacon in 1932. In 1934, he was ordained Priest and became Priest in charge of Colinton, Alberta. After this he was Rural Dean of Grande Prairie and then Rector of South Saanich. Further incumbencies followed in Calgary and Winnipeg before his ordination in 1950 to the episcopate as the 7th Bishop of Athabasca. He retired in 1974 and died on 11 January 1992.

Anglican Communion titles
Preceded by Arthur Sovereign	Bishop of Athabasca; 1950–1974	Succeeded by Frederick Crabb
