= Derwyn Owen =

Canadian Anglican bishop

The Most Reverend Derwyn Trevor Owen (29 July 1876— 9 April 1947) was the sixth Primate of the Anglican Church of Canada and the fifth Bishop of Niagara then Toronto.

== Early life and career ==
Educated at Trinity College, Toronto, he was ordained in 1901. He held curacies at St John's Church, Toronto and then St James’ Cathedral in the same city. He was rector of Holy Trinity Church, Toronto from 1908 to 1914 and then the Dean of Niagara until his ordination to the episcopate.

== Episcopate ==
Owen was consecrated as Bishop on 24 June 1925 and enthroned as Bishop of Niagara. He was translated in 1932 to be the Bishop of Toronto. In 1934 he was elected Primate of All Canada, and thereafter styled Archbishop of Toronto and Primate of All Canada (although he was not the Metropolitan of the Province of Ontario, of which the Diocese of Toronto is a part).

== Private life ==
Owen was a Freemason, and a member of Ionic Lodge No 25, Toronto. He married Nora Grier Jellett. His son, Derwyn R.G. Owen, became Provost of Trinity College, Toronto, his father's old college. An oral history interview of Derwyn R.G. Owen, which includes an account of his family history, can be found at the University of Toronto Archives and Records Management Services. His other son, Captain David Derwyn Owen, was born on June 4, 1916 in Hamilton, Ontario. He was a member of Queen's Own Rifles of Canada, R.C.I.C. He obtained a B.A from University of Toronto and was enrolled at Harvard University at the time of his death.
