= David Ashdown =

Canadian bishop (1950–2021)

David Norman Ashdown (1950 – June 9, 2021) was the 9th Bishop of Keewatin in the Anglican Church of Canada and the 16th Metropolitan of Rupert's Land. He served as mayor of the town of Craik, Saskatchewan, until June 2020.

Anglican Communion titles
| Preceded by Gordon Beardy | Bishop of Keewatin; 2001–2014 | Diocese abolished |
| Preceded by John Clarke | Metropolitan of Rupert's Land; 2009–2014 | Succeeded by Greg Kerr-Wilson |
