= Victoria Matthews =

Canadian Anglican bishop (born 1954)

The Right Reverend Victoria Matthews
- Bishop of Christchurch
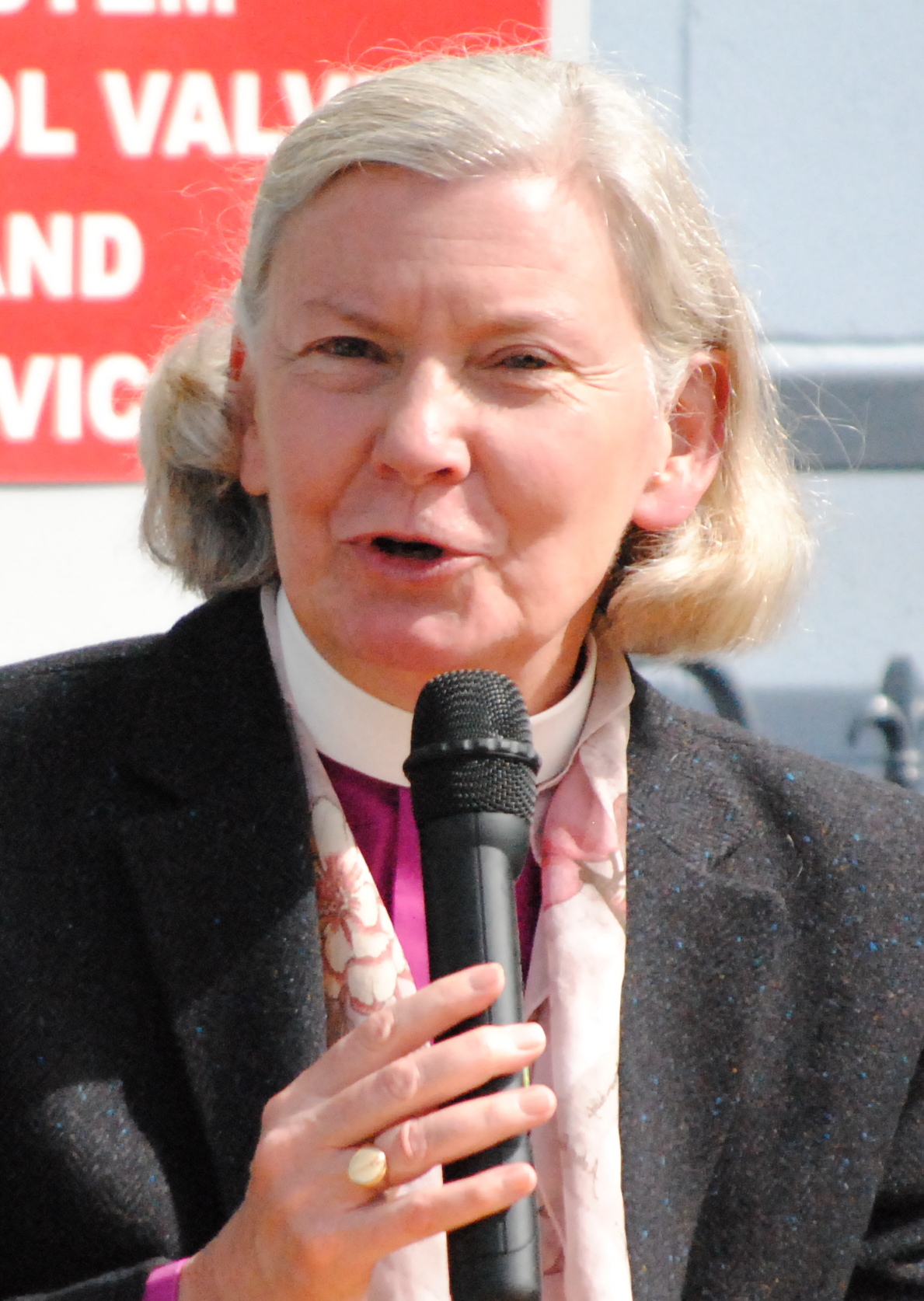
- Matthews in 2012
- Church: Anglican Church in Aotearoa, New Zealand and Polynesia
- In office: 2008–2018
- Predecessor: David Coles
- Successor: Peter Carrell
- Other post: Bishop of Edmonton (1997–2007)

Orders
- Ordination: 1979 (deacon); 1980 (priest)
- Consecration: 12 February 1994 by Percy O'Driscoll

Personal details
- Born: 1954 (age 71–72) Toronto, Ontario, Canada
- Education: University of Toronto; Yale University

Victoria Matthews (born 1954) is a Canadian Anglican bishop. From 2008 until 2018, she served as Bishop of Christchurch in the Anglican Church in Aotearoa, New Zealand and Polynesia. In 1994, she became the first woman ordained bishop in the Anglican Church of Canada when she was made a suffragan bishop of the Diocese of Toronto. She then served as the Bishop of Edmonton from 1997 to 2007.

== Education ==
Matthews was educated at Bishop Strachan School in Toronto, and graduated with a Bachelor of Arts degree with honours from Trinity College, University of Toronto, in 1976. She was the recipient of the North American Theological Fellowship from 1976 to 1979, and completed a Master of Divinity degree at Yale Divinity School and Berkeley Divinity School. She also holds a Master of Theology degree from Trinity College, Toronto, which she completed in 1987. She was awarded an honorary doctorate from Yale Divinity School in 2017.

== Ordained ministry ==
Matthews upholds a generous orthodoxy (calling for a radical, Christ-centered orthodoxy expressed as missional faith and practice) and is on the Anglo-Catholic wing of the church.

Matthews became a deacon in 1979 and was ordained to the priesthood in 1980. She served as an educator and a parish priest until 12 February 1994 when she was ordained to the episcopate. Matthews began chairing the Primate's Theological Commission in 1996 and was re-elected in 2004. She also chaired the Task Force on Alternate Episcopal Oversight.

=== Episcopal ministry ===
From 1994 to 1997 she was Suffragan (Assistant) Bishop of Toronto, for the Credit Valley area. She became the first woman to be a bishop in the Anglican Church of Canada.

She was elected Bishop of Edmonton in 1997, and held the position until her resignation in 2007. In 2004, she was a nominee for the posts of Bishop of Toronto and Primate of the Anglican Church of Canada but had to withdraw from both slates in order to undergo treatment for breast cancer.

She was bishop-in-residence at Wycliffe College, Toronto, from January to April 2008. In February 2008, she was elected Bishop of Christchurch in the Anglican Church in Aotearoa, New Zealand and Polynesia, and she was enthroned on 30 August 2008.

During her time as the Bishop of Christchurch, there were over 12,000 earthquakes and aftershocks in the city and surrounding area. The Diocese had 220 buildings badly damaged or destroyed including the iconic ChristChurch Cathedral which is central to the history of the city and province. Recognising the length of time before a new Cathedral in Cathedral Square would be built, the Transitional Cathedral, also known as the 'Cardboard Cathedral,' was erected.

In March 2018 she announced her resignation as diocesan bishop effective 1 May 2018. She was a nominee in the election of coadjutor bishop of Toronto. The election was held on 9 June 2018. Andrew Asbil, then Dean of Toronto, was elected.

She was created a Companion of the Roll of Honour of the Memorial of Merit of King Charles the Martyr in 2021.

Anglican Communion titles
Preceded by Ken Genge	Bishop of Edmonton, Canada; 1997–2007	Succeeded by Jane Alexander
Preceded by David Coles	Bishop of Christchurch; 2008–2018	Succeeded by Peter Carrell
