= Derek Hoskin =

Canadian Anglican bishop

Derek Balfour Erskine Hoskin is the former Anglican Bishop of Calgary. He was consecrated on 29 September 2006, having previously been the incumbent at Red Deer, Alberta.

Religious titles
Preceded by Barry Craig Bates Hollowell	Bishop of Calgary; 2006–-2011	Succeeded by Gregory Kerr-Wilson
