= Barry Hollowell =

Canadian Anglican bishop

The Right Reverend Barry Hollowell
- Bishop of Calgary
- Church: Anglican Church of Canada
- In office: 1999–2005
- Predecessor: Barry Curtis
- Successor: Derek Hoskin

Orders
- Ordination: 1974
- Consecration: 1999

Personal details
- Born: April 14, 1948 Boston, Massachusetts, United States
- Died: August 17, 2016 (aged 68) Calgary, Alberta, Canada
- Spouse: Linda Barry-Hollowell (d. 2008); Kevin Huang
- Children: 3
- Education: Valparaiso University (BA); Harvard University (MDiv); Cambridge University (BA and MA); Saint Paul University (MA); University of New Brunswick (MA); University of Calgary (PhD)

Barry Craig Bates Hollowell (April 14, 1948 – August 17, 2016) was an Anglican bishop in Canada. He was the seventh Bishop of Calgary.

== Life ==
Born in Boston, Massachusetts and educated at Valparaiso University after which he studied theology in the United Kingdom at Cambridge University and Westcott House. He then finished an M.Div. degree at the Episcopal Theological School (Cambridge, Massachusetts). He was ordained a priest in 1974. He was a deacon at All Saints' Chelmsford, Massachusetts and then assistant curate at Christ Church Cathedral, Fredericton, New Brunswick. He was then Anglican chaplain at the University of New Brunswick, rector of St George's St Catharines and, before his ordination to the episcopate, Archdeacon of Lincoln, Ontario. He resigned from the position of diocesan bishop of the Diocese of Calgary in 2005. Having previously completed master's degrees in both pastoral counselling (Saint Paul University in Ottawa) and in psychology (University of New Brunswick), he pursued doctoral studies and received a PhD in counselling psychology from the University of Calgary in 2012. His dissertation was entitled "The Experience of Spirituality in the Lives of Anglican Gay Men".

Anglican Communion titles
Preceded by John Barry Curtis	Bishop of Calgary; 1999–2005	Succeeded by Derek Balfour Erskine Hoskin
