= St. James' Cathedral (Peace River) =

Anglican cathedral in Alberta, Canada

Coordinates: 56.2351°N 117.2953°W

St. James's Cathedral, is the Anglican cathedral of the Diocese of Athabasca: it is in Peace River, Alberta, and celebrated its centenary in 2012.
