= Gerald Burch =

Canadian Anglican bishop (1911–2003)

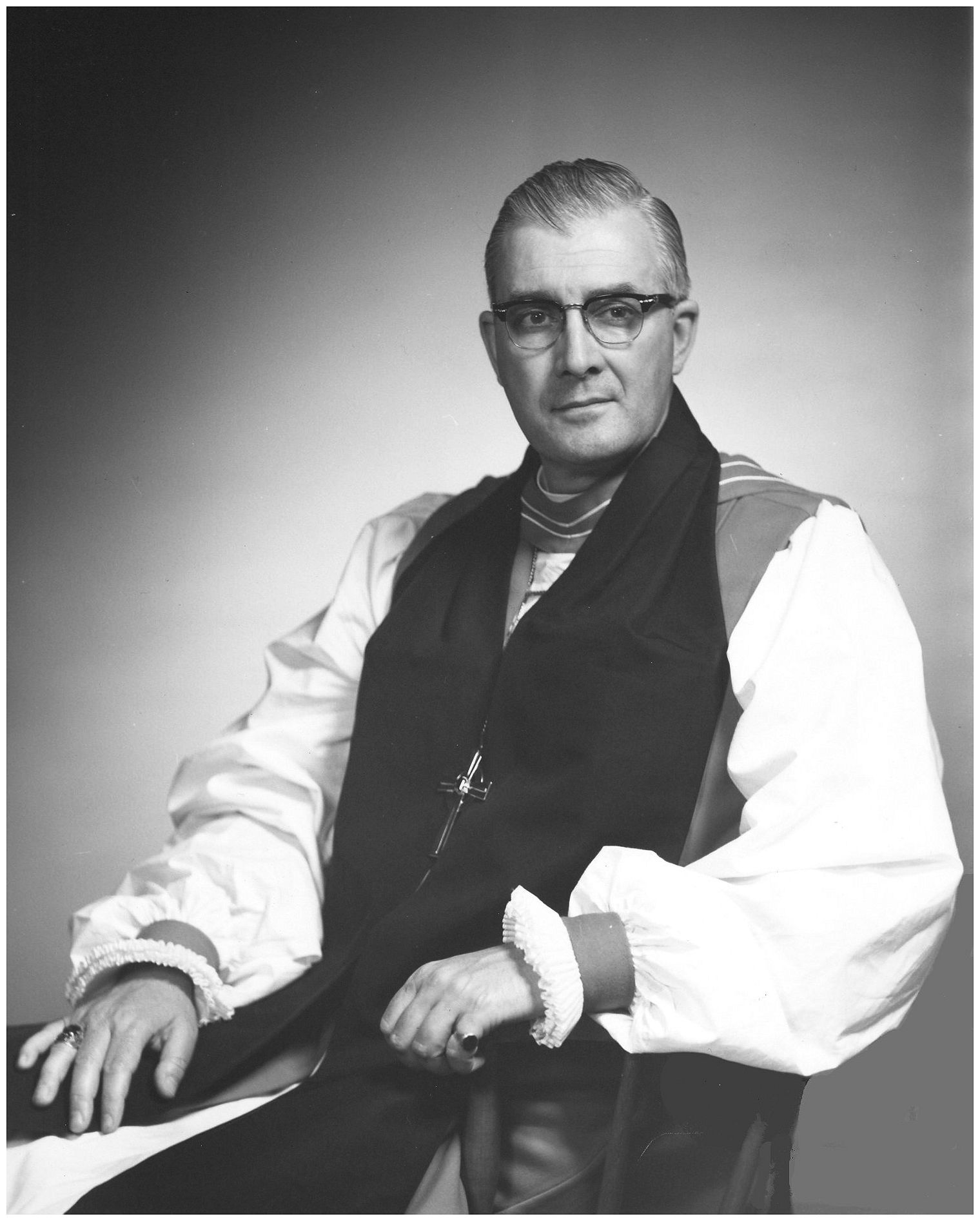

William Gerald Burch (5 March 1911 - 22 October 2003) was a Canadian Anglican bishop.

== Biography ==
Born in Winnipeg, Manitoba, on 5 March 1911 he was educated at the University of Toronto and ordained in 1938. He was a Curate at Christ Church, Toronto from 1936 to 1940. He held incumbencies at Scarborough Junction, St Luke, Winnipeg and All Saints, Windsor. He was Dean of All Saints Cathedral, Edmonton from 1956 to 1960 and Suffragan Bishop of Edmonton from 1960 to 1961. In that year he became its diocesan bishop, a post he held until 1976. He died on 22 October 2003 in Victoria, BC.

== Notes ==
Religious titles
Preceded by Walter Foster Barfoot	Bishop of Edmonton, Canada; 1961– 1976	Succeeded by John Arthur William Langstone
