= Michael Peers =

Canadian Anglican Primate (1934–2023)

The Most Reverend Michael Geoffrey Peers
- Primate Emeritus of the Anglican Church of Canada
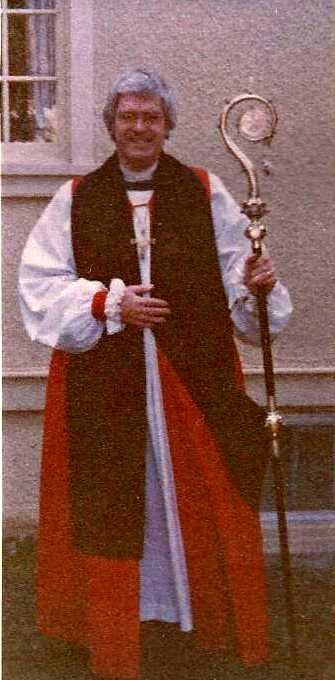
- Peers in Regina after election as Bishop of Qu'Appelle
- Church: Anglican Church of Canada
- See: Extra-diocesan
- In office: 1986–2004
- Predecessor: Ted Scott
- Successor: Andrew Hutchison
- Other posts: Archbishop of Qu'Appelle and Metropolitan of Rupert's Land (1981–1986); Bishop of Qu'Appelle (1976–1986)

Orders
- Ordination: 1960
- Consecration: 1977

Personal details
- Born: 31 July 1934 Vancouver, British Columbia, Canada
- Died: 27 July 2023 (aged 88) Toronto, Ontario, Canada
- Spouse: Dorothy Bradley
- Children: 3

Michael Geoffrey Peers (31 July 1934 – 27 July 2023) was a Canadian Anglican bishop who served as Primate of the Anglican Church of Canada from 1986 to 2004.

== Life and career ==
Born in Vancouver, British Columbia, Peers completed an undergraduate degree in languages at the University of British Columbia in 1956 and a diploma in translation at the University of Heidelberg in 1957. He had intended to embark on a career in diplomacy.

In the meantime, an interest in religion (which had begun in his youth after a non-religious upbringing) increased and he decided to seek ordination. He entered Trinity College at the University of Toronto, where he obtained a licentiate in theology. He was ordained as an Anglican priest and served in the following positions:

- Curate of Holy Trinity, Ottawa, in 1963
- Rector of St. Bede's, Winnipeg, 1965
- Archdeacon of Winnipeg, River North Anglican Parishes, Winnipeg, 1971
- Dean of Qu'Appelle (Regina, Saskatchewan) and rector of St. Paul's Cathedral, Regina, 1976–1978
- Bishop of Qu'Appelle (Regina, Saskatchewan), 1976–1986
- Archbishop of Qu'Appelle and Metropolitan of the Ecclesiastical Province of Rupert's Land, 1981–1986
- Primate of Canada, 1986–2004

Peers spoke English, French, Spanish, German and Russian. He was married with three children and four grandchildren. In 2006 his Grace Notes: Journeying With the Primate, 1995–2004 (ISBN 1-55126-437-4), a collection of his monthly columns in the Anglican Journal, was published, and in 2007 his The Anglican Episcopate in Canada: Volume IV, 1977–2007.

Peers was later confessor to the monastery of the Society of St. John the Evangelist in Boston and Ecumenist in Residence at the Toronto School of Theology.

Michael Peers died on 27 July 2023, at the age of 88.

== Major events of his primacy ==
Major events include:

- the introduction of the Book of Alternative Services (to supplement — but in effect replace — the Book of Common Prayer, and over the objections of the Prayer Book Society of Canada, which unsuccessfully litigated the matter in an ecclesiastical court over which Archbishop Peers presided);
- the achieving of full communion with the Evangelical Lutheran Church in Canada (in which he played a pivotal role);
- the formal apology to native peoples for the abuses which occurred in the Residential Schools;
- financial settlement with the federal government over aboriginal claims against native residential schools operated on the government's behalf principally by Anglican and Roman Catholic churches;
- en route to the 1978 Lambeth Conference touched down in the newly independent Solomon Islands and the then-North Solomons Province of Papua New Guinea though it was Roman Catholic and United Church, to the former of which he and Mrs. Peers returned, having established friendly relations and later as Primate sending a bishop;
- the stand taken by the Anglican Church in 1986 in support of Canada's northern people, who depended on the seal hunt, against the international animal rights lobby; towards the end of his tenure,
- the emergence of the issue of the ordination of gay and lesbian clergy (which he supported); and
- his presidency of the Metropolitan Council of Cuba (a council that oversees the episcopal work of the Protestant Episcopal Church of Cuba, once a part of the Episcopal Church in the United States which is because of US government policy no longer able to take any role there);
- his cultivation of a much closer relationship between the Anglican Church of Canada and the Episcopal Church of the United States.

Anglican Communion titles
Preceded by Fredric Jackson	Bishop of Qu'Appelle; 1976–1986	Succeeded by Eric Bays
Preceded by Frederick Crabb	Metropolitan of Rupert's Land; 1981–1986	Succeeded by Kent Clarke
Preceded by Ted Scott	Primate of the Anglican Church of Canada; 1986–2004	Succeeded by Andrew Hutchison
