= Walter Barfoot =

Canadian Anglican bishop

Walter Foster Barfoot (17 October 1894 – 28 June 1978) was a Canadian Anglican bishop.

Barfoot was educated at Wycliffe College and ordained in 1923. He was a tutor at the College of Emmanuel and St. Chad Saskatoon and then a professor at St John's College, Winnipeg. He became Bishop of Edmonton in 1941 and Primate of All Canada a decade later. Elected Metropolitan of Rupert's Land in 1953. He retired in 1959 and died in 1978.

Religious titles
Preceded by Arthur Burgett	Bishop of Edmonton, Canada; 1941–1953	Succeeded by Howard Clark
Preceded by Louis Sherman	Metropolitan of Rupert's Land; 1951–1959	Succeeded by Howard Clark
Preceded by Frederick Kingston	Primate of the Anglican Church of Canada; 1951–1959	Succeeded by Howard Clark
