= Ken Genge =

Canadian retired Anglican bishop (born 1933)

Orders
- Consecration: 14 May 1988 by Walter H. Jones

Kenneth Lyle Genge (born 25 October 1933) is a Canadian retired Anglican bishop.

Genge was educated at the University of Saskatchewan and ordained in 1958. He held incumbencies at Fort Pitt, Shellbrook, Yellowknife and St Michael and All Angels' Calgary. He was a conference retreat centre director from 1985 to 1988 when he became the Bishop of Edmonton. He retired in 1996.

Religious titles
Preceded by Edwin Kent Clarke	Bishop of Edmonton, Canada; 1988–1996	Succeeded by Victoria Matthews
