= Robert Park (priest) =

Archdeacon of Winnipeg (1885–1971)

Robert Elphinstone Park (b Leytonstone 21 June 1885 – d Winnipeg 21 May 1971) was Archdeacon of Winnipeg from 1949 until 1958.

Parker was born in Lakefield, Quebec, educated at St. John's College, Manitoba and ordained in 1911. After curacies at Miniota and Elkhorn he held incumbencies in Winnipeg, Byng Inlet and Elmwood.
