= John Clarke (bishop) =

Canadian Anglican bishop (born 1938)

John Robert Clarke (born 27 July 1938) is a retired bishop of the Anglican Church of Canada.

Clarke was educated at the University of Western Ontario and ordained in 1963. His first positions were as a curate at St Michael and All Angels', Toronto, and then priest in charge of the Church of the Apostles in Moosonee until 1984. He was then appointed Archdeacon of the Diocese of Athabasca in 1984 and its diocesan bishop in 1992. He was also Metropolitan of Rupert's Land from 2003 until 2009.

Anglican Communion titles
| Preceded by Gary Woolsey | Bishop of Athabasca; 1992–2009 | Succeeded by Fraser Lawton |
| Preceded by Tom Morgan | Metropolitan of Rupert's Land; 2003–2009 | Succeeded by David Ashdown |
