= Isaac Stringer =

Canadian Anglican bishop (1866–1934)

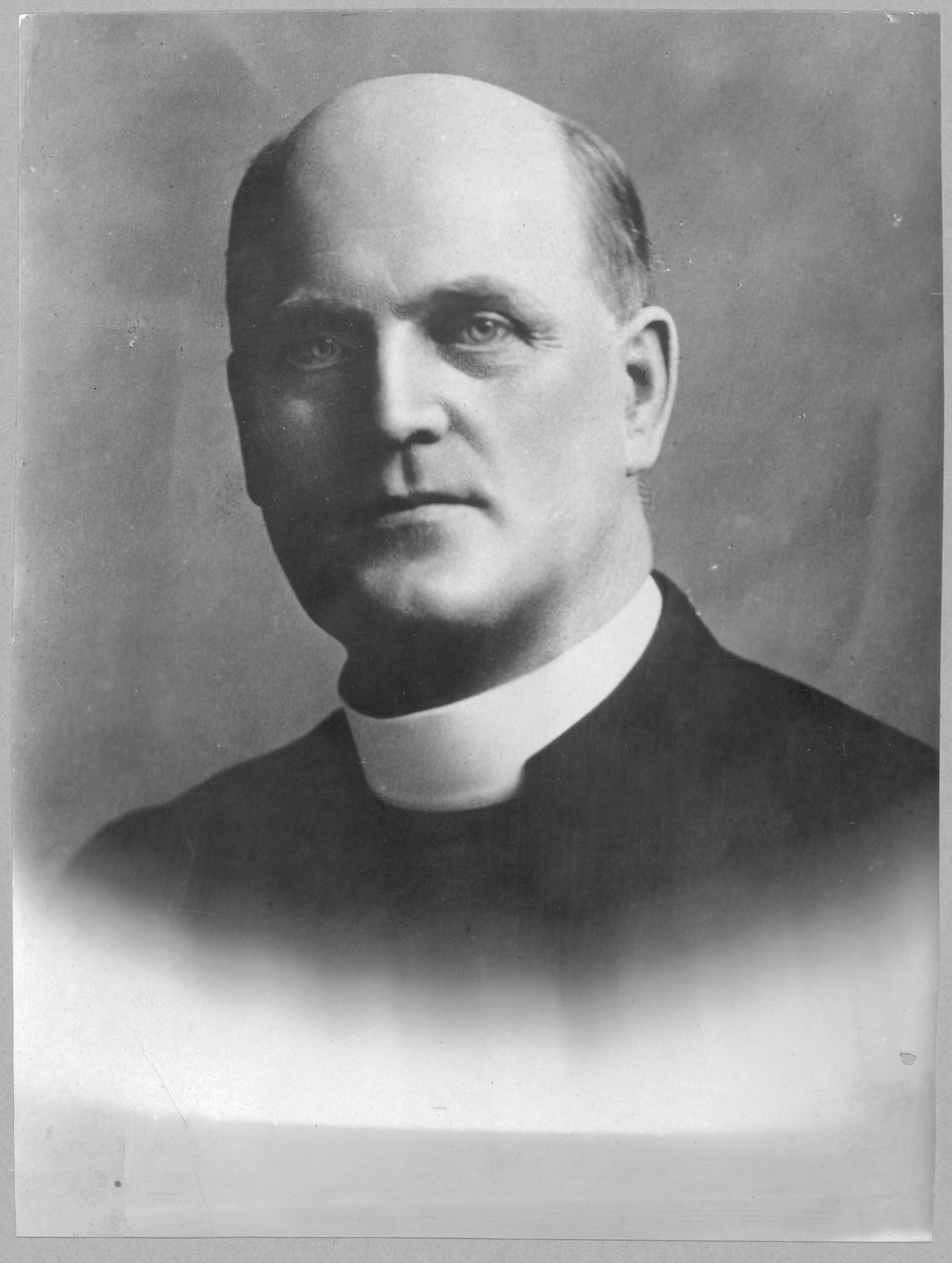
Isaac O Stringer

Isaac O Stringer (April 19, 1866 – October 30, 1934) was a Canadian Anglican bishop.

== Biography ==
Stringer was born in Kingarf, Ontario. He attended University College and Wycliffe College at the University of Toronto and received a BA degree in 1891. While at University College he served as Recording Secretary of the University College Literary and Scientific Society.

In 1892 he accepted a posting as a missionary to the Canadian Arctic and spent the majority of his life in northern Canada. In 1905 he was consecrated the second Bishop of Selkirk in the Yukon, a position he held until 1931 when he was named metropolitan of Rupert's Land and relocated to Winnipeg where he died on October 30, 1934. He was installed as diocesan bishop of Rupert's Land and as metropolitan of the province at the Cathedral of St. John (Winnipeg) on September 1, 1931.

Stringer was known during his life as "The Bishop Who Ate His Boots" as a result of an incident during a tour of his diocese in 1909. Running low on provisions, he found that the seal skin of his boots was sufficient as emergency sustenance. This epithet became the title of a biography of the bishop by Frank A. Peake.

Isaac's grandson, Richard Stringer worked on and mostly completed a documentary film about Isaac before he died, and his colleagues at the CSC finished and released the movie

One of Isaac's great-grandsons is Todd Mayhew. Todd and his wife, Sivan Agam, are the Australian/ British alternative folk duo The April Maze; they have written a song about Stringer's boot-eating story called "The Bishop Who Ate His Boots".

Canadian band Tanglefoot's song "Boot Soup" is based on the same incident.
