= Anglican Diocese of Edmonton =

Diocese of the Anglican Church in Canada

Diocese of Edmonton Dioecesis Edmontonensis Diocèse d'Edmonton
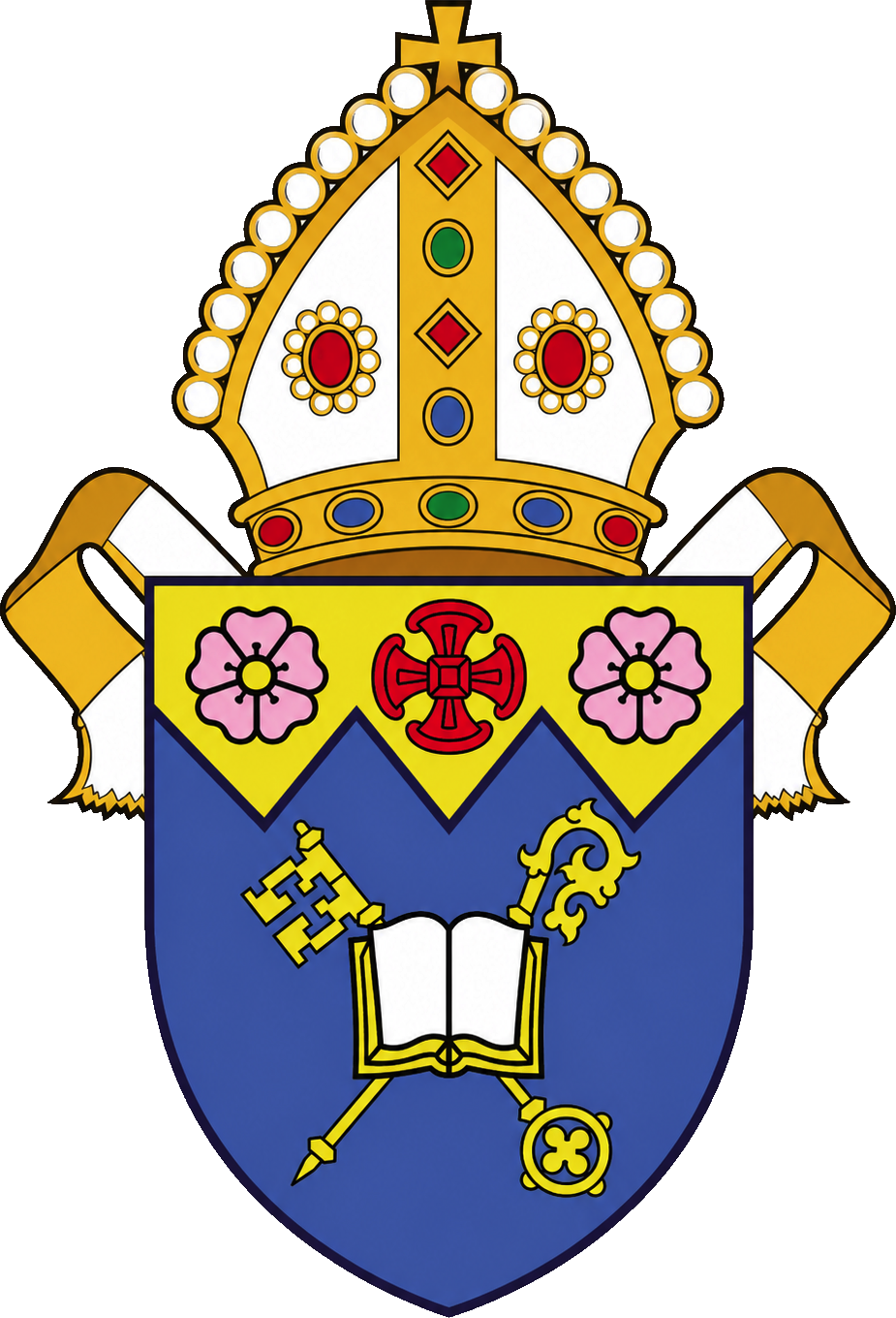

Location
- Country: Canada
- Ecclesiastical province: Northern Lights
- Archdeaconries: Edmonton, McLeod River, Strathcona, Vermilion River
- Headquarters: All Saints Anglican Cathedral, Edmonton, AB, Canada
- Coordinates: 53.540°N 113.497°W

Statistics
- Parishes: 44 (2022)
- Members: 5,912 (2022)

Information
- Denomination: Anglican Church of Canada
- Rite: Anglican
- Cathedral: All Saints' Cathedral, Edmonton

Current leadership
- Bishop: Stephen London

Map
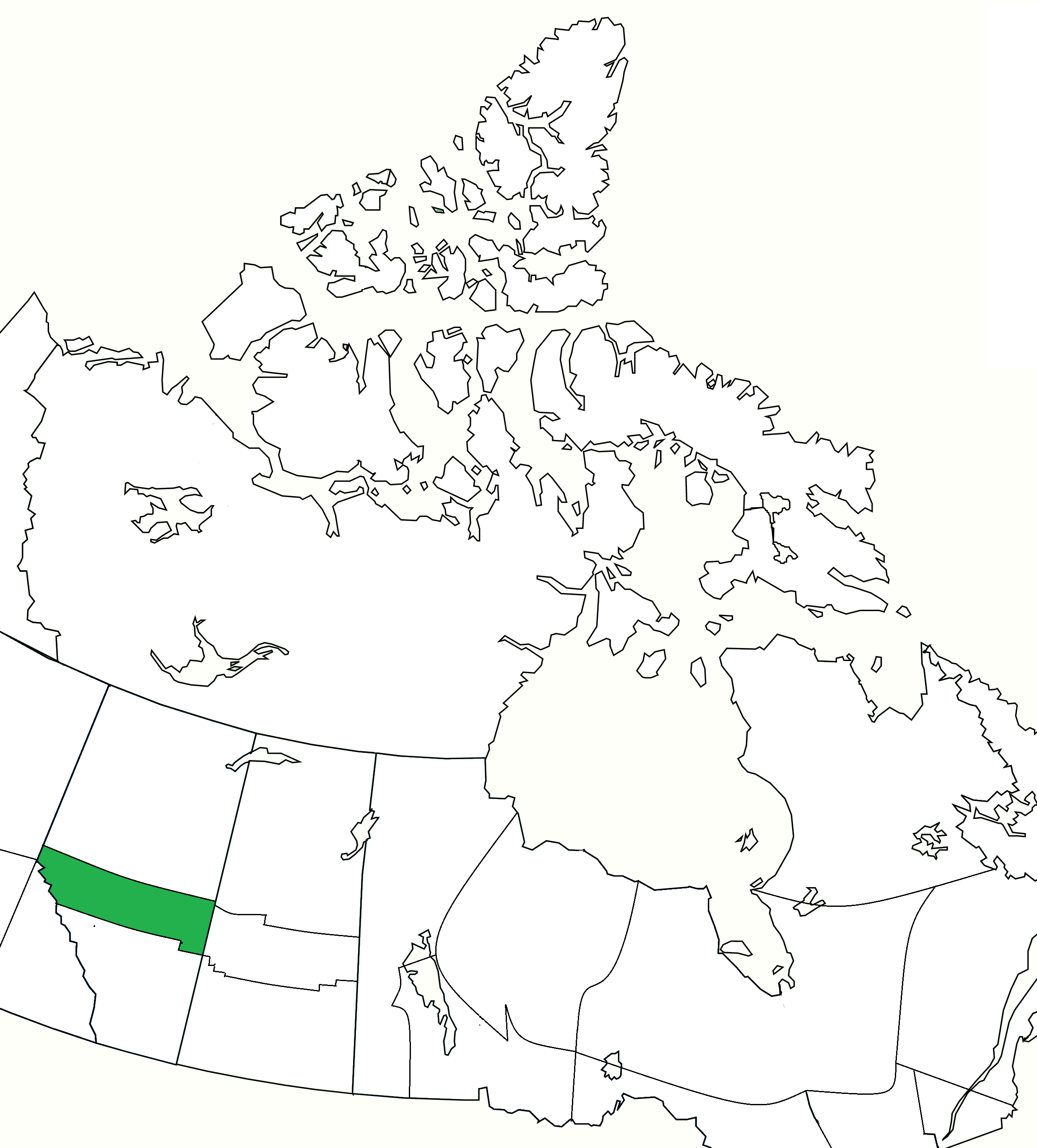
- Boundaries of the diocese within the Province of the Northern Lights

Website
- edmonton.anglican.ca

The Diocese of Edmonton is a diocese of the Ecclesiastical Province of the Northern Lights of the Anglican Church of Canada. The diocese comprises over 126,000 square kilometres of the civil Province of Alberta, consisting of a band across the central part of the province, extending to the borders of the adjacent provinces of British Columbia to the west and Saskatchewan to the east. Its See city is Edmonton, and its roughly 7,000 Anglicans on parish rolls are served by 53 parishes, according to the most recent figures published by the Anglican Church of Canada.

The diocese was established in 1913 when it was divided from the Diocese of Calgary (which in turn had been divided from the Diocese of Saskatchewan in 1888). The following year, the diocese was incorporated by the Alberta legislature.

Edmonton is the major city within the diocese. Other communities are a mix of small, rural centres and suburban bedroom communities of the capital.

A lay order, the Company of the Cross ran the Saint John's School of Alberta which closed in 2008. In the past, the school and order were specifically under the control of the diocese and bishop.

== Bishops of Edmonton ==
No.	Image	Name	Dates	Notes
1		Henry Gray	1914–1931	
2		Arthur Burgett	1932–1940	
3		Walter Barfoot	1941–1954	Primate of the Anglican Church of Canada 1950-1959
4		Howard Clark	1954–1961	Primate of the Anglican Church of Canada 1959-1971
5		Gerald Burch	1962–1976	
6		John Langstone	1976–1979	
7		Kent Clarke	1980–1987	Metropolitan of Rupert's Land, 1986–1987
8		Ken Genge	1988–1996	
9		Victoria Matthews	1997–2007	Anglican Diocese of Christchurch 2008–2018
10		Jane Alexander	2008–2021	
11		Stephen London	2021–	Consecrated Sept 18, 2021
