= Anglican Diocese of Calgary =

Diocese of the Anglican Church in Canada

Diocese of Calgary Diocèse de Calgary

Location
- Country: Canada
- Ecclesiastical province: Northern Lights
- Coordinates: 51.046°N 114.060°W

Statistics
- Parishes: 67 (2022)
- Members: 7,523 (2022)

Information
- Rite: Anglican
- Cathedral: Cathedral Church of the Redeemer, Calgary

Current leadership
- Bishop: Gregory Kerr-Wilson

Map
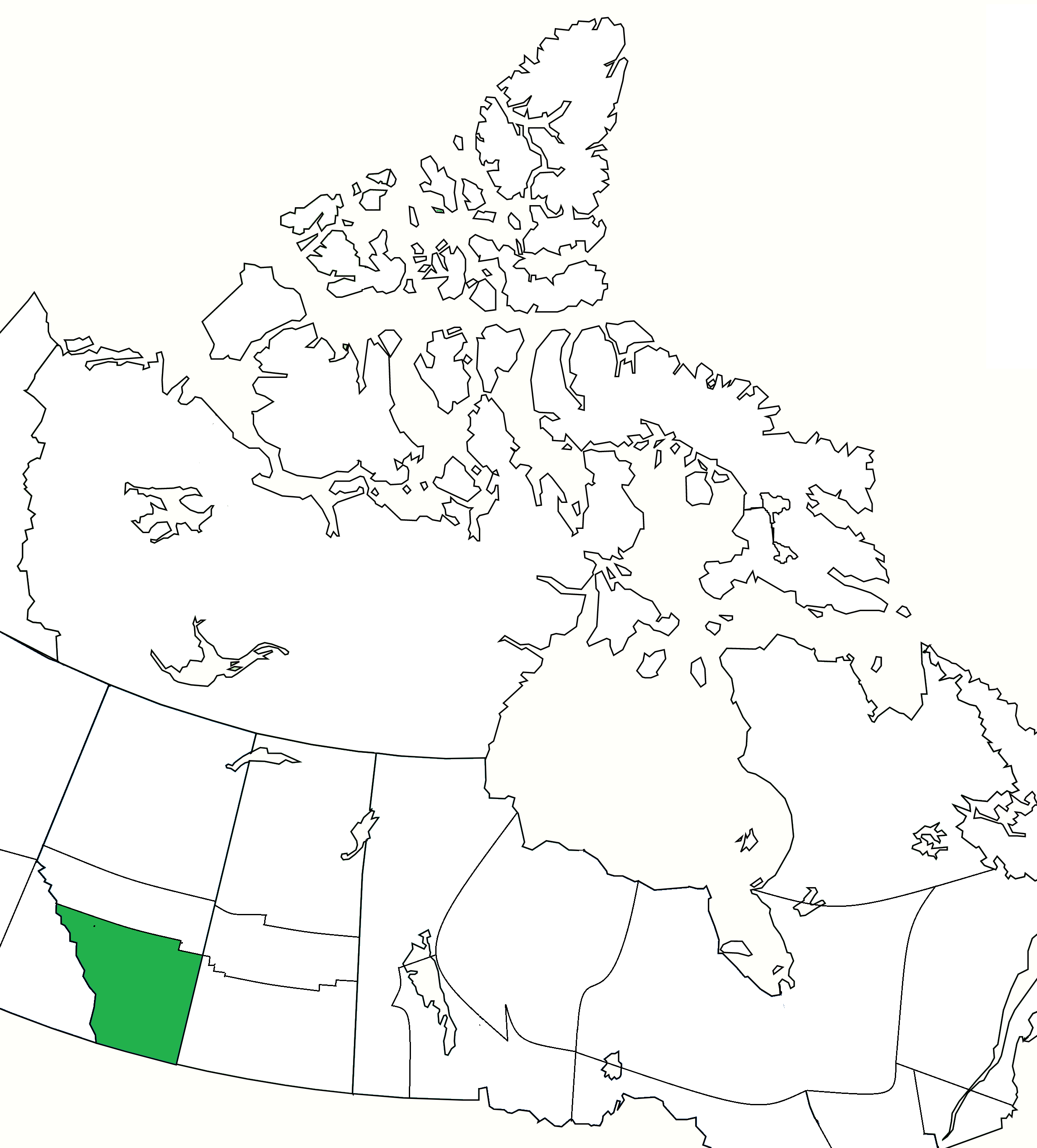
- Boundaries of the diocese within the Province of the Northern Lights

Website
- calgary.anglican.ca

The Anglican Diocese of Calgary is a diocese of the Ecclesiastical Province of the Northern Lights of the Anglican Church of Canada, located in the southern part of the civil province of Alberta. It was established in 1888. The diocesan boundaries are: on the south, the border between Alberta and the United States; on the east, the Alberta-Saskatchewan border; on the west, the Alberta-British Columbia border and on the north, an uneven east–west line drawn across the province just north of Lacombe forms the northern boundary of the Diocese of Calgary and the southern boundary of the Diocese of Edmonton. This area of about 82,000 square miles (210,000 km^{2}) includes regions of mountain, foothills, parkland and prairie. The see city is Calgary. Other cities in the diocese are Red Deer, Medicine Hat and Lethbridge.

There are about 7,500 Anglicans on the rolls of the 67 parishes in the diocese, according to the most recent figures published by the church, with an average Sunday attendance of nearly 2,500.

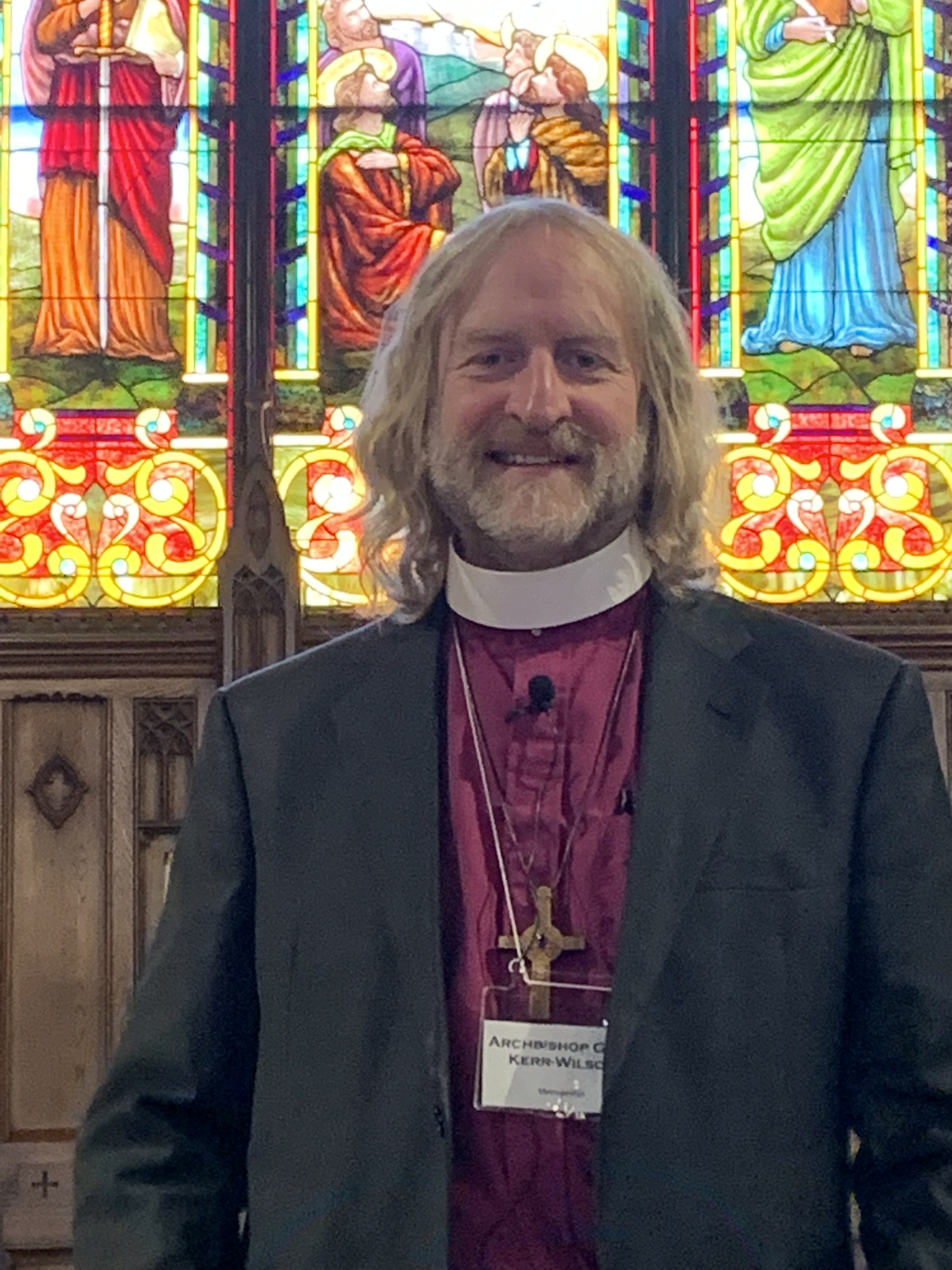
Greg Kerr-Wilson

No.	Name	Dates	Notes
1	Cyprian Pinkham	1888–1927	
2	Louis Sherman	1927–1943	
3	Harry Ragg	1943–1952	
4	George Calvert	1952–~1967	
5	Morse Goodman	1968–1983	
6	Barry Curtis	1983–1999	Metropolitan of Rupert's Land, 1994–1999
7	Barry Hollowell	1999–2005	
8	Derek Hoskin	2006–2011	
9	Greg Kerr-Wilson	2012–present	Metropolitan of Rupert's Land, 2015–2024; Metropolitan of the Northern Lights, 2024–present
