= Ecclesiastical Province of the Northern Lights =

Unit of the Anglican Church of Canada

Ecclesiastical Province of Northern Lights
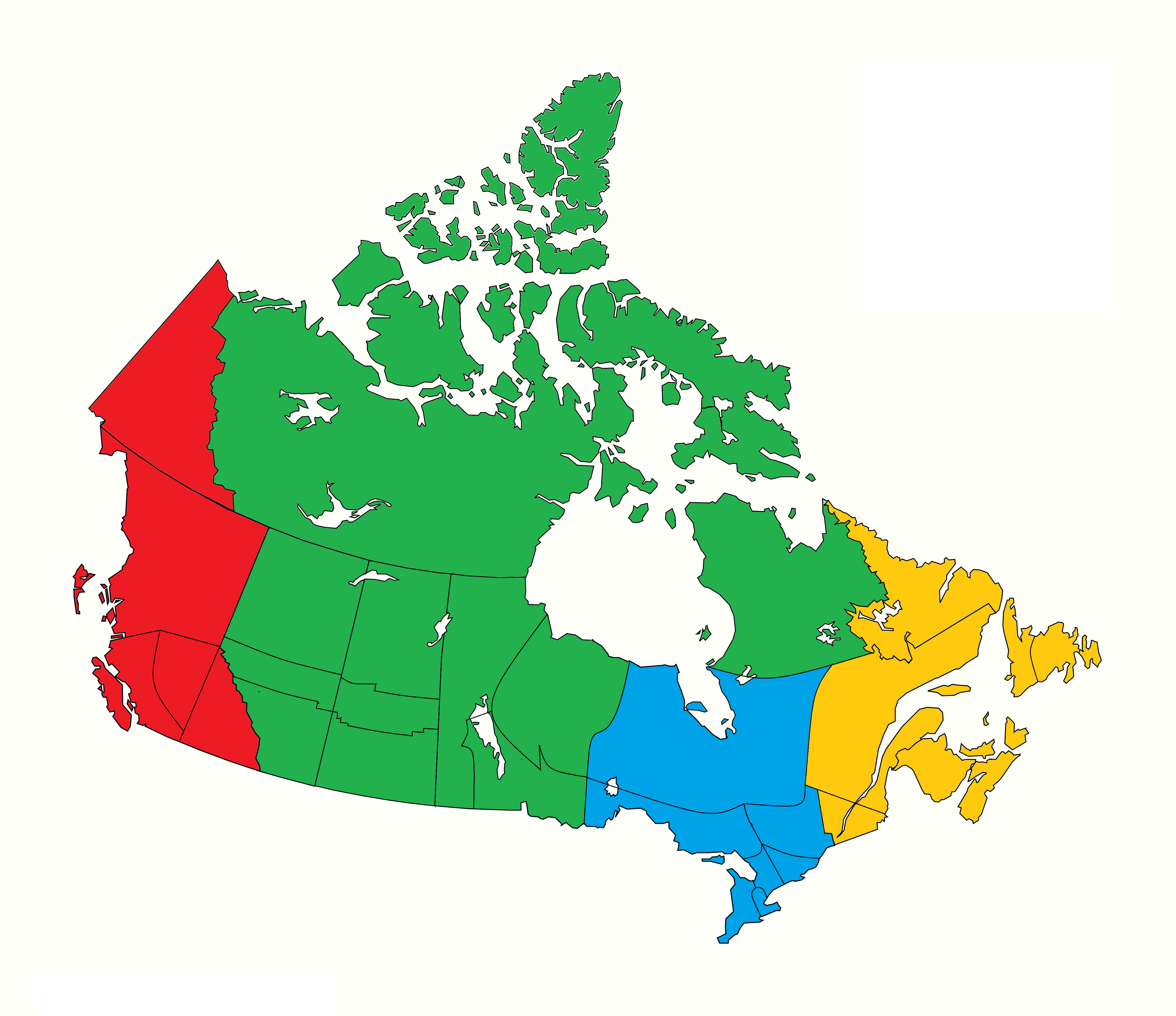
- The extent of the Province of Northern Lights shown in green
- Church: Anglican Church of Canada
- Metropolitan bishop: Greg Kerr-Wilson
- Cathedral: Cathedral Church of the Redeemer
- Dioceses: 10

Arms of the Ecclesiastical Province

The Ecclesiastical Province of the Northern Lights, founded in 1875 as the Province of Rupert's Land, forms one of four ecclesiastical provinces in the Anglican Church of Canada.

== Territorial evolution ==
The territory covered by the province is roughly coterminous with the western portion of the former Hudson's Bay Company concession of Rupert's Land, as well as the North-Western Territory of British North America. It today consists of the present day provinces of Alberta, Saskatchewan, and Manitoba, as well as the extreme western portion of Ontario and the Nunavik area of Quebec. It also includes all of the territories of Nunavut and the Northwest Territories.

At almost 6.5 million square kilometres, it is the largest ecclesiastical province by area in the country, and was even larger when it was created. The Anglican Diocese of Moosonee was joined to the Ecclesiastical Province of Ontario in 1912. The five dioceses in British Columbia were also originally part of Rupert's Land Ecclesiastical Province, until they became an Ecclesiastical Province of their own in 1914. Furthermore, the Diocese of Selkirk was part of Rupert's Land until it joined the British Columbia province in 1943, as the Anglican Diocese of Yukon.

In 2024, the provincial synod voted to rename the province as the Ecclesiastical Province of the Northern Lights.

== Dioceses ==
There are presently 10 dioceses in the province:

- Athabasca (Northern Alberta)
- Arctic (Northwest Territories, Nunavut, and Nunavik (northern Quebec))
- Brandon (Western Manitoba)
- Calgary (Southern Alberta)
- Edmonton (Central Alberta)
- Mishamikoweesh (northern Manitoba and northwestern Ontario)
- Qu'Appelle (Southern Saskatchewan)
- Rupert's Land (Southeastern Manitoba and Northwestern Ontario)
- Saskatchewan (Northern Saskatchewan)
- Saskatoon (Central Saskatchewan)

== Metropolitan ==
The provinces of the Anglican Church of Canada are headed by metropolitan bishops, elected from among the provinces' diocesan bishops, who then become archbishops of their own diocese and the metropolitan of their province.

The current metropolitan of the Province of the Northern Lights is Greg Kerr-Wilson who is the Archbishop of Calgary.

== Metropolitans of Rupert's Land ==
Order	Name	Dates	Diocese	Notes
1st	Robert Machray	1875–1904	Rupert's Land	Primate of All Canada, 1893-1904
2nd	Samuel Matheson	1904–1931	Rupert's Land	Primate of All Canada, 1909–1930
3rd	Isaac Stringer	1931–1934	Rupert's Land	
4th	Malcolm Harding	1935–1942	Rupert's Land	
5th	Louis Sherman	1943–1953	Rupert's Land	
6th	Walter Barfoot	1954–1960	Rupert's Land	Primate of All Canada, 1950-1959
7th	Howard Clark	1961–1969	Rupert's Land	Primate of All Canada, 1959-1971
8th	Fredric Jackson	1971–1976	Qu'Appelle	
9th	Frederick Crabb	1976–1981	Athabasca	
10th	Michael Peers	1981–1986	Qu'Appelle	Primate of the Anglican Church of Canada, 1986 — 2004
11th	Kent Clarke	1986–1987	Edmonton	
12th	Walter H. Jones	1988–1993	Rupert's Land	
13th	Barry Curtis	1994–1999	Calgary	
14th	Tom Morgan	2000–2003	Saskatoon	
15th	John Clarke	2003–2008	Athabasca	
16th	David Ashdown	2009–2014	Keewatin	
17th	Greg Kerr-Wilson	2015-	Calgary	Archbishop of Calgary

== See also ==
- Ecclesiastical provinces of the Anglican Church of Canada
- List of dioceses of the Anglican Church of Canada
