= Primate of the Anglican Church of Canada =

Anglican archbishopric in Canada

- Archbishopric

Anglican
- Incumbent; Shane Parker
- Style: The Most Reverend

Location
- Country: Canada
- Ecclesiastical province: Extraprovincial

Information
- First holder: Robert Machray
- Established: 1893
- Parent church: Anglican Church of Canada

Website
- www.anglican.ca/primate/

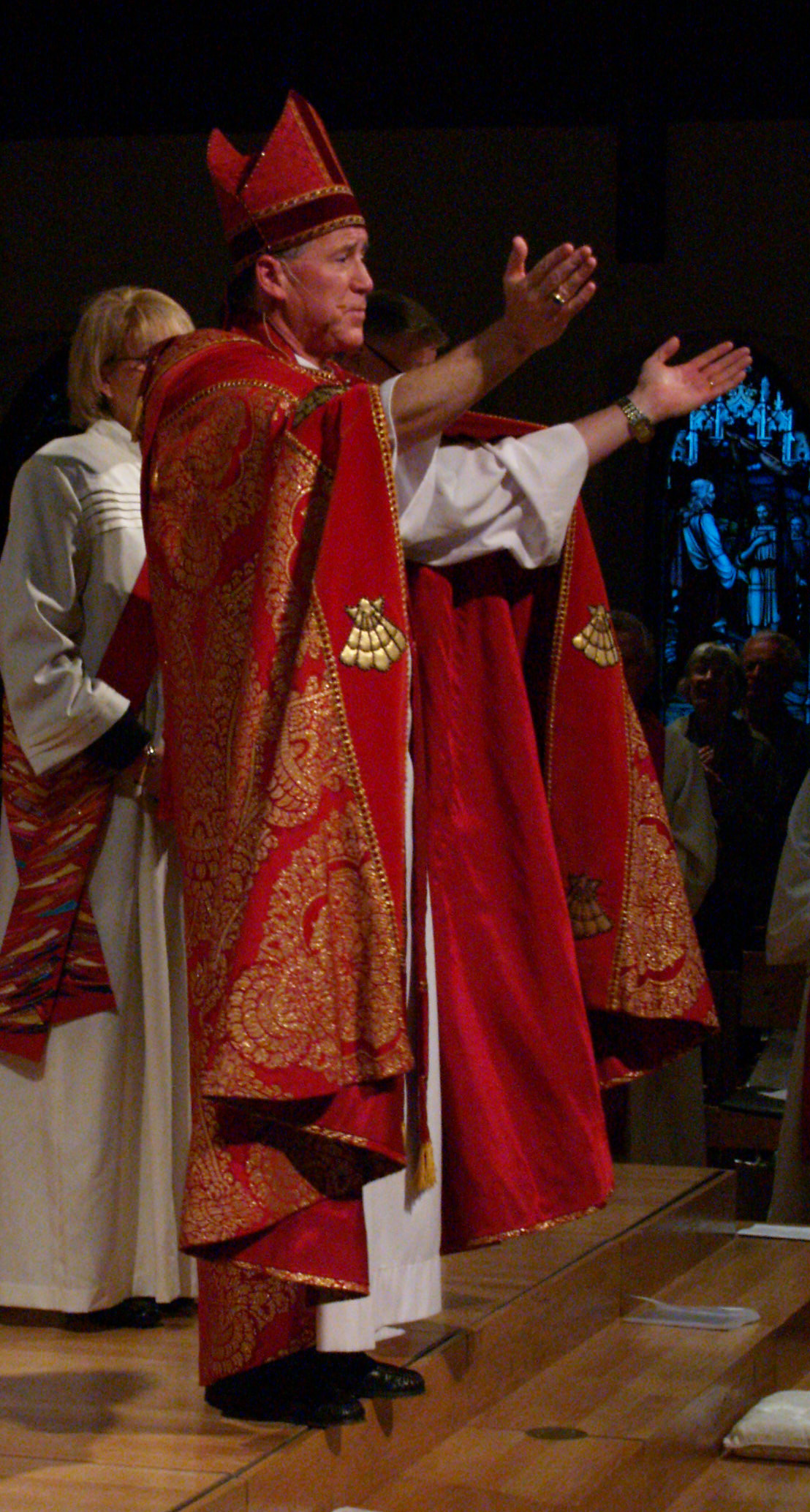
Fred Hiltz, Primate from 2007–2019

The Primate of the Anglican Church of Canada (referred to in older documents as the Primate of All Canada or the Primate of Canada) is the primate of the Anglican Church of Canada and is elected by the General Synod of the Church from among a list of five bishops nominated by the House of Bishops. Since 1969, the role of diocesan (or metropolitan, assistant, suffragan or coadjutor) bishop is relinquished upon their election, as the Primate assumes the role of Chief Executive Officer of the National Church Office, which is located in Toronto. Additionally, the Primate serves as the President of the General Synod, the chair of the Council of General Synod and the chair of the House of Bishops. The Primate holds the title of Archbishop and is styled as "The Most Reverend (Name), Primate of Canada".

The Primate, while not holding the responsibility for a particular diocese, has a pastoral responsibility for the entire Anglican Church of Canada. This requires a great deal of travel throughout Canada and abroad. In addition to playing a significant administrative role, the Primate also has an important pastoral and educational role in the Church. Because the Primate does not have diocesan responsibilities, ordinations, appointments of clergy and confirmations are not a frequent part of primatial ministry. The Primate serves until age 70, or earlier resignation.

The Primate speaks in the name of the Anglican Church of Canada after consultation with, or in accordance with the policies of, the General Synod or the Council of General Synod. As well, the Primate often represents the Canadian Church in international and ecumenical partnerships and dialogues, including the Lambeth Conference, the Primates' Meetings of the Anglican Communion and at the World Council of Churches gatherings.

Shane Parker was elected the 15th primate by the 2025 General Synod of the church and installed on June 29, 2025, succeeding acting primate Anne Germond.

== List of Primates ==
There have been fifteen primates in the history of the Canadian church, including one acting primate:

Order	Image	Name	Tenure	Diocese
1st		Robert Machray	1893–1904	Rupert's Land
2nd		William Bond	1904–1906	Montreal
3rd		Arthur Sweatman	1907–1909	Toronto
4th		Samuel Matheson	1909–1932	Rupert's Land
5th		Clarendon Worrell	1932–1934	Nova Scotia
6th		Derwyn Owen	1934–1947	Toronto
7th		Frederick Kingston	1947–1949	Nova Scotia
8th		Walter Barfoot	1949–1959	Edmonton and Rupert's Land
9th		Howard Clark	1959–1971	Edmonton and Rupert's Land
10th		Ted Scott	1971–1986	Kootenay
11th		Michael Peers	1986–2004	Qu'Appelle
12th		Andrew Hutchison	2004–2007	Montreal
13th		Fred Hiltz	2007–2019	Nova Scotia
14th		Linda Nicholls	2019–2024	Huron
–		Anne Germond (Acting)	2024–2025	Algoma
15th		Shane Parker	2025–present	Ottawa
