= Robert McDonald (missionary) =

Missionary priest (1829–1913)

- Born: November 7, 1829; Red River Colony, Rupert's Land
- Died: August 20, 1913; Winnipeg, Manitoba
- Venerated in: Anglican Church of Canada
- Feast: 30 August, 15 December

Robert McDonald (November 7, 1829 – August 20, 1913) was an Anglican missionary among First Nation peoples in Canada, particularly in the northwest Arctic.

== Early life ==
A second generation Canadian, Robert McDonald was born in 1829 to Scots immigrant Neil McDonald, an employee of the Hudson's Bay Company, and his wife Ann Logan (daughter of a retired Hudson's Bay trader) at Point Douglas, Red River Colony (what became Winnipeg, Manitoba). The second of ten children, McDonald attended the Red River Academy until he was 15, then helped his father on the family farm for four years before taking a position with the Methodist mission at Norway House.

== Career ==
McDonald also studied at St. John's Collegiate School (predecessor of the University of Manitoba founded in 1877), which enabled him to take holy orders as an Anglican deacon in 1852. Bishop David Anderson of Rupert's Land ordained him as a priest in 1853. His first posting was at the White Dog (or Islington) Mission at the junction of the Winnipeg and Lac Seul Rivers among the Ojibwe people, now known as the Wabaseemoong Independent Nations or Whitedog First Nation. Using a syllabic method and Latin alphabet, McDonald began translating the Bible into Ojibwe (also known as Ojibwa or Chippewa), and completed the minor prophets before his next assignment.

In 1862, the Church Missionary Society sent McDonald to the Yukon Territory, where he became the first Protestant missionary ever assigned to work among indigenous peoples of the Arctic. His work involved extensive travel in the Yukon and Northwest Territories, as well as what became Alaska. When gold was discovered, McDonald became the first missionary in the Klondike. He also interacted with Catholic and Russian Orthodox missionaries, sometimes sharing translators among the various tribes in his vast assigned territory. In over forty years, Rev. McDonald baptised over 2000 people, adults as well as children, and educated many at schools he established. His initial station, at Ft. Yukon, was thought to be in Canada, but turned out to be in Alaska. He later worked along the Porcupine River and established another base at Fort McPherson on the Peel River.

McDonald spent most of the next four decades working among the Gwich'in people (who call themselves Dinjii Zhuu, and which was sometimes transcribed as "Tinjiyzoo"). However, in 1872, he accepted an invitation of the Church Missionary Society and took a working vacation in England, shortly after the Hudson's Bay Company sold its lands to Canada, leading to the Red River Rebellion of 1869 and finally the creation of Manitoba as the country's fifth province.

In 1876, a year after McDonald received a promotion to Archdeacon of the newly created Mackenzie diocese, he married Julia Kutuq, a Gwich'in woman, with whom he eventually had nine children. According to Heeney, Julia and only 3 children survived their father.

McDonald achieved lasting recognition for his translations, having established an alphabet for the previously oral Gwich'in. With the help of Julia and other native speakers, McDonald translated the Bible, Book of Common Prayer and many hymns into Gwich'in (which he called Takudh and, later, Tukudh). His translation work helped unify the various tribes speaking similar Athabaskan languages. In 1911, McDonald published a dictionary and grammar for the language under the title of A Grammar of the Tukudh Language.

== Death and legacy ==
McDonald retired in 1905 to Winnipeg, where he died at his home in 1913. He is buried in the cemetery of St. John's Cathedral in Winnipeg.

His journals are in the Yukon archives in Whitehorse, as well as among the Archives of the Ecclesiastical Province of Rupert's Land deposited with the Archives of Manitoba.

The Canadian Calendar of Holy Persons of the Anglican Church of Canada remembers Rev. McDonald on August 30.

MacDonald Avenue in Winnipeg may be named to honor him.
