= Cathedral of St. John (Winnipeg) =

St. John's Anglican Cathedral
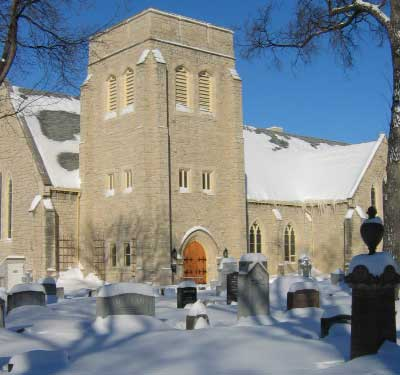
- St. John's Anglican Cathedral
- 49.920488°N 97.125230°W
- Location: 135 Anderson Avenue; Winnipeg, Manitoba; R2W 5M9
- Country: Canada
- Denomination: Anglican

History
- Status: Cathedral

Architecture
- Functional status: Active
- Architect(s): Parfitt and Prain
- Architectural type: Norman-Gothic

St. John's Cathedral is an Anglican cathedral in Winnipeg, Manitoba, Canada, which is the cathedral church of the Diocese of Rupert's Land. It is located in the Luxton neighbourhood of north-end Winnipeg on Anderson Avenue near Main Street and the Red River. St. John's Cathedral marks the birthplace of the Anglican Church in western Canada.

== History ==
=== Early history ===
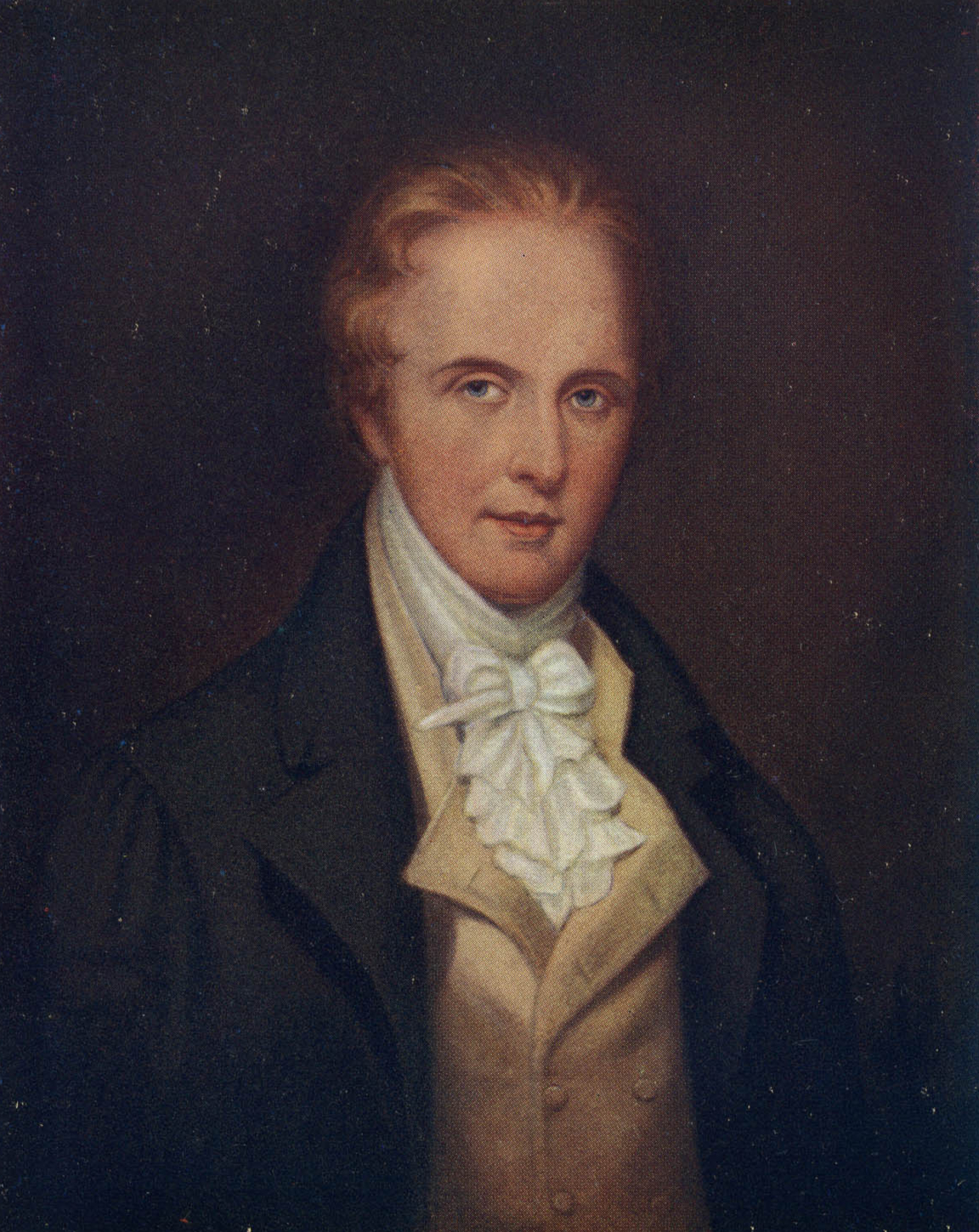
In 1817, Thomas Douglas, 5th Earl of Selkirk chose the site in which a church would be built

In 1812, the first group of Selkirk Settlers established a burying ground immediately south of the present cathedral. It is the oldest Canadian Anglican parish west of the Great Lakes, which was established in October 1820 when the Rev. John West, the first Anglican priest in Western Canada, arrived from England under the auspices of the Church Missionary Society and the Hudson's Bay Company in the Red River Colony (or Selkirk Settlement) to serve as chaplain to the Hudson's Bay officers and men, missionary to the aboriginal people in the area, and pastor to the Selkirk Settlers. The site for the church was chosen by Thomas Douglas, 5th Earl of Selkirk, during his visit to the settlement in the summer of 1817. The majority of the Selkirk Settlers were Presbyterians, but they attended Anglican services until the first Presbyterian minister arrived in 1851.

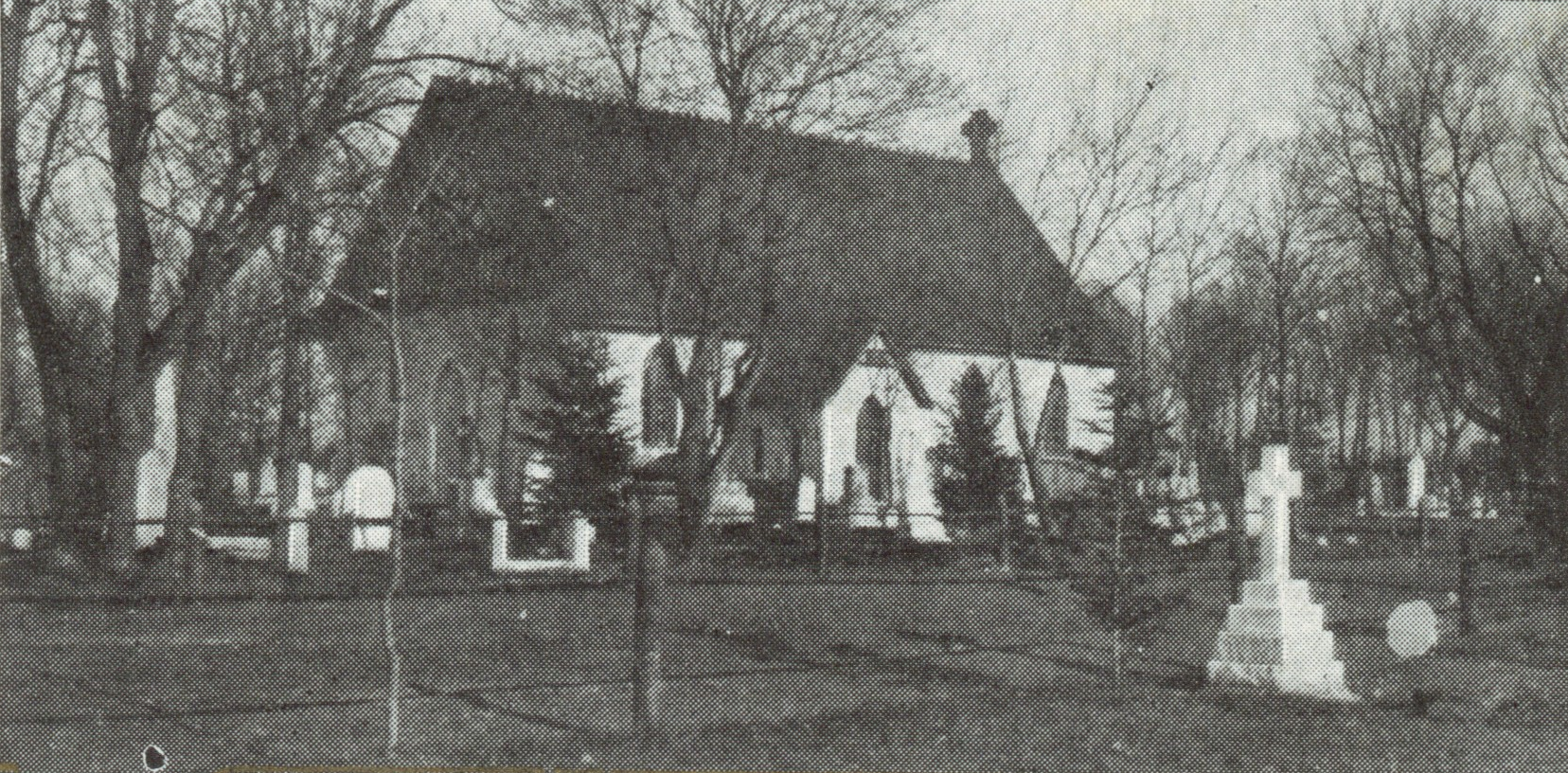
Saint John's Cathedral in 1909

There have been four churches on the site. The first was a Church Mission House constructed in 1822 by the Rev. John West near the south-east corner of the present cemetery; however, it was washed away in the great flood of 1826. In 1833 it was replaced by a second church, a stone building built on the site of the present Cathedral. This second church became the first Anglican Cathedral in Western Canada soon after the first Bishop of Rupert's Land, the Rt. Rev. David Anderson, was consecrated in 1849. The building was severely weakened by the flood of 1850, and thus a third building, also of stone, was erected on the same site from 1862 to 1863.

=== Present building (1926–present) ===
The fourth and present Cathedral was reconstructed in 1926 using most of the stone from the previous building under the guidance and inspiration of Archbishop Samuel P. Matheson. It was regarded by him as a tribute and memorial of his predecessor, Archbishop Robert Machray. Archbishop Machray, who succeeded Bishop David Anderson in 1865, is regarded by many local Anglicans as having given unsparingly of his time and talents to St. John's and the Diocese of Rupert's Land for almost forty years. In 1893 he became the first Primate of the Anglican Church of Canada.

Since 2002, St. John's Cathedral has been the only Canadian site to host the annual Trinity Conference by web cast from New York. In September, 2004, St. John's Cathedral was designated as a Heritage Site by the Hon. Eric Robinson, Manitoba Minister of Culture, Heritage and Tourism. The historical designation covers both the cathedral and the surrounding cemetery. In 2012, the Cathedral hosted a service of thanksgiving in commemoration of the 200th anniversary of the founding of the Red River Settlement (or Red River Colony). Those attending included today's Lord Selkirk, James Douglas-Hamilton, Baron Selkirk of Douglas, along with many descendants of the original settler families.

== Design ==
The present cathedral was designed by architects Parfitt and Prain, the cathedral is Norman-Gothic in style. The chancel was extended by eight feet in 2005 to allow for use of a chancel altar. All the furnishings in the chancel, with the exception of the organ console, can be removed, providing space for concerts, dance recitals, plays and other activities. In 2004 a sound and light booth, coat racks and library were installed in the narthex. The lighting in the cathedral was upgraded in 2007.

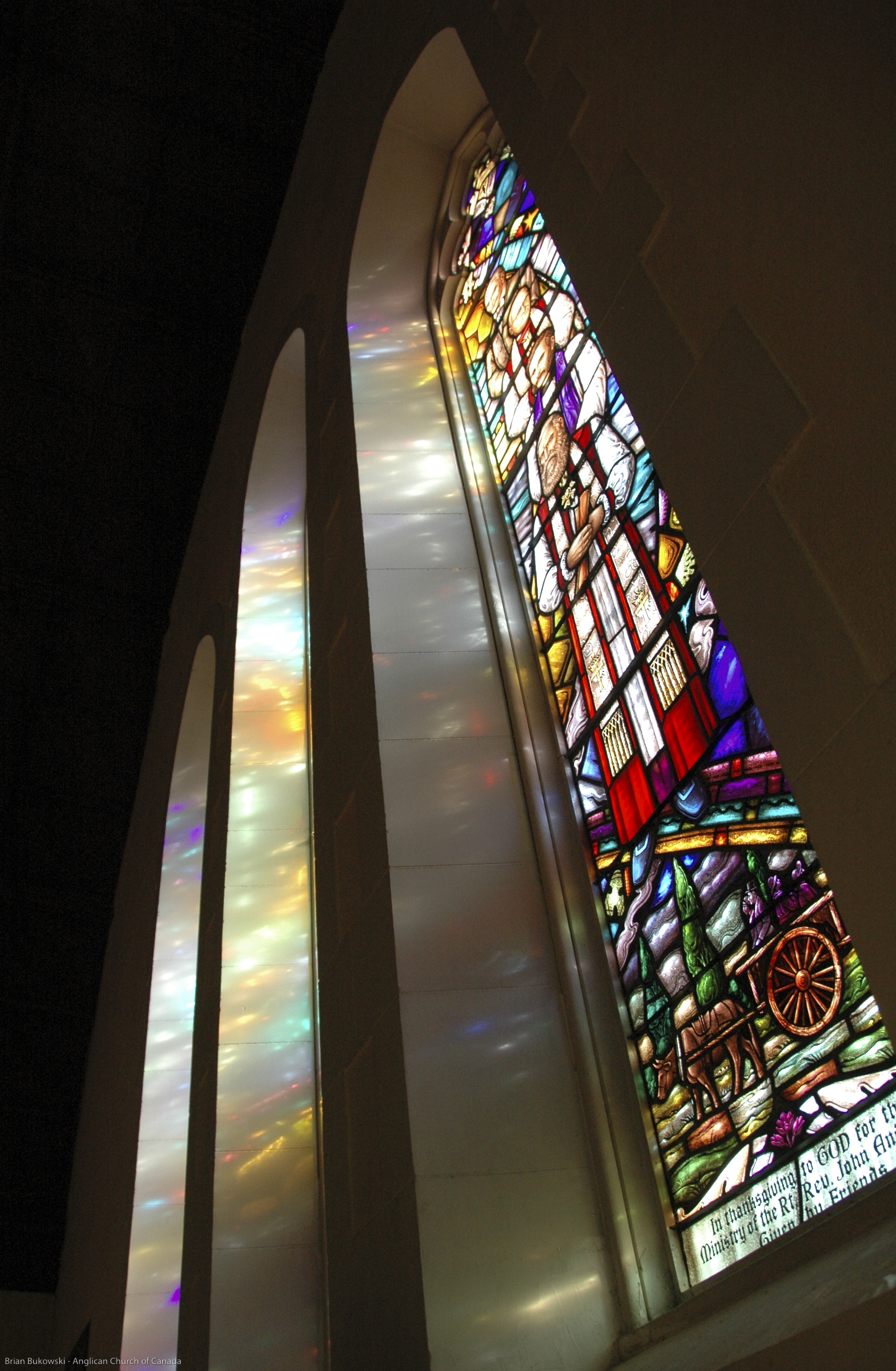
Stained-glass windows at the cathedral

The Institute for stained glass in Canada has documented the historical and traditional stained glass at Cathedral of St. John (Winnipeg). The organ, a gift of the women of the parish in 1927, is a three-manual Casavant pipe organ of thirty-nine speaking stops. In 1927, the organ cost $8,700.00 CAD. Its replacement cost today would be close to $750,000.00 CAD. In addition to the organ, the cathedral also uses a fine Baldwin grand piano.

=== Furnishing ===
Furnishings of interest are the solid brass eagle lectern (known affectionately as Big Bird since it was installed), a gift in 1890 to Archbishop Robert Machray on the 25th anniversary of his consecration as bishop, the intricately carved hexagonal oak pulpit (1907), the Italian marble font (1870), and a Coventry cross, made of nails salvaged from the mediaeval Coventry Cathedral which fell victim to the Blitz in World War II. The cathedral also has a wealth of stained glass windows by various designers.

=== Cemetery ===
The cemetery, which surrounds the cathedral, is considered by locals as the history of Winnipeg in stone. It was established by the Selkirk Settlers after their arrival in the Red River Colony (Selkirk Settlement) in 1812, so it pre-dates the parish by eight years. The oldest marked grave (1832) is that of eight-month-old George Simpson, son of George and Francis Ramsay Simpson, the Governor of the Hudson's Bay Company and his wife. The earliest graves were destroyed in the flood of 1826. Among the prominent citizens whose resting place is the cemetery are William Forbes Alloway, Bishop John Ogle Anderson, Alfred Andrews, James Henry Ashdown, Dan Bain, Derek Bedson, Samuel Lawrence Bedson, George Montegu Black Sr., Elizabeth Anne 'Nancy' (Mermagen) McGowan, Aileen Alexia Allingham Clarke, Dean Coombes, Horace Everett, Edward Anthony Wharton Gill, Bishop John Grisdale, John Inkster, Archbishop Walter H. Jones, Margaret Konantz, Ruby Louise Brown Locke, Alexander Logan, Robert Logan, William Luxton, Sir Hugh John Macdonald, Archbishop Robert Machray, John Matheson, John W. Matheson, Archbishop Samuel Matheson, Alexander McBeth, Andrew McDermot, Robert McDonald, Alexander Shirriff Morrison, Sir Augustus Meredith Nanton, Leonard Towne Sterndale Norris-Elye, George William Northwood, Premier John Norquay, John Draper Perrin, John Draper (Jack) Perrin Jr., John Pritchard, George Taylor Richardson, The Hon. James Armstrong Richardson, P.C., James Armstrong Richardson Sr., Conrad Stephenson Riley, John Herbert Riley, Robert Sanford Riley, Robert Thomas Riley, Donald Ross, Lieutenant Governor The Honourable Sir John Christian Schultz, George Henry Sellers, Henry Eugene Sellers, Rev. James Settee, Archbishop Louis Sherman (bishop), Maj.-Gen. Sir Sam Steele, Archbishop Isaac Stringer, Edna Sutherland, John Sutherland (Canadian Senator), John Barton Taylor, Dr. W. F. Taylor, James Thomson, Lieutenant Governor William Johnston Tupper and Lieutenant Governor Errick Willis.

== Community involvement ==
St. John's Cathedral engages in several community ministries. Through its Outreach Ministry, the cathedral provides financial grants to organizations in Winnipeg's North End supporting literacy projects, community kitchens, and resident bursaries. Additional programs offer housing for newly arrived refugees in Manitoba.

The congregation also supports local charitable initiatives, including Winnipeg Harvest’s Shelf-Help program, the Thelma Wynne Project (which supplies clothing for newborns), and the Joshua Tree program, which provides children from low-income families with winter gear largely handknitted by parishioners.

Annually, the cathedral hosts a Festival of Advent Lessons and Carols, drawing visitors from across the Diocese of Rupert's Land with historical re-enactments.

== Deans of Rupert's Land ==
- 1882–1896: John Grisdale (Bishop of Qu'Appelle, 1896)
- 1897–1902: James Dallas O'Meara
- 1902–1905: Samuel Pritchard Matheson (Archbishop of Rupert's Land, 1905)
- 1905–1911: George Frederick Coombes
- 1922–1934: John William Matheson
- 1949–1954: John Ogle Anderson (Bishop of British Columbia, 1968)
- 1954-1958 J.B. Thomas
- 1958–1982: William Edward Harrison
- 1982–1990:James Ernest “Jim” Setter
- 1990-1996:
- 1996–2010: Robert Osborne
- 2012–2024: Paul N. Johnson
