= Calendar of saints (Anglican Church of Canada) =

Liturgical year of the Anglican Church of Canada

Prior to the revision of the Anglican Church of Canada's (ACC) Book of Common Prayer (BCP) in 1962, the national church followed the liturgical calendar of the 1918 Canadian Book of Common Prayer. Throughout most of the twentieth century, the situation in Canada resembled that which pertained in much of the Anglican Communion: There was uncertainty as to whether post-Reformation figures (with the exception of the martyred Charles I) could or should be commemorated. In the words of the calendar's introduction, "New names have been added from the ancient calendars, and also from the history of the Anglican Communion, without thereby enrolling or commending such persons as saints of the Church." The 1962 revision added twenty-six post-Reformation individuals, as well as commemorations of the first General Synod and of "The Founders, Benefactors, and Missionaries of the Church in Canada." Of the calendar days, twenty-eight were highlighted as "red-letter days" — that is, days of required observation.

With the publication of the Book of Alternative Services (BAS) in 1985, a revised and expanded calendar was introduced. This was supplemented, in 1994, with the publication of For All The Saints; a book of propers, short biographies and descriptions of the commemorations, and readings by or about the individuals or events commemorated (there were also some very minor changes to the 1985 calendar). As the BAS has largely supplanted the BCP for most Canadian Anglicans, so too has its calendar. Nonetheless, the BCP calendar is still in use and individuals and parishes can legitimately choose to observe it.

The chief difference between the 1962 and 1985 calendars is the elimination of observations for several European figures, in order to include individuals of interest to the Canadian Church, and to the worldwide Anglican Communion. Similar to the Calendar of saints of the Church of England, the Patriarchs of Old are omitted in both the Book of Common Prayer and the newer Book of Alternative Services, for the Anglican Church of Canada.

In the ACC, the calendar is officially referred to as the Canadian Calendar of Holy Persons.

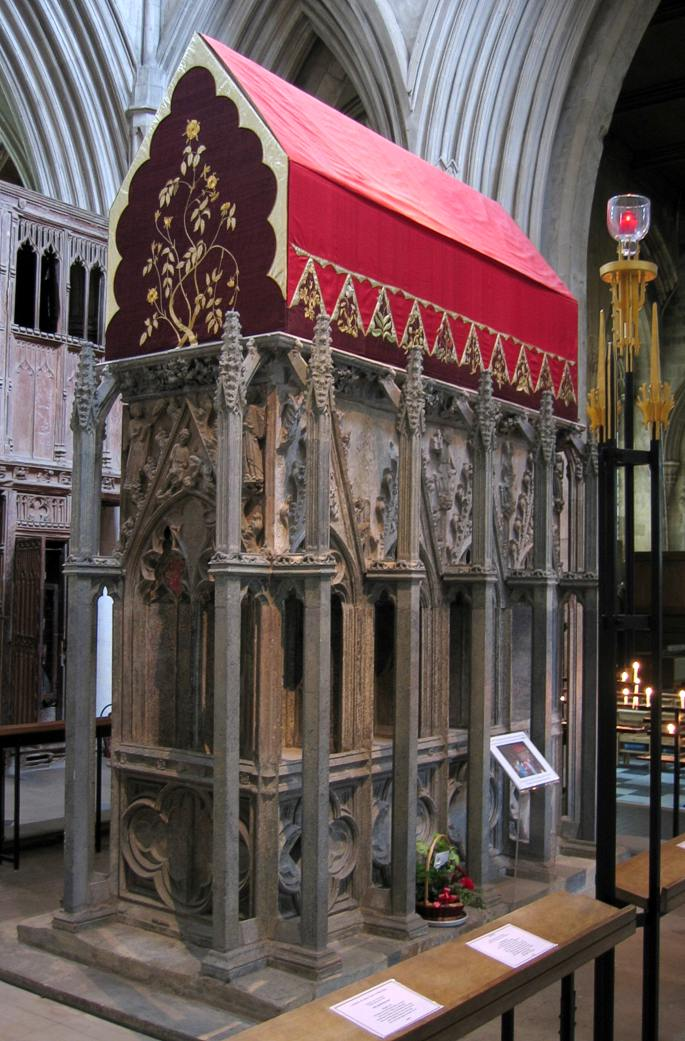
Shrine of Saint Alban, first British martyr, commemorated on June 22

== Book of Alternative Services Calendar ==
=== Days of observance ===
The revised calendar follows the Anglican custom of delineating between days of required observance ("red-letter days") and days of optional observance ("black letter days"). The way the calendar breaks these down is as follows:

==== Principal Feasts ====
- Easter Day
- Ascension Day
- The Day of Pentecost (Whitsunday)
- Trinity Sunday
- All Saints Day
- Christmas Day
- Epiphany

==== Feasts of Our Lord ====
- The Naming of Jesus
- The Baptism of the Lord
- The Presentation of the Lord
- The Annunciation of the Lord
- The Visit of the Blessed Virgin Mary to Elizabeth
- The Birth of St. John the Baptist
- The Transfiguration of the Lord
- Holy Cross Day

==== Other Major Feasts ====
- All Feasts of Apostles
- All Feasts of Evangelists
- The Holy Innocents
- Saint Joseph
- St. Mary Magdalene
- Saint Stephen
- St. Mary the Virgin
- The Beheading of John the Baptist
- St. Michael and All Angels

==== Fasts ====
- Ash Wednesday and other weekdays of Lent and Holy Week
- Good Friday and all other Fridays of the year, except in Christmas, Easter, and dominical Feasts

==== Days of Optional Observance ("black-letter days") ====
- Memorials (first class days of optional observance)
- Commemorations (second-class days of optional observance)
- Rogation Days
- Harvest Thanksgiving
- Ember days

In addition, some parishes observe other days commemorated elsewhere in the Christian tradition, such as Corpus Christi, Lammas-day, etc. Some individual parishes have their own calendars, which include the names of individuals significant to the parish or its identity, with which they supplement the national calendar.

=== The calendar ===
The following is the calendar of the Anglican Church of Canada according to the Book of Alternative Services. On those days in which there are two commemorations, a pattern of alternating the observance by year is recommended.

==== January ====
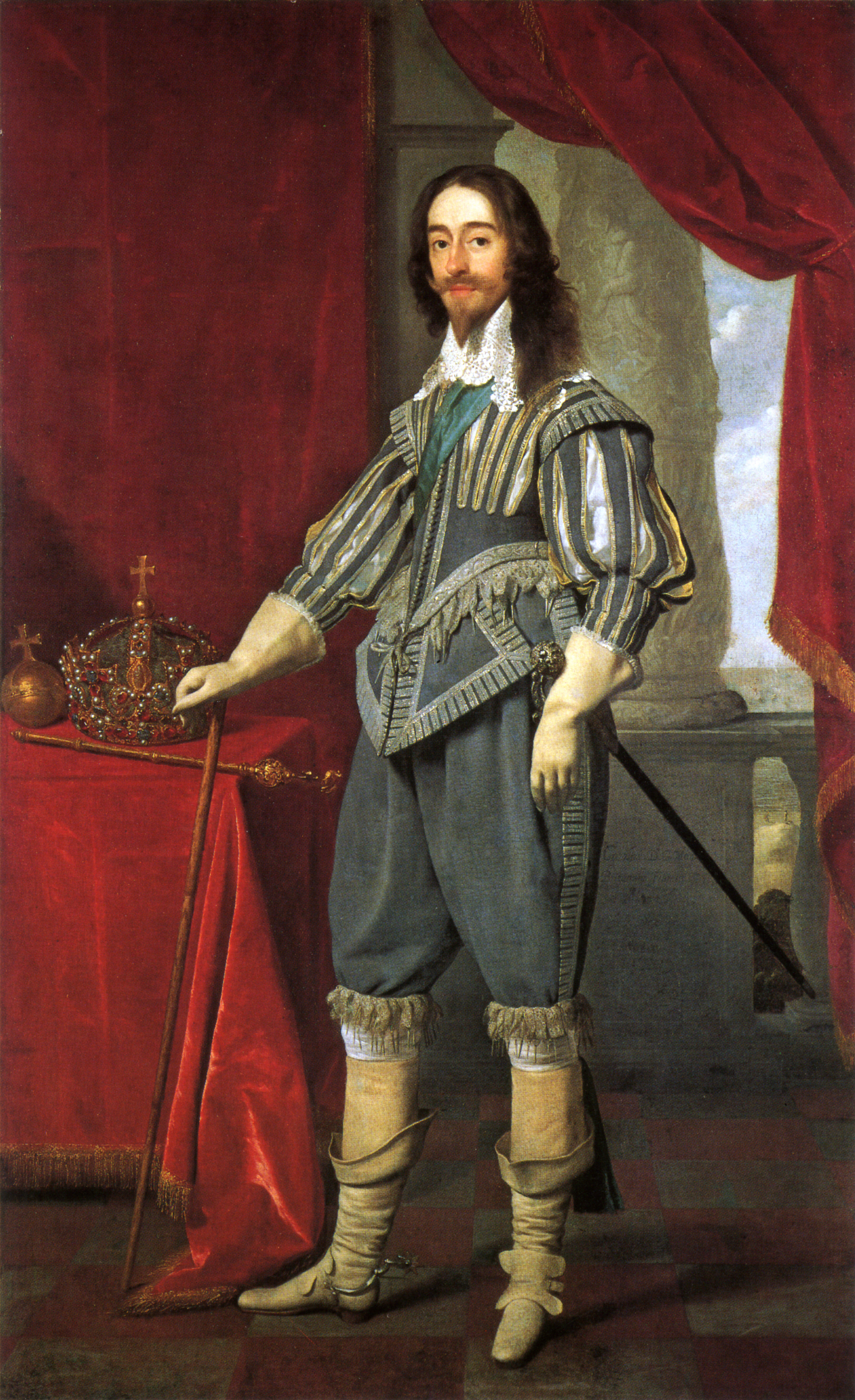
Charles, King and Martyr, the only saint canonized by the Anglican Church, commemorated January 30

Day	Commemoration	Year of death	Type^{1}
1	The Naming of Jesus (known in BCP as "The Circumcision of our Lord")	n/a	Holy day
2	St. Basil the Great and St. Gregory of Nazianzus, Bishops, Teachers of the Faith	379, 389	Memorial
6	The Epiphany of the Lord	n/a	Principal feast
10	William Laud, Abp of Canterbury	1645	Commemoration
11 (or Dec 28)	The Holy Innocents	n/a	Holy day
12	Marguerite Bourgeoys, Educator†	1700	Commemoration
12	John Horden, Bishop, Missionary	1893	Commemoration
13	St. Hilary of Poitiers, Teacher of the Faith	367	Memorial
15	Richard Meux Benson, Religious	1915	Commemoration
17	St. Antony of Egypt, Abbot	356	Memorial
18	The Confession of St. Peter the Apostle	n/a	Holy day
21	St. Agnes of Rome, Martyr	304	Commemoration
22	Vincent of Saragossa, Deacon	304	Commemoration
24	Francis de Sales, Bishop, Teacher of the Faith†	1622	Commemoration
25	The Conversion of St. Paul	n/a	Holy day
26	St. Timothy and St. Titus, Missionaries	n/a	Memorial
27	St. John Chrysostom, Bishop, Teacher of the Faith	407	Memorial
28	St. Thomas Aquinas, Teacher of the Faith	1274	Memorial
30	Charles Stuart, King of England and Scotland, Martyr	1649	Commemoration

==== February ====
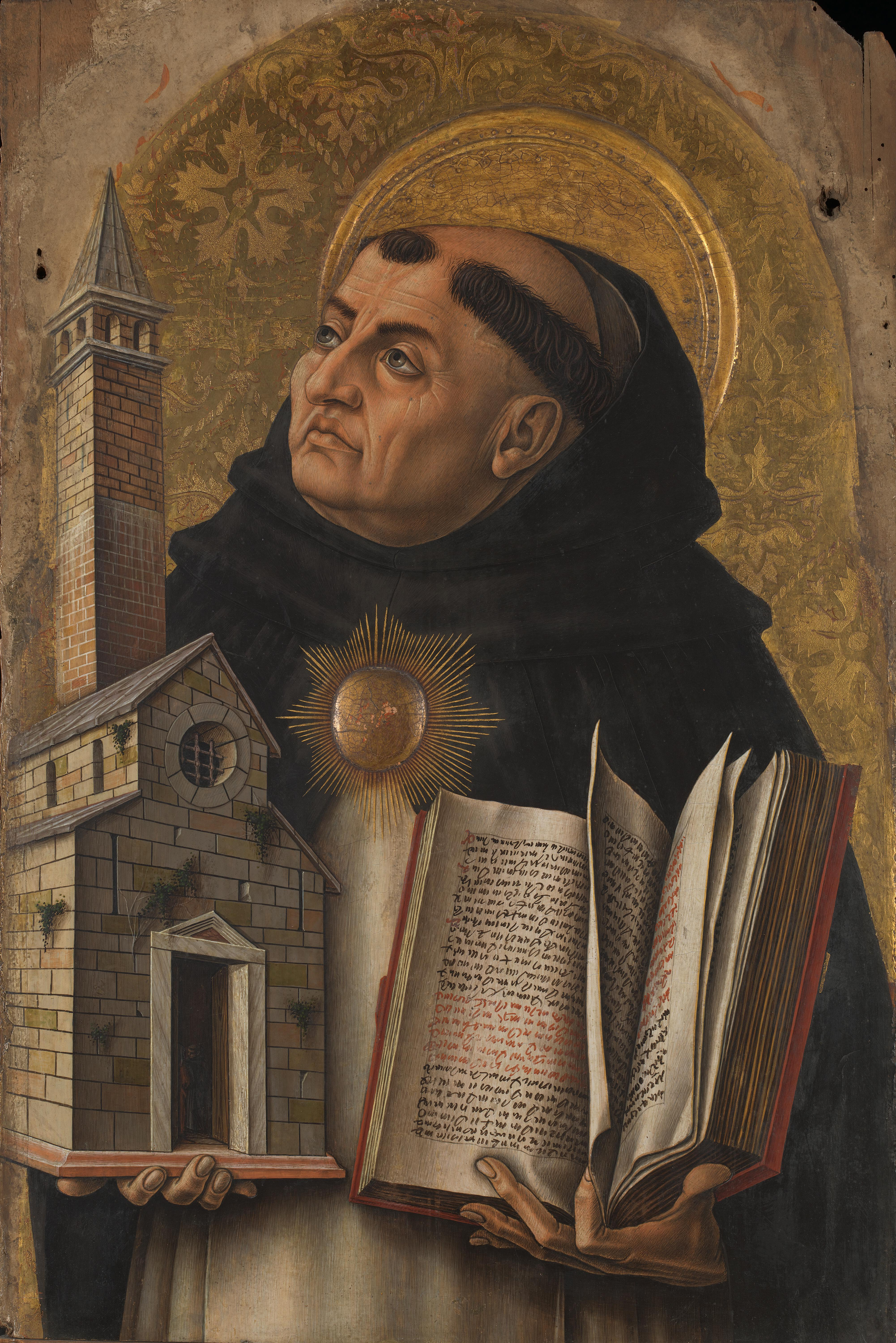
St. Thomas Aquinas, commemorated January 28

Day	Commemoration	Year of death	Type^{1}
2	The Presentation of the Lord (Candlemas)	n/a	HD
3	St. Anskar, Missionary	865	Com
5	Martyrs of Japan	1597	Mem
9	Hannah Grier Coome, Religious	1921	Com
14	Sts. Cyril and Methodius, Missionaries	869, 885	Mem
15	Thomas Bray, Priest, Missionary	1730	Mem
23	St. Polycarp of Smyrna, Bishop, Martyr	156	Mem
24	Philip Lindel Tsen, Bishop	1954	Com
24	Paul Shinji Sasaki, Bishop	1946	Com
26	Florence Li Tim Oi, Priest^{2}	1992	Mem
27	George Herbert, Priest, Poet	1633	Com

==== March ====
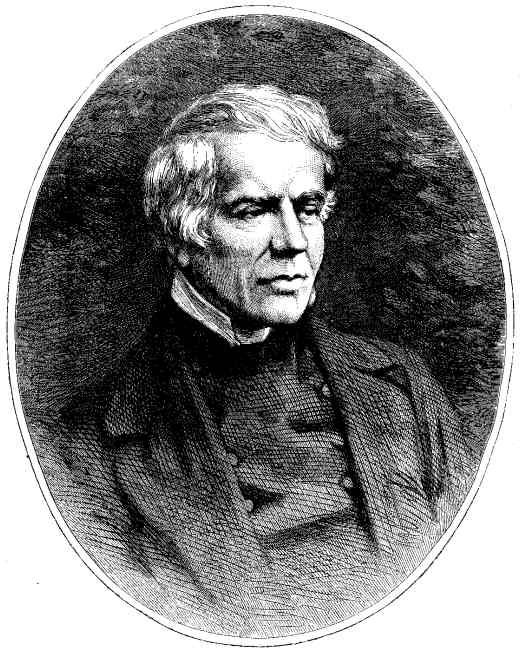
John Keble, commemorated March 29

Day	Commemoration	Year of death	Type^{1}
1	St. David of Wales, Abbot Bishop	c. 544	Mem
2	St. Chad of Mercia, Bishop, Missionary	672	Com
3	John and Charles Wesley, Priests, Evangelists	1791, 1788	Com
7	St. Perpetua of Carthage and Her Companions, Martyrs	202	Mem
8	Edward King, Bishop, Teacher of the Faith	1910	Com
9	St. Gregory of Nyssa, Bishop, Teacher of the Faith	395	Mem
10	Robert Machray, Archbishop	1904	Com
17	St. Patrick, Missionary, Bishop	461	Mem
18	St. Cyril of Jerusalem, Bishop, Teacher of the Faith	386	Com
19	St. Joseph	n/a	HD
20	St. Cuthbert of Lindisfarne, Bishop, Missionary	687	Com
21	Thomas Cranmer, Abp of Canterbury, Martyr	1556	Com
22	Thomas Ken, Bishop	1711	Com
23	Gregory the Illuminator, Bishop	332	Com
25	The Annunciation of the Lord to the Blessed Virgin Mary	n/a	HD
27	Charles Henry Brent, Bishop	1929	Com
29	John Keble, Priest	1866	Com
31	John Donne, Priest, Poet	1631	Com

==== April ====
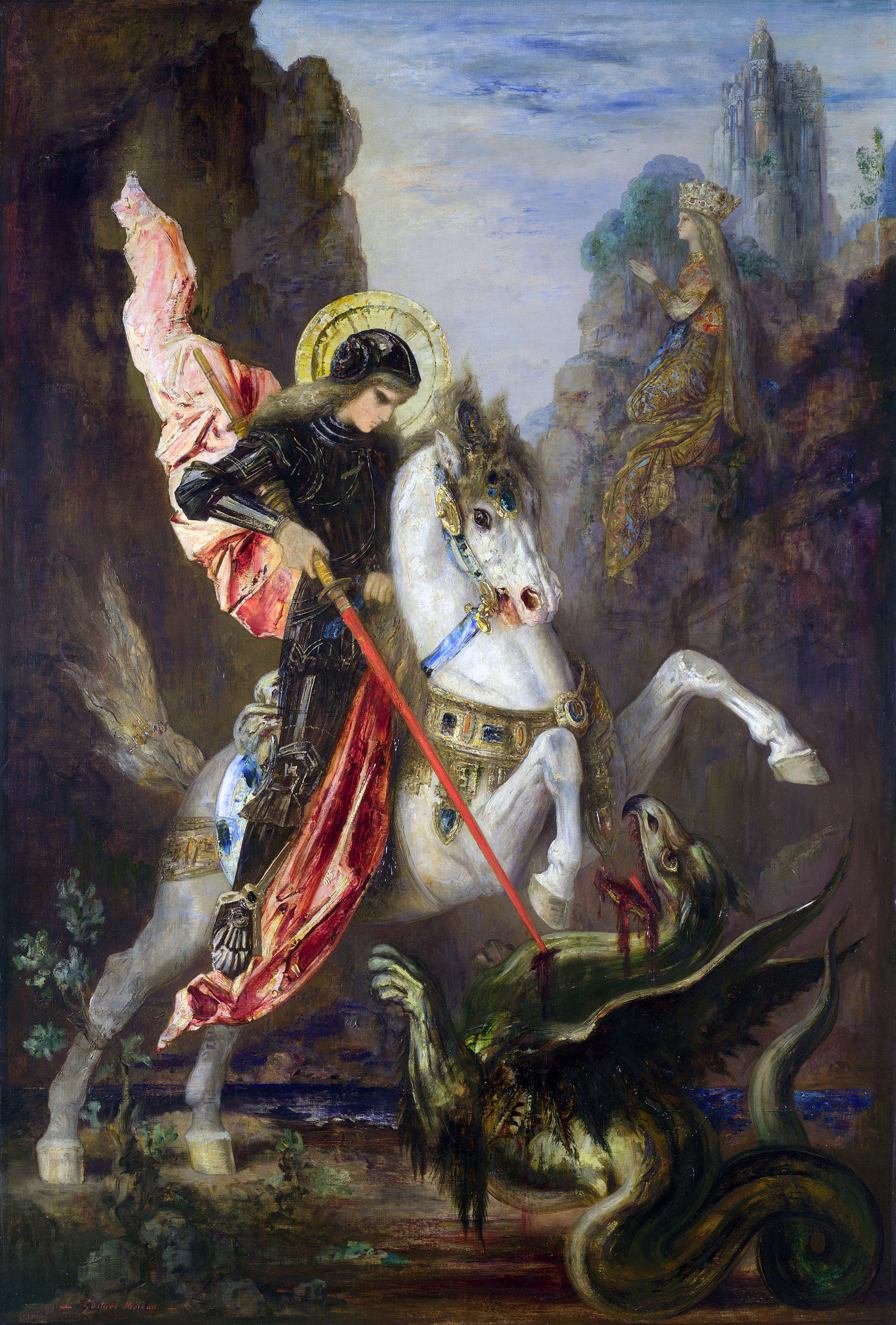
St George, commemorated April 23

Day	Commemoration	Year of death	Type^{1}
1	Frederick Denison Maurice, Priest	1872	Com
2	Henry Budd, Priest	1875	Com
3	St. Richard of Chichester, Bishop	1253	Com
4	Reginald Heber, Bishop	1826	Com
5	Emily Ayckbowm, Religious^{2}	1900	Mem
9	William Law, Priest	1761	Com
11	George Augustus Selwyn, Bishop, Missionary	1878	Com
16	Mollie Brant, Matron	1796	Com
21	St. Anselm of Canterbury, Abp of Canterbury, Teacher of the Faith	1109	Mem
23	St. George	4th Century	Com
24	Martyrs of the Twentieth Century	n/a	Mem
25	St. Mark the Evangelist	n/a	HD
29	St. Catherine of Siena, Religious	1380	Mem
30	Marie of the Incarnation, Religious, Educator	1672	Com

==== May ====
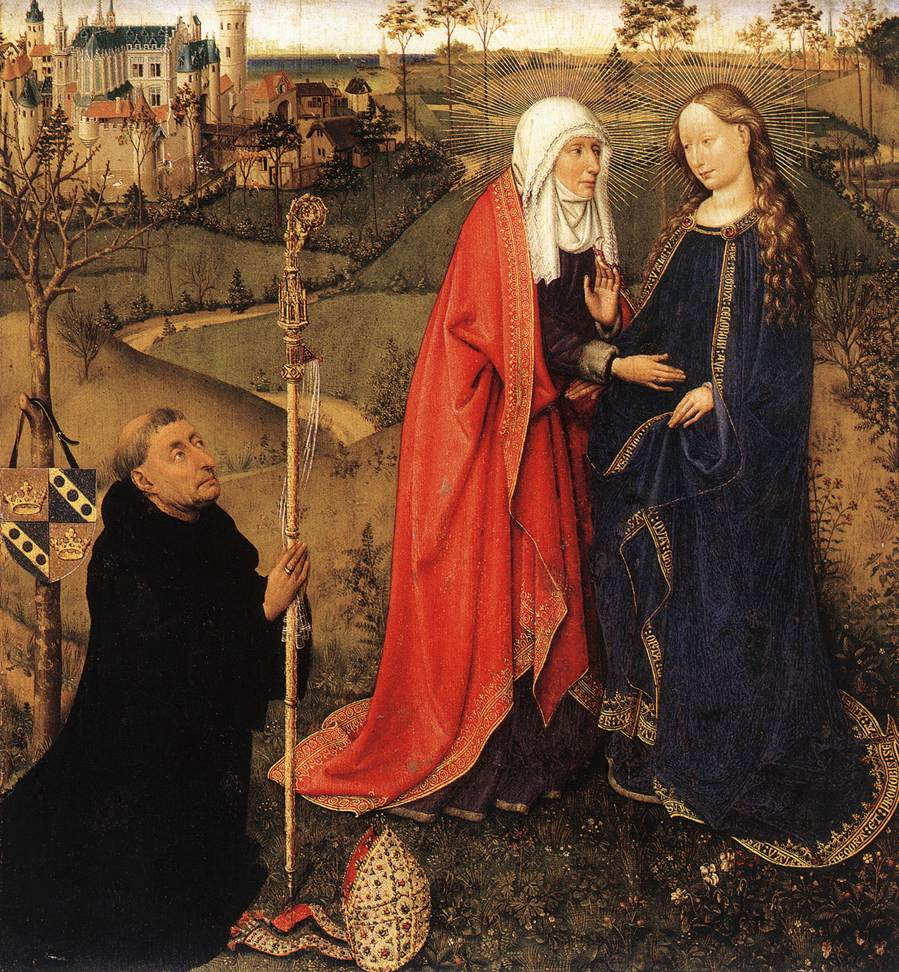
The Visit of the Blessed Virgin Mary, commemorated May 31 on the new calendar

Day	Commemoration	Year of death	Type^{1}
1	Philip and James, Apostles	n/a	HD
6 (or Dec 27)	John the Evangelist	n/a	HD
8	Julian of Norwich, Spiritual Teacher	c. 1417	Com
12	Florence Nightingale, Nurse, Social Reformer	1910	Com
14	St. Matthias the Apostle	n/a	HD
19	St. Dunstan of Canterbury, Abp of Canterbury	988	Com
25	Bede, Priest, Religious, Scholar, Teacher of the Faith	735	Com
26	St. Augustine of Canterbury, Abp of Canterbury	605	Mem
27	John Charles Roper, Bishop	1940	Com
30	Roberta Elizabeth Tilton, Founder of the Anglican Church Women	1925	Com
31	Visit of the Blessed Virgin Mary to Elizabeth	n/a	HD

==== June ====
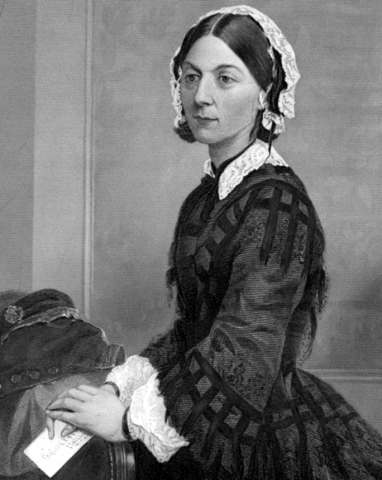
Florence Nightingale, commemorated May 12

Day	Commemoration	Year of death	Type^{1}
1	St. Justin, Martyr, Teacher of the Faith	c. 167	Mem
2	Martyrs of Lyon	177	Com
3	Martyrs of Uganda and Janani Luwum, Archbishop, Martyr	1886, 1977	Mem
4	St. John XXIII, Bishop, Reformer	1963	Com
5	St. Boniface, Archbishop, Martyr	754	Mem
6	William Grant Broughton, Bishop	1853	Com
9	St. Columba, Abbot, Missionary	597	Mem
11	St. Barnabas the Apostle	n/a	HD
16	Joseph Butler, Bishop, Teacher of the Faith	1752	Com
18	Bernard Mizeki, Catechist, Martyr	1896	Mem
22	St. Alban, Martyr	c. 209	Mem
24	Nativity of St. John the Baptist	n/a	HD
28	St. Irenaeus, Bishop, Teacher of the Faith	c. 202	Mem
29	St. Peter and St. Paul, Apostles	n/a	HD

==== July ====
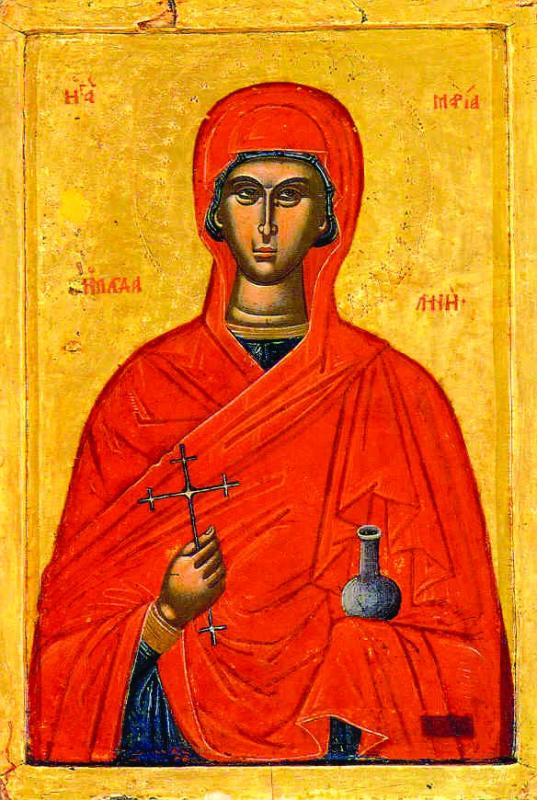
Mary Magdalene, commemorated July 22

Day	Commemoration	Year of death	Type^{1}
3	St. Thomas the Apostle	n/a	HD
6	Thomas More	1535	Com
11	St. Benedict of Nursia, Abbot	547	Mem
13	St. Henry of Finland, Bishop, Missionary	1156	Com
22	St. Mary Magdalene, Apostle to the Apostles	n/a	HD
25	James the Apostle	n/a	HD
26	St. Anne, Mother of the BVM	n/a	Com
29	William Wilberforce, Social Reformer	1833	Com

==== August ====
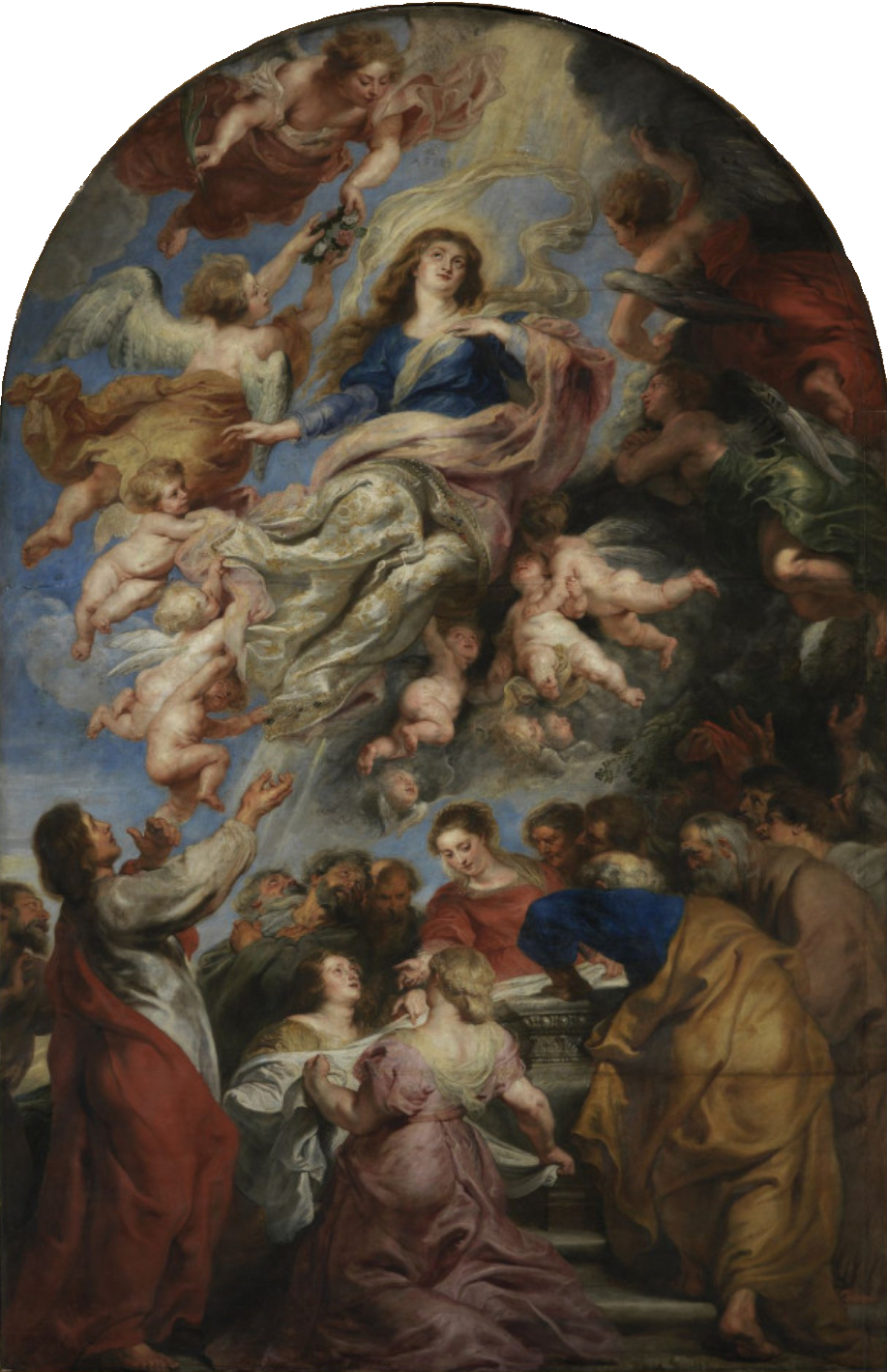
St. Mary the Virgin, August 15, the traditional date of her Dormition and one of six Marian feasts in the calendar

Day	Commemoration	Year of death	Type^{1}
3 (or Dec 26)	St. Stephen, Deacon, Martyr	n/a	HD
6	The Transfiguration of the Lord	n/a	HD
7	John Mason Neale, Priest	1866	Com
8	St. Dominic, Priest, Friar	1221	Mem
10	St. Laurence, Deacon, Martyr	258	Mem
11	St. Clare of Assisi, Abbess	1253	Mem
12	The Consecration of Charles Inglis (1787)	n/a	Com
13	Jeremy Taylor, Bishop, Spiritual Teacher	1667	Mem
14	Dietrich Bonhoeffer and Maximilian Kolbe, Martyrs	1945, 1941	Com
15	St. Mary the Virgin	n/a	HD
16	Holy Women of the Old Testament	n/a	Mem
17	John Stuart, Priest, Missionary	1811	Com
20	St. Bernard of Clairvaux, Abbot	1153	Mem
24	St. Bartholemew the Apostle	n/a	HD
27	St. Monnica, Matron	387	Com
28	St. Augustine of Hippo, Bishop, Teacher of the Faith	430	Mem
29	The Beheading of John the Baptist	n/a	HD
30	Robert McDonald, Priest, Missionary	1913	Com
31	St. Aidan, Bishop, Missionary	651	Com

==== September ====
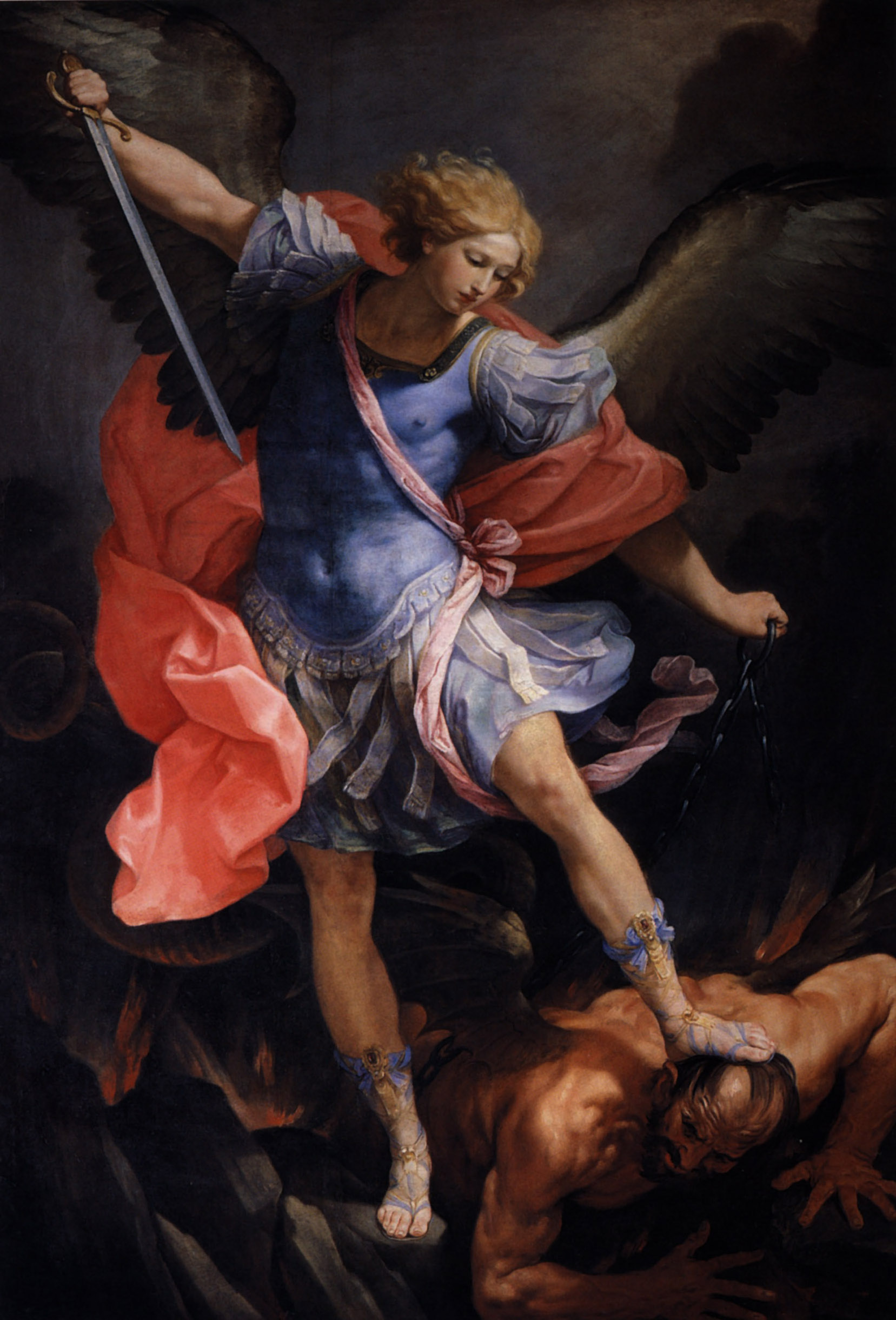
St. Michael the Archangel, commemorated on September 29

Day	Commemoration	Year of death	Type^{1}
2	Martyrs of New Guinea	1942	Mem
3	St. Gregory the Great, Bishop, Teacher of the Faith	604	Mem
4	First Anglican Eucharist in Canada (1578)	n/a	Com
8	The Nativity of the Blessed Virgin Mary	n/a	Mem
10	Edmund James Peck, Priest, Missionary	1924	Mem
13	St. Cyprian of Carthage, Bishop, Martyr	258	Mem
14	Holy Cross Day	n/a	HD
16	St. Ninian, Bishop	c. 430	Mem
18	Founders, Benefactors, and Missionaries of the Anglican Church of Canada	n/a	Mem
19	Theodore of Tarsus, Abp of Canterbury	690	Com
20	John Coleridge Patteson (Bishop) and His Companions, Martyrs	1871	Com
21	St. Matthew the Evangelist	n/a	HD
25	St. Sergius of Zagorsk, Abbot, Spiritual Teacher	1392	Com
26	Lancelot Andrewes, Bishop	1626	Com
29	St. Michael and All Angels	n/a	HD
30	St Jerome, Teacher of the Faith	420	Mem

==== October ====
James Hannington, commemorated October 29

Day	Commemoration	Year of death	Type^{1}
4	St. Francis of Assisi, Friar, Spiritual Teacher	1226	Mem
10	St. Paulinus of York, Bishop, Missionary	644	Com
13	St. Edward the Confessor, King	1066	Com
15	St. Teresa of Avila, Religious, Spiritual Teacher, Reformer	1582	Com
15	St. John of the Cross, Priest, Spiritual Teacher	1591	Com
17	St. Ignatius of Antioch, Bishop, Martyr	c. 115	Mem
18	St. Luke the Evangelist	n/a	HD
19	Jean de Brébeuf, Isaac Jogues and Their Companions, Missionaries and Martyrs	1642–1649	Mem
23	James of Jerusalem	c. 62	Mem
26	Alfred the Great, King	899	Com
28	St. Simon and St. Jude, Apostles	n/a	HD
29	James Hannington (Bishop) and His Companions, Martyrs	1885	Com
30	John Wyclyf, Priest, Reformer	1384	Com
30	Jan Hus, Priest, Reformer	1415	Com
31	Saints of the Reformation Era	n/a	Com

==== November ====
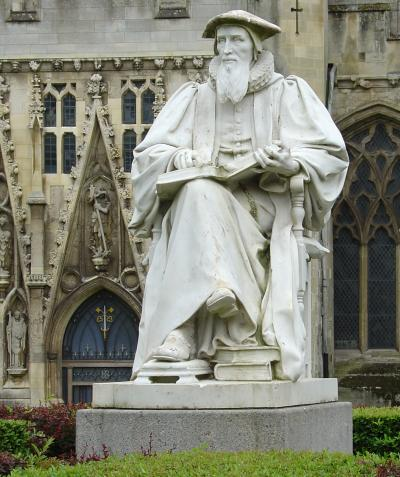
Richard Hooker, commemorated November 3

Day	Commemoration	Year of death	Type^{1}
1	All Saints Day	n/a	PF
2	All Souls Day	n/a	Mem
3	Richard Hooker, Priest, Teacher of the Faith	1600	Com
4	Saints of the Old Testament	n/a	Mem
7	St. Willibrord, Religious, Archbishop	739	Com
10	Leo the Great, Bishop, Teacher of the Faith	461	Mem
11	St. Martin of Tours, Abbot, Bishop	397	Mem
12	Charles Simeon, Priest	1836	Com
14	The Consecration of Samuel Seabury (1784)	n/a	Com
16	St. Margaret of Scotland, Queen, Reformer	1093	Com
17	St. Hugh of Lincoln, Bishop	1200	Com
18	St. Hilda of Whitby, Abbess	680	Com
19	St. Elizabeth of Hungary, Reformer	1231	Com
20	St. Edmund the Martyr, King, Martyr	870	Com
23	St. Clement of Rome, Bishop	c. 100	Com
30	St. Andrew the Apostle	n/a	HD

==== December ====
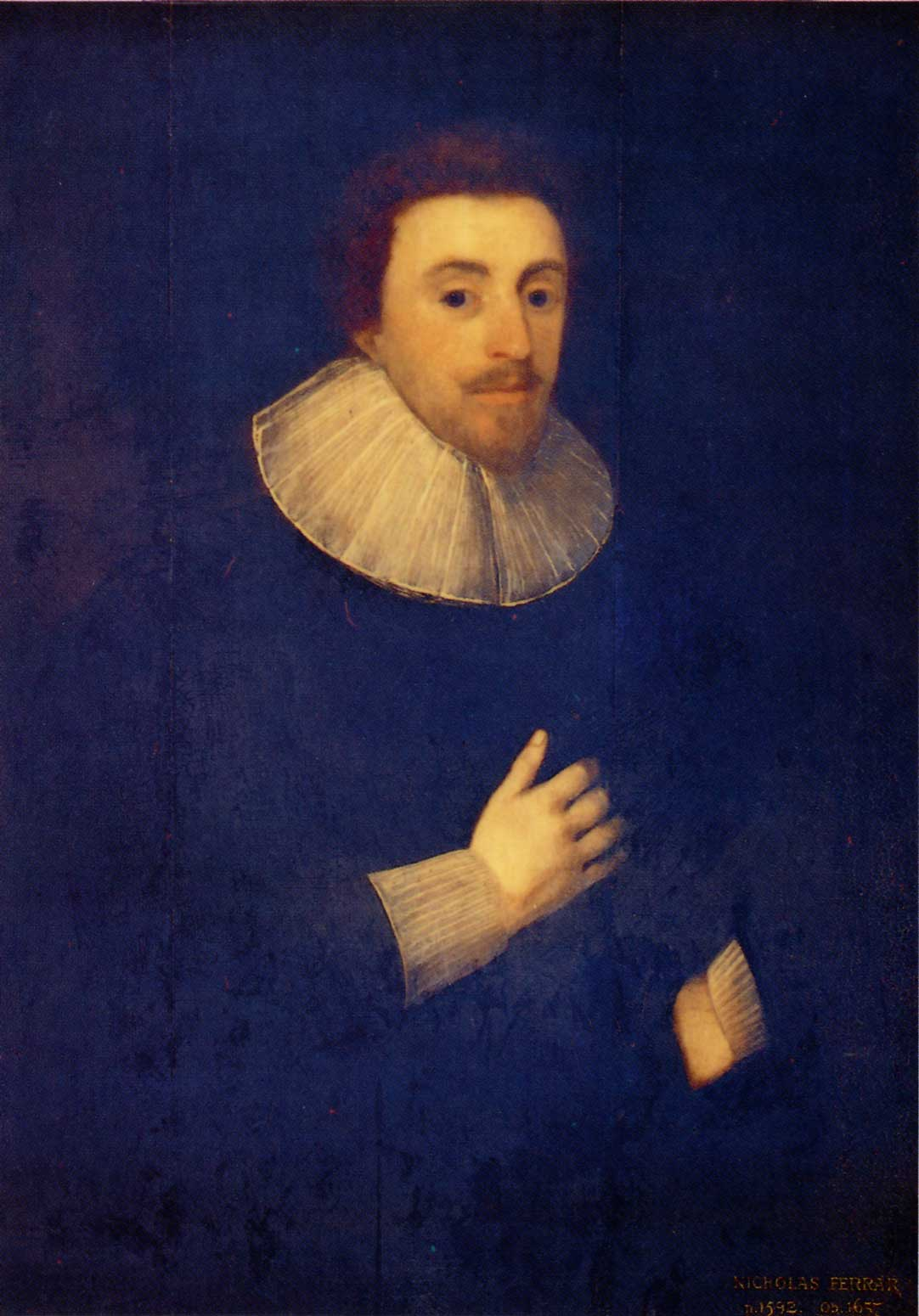
Nicholas Ferrar, commemorated December 4

Day	Commemoration	Year of death	Type^{1}
3	Francis Xavier, Missionary	1552	Com
4	Nicholas Ferrar, Deacon and the Community of Little Gidding	1637	Com
5	St. Clement of Alexandria, Priest, Teacher of the Faith	c. 210	Com
6	Saint Nicholas of Myra, Bishop	c. 342	Com
7	St. Ambrose of Milan, Bishop, Teacher of the Faith	397	Mem
8	The Conception of the Blessed Virgin Mary	n/a	Mem
9	Prophets of the Old Testament	n/a	Mem
14	Simon Gibbons, Priest, Missionary	1896	Com
25	The Nativity of our Lord	n/a	PF
29	St. Thomas Becket, Abp of Canterbury, Martyr	1170	Com
31	John West, Priest, Missionary	1845	Com

^{1}PF: Principal Feast; HD: Holy Day; Mem: Memorial; Com: Commemoration
^{2}Added to the calendar by resolution of the Council of General Synod, May, 2005.

== Book of Common Prayer Calendar ==
=== The calendar ===
The calendar of the Prayer Book stipulates: "When two lesser commemorations fall on the same day and it is desired to remember both, it is recommended that one of them be transferred to the nearest day before or after for which no special provision has been made."

==== January ====
- 1 The Octave Day of Christmas and Circumcision of our Lord, being New Year's Day.
- 6 The Epiphany of our Lord with commemoration of his Baptism in the Octave.
- 10 William Laud, Archbishop of Canterbury, Martyr 1645.
- 12 Benedict Biscop, Abbot and Scholar, 689.
  - John Horden, Missionary, first Anglican Bishop of Moosonee, 1893.
- 13 The Octave Day of the Epiphany.
  - Hilary, Doctor, Bishop of Poitiers, France, 368.
- 19 Henry, Missionary, Bishop in Finland, 1150.
- 21 (Agnes, Virgin and Martyr, Rome, c. 304.)
- 22 Vincent, Deacon and Martyr, Spain, c. 304.
- 24 St Timothy and St Titus, Apostolic men.
- 25 The Conversion of St Paul.
- 26 Polycarp, Bishop of Smyrna, Apostolic man, Martyr 155 or 156.
- 27 John Chrysostom, Doctor, Bishop of Constantinople, 407.
- 30 Charles Stuart, King, beheaded 1649.

==== February ====
- 2 The Presentation of Christ in the Temple, and the Purification of the Blessed Virgin Mary.
- 3 Anskar, Missionary, first Bishop in Sweden, 864.
- 11 Cædmon, first recorded Christian Poet in England, c. 680.
- 14 (Valentine, Bishop and Martyr.)
- 23 Lindel Tsen, Bishop in China, consecrated 1929; and Paul Sasaki, Bishop in Japan, consecrated 1935.
- 24 St Matthias the Apostle.
- 27 George Herbert, Pastor and Poet, 1633.

==== March ====
- 1 St David of Wales, Archbishop of Menevia, c. 544.
- 2 Chad, Missionary and first Bishop of Lichfield, 672.
  - John Wesley, Preacher, 1791; Charles Wesley, Poet, 1788.
- 6 Perpetua and her companions, Martyrs, Africa, 203.
- 7 Thomas Aquinas, Doctor and Poet, 1274.
- 12 Gregory the Great, Doctor, Bishop of Rome, 604.
- 17 St Patrick of Ireland, Missionary and Bishop, 461.
- 19 St Joseph of Nazareth, Spouse of the Blessed Virgin Mary.
  - Thomas Ken, Bishop of Bath and Wells, Poet, 1711.
- 20 Cuthbert, Missionary, Bishop of Lindisfarne, 687.
- 21 Benedict, Abbot of Monte Cassino, Italy, c. 540.
  - Thomas Cranmer, Translator and Reviser of the Liturgy, Archbishop of Canterbury, Martyr 1556.
- 25 The Annunciation of the Blessed Virgin Mary.
- 29 John Keble of Oxford, Scholar and Poet, 1866.

==== April ====
- 2 Henry Budd, first North American Indian to be ordained to the ministry, 1850.
- 3 Richard, Bishop of Chichester, 1253.
  - Reginald Heber, Bishop in India, Poet, 1826.
- 4 Ambrose, Doctor and Poet, Bishop of Milan, 397.
- 11 Leo the Great, Doctor, Bishop of Rome, 461.
- 19 Alphege, Archbishop of Canterbury, Martyr 1012.
- 21 Anselm, Doctor, Archbishop of Canterbury, 1109.
- 23 St George of England, Martyr c. 304.
- 25 St Mark the Evangelist

==== May ====
- 1 St Philip and St James, Apostles.
- St James the Brother of the Lord, Martyr 62.
- 2 Athanasius, Doctor, Bishop of Alexandria, 373.
- 4 Monnica, the mother of Augustine of Hippo, 387.
- 9 Gregory of Nazianzus, Doctor, Bishop of Constantinople, 389.
- 11 Cyril and Methodius, Missionaries to the Slavs, 885.
- 12 Florence Nightingale, Nurse, 1910.
- 19 Dunstan, Archbishop of Canterbury, 988.
- 20 The Council of Nicaea, 325.
- 25 Aldhelm, Bishop of Sherborne, Scholar and Poet, 709.
- 26 Augustine, Missionary, first Archbishop of Canterbury 597–605.
- 27 Bede, Presbyter, Doctor and Historian, 735.
- 30 Joan of Arc, 1431.

==== June ====
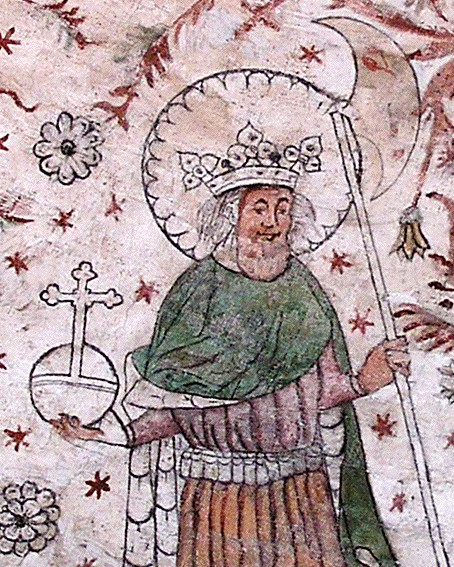
Olav II, July 29 (BCP)

- 1 Justin Martyr, Doctor, c. 165.
- 5 Boniface, Missionary, Bishop of Mainz, Germany, Martyr 754.
- 9 Columba, Abbot of Iona: Ireland and Scotland, 597.
- 11 St Barnabas the Apostle.
- 14 Basil the Great, Doctor, Bishop of Caesarea, Cappadocia, 379.
- 22 Alban, first recorded Martyr in Britain, c. 304.
- 24 The Nativity of St John the Baptist.
- 28 Irenaeus, Doctor, Bishop of Lyon, France, c. 200.
- 29 St Peter and St Paul the Apostles, Martyrs c. 64.

==== July ====
- 1 The Octave Day of St John the Baptist.
  - Confederation of Canada, 1867: Dominion Day.
- 2 The Visitation of the Blessed Virgin Mary to Elizabeth.
- 6 The Octave Day of St Peter and St Paul.
  - Thomas More, Chancellor of England, Martyr 1535.
- 9 Stephen Langton, Archbishop of Canterbury, 1228.
- 15 Swithun, Bishop of Winchester, c. 862.
- 20 (Margaret, Virgin and Martyr, Antioch of Pisidia.)
- 22 St Mary Magdalene.
- 25 St James the Apostle, Martyr 44.
- 26 (St Anne, the mother of the Blessed Virgin Mary.)
- 29 Olaf, King of Norway, Martyr 1030.
  - William Wilberforce, Emancipator of the Slaves, 1833.

==== August ====
- 1 Lammas Day.
  - The Maccabean Martyrs.
- 5 Oswald, King of Northumbria, Martyr 641.
- 6 The Transfiguration of our Lord.
- 7 The Name of Jesus.
- 10 Laurence, Archdeacon of Rome, Martyr 258.
- 12 Charles Inglis, first Anglican Bishop in Canada, consecrated 1787.
- 13 Hippolytus, Doctor, Bishop in Rome, Martyr 235.
  - Jeremy Taylor, Bishop of Down, Ireland, 1667.
- 15 The Falling Asleep of the Blessed Virgin Mary.
- 20 Bernard, Abbot of Clairvaux, France, Doctor and Poet, 1153.
- 24 St Bartholomew the Apostle.
- 28 Augustine, Doctor, Bishop of Hippo, Africa, 430.
  - Robert McDonald, Missionary in the Western Arctic, 1913.
- 29 The Beheading of St John the Baptist.
- 31 Aidan, Missionary, Bishop of Lindisfarne, 651.

==== September ====
- 1 Giles, Abbot, southern France, c. 720.
- 3 Robert Wolfall, Presbyter. First recorded Anglican Communion Service in Canada, Frobisher Bay, 1578.
- 8 The Nativity of the Blessed Virgin Mary.
- 10 Edmund James Peck, Missionary to the Eskimo, 1924.
- 13 Cyprian, Doctor, Bishop of Carthage, Martyr 258.
  - First General Synod of the Anglican Church of Canada, 1893.
- 14 Holy Cross Day.
- 16 Ninian, Missionary, first Bishop in Galloway, Scotland, c. 430.
- 19 Theodore of Tarsus, Archbishop of Canterbury, 690.
- 20 John Coleridge Patteson, Missionary, first Bishop of Melanesia, Martyr 1871.
- 21 St Matthew the Apostle and Evangelist.
- 25 Lancelot Andrewes, Bishop of Winchester, Translator of the Scriptures, 1626.
- 29 St Michael and All Angels.
- 30 Jerome, Doctor, Presbyter in Rome and Bethlehem, Translator of the Scriptures, 420.

==== October ====
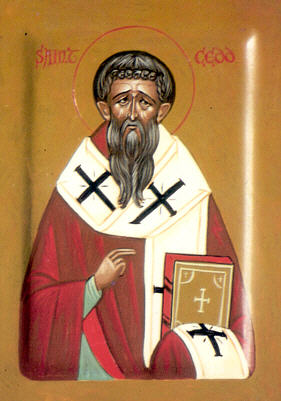
Cedd October 26 (BCP)

- 1 Remigius, Bishop of Reims, France, c. 530.
- 4 Francis of Assisi, 1226.
- 6 William Tyndale, Translator of the Scriptures into English, Martyr 1536.
- 9 St. Denis of France, first Bishop of Paris, Martyr 272.
  - Robert Grosseteste, Scholar, Bishop of Lincoln, 1253.
- 10 Paulinus, Missionary, Archbishop of York, 644.
- 11 St. Philip of Caesarea, Apostolic man.
- 13 Edward the Confessor, King, Westminster, 1066.
- 16 Hugh Latimer and Nicholas Ridley, Bishops, Martyrs 1555.
- 17 Etheldreda, or Audrey, Queen, Abbess of Ely, 679.
- 18 St Luke the Evangelist.
- 25 (Crispin and Crispinian, Martyrs 285.)
- 26 Cedd, Missionary, Bishop of the East Saxons, 664.
  - Alfred, King of the West Saxons, 899.
- 28 St Simon the Zealot and St Jude, the Apostles.
  - St Jude the Brother of the Lord.
- 29 James Hannington, Missionary and Bishop, Martyr 1885.

==== November ====
- 1 All Saints.
- 2 All Souls: Commemoration of the Faithful Departed.
  - Richard Hooker, Doctor of the Church of England, 1600.
- 7 Willibrord, Missionary, Bishop of Utrecht, the Netherlands, 739.
- 8 The Octave Day of All Saints:
  - The Founders, Benefactors, and Missionaries of the Church in Canada.
- 11 Martin, Bishop of Tours, France, c. 397.
- 13 Charles Simeon of Cambridge, Pastor, 1836.
- 16 Hugh, Bishop of Lincoln, 1200.
  - Margaret, Queen of Scotland, 1093.
- 17 Hilda, Abbess of Whitby, 680.
- 20 Edmund, King of East Anglia, Martyr 870.
- 22 (Cecilia, Virgin and Martyr, Rome.)
- 23 Clement, Apostolic man, Bishop of Rome, c. 100.
- 25 (Catherine, Virgin and Martyr, Alexandria.)
- 30 St Andrew the Apostle.

==== December ====
- 4 Clement of Alexandria, Doctor, c. 210.
- 6 (Nicolas, Bishop of Myra, c. 342.)
- 8 The Conception of the Blessed Virgin Mary.
- 16 O Sapientia.
- 17 Ignatius, Bishop of Antioch, Martyr in Rome c. 115.
- 21 St Thomas the Apostle.
- 25 The Nativity of our Lord: Christmas Day.
- 26 St Stephen the Martyr.
- 27 St John the Apostle and Evangelist.
- 28 The Innocents.
- 29 Thomas Becket, Archbishop of Canterbury, 1170.
- 30 John Wycliffe of Oxford, Scholar, Translator of the Scriptures into English, 1384.
- 31 John West, Missionary, Red River, Canada, 1845.

=== Differences between the BCP and BAS ===
==== Changed dates of observation ====
- Ambrose: From April 4 to December 7
- Lancelot Andrewes: From September 25 to September 26
- Thomas Aquinas: From March 7 to January 28
- Basil the Great: From June 14 to January 2
- Bede: From May 27 to May 25
- Benedict: From March 21 to July 11
- Clement of Alexandria: From December 4 to December 5
- Cyril and Methodius: From May 11 to February 14
- Founders, Benefactors, and Missionaries of the Church in Canada: From November 8 to September 18
- Gregory the Great: From March 12 to September 3
- Gregory of Nazianzus: From May 9 to January 2
- Reginald Heber: From April 3 to April 4
- Hilda of Whitby: From November 17 to November 18
- Richard Hooker: From November 2 to November 3
- Hugh of Lincoln: From November 16 to November 17
- Henry of Finland: From January 13 to July 13
- Ignatius of Antioch: From December 17 to October 17
- James of Jerusalem: From May 1 to October 23
- Thomas Ken: From March 19 to March 22
- Leo the Great: From April 11 to November 10
- Robert McDonald: From August 28 to August 30
- Monnica: From May 4 to August 27
- Name of Jesus From August 7 to January 1 (as the Naming of Jesus)
- Charles Simeon: From November 13 to November 12
- Thomas the Apostle: From December 21 to July 3
- John and Charles Wesley: From March 2 to March 3
- John Wyclyf: From December 30 to October 30
- Visit of the Blessed Virgin Mary to Elizabeth: July 2 to May 31

==== Deletions ====
- Aldhelm, Bishop, Scholar, and Poet, 709 (May 25)
- Alphege, Abp of Canterbury, Martyr, 1012 (April 19)
- First General Synod of the Anglican Church of Canada, 1893 (September 13)
- Benedict Biscop, Abbot and Scholar, 689 (January 12)
- Cædmon, Poet, 680 (February 11)
- Catherine of Alexandria, Virgin, Martyr, 305 (November 25)
- Cecilia, Virgin, Martyr, c. 180 (November 22)
- Cedd, Missionary, Bishop, 664 (October 26)
- Crispin and Crispinian, Martyrs, 285 (October 25)
- Denis, Bishop, Martyr, 272 (October 9)
- Ethelreda, Queen, Abbess, 679 (October 17)
- Giles, Abbot, 720 (Sept. 1)
- Robert Grosseteste, Scholar, Bishop, 1253 (October 9)
- Hippolyte of Antioch, Bishop, Teacher of the Faith, Martyr, 235 (August 13)
- Joan of Arc, Martyr, 1431 (May 30)
- Lammas Day (August 1)
- Stephen Langton, Abp of Canterbury, 1228 (July 9)
- Hugh Latimer and Nicholas Ridley, Bishops, Martyrs, 1555 (October 16)
- Maccabean Martyrs (August 1)
- Margaret of Antioch, Virgin and Martyr, 304 (July 20)
- The First Council of Nicea, 325 (May 20)
- O Sapientia (December 16)
- Olaf of Norway, Martyr, 1030 (July 29)
- Oswald of Northumbria, Martyr, 641 (August 5)
- Philip of Caesarea, Deacon, 1st Cy. (October 11)
- Remigius, Bishop, 530 (October 1)
- Swithun, Bishop, 862 (July 15)
- William Tyndale, Educator, Martyr, 1536 (October 6)
- St. Valentine, Bishop and Martyr (February 14)
