= James Settee =

The Reverend James Settee Sr.

Personal details
- Born: circa 1809 Split Lake, Manitoba
- Died: 19 March 1902 Winnipeg

James Settee (circa 1809 - 19 March 1902), was of Swampy Cree descent. He was given the name James Settee when he was baptized in 1827. He was the second Native American ordained an Anglican priest; following Henry Budd. He married Sarah (Sally) Cook in 1835. He was ordained an Anglican priest and spent his career ministering to First Nations people of Canada. He was fluent in English, Cree and Ojibwe.

== Early life ==
James Settee was born near Split Lake, Manitoba. Settee left Split Lake in 1824 at eight years of age and went to the Church Missionary Society (CMS) school, which had been established by the Revd. John West in what was then known as the Red River Colony in what is now the province of Manitoba. He attended school with Henry Budd and Charles Pratt (Askenootow). He was baptized by the Revd. David Thomas Jones in 1827.

== Missionary work ==
Settee began working with the Revd. William Cockran at the CMS missions at St. Peter’s (Dynevor) and Nettle (Netley) Creek. During the winter of 1841–42 Settee was sent to the Beaver (Weatherald) Creek–Moose Mountain region of Saskatchewan as a missionary to a band of Cree-Assiniboine of the Southern Plains Cree, However Settee, as a northern Swampy Cree, lacked kinship and language ties with the Southern Plains Cree and the mission ended in 1845.

In June 1846 the Revd Robert Hunter sent James Settee as catechist to establish to the mission station on the shore of Lac la Ronge; and provided Settee with flour, pemican, clothes, tools, and everything he was likely to want until the following spring, he set out early in June, and in about three weeks arrived at his destination.

In 1849, Settee moved the mission to Potato River, where he was joined by the Revd. Robert Hunt. In 1850 Settee was visited at the mission station by Dr. David Anderson the first Bishop of Rupert's Land, and Henry Budd. In about October 1852 Hunt move the mission to the shore of the Churchill River and it was renamed the Stanley Mission.

Bishop Anderson enrolled Settee at St John’s Collegiate School in 1853. He was ordained deacon on Christmas Day 1853 in St John’s Church, Winnipeg. In July 1854, Settee and the Revd. William Stagg were sent to the Fairford Mission in the Swan River district near Lake Manitoba. Settee was ordained by Bishop Anderson at St John’s on 1 January 1856.

The Qu'Appelle Mission was established by James Settee in May 1858 on the Qu'Appelle River in the region of the Fishing Lakes and the Touchwood Hills of Saskatchewan in the land of the Southern Plains Cree. Again he experience problems in working with the Southern Plains Cree and the mission ended in 1859. He visited the Qu’Appelle district in 1861 and 1865, and the Touchwood Hills in 1861, 1862 and 1865.

In 1867 Settee was sent to the Swan River district until he was superseded by the Revd. D. B. Hale and transferred later that year to Scanterbury in Manitoba. Between 1867 and 1879 he served at the missions at Mapleton, Netley Creek, Lake Winnipeg, and Nelson River Island and early 1881 he was in Prince Albert, Saskatchewan. From 1883 to 1884 he was at The Pas as the Revd. Joseph Reader, had fallen under the influence of the Plymouth Brethren so that the Anglican mission need to be reinforced. In 1884 he returned to Prince Albert until he retired later that year.

He died on 19 March 1902 in Winnipeg and was buried in St John’s cemetery.

== Legacy ==
The James Settee College in Prince Albert trains the majority of the indigenous clergy who serve in the Diocese of Saskatchewan.
