= Henry Budd =

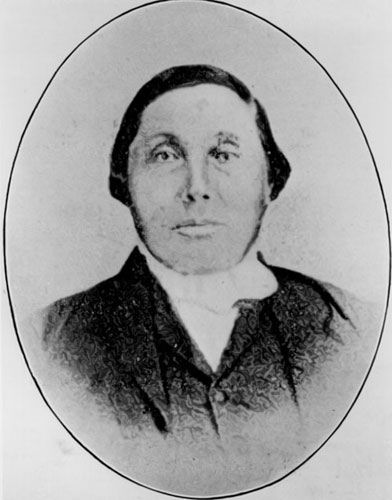
- The Revd Henry Budd

Reverend
- Born: circa 1812; Norway House, Rupert's Land
- Died: April 2, 1875; The Pas, Manitoba
- Venerated in: Anglican Church of Canada
- Feast: 2 April, 22 December

Henry Budd (circa 1812 – April 2, 1875), the first Native American ordained an Anglican priest, spent his career ministering to First Nations people. He is not to be confused with Henry Budd, a wealthy Englishman.

== Early life ==
Born to Cree parents in Norway House in what was then the Red River Colony, the youth originally named Sakachuwescam was baptised and renamed Henry Budd, after his own mentor the Rev. Henry Budd, by Anglican missionary the Rev. John West in 1822. He attended the Church Missionary Society (CMS) school, which West had established in what was then known as the Red River Colony in what is now the province of Manitoba. Fellow students included James Settee and Charles Pratt (Askenootow).

Raised and educated by missionaries including West, George Harbridge and David Jones, Budd returned to the Lower Church District (later St. Andrew's) to assist his mother and sister-in-law in 1828. He took a job with the Hudson's Bay Company (HBC) and ultimately married Betsy Work, daughter of a company factor. Upon completing his HBC contract, Budd and his wife bought a farm near the Red River's great rapids (a/k/a St. Andrew's). They had six children, Henry, John, Elizabeth and 3 other daughters.

== Career ==
In September 1830, Henry Budd began studying for ordination under West, although he would not be ordained deacon for two more decades. In 1837, Budd began teaching at the St. John's church school. In 1840, missionaries John Smithurst and William Cockran asked Budd to help them establish a mission to the Cree in the Cumberland House District. Budd, his wife and mother then moved to Paskoyac (later known as The Pas), where they worked with minimal church supervision until 1844. Budd tried to make the station self-supporting, introducing farming methods to the native peoples, who previously subsisted on hunting and fishing and supplemented their diet by trading furs to the Hudson's Bay Company. When English missionary James Hunter arrived at The Pas, Budd assisted him in learning the language and other matters.

Bishop David Anderson ordained Budd a deacon on December 22, 1850, and in 1853 ordained him a priest as well as consecrated Christ Church, which Budd had labored to build at The Pas during the previous decade, overcoming the initial opposition of the HBC factor as well as some local tribal leaders. After Hunter left in 1854, Budd continued using The Pas as a base until assigned to establish a mission at Fort a la Corne, also on the Saskatchewan River. The Church Missionary Society published some of his journals. Beginning in 1857, after training the Rev. Henry George to succeed him at The Pas, Budd moved north to the Nepowesin Mission, where he ministered to the Plains Cree of Manitoba and Saskatchewan for a decade. There in 1864–1865, a scarlet fever epidemic took the lives of his wife, eldest son and a daughter, so Budd sent three other children to live at Red River while he continued his work, hampered as well by injuries sustained falling off a horse.

In 1867, the local corresponding committee recommended that The Pas be reclassified from a missionary station (four successive English missionaries having complained of the lack of evangelistic compared to pastoral opportunities) to one requiring a native pastor. Despite misgivings about the mission's deterioration in his absence, and the lower salary he received compared to the white missionaries, Budd returned to The Pas.

== Death and legacy ==
Respected for his administrative abilities as well as his eloquence in Cree and English, Budd spent the last eight years of his life at The Pas. He succeeding in rebuilding the outpost, even though the local fur trade had collapsed. There he died of influenza in 1875 and despair not long after the death of another son in 1874. Two daughters survived Budd, and were taken care of by the Church Missionary Society.

Budd translated the Bible and the Book of Common Prayer into the Cree Language. According to his biography published in 1920, at least one First Nations Christian man recalls being more devastated by Budd's death than the passing of his own father.

The Canadian Calendar of Holy Persons of the Anglican Church of Canada remembers Budd on the anniversary of his death, April 2.

The Henry Budd College for Ministry, a theological college of the Diocese of Brandon for the development of First Nation, Métis and other persons for ministry, is located at The Pas.
