= Charles Pratt (Askenootow) =

Charles Cowley Pratt (c. 1816 – 1888), also known as Askenootow which means Worker of the earth in Cree, was an interpreter at the Treaty 4 negotiations at Fort Qu'Appelle in 1874 and 1875.

Pratt was born in about 1816 in the Qu'Appelle Valley, and was a member of a Cree-Assiniboine tribe. He attended the Church Missionary Society (CMS) school, which had been established by the Revd. John West in what was then known as the Red River Colony in what is now the province of Manitoba. He attended school with Henry Budd and James Settee. He was given the name Charles Pratt in 1823 after he was baptized into the Church of England. He then became a catechist and lay preacher for the Church of England. He also worked as a boatman for the Hudson's Bay Company.

Pratt went on to work as a school teacher on the Gordon Indian Reserve in 1876 until his death in 1888.
