= Samuel Matheson =

Canadian clergyman

Samuel Pritchard Matheson
- Primate of the Anglican Church of Canada
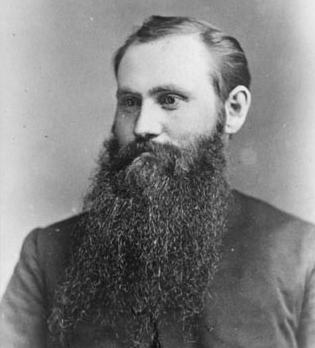
- In office: 1909 to 1930

Personal details
- Born: September 20, 1852 parish of Kildonan, Manitoba
- Died: May 19, 1942 (aged 89)

Samuel Pritchard Matheson (September 20, 1852 – May 19, 1942) was a Canadian clergyman, Archbishop of Rupert's Land, and fourth, as well as the longest-serving, Primate of the Anglican Church of Canada.

== Life ==
Born in the parish of Kildonan, Manitoba, the son of John and Catherine (Pritchard) Matheson, Matheson received a Bachelor of Divinity in 1879 from St. John's College, University of Manitoba, and a Doctor of Divinity degree in 1903. He was ordained a deacon in 1875 and a priest in 1876. He was Master of St. John's College and Professor of Exegetical Theology.

In 1882, he was made a Canon of St. John's Cathedral in Winnipeg and Dean of Rupert's Land in 1902. In 1905 he became Archbishop of Rupert's Land and in 1909 was elected Primate of the Anglican Church of Canada, serving until 1931. He resigned the Canadian primacy in September 1930 and his diocesan See on January 31, 1931.

Ordination history of Samuel Matheson

From 1908 to 1934, he was the 2nd Chancellor of the University of Manitoba. He founded Havergal Ladies' College in Winnipeg and was its president.

Anglican Communion titles
Preceded by Robert Machray	Metropolitan of Rupert's Land; 1907–1931	Succeeded by Isaac Stringer
Preceded by Arthur Sweatman	Primate of the Anglican Church of Canada; 1909–1930	Succeeded by Clarendon Worrell
Academic offices
Preceded by Robert Machray	Chancellor of the University of Manitoba; 1908–1934	Succeeded by John Dafoe
