= Alexander Christie (governor) =

Scottish fur trader

- Born: 1792; Glasgow, Scotland
- Died: December 9, 1872 (aged 79–80); Edinburgh, Scotland
- Occupation: Chief factor of Hudson's Bay Company
- Spouse: Anne Thomas
- Children: Alexander and William Joseph

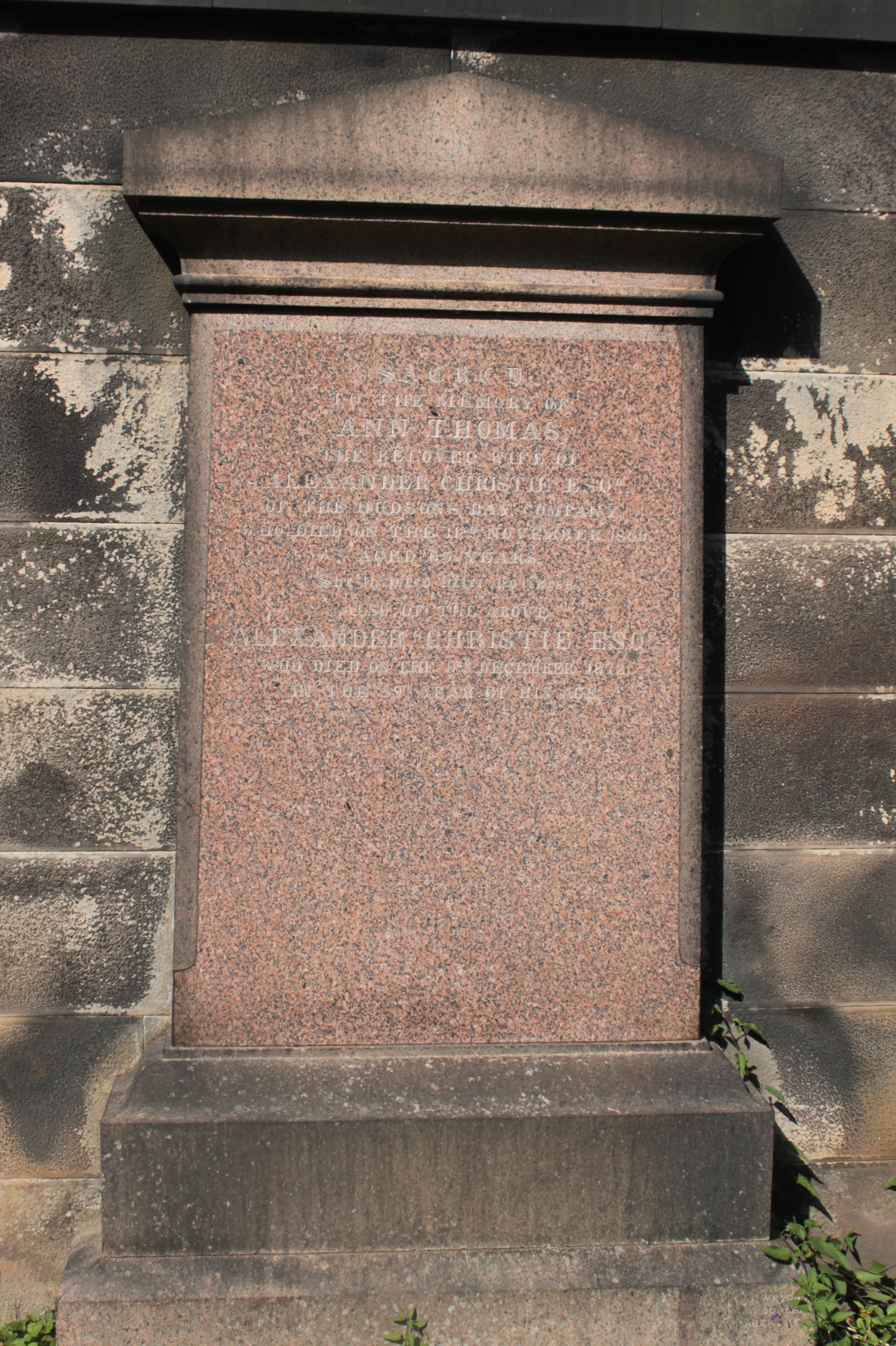
The grave of Alexander Christie, Grange Cemetery

Alexander Christie (1792 – December 9, 1872) was a Scottish fur trader and chief factor of the Red River Colony from 1833 to 1839 and from 1844 to 1848. Christie was instrumental in leading trading ceremonies on behalf of the Hudson's Bay Company (HBC) while he served in a role known as chief factor. When he retired, he received a half share in the company's profits for two years beyond the normal retirement period.

It is reported that Christie was born in Glasgow, Scotland in 1792. Christie had experience working in the lumber trade at Moose Factory before he joined the Hudson's Bay Company in 1809. Christie left for Britain briefly in 1810 but returned to Moose Factory in 1811 and established a sawmill. In 1817, now headquartered at Rupert's House, Christie was in charge of the Eastmain region, rising to the position of chief factor in 1821. Christie headed Moose Factory from 1826 to 1830, when he relocated to York Factory. In 1833, Christie was appointed to the position of Governor of the Red River Colony and the Assiniboia District, a position held until 1839. During this term, Christie managed the construction of Lower Fort Garry, which had begun prior to his appointment in 1831. Christie also initiated the establishment of Upper Fort Garry during this time. Between 1839 and 1844, Christie was again on furlough in England and at Moose Factory. From 1844 to 1848, Christie was involved in attempting to enforce the HBC fur-trading monopoly. Christie was unsuccessful due to a lack of military force.

Christie's marriage to Anne Thomas, daughter of John

Thomas, Sr., was confirmed by the Church of England on February 10, 1835. His sons, Alexander and William Joseph, and grandson, Alexander, entered the Hudson's Bay Company's service.[2] His son-in-law, John Black, was a chief trader at Red River.[4]

He retired to Edinburgh and had a house at 51 Minto Street. He died in Edinburgh, Scotland in 1872. He is buried with his wife Ann Thomas in Grange Cemetery in south Edinburgh. The grave lies against the north wall.
