= John West (missionary) =

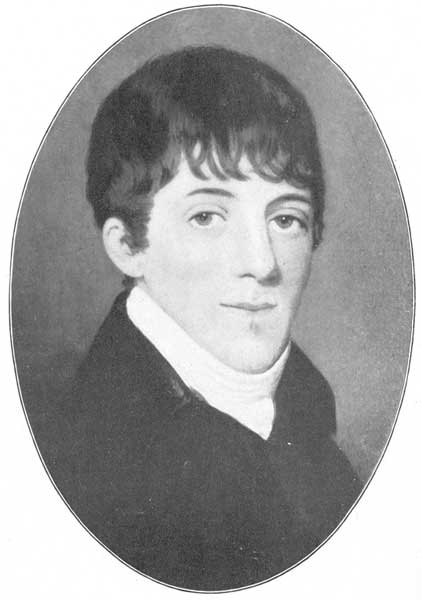
The Revd. John West

John West (November 1778–21 December 1845) was the first Anglican priest in Western Canada and a teacher, reformer and author. He was a missionary of the Church Missionary Society and a chaplain for the Hudson's Bay Company; the chapel he founded in Winnipeg became St John's Cathedral. Among his converts was Henry Budd, the first Native American ordained an Anglican priest.

== Early career ==
West was born in Farnham in Surrey in 1778, the son of George West, an Anglican clergyman, and his wife Ann (née Knowles). West became a deacon on 13 December 1804 and was ordained a priest on 21 September 1806. On 2 October 1807 he married Harriet Atkinson (1789–1839) in Wethersfield in Essex, and they had 12 children. He had matriculated at St Edmund Hall, Oxford in 1801, graduating BA in 1805 and with an MA on 8 June 1809.

After his ordination West was a curate in Essex, at Wethersfield and then Stebbing. There was a time in 1814 during which he was curate to the Rev. Henry Budd, Rector of White Roding, a mentor. Budd was an evangelical widower, and chaplain to the Bridewell Hospital. West went on to Lindsell. In 1818 he was at the Church of St Michael the Archangel, Aldershot in Hampshire as perpetual curate.

In early 1820 West was appointed Rector at Chettle in Dorset. However, he did not take up this appointment as he had already applied to the Church Missionary Society (CMS) to become a missionary, and West became the first chaplain to the Hudson's Bay Company in 1819 and was awaiting his first mission.

== Mission to Canada ==
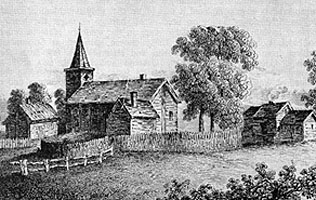
John West's first Church and School at Old Kildonan in Manitoba (1827)

The Hudson's Bay Company desired that all who came under its influence, including those HBC retirees who wished to remain in the country, orphaned mixed-race children and others associated with the Protestant community in the west would have their spiritual needs met by a chaplain in the company's employ. West's placement in Western Canada was also due to the Company's belief that a number of missionary societies would provide financial support if the missions included Indian children from the Red River region; to this aim West established the Red River Academy. West sailed to Rupert's Land in May 1820 with George Harbidge, a school teacher. The first Protestant missionary to visit that area, West travelled without his pregnant wife and small children, intending to fetch them once a mission was set up. At the Red River Settlement West located his mission three miles north of Fort Douglas; here he constructed a chapel, a school and residences for himself and his Indian pupils. The chapel would eventually come to be known as 'The Upper Church' and later as St John's Cathedral.

West decided that his best chance of spreading Christianity among the locals was through converting the children. In 1820 the CMS provided financial assistance to West for the education of local Native American children, including James Settee and a youth called Sakachuwescam of the Cree nation. After baptising the latter in 1822 West renamed him Henry Budd after his own mentor from his curacy in Essex. Budd attended the Church Missionary Society school which West had established in what was then known as the Red River Colony in what is now the province of Manitoba. Budd would become the first North American Indian to be ordained to the ministry, in 1850. In 1822 the CMS appointed West to head the mission in the Red River Colony.

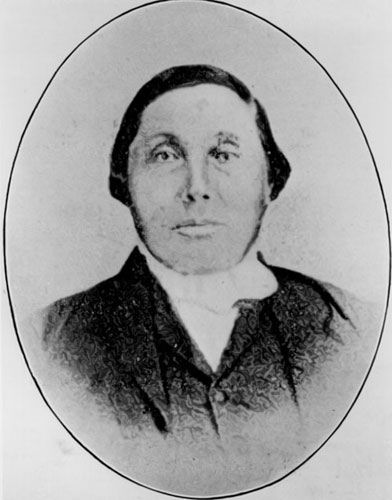
West converted Henry Budd in 1822

Attendance at West's services was encouraging but he alienated many in his congregation such as the Presbyterian Scots by his exclusive use of Anglican liturgy and rites. He was opposed to the liquor and fur trades, core businesses of the Hudson's Bay Company, and to marriage 'à la façon du pays', shaming some members of his congregation into going through an Anglican marriage ceremony with their female native partners. In addition, the Hudson's Bay Company director Nicholas Garry wrote that "West is not a good Preacher; he unfortunately attempts to preach extempore from Notes, for which he has not the Capacity, his discourses being unconnected and ill-delivered. He likewise Mistakes his Point, fancying that by touching severely and pointedly on the Weaknesses of People he will produce Repentance." He offended all by refusing to baptise an illegitimate child. To reach out to his Native Indian parishioners West began to learn a local Indian language. He did not encroach on the activities of the Roman Catholic missionaries even though he distributed Bibles in French and said he intended to learn French - but these activities lead to nothing.

Rather that concentrating his efforts on the Red River settlement only West determined to work throughout the whole of Rupert's Land. With this in mind he travelled to York Factory during the summer months of 1821, 1822 and 1823 and set up an auxiliary Bible society there in 1821 with the assistance of Nicholas Garry. In 1822 West was delighted by the news that the Church Missionary Society would be supporting his efforts by sending Elizabeth Bowden, a schoolmistress and the fiancée of George Harbidge, West's earlier companion to Canada, to teach the Indian girls the Red River settlement. While in York Factory in 1822 West met the expedition of Captain John Franklin, who had been exploring the Arctic in search of the Northwest Passage since 1819. Franklin persuaded West to work among the Inuit at Fort Churchill at Churchill, Manitoba, and West set off to do so in the summer of 1823, walking from York Factory to Fort Churchill and back, a distance of approximately 400 kilometres (240 miles).

== Return to England ==
In June 1823 West sailed for England on what was intended as a temporary visit, returning to Aldershot where he assisted in services and ceremonies, but his contract as a missionary was cancelled by the Church Missionary Society early in 1824 owing in part to his lack of flexibility over his use of Anglican liturgy in Rupert's Land, by the reluctance of the Hudson's Bay Company to finance permanent missions, and because he had failed to win the support of the new Governor, George Simpson, who believed that West was spending too much time catering to the needs of the Indians to the neglect of the needs of the Hudson's Bay Company retirees, who also began to view him in disfavour. However, through his efforts West had laid the foundations that would successfully be built on by his successors. West's book The Substance of a Journal During a Residence at the Red River Colony, British North America; and Frequent Excursions Among the North-West American Indians, in the years 1820, 1821, 1822, 1823 (London, 1824) detailed his experiences as a missionary. The second edition of 1827 included an account of West's trip in 1825–26 to New York, Boston, and the Kennebecasis River in New Brunswick among other locations on behalf of the British and Foreign Bible Society and the New England Company. This trip revealed the committed Roman Catholic faith of the Indians he encountered and in 1826 led the two societies to cancel their operations in the areas visited by him.

== Later years ==
The parish church at Chettle in Dorset where West served as Rector

West settled down as Rector of Chettle in Dorset and to his responsibilities was added the parish of Farnham in Dorset in 1834, in the same year being appointed a domestic chaplain to Baron Duncannon, one of the authors of the Reform Act of 1832. He continued to show great interest in the missionary work being done in Canada and he returned in 1828 to help revive interest in the British and Foreign Bible Society's work there. He was involved in assisting agricultural workers emigrating to New South Wales (Australia) and in establishing a National School in England.

John West died on 21 December 1845 at Chettle in Dorset and was survived by four sons and two daughters, his wife having died in 1839. In the Canadian Calendar of Holy Persons West's Commemoration Day is 31 December. He has a commemorative stained-glass window at his former church at Chettle, where he is buried. St John's Cathedral in Winnipeg which he founded has the John West Hall.
