= David Anderson (bishop of Rupert's Land) =

Anglican priest and bishop

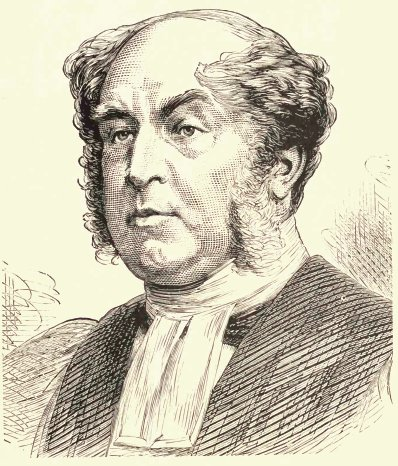
David Anderson

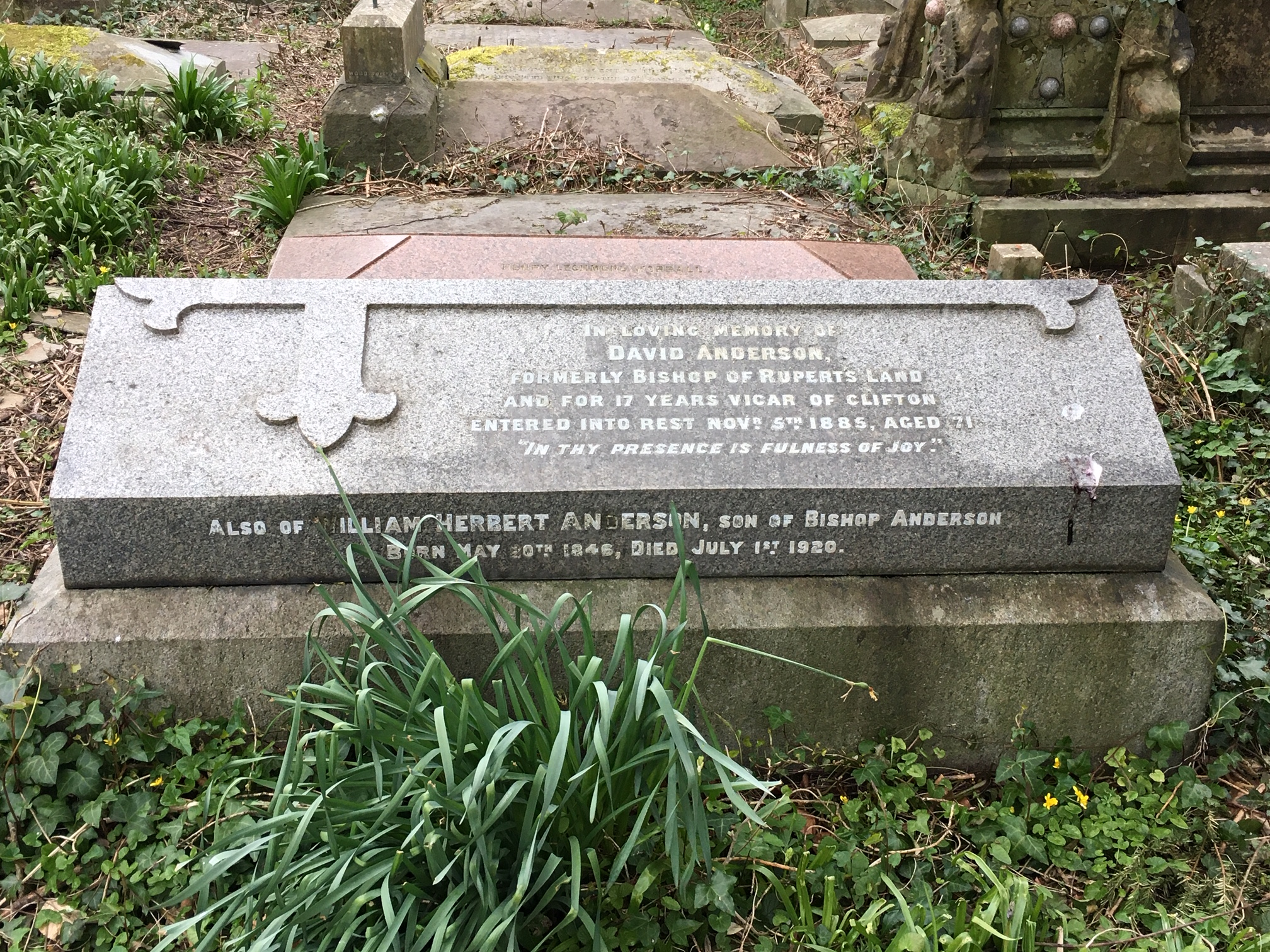
The grave of Anderson in Clifton, Bristol

David Anderson (10 February 1814 – 5 November 1885) was a Church of England priest and the first bishop of Rupert's Land, Canada.

Born in London, England, Anderson was educated at the University of Edinburgh and Exeter College, Oxford. He was the vice-principal of St Bees Theological College, Cumberland (1841–1847) and an incumbent of All Saint's, Derby (1848–1849). He was consecrated a bishop on 29 May 1849 at Canterbury Cathedral by John Bird Sumner, Archbishop of Canterbury. In 1849, he arrived at the Red River Colony as the bishop of Rupert's Land. He lived there until 1864, the year he returned to England. He was later vicar of Clifton (where he is buried) and chancellor of St Paul's Cathedral, London. He received the degree of Doctor of Divinity in 1849. He was the author of Notes on the Flood, Net in the Bay and other works.

Religious titles
Preceded by none	Bishop of Rupert's Land; 1849-1864	Succeeded by Robert Machray
