= Red River Colony =

1811–1870 British colony in modern Canada

- British colony
- 1811–1870
- Flag

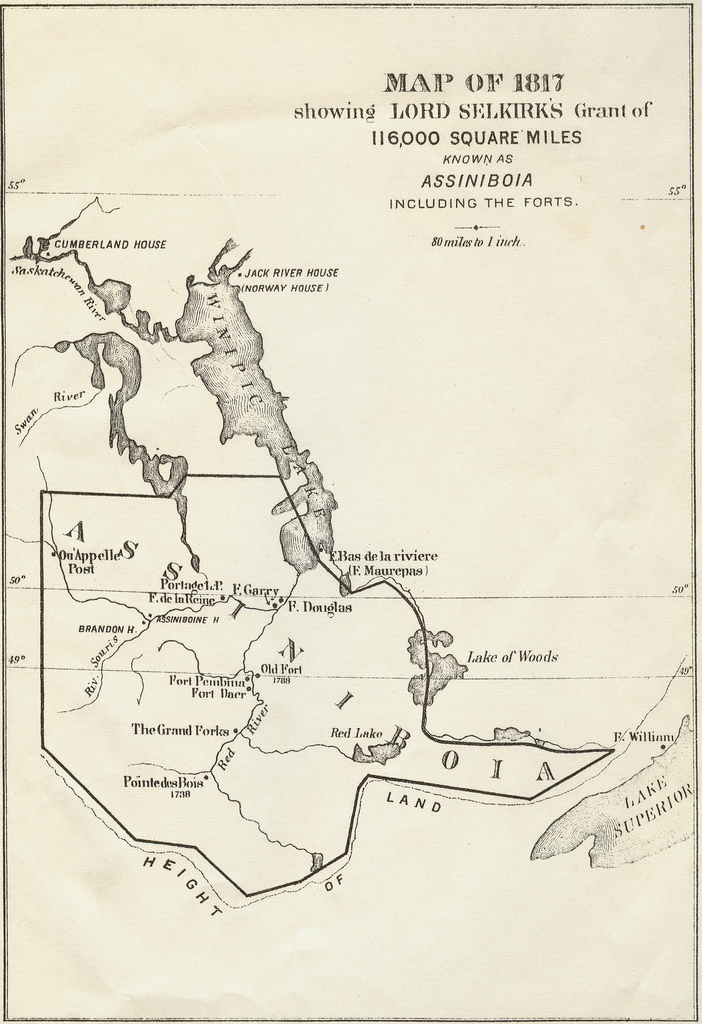
- Selkirk's land grant
- Capital: Upper Fort Garry
- Government
  - Type: Colony
- Governor
  - 1812–1815: Miles Macdonell
  - 1859–1870: William MacTavish
- History
  - Established: 1811
  - Disestablished: July 15 1870
Preceded by
Rupert's Land
Succeeded by
Canada
Manitoba
Missouri Territory

The Red River Colony (or Selkirk Settlement), also known as Assiniboia, was a colonization project set up in 1811 by Thomas Douglas, 5th Earl of Selkirk, on 300,000 square kilometres (120,000 sq mi) of land in British North America in present-day Manitoba. Hudson's Bay Company granted this land to Douglas in what was called the Selkirk Concession. The intent was to found a Scottish colony in Canada's Northwest. But frontier hardships made life difficult for the settlers. As well, the colony was plunged into a conflict with the North West Company that would not end until 1821. The Battle of Seven Oaks forced the temporary abandonment of the settlement. But Selkirk's arrival shortly thereafter re-energized the settlement. The Scottish Protestant presence in the Red River Valley continued even after the area became the site of a Hudson's Bay Company headquarters and a Metis homeland.

== Dimensions of the Selkirk Concession ==
The Selkirk Concession included portions of Rupert's Land, or the watershed of Hudson Bay bounded on the north by the line of 52° N latitude, roughly east from the Assiniboine River to Lake Winnipegosis. The north boundary then followed the line of 52° 30′ N latitude from Lake Winnipegosis to Lake Winnipeg, and then the Winnipeg River, Lake of the Woods and Rainy River. The west boundary of the Selkirk Concession was roughly formed by the current boundary between Saskatchewan and Manitoba.

The Concession covered portions of present-day southern Manitoba, northern Minnesota, and eastern North Dakota, in addition to small parts of eastern Saskatchewan, northwestern Ontario, and northeastern South Dakota. The lands south of the 49th parallel north ceased to be a part of the Red River Colony following the signing of the Treaty of 1818, in which the United Kingdom agreed to cede this territory to the United States.

== History ==
=== Colony conception ===
Growing up in Scotland in the wake of the Jacobite rising of 1745, Lord Selkirk was constantly troubled by the plight of his Scottish kin. William Wilberforce and other humanitarians had much influence on the thinking of Selkirk. Selkirk, following the forced displacement of Scottish farmers that took place during the Highland Clearances, decided that emigration was the only viable option to improve the livelihood of the Scottish people. Upon inheriting his father's title in 1799, Selkirk focused the majority of his time and resources on establishing a Scottish colony in North America.

Selkirk became interested in the Red River region after reading Alexander MacKenzie's Voyages in 1801. However, Selkirk was prevented from settling the region in 1802 when the Hudson's Bay Company raised concerns that the proposed colony would interfere with the running of the company. During the first decade of the nineteenth century Selkirk established two agricultural colonies in British North America They were unsuccessful and short lived, but he pursued the goal of settlement of the Red River region.

By 1807, Selkirk acknowledged that an alliance with either the Hudson's Bay or North West Company, the dominant fur trading companies at the time, was essential to the establishment of a colony at Red River. By 1811, the Hudson's Bay Company had reconsidered Selkirk's proposal and granted Selkirk 300,000 km^{2} (116,000 sq mi), an area five times the size of Scotland, to establish an agricultural settlement in the region of Red River. Supplies of "flour, beef, pork and butter..." were to be manufactured in this colony and reduce the company's costly shipments from Britain.

The grant was signed pending the annual provision of 200 men to the company and Selkirk's assurance that the colony would remain out of the fur trade. Selkirk, who once mocked the fur trade for rarely grossing more than £200,000 and only having three ships employed in its service, agreed to the terms. Selkirk referred to this new territory as the District of Assiniboia. At the time of the concession, Red River was the only Hudson Bay Colony that had been established within the company's 610,000-hectare (1.5-million-acre) territory.

Scholars debate as to whether Selkirk forced the concession of Assiniboia through a controlling interest of Hudson's Bay stock. Some claim Selkirk received the concession by holding controlling shares in the company. Others point out that Selkirk received his initial grant in 1811, prior to his purchase of considerable Hudson's Bay shares in 1811 and 1812.

=== Settling Red River ===
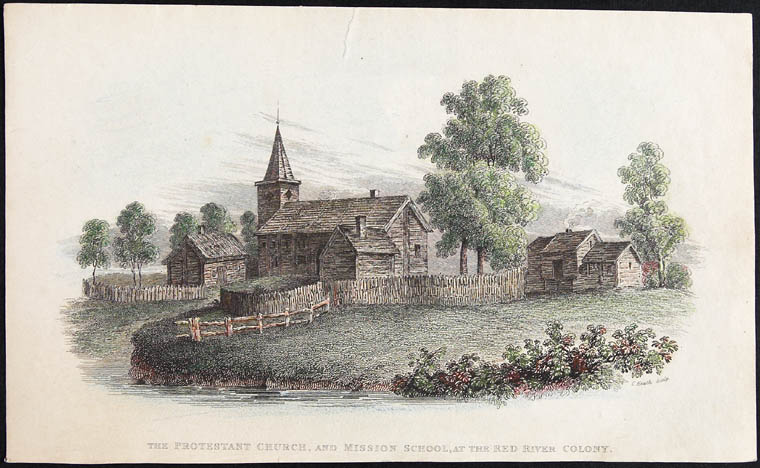
Protestant Church and Mission School, Red River Colony (Manitoba), c. 1820–1840.

The early settlement of the Red River region was marked by a long series of crises and ecological disasters. Within the first decade of settling the region, it suffered warfare, epidemics, prairie fires and a flood. Perhaps the most significant ecological disaster was the rapid depletion of the bison population. Since the 1760s the number of local bison, a vital food source, had been decreasing due to hunting pressure by Euroamerican traders, the local Metis, and First Nations living on the prairies.

In July 1811, Miles Macdonell sailed from Yarmouth, England to the Hudson's Bay post at York Factory with 36 primarily Irish and Scottish settlers. They had to overwinter at the Bay and then did not arrive at Red River until August the next year, after the planting season had ended. By then they were only 18 in number. The settlers constructed Fort Douglas and hunted bison for food. They were completely unprepared for the arrival of 120 additional settlers in October. More settlers were scheduled to arrive in 1813, but due to a fever outbreak on their ship, they did not arrive until June 21, 1814.

Dogged by poor harvests, Macdonell, now governor of Red River, issued the Pemmican Proclamation in January 1814 to prevent the export of pemmican from the colony. In doing so, Macdonell undermined the security of Red River and plunged the colony into a conflict with the North West Company that would not end until 1821.

=== War between the companies ===
The Pemmican War that was initiated by Macdonell's proclamation was the tail end of a larger conflict between the Hudson's Bay Company and its fur trade rivals, both English and French, in Montreal. The conflict dates back to King Charles II's generous grant of Rupert's Land to emigrants who were members of the nobility in 1670. Cause for conflict arose from the inability of either the Montreal traders or the Hudson's Bay Company to gain a monopoly over the North American fur trade. Between 1800 and 1821, the conflict between Hudson's Bay and Montreal, at that point represented by the predominantly Scottish North West Company, intensified. The conflict reached its peak in 1801 and witnessed both companies expending more resources on out-competing each other than were expended on the exploration of new fur grounds. Between 1803 and 1804, Hudson's Bay morale had plummeted in the face of fierce Northwest competition and forced the two companies into negotiations but neither side could come to terms. Negotiations broke down again in 1805 and despite employing more aggressive agents and the provision of incentive programs, the Hudson's Bay Company was ready to abandon the fur trade in 1809. The Nor'Westers ability to make region-wide plans based on first-hand knowledge in addition to their ability to react quickly to changing circumstances provided the North West Company with a decisive advantage prior to 1810. After 1810, the combination of new management within the Hudson's Bay Company and the approval of a company-sponsored colony at Red River put the North West Company on the defensive. The establishment of a Hudson's Bay colony in the Red River region denied the Nor'Westers access to vital supplies and restricted the company's ability to expand westwards. Additionally, the establishment of an agricultural colony made the Hudson's Bay company nondependent on the profitable fur trade, a factor that the Nor'Westers simply could not compete with. Moreover, by establishing an agricultural colony, the Hudson's Bay Company gained a decisive advantage over the North West Company by virtue of a viable fallback economy as well as a readily available food source during economic slumps. Much of this new-found confidence hinged on the Selkirk's success at Red River and resulted in the colony becoming the central focus of seven years of inter-company warfare.

Red River first came under attack from the North West Company in the summer of 1815. Convinced that Macdonell's proclamation was a deliberate attempt to block Northwest trade, the NWC employees destroyed Fort Douglas and burned down all of the surrounding buildings. The fort was later rebuilt but the engagement resulted in the capture of approximately 150 settlers including Macdonell. He was replaced by Robert Semple who took over as governor the following winter and reinforced the colony's 45 survivors with 84 additional settlers. In 1815, the North West Company once again entered into negotiations with the Hudson's Bay Company under the threat of invasion of Northwest territory. Negotiations were headed by Selkirk himself and he promptly threw out all of the Nor'Wester proposals. The following year Semple and twenty other settlers were killed in the Battle of Seven Oaks and the settlement was abandoned once again. The imminent arrival of Selkirk in 1817, who had been en route to the colony prior to the incident at Seven Oaks, prompted the settlers to return to the colony shortly after. Travelling with a force of approximately 100 soldiers from the recently disbanded Swiss and German Regiment de Meuron and De Watteville's Regiment, Selkirk captured Fort William, the North West Company headquarters, and captured several key agents including William McGillivray, Kenneth McKenzie and John McLoughlin. Although the arrival and subsequent settlement of Selkirk's private army finally broke the back of the North West Company, Selkirk spent much of his remaining years, and the majority of his fortune, defending his actions at Fort William.

When Selkirk arrived at Red River in 1817, the stability of the colony dramatically improved, especially after the removal of all Indigenous claims to the land. Selkirk achieved this by signing a treaty between the Red River colonists and the local Cree, Assiniboine and Ojibwa. Between 1817 and 1820, Selkirk committed all of his available resources to the betterment of his colonial venture, and ironically it was Selkirk's death in the spring of 1820 that ultimately ended Northwest aggression against his beloved colony.

The lands south of the 49th parallel north ceased to be a part of the Red River Colony following the signing of the Treaty of 1818, in which the United Kingdom agreed to cede this territory to the United States. It was later discovered that the Northwest Angle had also been ceded.

=== Rising colony ===
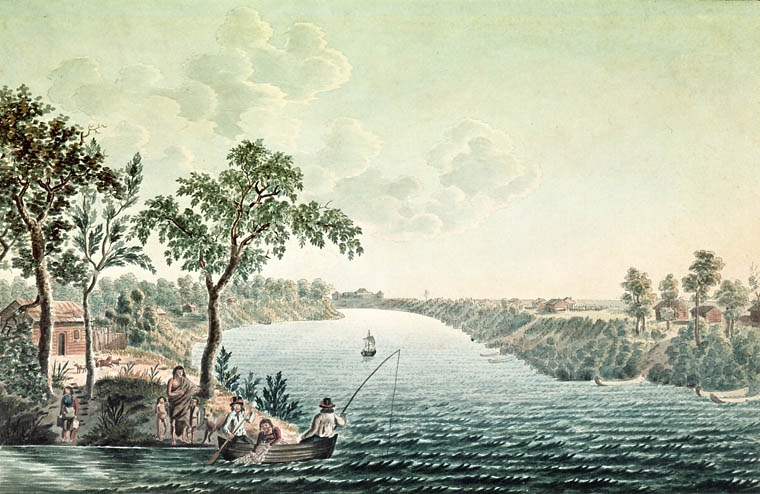
Homes on narrow river lots along the Red River in 1822 by Peter Rindisbacher with Fort Douglas in the background

The rivalling Hudson's Bay Company and North West Company were forced to merge in 1821 by the British government, and from then until 1870 the area was under the jurisdiction of the Assinboia Council, an appointed body with representatives of various sections of Red River society (francophone and anglophone, Roman Catholic and Protestant officials, Métis, Scottish, Irish, French-Canadian, etc.), all sharing a common past or present involvement with the Companies. While the end of the fur trade's inspired conflicts on the plains, the Red River settlement was able to grow in both population and economic importance with the expansion of commercially oriented agriculture (raising of staple crops). The agricultural products, primarily wheat, began to rise in yearly yields. Flour production rose from over 9,100 kilograms (20,000 lb) annually from 1823 to 1829 to over 14,000 kg (30,000 lb) in the early 1830s. The supply of flour reached over 23,000 kg (50,000 lb) by the mid-1830s, rapidly deflating the price the HBC paid the farmers for the product. Numbering over 1,000 by 1827, the farmers began to complain about the deflating rates they received and lack of markets for their goods.

In 1841, James Sinclair guided 200 settlers from the Red River Colony west in an attempt to retain the Columbia District for British North America. The party crossed the Rockies into the Columbia Valley, near present-day Radium Hot Springs, British Columbia; then travelled south. Despite such efforts, the British government eventually ceded all claim to land south of the 49th parallel of latitude west of the Rockies to the United States as a resolution to the Oregon boundary dispute.

=== Red River Resistance ===
==== American annexation plans ====
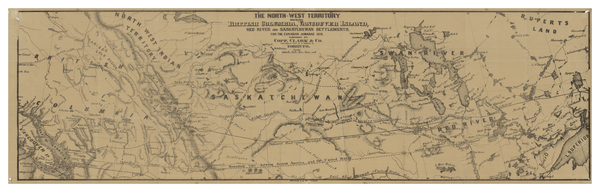
Map showing parts of the Northwest Territories, British Columbia, Saskatchewan, and Manitoba (referred to on the map by its historic name of Red River Settlement), published in 1870.

American expansionists became heavily interested in the economic potential the territory of the Red River Colony possessed. The ideal soil, climate and socio-economic potential of the area convinced many Americans that they needed to make the territory part of the United States. The result ended up being an annexation proposal of Red River in 1870, in order to convert it into land that American settlers could use for economic purposes. With the outbreak of the Red River Rebellion, the American annexationists hoped to take advantage of the resulting disruption and present themselves as the ideal leaders of the Red River land. The annexation was led by Minnesota senator Alexander Ramsey, and was backed by Zachariah Chandler and Jacob M. Howard, who were both senators of Michigan and represented Detroit merchants. They all shared the same economic vision for the annexation: Ramsey believed that the Red River valley would serve as an important commercial adjunct for his state, while Chandler and Howard believed that annexing the Red River would benefit their Great Lakes Trade. This was done under the belief it would help them in their attempts to colonize the region, as it prevented the Canadian government from establishing sovereignty over the area. American special agent and Winnipeg consul James W. Taylor used his political power to shape the destiny of the valley, which called for the removal of all English-Canadian influence.

The proposal was met with a significant amount of resistance from the inhabitants of the Red River as they were given the chance to address their grievances about the potential loss of land and becoming part of an American colonization project through a proclamation by the Governor-General of the dominion. Americans who supported annexation by the U.S. government tried to depict themselves as favorable figures in the eyes of the Métis by associating themselves with Louis Riel. The Rebellion was an unarmed conflict started by the Métis because Canada was attempting to claim possession of Rupert's Land without any concern for the grievances of the Métis. However, the main American intention behind their decision to support Riel and the Rebellion was to sway the Métis in favour of the annexation by the US. One of their tools was the New Nation newspaper, which elicited rhetoric that advocated annexation by the US because it embodied the popular Manifest Destiny ideology. This was meant to help the cause of annexation, the idea being that their support of the Red River Rebellion would encourage local resistance against the Canadian government, and help swing local opinion in favour of independence – then ultimately Americans would step in to offer the protection of the United States government to the Red River Métis and assert themselves as the new leaders and Red River would become American land. They ultimately wanted to create a situation where the Red River could become American territory by allying with the discontented Métis Nation.

However, this ultimately backfired upon the proposal of annexation and created more hostility towards the annexation party. The Americans became too acquisitive because they were eager to create a political union. This ultimately caused the annexation of the North West to fail, despite its being almost within reach. It did, however, ultimately benefit the cause of Riel and the Rebellion. As a result, the Metis were able to successfully defy Canadian expansion into Rupert's Land.

==== Legislative Assembly of Assiniboia, Louis Riel, and the Manitoba Act ====
This political chaos, in a sense, became pivotal for Red River because it allowed for the success of the Métis in their rebellion. In 1870, the elected Legislative Assembly of Assinboia was created by Red River inhabitants to take the place of the unelected Assiniboia Council. The Canadian government was forced to develop the negotiations that allowed for the Métis demands that were legally entrenched in the Manitoba Act which eventually led to the creation of the province of Manitoba. The political disputes put the Métis on a platform to voice their disapproval of Americans ignoring their concerns over these land disputes. They had legitimate claims to the land and they stated that they were the "descendants of the lords of the soil.". Also, under Louis Riel's leadership, the Metis rebels were able to capture Fort Garry – a fortified post of the Hudson's Bay Company. This would lead Riel into becoming the leader of the provisional government, and he composed and sent a list of rights to Ottawa. The demands mainly consisted of the Métis wanting Red River to be entered into Canadian Confederation as a province, security for their land claims, making English and French the official languages of the colony, as well as financial support for the Red River population. Riel hoped to accomplish a sense of equality for the Métis; he wanted to present them as a civilized people that were deserving of the same rights of any British subject. The rebellion became a pivotal moment in acquiring land rights and a political voice for the Métis, who were constantly disregarded for their Aboriginal status.

The aftermath of the rebellion caused the Métis to no longer be considered as Canadian Aboriginals – they became regarded as their own social group, and were distinct from other Aboriginal groups. In order to pacify the Métis resistance further, the Canadian government gave them generous land grants in 1869–70 that were carefully structured to be given in severalty, rather than in common. Red River was now developing its own provincial government that had a political voice and political implications upon Canadian federal government. This rebellion also led to the Métis emerging as a unique, acknowledged group within Canada, and ultimately, the disappearance of the Aboriginal rights paradigm in the public view of Red River. The rebellion was successful in a sense that it allowed the Métis to have a political voice, but it impacted the perception of how other Aboriginals would be viewed in Red River.

Once the rebellion ended, Riel and several of his comrades fled to the United States in 1870 upon being informed that several government soldiers and irregulars were looking to kill him to exact revenge for several incidents, in particular, the execution of Thomas Scott. Riel, however later returned to Canada in 1885 to help lead the North West rebellion. This caused him to face trial in a Canadian court, and eventually to being executed by the Canadian government in Regina. His death provoked outcry among the French Canadian, First Nations and Métis communities, with particular uproar in Québec in reaction to the execution of a French-speaking, Catholic political leader, and Riel's death was seen on all sides (among those who saw Riel as a traitor who was rightly punished and those outraged at his arrest and execution) as symbolic of the danger that could result from contesting Canadian government policy. Riel would subsequently be claimed as a hero and martyr by the French-Canadian, Métis, and various First Nations for decades. The Canadian government was starting to punish the rebels for their defiance, but the rebellion is still considered a success in the sense that the Metis were still able to acquire the land rights they hoped to achieve, as well as no longer being ignored when it came to federal matters.

=== Development of Manitoba ===
The Red River rebellion needed to be finally be put to rest. In order to accomplish this, the Canadian government, which was predominantly led by English-Canadian conservatives, initiated the Manitoba Act in 1870. They believed that this act would accomplish two purposes: this would be able to crush the rebellion, while, at the same time, appeasing the French demands for increasing French influence in Canada because the act would create a Western province that was constitutionally supportive of French Canadian language and culture. These were the first steps towards the creation of the present-day province of Manitoba. The act was given royal assent on May 12, 1870, and Manitoba acquired provincial status on July 15, 1870. After the passage of the Manitoba Act, the Métis Provisional government was disbanded. There was an assimilation of the Métis people and the European settlers, and the Aboriginal influence was further distanced from Red River.

Through the act, the Red River colony was now christened as Manitoba: a new Canadian province that was self-governed, and that had its own rights and responsibilities. It was no longer a territory and was now officially part of the Canadian confederation. Provincial status was accelerated by Louis Riel's rebellion. The early Manitoba provincial government initially struggled to be effective. Everything around it felt rushed because the Manitoba Act was mostly created to prevent another Red River Rebellion. Many of the government officials were inexperienced – especially the three delegates who went to Ottawa to negotiate union terms. None of them had experience with diplomacy or the creation of new governments. Due to the hurried nature of the creation of this province, the officials of this new government presented themselves as overwhelmed and unprepared, and this shows that Manitoba was essentially created to re-stabilize political unrest within Canada.

Many in French Canada had seen the establishment of Manitoba, officially bilingual and with a large francophone and Catholic population, as a counter-balance to English and Protestant dominance in the Canadian Confederation, while some hoped the province would be a political entity centered or at least heavily influenced by indigenous or Métis communities. Once the rebellion was put down and Manitoba was admitted, thousands of largely Protestant, anglophone Ontarians quickly began migrating to the prairies, and their presence swiftly shifted the demographic, national, and linguistic profile of the province, which in turn meant the election of provincial governments decisively oriented towards Ontario and English Canada, rather than French Canada, Métis, First Nations, or balance between these groups. The Manitoba government also sought to encourage immigration and the immediate establishment and expansion of stable agricultural communities, and within a two decades many thousands of international migrants, largely ethnic Ukrainians and Germans, had come to the province as agricultural settlers. The Catholic Church also continued to encouraged migration and settlement from Quebec and francophone Ontario to Manitoba, however these settlers were far outnumbered by English settlers as well international migrants whose communities would be assimilated in Anglo-Canadian society.

In the province's first few decades of existence (1870–1900), Manitoba experienced conflicting interests between French and English Canadians. A quarter-century after the implementation of the Manitoba Act, which legally guaranteed a place for the French language in the province's administration, lawmaking, and judiciary, along with a clause ensuring state funding for both Catholic (often de facto French) and Protestant schools, English had become the sole means of communication in the legislature and the judiciary, while the provincial government attempted the introduction of a secular, English-only public school system which would be the sole recipient of any public funding. The policy was eventually implemented with minor concessions (such as the teaching of Catholic doctrine at the end of the day where the number of students warranted), and the role of French in these new public schools was highly limited, mainly to use as means of instructing young students who started school not speaking English.

== Women in the colony ==
The position of many women in the Red River Colony was determined within the Hudson's Bay Company's 1670 Charter; this document gave legislative and judicial powers in Rupert's Land to the company. It is stated within the Charter that the legal status of women is as dependents of a male authority, which included fathers, husbands or brothers.

In an extremely rare example of a woman successfully challenging this status-quo, Maria Thomas, a 16-year-old Métis domestic servant, took her employer, Rev. Owen Corbett, to court for repeatedly raping her and subjecting her to illegal abortions. Thomas, in her testimony, used the laws in place to challenge Corbett's actions; citing British law against forcing individuals to undergo abortions, which were illegal. She won the case; however, Corbett was freed from jail shortly after by a group of settlers who were opposed to the trial. The courts did not challenge this, fearing a possible insurrection, demonstrating the weakness of the colonial authorities in the nascent colony.

In the establishing years of the Hudson's Bay Company and the North West Company, male settlers frequently took a First Nations or Metis spouse. Though only encouraged by the NWC for trade relations, it was a common practice among European employees of both companies due to the various policies by the companies which only allowed males to emigrate to fur trading outposts. When female settlers did eventually start emigrating to the settlement, tensions between the European and indigenous communities were heightened due to the highly restrictive gender norms these women brought with them from Europe. In part a reflection of their conservative morals, many settlers in the colony also claimed to observe differences between European and indigenous women; Alexander Ross, a Scottish author who lived in the Red River Colony for a number of years, stated in a book written by him on the colony's history that a friend informed him that European women were required to be "graceful" unlike indigenous women, who were exempt from this due to their bashfulness.

== Métis people of the Red River Colony ==
The mixed ethnicity of indigenous and European peoples at the Red River Colony, known as Metis, were not always referred to by that name in the beginning years of their existence. Augustus Chetlain, an author who lived in the colony, wrote in his book that they were often called "Brules, Metifs, or half-breeds, the bastard sons of Indian concubines".

The culture and lifestyle of the Metis community living in Red River were not only present at the colony. Metis people had a long-lasting tradition of a semi-annual, commercial, buffalo hunt that took place throughout the prairies starting in the mid-1700s with the western fur trade. The Hudson's Bay Company's journals and a number of witnesses to these events stated that the united caravan was commonly known as a brigade. These brigades did not just focus on buffalo hunting but were used by buffalo hunters to trade and freight during this time. Women were fundamental in both actively participating in the brigade hunts or trade, as well as the bringing together of people prior to the excursion. By studying the social network of the Trottier Brigade, a community of people from the White Horse Plains in Red River, it is notable that biologically related women brought the majority of the men together.

Throughout the time that Metis people were a part of the Red River community they developed into several different identities, rather than just the common depiction of the bison-hunting French Catholic Metis. Metis identity, at that time as it is today, was diverse and complex due to the different livelihoods and practices followed. Metis who chose not to live on prairies and hunt buffalo for the winter remained on lakes such as Manitoba, Winnipegosis, and Winnipeg to ice fish. Over the course of the first half of the 19th century, up to forty households had developed on the lakeshore of Lake Manitoba. Fishing and trading had become year round practices and the Metis families involved would trade with HBC and ‘Freemen’- traders that did not work at the post.

Christianity played a vital role in shaping the community within the colony, especially for the Metis people. In the early 19th century, considerations were made by the Committee in London to open schools run by the Clergymen to benefit, in their opinion, from instruction in religion and civilization. Although these schools took in all children of the colony, mixed-ancestry children were a large focus due to them being tied to the fur trading post by their European fathers. John Halkett, a Committee member, wanted Metis families of retired HBC employees to be brought to Red River (from other nearby posts) to be put under the authority of the Roman Catholic Mission or Church Missionary Society. This plan was largely related to keeping retired Metis employees from continuing trade with the Indigenous peoples; however, its effect led to Christianity being a prominent part of culture for the Metis community. The Chaplain of the Hudson's Bay Company, John West, was also interested in the religious educating of Metis children. According to his book, he wrote to the Governor submitting a plan to gather up a number of children to care for and educate. He stated that he created this plan when he saw these children being raised in a way he deemed ignorant and idle.

The above-mentioned differences in religion, ways of life, and ethnic origins largely followed a pattern based on the initial contact between individuals, groups, and institutions. For example, large communities within the Cree nation are thought to have come into contact with French and later French-Canadian traders bringing Catholic priests and missionaries in their wake, later Scottish traders and the Company brought Protestant missionaries and clergy into Ojibwe-dominated areas. This division into a Cree-French-Catholic oriented group and an Ojibwe-Scottish-Protestant oriented group can be seen in the rise of the two main Métis languages: Mitchif, a French and Cree-based mixed-language whose speakers were largely Catholic, and Bungi, a form of speech that developed from Ojibwe, Scots, English, Gaelic, and Cree and was mostly spoken by Protestants (Anglican, Presbyterian).

== Church Missionary Society ==
The Church Missionary Society (CMS) provided financial assistance in 1820 to Reverend John West, chaplain to the Hudson's Bay Company, towards the education of some First Nations children, including James Settee and Henry Budd of the Cree nation, both of whom were later ordained as priests. In 1822, the CMS appointed Revd West to head the mission in the Red River Colony. He was succeeded in 1823 by the Revd David Jones who was joined by the Revd W and Mrs Cockran in 1825. The mission expanded and by 1850, the missionaries were active throughout the colony and were travelling to Fort Simpson on the Mackenzie River.

== Governors of Red River ==
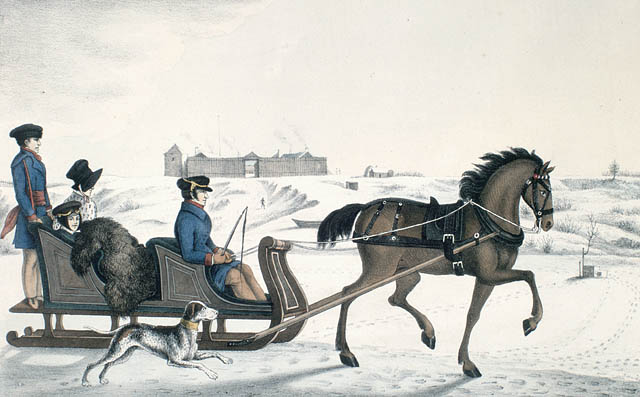
Governor of Red River, Andrew Bulger, driving his family on the frozen Red River in a horse cariole with Fort Garry in the background (1822–23)

Term	Governor
August 1812 – June 1815	Miles MacDonell
June 1815 – June 1816	Robert Semple
August 1816 – June 1822	Alexander Macdonnell
June 1822 – June 1823	Andrew Bulger
June 1823 – June 1825	Robert Parker Pelly
June 1825 – June 1833	Donald McKenzie
June 1833 – June 1839	Alexander Christie
June 1839 – June 1844	Duncan Finlayson
June 1844 – June 1846	Alexander Christie
June 1846 – June 1847	John Folliott Crofton
June 1847 – June 1848	John T. Griffiths
June 1848 – June 1855	William Bletterman Caldwell
June 1855 – September 1859	Francis Godschall Johnson
September 1859 – July 1870	William MacTavish

== See also ==
- Former colonies and territories in Canada
- Territorial evolution of Canada
