= St. Paul's Cathedral (Regina, Saskatchewan) =

Anglican cathedral in Canada

St Paul's Cathedral
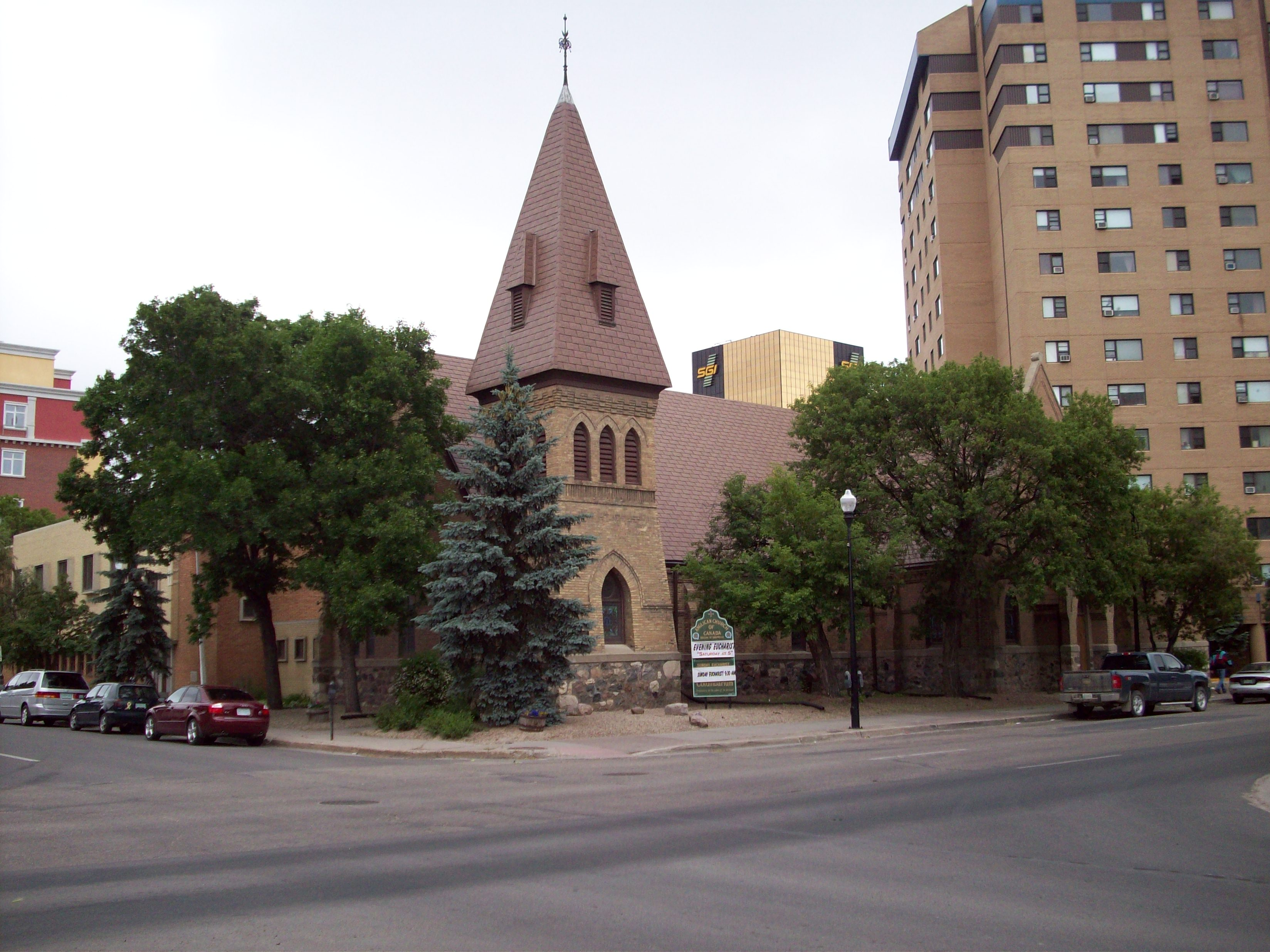
- St Paul's Cathedral, Regina, 2008
- St Paul's Cathedral
- 50.4491°N 104.6161°W
- Location: Regina, Saskatchewan
- Country: Canada
- Denomination: Anglican Church of Canada
- Website: stpaulsregina.com

History
- Status: Cathedral
- Founded: 1883

Administration
- Province: Ruperts Land
- Diocese: Qu'Appelle
- Deanery: Wascana
- Parish: St Paul's

Clergy
- Bishop: The Right Rev. Robert Hardwick
- Dean: The Very Rev. Michael Sinclair

St Paul's Anglican Cathedral is an historic church building located on the outskirts of Regina's central business district. Built as a parish church in 1894–1895, it became the pro-cathedral of the Anglican Diocese of Qu'Appelle in southern Saskatchewan, Canada, in 1944 when pro-cathedral status was removed from St Peter's, Qu'Appelle, in the eponymous former see city which had become moribund. In 1973, when it had become clear that the once-planned grand cathedral for Regina — at the corner of Broad Street and College Avenue — was no longer a feasible project, its status was raised to that of cathedral.

== Configuration ==
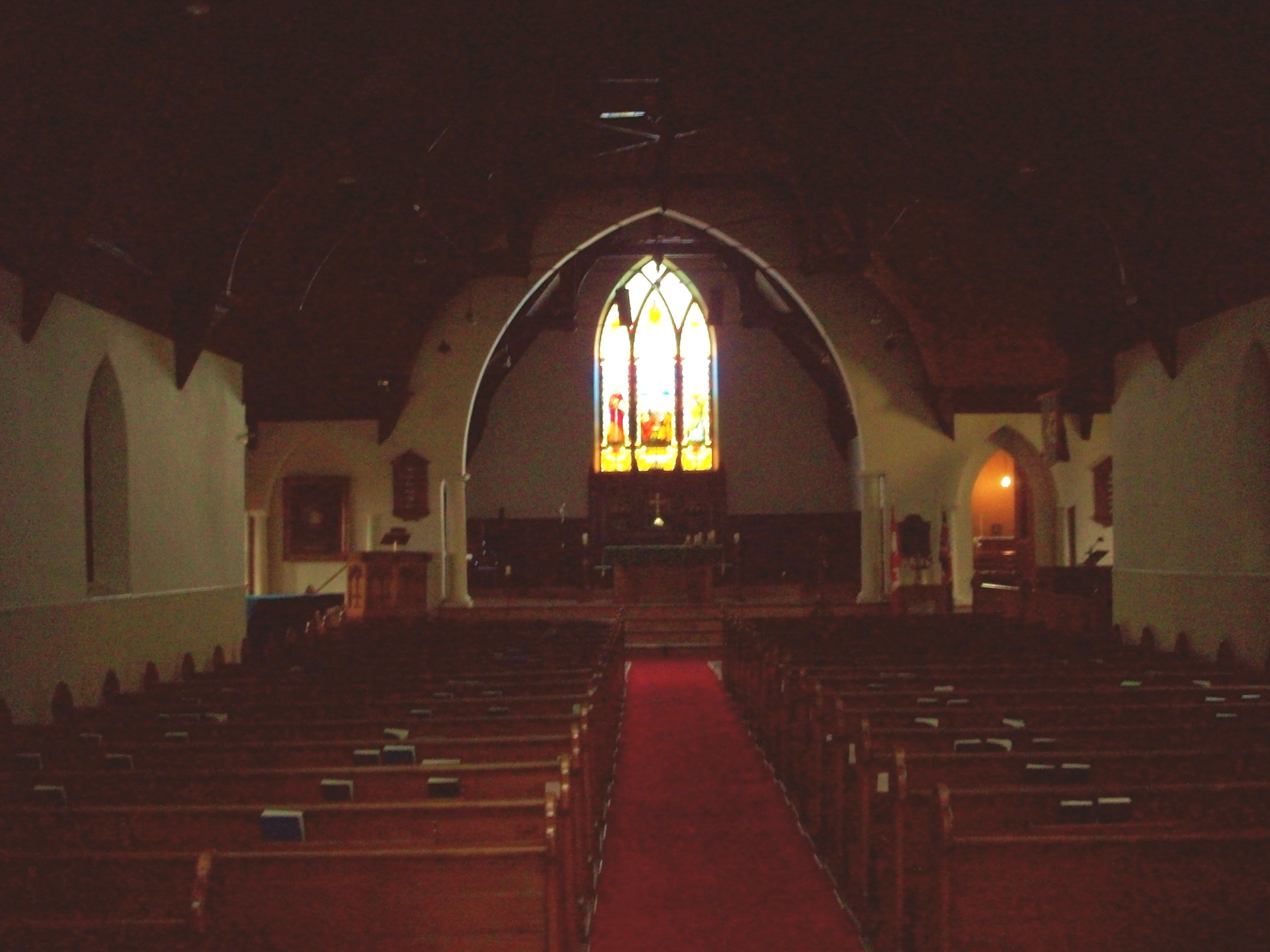
St Paul's Cathedral, Regina, interior

The church seats approximately 300 people. It is in the approved Cambridge Camden Society configuration with gable roof in keeping with the moderately high church sensibilities of the diocese of Qu'Appelle, albeit of extremely modest appearance both inside and out, reflecting the extreme numerical and financial minority status of Anglicanism in Western Canada and the tendency for moneyed benefactors to be of more mainstream denominational allegiance.

There is a Lady Chapel to the liturgical and geographical south of the chancel, and a columbarium in the crypt. The parish dates from the original establishment of the town of Regina in 1882, when the current church site was purchased.

In 1883, a wooden frame building, measuring 50 by 24 feet, was opened and in 1894–1895, the present brick and fieldstone church was built. A chancel and transepts were added in 1905–06. It is the oldest church building in Regina still in use. The organ console was, until May 1974, immediately north (both geographically and theologically) of the wall between the chancel and the chapel; the choir west of the altar; the organ pipes to the north of the chancel, behind the pulpit. The new organ pipes were in the north transept, above the choir, with the console at the southwest corner. The console and choir have been variously relocated since then.

It has a curious history as:

1. originally a vastly secondary parishional site when the diocese was centred elsewhere in the then-district of the North-West (sic) Territories;
2. a temporary cathedral site prior to the building of a more substantial building on the diocesan complex on the southeast of Broad Street and College Avenue; and
3. ultimately itself designated the cathedral when it had become accepted that previous plans were not feasible to build a substantial cathedral on the Diocese of Qu'Appelle's property at the corner of College Avenue and Broad Street.

== History ==
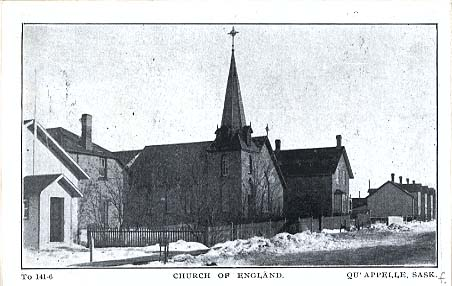
St. Peter's, Qu'Appelle, until 1944 the pro-cathedral of the Diocese of Qu'Appelle; in this photo while it still was, with the first Bishop's Court next door before relocation to Indian Head and then Regina.

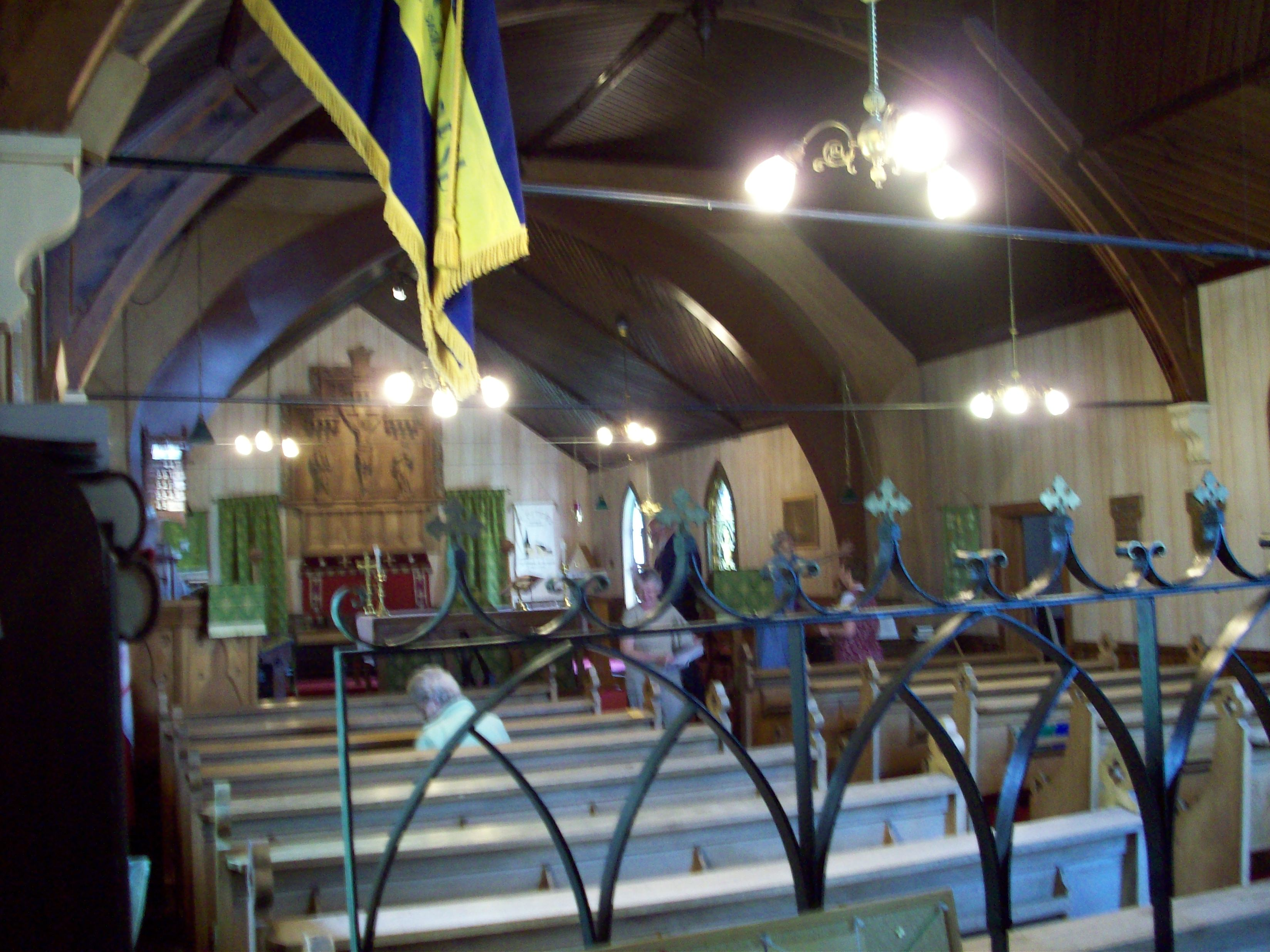
St. Peter's, Qu'Appelle, in 2008.

In anticipation of its presumed eventual urban importance the Anglican ecclesiastical province of Ruperts Land designated the village of Qu'Appelle, some 30 miles east of the site which became Regina, now (what fragment of it still remains) on the Trans-Canada Highway, as the cathedral city of the new diocese of Qu'Appelle, although there was also an element of the churchmanship in St. Paul's Regina at a time when the town of Qu'Appelle's anticipated significance was already passing: "Opposition by the congregation of St. Paul’s, Regina, to candles on the altar led Anson to ask the people of St. Peter’s, Qu’Appelle to become the pro-cathedral." The Diocese of Qu'Appelle still retains that name, though the historic significance of the town's parish church other than as a subsidiary associate-congregation of the parish of Indian Head is long past.

The once significant town was doomed by the Lieutenant-Governor Edgar Dewdney acquiring substantial land ownership at the site Pile-of-Bones, soon re-named Regina, and deeming it the capital of the North-West Territories (as then spelled), as early as 1883. Nevertheless, optimism persisted as to the continuing significance of the town of Qu'Appelle and the old pro-cathedral was built in 1885. St Paul's, Regina supplanted St Peter's, Qu'Appelle as the pro-cathedral of the diocese in 1944. The name "Qu'Appelle" of course retains actual significance as to the Qu'Appelle Valley.

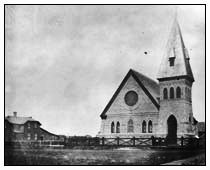
St Paul's, Regina, circa 1895. Note the long-demolished rectory, to the north of the church.

Obviously once Regina was named territorial headquarters and, in 1905, provincial capital, it made more sense for the cathedral city to be the capital city of the civil province, though cathedral "cities" that are actually mere villages or towns are far from a rarity: see Our Lady of Assumption Co-Cathedral (Gravelbourg, Saskatchewan) and for that matter, say, Rochester Cathedral in England.

(The diocese in fact was originally precisely coterminous with the District of Assiniboia of the North-West Territories, though in the 1970s a strip of the diocese which since the creation of the civil provinces of Saskatchewan and Alberta had lain over the Alberta provincial boundary was ceded to the diocese of Calgary.)

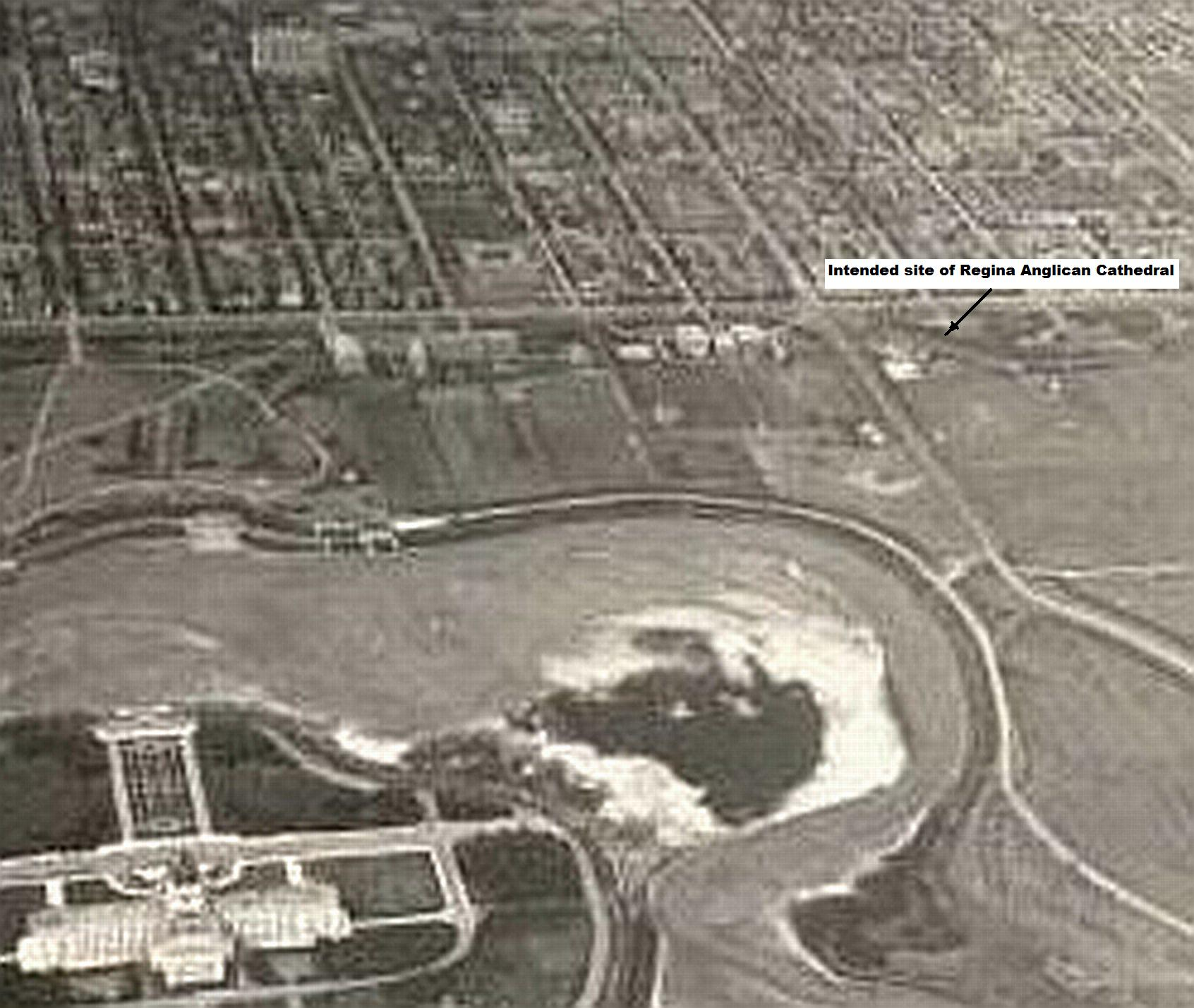
Intended site of the mooted Regina Anglican Cathedral, cnr Broad Street and College Avenue on the former Anglican Diocesan property, 1930s during the dredging and deepening of Wascana Lake. The Saskatchewan provincial legislative building is in the lower left hand corner.

Beginning in the 1890s the indicia of diocesan metropolitan status were incrementally removed from Qu'Appelle, first to Indian Head and then Regina where the de facto diocesan administrative headquarters, with Bishops Court, the St Chad's theological college and the Qu'Appelle Diocesan School were established by the beginning of the 20th century.

Bishop's Court and the diocesan administrative bureaucracy having been removed first to Indian Head in the 1890s and then Regina at the beginning of the twentieth century, pro-cathedral status was ultimately removed from St Peter's, Qu'Appelle and conferred on St Paul's, Regina in 1944: at that time the diocesan property at the corner of Broad Street and College Avenue was planned ultimately to contain a substantial cathedral, whose anticipated site is still outlined in caragana hedges and whose liturgical west front faced the intersection to the northwest. By 1974 fiscal and demographic realities—Anglicans are a tiny minority of the population of southern Saskatchewan—had dispelled that fantasy and St Paul's was formally elevated to cathedral status.

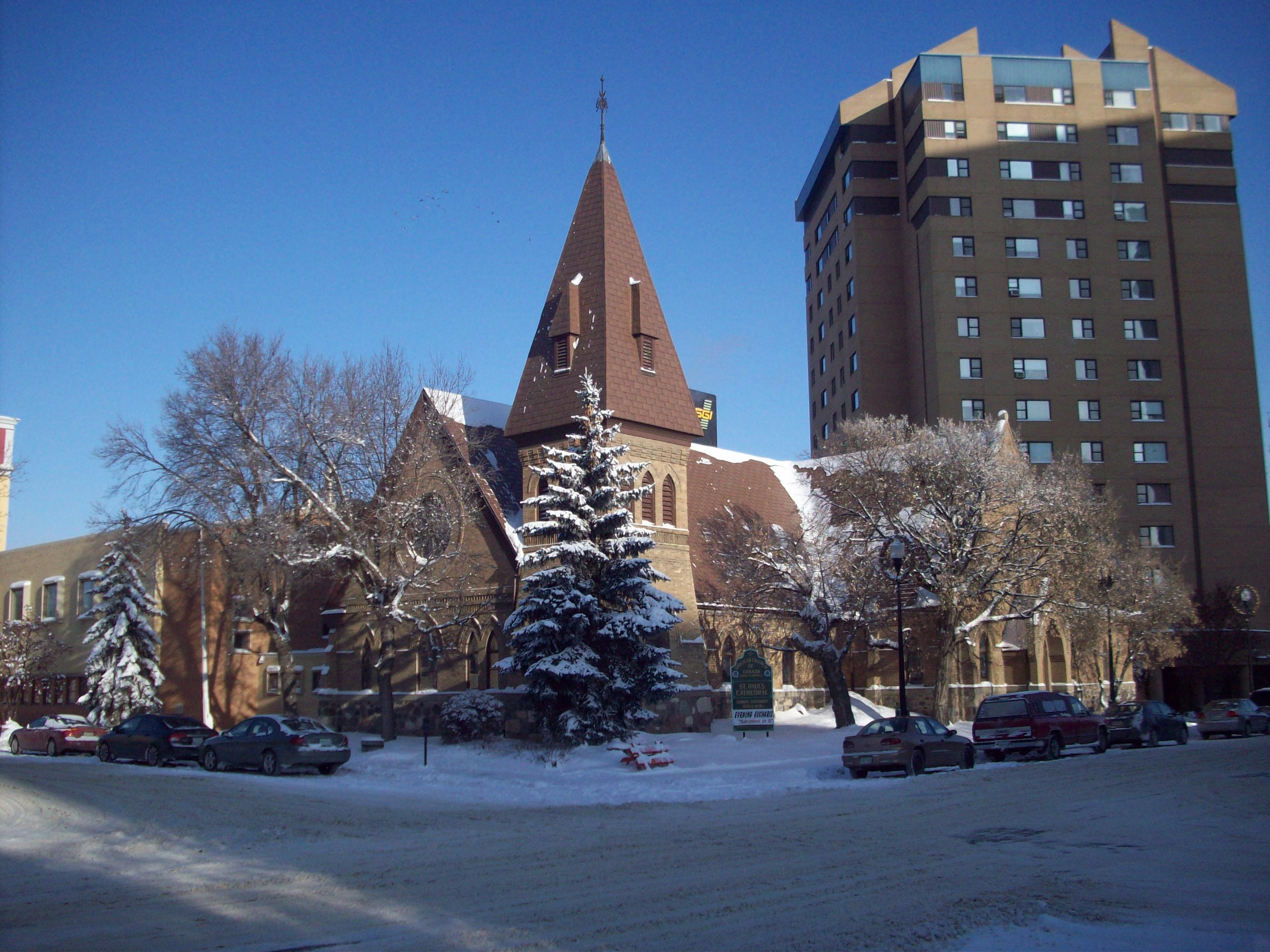
St Paul's Cathedral, Regina, winter 2010.

The original rectory (from 1944 onwards the deanery) stood immediately to the north of the church on the site of the present parish hall. It was demolished and a new deanery purchased on Angus Crescent; this subsequently has also been alienated, and the cathedral dean is provided with a housing allowance in order to arrange his or her own housing privately.

The cathedral has intermittently been the home of impressive liturgy and music (see Donald M. Kendrick); latterly its worship has been infelicitously described as "high church meets happy clappy." Significant redecoration of the cathedral's interior occurred in the 1980s during the deanship of the Very Rev. Duncan Wallace, later himself a bishop of Qu'Appelle. At present plans are afoot to replace the parish hall.

== St Paul's as a cathedral church ==
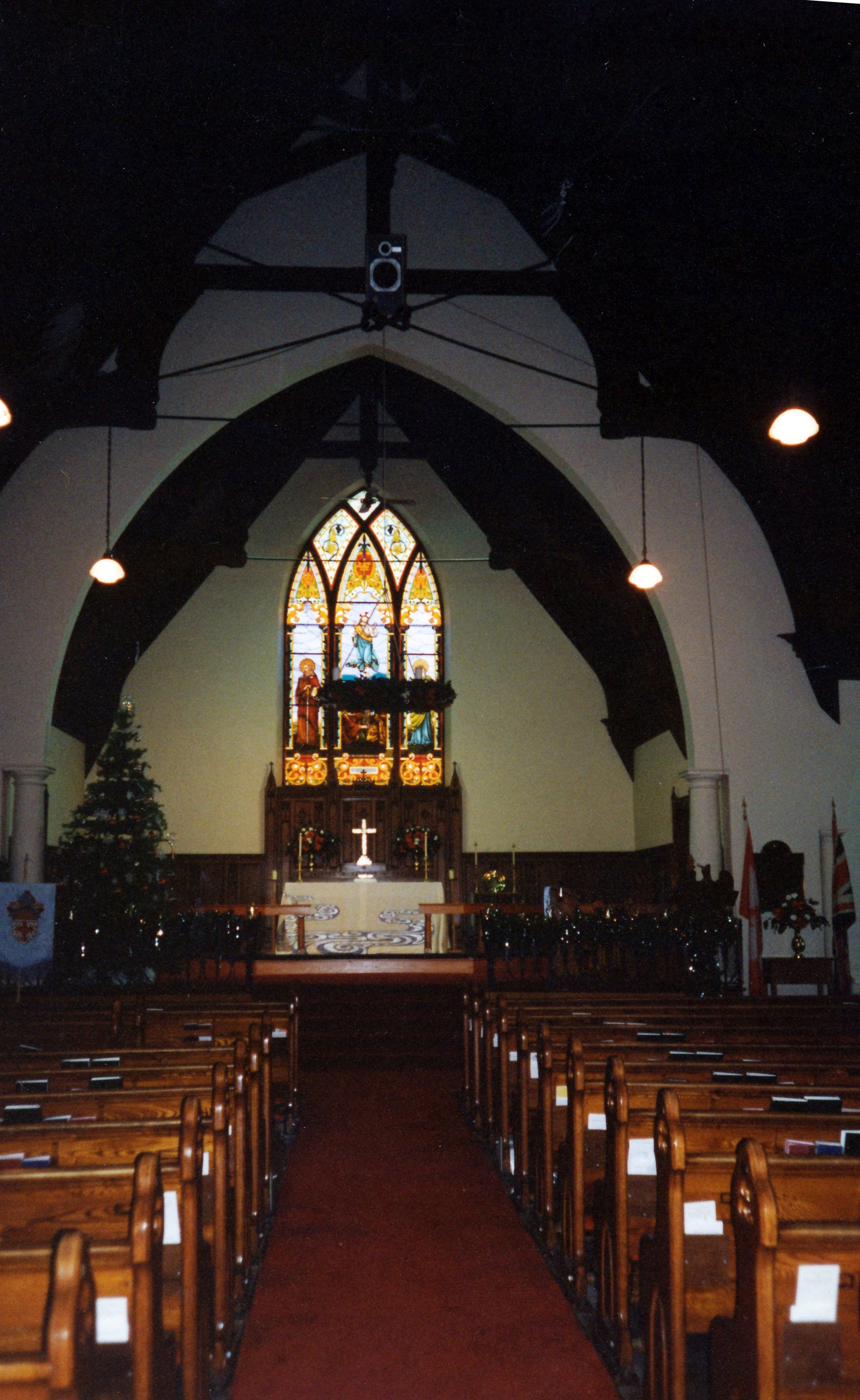
St Paul's Cathedral, Regina, interior in December, decorated for Christmas

The Diocese of Qu'Appelle owned a substantial property in Regina on College Avenue at Broad Street which has now been sold to the civil province of Saskatchewan in order that the diocese finally achieve financial independence, it originally having been financially underwritten by the Church of England Diocese of Lichfield as a mission diocese, though Lichfield quickly became bored with this responsibility and gave it clearly to be understood that it expected Qu'Appelle to become self-sustaining.

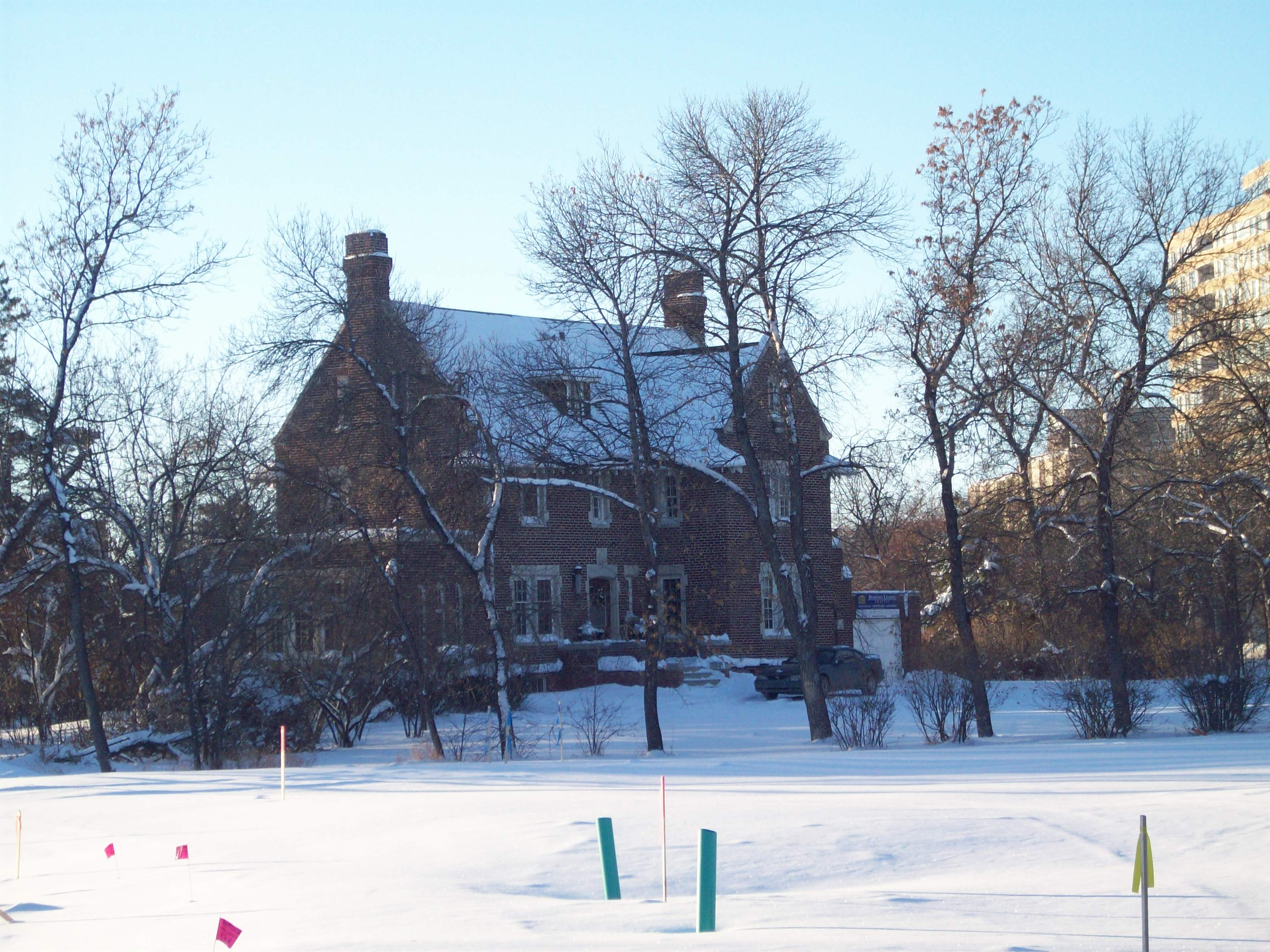
Bishop's Court, Regina, January 2010, immediately east of and parallel to the intended site of the diocesan cathedral. Not occupied since the episcopacy of Eric Bays.

The diocesan offices, the former St Chad's Qu'Appelle Diocesan School, an old people's home, the former bishop's palace and other diocesan structures dating from a time when the Anglican Church had ambitions for the prairies which now seem unrealistic, remained on the site, rented back from the provincial Crown until into the 21st century. Of some historical interest is the ambitious cathedral site laid out diagonally at the corner of Broad Street and College Avenue, still clearly outlined in hedges.

In recent years the Anglican Church of Canada has deliberated over the desirability of rationalising its administrative structures. With its 29 (or 30, depending on how one designates the Parishes of the British Columbia Central Interior, the former Diocese of Cariboo) it may be somewhat top-heavy with episcopacy given its small numbers outside Ontario and the Maritimes. By comparison, the Anglican Church of Australia, with far more members, has far fewer dioceses, for example — and the future of St Paul's as a cathedral may be in doubt.

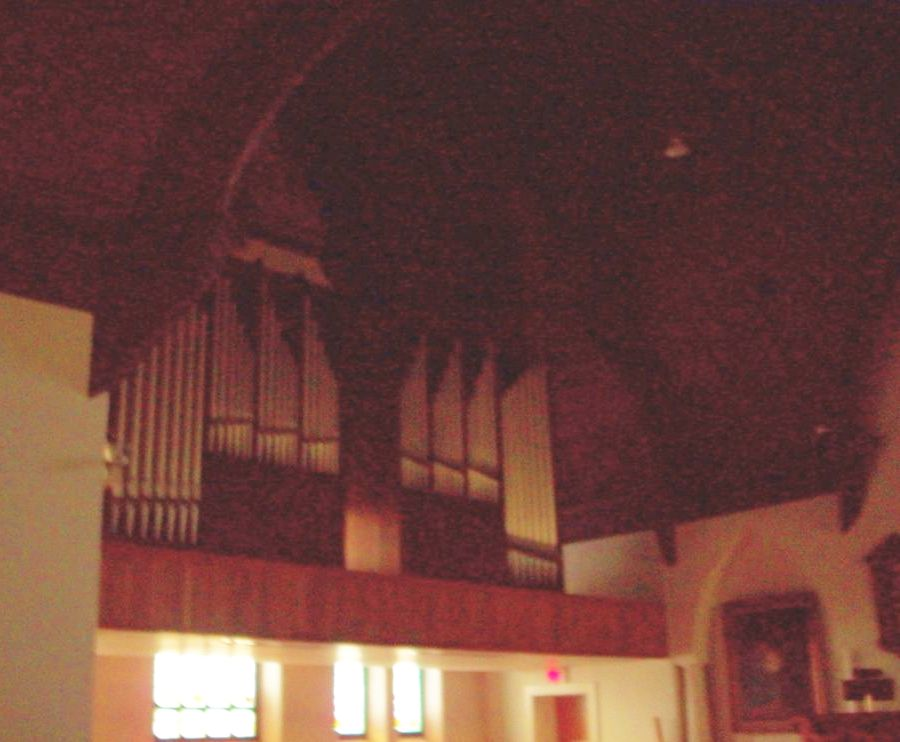
Organ, north transept, first played May 4, 1974

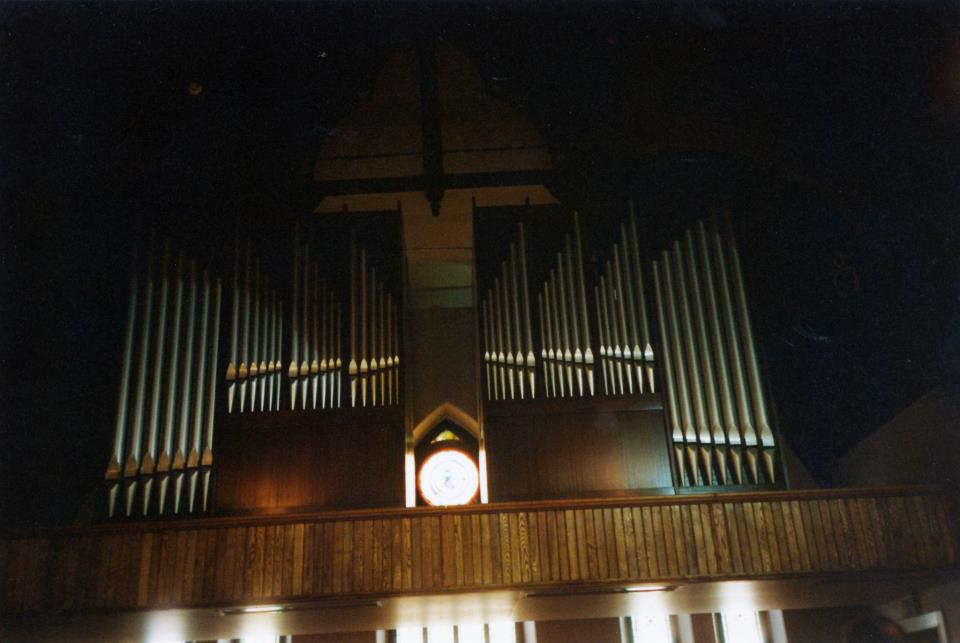
Organ, north transept

By 1973 it was apparent that the diocese could never be self-supporting other than by alienating its only substantial real estate and that the original ambition to build a sizable cathedral in Regina could never be realised. St Paul's was then formally upgraded to cathedral status and a satisfactory 2-manual Casavant Frères organ built under then-organist Donald M. Kendrick and Dean James Allan, a gift of the Whitmore family of $20,000. The new Casavant organ was first played on the first Sunday of May 1974 when the Rev. Michael Peers arrived from Winnipeg to replace James Allan as dean.

The previous organ pipes had been located north of the chancel with the console on the south within the chancel, the instrument at the southeast corner of the chancel, just inside the doorway into the south chapel. The choir members were placed on the north and south of the chancel, west of the altar. The pipes of the 1974 organ are above the north transept and the console has been variously positioned in the north and south transepts. The original organ chamber behind the pulpit has been converted to a sacristy and a painting hangs where pipes were once visible.

The church basement has been substantially enlarged and converted to a Buddhist-style columbarium, with niches for cremated ashes arrayed post office-style around the perimeter: According to the cathedral's website, "...[T]he Columbarium is a permanent part of the church structure and serves as sanctuary for the cremated remains of individuals and families. The access-controlled, indoor facility provides year-round safety which is carefully monitored by church staff."

== St Paul's in the wider ecclesiastical and secular community ==
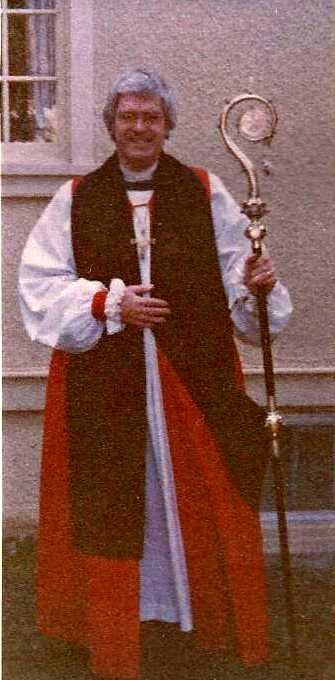
Michael Peers at St. Paul's Dean's residence in Regina after election as Bishop of Qu'Appelle

The cathedral has been something of a launching pad for ecclesiastical and artistic careers: Michael Coleman, Fredric Jackson and Duncan Wallace, past bishops of Qu'Appelle, had previously been deans of Qu'Appelle and rectors of St Paul's; James Allan was dean of Qu'Appelle before his election as bishop of Keewatin; Michael Peers, later bishop and archbishop of Qu'Appelle (1977–86) and primate of Canada (1986–2004) was dean from 1974 to 1977.

Donald M. Kendrick of Calgary, Alberta, subsequently conductor of the Bach-Elgar Choir in Hamilton, Ontario and of the faculty of California State University, Sacramento, was organist and choirmaster during the mid-1970s; during his tenure at St Paul's and the then-University of Saskatchewan, Regina Campus, St Paul's was the centre of liturgical music in Regina, and a generation of Canadian choral and keyboard musicians was trained and continue to contribute to Canadian and world music. It was at Mr Kendrick's instance, with the enthusiastic support of Dean Allan and the financial underwriting by the Whitmore family, that the current small but fine Casavant Frères organ was installed in north transept of the cathedral in May 1974.

== Deans of Qu'Appelle ==
The dean of Qu'Appelle is also rector of St Paul's.

- ?–1970: Fredric Jackson (Bishop of Qu'Appelle, 1960)
- 1970–1974: James Allan (Bishop of Keewatin, 1974)
- 1974–1977: Michael Peers (Bishop of Qu'Appelle, 1977)
- 1978–1997: Duncan Wallace (Bishop of Qu'Appelle, 1997)
- 1998–2011: James Merrett
- 2011–present: Mike Sinclair

== See also ==
- Diocese of Qu'Appelle
- Anglican Church of Canada
- District of Assiniboia
