= Lofthouse =

Lofthouse may refer to:

== Locations ==
- Lofthouse, North Yorkshire
- Lofthouse, West Yorkshire
- Lofthouse, a former name of Loftus, North Yorkshire
- Lofthouse and Outwood railway station

== People ==
- Alan Lofthouse, South African bowler
- Andrew Lofthouse, Australian news presenter
- Geoffrey Lofthouse, Baron Lofthouse of Pontefract (1925–2012), British politician
- James Lofthouse (footballer, born 1894), British footballer
- Joe Lofthouse (1865–1919), English footballer
- Joseph Lofthouse, Jr. (1880–1962), Canadian bishop
- Joseph Lofthouse, Sr. (1855–1933), Canadian bishop
- Joy Lofthouse (1923-2017), British WW2 pilot
- Mark Lofthouse (born 1957), Canadian ice hockey player
- Nat Lofthouse (1925–2011), British footballer

== Other ==
- Lofthouse Colliery disaster
- Lofthouse of Fleetwood, a British company which manufactures Fisherman's Friend lozenges

== See also ==
- Loftus (disambiguation)
