= Selwyn Dewdney =

Canadian writer, artist, and activist

Selwyn Hanington Dewdney (October 22, 1909 – November 18, 1979) was a Canadian writer, illustrator, artist, activist and pioneer in both art therapy and pictography.

== Early life ==
Selwyn Hanington Dewdney was born in Prince Albert, Saskatchewan, on October 22, 1909, and was the son of Alfred Dewdney, bishop of the diocese of Keewatin from 1921 to 1938. His family moved to Kenora, Ontario, in 1924 and he received his secondary education there. He attended the University of Toronto where he received a general Bachelor of Arts in astronomy and English.

In the summer of 1928, he accompanied his father on a 3,800 mile journey to visit the Ojibway and Cree religious missions in the diocese of Keewatin in Northern Ontario. Much of this venture was travelled by canoe. This experience established his interest in native culture and love of the bush in the Canadian Shield. He spent the summer months of 1929 and 1930 as the student-in-charge at the Lac Seul mission in the Lac Seul First Nation, on the shores of Lac Seul in Northwestern Ontario while he was a Masters student in Theology at Wycliffe College, University of Toronto. During this time, according to his diary, he debated the idea of whether to be trained to be a missionary. Being student-in-charge meant that he had to hold religious services both at Lac Seul and Hudson under the supervision of Canon Maurice Sanderson. The Lac Seul Mission was his appointment after ordination in Northwestern Ontario. He spent both summers making canoe trips getting to know the locale. In 1932, he attended the Ontario College of Education and received a High School Assistant's Certificate and Art Specialists Certificate. He also took a course in landscape painting.

== Later life ==
In 1933, he was hired by the Geological Survey of Canada, and was assigned to survey the transition zone between the Precambrian formations of the Canadian Shield and the Hudson Bay lowlands. Among the muskeg and blackflies, he sketched the landscape and produced pencil portraits of the traverse crew at the survey camp. His inspiration as an artist came from the great northern landscapes that he loved to visit. His dramatic style is quite similar to that of the Group of Seven. In 1934, he attended the Ontario College of Art, graduating with honors, and moved to London, Ontario, Canada.

== Family ==
In 1936, he married Irene Donner in a ceremony conducted by his father. Their honeymoon was a 500-mile canoe trip loop from Kenora to Red Lake. Their children were:

- Donner Dewdney, a child psychiatrist, known for discovering the facial distortion effect among schizophrenic children
- Alexander Dewdney, a mathematician, author, conservationist, environmental scientist and naturalist
- Peter Dewdney, a photographer and gold prospector
- Christopher Dewdney, an award-winning poet and non-fiction author

== Teaching ==
In 1936, he began teaching at Sir Adam Beck Secondary School, London, Ontario, but resigned in protest at the demotion of a colleague in 1945. This experience was the subject of his first novel, Wind Without Rain.

== Commissioned works ==
One of the first London artists to paint abstracts in the 1940s and early 1950s, Dewdney painted a number of murals on commission for several clients, including Sir Adam Beck Collegiate and Victorian Hospital. Around 1950, he painted a mural in the lobby of the General Motors Electro-Motive Division plant in London. The mural was to be removed for preservation by Museum London after the company offered it following closure of the plant in 2012.

== Art therapy ==
With a growing family of three sons, he turned to illustrating books, writing, researching, editing and painting commissioned murals to support them. It was during this time that he became interested in art therapy when he was commissioned to illustrate Lionel Penrose's psychiatric 'M' test. In 1947, while working at Westminster Veterans Hospital in London, he began giving art instruction to some to the psychiatric patients. The positive results of this eventually afforded him the position of Psychiatric Art Therapist. He and his wife Irene were pioneers in the field of Canadian art therapy. His work, and particularly his wife's, led to the development of an art therapy training program at the University of Western Ontario in 1986.

== Rock art ==
During the 1950s, his ongoing exploration of Northern Ontario introduced him to the ancient native pictographs painted in red ochre on the rocks. A chance meeting with Kenneth E. Kidd, curator of the Ethnology Department of the Royal Ontario Museum, led to an opportunity to join Kidd and help record the pictograph sites. By 1957, eleven rock-painting sites were recorded in Quetico Provincial Park. Between 1959 and 1965, with two of his sons as field assistants, he discovered and recorded rock art from the foothills of the Rockies to the Atlantic coast. By 1978, he had visited 301 sites in Canada and the U.S. In 1962, the first edition of Indian Rock Paintings of the Great Lakes was published, with Kenneth Kidd as his co-author.

== The Sacred Scrolls ==
Dewdney learned of a secret society within the Ojibway, the Midewiwin, which purportedly embodied traditional ceremonial rituals of healing and sorcery and included four degrees of initiation. It is believed that some essential elements of the Midewiwin, which was first documented by Europeans in the early 18th century, were "elaborations of traditional Anishinaabe beliefs and practices".

Elements of this belief system were recorded on scrolls made of birch bark, sewn together with cedar roots. His The Sacred Scrolls of the Southern Ojibway (1975), remains the only volume dedicated exclusively to this subject.

== Norval Morrisseau ==
In 1960, Dewdney met Norval Morrisseau, a young native artist, and his encouragement and support helped promote Morrisseau as the country's best known Woodland artist. Dewdney edited Morrisseau's book Legends of My People. Dewdney wrote article about him in 1963 and 1965. At one time, Morrisseau and his family lived with Dewdney and his family at their home on Erie Avenue in London.

== Last years ==
In 1978, he published his second novel, Christopher Breton. He died on November 18, 1979, following heart surgery. In 1980, two stands of white pine were planted at Agawa Bay in Lake Superior Provincial Park by the Ministry of Natural Resources to honor his memory. A plaque erected by the family stands against the Shield rock he loved so much, a few meters away from the Ojibway pictograph Mishibizhiw, the great horned lynx. In 1997, Selwyn's son, Alexander K. Dewdney, published Daylight in the Swamp, based on his father's bush diary, field notes and letters. Selwyn was working on the original manuscript for the book at the time of his death.

== Selected bibliography ==
- 1946: Wind Without Rain. Toronto: Copp Clark
- 1960: The Map That Grew. Toronto: Oxford University Press
- 1962: Indian rock paintings of the Great Lakes with Kidd, Kenneth E. Toronto: University of Toronto Press.
- 1967: Indian Paintings of the Great Lakes. Second edition. Published for the Quetico Foundation. Toronto: University of Toronto Press. ISBN 0802031722
- 1975: The Sacred Scrolls of the Southern Ojibway. Published for the Glenbow-Alberta Institute, Calgary, Alberta. Toronto: The University of Toronto Press. ISBN 0802033210
- 1975: They Shared to Survive: The Native Peoples of Canada. Illustrated by Franklin Arbuckle. Toronto: The MacMillan Company of Canada Ltd. Hardcover, ISBN 0770513492; Softcover, ISBN 0770513204
- 1978: Christopher Breton. Toronto: McClelland and Stewart. ISBN 0771026986.
- 1980: The Hungry Time. Toronto: James Lorimer & Company, Publishers. Hardcover, ISBN 0888622619; Softcover, ISBN 0888622627
- 1997: Daylight in the Swamp: Memoirs of Selwyn Dewdney. (A.K. Dewdney Ed.). Dunburn. Hardback ISBN 9781550022513.

== Links ==
- biography at BookRags; accessed April 4, 2014.
