= Tom Collings =

British-born Canadian Anglican bishop (1938–2014)

The Right Reverend Tom Collings
- 7th Bishop of Keewatin
- Church: Anglican Church of Canada
- Province: Rupert's Land
- Diocese: Keewatin
- In office: 1991–1996
- Predecessor: James Allan
- Successor: Gordon Beardy

Orders
- Ordination: 1979 (deacon); 1980 (priest)
- Consecration: 1991 by Walter H. Jones

Personal details
- Born: 2 December 1938 Abergavenny, Wales
- Died: 8 July 2014 (aged 75) Winnipeg, Manitoba, Canada
- Buried: Kaleida, Manitoba, Canada
- Denomination: Anglicanism
- Spouse: Julie Black Collings (m. c. 1965)
- Education: St Peter's College, Oxford; Wycliffe Hall, Oxford; Union Theological Seminary; University of Essex

Thomas William Ralph Collings (2 December 1938 – 8 July 2014), known as Tom Collings, was a British-born Canadian Anglican bishop. He served as the seventh Bishop of Keewatin from 1991 to 1996.

Born in Wales, Collings was educated at the University of Oxford in England and Union Theological Seminary in the United States before returning to England to study at the University of Essex. He taught mathematics at a number of British universities and spent several years as deputy director of a research unit at University of Strathclyde. Collings was ordained to the diaconate in Scotland in 1979 and to the presbyterate in Canada in 1980. He first served as an assistant priest at St John's Cathedral in Winnipeg, Manitoba, and went on to serve a variety of Manitoban parishes, most of which had a significant indigenous population.

Collings became Bishop of Keewatin in 1991 and served in that role in the Kenora, Ontario–based diocese until 1996.

== Early life and career ==
Collings was born on 2 December 1938 in Abergavenny, Wales. He was raised attending his father's Baptist Sunday school and his mother's Anglican church. He was educated at Monmouth School before moving to England to attend the University of Oxford. There he obtained a Bachelor of Arts degree in mathematics in 1961 following studies at St Peter's College and a Bachelor of Arts degree in theology in 1963 following studies at Wycliffe Hall. In 1963, Collings was awarded a Harkness Fellowship and moved to New York City to attend Union Theological Seminary. While in New York, he met and married his wife Julie and, in 1965, obtained a Master of Sacred Theology degree under the supervision of Reinhold Niebuhr. After his graduation from the seminary, he moved back to the United Kingdom and obtained a Bachelor of Science degree in mathematics from the University of Essex.

Collings went on to teach mathematics at North East London Polytechnic, the University of Strathclyde, and Open University. He served for several years as the deputy director for the (Scottish) Health Services Operations Research Unit at the University of Strathclyde.

Collings and his wife had five children: Megan Collings-Moore (who was ordained to the diaconate and to the presbyterate by her father), Bronwen Bugden, Tamsin Collings (who married former provincial attorney general Andrew Swan), John Collings, and David Collings.

== Ordained ministry ==
Collings was ordained to the diaconate in the Scottish Episcopal Church in 1979 and to the presbyterate in the Anglican Church of Canada in 1980. After moving to Winnipeg, Manitoba, with his wife and children, he began his presbyteral ministry as an assistant priest at St John's Cathedral from 1980 to 1982. From 1982 to 1985, he was rector of Peguis/Hodgson, a six-point parish in rural Manitoba where he had a ministry with indigenous people. Until his election to the episcopacy in 1991, Collings had served as the Dean of Theology of St John's College at the University of Manitoba, as well as the coordinator of their native theological education program and the director of their lay education program. He was also a non-stipendiary priest-in-charge of St Helen's Ayamihewkamik (Ayamihewkamik being Cree for place of worship) in Winnipeg in 1987.

Collings was elected to be the seventh Bishop of Keewatin in 1991 and was consecrated and installed the same year. He continued serving as ordinary of the Kenora, Ontario–based diocese until 1996.

Following his retirement from the See of Keewatin, he and his wife, the priest Julie Black Collings, accepted a charge in Weyburn, Saskatchewan, in the Diocese of Qu'Appelle, where they undertook ministry development work. They later moved back to Winnipeg, where they continued their involvement in indigenous ministry and where they volunteered with St Thomas' Church, Weston. He was also involved with a prison ministry. Collings died on 8 July 2014 in Winnipeg and was buried in St. Mary's-St. Alban's Cemetery in Kaleida, Manitoba.

Anglican Communion titles
Preceded by James Allan	Bishop of Keewatin; 1991–1996	Succeeded by Gordon Beardy
