= St Albans Cathedral (disambiguation) =

St Albans Cathedral is an Anglican cathedral in Hertfordshire, England.

Other similarly named Anglican cathedrals are:

- St Albans Cathedral (Pretoria), South Africa
- St. Alban's Cathedral (Kenora), Ontario, Canada, a church (no longer a cathedral)
- St. Alban's Cathedral (Prince Albert, Saskatchewan), Canada, in the Diocese of Saskatchewan
