= Loftus =

Loftus may refer to:

== People ==
- Loftus (surname), a list of people with the surname
- Loftus (given name), a list of people with the given name

== Places ==
- Loftus, New South Wales, a suburb of Sydney, Australia
- Loftus, North Yorkshire, a town in Redcar and Cleveland, England
- Loftus Glacier, Victoria Land, Antarctica

== Titles ==
- Viscount Loftus, a title created three times in the Peerage of Ireland
- Baron Loftus, a title in the Peerage of the United Kingdom
- Loftus baronets, two baronetcies in Ireland
- Earl of Ely, three creations to the Loftus family in Ireland

== Transportation ==
- Loftus Street, a major north–south road the Perth suburbs of Subiaco and West Perth, Western Australia
- Loftus railway station, Sydney, Australia
- Loftus railway station, Yorkshire, a disused railway station in Redcar and Cleveland, England

== Arts and entertainment ==
- Loftus (band), an American indie rock band
- Professor Geoffrey Loftus, a character in the British comedy series Doctor in the House

== See also ==
- Loftus Hall, a building in County Wexford, Ireland, that is said to have been haunted by the devil
- Loftus Road, a football stadium in London, the home ground of Queens Park Rangers
- Loftus Versfeld Stadium, Pretoria, South Africa
- Lofthouse (disambiguation)
