= John Grisdale (bishop) =

British Anglican bishop (1845–1922)

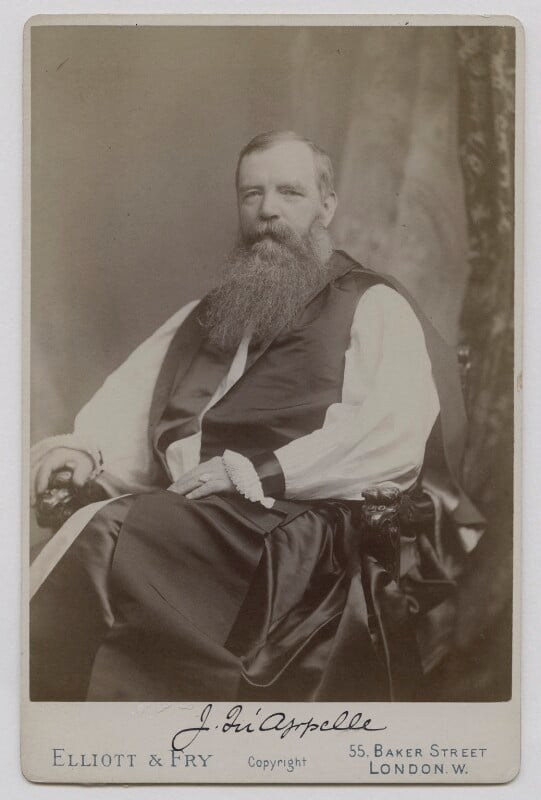
Grisdale c. 1900

John Grisdale (25 June 1845 – 27 January 1922) was an Anglican colonial bishop in the late 19th century.

Grisdale was born in Bolton, Lancashire, on 25 June 1845 and educated at the Missionary College in Islington. He was ordained in 1870.

After a year in India as a missionary he emigrated to Canada where he was Rector of Holy Trinity, Winnipeg. He was later Professor of Theology at St John’s College, Winnipeg and then Dean of Rupert's Land before being ordained to the episcopate as the third Bishop of Qu’Appelle. He died on 27 January 1922.

== Notes ==
Anglican Communion titles
Preceded by William John Burn	Bishop of Qu’Appelle; 1896–1911	Succeeded by Malcolm Taylor McAdam Harding
