= Donald Kendrick =

Canadian music director (born 1947)

Donald M. Kendrick (born 1947, Calgary, Alberta) is Music Director at Sacred Heart Church in Sacramento, California, where he conducts the Schola Cantorum and Vox Nova (Men's Chorus), and Founder and Artistic Director of the Sacramento Choral Society and Orchestra (a more-than-150-voice volunteer/auditioned symphony chorus and professional orchestra). From 1985–2018, Kendrick was Director of Choral Activities at California State University, Sacramento. In 2007 he was named Outstanding Teacher of the Year by the Capitol Section of the California Music Educators Association (CMEA). He is also the founder and past artistic director of the Sacramento Children's Chorus.

== Life ==
Kendrick taught, led choirs and played the organ in Regina, Saskatchewan. He was on the faculty at the University of Saskatchewan, Regina Campus (now the University of Regina), and was the organist and choirmaster at St. Paul's Cathedral (Regina). He led the choral section of the summer arts school at Fort San, Saskatchewan, was organist and choirmaster at Christ's Church Anglican Cathedral in Hamilton, Ontario where he conducted the Bach-Elgar Choir, and established the Hamilton Children's Choir. He also conducted the Canadian Children's Opera Chorus.

Kendrick studied at the American Conservatory of Music (bachelor's degree), New England Conservatory of Music (master's degree), Stanford University (graduate studies), and the Eastman School of Music (Doctor of Musical Arts). He also hold the American Guild of Organists CHM (choirmaster) certificate, and he received the American Choral Federation in New York’s Louise Rogers Goucher Memorial Scholarship.

In addition to Sacramento State and the University of Saskatchewan, Regina Campus, Kendrick has served on the faculties of the Eastman School of Music, Louisiana State University, and the University of the Pacific Conservatory of Music.

== Guest appearances and tours ==
Kendrick debuted in Carnegie Hall with the Verdi Requiem in 1995 and has frequently been featured on Canadian Broadcasting Corporation radio as a recitalist and conductor. He has been active as a guest conductor and adjudicator for choral festivals throughout Canada and the United States. His choirs have toured Austria, Canada, China, the Czech Republic, Germany, and Hungary.
