= John Burn (bishop) =

Anglican bishop (1851–1896)

- Bishop of Qu’Appelle
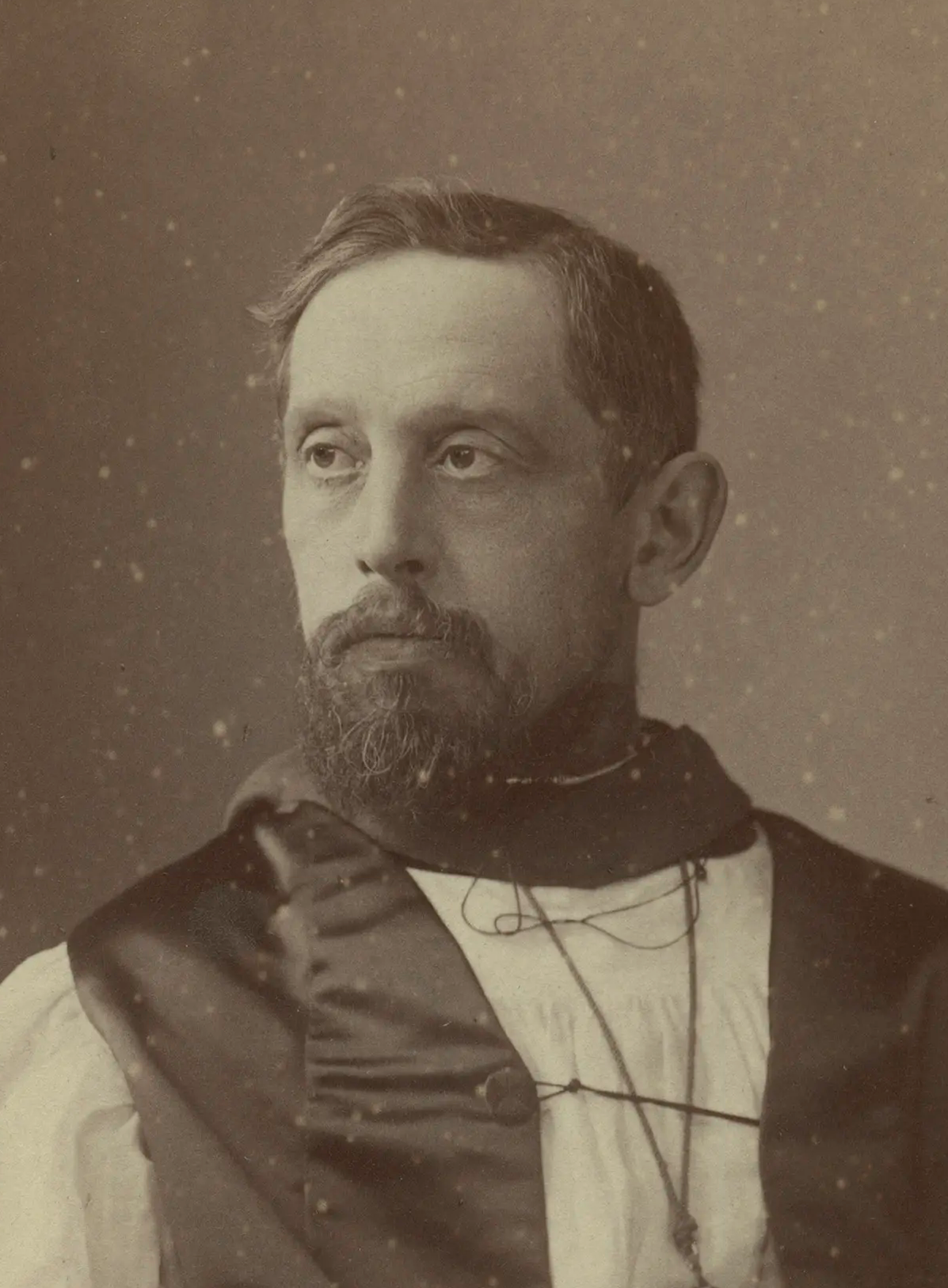
- Carte-de-visite by Elliott & Fry
- Diocese: Diocese of Qu'Appelle
- In office: 1893–1896 (d.)
- Predecessor: Adelbert Anson
- Successor: John Grisdale

Orders
- Consecration: 1893 by Edward White Benson (Canterbury)

Personal details
- Born: 28 October 1851 Durham, County Durham, UK
- Died: 18 June 1896 (aged 44)
- Denomination: Anglican
- Education: St John's College, Cambridge

William John Burn (28 October 1851 – 18 June 1896) was an Anglican colonial bishop in the late 19th century.

Burn was born in Durham, England and educated at St John's College, Cambridge, he was ordained in 1875. His first posts were curacies at St Andrew's Church, Chesterton and St Paul's Church, Jarrow. From 1881 to 1893 he was Vicar of St Peter's, Jarrow then St Edwin Coniscliffe

In 1893 Burn was elevated to the episcopate as the second bishop of Qu’Appelle. He was consecrated a bishop on 24 March 1893, by Edward White Benson, Archbishop of Canterbury, at Westminster Abbey. He arrived to take up his post Burn arrived in Qu'Appelle, Assiniboia (now Saskatchewan) on 20 May of that year, soon moved Bishop's Court from Qu'Appelle to Indian Head some 15 kilometres to the east, and served there until his death. He died at Indian Head and was buried at Qu'Appelle, whose parish church had retained pro-cathedral status.

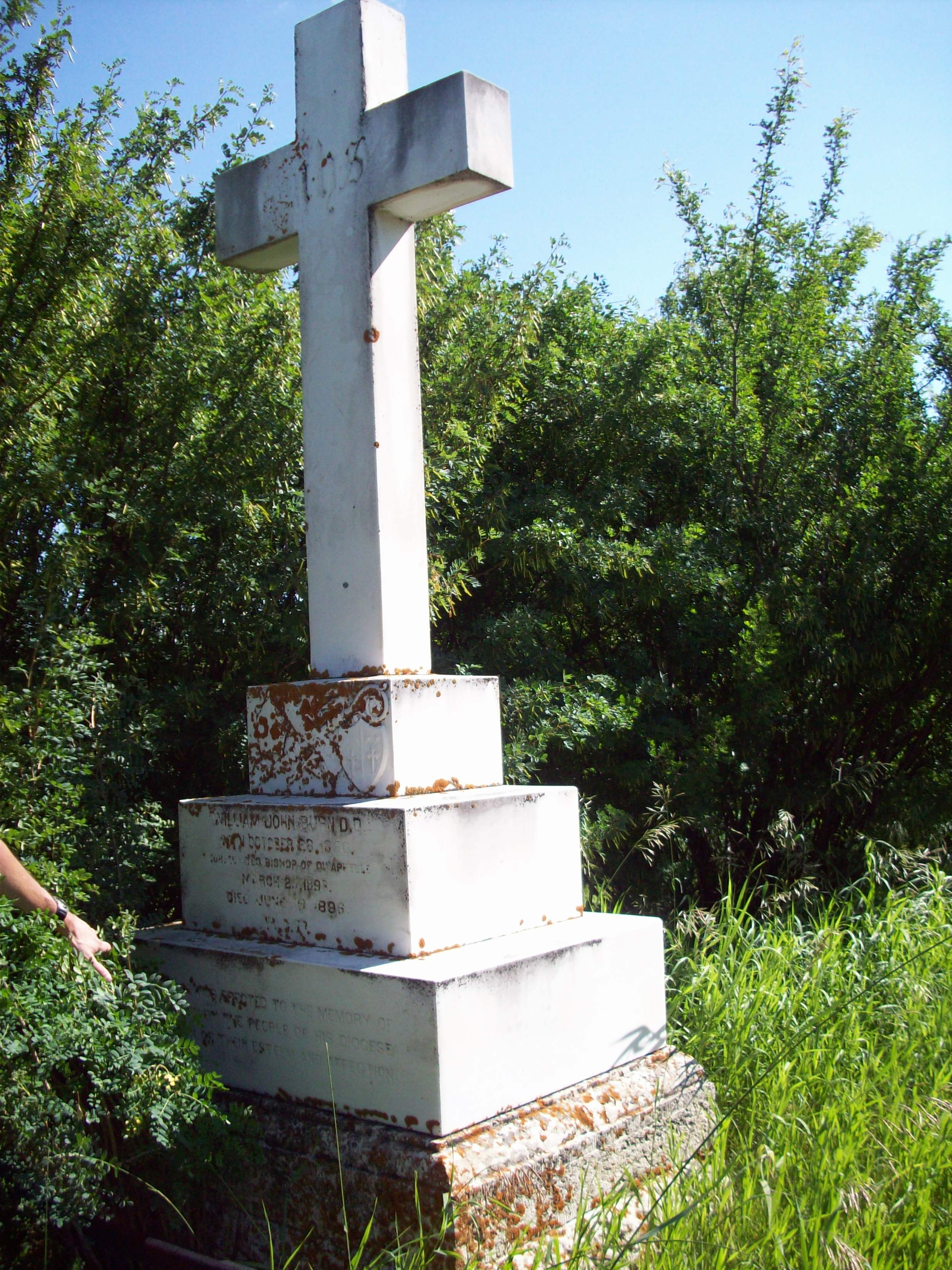
Grave of Bishop John Burn, Qu'Appelle, Saskatchewan.

Burn had a positive influence on the Anglican Diocese of Qu'Appelle in his short tenure. He improved the unity of the prairie Anglicans and also put the Diocese on a more secure economic footing.

Anglican Communion titles
Preceded by Adelbert Anson	Bishop of Qu’Appelle; 1893–1896	Succeeded by John Grisdale
