= Fredric Jackson =

George Fredric Clarence Jackson (also spelt Frederic and seldom Frederick; 5 July 1907 – 24 December 1990) was an Anglican bishop in the second half of the 20th century.

Educated at the University of Toronto and ordained in 1935, his first post was a curacy at Erin, Ontario. After this he held incumbencies in Halton Hills and Halton Hills. He was then appointed Dean before being made Bishop of Qu'Appelle. In 1970 he was elected Metropolitan of Rupert's Land and Archbishop of Qu’Appelle. He concurrently held the post of Bishop Ordinary to the Armed Forces and also served the Royal Canadian Mounted Police (RCMP) training centre, frequently conducting services in its chapel. Upon his retirement, he lived at the resort community of Katepwa on Katepwa Lake in the Qu'Appelle Valley and served as mayor of the community for several years. His and his wife's son Michael Jackson has for many years been and remains a Deacon at St Paul's Cathedral, Regina.

== Notes ==
Anglican Communion titles
Preceded by Michael Coleman	Bishop of Qu’Appelle; 1960–1976	Succeeded by Michael Peers
Preceded by Howard Clark	Metropolitan of Rupert’s Land; 1971–1976	Succeeded by Frederick Crabb
