= Edwin Knowles =

Anglican bishop (1874-1962)

Edwin Hubert Knowles
- Born: 7 June 1874; Koskelle Estate, Badulla, British Ceylon
- Died: 27 October 1962 (aged 88); Regina, Saskatchewan, Canada
- Title: Bishop of Qu'Appelle
- Parents: Edwin Knowles (father); Martha Jane Bassett (mother)

Edwin Hubert Knowles (7 June 1874 – 27 October 1962) was an Anglican bishop in the second quarter of the 20th century.

Knowles was born at Koskelle Estate, Badulla, in British Ceylon (now Sri Lanka) on 7 June 1874, the son of Edwin Knowles and his wife, Martha Jane Bassett.

His father died at sea, near Aden, on a voyage from England to Ceylon, on 11 July 1879.

He came to Canada with his mother and siblings in 1891 and was educated at the University of Manitoba, where he graduated with the degree of Bachelor of Laws.

He was ordained deacon in the Church of England in Canada in 1905 and priest in 1906 by the Bishop of Qu'Appelle.

He served as curate (1905–1906) and rector (1906–1909) of Buffalo Lake; Incumbent of Kamsack (1909–1911); Diocesan Secretary (1911–1935); Examining Chaplain to the Bishop of Qu’Appelle (1909–1935); Canon of the Pro-Cathedral Church of St. Peter, Qu'Appelle (1914–1918), Chaplain to the Royal Canadian Mounted Police (1918–1956), and Archdeacon of Qu'Appelle (1918–1935).

He was consecrated as fifth Bishop of Qu'Appelle on 24 June 1935.

He retired in 1950, and spent his last years in Regina, Saskatchewan. He died on 27 October 1962.

== Arms ==
Coat of arms of Edwin Knowles
Crest An elephant statant Sable tusked Argent holding in the trunk a garb Or, upon a rock proper semé of Passion nails Or. Escutcheon Or on a pile between two roses Gules a cross crosslet fitché Or. Motto IN HOC SIGNO VINCES (Latin for 'In this sign you will win')

== See also ==
Anglican Communion titles
Preceded by Malcolm Harding	Bishop of Qu'Appelle; 1935–1950	Succeeded by Michael Coleman
