= Adelbert Anson =

Anglican Bishop (1840–1909)

Anson in the late 19th century.

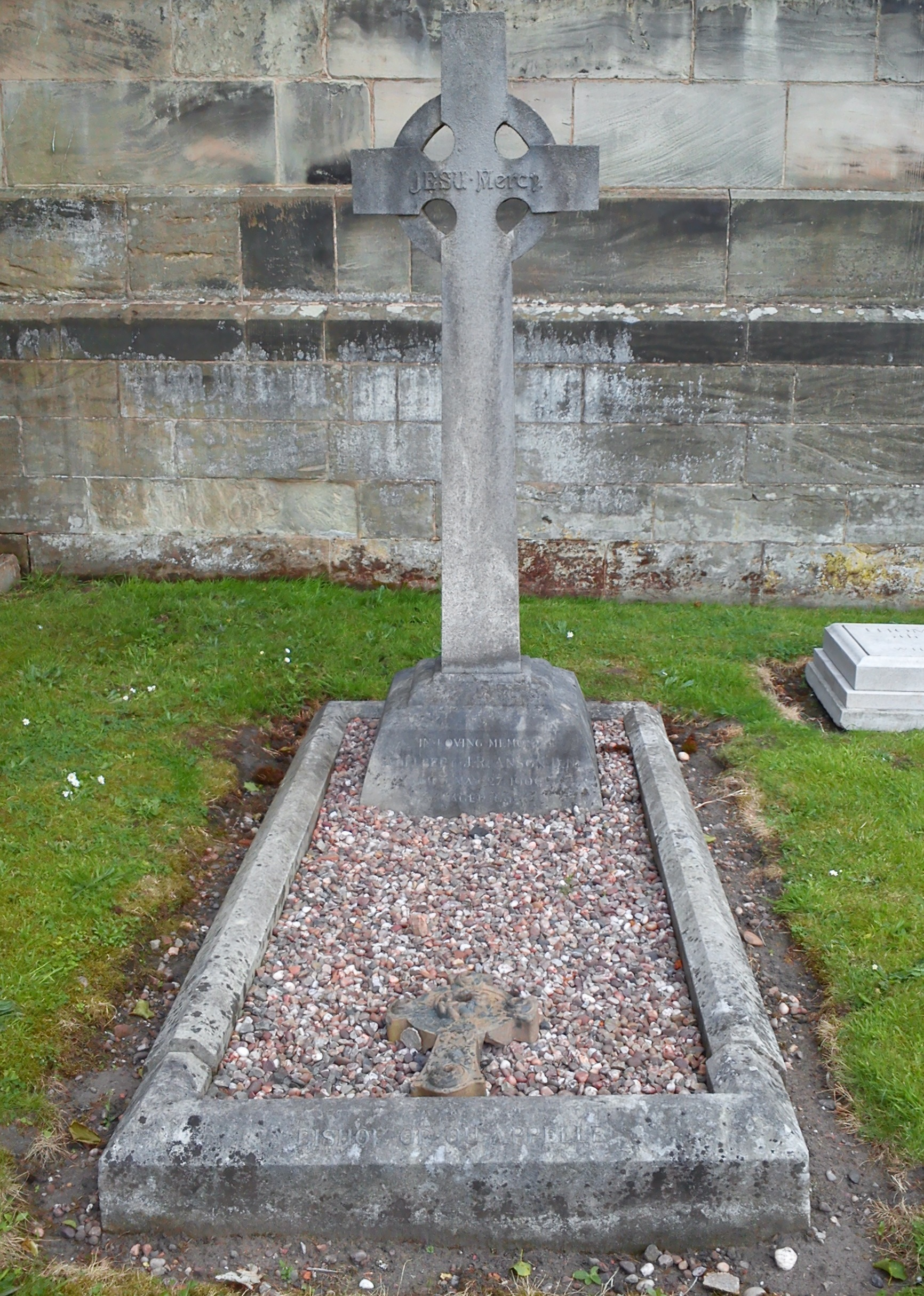
Grave of Bishop Adelbert Anson

Rev. Hon. Adelbert John Robert Anson DD (20 December 1840 – 27 May 1909) was a clergyman from the Anson family. He served as an Anglican bishop in late 19th century western Canada.

== Early life ==
Anson was born in St James's Square, Westminster, the fourth and youngest son of Thomas Anson, 1st Earl of Lichfield, by Louisa Catherine Philips, daughter of Nathaniel Philips, of Slebech Hall, Pembrokeshire. Thomas Anson, 2nd Earl of Lichfield and the Honourable Augustus Anson were his elder brothers. He was educated at Eton and Christ Church, Oxford, and was ordained in 1865.

== Career ==
Anson's first posts were curacies at Wolverhampton and Bilston. From 1875 to 1883 he was Rector of St Mary Magdalene Woolwich before being appointed to the episcopate; he was consecrated a bishop by Edward White Benson, Archbishop of Canterbury, at St Mary-at-Lambeth on 24 June 1884 (Midsummer, or St John the Baptist's Day).

In his time as Bishop of Qu'Appelle, then in the District of Assiniboia in the North-West Territories and to become part of the Province of Saskatchewan when that was created in 1905, he engendered vast indignation and hostility among local natives and with the headquarters of the then-Church of England in Canada. He openly and publicly declared that it was a vast advantage that his region of the Canadian prairies was blessed with English migrants in addition to trivial native colonials.

Returning to England in 1892 he was Master of St John's Hospital, Lichfield until 1898. He died on 27 May 1909. A controversial figure in his diocese, at least among native Canadian farmers and townspeople, he encouraged the small English community to stand fast and remain aloof from Ontario-born, Country-born, Scottish, Irish, French and aboriginal people.

Anson is buried in the churchyard of St Michael and All Angels in Colwich, Staffordshire.

Anglican Communion titles
| New title | Bishop of Qu'Appelle; 1884–1892 | Succeeded by John Burn |
