= Duncan Wallace =

Former Bishop of the Anglican Church of Canada

The Right Reverend Duncan Wallace B.A., M.Div.
- Bishop of Qu'Appelle
- Church: Anglican Church of Canada
- Diocese: Qu'Appelle
- See: Regina, Saskatchewan
- Elected: 1997
- Term ended: 2005
- Predecessor: Eric Bays
- Successor: Greg Kerr-Wilson
- Other posts: Dean of Qu’Appelle and Rector of St. Paul’s Cathedral, Regina (1978 - 1997)

Personal details
- Born: March 1, 1938 Kitchener, Ontario
- Died: June 22, 2015 (aged 77) Regina, Saskatchewan
- Denomination: Anglican
- Residence: Regina, Saskatchewan
- Spouse: Mary Emily (Warriner)
- Children: Lisa, Andrew

Duncan Douglas Wallace (March 1, 1938 - June 22, 2015) was the 10th Bishop of Qu'Appelle in the Anglican Church of Canada.

== Early life and education ==
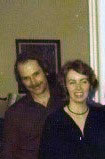
Duncan and Mary Wallace in Milton ON, 1976

Born in Kitchener, Ontario in 1938, Wallace was raised and educated in Winnipeg, Manitoba. He obtained a Bachelor of Arts degree from the University of Winnipeg and a Master of Divinity degree from St. John's College, Winnipeg. He was ordained a deacon in 1964 and priest in 1965.

Wallace married Mary Emily Warriner, a teacher and eventually a principal with the Regina Public School Division. They had two children, Lisa and Andrew.

== Pastoral Service ==
Wallace's first ministry was at Fairford First Nations Mission, from 1965 to 1969, followed by St. Anne's, Winnipeg, from 1969 to 1974, both in the Diocese of Rupert's Land. From 1974 to 1978 he served at Grace Church, Milton, Ontario, in the Diocese of Niagara.

Wallace was known for his impish sense of humour. In 1977, when his friend Michael Peers was elected Bishop of Qu'Appelle—having become Rector and Dean in Regina and the Wallaces having attended a celebrating party—Wallace sent him a note quoting the biblical text: "Oh lord remember me when you come into your kingdom." A year later, in 1978, he was appointed the Rector of St. Paul's Cathedral (Regina) and Dean of Qu'Appelle, Saskatchewan, a position he held for nineteen years until his election to the episcopacy.

== Bishop of Qu'Appelle ==
In 1997 he was elected tenth Bishop of Qu'Appelle.

=== Residential Schools Settlement ===
The defining feature of Wallace's tenure as bishop was the residential schools litigation, which put at risk the continued existence of the Diocese of Qu'Appelle.

During the 19th and early 20th centuries, the federal government had a policy of encouraging residential schools for children of Canadian First Nations, which were administered primarily by the Roman Catholic, Anglican and United Churches. While the purpose of the schools was to assist children of First Nations to integrate in Canada, in actuality, there was a large amount of child abuse, including sexual abuse. In the 1990s, survivors of the residential schools began lawsuits against the federal government and the churches, including the Diocese of Qu'Appelle, which had been responsible for operating some residential schools.

The magnitude of the claims by the former students came near to bankrupting the Diocese of Qu'Appelle, as occurred to the former Anglican Diocese of Cariboo in the Ecclesiastical Province of British Columbia and Yukon, which ceased operations on December 31, 2001 after being forced into bankruptcy. Under Wallace's leadership, the Diocese of Qu'Appelle was able to reach a settlement, as part of a national settlement made by the Anglican Church of Canada as a whole. The Primate of the Anglican Church, Michael Peers, made a formal apology to the survivors of the residential schools, on behalf of the Anglican Church of Canada.

Two of Wallace's colleagues commented on the significant role he played in the settlement of the residential schools claims. Deacon Michael Jackson of St. Paul's Cathedral stated that "Duncan's inner courage and strength got us through it." Tom Morgan, Archbishop of Saskatoon, noted that "Nowhere have his skills and his non-anxious presence been more tested and appreciated than in matters concerning litigation arising from residential schools."

== Later life and death ==
He retired in 2005. Although retired, he stayed active in church matters. As recently as the spring of 2015, he filled in as incumbent priest for a Regina parish which was searching for a new priest.

After a brief battle with cancer, Bishop Duncan Douglas Wallace died in Regina on June 22, 2015.

== Notes ==
Anglican Communion titles
Preceded by Eric Bays	Bishop of Qu’Appelle; 1998–2005	Succeeded by Gregory Kerr-Wilson
