= James Allan (bishop) =

Canadian Anglican bishop (1928–2013)

Hugh James Pearson Allan
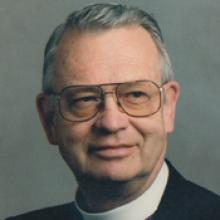
- Born: Hugh James Pearson Allan; August 7, 1928; Winnipeg, Manitoba, Canada
- Died: June 26, 2013 (aged 84); Winnipeg, Manitoba, Canada
- Occupation: Anglican Bishop of the Diocese of Keewatin
- Years active: 1955–1994
- Spouse: Beverley Edith Allan (née Baker) (m. 1955; died 2008)
- Children: 4

Hugh James Pearson Allan (7 August 1928 – 26 June 2013) was a Canadian Anglican bishop.

Allan was educated at the University of Manitoba. He was ordained in 1955 and began his ordained ministry with curacies in Winnipeg, after which he spent four years as a missionary at Peguis First Nation. From 1960 to 1968 he was Rector of St Mark's Winnipeg and then Rural Dean of Cypress. He was Dean of Qu'Appelle and Rector of St Paul's Cathedral, Regina until his ordination to the episcopate as the 6th Bishop of Keewatin in 1974. He resigned his see in 1991 and was an assistant bishop in the Diocese of Nova Scotia and Prince Edward Island until 1994. He died on June 26, 2013.

Anglican Communion titles
Preceded by Hugh Vernon Stiff	Bishop of Keewatin; 1974–1991	Succeeded by Thomas Collings
