= Gordon Beardy =

Anglican bishop

Gordon Beardy is a retired Anglican bishop.

Beardy was a suffragan bishop of Diocese of Keewatin from 1993 to 1996 and then its diocesan bishop from his election in 1996 until 2001.

Anglican Communion titles
Preceded by Thomas Collings	Bishop of Keewatin; 1996–2001	Succeeded by David Ashdown
