= Malcolm Harding (archbishop of Rupert's Land) =

Canadian Anglican bishop (1863/64–1949)

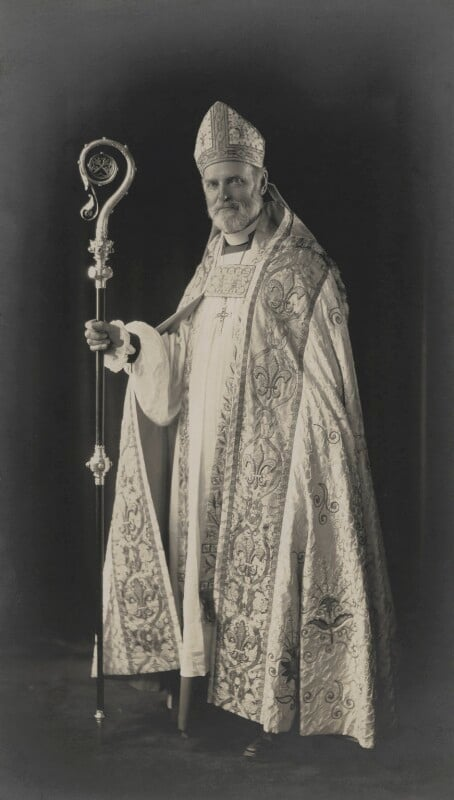
Harding, c. 1915

Malcolm Taylor McAdam Harding (1863 – 1949) was a bishop of the Anglican Church of Canada in the 20th century.

Ordained in 1889, his first posts were curacies at Holy Trinity Merrickville, Ontario and St. George's Cathedral, Kingston, Ontario. After this he was Rector of St. Matthew's Cathedral, Brandon, Manitoba then Archdeacon of Assiniboia. In 1909 he became Coadjutor Bishop of Qu’Appelle, and two years later its Diocesan. Elected Metropolitan of Rupert's Land and translated to the Diocese of Rupert's Land in 1935 he was then styled Archbishop of Rupert's Land. He retired in 1942. He died on 22 April 1949.

Anglican Communion titles
Preceded by John Grisdale	Bishop of Qu’Appelle; 1911–1935	Succeeded by Edwin Knowles
Preceded by Isaac Stringer	Bishop and Metropolitan of Rupert’s Land; 1935–1942	Succeeded by Louis Sherman
