= Eric Bays =

Anglican bishop

Orders
- Consecration: 08 November 1986 by Walter H. Jones

Eric Bays is a retired Anglican bishop.

Born on 10 August 1932 and educated at the University of Manitoba and the University of Saskatchewan, he was ordained in 1959. After a curacy at All Saints’, Winnipeg he was Priest in charge at Burns Lake, and then Masset, British Columbia. Later he was Vicar of St Saviour’s, Winnipeg and then Rector of All Saints', Winnipeg and Canon of St. John's Cathedral in the same city. From 1976 he was a professor at the College of Emmanuel and St Chad, and later Vice-Principal. In 1986 he was elected Bishop of Qu'Appelle, a post he held for 11 years.

== Notes ==
Anglican Communion titles
Preceded by Michael Geoffrey Peers	Bishop of Qu’Appelle; 1986–1997	Succeeded by Duncan Douglas Wallace
