= Hugh Stiff =

Canadian bishop (1916–1995)

The Right Reverend Hugh Vernon Stiff
- Born: 15 September 1916
- Died: 24 September 1995 (aged 79)
- Education: University of Toronto
- Occupation: Clergyman

Hugh Vernon Stiff (1916–1995) was a Canadian Anglican bishop in the 20th century.

== Life and career ==
Stiff was born on 15 September 1916 and educated at the University of Toronto. He was a parishioner of the Church of St. Mary Magdalene in Toronto. He was ordained in 1953 and began his ordained ministry as missioner at Lintlaw, Saskatchewan. After this, he was Rector of All Saints' Saskatchewan, then Dean of Calgary.

In 1969, he became Bishop of Keewatin. In 1974, he became Dean of Toronto and Rector of St. James Cathedral, until his retirement in 1986. Stiff died on 24 September 1995.

Anglican Communion titles
Preceded by Harry Ernest Hives	Bishop of Keewatin; 1969–1974	Succeeded by James Allan
