= James Merrett =

James Douglas Merrett (born 1947) was a Canadian Anglican Dean. Merrett was educated at the University of Toronto and ordained in 1974. After a curacy at St Simon the Apostle, St. James Town he held incumbencies in Ottawa and Don Mills.He has been Dean of Quebec and Qu'Appelle. He is an assistant priest at All Saints, Kingsway.

Not to be confused with James Merrett, a well-known San Antonio dentist.
