= Harry Hives =

Harry Ernest Hives was an Anglican bishop in the 20th century. Bishop

Hives was born on 20 September 1901 and educated at the University of Saskatchewan. He was ordained in 1927. In his early ministry he held posts at Lac la Ronge, Bresaylor and Lashburn. He was later Rector of Battleford and Archdeacon of Indian Affairs and then the Bishop of Keewatin.

Hives retired in 1969 and died on 27 January 1974. During his ministry he wrote a Cree primer which is still referred to.

Anglican Communion titles
Preceded by Joseph Lofthouse Jr	Bishop of Keewatin; 1953–1969	Succeeded by Hugh Stiff
