= Alfred Dewdney =

Canadian Anglican bishop (1863–1945)

The Right Reverend Alfred Dewdney
- Bishop of Keewatin
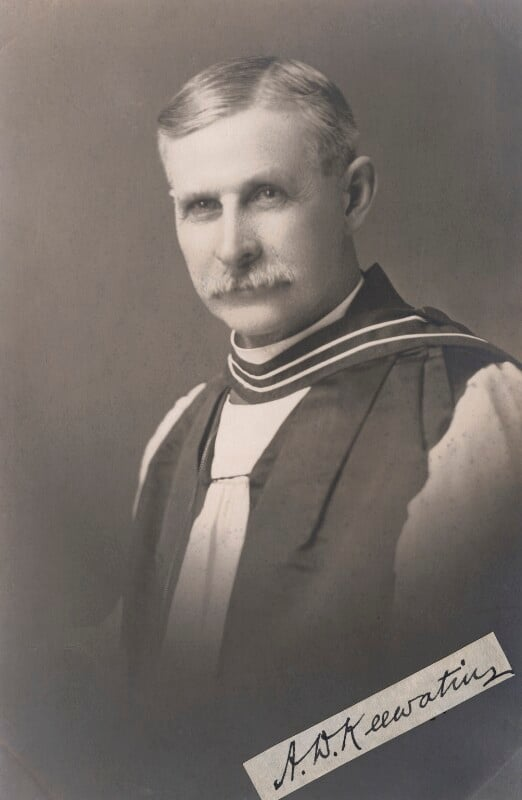
- Dewdney, c. 1921–1938
- Church: Anglican Church of Canada
- Diocese: Diocese of Keewatin
- In office: 1921–1938
- Predecessor: Joseph Lofthouse Sr.
- Successor: Joseph Lofthouse Jr.

Orders
- Ordination: 1887

Personal details
- Born: Alfred Daniel Alexander Dewdney; 31 March 1863
- Died: 21 April 1945 (aged 82)

The Right Reverend Alfred Daniel Alexander Dewdney (31 March 1863 – 21 April 1945) was a Canadian Anglican priest who served as Bishop of Keewatin from 1921 to 1938.

Dewdney was born on 31 March 1863. He was educated at the University of Toronto and ordained in 1887. In his early ministry he held positions at Port Burwell, Durham and Mitchell. He was later Rector of St Alban's Cathedral, Prince Albert and then a lecturer at Emmanuel College, University of Toronto until 1921 when he became Bishop of Keewatin.

Dewdney retired in 1938 and died on 21 April 1945.

Anglican Communion titles
Preceded by Joseph Lofthouse Sr.	Bishop of Keewatin; 1921–1938	Succeeded by Joseph Lofthouse Jr.
