= Michael Coleman (bishop) =

The Rt Rev Michael Edward Coleman, was an Anglican bishop in the second quarter of the 20th century.

Born in April 1902 and educated at Bradfield College, he was ordained in 1928. After a curacy at Hucknall Torkard he was a Toc H Chaplain in Manchester and western Canada before joining the staff of All Hallows-by-the-Tower. In 1943 he became a Canon at Christ Church Cathedral, Victoria. Seven years later he was appointed Bishop of Qu'Appelle, a post he held for a decade.

He died on 2 February 1969.

== Notes ==
Anglican Communion titles
| Preceded by Edwin Hubert Knowles | Bishop of Qu’Appelle; 1950–1960 | Succeeded by George Clarence Fredric Jackson |
