= St. Alban's Cathedral (Kenora) =

- The Cathedral Church of St. Alban the Martyr
- St. Alban's Cathedral
- 49°45′55″N 94°29′32″W
- Location: Kenora, Ontario
- Country: Canada
- Denomination: Anglican

Architecture
- Architect: Arthur J. Wills
- Years built: 1917

St. Alban's Cathedral is an Anglican church in Kenora, Ontario.

It was the cathedral of the Diocese of Keewatin prior to its dissolution in 2015.
