= Loftus (given name) =

Loftus is a masculine given name. Notable people with the name include:

- Loftus Armstrong (1878–1959), New Zealand rugby union player
- Loftus Becker, American law professor
- Loftus Henry Bland (1805–1872), Irish barrister and Member of Parliament
- Loftus Jones (1879–1916), British Royal Navy commander awarded the Victoria Cross
- Loftus William Otway (1775–1854), British Army general
- Loftus Perkins (1834–1891), English engineer
- Loftus Dudley Ward (1905–1980), Canadian politician and Royal Canadian Navy chief petty officer
- Loftus Wigram (1803–1889), British barrister, businessman and Member of Parliament
