= Diocese of Qu'Appelle =

Diocese of the Anglican Church of Canada

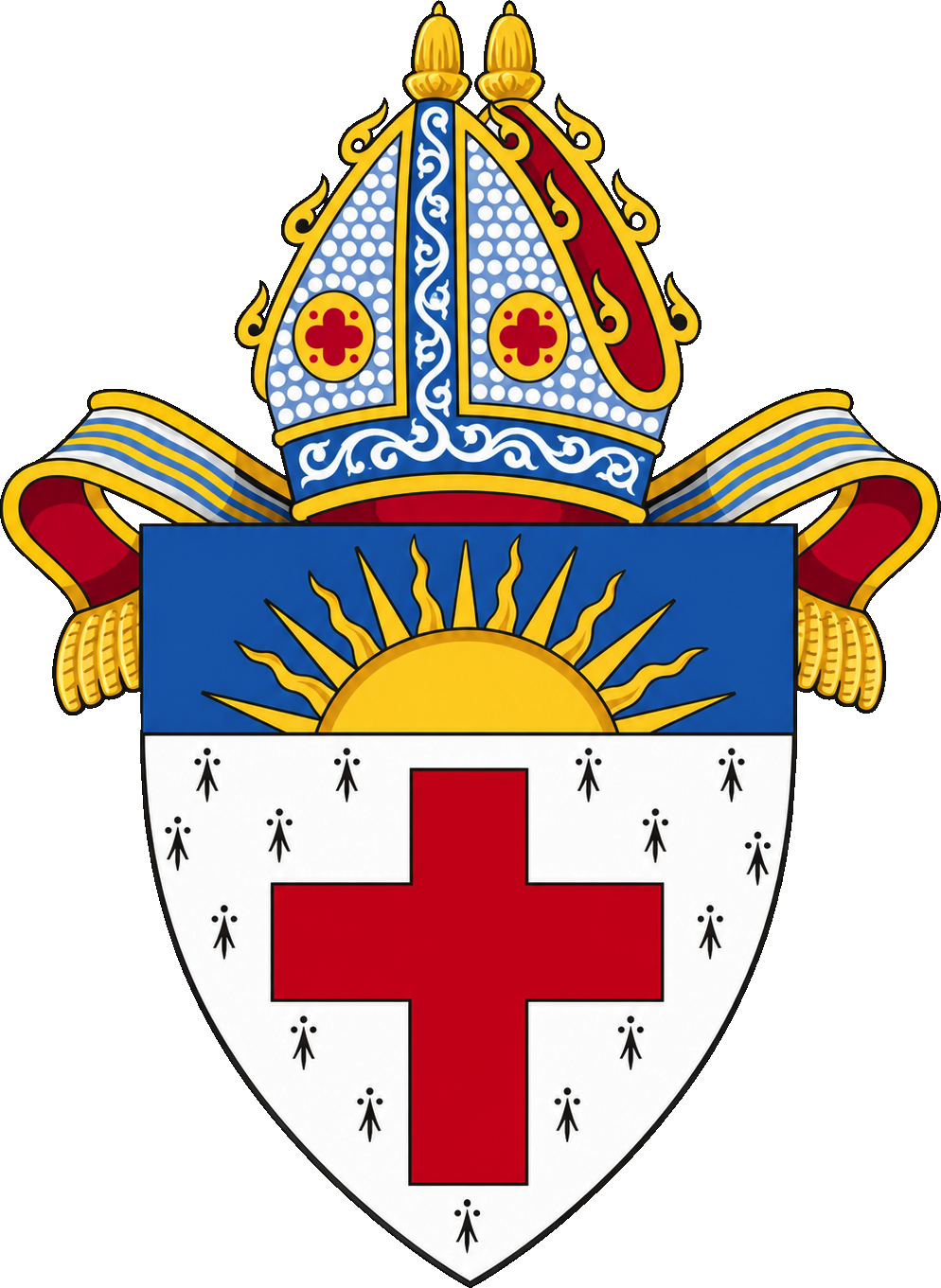

Location
- Ecclesiastical province: Northern Lights

Statistics
- Parishes: 26 (2022)
- Members: 2,727 (2022)

Information
- Rite: Anglican
- Cathedral: St. Paul's Cathedral, Regina, Saskatchewan

Current leadership
- Bishop: Helen Kennedy

Map
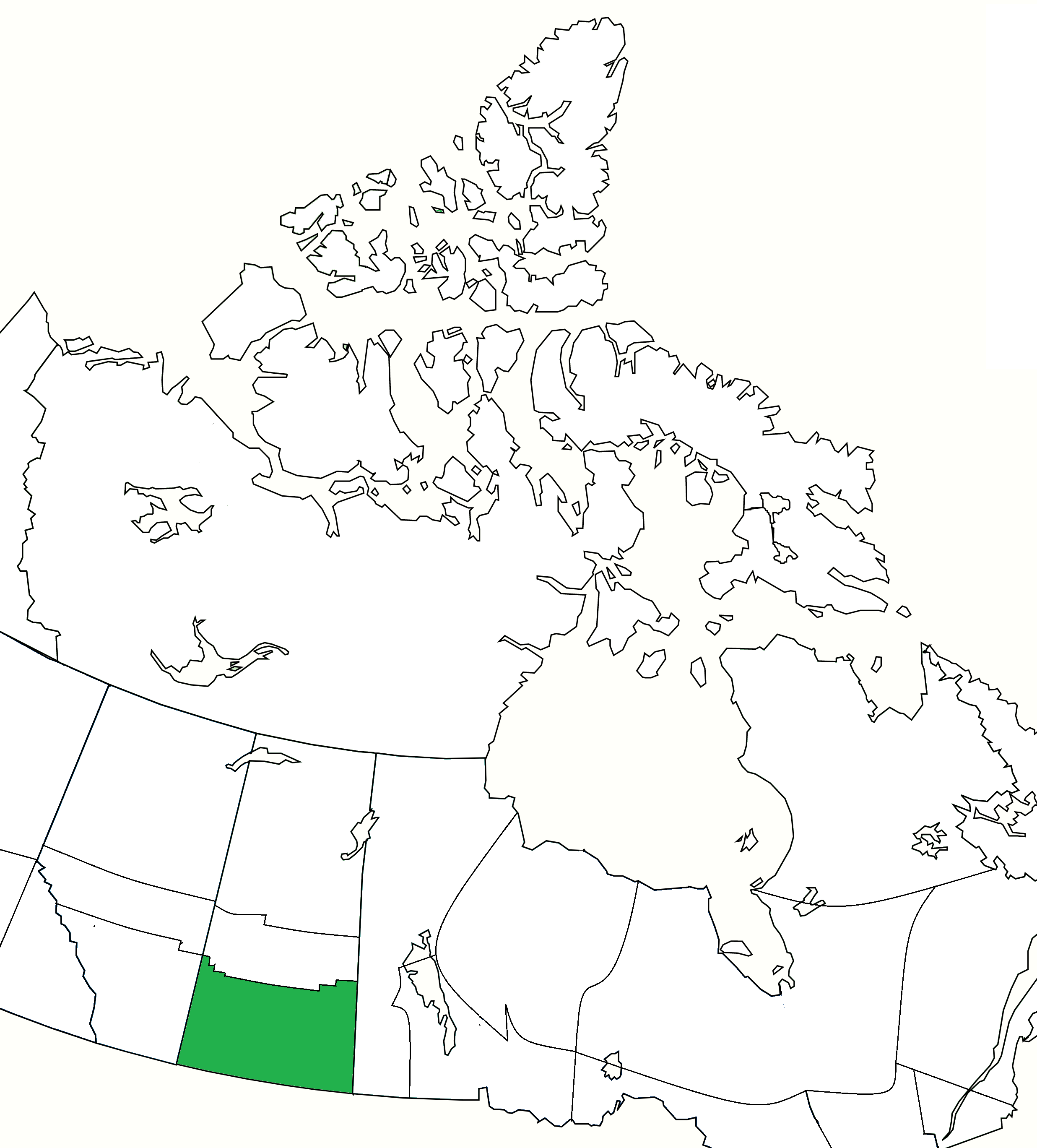
- Boundaries of the diocese within the Province of the Northern Lights

Website
- quappelle.anglican.ca

The Diocese of Qu'Appelle in the Anglican Church of Canada lies in the southern third of the civil province of Saskatchewan and contains within its geographical boundaries some 50 per cent of the province's population of one million.

== History ==
=== Establishment ===
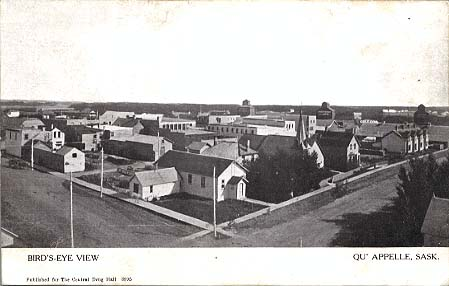
St Peter's Pro-Cathedral, Qu'Appelle with the Terrace, circa 1905

The diocese was established by the Synod of the Ecclesiastical Province of Rupert's Land in 1884 at the beginning of European settlement on the Canadian prairies beyond the vicinity of Winnipeg; it geographically corresponds to the former District of Assiniboia in the then North-West Territories [sic]: indeed, until the 1970s it precisely so-corresponded, and included a strip of territory lying over the Alberta provincial boundary once the provinces of Saskatchewan and Alberta were created in 1905. This was ceded to the Diocese of Calgary.

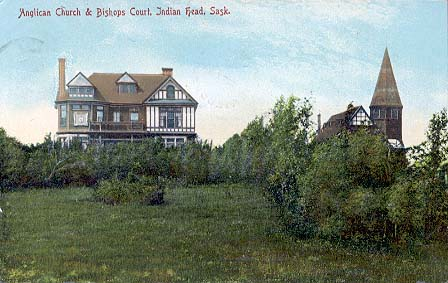
Bishops Court and Anglican church, Indian Head, after 1905

At the beginning of settlement it was unclear where the District headquarters and territorial capital would be; the diocese selected the then-burgeoning village of Troy (now Qu'Appelle), some 48 kilometres (30 mi) east of present-day Regina as the cathedral city, and the first pro-cathedral was St Peter's in that village. The original Bishop's Court was there but subsequently relocated to nearby Indian Head: it is in a verdant rolling parkland immediately adjacent to the Qu'Appelle Valley, amply treed with aspen and birch groves, with spring-fed creeks in lush coulees and plentiful local supplies of water.

=== Early difficulty in coping with the majority of prairie settlers ===
Relations between the English immigrants of the Anglican pro-cathedral parish in Qu'Appelle and the native-Canadian Presbyterian, Methodist and Roman Catholic settlers from Ontario and Quebec as well as numerous settlers from the USA across the border to the south were at times frosty and the Anglican Church was long referred to in some disparagement as "the English Church" by eastern Canadian settlers who perhaps regarded themselves as more authentically Canadian. Growth of the diocese was hindered in early years by a number of factors:

[E]astern Canadian dioceses did not respond in a liberal manner to the numerous appeals for financial support and volunteers. As a result, the western Canadian dioceses relied on money and manpower from the Church of England and its missionary societies. Heavy dependency on overseas help in turn created problems for the Church on the frontier: inadequate funding by far-removed committees, party divisions, the "Englishness" of the Church, a laity not used to voluntary giving, and the failure of the clergy to adjust to frontier conditions all hurt the Anglican cause.

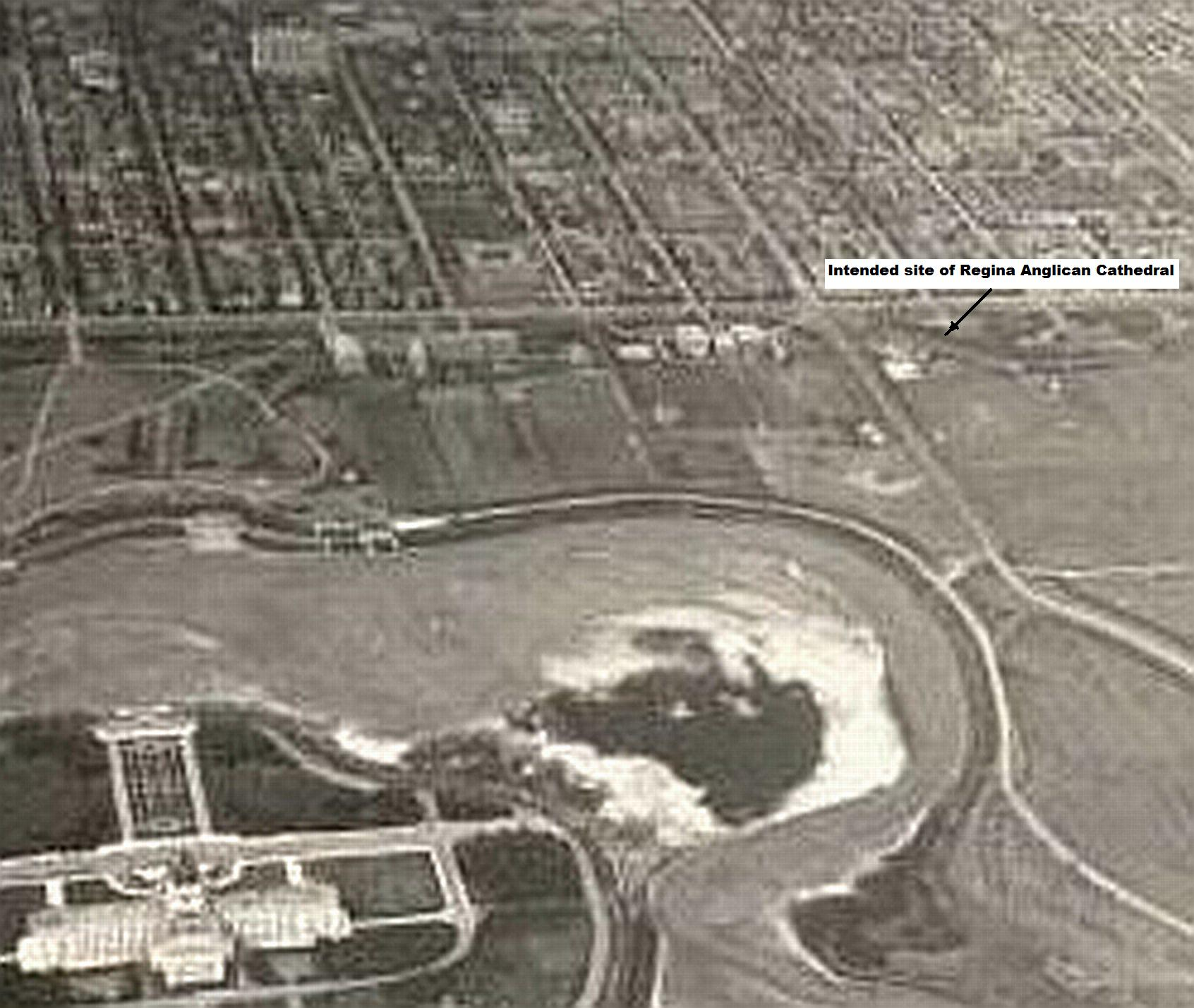
The originally intended site of Regina's Anglican cathedral at the corner of Broad Street and College Avenue during the draining and deepening of Wascana Lake during the 1930s.

Owing to some fairly astonishing corruption by latter day standards, another site was chosen instead. The Lieutenant-Governor of the North-West(sic)Territories, Edgar Dewdney, had acquired substantial landholdings adjacent to the future route of the Canadian Pacific Railway at Oscana—the Cree word meaning "pile of bones" in reference to the plains bison bones scattered around Wascana Creek before the area was populated by non-indigenous people. Dewdney designated it to be the site of the Territorial headquarters: what became the town of Regina, on a particularly disobliging tract of land, featureless, treeless and waterless. However, the minority English settlers at Qu'Appelle had in any case somewhat alienated the native Canadians among whom they had settled and it was perhaps sensible for the Anglican Church to make a new start in Regina. When it became apparent that neither Qu’Appelle nor nearby Indian Head were going to be an important urban centre the diocese acquired a substantial property in Regina on College Avenue east of Broad Street.

=== Adjustment to emerging reality ===
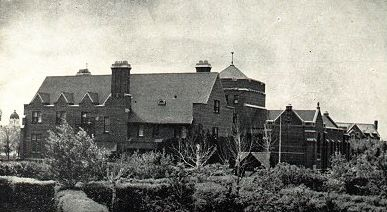
St Chad's College building, originally the theological seminary for the Diocese of Qu'Appelle, later the premises for the Qu'Appelle Diocesan School, renamed St Chad's School in 1962 and closed in 1970

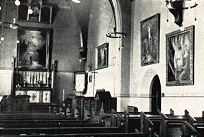
St Chad's chapel interior. When St Chad's School closed in 1970 the bishop, whose residence was at the adjacent Bishop's Court, and the diocesan staff continued to use the chapel privately.

Meanwhile, the St Paul's, Regina was designated the pro-cathedral in 1944. By 1973 it was clear that the diocese would never be self-supporting — it had been a mission field of the English diocese of Lichfield but this had long since become unrealistic — other than by alienating its only substantial real estate, whose acquisition had been substantially underwritten by the original missioning diocese.

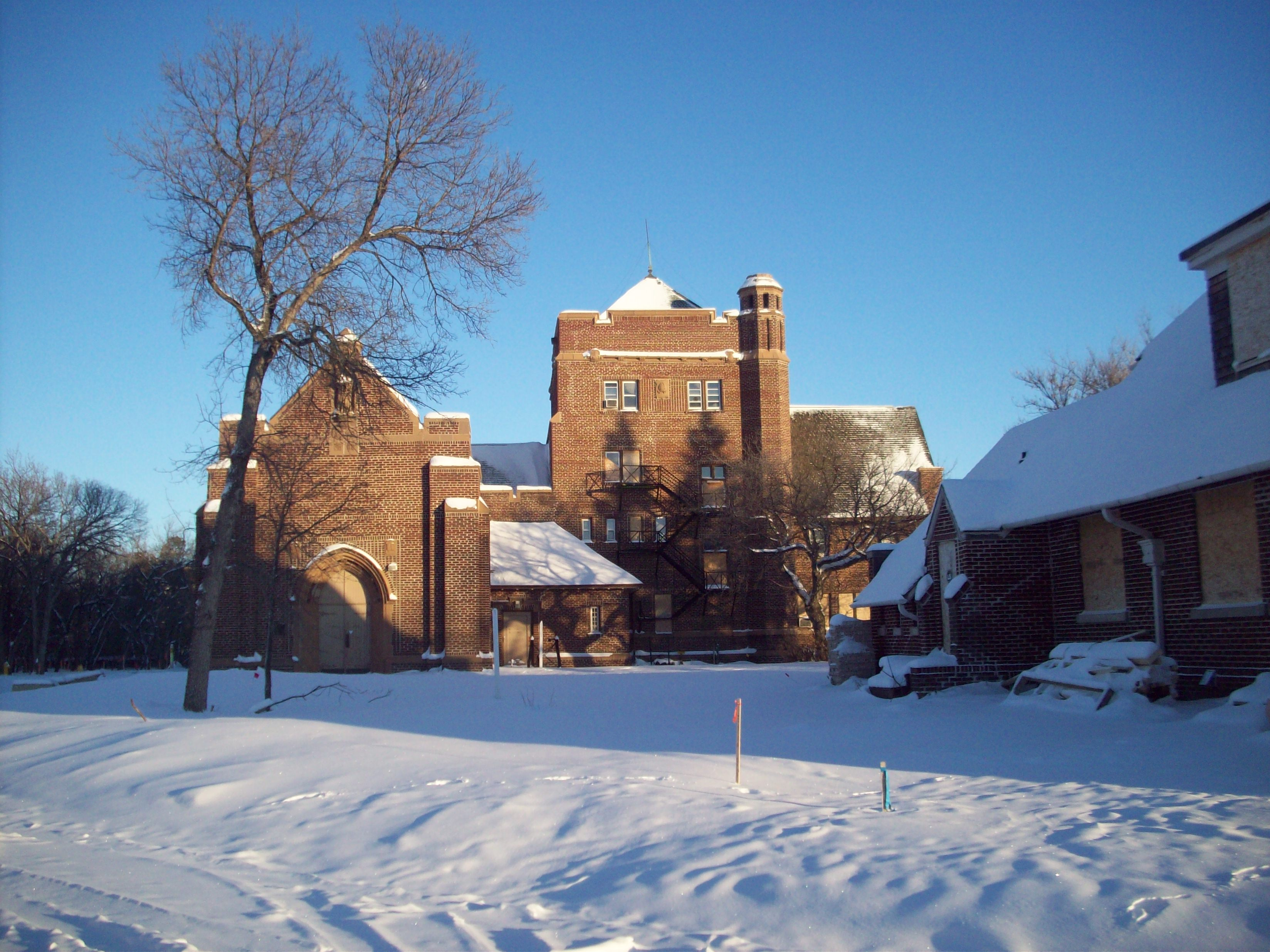
The former St Chad's College and Qu'Appelle Diocesan Synod Office, Regina, January 2010.

Today approximately one-half of the civil Province of Saskatchewan's one million residents live within the diocesan boundaries of Qu'Appelle. However, only some 10,000 of these 500,000-odd people identify as Anglican. Immigration patterns at the outset of settlement determined that the majority of Southern Saskatchewan's people would be German Lutherans and Roman Catholics, Scottish Presbyterians and Roman Catholics, British and American Methodists (the former's ancestors from eastern Canada), Ukrainian Orthodox and Roman Catholics, to name only some of the denominations and ethnicities that constitute the vast non-Anglican majority.

=== Closure of Anglican theological college and girls' school; sale of diocesan headquarters property ===
"In 1964, for reasons of efficiency St. Chad's Theological College amalgamated with Emmanuel College in Saskatoon. Six years later, St. Chad's Girls' School was closed and the diocesan site sold" to the provincial government in the 1980s. The diocesan offices, the former St Chad's Qu'Appelle Diocesan School, the former bishop's palace, an old people's home and other diocesan structures remained, for a time leased back from the provincial crown; the government has now itself sold the former diocesan property for residential and commercial development. (Of special interest on the property is the intended cathedral site laid out at the corner of Broad Street and College Avenue, outlined in caragana hedges.) St Paul's was upgraded to cathedral status in 1973 and a satisfactory 2-manual Casavant Frères pipe organ was built in it in 1974.

== Bishops of Qu'Appelle ==
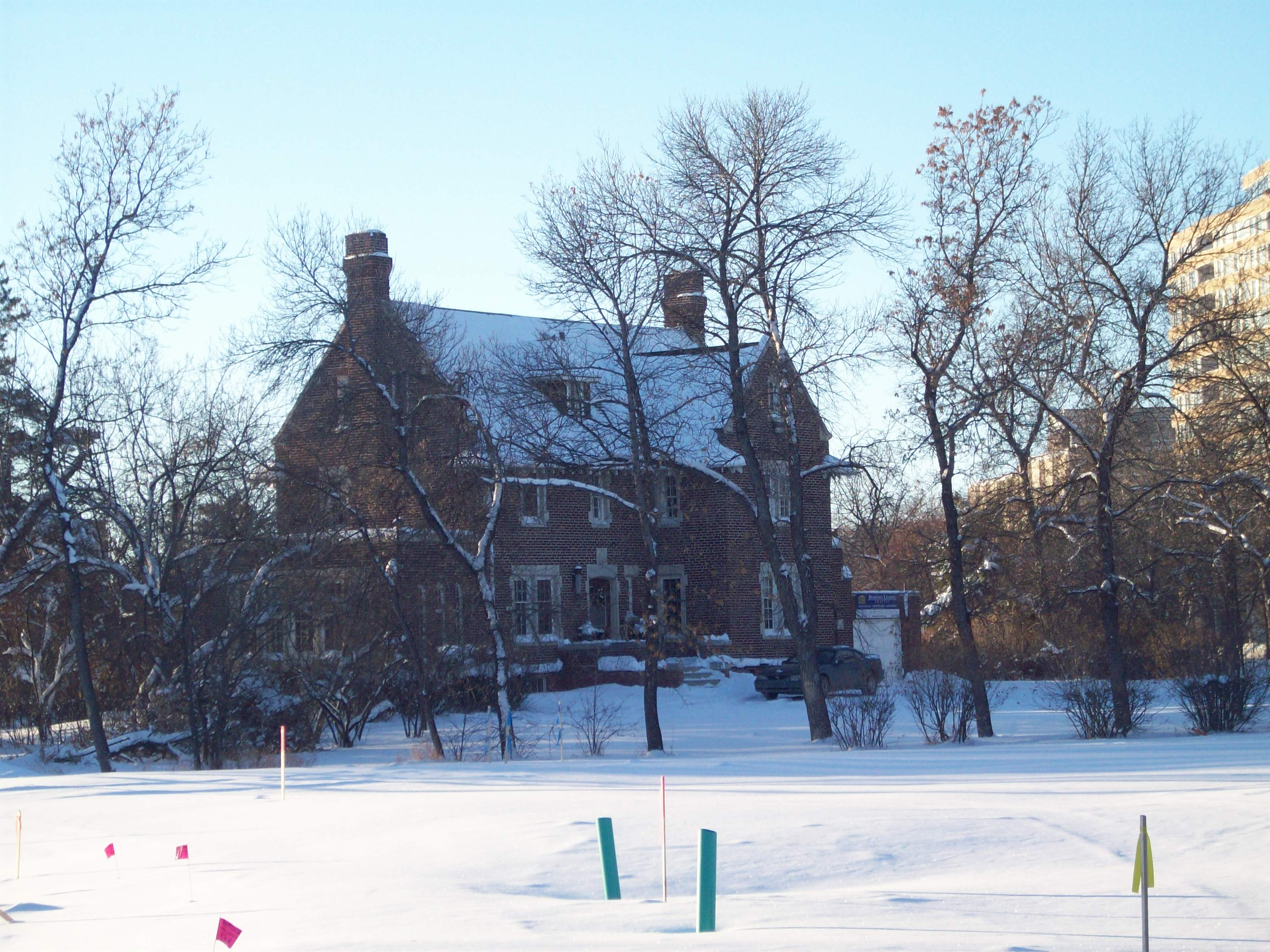
Bishop's Court, Regina, Saskatchewan

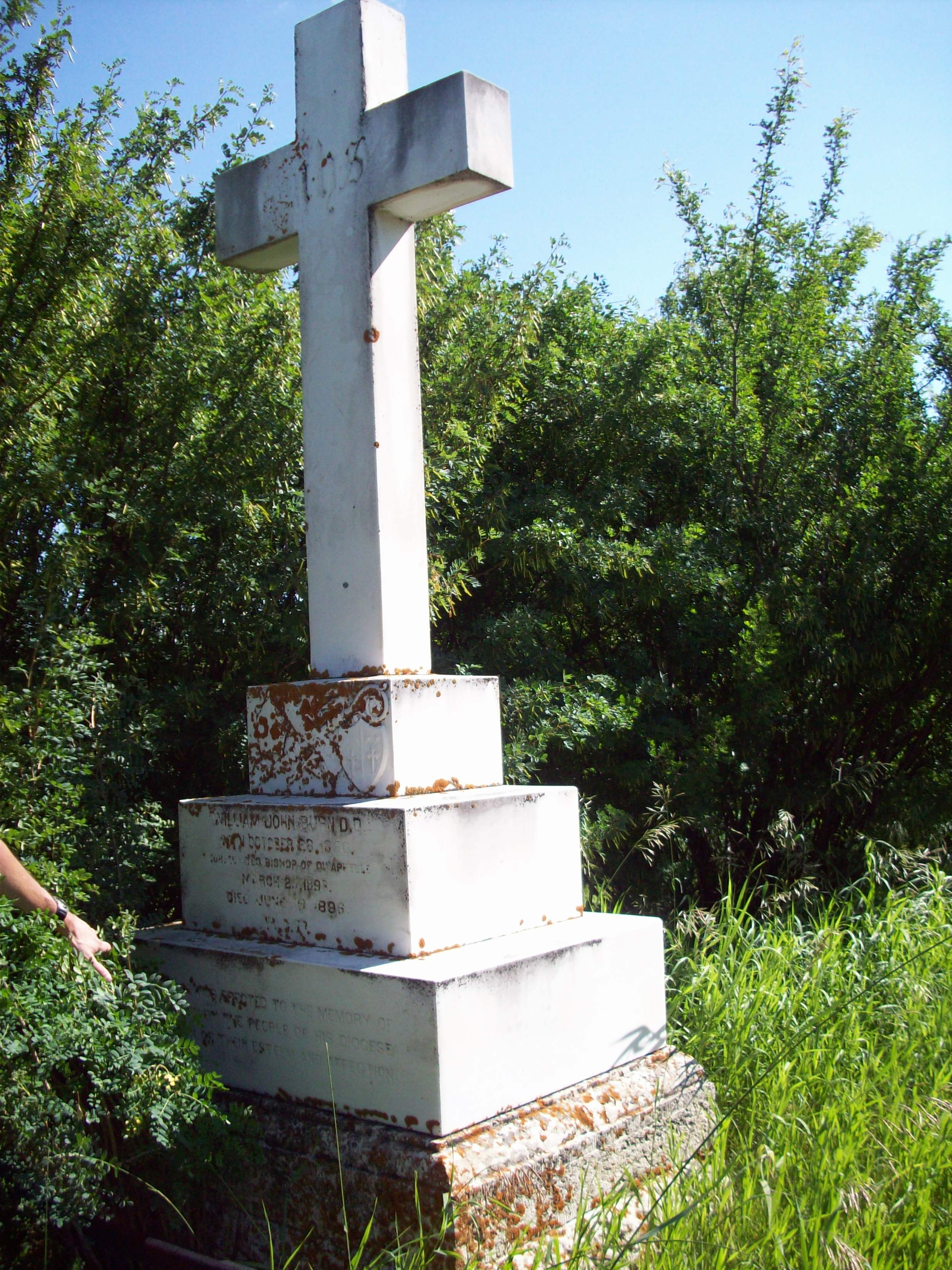
Bishop Burn's grave, Qu'Appelle, Saskatchewan

No.	Image	Name	Dates	Notes
1		Adelbert Anson	1884–1892	
2		John Burn	1893–1896	
3		John Grisdale	1896–1911	
4		Malcolm Harding	1911–1934	Translated to Rupert's Land, 1935. Metropolitan of Rupert’s Land, 1935–1942
5		Edwin Knowles	1935–1950	
6		Michael Coleman	1950–1960	
7		Fredric Jackson	1960–1976	Metropolitan of Rupert's Land, 1971–1976; Bishop ordinary to the Canadian Armed Forces, 1971–1976
8		Michael Peers	1976–1986	Metropolitan of Rupert's Land, 1981–1986; Primate of Canada, 1986–2004
9		Eric Bays	1986–1997	
10		Duncan Wallace	1997–2005	
11		Greg Kerr-Wilson	2006–2012	Translated to Calgary, 2012; Metropolitan of Rupert's Land, 2015–present
12		Robert Hardwick	2012–2021	
13		Helen Kennedy	2022–present	

== The Diocese today ==
=== Tradition and revision ===
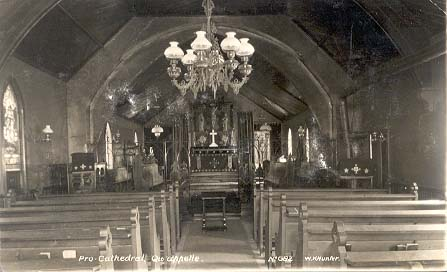
St Peter's Pro-Cathedral, Qu'Appelle, interior

The diocese has historically had a somewhat high church ethos (note photographs of interiors of the original pro-cathedral in the town of Qu'Appelle and St Chad's Chapel on the former diocesan property in Regina), with significant early input by religious orders including the Sisters of St John the Divine who operated the St Chad's Qu'Appelle Diocesan School until its closure. On the other hand, during the time of Michael Peers as Dean, Bruce McLeod, then Moderator of the United Church of Canada, visited Regina and departed from predecessors by visiting St Paul's Cathedral rather than any local United Church and was widely commented upon by parishioners as having delivered the best sermon they had ever heard.

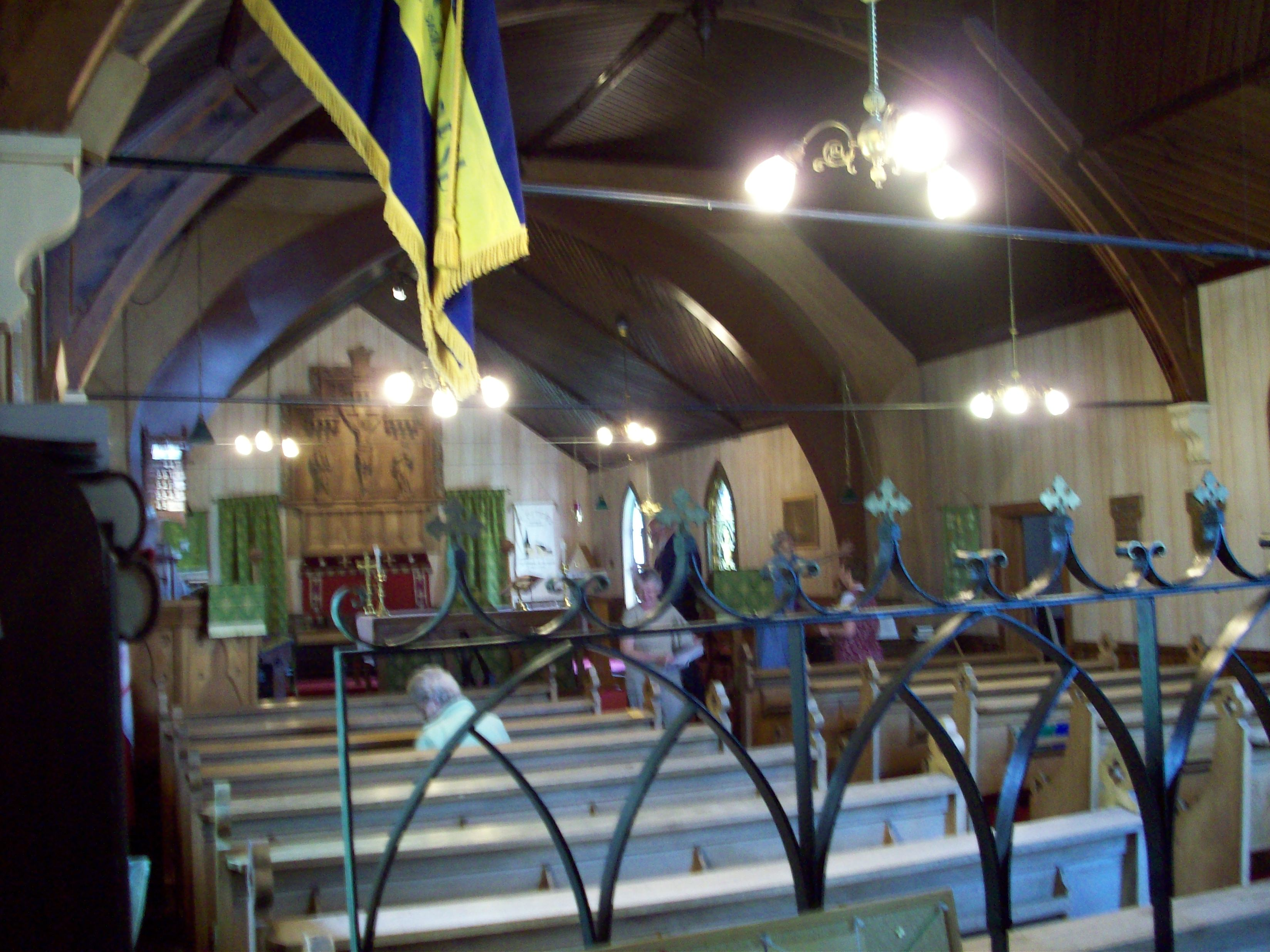
Interior of St Peter's, Qu'Appelle, in 2008, still unusually high-church for Canada though more mainstream than in the late 19th century.

The diocese was an early leader in liturgical revision, first publishing The Qu'Appelle Liturgy for local use in 1969, 16 years before 1985's Book of Alternative Services albeit considerably later than a corresponding move by Toronto's St. Mary Magdalene. "The Qu'Appelle Liturgy...[w]hile developed for one diocese,...was authorized for use in much of Canada....The influence of the Qu'Appelle Liturgy is notable today in A Melanesian English Prayer Book, where the words of administration of Holy Communion follow the Qu'Appelle model closely in including the phrase 'Do this and know that I am with you.'" Such characteristics remain.

=== Parishes ===
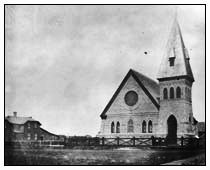
St Paul's, Regina, circa 1895, a half-century before replacing St. Peter's, Qu'Appelle as the pro-cathedral of the diocese.

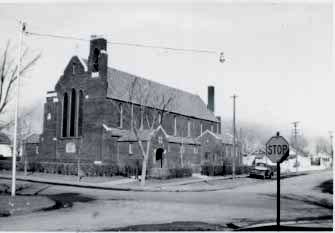
St. Matthew's Anglican Church, 2165 Winnipeg Street, Regina's East end. The church parish came into being when east-side denizens formed a Sunday school in 1907; construction was completed on the new church building in 1926.

The diocese consists of 44 parishes and 109 congregations with 50 full-time, part-time, non-stipendiary and retired clergy in the cities and towns as with Roman Catholic parishes though in accordance with historic settlement patterns never in villages or the countryside as historically with Presbyterian and Methodist churches.

Urban parishes average about 300 members; rural parishes, about 150 members with two to six congregations. A steady reduction in parishioners has led to churches closing: one particularly drastic instance is the four parishes of Moose Jaw becoming one in 2003 and occupying the building of St. John's Anglican Church as St. Aidan Anglican Church, of which "[t]he cornerstone was laid in 1909," and "located in downtown Moose Jaw, beside the bus depot at High St. and 1st Ave. East."

Churches in small towns seldom have their own clergy unshared with others; parishes tend to have multiple churches sharing clergy. Apart from the conspicuous situation of the four former parishes of Moose Jaw merging and retaining only one, as yet there has not been the drastic closing of multiple churches as by the United Church in Regina and elsewhere.

=== Women ===
Women have always played a significant role in ministry and leadership; when the Anglican Church of Canada finally began ordaining women to the priesthood in 1974 there were already many women deacons occupying the role of parish minister—particularly in aboriginal parishes—although unable to celebrate Holy Communion and perform various other functions reserved to priests, and these women were immediately ordained and became the priests of their parishes. Women have held the posts of archdeacon, regional dean and honorary Canon of the Cathedral, and in 2021 the diocese elected Helen Kennedy as its first woman bishop, making her the first woman to be elected bishop of an Anglican diocese in Saskatchewan.

=== "The English church" ===
In the past the Anglican Church on the prairies had a profile, for better or worse and with greater or lesser legitimacy, of being somewhat exclusive. This was never wholly accurate, though it certainly had ample documentation: At one point Bishop Harding, the Church of England Bishop, was quoted at a meeting — when he was imprudently unaware that local Canadians were hearing his remarks — as observing that English Anglican migrants might be more attractive settlers than Presbyterian and Methodist Canadians, occasioning considerable adverse notice and animosity against the English in the general community.

In any case, nowadays parishes in the diocese of Qu'Appelle engage in substantial co-operation with Evangelical Lutheran Church in Canada and United Church of Canada congregations to maintain a significant Christian presence in the community and there are numerous joint endeavours.

=== Aboriginal Anglicans ===
The diocese is approximately 15% aboriginal, a somewhat higher figure than in the population at large: the Anglican Church has always had a substantial role in ministry to aboriginal people though not always constructive and positive, certainly in schooling provided to boarders. During the 1998-2005 episcopacy of Duncan Wallace court action against the diocese on behalf of long previous students came near to ruining the diocese as occurred in the former Anglican Diocese of Cariboo in the Ecclesiastical Province of British Columbia and Yukon which was formed in 1914, ceased operations on December 31, 2001 after being forced into bankruptcy and was only able to continue as Anglican Parishes of the Central Interior. The Diocese of Qu'Appelle was very nearly forced into bankruptcy the same way by litigation on behalf of former students at aboriginal residential schools operated by the church who had credibly brought claims of abuse against them. The claims were ultimately settled nationally — Roman Catholic religious orders and dioceses were also defendants together with the federal crown, on whose behalf churches had managed such schools — and the Diocese of Qu'Appelle remains a distinctly inclusive institution.

=== Prominent Qu'Appelle Anglicans ===
- Fredric Jackson was Bishop Ordinary to the Armed Forces and a chaplain of the Royal Canadian Mounted Police national training centre in Regina.
- Michael Peers, a former dean, bishop and archbishop of Qu'Appelle, was Primate of the Anglican Church of Canada from 1986 to 2004.

== See also ==
- Anglican Church of Canada
- Qu'Appelle, Saskatchewan (original see city)
- Indian Head (second location of bishop's court)
