= Joseph Lofthouse =

Canadian Anglican bishop

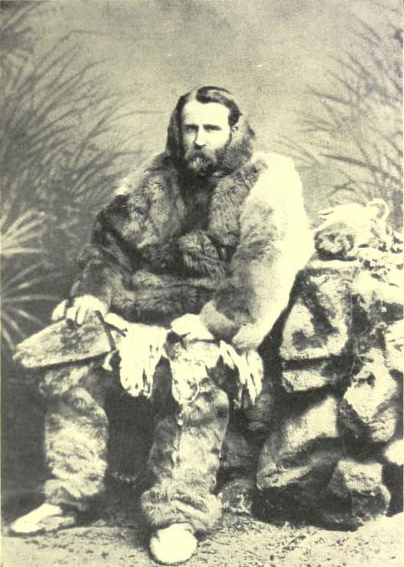
- Born: 18 December 1855
- Died: 16 December 1933 (aged 77); Dawlish
- Style: The Right Reverend Dr.

Joseph Lofthouse, Sr., (18 December 1855 – 16 December 1933) was a Canadian Anglican bishop in the early 20th century.

He was born in Yorkshire, went to Canada in 1882, was ordained in 1883 and began his ministry as a missionary at York Factory. He was later Archdeacon of Moosonee before being appointed as the first Bishop of Keewatin in 1902 and receiving a doctor of divinity degree from St. John's College in Winnipeg.

The Hudson's Bay Company had neglected the spiritual welfare of its employees and the Indigenous people with whom they traded, so Lofthouse was sent out to found a church in Churchill, Manitoba. He and his guide Andrew Flett had to walk for eight days up the coast from York Factory through roadless country to meet Lofthouse's fiancée in Churchill. However, when the ship arrived a month late, Lofthouse found that Betsy Fallding had missed the boat. Since the ship had no proper accommodations for a lady, she had been refused passage. There being no more sailings that year, Lofthouse had to wait until the next year after the ice broke up.

He made another nine-day walk up the coast in 1885. The ship arrived at the end of August but Lofthouse was the only preacher around. Since he could not conduct his own marriage ceremony, Fallding would have to go back to England. The captain of a Canadian government ship, which happened to be in port, pointed out that he was a magistrate, and, as such, had the power to conduct the ceremony. Lofthouse and Fallding, who had been friends in England, were married on 4 September 1885. Journalist Charles Richard Tuttle published a humorous account of the couple's courtship, claiming the pair had never seen each other before Fallding got off the ship in Churchill, but George Simpson McTavish set the record straight in his autobiography.

Lofthouse erected, mostly with his own hands, an iron-framed Anglican church still in use in Churchill that was the first prefabricated building in North America. He made a number of difficult trips into the interior to preach to the Inuit, Denesuline and Cree. In 1900, Lofthouse joined Ontario land surveyor James Williams Tyrrell and others, who traveled by canoe from Artillery Lake to Clinton-Colden Lake, then to Smart and Sifton Lakes, and canoed down the Hanbury River to the Thelon River and eventually to Baker Lake and Chesterfield Inlet.

Lofthouse ended his career as Bishop of Keewatin based in Kenora, Ontario, where he dedicated the stained glass window behind the altar in St. Alban's Cathedral to his wife Betsy, who died the year the cathedral was built. After the couple's only daughter, Marjorie Gordon Briggs, died in Saskatoon during the Spanish flu epidemic, Lofthouse retired in 1920 and returned to England. He died at Dawlish on 16 December 1933. His son Joseph Lofthouse Jr. served as third Bishop of Keewatin from 1938 to 1953.

== See also ==
Joseph Lofthouse Jr.

== Sources ==
- Ferguson, Robert Munro, "A Visit to Fort Churchill, Hudson's Bay," Montreal Diocesan Theological College Magazine, 1895.
- Hodgins, Bruce W.; Hoyle, Gwyneth (1997). Canoeing North Into the Unknown: A Record of River Travel 1874 to 1974. Toronto: Natural Heritage. ISBN 0-920474-93-4.
- MacIver, Angus & Bernice, Churchill on Hudson Bay, second edition, 2006, ISBN 0-9780757-3-0
- McTavish, George Simpson (1963). Behind the Palisades: An Autobiography.
- Lofthouse, Joseph, A thousand Miles From A Post Office: Or Twenty years Life And Travel in the Hudson's Bay Regions (1922), Kessinger Publishing, no date, no ISBN. (reprint of 1922 Macmillan of Canada edition).
- Tuttle, Charles Richard (1885). Our North Land. Toronto: Robinson

Anglican Communion titles
New diocese	Bishop of Keewatin; 1902–1921	Succeeded by Alfred Daniel Alexander Dewdney
