= Joseph Lofthouse Jr. =

The Right Reverend Joseph Lofthouse Jr.
- Born: 17 March 1880
- Died: 13 July 1962 (aged 82)

Joseph Lofthouse Jr. (17 March 1880 – 13 July 1962) was an Anglican bishop in the 20th century.

Lofthouse was born on 17 March 1880. He was educated at the University of Toronto and ordained in 1907. He was Incumbent of St James' Rainy River then a canon of St Alban's Pro-Cathedral, Keewatin, then a domestic and examining chaplain to the Bishop of Keewatin and Archdeacon of Kenora before succeeding him in 1938.

Lofthouse retired in 1953 and died on 13 July 1962.

== See also ==
Joseph Lofthouse

Anglican Communion titles
Preceded by Alfred Dewdney	Bishop of Keewatin; 1938–1953	Succeeded by Harry Hives
