= Diocese of Keewatin =

Former diocese of the Anglican Church in Canada

Coordinates: 49.8°N 94.5°W

Location
- Ecclesiastical province: Rupert's Land

Information
- Rite: Anglican
- Dissolved: 2015
- Cathedral: St. Alban's Cathedral, Kenora (former)

The Diocese of Keewatin was a diocese of the Anglican Church of Canada. As of 1 August 2014, it no longer had any territorial jurisdiction, but it continued to exist as a legal entity until 30 September 2015, when it was formally closed.

Formerly, the diocese straddled the border of the civil provinces of Manitoba and Ontario, comprising over 900,000 square kilometres. The diocese was geographically isolated, consisting of mainly small, and mostly First Nations, communities. The largest of these, Kenora, Ontario, was also the diocese's See city. There were just over 11,000 Anglicans on forty-eight parish rolls. The diocese was established by the Ecclesiastical Province of Rupert's Land in 1902, and it was a major focus for missionary activity among the indigenous peoples there.

The last bishop (the diocese's ninth) was Archbishop David Ashdown. Elected Bishop of Keewatin in 2001, he was subsequently elected Metropolitan of the Ecclesiastical Province of Rupert's Land in June 2009. The dean was the Very Rev. Hugh Matheson.

== Closure of diocese ==
As set out in a June 2013 resolution of the Anglican Church's General Synod, the diocese of Keewatin ceased to operate on 31 December 2014. It was formally closed on 30 September 2015, at which time Archbishop Ashdown retired as both diocesan bishop and as Metropolitan of Rupert's Land. The First Nations parishes in northwestern Ontario and northern Manitoba were separated from Keewatin on 1 June 2014 to form the new diocese of Mishamikoweesh. The Rt. Rev. Lydia Mamakwa, the area bishop for Northern Ontario within the former Keewatin diocese, is now diocesan bishop of Mishamikoweesh.

The southern parishes in the diocese were transferred to the Diocese of Rupert's Land on 1 August 2014. There were also minor adjustments to the boundaries of the Diocese of Brandon.

== Bishops of Keewatin ==
No.	Name	Dates	Notes
1	Joseph Lofthouse	1902–1921	
2	Alfred Dewdney	1921–1938	
3	Joseph Lofthouse, Jr.	1938–1953	
4	Harry Hives	1953–1969	
5	Hugh Stiff	1969–1974	afterwards Dean of Toronto, 1974–1996
6	James Allan	1974–1991	
7	Thomas Collings	1991–1996	
8	Gordon Beardy	1996–2001	
9	David Ashdown	2001–2015	Last Bishop of Keewatin; Metropolitan of Rupert's Land, 2009-2015
