= St. Elizabeth's Indian School =

American Indian boarding school

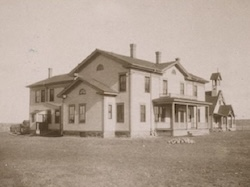
- St. Elizabeth's Mission School (c. 1900)

Location
- Wakpala, South Dakota; Standing Rock Reservation; 45.6375°N 100.5195°W

Information
- Type: American Indian residential school
- Religious affiliation: Episcopal Church
- Established: 1886
- Closed: 1967
- Gender: Coed
- Language: English

St. Elizabeth's Boarding School for Indian Children, also known as St. Elizabeth's Mission School, was an American Indian residential school located in the Wakpala area of the Standing Rock Reservation in South Dakota. It was established in 1886 and remained in operation until 1967. The school was co-educational and affiliated with the Episcopal Church. Students ranged in age from six to 17 years of age, and there were typically 45-60 students boarding at any one time. This school was one of many operated as part of a national effort to assimilate Native Americans into the dominant Anglo-American culture.

== History ==
=== Foundation and construction ===
The school originated as a small day school in the St. Elizabeth's chapel. Under the guidance of Bishop William Hobart Hare, construction of the boarding school began in 1885. It was the first Episcopal school on the Standing Rock Reservation. The project was supported by Lakota Chief Gall, who believed education was essential for Indian advancement. His daughters attended St. Elizabeth's, and Gall was baptized in the Episcopal faith. He was also buried in the parish cemetery.

The first priest for the congregation and the school was Reverend Philip Joseph Deloria, a member of the Yankton Sioux Tribe. His daughter Ella, who attended St. Elizabeth's and later became principal of it, described her father as "very strict", and that he had "tried to eliminate old Indian ways as fast as he could — ceremonies, dances, dress and languages." Philip Deloria was later assisted by Reverend Herbert Welsh (not to be confused with Herbert Welsh of the Indian Rights Association), a Sioux clergyman who had attended an Episcopal reservation school as a boy.

=== Fire and rebuilding effort ===
In the winter of 1897, the school caught fire. Mary Francis, then the principal of St. Elizabeth's, was burned attempting to extinguish the fire, and ultimately the entire building was destroyed. The adjacent church associated with the mission survived. The local Lakota community raised $400 to rebuild, and this in combination with the insurance money and support from the Episcopal church allowed for the school to be re-constructed the following year.

=== Disease outbreaks ===
In 1913, the United States Public Health Service identified trachoma, an infectious disease that can cause blindness if left untreated, as widespread on reservations. Risk factors included poverty, crowded conditions, and a lack of clean water. As part of a national effort to survey the problem, Native Americans from across the country were assessed. At St. Elizabeth's, 61.3% of the students examined were found to have trachoma. There was no potable water at St. Elizabeth's at this time; it had to be hauled in buckets from Wakpala by mission workers and students. The prevalence of trachoma at reservation schools led to the Snyder Act of 1921, which authorized funds to improve healthcare services for federally recognized tribes. The school also had a typhoid outbreak in the mid-1910s. In response, the Lula Owl Gloyne, a Cherokee-Catawba nurse working at the school, started boiling water to prevent future infections.

=== Decline and closure ===
In 1955, Ella Deloria, daughter of Reverend Philip Joseph Deloria, was asked by Bishop Conrad H. Gesner to lead St. Elizabeth's. She and her sister Susie agreed to take the position on a temporary basis, until someone else could be found. Ella Deloria was director from 1955 to 1958. She described a school in a state of decline. There was a lack of funds, a lack of qualified teachers who were willing to relocate to the remote area, and a school district had recently been established nearby in Wakpala.

Ella Deloria believed the Episcopal Church could provide structure and support to Indian people. In Speaking of Indians, co-written with Vine Deloria in 1944, she argued that "the greatest interference with education was and always has been kinship and its duties." However, it cannot be said that her goal was to erase Indian culture and tradition, as she had also worked with anthropologist Franz Boas to document and preserve the Lakota language, as well as Sioux myths and dialects.

William McKissack Chapman succeeded Ella Deloria as director. A former Time-Life correspondent and journalist from Brooklyn, Chapman took the posting in hopes that the air would be beneficial for his son with asthma. He was director from 1958 until 1960, and later wrote a memoir about his experiences at the school. Although he expressed admiration for the resilience of the Lakota people and awareness of the effects of colonization, he was unable to connect with the culture of those attending the school or the community at large. St. Elizabeth's permanently closed in 1967.

== School life and conditions ==
=== Student body and attendance ===
The school had between 45-60 pupils, all boarders, during any given year. Both boys and girls were educated at the school. They ranged in age from six to 17 years of age.

=== Daily life and curriculum ===
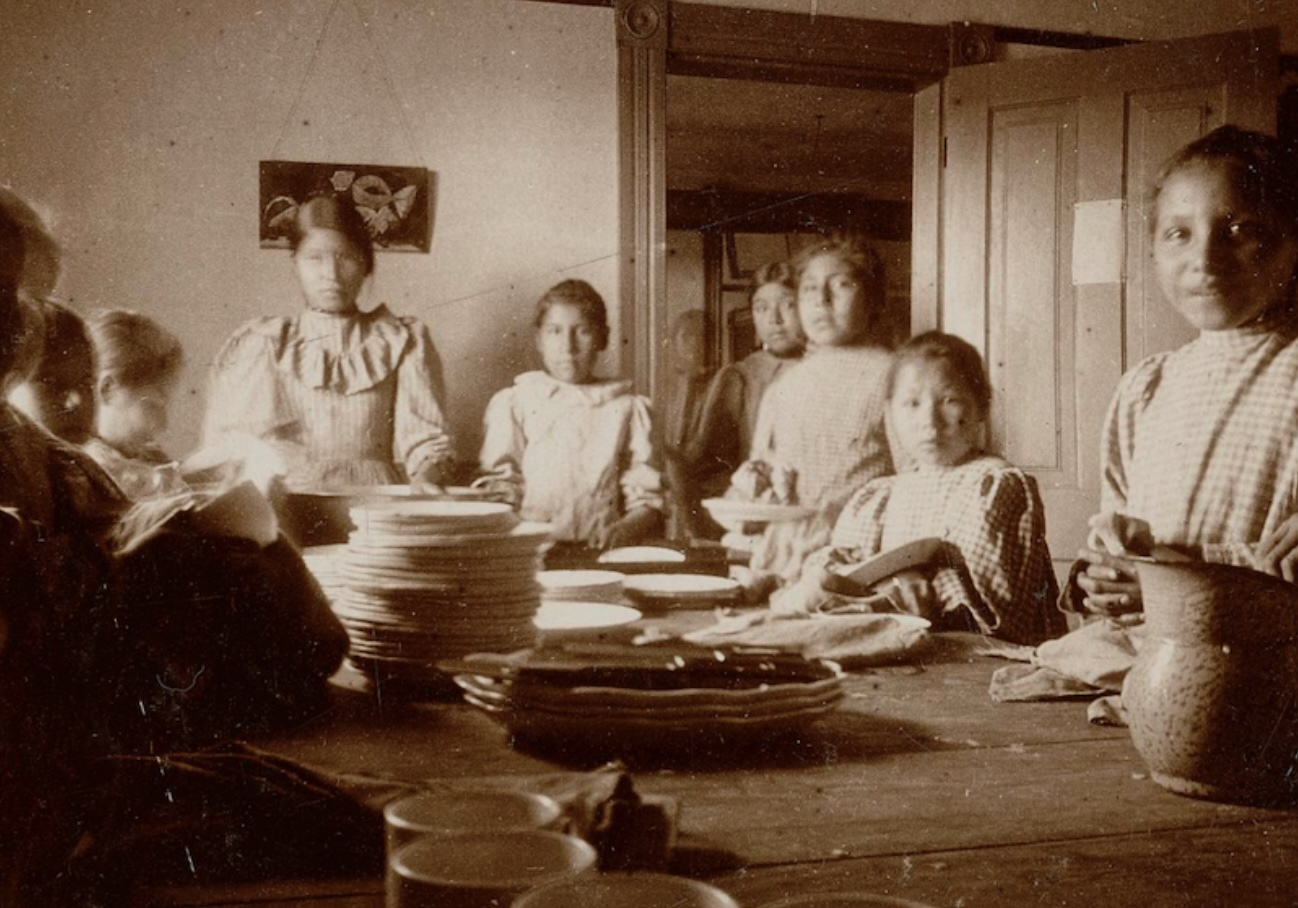
Hunkpapa Lakota girls drying dishes at St. Elizabeth's Mission School (c. 1900)

Indian boarding schools generally taught the same subjects as schools for white children. The main areas of study were reading, writing, mathematics, and geography. All classes were held in English, because the Commissioner of Indian Affairs required it. Since the boarding school was a Christian institution, students also studied catechism and religion.

As federal contracts became less plentiful in the 1890s, mission schools became dependent on the labor of their students to support the school's upkeep. Students at St. Elizabeth's spent at least an equal amount of time performing chores and physical labor than working on academic studies. The assignment of work details and chores differed on the basis of sex. Girls performed "bread-making, cooking, laundering, housework, sewing, mending, dressmaking, and fancy work," while the boys did the "farming, gardening, splitting wood, and hauling water."

== Impact and legacy ==
A 2005 doctoral thesis about the school's legacy concluded that “those who attended and lived at St. Elizabeth’s gained an education, became Christian, but... did not lose important cultural foundations which defined them as Lakota, or in a broader context, as Indian.” In 2021, mass graves of hundreds of Native children were discovered at the Kamloops Indian Residential School in Canada. Kamloops operated between 1890 until the late 1970s. Although the American and Canadian systems of reservation schools were not identical, the incident led to renewed media attention and scholarship devoted to the study of reservation schools in the United States.
