= Church of Our Most Merciful Saviour (Santee, Nebraska) =

Historic church in Nebraska, United States

- Episcopal Church
- U.S. National Register of Historic Places
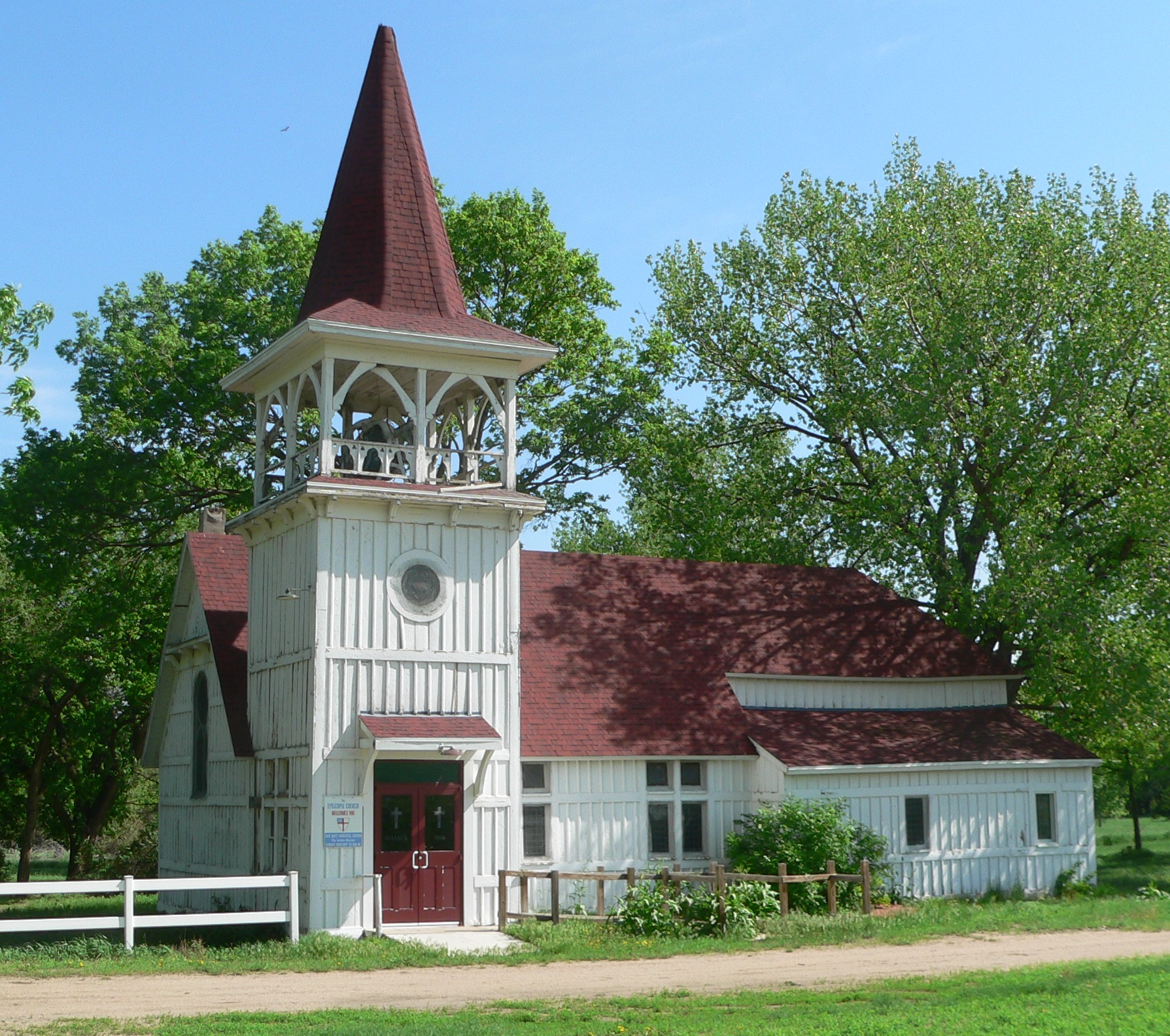

- Location within Nebraska Location within the United States
- Location: On the Missouri River in the Santee Indian Reservation, Santee, Nebraska
- Coordinates: 42°50′27.06″N 97°50′15.47″W
- Area: 0.5 acres (0.20 ha)
- Built: 1884
- NRHP reference No.: 72000754
- Added to NRHP: March 16, 1972

The Church of Our Most Merciful Saviour, also known as the Santee Mission, built in 1884, is a historic Carpenter Gothic style Episcopal church located on the Missouri River in the Santee Indian Reservation in Santee, Nebraska. Although its side windows are not arched, it otherwise exhibits all the common features of Carpenter Gothic churches: board and batten siding, lancet windows on the front along with a circular rosette window, belfry tower on the side and main entrance on the side though the belfry tower.

On March 16, 1972, it was added to the National Register of Historic Places as the Episcopal Church.

It is one of two churches in Nebraska included in the Santee Mission of the Episcopal Diocese of South Dakota. It is served by the Rev. Patricia White Horse Carda.

== See also ==
- Congregational Church and Manse (Santee, Nebraska), built 1870–71, also NRHP-listed in Santee
