= Harold Jones (bishop) =

American bishop

The Right Reverend Harold Jones
- Suffragan Bishop of South Dakota
- Church: Episcopal Church
- Diocese: South Dakota
- Elected: September 25, 1971
- In office: 1972–1976

Orders
- Ordination: September 18, 1941 by W. Blair Roberts
- Consecration: January 11, 1972 by John E. Hines

Personal details
- Born: December 14, 1909 Mitchell, South Dakota, United States
- Died: November 12, 2002 (aged 92) Chandler, Arizona, United States
- Buried: Pine Lawn Memorial Park, Rapid City, South Dakota
- Denomination: Anglican
- Parents: Stephen S. Jones, Ida Edna Holmes
- Spouse: Blossom Thelma Steele (m. 1938; died 1939)
- Children: 3
- Education: Northern State Teachers College; Seabury-Western Theological Seminary

Harold Stephen Jones (December 14, 1909 - November 12, 2002) was an American bishop of the Episcopal Church who served as the Suffragan Bishop of South Dakota from 1972 to 1976. Jones was the first Native American bishop in the Episcopal Church.

== Early life and education ==
Jones was born in Mitchell, South Dakota on December 14, 1909, to Stephen S. Jones and Ida Edna Holmes. He was raised by his grandparents, the Reverend William Holmes and his wife Rebecca, in Niobrara, Nebraska, and Wakpala, South Dakota, where his grandfather served mission churches. He was educated at the high school in Wakpala, South Dakota, and then at the Northern State Teachers College where he graduated with a Bachelor of Science degree in 1935. He also earned a Licentiate of Theology from Seabury-Western Theological Seminary in 1938. In 1972, Seabury-Western Seminary awarded him an honorary Doctor of Divinity degree.

== Ordained ministry ==
Jones was ordained deacon in December 1938, and priest in September 1941, by Bishop W. Blair Roberts of South Dakota. He married Blossom Thelma Steele on December 14, 1938, and together had three children, two of whom died soon after birth. From 1938 until 1941, he served as deacon-in-charge of Christ Church, St. John's Church, and St. Jude's Church in the Pine Ridge Indian Reservation, and a missionary in Oglala, South Dakota. In 1941, he became assistant priest of the same charges and retained the posts till 1947. In 1947 he became the superintending presbyter of the Cheyenne River Mission at the Cheyenne River Indian Reservation, while in 1952 he was appointed superintending presbyter at the Pine Ridge Indian Reservation. Between 1956 and 1968, he served as vicar of Trinity Church in Wahpeton, North Dakota, and at a time also as director of religious education at the Wahpeton Indian School. In 1968 he became director of the Good Shepherd Mission in Fort Defiance, Arizona.

=== Bishop ===
On September 25, 1971, Jones was elected Suffragan Bishop of South Dakota, and was consecrated on January 11, 1972, at St. Joseph's Cathedral, Sioux Falls, South Dakota, by Presiding Bishop John E. Hines. Jones retired early in 1976 after suffering a stroke after a year of episcopal ministry. He ministered in Rapid City, South Dakota until 1996 when he moved to Arizona to live with his daughter. He died on November 12, 2002, at a hospital in Chandler, Arizona.
