= George Biller Jr. =

Bishop of the Episcopal Diocese of South Dakota

The Right Reverend George Biller Jr. D.D.
- Bishop of South Dakota
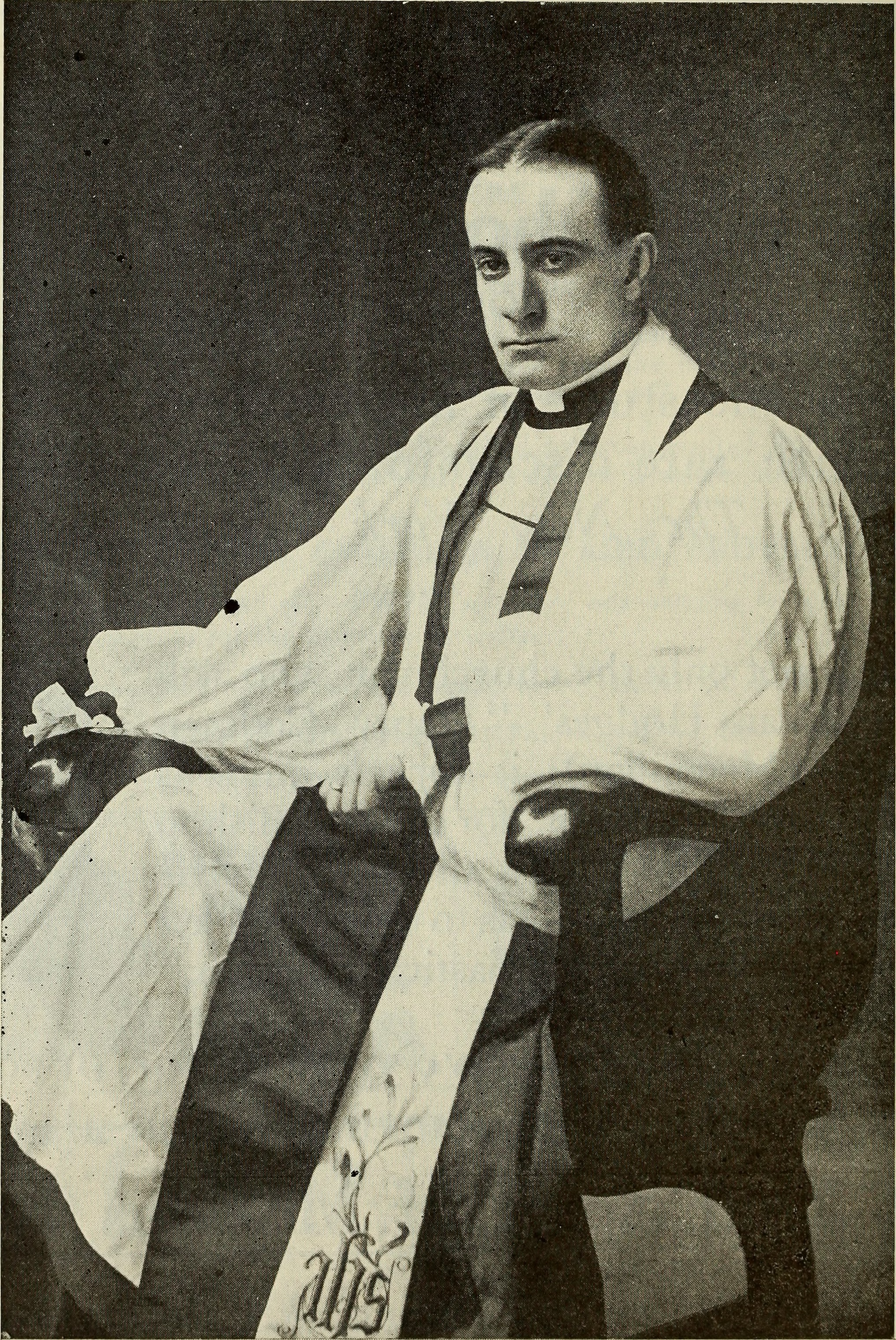
- Church: Episcopal Church
- Diocese: South Dakota
- Elected: April 11, 1912
- In office: 1912–1915
- Predecessor: Frederick Foote Johnson
- Successor: Hugh L. Burleson

Orders
- Ordination: December 21, 1898 by Francis Key Brooke
- Consecration: September 18, 1912 by Daniel S. Tuttle

Personal details
- Born: February 25, 1874 London, England
- Died: October 22, 1915 (aged 41)
- Buried: Woodlawn Cemetery, Sioux Falls, South Dakota
- Denomination: Anglican
- Parents: George Biller & Clara E. Smith
- Spouse: Edna Peninger (m. 1903)
- Education: Berkeley Divinity School

George Biller Jr. (February 25, 1874 – October 22, 1915) was Missionary Bishop of the Episcopal diocese of South Dakota, serving from 1912 to 1915.

== Early life and education ==
Biller was born in London, England on February 25, 1874, to George Biller and Clara E. Smith. In 1887, he emigrated to the United States. He was educated at St Austin's School in New York City, and then at the Berkeley Divinity School, from which he graduated in 1898.

== Ordained ministry ==
Biller was made deacon on June 5, 1898, by Bishop Thomas A. Starkey of Newark. He began ministry in the Oklahoma Territory, and was ordained priest on December 21, 1898, by Bishop Francis Key Brooke of Oklahoma. While in Oklahoma, he was also chaplain at All Saints' Hospital in McAlester, Oklahoma. He remained in Oklahoma for five years, until 1903, when he became vicar of the Church of the Incarnation in New York City. In 1908, he became vicar of Calvary Church in Sioux Falls, South Dakota, while in 1909, when the church was designated a cathedral, he was installed as its first dean.

== Bishop ==
On April 11, 1912, Biller was elected Missionary Bishop of South Dakota on the third ballot, and was consecrated on September 18, 1912, with Presiding Bishop Daniel S. Tuttle as chief consecrator. He died suddenly on October 22, 1915.
