= KZYK =

Radio station at Nebraska Indian Community College in Santee, Nebraska

- Santee, Nebraska; United States
- Frequency: 88.9 MHz
- Branding: "KZYK 88.9 FM"

Programming
- Format: Variety

Ownership
- Owner: Nebraska Indian Community College

Technical information
- Licensing authority: FCC
- Facility ID: 173513
- Class: A
- ERP: 1,000 watts
- HAAT: 40 metres (130 ft)
- Transmitter coordinates: 42°49′46″N 97°51′15″W

Links
- Public license information: Public file; LMS
- Webcast: Listen Live
- Website: www.thenicc.edu/index.php/en/kzyk/radio

KZYK (88.9 FM) is a radio station licensed to serve the community of Santee, Nebraska. The station is owned by Nebraska Indian Community College, and airs a variety format.

The station was assigned the KZYK call letters by the Federal Communications Commission on February 10, 2011.
