= Episcopal Diocese of South Dakota =

Diocese of the Episcopal Church in the United States

Coordinates: 43°32′32″N 96°43′40″W

Diocese of South Dakota Dioecesis Dakota Meridiana

Location
- Country: United States
- Territory: South Dakota
- Ecclesiastical province: Province VI

Statistics
- Congregations: 79 (2025)
- Members: 5,377 (2025)

Information
- Denomination: Episcopal Church
- Established: September 23, 1971
- Cathedral: Calvary Cathedral
- Language: English, Dakota

Current leadership
- Bishop: Jonathan H. Folts

Map
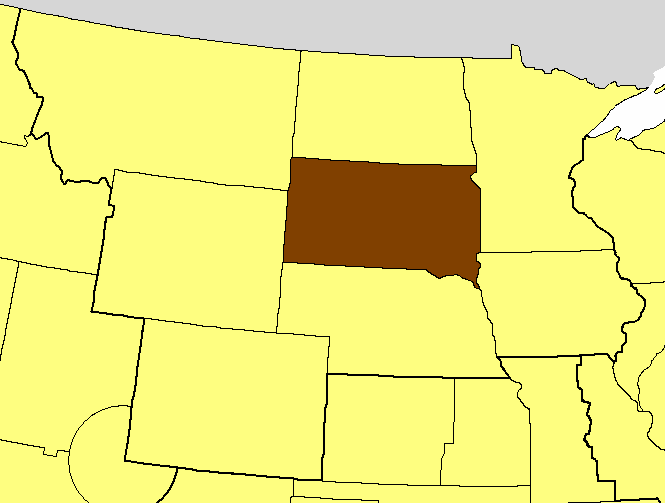
- Location of the Diocese of South Dakota

Website
- www.episcopalchurchsd.org

The Episcopal Diocese of South Dakota is a diocese of the Episcopal Church with jurisdiction over the state of South Dakota.

In 2025, the diocese reported average Sunday attendance (ASA) of 1,459 persons, a relative decrease from 1,924 in 2015. The most recent membership statistics (2025) showed 5,377 persons in 79 churches, a relative decrease from 8,938 in 2015. Plate and pledge income for the congregations of the diocese in 2025 was $1,773,418.

== History ==
The diocese was created in 1871 at the Missionary District of Niobrara. It adopted the name Missionary District of South Dakota in 1884. William Hobart Hare was consecrated as Missionary Bishop in 1873, and full Bishop and the district concentrated its efforts on Native Americans. The original boundaries of the district "covered a territory north of the Niobrara River and west of the Missouri, all the way to the Rockies." The Missionary District became the Diocese of South Dakota in 1971, at which time there were 18 parishes, 24 mission congregations, 90 churches and chapels in the Niobrara Deanery, and 4 Episcopal schools.

== Structure and membership ==
The diocese is composed of 76 member congregations in South Dakota, two in Nebraska and one in Minnesota, organized geographically into seven deaneries.

The diocese is made up of seven geographical deaneries: Black Hills (10 churches), Pine Ridge (7), Rosebud (15), Central (7), Northwest (17), Northeast (10) and Eastern (12). There is one church located in Minnesota (St. John’s in Browns Valley in the Northeast Deanery), and two in Nebraska: Blessed Redeemer, in Howe Creek and Our Most Merciful Savior, in Santee. Its cathedral, Calvary Cathedral, is located in Sioux Falls.

The Diocese of South Dakota has a multicultural membership and history. It has a special relationship with its Native American population. Approximately half of the 12,000 baptized Episcopalians in South Dakota are either Dakota or Lakota Sioux. The diocese also includes two congregations composed of Sudanese immigrants in Sioux Falls.

== List of bishops ==
The bishops of South Dakota have been:

1. William Hobart Hare, Missionary Bishop from (1873–1883), full Bishop (1883–1909)
  * Frederick Foote Johnson, assisting bishop (1905–1909)
2. Frederick Foote Johnson, (1910–1911)
3. George Biller, Jr. (1912–1915)
4. Hugh L. Burleson (1916–1931)
  * William P. Remington, suffragan (1918–1922)
  * W. Blair Roberts, suffragan (1922–1931)
5. W. Blair Roberts, (1931–1954)
  * Conrad H. Gesner, coadjutor (1945–1954)
6. Conrad H. Gesner, (1954–1970)
  * Lyman C. Ogilby, coadjutor (1964–1970)
7. Walter H. Jones (1970–1983)
  * Harold S. Jones, suffragan (1972–1976)
  (Note: Jones was the first Native American bishop in the Episcopal Church)
8. Craig B. Anderson, (1984–1992)
9. Creighton Leland Robertson, (1994–2009),
10. John T. Tarrant, (2009–2019)
11. Jonathan H. Folts, (2019–present)

== Historic churches ==
Calvary Cathedral in Sioux Falls

Diocesan churches listed on the National Register of Historic Places include:

- Church of Our Most Merciful Saviour, Santee, Nebraska
- Emmanuel Episcopal Church (Rapid City, South Dakota)
- Holy Fellowship Episcopal Church (Greenwood, South Dakota)
- St. Andrew's Episcopal Church (Scotland, South Dakota)
- The Episcopal Church of All Angels (Spearfish, South Dakota)

== See also ==
- Historical list of bishops of the Episcopal Church in the United States of America
