= Congregational Church and Manse (Santee, Nebraska) =

Historic church in Nebraska, United States

- U.S. National Register of Historic Places
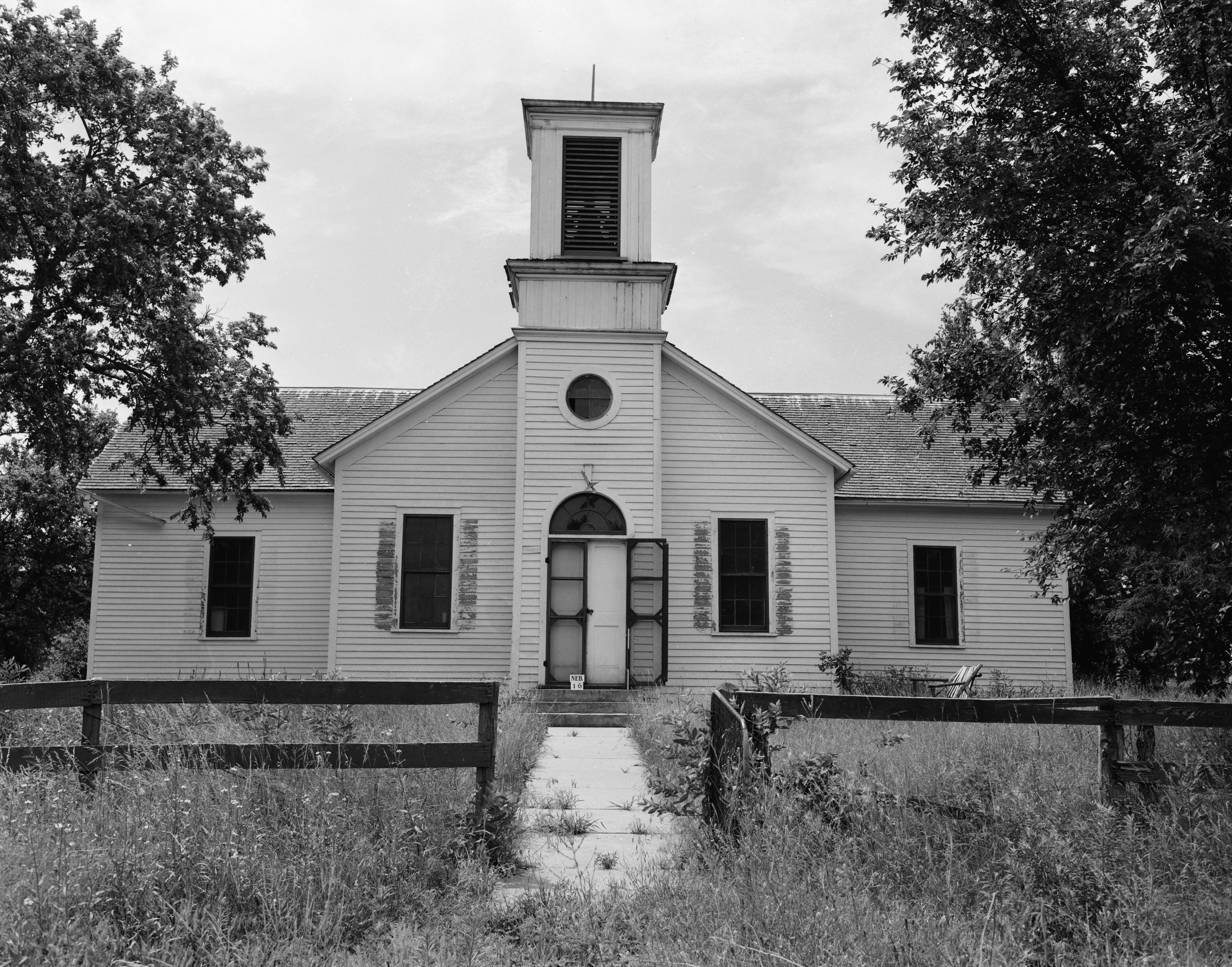

- Location within Nebraska Location within the United States
- Location: Santee Indian Reservation, Santee, Nebraska
- Coordinates: 42°50′19″N 97°50′46″W
- Area: less than one acre
- Built: 1870
- NRHP reference No.: 72000753
- Added to NRHP: March 16, 1972

The Congregational Church and Manse in Santee, Nebraska, on the Santee Sioux Reservation in Knox County, Nebraska, is a listing on the National Register of Historic Places.

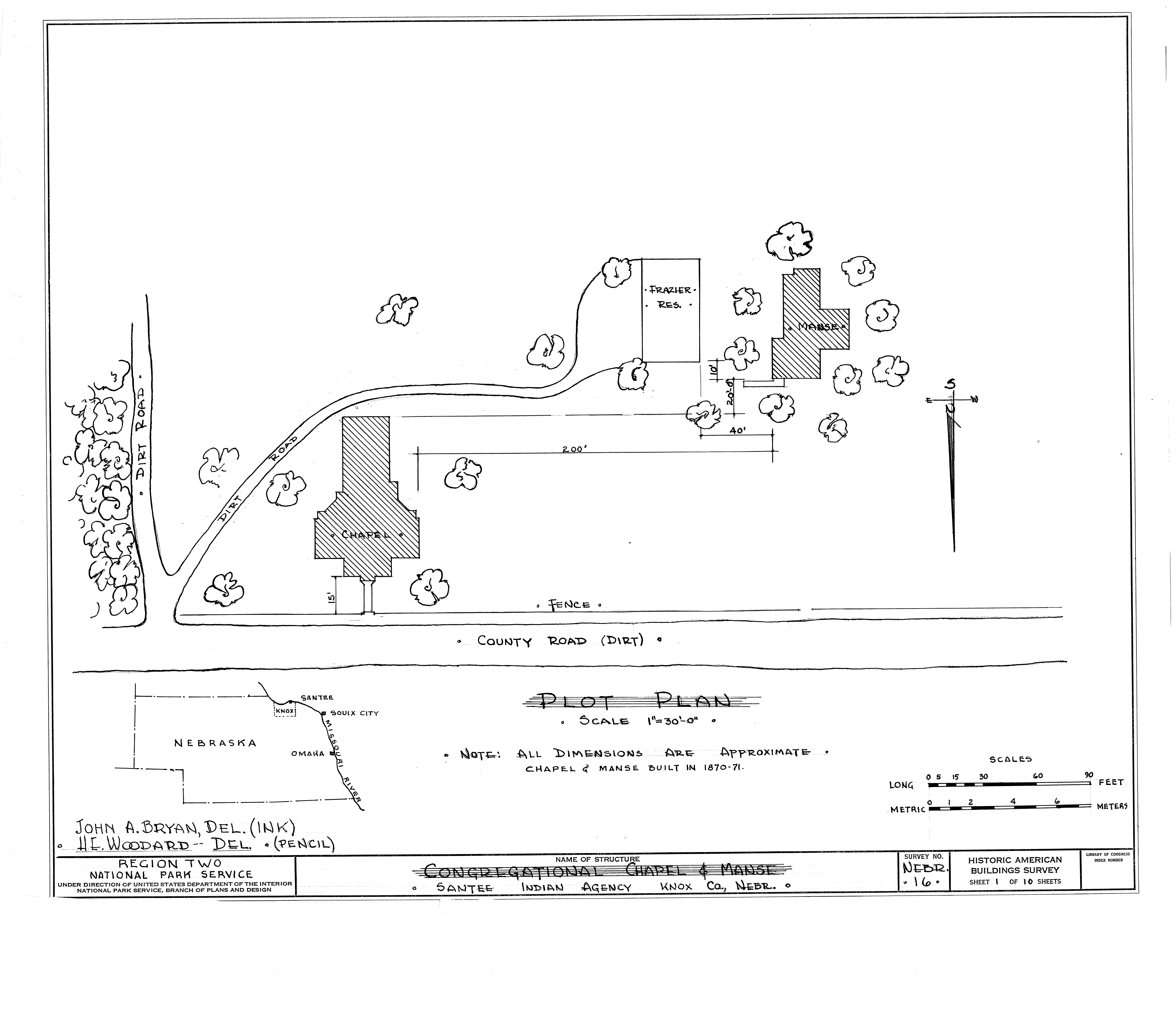
Site plan

The Pilgrim Congregational Church and its manse are the two buildings in the listing. Both were built in 1870-71 after the arrival of missionary Reverend Alfred L. Riggs and his wife Mrs. Mary B. Riggs. Riggs (or his father?) was known as "Zitkadanwaste" among the Sioux and had worked with the Santee Sioux in their native Minnesota as far back as 1837.(?) Riggs' father began working with the Sioux in 1857.

Riggs operated the Santee Normal Training School there. The school was founded by the American Board in 1870, but control transferred to the American Missionary Association (A.M.A.) in 1982.

The church was extended to the rear in 1919.

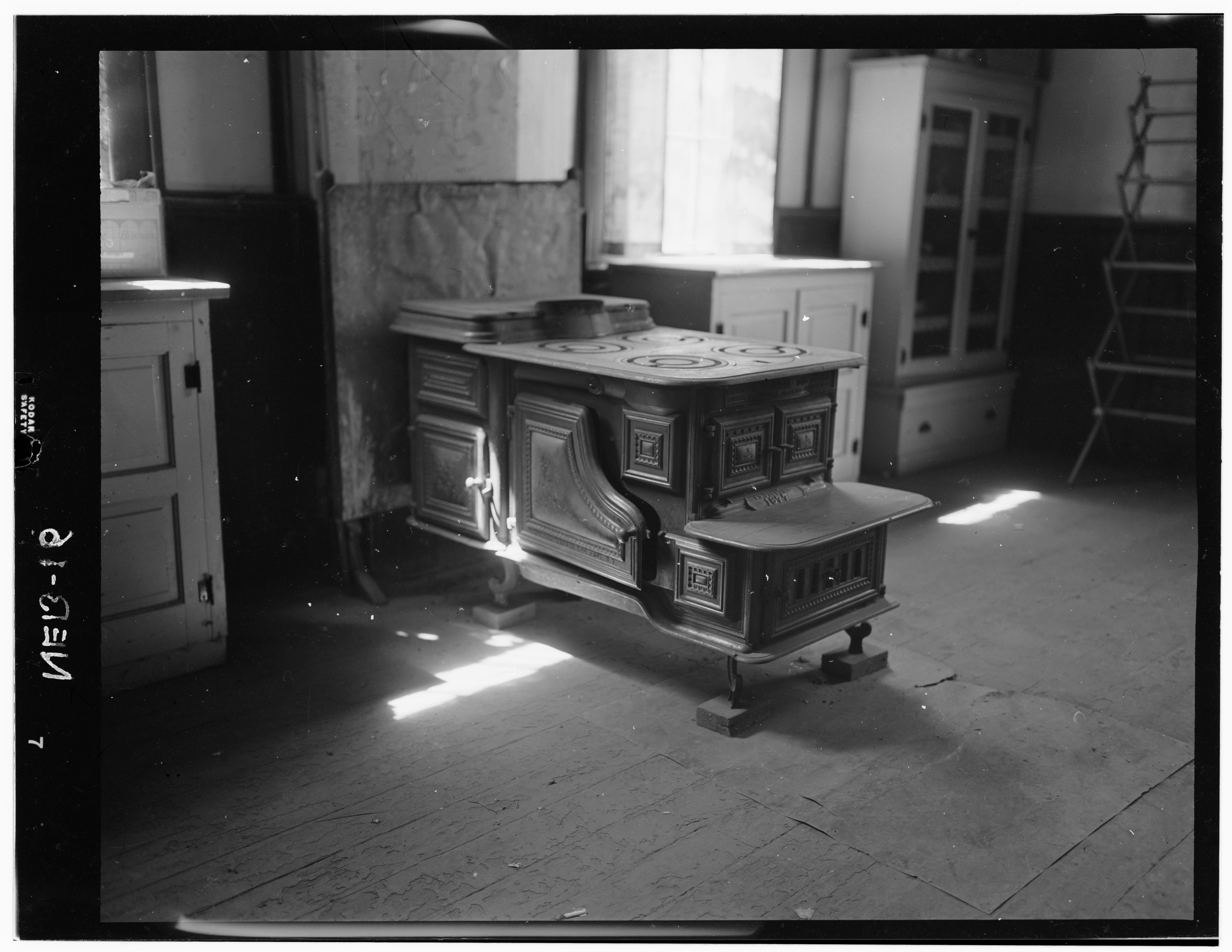
Stove in manse

The chapel and manse were documented by the Historic American Buildings Survey in 1952, which produced measured drawings and photos of both.

In 1970, both buildings were intact and unaltered; the manse needed a coat of paint and the church needed minor repairs inside.

The pair was listed on the NRHP in 1972.

The Santee Normal Training School operated from 1870 to 1936. Albert Riggs was principal and had two assistants. By 1885 there were 18 buildings on the school's 400 acres (160 ha).

Riggs died in 1916 and was buried about one mile east. His son Frederick Riggs replaced him in running the school.
