= Renée Sans Souci =

American Indian educator (born 1962)

- Born: Suzette Sans Souci; 1962 (age 63–64); Lincoln, Nebraska
- Citizenship: Omaha Tribe of Nebraska and American
- Education: Nebraska Indian Community College (Associate)
- Alma mater: University of Nebraska–Lincoln (Bachelor)
- Website: sacredhorsewoman.blogspot.com

Renée Sans Souci (born Suzette Sans Souci) is an Indigenous educator, artist, and activist born in Lincoln, Nebraska in 1962. Sans Souci is a citizen of the Omaha Tribe of Nebraska.

She is the co-leader of the Niskíthe Prayer Camp, located in Lincoln, Nebraska. Sans Souci is also known for work as an advocate for the Missing and Murdered Indigenous Women (MMIW) movement, an Omaha spiritual practitioner, and a cultural consultant.

== Early life ==
Renée Sans Souci was born in Lincoln, Nebraska, in 1962 to two members of the American Indian Movement. Her Omaha (UMÓⁿHOⁿ) name is Sacred Horsewomen. Sans Souci and her family lived in Montana for nearly a year. In 1970, the Sans Souci family moved back to Lincoln. In 1980, Renée and her family moved north to Macy, Nebraska, located on the Omaha Reservation. There, Sans Souci became familiar with Native spiritual and medicinal practices. In 1985, she began a journey on a spiritual path when her father became ill, and a Lakota medicine man traveled to the Omaha Reservation to treat him.

== Education ==
Renée Sans Souci received her degree in education from the University of Nebraska–Lincoln through the Native American Educator Ladder Program. Sans Souci also obtained an associate degree in art at the Nebraska Indian Community College. Sans Souci is credentialed through the Indigenous Roots Program at the University of Nebraska-Lincoln. In addition to degree programs, Sans Souci also spent time learning spiritual and traditional native practices from Ojibwe leaders in Minnesota during the years of 2007 and 2008. Through this education along with apprenticeships and vision quests, Sans Souci became an Omaha spiritual practitioner.

== Career ==
After graduating from the University of Nebraska–Lincoln, Renée Sans Souci worked for the State Department of Education and the Path of the Sun Learning Academy. Following that, Sans Souci worked for the Minnesota Indian Women's Resource Center, which directly relates to her activism in the MMIW movement. Currently, Sans Souci is the co-leader of the Niskíthe Prayer camp where she serves as an organizer, cultural consultant, and educator. Sans Souci is also a teaching artist at the Lied Center for Performing Arts, and has been since 2009, where she is recognized as a Kennedy Partner in Education and a Lied Center Resident Artist. She uses her experiences and activism to teach about environmental justice, tribal history, art history and poetry at the Lied Center. She is also a practitioner of traditional healing.

Sans Souci travels across the United States, educating others on Native history, languages, spiritual practices and colonization. One of her most notable presentations was given at the Smithsonian American Women's History Museum, titled Native American Women Activists: Resistance, Resilience, and Passing the Torch. Sans Souci has also appeared as an interviewee for the America Masters Special: The First American Indian Doctor, a documentary about Susan La Flesche Picotte.

Some of her work as a cultural consultant has given her the opportunity to work on Crane on Earth In Sky, a puppet show by Heather Henson and with Christopher Cartmill on The Nebraska Dispatches.

== Activism ==
Renée Sans Souci is involved in a variety of Indigenous movements. She volunteers for the Missing and Murdered Indigenous Women movement and the Native American Women's Task Force of Nebraska, both of which address the high rates of violence against Indigenous women in North America. Sans Souci has a personal connection to the Missing and Murdered Indigenous Women, as her niece was murdered, along with one other woman, on the Omaha Reservation in 2020. Sans Souci also works with Water Protector movement. With the Water Protectors in Minnesota, she protested the Line 3 pipeline. This experience allowed her to speak at the University of Nebraska–Lincoln, for Sustain UNL.

In addition to these activist organizations she participates in, she serves as a board member for Nebraskans for Peace, Grinding Stone Collective, Stand in for Nebraska, Nebraska Indian Child Welfare Coalition, Nebraska Steering Committee for Project Learning Tree, and Project WET. She was also a volunteer for the Tribal Education Department National Assembly where she learned of decolonization practices that she uses in her teachings throughout the Great Plains. In her hometown of Lincoln, Sans Souci protested against Lincoln development and expansion, which could not only close Niskíthe Prayer Camp but also endanger the Fish Farm Sweat Lodge, which both reside on important historically native land for the Omaha and Otoe-Missouria people. For her work as an advocate for the native community in Lincoln, Sans Souci was a finalist for the Inspire Founders Award. Part of Renée's volunteer work includes speaking at events and conferences. In 2022, she was a featured speaker on the importance of the Platte River at the Platte River Basin Conference.
