= Conrad H. Gesner =

Bishop of the Episcopal Diocese of South Dakota

The Right Reverend Conrad Herbert Gesner D.D., S.T.D.
- Bishop of South Dakota
- Church: Episcopal Church
- Diocese: South Dakota
- Elected: May 2, 1945
- In office: 1954–1970
- Predecessor: W. Blair Roberts
- Successor: Walter H. Jones
- Previous post: Coadjutor Bishop of South Dakota (1945-1954)

Orders
- Ordination: November 1927 by Hugh L. Burleson
- Consecration: May 2, 1945 by Henry St. George Tucker

Personal details
- Born: August 30, 1901 Detroit Lakes, Minnesota, United States
- Died: September 1, 1993 (aged 92) Sioux Falls, South Dakota, United States
- Denomination: Anglican
- Parents: Anthon Temple Gesner & Blanche Louise Pinniger
- Spouse: Betty Merrell (m. 1927)
- Children: 3
- Education: Trinity College; General Theological Seminary

Conrad Herbert Gesner (August 30, 1901 - September 1, 1993) was bishop of the Episcopal Diocese of South Dakota from 1953 until his retirement in 1970.

== Early life and education ==
Gesner was born on August 30, 1901, in Detroit Lakes, Minnesota, to the Reverend Anthon Temple Gesner and Blanche Louise Pinniger. He was educated at Ridgefield School in Ridgefield, Connecticut. He then studied at Trinity College from where he graduated with a Bachelor of Arts in 1923, and was awarded a Doctor of Divinity in 1945. He also graduated with a Bachelor of Divinity from the General Theological Seminary in 1927, and earned a Doctor of Sacred Theology in 1946.

== Ordained ministry ==
Gesner was ordained deacon in April 1927 and priest in November 1927 by Bishop Hugh L. Burleson of South Dakota. Gesner served as Canon Missioner at Calvary Cathedral in Sioux Falls, South Dakota between 1927 and 1929, rector of Trinity Church in Pierre, South Dakota between 1929 and 1933, and then as rector of the Church of St John the Evangelist in Saint Paul, Minnesota between 1933 and 1945.

== Bishop ==
Gesner was elected Coadjutor Bishop of South Dakota by the House of Bishops on May 2, 1945, and consecrated on May 2, 1945. He succeeded as Missionary Bishop of the District of South Dakota on January 1, 1954. He retired in 1970 and served as assistant bishop in Western Massachusetts and Connecticut. Gesner died on September 1, 1993, at McKennan Hospital in Sioux Falls.

== Personal life ==
He married Betty Magee Merrell on June 23, 1927, and together they had three children. He married Claudia Dorland (1911-2001) on June 10, 1970.
