= W. Blair Roberts =

American bishop

The Right Reverend W. Blair Roberts
- Bishop of South Dakota
- Church: Episcopal Church
- Diocese: South Dakota
- Elected: September 29, 1931
- In office: 1931–1954
- Predecessor: Hugh L. Burleson
- Successor: Conrad H. Gesner

Orders
- Ordination: June 20, 1909 by Frederick Foote Johnson
- Consecration: December 6, 1922 by Daniel S. Tuttle

Personal details
- Born: December 10, 1881 Detroit, Michigan, United States
- Died: April 25, 1964 (aged 82) Sioux Falls, South Dakota, United States
- Buried: Woodlawn Cemetery, Sioux Falls, South Dakota
- Denomination: Anglican
- Parents: William Jackson Roberts, Jane Eliza Fisher
- Spouse: Meta Kemble Jackson (m. 1910)

William Blair Roberts (December 10, 1881 - April 25, 1964) was a bishop in The Episcopal Church, serving in South Dakota.

== Early life and education ==
Roberts was born on December 10, 1881, in Detroit, Michigan, the son of William Jackson Roberts and Jane Eliza Fisher. He was educated at the public school of Hartford, Connecticut, and then studied at Trinity College, graduating with a Bachelor of Arts in 1905, and being awarded a Doctor of Divinity in 1923. He also enrolled at Berkeley Divinity School, from which he graduated with a Bachelor of Divinity in 1908. Berkeley gave him an honorary Doctor of Divinity in 1923.

== Ordained ministry ==
Roberts was ordained deacon on June 3, 1908, by Bishop Chauncey B. Brewster of Connecticut, and priest on June 20, 1909, by Bishop Frederick Foote Johnson. He served as a missionary in Rosebud, South Dakota between 1908 and 1922. He also served as a chaplain in the American Expeditionary Forces between August 1918 and June 1919. In 1917, he also became Dean of Rosebud.

=== Bishop ===
On December 6, 1922, he was consecrated suffragan bishop of South Dakota, in Calvary Cathedral, Sioux Falls. On September 29, 1931, he was elected Bishop of South Dakota, serving until his retirement on January 1, 1954.
