= Crow King =

Hunkpapa Sioux chief (died 1884)

- Died: April 5, 1884
- Military career
- Conflicts: Great Sioux War of 1876

Crow King (in Lakota Kȟaŋǧí Yátapi), also known as Medicine Bag That Burns, Burns The Medicine Bag or simply Medicine Bag; was a Hunkpapa Sioux war chief at the time of the Battle of Little Big Horn. Crow King was one of Sitting Bull's war chiefs at the battle, he led eighty warriors against Custer's men on Calhoun Hill and Finley Ridge. For the duration of the battle of Little Bighorn, Crow King and his band of eighty warriors attacked Custer from the south, allowing Crazy Horse and Gall to surround the 7th Cavalry. Crow King died April 5, 1884; according to the April 11, 1884, Bismarck Tribune, he died of "quick consumption" from a long-lasting cold and received the rites and sacraments of the Catholic Church. The location of his burial is unknown.

His orphaned daughters, Mary Laura Crow King "Weasel" (Hintunkasan) (1876–1889) and Emma Crow King "Red Deer Kid" (Tingleskaluta) (born 1880) married Paul Cournoyer and moved to Armour, South Dakota, with their two children.

== See also ==
- Sitting Bull
- Battle of Little Bighorn
- Crazy Horse
- Chief Gall
- Sioux
- General Custer
- Hunkpapa
