= Nebraska Indian Community College =

Tribal land-grant community college in Nebraska, U.S.

- Type: Public tribal land-grant community college
- Established: 1973
- Affiliations: Omaha, Santee Sioux & Winnebago reservations
- Academic affiliations: Space-grant
- President: Micheal Oltrogge
- Students: 95
- Location: Macy, Santee, and South Sioux City, Nebraska, United States
- Campus: Rural
- Nickname: Buffaloes
- Website: www.thenicc.edu

Nebraska Indian Community College (NICC) is a public tribal land-grant community college with three locations in Nebraska: Macy on the Omaha Tribe reservation, Santee on the Santee Sioux reservation, and the urban South Sioux City.

== History ==
Nebraska Indian Community College began in July 1973 as the American Indian Satellite Community College under a grant from the Fund for the Improvement of Post-secondary Education. The grant was administered through Northeast Technical Community College in Norfolk, Nebraska, to provide post-secondary education on the Omaha, Santee Sioux, and the Winnebago reservations. In 1979, Nebraska Indian Community College established itself as a fully independent two-year college chartered by the governments of three Nebraska Indian Tribes following the enactment of the Tribally Controlled Community College Assistance Act. In 1994, the college was designated a land-grant college alongside 31 other tribal colleges.

In 1996 the Winnebago chartered the Little Priest Tribal College on its reservation. It is named after one of its notable chiefs and is open to students of other tribes as well.

== Academics ==
NICC offers associate degrees in applied science, arts, and science, as well as certificates. The concentrations offered are carpentry, business, early childhood education, general liberal arts, human services, Native American studies (including a public and tribal administration minor), general science studies, paraeducator/pre-teacher certification, alcohol and drug counselling, business administration, community counselling, entrepreneurship, and pre-nursing.

As of 2011, it is one of seven tribal colleges in the U.S. to offer a degree related to tribal administration.

== Campus ==
The American Indian Satellite Community College established classrooms and administrative offices in communities on each reservation, with the central office located in Winnebago. In serving its clientele, Nebraska Indian Community College has made a variety of cultural, educational, and social resources available in isolated and economically underdeveloped areas. The college libraries at each campus are developing collections of resources important to the history and culture of each tribe, and the nation.

== Governance ==
An eight-member board of directors governs NICC. In 1979, the schools of the American Indian Higher Education Consortium, of which the Nebraska Indian Community College is a member, succeeded in persuading Congress to pass and fund Public Law 95-471, the Tribally Controlled Community College Act. Nebraska Indian Community College and other tribally controlled community colleges thus became eligible for direct funding from the federal government as land grant institutions. NICC established itself as a fully independent two-year college. It was granted a charter by the governments of each of the Indian tribes within Nebraska.

In June 1981, the North Central Association of Colleges and Schools (NCA) approved the college for accreditation at the associate degree granting level. The institution was granted a charter by each of the three Nebraska Indian Tribes. A board of trustees composed of three members from each tribe was appointed by the individual Tribal Councils to govern the college. To reflect its independent status, the Board renamed the institution the Nebraska Indian Community College.

== See also ==
- American Indian College Fund (AICF)
