= Henry Owl =

Cherokee educator, activist, historian (1895–1980)

Henry McClain Owl
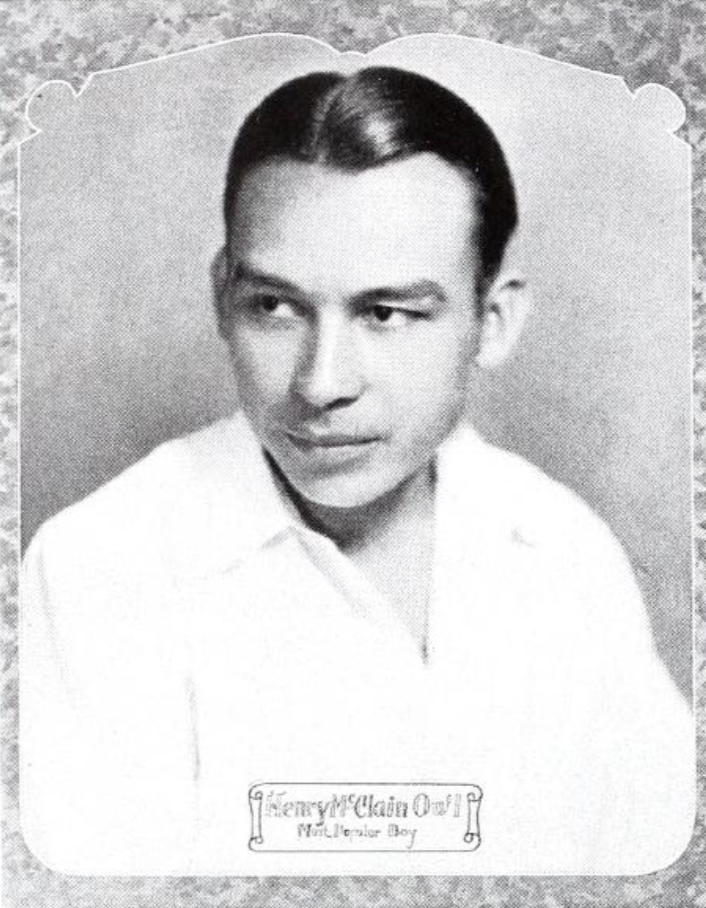
- Owl, circa 1928
- Born: August 1, 1895; Qualla Boundary, North Carolina, United States
- Died: March 1, 1980 (aged 84)
- Education: Hampton University, Lenoir–Rhyne University (BA), University of North Carolina at Chapel Hill (MA)
- Occupations: Educator, principal, activist, historian
- Children: 1, Gladys Cardiff
- Relatives: Lula Owl Gloyne (sister)

Henry McClain Owl (August 1, 1895 – March 1, 1980), was a Native American educator, activist, and historian. He was a member of the Eastern Band of Cherokee Indians and was the first Native American and first person of color to attend the University of North Carolina. He received his master's degree in history from the University of North Carolina at Chapel Hill (UNC Chapel Hill) in 1929.

Owl used his master's thesis to combat a literacy test designed to prevent Cherokee Indians from voting. His testimony before congress regarding this discrimination contributed to a law granting the Eastern Band of Cherokee Indians citizenship and the right to vote. He also went by the name Henry Harris.

== Early life and education ==
Owl was born on August 1, 1895, in the Qualla Boundary in Western North Carolina. He was the son of Daniel Lloyd Owl, a Cherokee blacksmith, and Nettie Harris Owl, a Catawba traditional potter. He is listed on the Baker Roll as having a Cherokee blood quantum of half, and having a full Catawba mother. His older sister was Lula Owl Gloyne. Owl attended school through eighth grade on the reservation, and later enrolled in school at Hampton University. Until 1923, Hampton offered a free industrial training program for Native Americans.

He joined the United States Army and rose to the rank of sergeant in 1918.

Later, Owl became the first Native American to be admitted to Lenoir–Rhyne University, graduating in history in the class of 1928. Owl attended the University of North Carolina at Chapel Hill from 1928 to 1929, graduating with a Master of Arts degree in history. His dissertation was titled "The Eastern Band of Cherokee Indians: Before and After the Removal.” Owl's goal in writing his thesis was to combat racist myths and stereotype around Native Americans.

== Career ==
=== Voting activism ===
The year after Owl received his master's degree in 1929, Swain County, North Carolina, denied him the right to vote based on his presumed illiteracy as a Native American. Upon using his degree as proof of his literacy, he was still denied the vote based on the claim that, as a Cherokee Indian, he was not a United States citizen. Although the Indian Citizenship Act gave all Native Americans citizenship in 1924, voting was still regulated on a state-by-state basis. Owl subsequently testified before congress on this issue, resulting in legislation that granted citizenship and suffrage to all Eastern Band of Cherokee Indian members.

=== Bureau of Indian Affairs ===
Owl worked for the Bureau of Indian Affairs as a teacher and principal on reservations in North Carolina, Montana, and South Dakota. He later worked as a Veteran's Administration counselor in Seattle and as an inspector at Boeing. Due to fear of discrimination, when working outside reservations, Owl began using his wife's last name, "Harris."

== Legacy ==
In 2011, the UNC American Indian Center created the Henry Owl Fund to support Cherokee language and culture instructional programs, as well as the Henry Owl Graduate Fellowship, which included a language immersion program at the Museum of the Cherokee People.

He was inducted into the Lenoir–Rhyne University's hall of fame in 2012 for his participation in the football (1925–1927) and baseball (1926–1928) teams.

In 2014, UNC Chapel Hill alumnus Andrew Vail created the Henry Owl Scholarship fund to provide needs-based funds to undergraduate American Studies majors.

In 2021, UNC Chapel Hill renamed their Student Affairs building in his honor: the Henry Owl Building.

Owl's daughter, Gladys Cardiff, is a poet and former professor at Oakland University in Michigan. Her father inspired her to pursue education and excellence in all aspects of life.

== Works ==
- Owl, Henry McClain (1929). "The Eastern Band of Cherokee Indians Before and After the Removal." Thesis (M.A.) – University of North Carolina at Chapel Hill.
