= Craig Anderson (bishop) =

American bishop (1942–2026)

The Right Reverend Craig Anderson
- Bishop of South Dakota
- Church: Episcopal Church
- Diocese: South Dakota
- Elected: March 1984
- In office: 1984–1992
- Predecessor: Walter H. Jones
- Successor: Creighton Robertson

Orders
- Ordination: 1975
- Consecration: July 27, 1984 by John Allin

Personal details
- Born: February 12, 1942 Glendale, California, U.S.
- Died: January 17, 2026 (aged 83) Sioux Falls, South Dakota, U.S.
- Denomination: Anglican
- Spouse: Lizbeth Johnston
- Children: 3
- Education: Valparaiso University; University of the South

Craig Barry Anderson (February 12, 1942 – January 17, 2026) was an American bishop of the Episcopal Church who served as the Bishop of South Dakota from 1984 to 1992.

== Background ==
Anderson was born in Glendale, California, on February 12, 1942. He studied at Valparaiso University, from which he graduated with a Bachelor of Arts degree in 1963. He then joined the United States Army. He graduated from the University of the South in theology in 1974. He also graduated with a Master of Arts in 1981, and a Doctor of Philosophy in 1985 from Valparaiso University.

Anderson died in Sioux Falls, South Dakota, on January 17, 2026, at the age of 83.

== Ordained ministry ==
Anderson was ordained deacon in 1974 and priest in 1975. He then became an army chaplain in 1976, and taught at the University of the South. He also held the C. K. Benedict Chair of Theology from 1978 to 1984. He was also head of the admissions committee and chaired the senior program. Subsequently, he served as priest-in-charge at Christ Church in Alto, Tennessee.

=== Bishop ===
Anderson was elected Bishop of South Dakota in March 1984, and was consecrated on July 27, 1984, at the Cathedral of Our Lady of Perpetual Help, Rapid City, South Dakota with Bishop John Allin as chief consecrator. He remained in South Dakota until his resignation in 1992, to become the eleventh president, dean and Professor of Theology at the General Theological Seminary in New York City. In 1998, he resigned his position at the seminary to become the eleventh headmaster of St. Paul's School in Concord, New Hampshire. Subsequently, he served as interim bishop in the Diocese of Vermont. In 2005, Anderson retired from St Paul's, two years ahead of schedule, over his compensation, handling of the school's money and other matters. This came about when the school came under investigation by tax authorities after falling short of its fund-raising goals. He then became the assistant bishop in the Diocese of Idaho and interim rector of St Thomas' Church in Sun Valley, Idaho. In 2007, he became rector of Emmanuel Church on Orcas Island, and served as assistant bishop in the Diocese of Olympia, until 2014. He then moved with his family to Taos, New Mexico.
