= Episcopal Church of All Angels =

Historic church in South Dakota, United States

- U.S. National Register of Historic Places
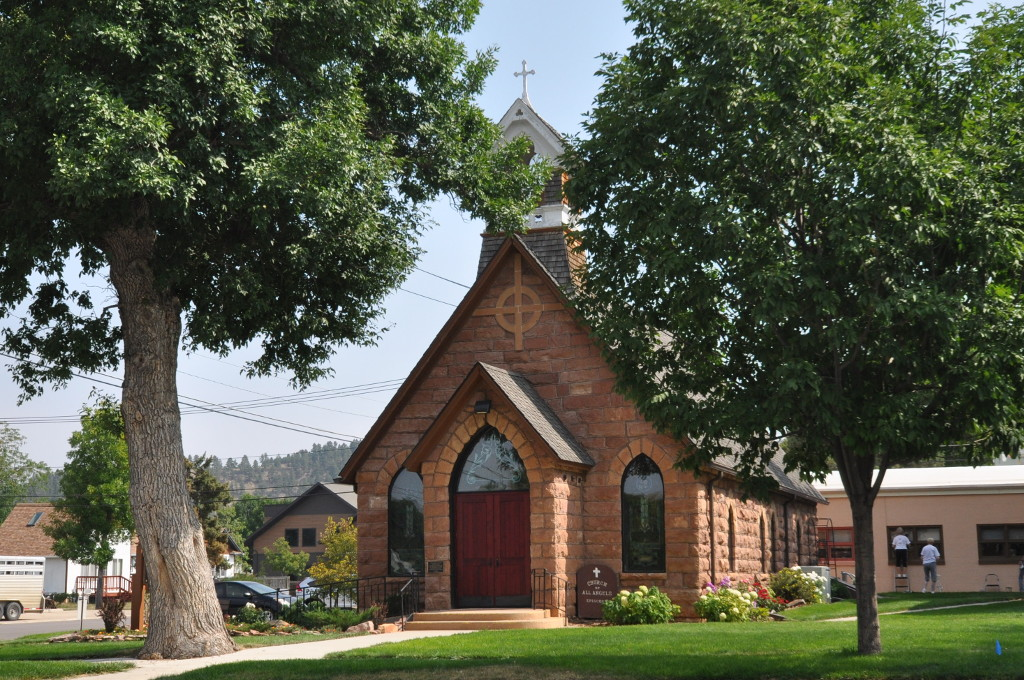

- Location within South Dakota Location within the United States
- Location: 129 W. Michigan, Spearfish, South Dakota
- Coordinates: 44°29′38″N 103°51′38″W
- Area: less than one acre
- Built: 1895
- Architectural style: Late Victorian
- NRHP reference No.: 76001743
- Added to NRHP: April 22, 1976

The Episcopal Church of All Angels is a historic church at 129 W. Michigan in Spearfish, South Dakota. It was built in 1895 and was added to the National Register in 1976. The church is a part of the Episcopal Diocese of South Dakota.

In 2015, the church reported 157 members; in 2023, it reported 203 members. Plate and pledge financial support reported by the church in 2024 was $60,284. Average Sunday Attendance (ASA) reported in 2024 was 60 persons. This was a relative decrease from ASA of 81 reported in 2017.

The church is served by a rector, the Venerable Rev. J. Clay Riley, as well as a deacon, the Reverend Deacon Bonnie Slusher.

== History ==
Before the building of the only Episcopal church in Spearfish, Episcopalian worshipers practiced in their homes. The great-granddaughter of Alexander Hamilton donated money for a church to be built as a tribute to her great-grandfather, although she never visited Spearfish. After the sandstone church was built in 1895, it was damaged on the interior by a fire, and Ms. Hamilton sent money to repair the church. Additionally, Ms. Hamilton sent Christmas gifts to children for Sunday school.
