= John Tarrant (bishop) =

American bishop (1952–2020)

The Right Reverend John Tarrant
- Bishop of South Dakota
- Church: Episcopal Church
- Diocese: South Dakota
- Elected: 2009
- In office: 2010–2019
- Predecessor: Creighton Leland Robertson
- Successor: Jonathan Folts
- Previous post: Coadjutor Bishop of South Dakota (2009-2010)

Orders
- Ordination: February 11, 1984 by Alexander Doig Stewart
- Consecration: October 31, 2009 by Katharine Jefferts Schori

Personal details
- Born: February 17, 1952 Kansas City, Missouri, U.S.
- Died: August 23, 2020 (aged 68) Dalton, Massachusetts, U.S.
- Denomination: Anglican
- Parents: Robert Clair Newton Tarrant, Letitia Marie Church
- Spouse: Patricia Donaldson (m. 1990)
- Children: Jeremy Tarrant

John Thomas Tarrant (February 17, 1952 - August 23, 2020) was an American bishop. He was the tenth bishop of the Episcopal Diocese of South Dakota in The Episcopal Church from 2010 to 2019.

== Life and ministry ==
Tarrant was born in Kansas City, Missouri, on February 17, 1952, to Robert Clair Newton Tarrant (1907-1983) and Letitia Marie "Pat" Church (1920-1983). He graduated from the Michigan State University in 1974 with a Bachelor of Arts degree in political science. After studies at Virginia Theological Seminary, graduating with a Master of Divinity degree in 1983, he was ordained to the diaconate on June 11, 1983, and to the priesthood on February 11, 1984.

Tarrant served as curate of the Church of the Atonement in Westfield, Massachusetts (1983 to 1985), rector of St Paul's Church in Gardner, Massachusetts (1985 to 1989), assistant priest at St Paul's Church in Holyoke, Massachusetts (1989 to 1991), missioner at the Greater Waterbury Episcopal Ministry in Middlebury, Connecticut (1991 to 1996), rector of St Paul's Church in Stockbridge, Massachusetts (1996 to 2005), and rector of Trinity Church in Pierre, South Dakota (2005 to 2009).

In 2009, Tarrant was elected Coadjutor Bishop of South Dakota and was consecrated on October 31, 2009 with Presiding Bishop Katharine Jefferts Schori as chief consecrator. He succeeded as diocesan bishop on February 2, 2010, retiring in 2019. He died from a heart attack on August 23, 2020, in Dalton, Massachusetts.

== See also ==
- List of Episcopal bishops of the United States
- List of bishops of the Episcopal Church in the United States of America
