= Creighton Robertson =

American lawyer

The Right Reverend Creighton Robertson
- Bishop of South Dakota
- Church: Episcopal Church
- Diocese: South Dakota
- Elected: 1994
- In office: 1994–2009
- Predecessor: Craig Anderson
- Successor: John Tarrant

Orders
- Ordination: May 6, 1990 by Craig Anderson
- Consecration: June 19, 1994 by Edmond L. Browning

Personal details
- Born: March 6, 1944 Kansas City, Missouri, United States
- Died: October 24, 2014 (aged 70) Sioux Falls, South Dakota, United States
- Denomination: Anglican
- Parents: Sylvester Robertson, Lena Ortley
- Spouse: Ann Stanage (m. 1967)
- Children: 5

Creighton Leland Robertson (March 6, 1944 - October 24, 2014) was ninth bishop of the Episcopal Diocese of South Dakota from 1994 to 2009.

== Early life and education ==
Robertson was born in Kansas City, Missouri and was a citizen of the Sisseton Wahpeton Oyate. Then Robertson and his family moved to the Lake Traverse Indian Reservation and eventually to Wahpeton, North Dakota where Robertson graduated from high school. He graduated from the North Dakota State College of Science with an associate degree in printing in 1964, followed by a bachelor's degree in History from Black Hills State University in 1971. He went to the University of South Dakota School of Law and graduated in 1976.

== Career ==
Robertson practiced law in Webster, South Dakota. He was the attorney for the Sisseton Wapheton Oyate and a tribal judge. He worked for the South Dakota Department of Labor and served on the South Dakota Human Rights Commission. In 1986, Robertson studied for the Episcopalian ministry at the University of the South and graduated with an M.Div. in 1989.

Robertson was ordained to the diaconate on June 22, 1989, and to the priesthood on May 6, 1990. He was consecrated as a bishop on June 19, 1994, by Edmond L. Browning, Harold S. Jones, and Craig Anderson.
