= Walter H. Jones (bishop) =

Canadian Anglican bishop

The Most Reverend Walter H. Jones
- Metropolitan of Rupert's Land
- Church: Anglican Church of Canada
- Province: Rupert's Land
- Diocese: Rupert's Land
- In office: 1988–1993
- Predecessor: Kent Clarke
- Successor: Barry Curtis
- Other post: Bishop of Rupert's Land (1983-1993)
- Previous post: Bishop of South Dakota (1970-1983)

Orders
- Ordination: June 8, 1952 by Ivor Norris
- Consecration: July 25, 1970 by Gordon V. Smith

Personal details
- Born: December 25, 1928 Saint Boniface, Manitoba, Canada
- Died: March 22, 2003 (aged 74) Winnipeg, Manitoba, Canada
- Buried: Cathedral of St John
- Denomination: Anglican
- Parents: Harry Heath Jones, Anne Grace Stoddart
- Spouse: L. Marilyn Lunney (m. 1951)
- Children: 4
- Education: University of Manitoba

Walter Heath Jones (25 December 1928 – 22 March 2003) was an Anglican bishop in the United States and Canada.

== Early life and education ==
Jones was born in Saint Boniface, Winnipeg, on December 25, 1928, the son of Harry Heath Jones and Anne Grace Stoddart. He graduated with a Bachelor of Arts from the University of Manitoba in 1951, and also a Bachelor of Theology from St John's College in 1951. He was awarded a Doctor of Sacred Theology in 1970. He married L. Marilyn Lunney on August 25, 1951, and together had four children.

== Ordained ministry ==
Jones was ordained deacon on May 20, 1951, and priest on June 8, 1952, at St Matthew's Cathedral in Brandon, Manitoba, by Bishop Ivor Norris. He served as rector of St Peter's Church in Flin Flon between 1951 and 1956, and then rector of St John the Baptist Church in Winnipeg between 1956 and 1958. In 1958, he was received into the Episcopal Church of the United States, and became rector of St Mary's Church in Mitchell, South Dakota. In 1962, he became Canon to the Ordinary of the Missionary District of South Dakota. He also briefly served as at St George's Church in Bismarck, North Dakota. He became Dean of Calvary Cathedral, Sioux Falls in 1968.

=== Bishop ===
In April 1970, he was elected Bishop of South Dakota, and was consecrated on July 25, 1970. In 1971, when the missionary district became a diocese, Jones became the first diocesan bishop of South Dakota. He resigned in March 1983 and returned to Canada where he became the Bishop of Rupert's Land, and then Archbishop and Metropolitan of Rupert's Land in 1987. He retired in 1993 and died in 2003.

Anglican Communion titles
Preceded by Conrad H. Gesner	Bishop of South Dakota; 1970–1983	Succeeded by Craig Anderson
Preceded by Barry Valentine	Bishop of Rupert's Land; 1983–1993	Succeeded by Patrick Lee
Preceded by Kent Clarke	Metropolitan of Rupert's Land; 1988–1993	Succeeded by Barry Curtis
