= Lula Owl Gloyne =

Nurse

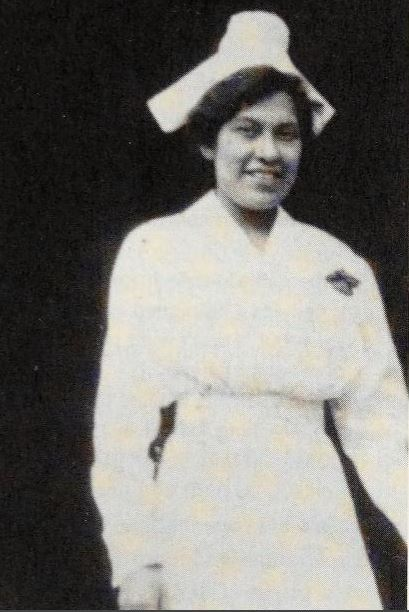
- Lula Owl in 1917
- Born: December 27, 1891; North Carolina
- Died: April 17, 1985 (aged 93); Swain County
- Other names: Lula Owl
- Occupation: Nurse

Louisiana Leta "Lula" Owl Gloyne (née Louisiana Leta Owl; December 27, 1891 – April 17, 1985) was a Native American nurse. She was the first member of the Eastern Band of Cherokee Indians and perhaps the first Native American to become a registered nurse. She was the only Eastern Cherokee to serve as an officer in World War I.

== Early life and education ==
She was born Louisiana Leta Owl on December 27, 1891 in North Carolina, the eldest of ten children of Daniel Lloyd Owl, a Cherokee blacksmith, and Nettie Harris Owl, a Catawba traditional potter. Her parents did not speak each other's tribal languages, so English was the language of the household. Her mother encouraged education, telling them "You must go to school so you can have the kinds of things white people have." Lula Owl and six of her surviving siblings all obtained professional careers. Her brother was Henry Owl.

Lula Owl attended Cherokee Boarding School on the Qualla Boundary, and in 1907 she began at the Hampton Institute in Virginia. Though founded as a school for African-Americans, from 1878 to 1923 over one thousand Native American students attended Hampton, including Owl and her siblings. Lula Owl graduated in 1914, then spent a year teaching Catawba children in Rock Hill, South Carolina.

Owl attended the Chestnut Hill Hospital School of Nursing in Philadelphia, graduating in 1916. She spent two years as the nurse of St. Elizabeth's Episcopal School on the Standing Rock Indian Reservation.

During World War I, Owl joined the Army Nurse Corps. Her seasickness prevented the journey to Europe to serve there as a field nurse, so instead she served at Camp Lewis in Washington as a second lieutenant and thereby became the only Eastern Cherokee to serve as an officer in World War I. She was also the first Cherokee to hold a position in healthcare on Qualla Boundary.

After World War I, Gloyne worked as a nurse at the Bureau of Indian Affairs in Oklahoma.

Gloyne had four children, including two daughters. One daughter, Mollie Blankenship, was elected to the Cherokee tribal council, while the other daughter, Mary Gloyne Byler, is a writer and educator.

== Later life ==
When she was 84 years old, Gloyne started bowling, which is described in a 1981 remembrance written by Kays Gary, a reporter for The Charlotte Observer. She died on 17 April 1985.

== Awards and honors ==
Gloyne was nominated for the Distinguished Women of North Carolina award in 1985,and the Cherokee Tribe named her a "Beloved Woman", as of 2012 only three women have been bestowed this honor. She was inducted into the North Carolina Nurse’s Hall of Fame in 2015.
