= George Emlen Hare =

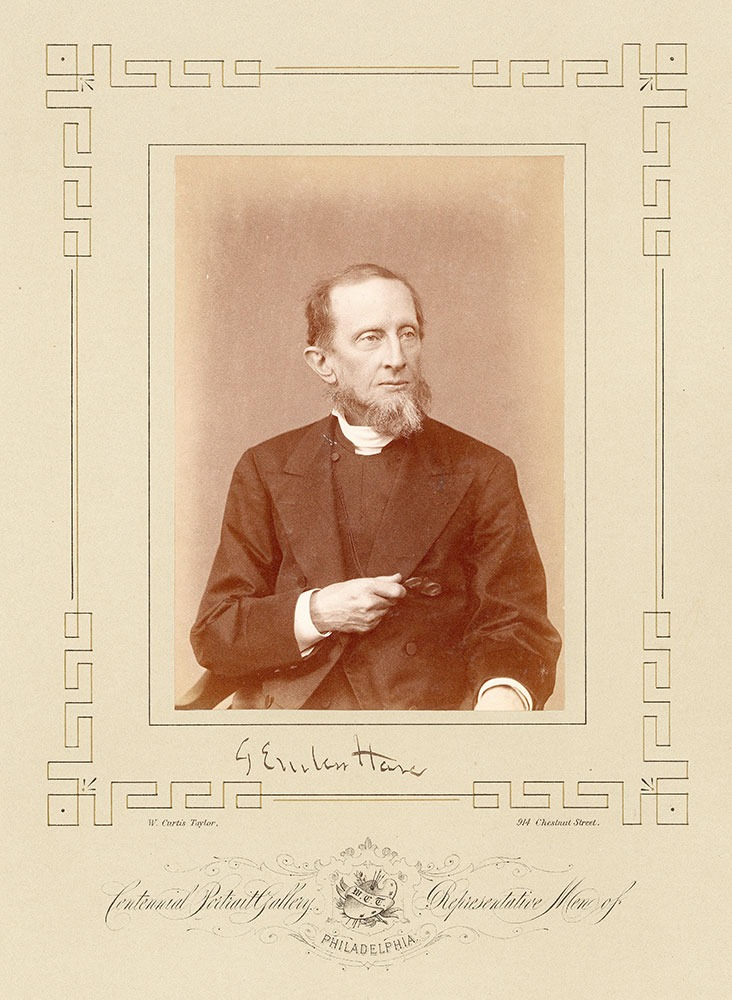
- Born: 4 September 1808; Philadelphia
- Died: 15 February 1892 (aged 83); Philadelphia
- Alma mater: Union College; Dickinson College; General Theological Seminary
- Spouse(s): Elizabeth Catherine Hobart
- Children: William Hobart Hare
- Parent(s): Charles Willing Hare; Anne Emlen Hare

George Emlen Hare (1808–1892) was an American Episcopal clergyman, born in Philadelphia.

He graduated at Union College in 1826, was rector of St. John's, Carlisle, Pennsylvania (1830–34), of Trinity Church, Princeton, New Jersey, (1834–43), and of St. Matthew's Church, Francisville, Philadelphia (1845–52). In 1844–45 he was a professor of Latin and Greek at the University of Pennsylvania. He had had charge of the Episcopal Academy during a part of his pastorate at St. Matthew's. He was made instructor in the diocesan training school and, after its development into the Philadelphia Divinity School, a professor of biblical learning. From 1881 he was Professor of New Testament literature. He wrote Christ to Return (1840) and a volume of sermons, Visions and Narratives of the Old Testament (1889).

== Personal and family life ==
Hare married Elizabeth Catherine Hobart, daughter of the Bishop John Henry Hobart, at St. John's Chapel, New York, New York.
