= Gladys Cardiff =

American poet

- Born: 1942 (age 83–84); Browning, Montana, United States
- Education: University of Washington (MFA), Western Michigan University (PhD)
- Occupations: Poet, academic
- Notable work: To Frighten a Storm, A Bare Unpainted Table
- Father: Henry Owl
- Awards: Washington State Governor's Award, Louisa Kerns Award

Gladys Cardiff (born 1942) is an Eastern Band Cherokee poet and academic, with interests in Native American, African-American and American literature. She was an associate professor at Oakland University from 1999 to 2013.

== Early life ==
Cardiff was born in Browning, Montana. Her father was Henry Owl of the Owl clan, who is listed on the Baker Roll as having a Cherokee blood quantum of half, and having a Catawba mother. She is of Irish and Welsh descent on her mother's side. She is a citizen of the Eastern Band of Cherokee Indians. She makes use of her cultural heritage in her work, referencing especially Cherokee place names in her poetry.

She attended the University of Washington, where she studied with Theodore Roethke. She has a PhD in literature from Western Michigan University.

== Published works ==
Cardiff won the 1976 Washington State Governor's Award for her first book of poetry, To Frighten a Storm. She published A Bare Unpainted Table in 1999. She received awards from the Seattle Arts Commission in 1985 and 1986. "In 1988 she was a co-recipient of the University of Washington's Louisa Kerns Award for literary endeavors." Her poetry has been featured by The Poetry Foundation.
