= St. Andrew's Episcopal Church (Scotland, South Dakota) =

Historic church in South Dakota, United States

- U.S. National Register of Historic Places
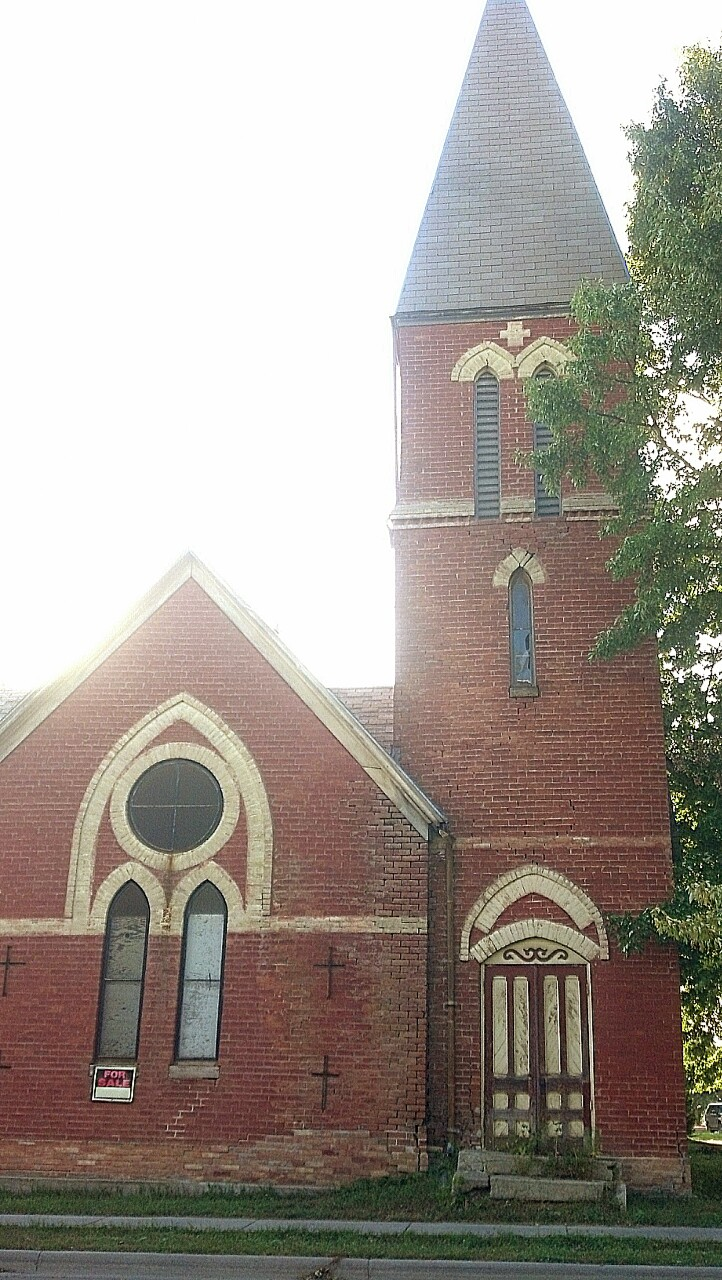

- Location within South Dakota Location within the United States
- Location: 4th and Poplar Sts. Scotland, South Dakota
- Coordinates: 43.1505°N 97.7164°W
- Built: 1886
- Architectural style: Gothic Revival
- NRHP reference No.: 82003912
- Added to NRHP: June 17, 1982

St. Andrew's Episcopal Church is a historic Episcopal church building in Scotland, South Dakota, in the United States. The brick Gothic Revival style building was built in 1886, and was added to the National Register of Historic Places on June 17, 1982.

St. Andrew's is no longer an active parish in the Episcopal Diocese of South Dakota. In 2001, Preserve South Dakota, headquartered only a few blocks away at 351 4th Street in Scotland, placed it on its list of threatened historic properties in South Dakota. Its current status according to Preserve South Dakota is threatened with the notation: "building is privately owned, vacant with broken windows and roof leaks."
