= Hugh L. Burleson =

American bishop

The Right Reverend Hugh L. Burleson
- Bishop of South Dakota
- Burleson in 1924
- Church: Episcopal Church
- Diocese: South Dakota
- Elected: October 25, 1916
- In office: 1916–1931
- Predecessor: George Biller Jr.
- Successor: W. Blair Roberts

Orders
- Ordination: 1894 by William Paret
- Consecration: December 14, 1916 by Daniel S. Tuttle

Personal details
- Born: April 25, 1865 Northfield, Minnesota, United States
- Died: August 1, 1933 (aged 68) Custer, South Dakota, United States
- Buried: Woodlawn Cemetery, Sioux Falls, South Dakota
- Denomination: Anglican
- Parents: Solomon Stevens Burleson, Abigail Pomeroy
- Spouse: Helen S. Ely (m. 1894)
- Education: Racine College

Hugh Latimer Burleson (April 25, 1865 – August 1, 1933) was bishop of the Diocese of South Dakota in the Episcopal Church in the United States from 1916 to 1931.

== Early life and education ==
Burleson was born on April 25, 1865, in Northfield, Minnesota, the son of the Reverend Solomon Stevens Burleson, who was also a lawyer, and Abigail Pomeroy. He received his preliminary education at the Racine Grammar School, before studying at Racine College and graduating with a Bachelor of Arts in 1887 and a Master of Arts in 1889. While attending college he operated a printing press in Racine in association with his brothers, and after graduation in 1887 taught at Kemper Hall in Davenport, Iowa. Later, he also graduated from the General Theological Seminary in New York City with a Bachelor of Divinity in 1893.

== Ordained ministry ==
Burleson was ordained deacon by Bishop Charles Chapman Grafton of Fond du Lac on June 24, 1893, and priest in 1894 by Bishop William Paret of Maryland. He served as curate at the Church of the Holy Communion in New York City from 1893 to 1894, and then as rector of St. Mark's Church in Waupaca, Wisconsin from 1894 to 1898. From 1898 to 1900 he was assistant at St. Luke's Church in Rochester, New York, while in 1900 he was elected dean of Gethsemane Cathedral in Fargo, North Dakota. While in Fargo, he started the North Dakota Sheaf, the first Episcopal Church publication in North Dakota, and was active in both York Rite and Scottish Rite Masonry. From 1909 to 1916, Burleson was editorial secretary of the Episcopal Board of Missions and editor of the Spirit of Missions in New York City.

=== Bishop ===
On October 25, 1916, Burleson was elected Missionary Bishop of South Dakota, and was consecrated on December 14, 1916 with Presiding Bishop Daniel S. Tuttle as chief consecrator. He retained the bishopric until his resignation on September 28, 1931, to serve as the assistant of the presiding bishop. He died on August 1, 1933, in Custer, South Dakota.
