= Gall (Native American leader) =

19th century Lakota chief

- Phizí
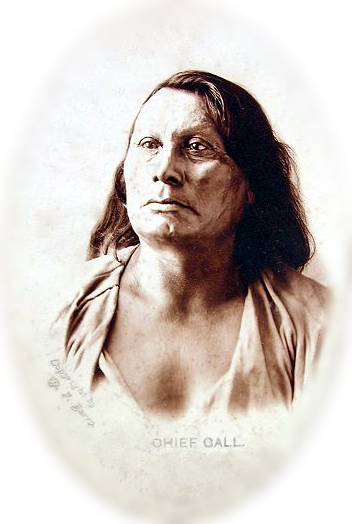

Hunkpapa Lakota battle leader

Personal details
- Born: c. 1840 South Dakota
- Died: December 5, 1894 (aged 54) Wakpala, South Dakota
- Resting place: Wakpala, South Dakota

Military service
- Battles/wars: Battle of the Little Bighorn

Gall (c. 1840 – December 5, 1894), Lakota Phizí, was an important military leader of the Hunkpapa Lakota in the Battle of the Little Bighorn. He spent four years in exile in Canada with Sitting Bull's people, after the wars ended and surrendered in 1881 to live on the Standing Rock Sioux Reservation. He would eventually advocate for the assimilation of his people to reservation life and served as a tribal judge in his later years.

== Early years ==
Born in present-day South Dakota around 1840, and orphaned, Gall was said to receive his name after eating the gallbladder of an animal killed by a neighbor, without flinching at the vile taste of the bile.

An accomplished warrior by his late teens, Gall became a war chief in his twenties. As a Lakota war leader in the long conflict against United States intrusion onto tribal lands, Gall served with Sitting Bull during several battles, including the Battle of Killdeer Mountain in 1864 and the Battle of the Little Bighorn in 1876.

== Battle of the Little Bighorn ==
Since the early 1980s, archaeological researchers have conducted battlefield excavations following a major grass fire. Historians have also studied accounts by participating Native Americans and tribal oral histories. Based on these elements, a contemporary reassessment of the Battle of the Little Bighorn has given Gall greater credit for several crucial tactical decisions that contributed to the Sioux and Cheyenne's overpowering defeat of the five companies of cavalry led by Custer of the 7th Cavalry.

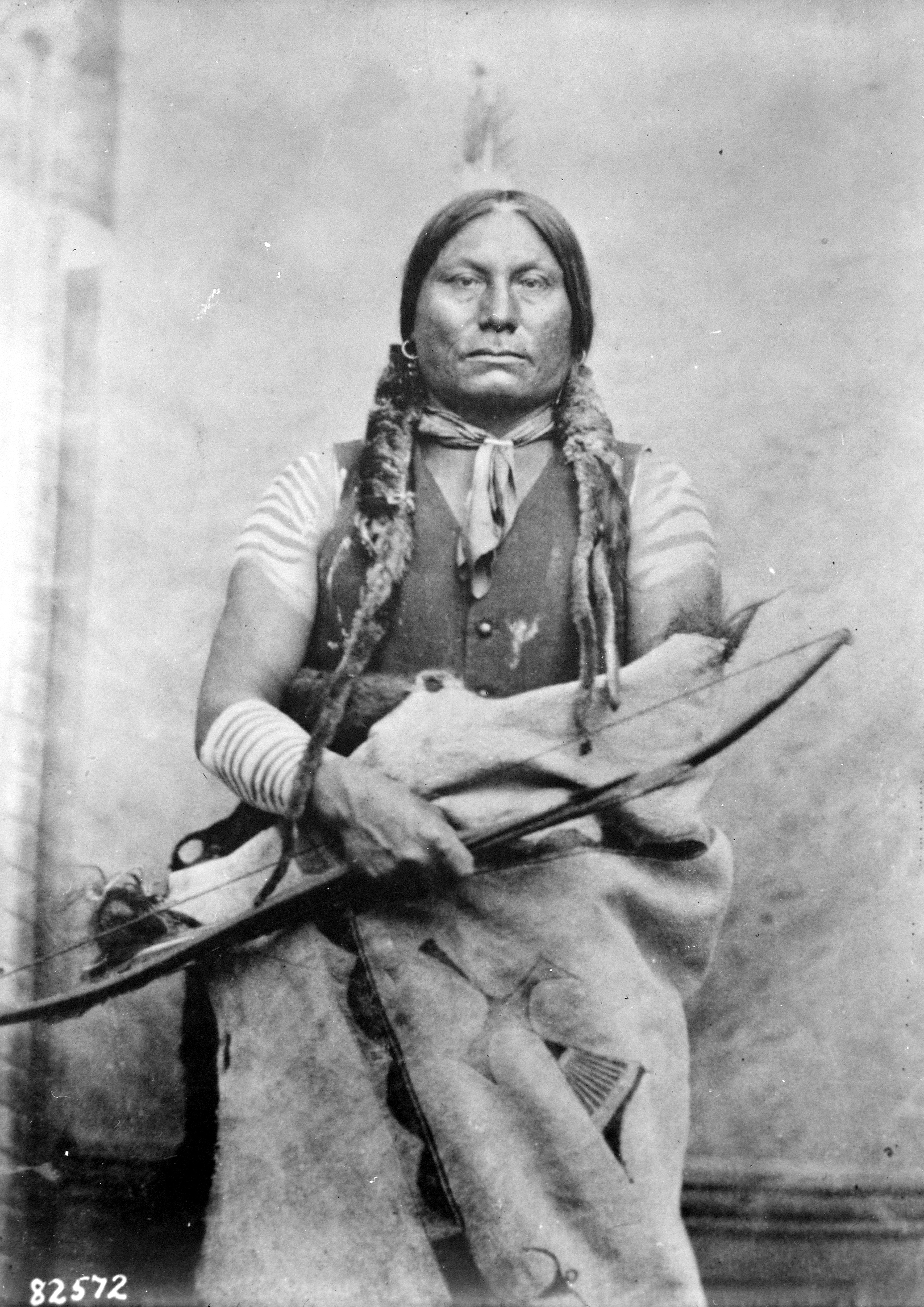
Gall, Photographed by David Francis Barry at Fort Buford, North Dakota, 1881.

Major Marcus Reno's initial attack on the southeast end of the Native American village killed Gall's two wives and several children. Gall described it: "My heart was very bad that day." During the opening phase of the battle, the Lakota and Cheyenne repulsed Reno's three companies of cavalry from the southeastern end of their large village. Gall was one of the few Native Americans to suspect that Custer's strategy was probably a two-pronged attack. He believed that determining the location of the other half of Custer's attacking force was critical to Native American defense.

Gall crossed the river and rode to the northeast, where he spied Custer's chief scout, Mitch Bouyer, returning to Custer from surveilling the Native American village. After locating the main element of Custer's five companies, Gall correctly determined that they probably intended to force a river crossing and an entrance into the northern end of the village. Riding back down from the bluffs, Gall told Sioux and Cheyenne forces returning from Reno's repulse of his suspicions. With Crazy Horse, he led forces north across the river to drive Company E and F due north up present-day Calhoun Couley to present-day Finley Ridge. There they forced three of Custer's companies to fight a largely defensive battle.

Within minutes, Gall and his forces took a position northeast of Finley Ridge and poured a withering fire down on Companies C, I and L. When Crazy Horse charged through an opening between Lt. Calhoun's Company L and Company I in a surprise right envelopment attack, Company L probably began to pull back off the ridge to try to link up with Company I. Companies C and L tried to redeploy to the east and others moved to the south.

Seeing that the two cavalry companies no longer had the fire superiority that held the Native Americans at bay, Gall and his men attacked from the east as the other Indians attacked the cut-off elements of Company C from both the east and the south. They soon finished off Companies C and L, and forced survivors and some of Company I to flee towards Custer and his men north of the so-called "Last Stand Hill." A few of the soldiers of Companies C, I and L also fled south toward the river. The places where they fell were later marked by white marble monuments, which still stand.

Soon the combined native forces finished off Custer and his men. The last approximately 28 survivors made a dash south for the river. They were trapped in the box canyon called "Deep Ravine". After killing them, the Indians had completely annihilated Custer's five companies.

In later years, Gall recounted his role in the battle. He had mistakenly thought the survivors of Custer's three southeastern companies fled northwest to Custer because they ran out of ammunition. The horse soldiers may also have fled after losing their will to fight, as many men simply ran, even abandoning loaded rifles. The Sioux and Cheyenne picked these up and fired the weapons to drive off the soldiers' horses, thus depriving them of a key tactical mobility advantage. The native warriors attacking Greasy Grass Ridge from the southeast came mostly on foot. Gall kept up enfilading fire from the northeast.

== Later years ==
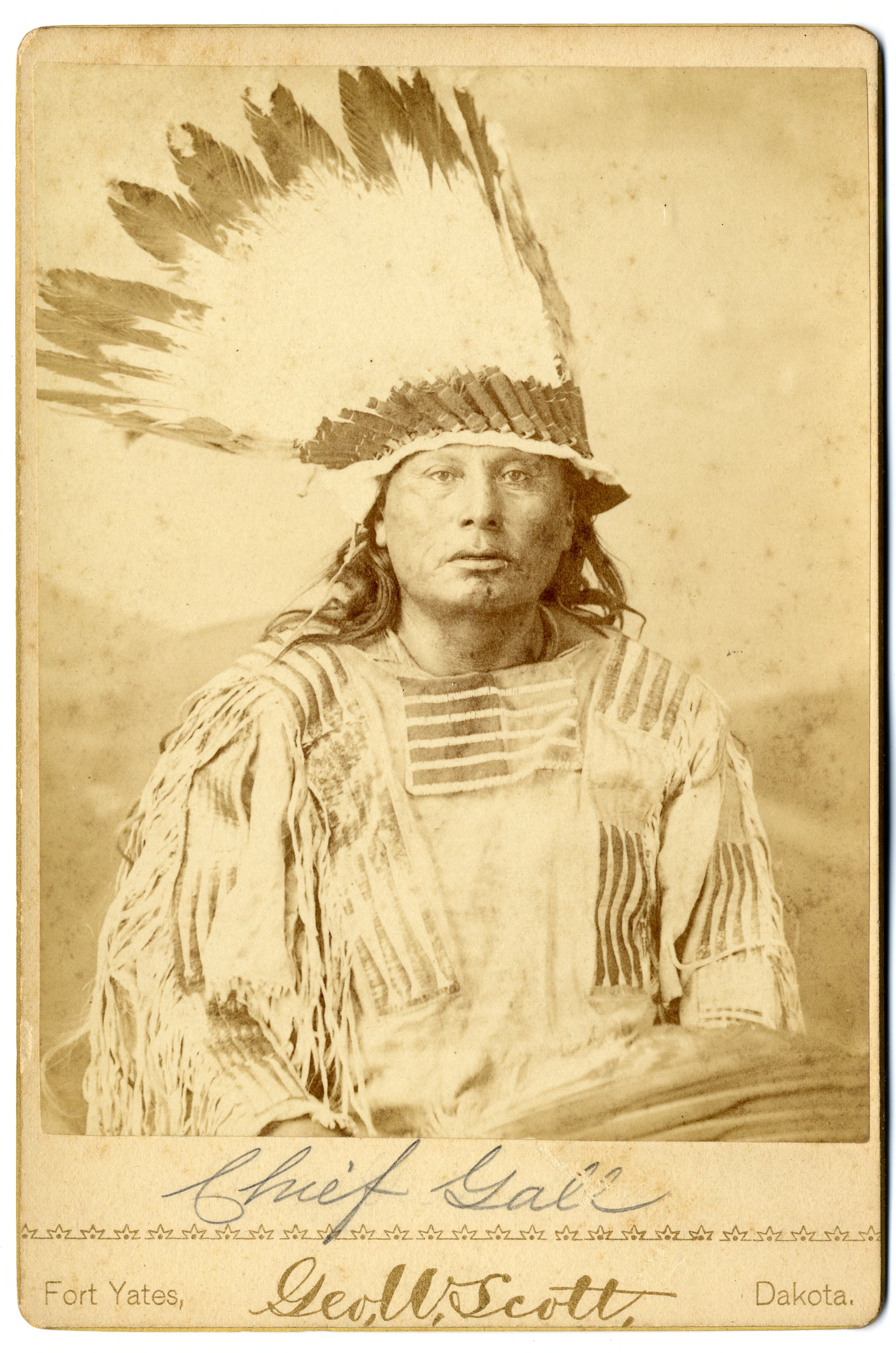
Gall, circa 1880s

In late 1876, many of the Hunkpapa bands crossed over the border into Canada, where they struggled to survive for the next several years. Gall came to disagree with Sitting Bull and brought his band back to the United States, surrendering at Fort Buford, Dakota Territory, on January 3, 1881. On May 26, 1881, he and his followers were loaded onto steamers (along with Crow King, Black Moon, Low Dog and Fools Heart) and shipped downriver to the Standing Rock Indian Reservation. The first complete census of the Lakota at Standing Rock, taken in the fall of 1881, listed Gall with a band of 52 families, totaling 230 people.

Becoming a farmer, Gall encouraged his people to adapt to reservation life. He also converted to Christianity, took the additional name Abraham, and served as a judge on the reservation's Court of Indian Affairs. He became friendly with the Indian Agent, James McLaughlin. The 1885 reservation census listed Gall as responsible for 22 lodges and 114 people.

== Death ==
Gall lived on the Standing Rock Agency until his death at his Oak Creek home on December 5, 1894. He is buried in Saint Elizabeth Episcopal Cemetery in Wakpala, South Dakota. In 1991, his remains were exhumed because the Utah Field House of Natural History State Park Museum purported to have his skull, but his remains were found intact.
