= Frederick Foote Johnson =

American bishop

The Right Reverend Frederick Foote Johnson
- Bishop of Missouri
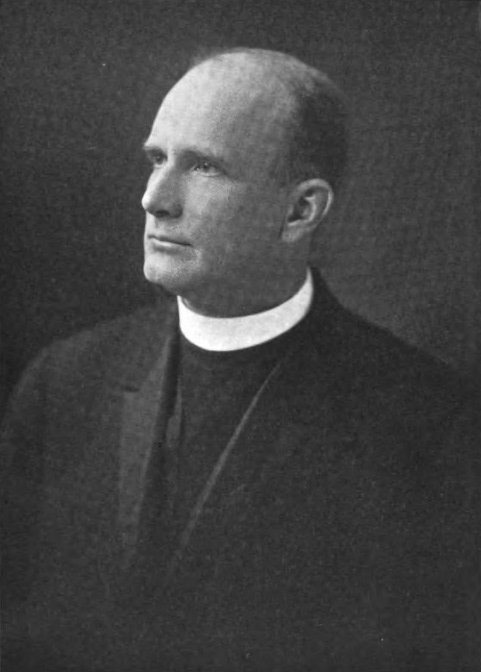
- Church: Episcopal Church
- Diocese: Missouri
- In office: 1923–1933
- Predecessor: Daniel S. Tuttle
- Successor: William Scarlett
- Previous posts: Assistant Bishop of South Dakoda (1905-1910); Missionary Bishop of South Dakoda (1910-1911); Coadjutor Bishop of Missouri (1911-1923)

Orders
- Ordination: October 15, 1897 by John Franklin Spalding
- Consecration: November 2, 1905 by Daniel S. Tuttle

Personal details
- Born: April 23, 1866 Newton, Connecticut, United States
- Died: May 9, 1943 (aged 77) Newton, Connecticut, United States
- Buried: Newtown Village Cemetery, Newton, Connecticut
- Denomination: Anglican
- Parents: Ezra Levan Johnson, Jane Eliza Camp
- Spouse: Susan Lynn Beers (m. 1899) Elizabeth L. Beers (m. 1915)
- Children: 1

Frederick Foote Johnson (April 23, 1866 – May 9, 1943) was fourth bishop of the Episcopal Diocese of Missouri.

== Early life and education ==
Johnson was born in Newtown, Connecticut on April 23, 1866, a son of Ezra Levan Johnson (1822-1914) and Jane Eliza Camp (1837-1922). He was a descendant of Nathaniel Foote. Johnson was educated at Newtown High School, St Stephen's College in Annandale, New York and the Cheshire Episcopal School. He then attended Trinity College from where he earned a Bachelor of Arts in 1894, a Master of Arts in 1897, and a Doctor of Divinity in 1906. He also studied at Berkeley Divinity School, graduated with a Bachelor of Divinity in 1897, and was awarded a Doctor of Divinity in 1906. The University of the South also awarded him an honorary Doctor of Divinity in 1918.

== Ordained ministry ==
Johnson was ordained deacon on November 11, 1896, by Bishop John Hazen White of Indiana, and then priest on October 15, 1897, by Bishop John Franklin Spalding in Denver, Colorado. He served as minister at St Barnabas' Church in Glenwood Springs, Colorado in 1897 and then as curate at St Stephen's Church in Colorado Springs, Colorado from 1897 till 1898. In 1898 he also briefly served as rector at Boulder, Colorado, before becoming rector of Trinity Church in Redlands, California in 1899. Between 1904 and 1905, he was a diocesan missionary in Western Massachusetts.

=== Bishop ===
On June 8, 1905, Johnson was elected Assistant Bishop of South Dakoda, and was consecrated on November 2, 1905 with Presiding Bishop Daniel S. Tuttle as chief consecrator. He was elected Missionary Bishop of South Dakota on October 11, 1910. A year later, in May 1911, he was elected Coadjutor Bishop of Missouri, and succeeded as diocesan bishop in 1923. He retired in 1933 and died 10 years later on May 9, 1943.
