= William Hobart Hare =

American bishop

Rt. Rev. William Hobart Hare
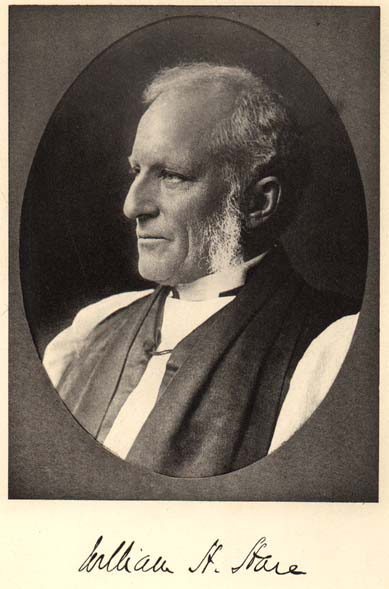
- Born: May 17, 1838; Princeton, New Jersey, US
- Died: October 23, 1909 (aged 71); Atlantic City, New Jersey, US
- Church: Episcopal Church (United States)

William Hobart Hare (May 17, 1838 – October 23, 1909) was an American bishop of the Protestant Episcopal Church.

== Early life ==
Son of the Rev. George Emlen Hare (1808-1892) and Elizabeth Catherine Hobart (1810-1883), William Hobart Hare was born at Princeton, New Jersey, and educated at the University of Pennsylvania, although he never graduated nor attended seminary before his ordination as a deacon in 1859 and as a priest in 1862.

== Career ==
He preached in Philadelphia at St. Luke's Episcopal Church and St. Paul's Episcopal Church in the Chestnut Hill neighborhood until 1863, when he moved to Minnesota, hoping the climate change would help his wife's heath. However, he returned to Philadelphia to take a position at the Church of the Ascension, then for three years, Hare served as the general agent of the foreign committee of the Board of Missions. In 1872 he was elected Missionary Bishop of Niobrara, named after the Niobrara River in Nebraska. In 1883 that diocese was split, and Bp. Hare's part was extended to include the State of South Dakota. He wrote several pamphlets on missionary work in the West.

One of the leading missionaries in America, Hare was called "the Apostle of the West" for his dedicated work in the rural Dakotas among pioneers and Native Americans.

When Hare learned about General Philip Sheridan's plan to march into the Black Hills in 1874, territory reserved for the Sioux by the 1868 Treaty of Fort Laramie, Hare appealed directly to President Ulysses S. Grant that the operation be canceled.

== Death and legacy ==
Calvary Cathedral gravesite

Hare died in Atlantic City, New Jersey. His body was returned to South Dakota for burial outside his diocese's cathedral; it was briefly reinterred at the school, and then returned to the cathedral lawn.

== See also ==
- Episcopal Diocese of South Dakota

== Publications ==
- M. A. De W. Howe, Jr., The Life and Labors of Bishop Hare, Apostle to the Sioux (New York, 1911)
