= Wakpala, South Dakota =

- Unincorporated community
- Location within South Dakota Location within the United States
- Coordinates: 45°39′34″N 100°32′08″W
- Country: United States
- State: South Dakota
- County: Corson

Area
  - Total: 0.44 sq mi (1.13 km^{2})
  - Land: 0.44 sq mi (1.13 km^{2})
  - Water: 0 sq mi (0.00 km^{2})
- Elevation: 1,637 ft (499 m)

Population (2020)
  - Total: 267
  - Density: 609.5/sq mi (235.33/km^{2})
- Time zone: UTC-7 (Mountain (MST))
  - Summer (DST): UTC-6 (MDT)
- ZIP code: 57658
- Area code: 605
- FIPS code: 46-68180
- GNIS feature ID: 2813013

Wakpala is an unincorporated community in Corson County, South Dakota, United States, on the west side of the Missouri River, north-northwest of Mobridge. Wakpala is within the boundaries of the Standing Rock Sioux Reservation, and its name loosely translates to "creek" in the Lakota language, with Oak Creek running south on its eastern edge.

As of the 2020 census, Wakpala had a population of 267.

Chief Gall (Piji, Phizí) is buried at Saint Elizabeth Episcopal Cemetery here and Chief Sitting Bull (Tȟatȟáŋka Íyotake) is possibly buried under a concrete bust bearing his name a few miles south of town in the Mobridge area. Sitting Bull was originally buried at Fort Yates, North Dakota, but an effort was made to exhume his bones and rebury him at the present site.

The annual Wakpala Wacipi (dance or powwow) is held on the last weekend in August.

== Demographics ==
Historical population
Census	Pop.	Note	%±
2020	267		—
U.S. Decennial Census
