= Calvary Cathedral (Sioux Falls, South Dakota) =

- Calvary Cathedral Church
- Calvary Cathedral
- Calvary Cathedral
- 43°32′31.85″N 96°43′40.04″W
- Location: 500 S. Main Ave. Sioux Falls, South Dakota
- Country: United States
- Denomination: Episcopal Church
- Website: www.calvarycathedral.net

History
- Status: Cathedral
- Founded: 1872
- Consecrated: December 18, 1889

Architecture
- Functional status: Active
- Style: Gothic Revival
- Completed: 1889

Administration
- Diocese: South Dakota

Clergy
- Bishop: Jonathan H. Folts
- Dean: Ward H. Simpson

Calvary Cathedral is an Episcopal cathedral in Sioux Falls, South Dakota, United States. It is the seat of the Diocese of South Dakota. The cathedral reported 880 members in 2019 and 452 members in 2025. Plate and pledge income for the congregation in 2025 was $336,567 with average Sunday attendance (ASA) of 118. This was a relative decrease from ASA of 163 persons reported in 2017.

== History ==
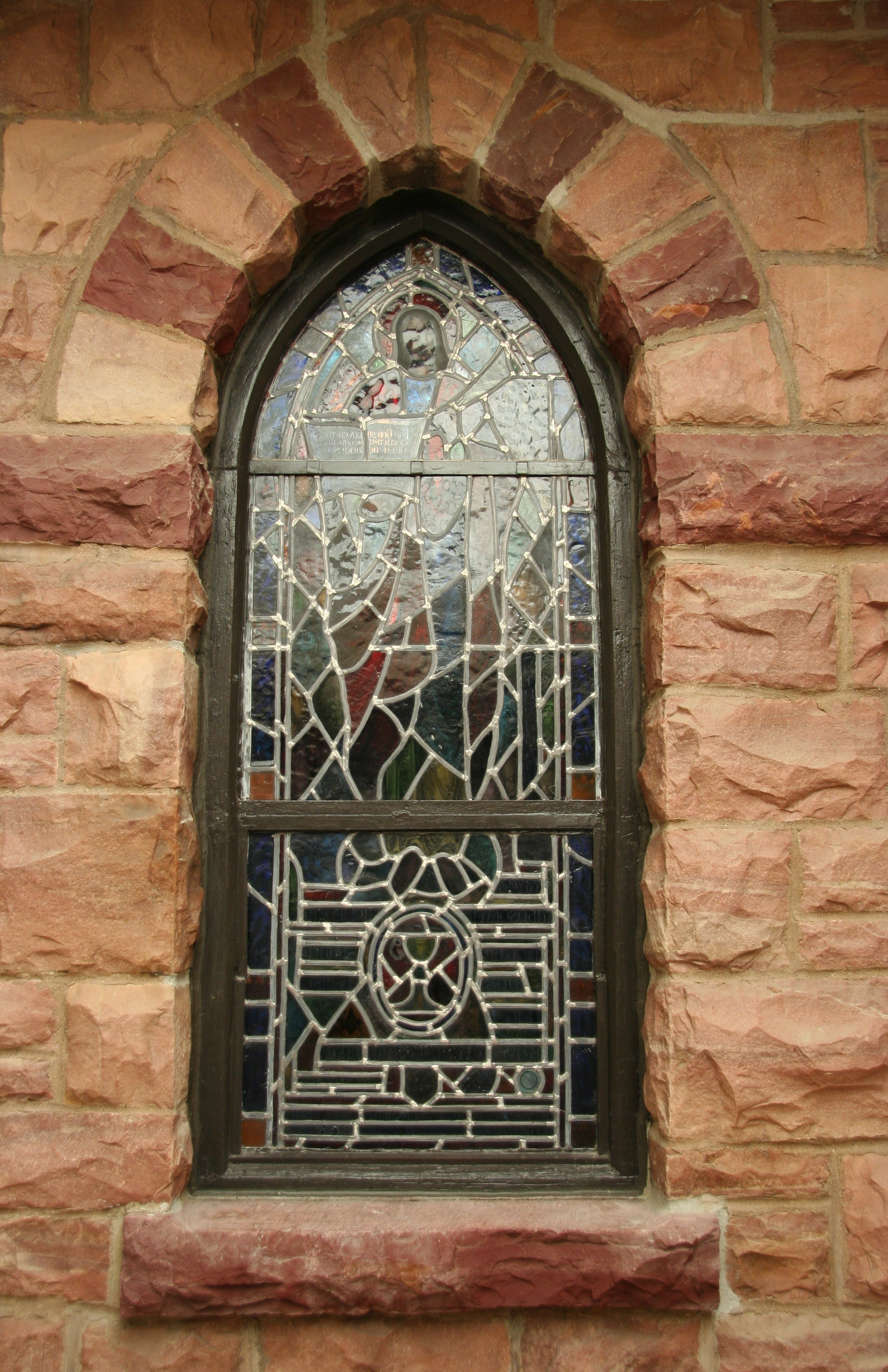
One of the stained glass windows

Calvary Church was established in the spring of 1872. Services in the newly built church building were held on August 11 of the same year. Built on the corner of Main Avenue and Ninth Street, it was the first church building constructed in the city of Sioux Falls. The Rev. W.H. Ross was placed in charge. The lots the church was built on were sold in the summer of 1882 and the building was moved to the corner of Spring Avenue and Tenth Street where the parish had purchased four lots. Four years later an addition was built for Sunday School and guild activities.

John Jacob Astor III contacted the Rt. Rev. William Hobart Hare of the Missionary District of South Dakota shortly after his wife died. She had made financial contributions for several church projects in South Dakota and Astor wanted to build a memorial church in her memory. Hare and Astor decided to build a new cathedral in Sioux Falls and Astor gave a gift of $21,000 for the project. He also gave two more financial gifts that totaled a further $5,000. The cornerstone for the present cathedral was laid on December 5, 1888 and the church was completed the following autumn. It was consecrated on December 18, 1889 as St. Augusta's Church after Astor's late wife, Charlotte Augusta. On September 13, 1890 the two lots on which the church was built were transferred to the Chapter of Calvary Cathedral. The church was renamed St. Augusta's Cathedral on February 28, 1890. It has subsequently reverted to the Calvary name.

== See also ==
- List of the Episcopal cathedrals of the United States
- List of cathedrals in the United States
