= Santee Sioux Reservation =

Coordinates: 42°43′35″N 97°49′49″W

Santee Sioux Reservation Isáŋyathi (Dakota)
- Indian reservation
- Seal

- Location in Nebraska
- Tribe: Santee Sioux Nation
- Country: United States
- State: Nebraska
- County: Knox
- Headquarters: Santee

Government
  - Body: Tribal Council
  - Chairman: Alonzo Denney
  - Vice-Chairman: Kameron Runnels

Area
  - Total: 172.99 sq mi (448.0 km^{2})

Population (2017)
  - Total: 1,041
  - Density: 6.018/sq mi (2.323/km^{2})
- Website: santeesiouxnation.net

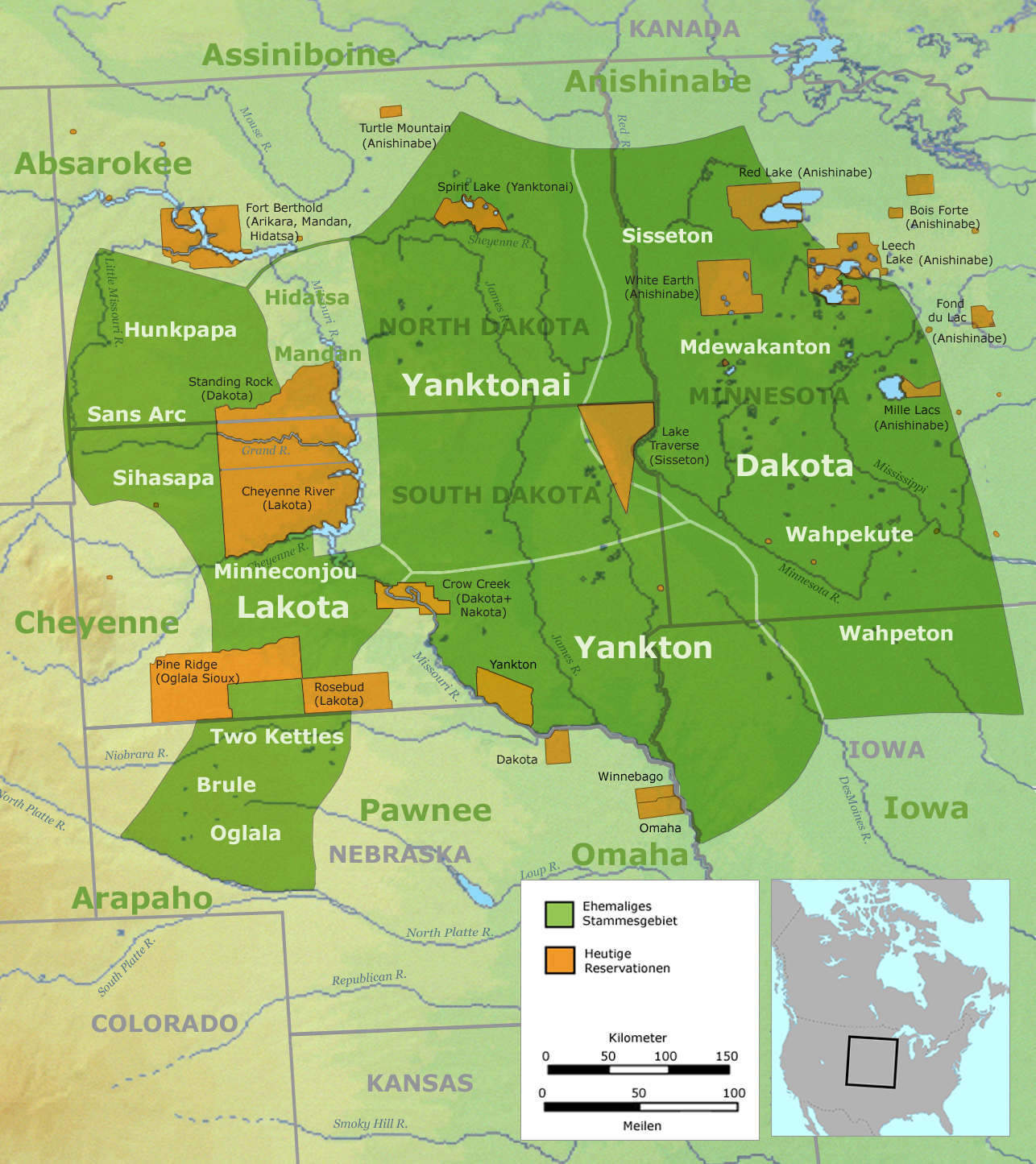
Traditional location of Sioux tribes prior to 1770 (dark green) and their current reservations (orange).

The Santee Sioux Reservation (Dakota: Isáŋyathi) of the Santee Sioux (also known as the Eastern Dakota) was established in 1863 in present-day Nebraska. The tribal seat of government is located in Santee, Nebraska, with reservation lands in Knox County.

== History ==
Established by an Act of the U.S. Congress on March 3, 1863, the Santee Reservation was officially recognized in an Executive Order dated February 27, 1866, and in treaties dated November 16, 1867 and April 29, 1868. Additional executive orders applying to the reservation were dated August 31, 1869, December 31, 1873, and February 9, 1885. In those initial years, tribal members selected 32,875.75 acres (133.0434 km^{2}) as homesteads and 38,908.01 acres (157.4551 km^{2}) as allotments; 1,130.70 acres (4.5758 km^{2}) were designated for use as an Indian agency, school, and mission.

The reservation (shown as Dakota Reservation on the map at right) lies along the south bank of the Missouri River, and includes part of Lewis and Clark Lake. As of the 2000 census, the reservation recorded a resident population of 878, of which 64.1% were Native American and 33.7% White. Its land area is 172.99 mi.² (447.84 km^{2}). The major center of population is the village of Santee, in the northernmost portion of the reservation.

Other major populations of Oglala Lakota and Brulé Sioux are located to the north on reservations within South Dakota.

== Government ==
Chief Wabasha was the first and last head chief of the Santee Sioux until his death in 1876. The first tribal council election was held on January 22, 1878, following a unanimous vote to end the old chief system.

== Communities ==
- Lindy
- Santee

== See also ==
- Native American tribes in Nebraska
- Sioux
- Wabasha III, head chief of Santee Sioux
- John Trudell, activist, poet, actor, and musician whose father was Santee Dakota and who grew up near the Santee Sioux Reservation
