= Santee, Nebraska =

- Village
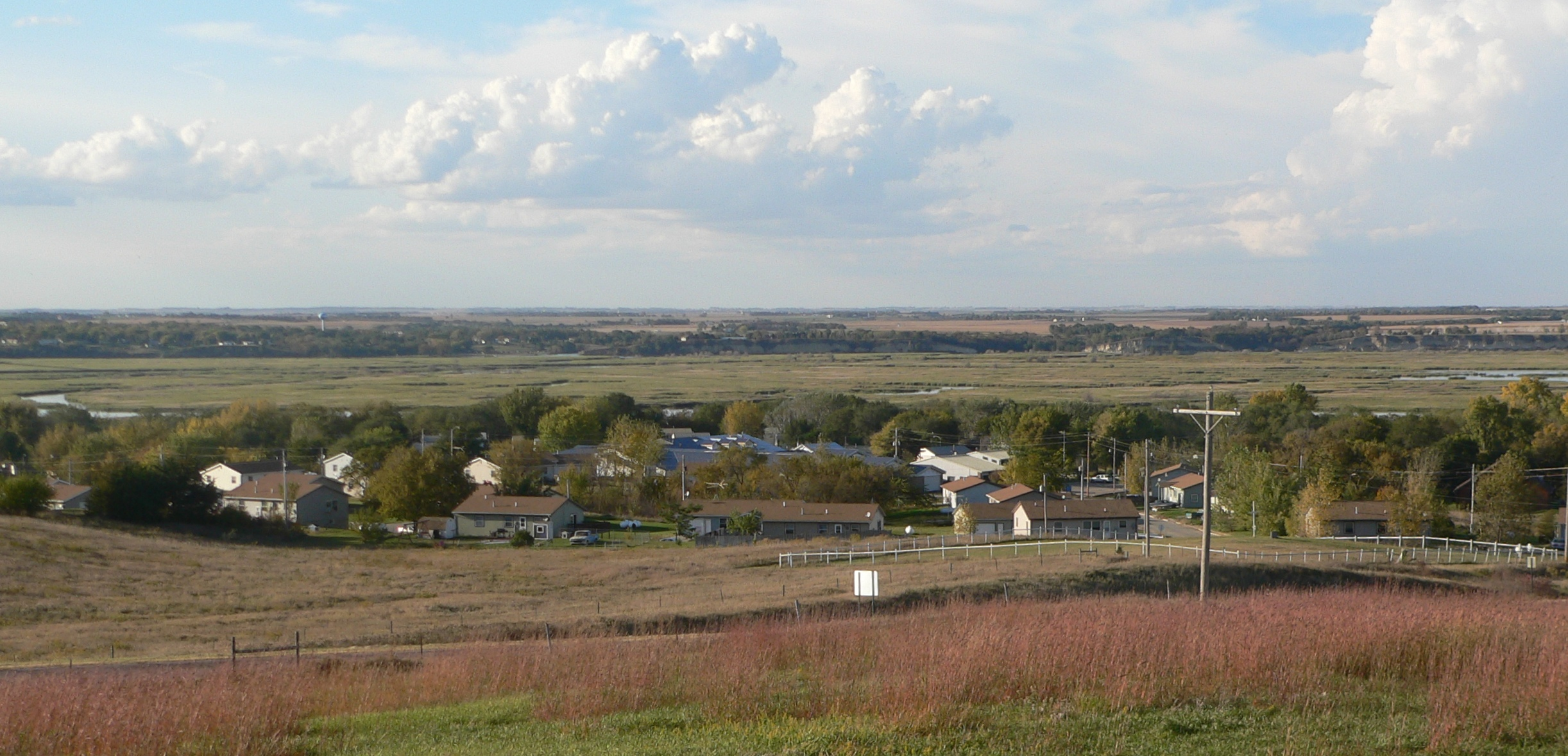
- Santee, seen from the cemetery hill south of town

- Location of Santee, Nebraska
- Coordinates: 42°50′19″N 97°50′58″W
- Country: United States
- State: Nebraska
- County: Knox

Area
  - Total: 0.56 sq mi (1.46 km^{2})
  - Land: 0.56 sq mi (1.46 km^{2})
  - Water: 0 sq mi (0.00 km^{2})
- Elevation: 1,247 ft (380 m)

Population (2020)
  - Total: 424
  - Density: 751.3/sq mi (290.09/km^{2})
- Time zone: UTC-6 (Central (CST))
  - Summer (DST): UTC-5 (CDT)
- ZIP code: 68760
- Area codes: 402 and 531
- FIPS code: 31-43475
- GNIS feature ID: 2399182

Santee is the principal village of the Santee Sioux Reservation in Knox County, Nebraska, United States. As of the 2020 census, Santee had a population of 424.

== History ==
The village was named for the Santee Sioux Indians.

== Geography ==
According to the United States Census Bureau, the village has a total area of 0.56 square miles (1.45 km^{2}), all land.

== Demographics ==
Historical population
Census	Pop.	Note	%±
1980	388		—
1990	365		−5.9%
2000	302		−17.3%
2010	346		14.6%
2020	424		22.5%
U.S. Decennial Census

=== 2010 census ===
As of the census of 2010, there were 346 people, 100 households, and 80 families living in the village. The population density was 617.9 inhabitants per square mile (238.6/km^{2}). There were 117 housing units at an average density of 208.9 per square mile (80.7/km^{2}). The racial makeup of the village was 2.9% White, 92.5% Native American, 0.3% from other races, and 4.3% from two or more races. Hispanic or Latino of any race were 7.5% of the population.

There were 100 households, of which 59.0% had children under the age of 18 living with them, 32.0% were married couples living together, 35.0% had a female householder with no husband present, 13.0% had a male householder with no wife present, and 20.0% were non-families. 18.0% of all households were made up of individuals, and 2% had someone living alone who was 65 years of age or older. The average household size was 3.46 and the average family size was 3.94.

The median age in the village was 21.8 years. 45.4% of residents were under the age of 18; 9.8% were between the ages of 18 and 24; 27.2% were from 25 to 44; 14.5% were from 45 to 64; and 3.2% were 65 years of age or older. The gender makeup of the village was 47.7% male and 52.3% female.

=== 2000 census ===
As of the census of 2000, there were 302 people, 98 households, and 64 families living in the village. The population density was 536.4 inhabitants per square mile (207.1/km^{2}). There were 116 housing units at an average density of 206.0 per square mile (79.5/km^{2}). The racial makeup of the village was 7.28% White, 89.07% Native American, 1.66% from other races, and 1.99% from two or more races. Hispanic or Latino of any race were 0.99% of the population.

There were 98 households, out of which 42.9% had children under the age of 18 living with them, 20.4% were married couples living together, 35.7% had a female householder with no husband present, and 33.7% were non-families. 25.5% of all households were made up of individuals, and 7.1% had someone living alone who was 65 years of age or older. The average household size was 3.08 and the average family size was 3.71.

In the village, the population was spread out, with 45.0% under the age of 18, 11.6% from 18 to 24, 25.2% from 25 to 44, 13.2% from 45 to 64, and 5.0% who were 65 years of age or older. The median age was 21 years. For every 100 females, there were 81.9 males. For every 100 females age 18 and over, there were 80.4 males.

As of 2000 the median income for a household in the village was $16,250, and the median income for a family was $17,813. Males had a median income of $21,875 versus $21,875 for females. The per capita income for the village was $7,879. About 47.5% of families and 45.4% of the population were below the poverty line, including 44.5% of those under the age of eighteen and 53.8% of those 65 or over.
