= St. Andrew's Cathedral (Prince Rupert, British Columbia) =

- Cathedral Church of St. Andrew
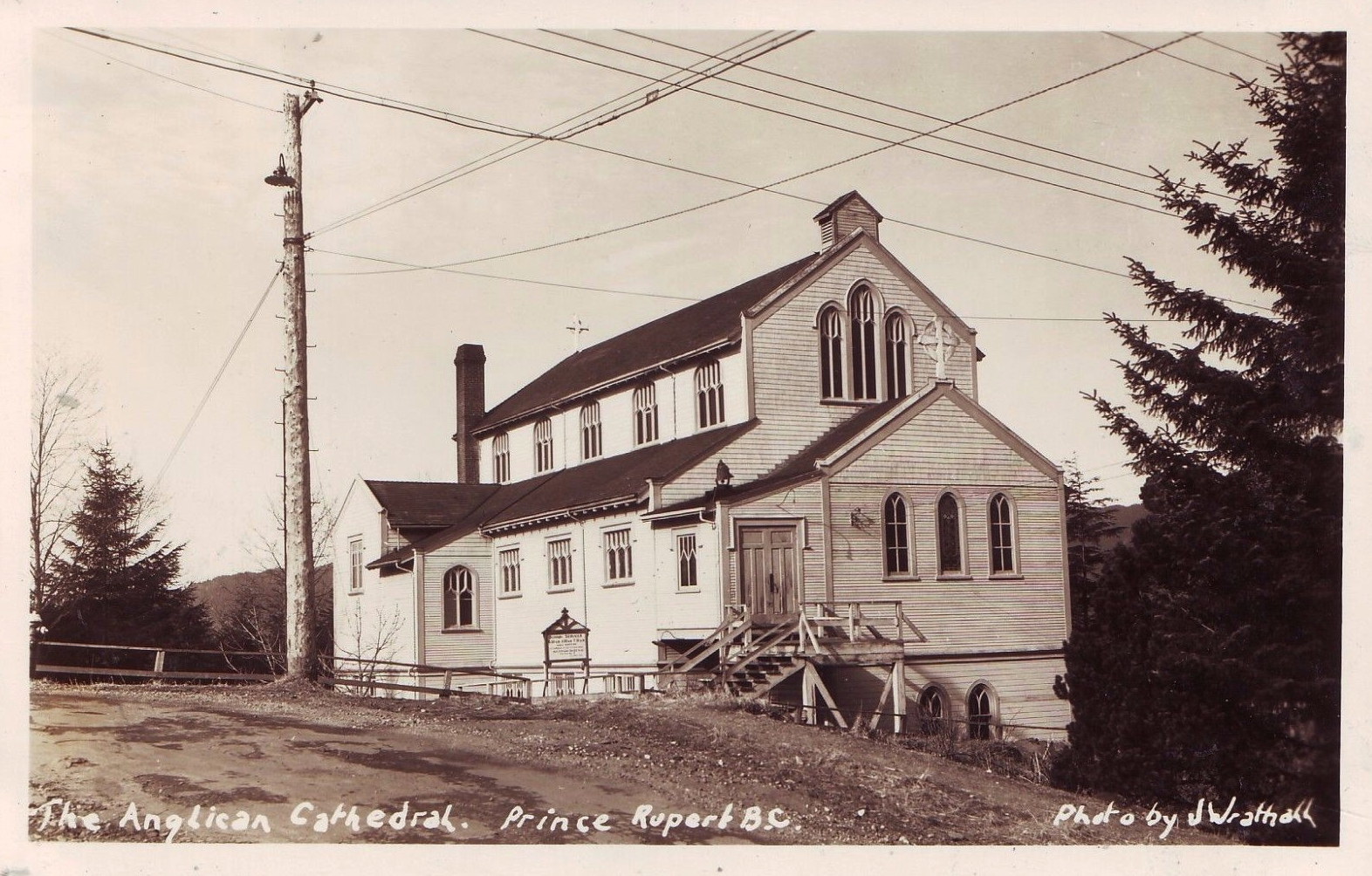
- A postcard of St. Andrew's Cathedral.
- St. Andrew's Cathedral
- 54.314003°N 130.321050°W
- Address: 200 4th Ave. West; Prince Rupert, British Columbia
- Denomination: Anglican Church of Canada
- Website: www.standrewscathedral.ca

Administration
- Province: British Columbia and Yukon
- Diocese: Diocese of Caledonia

Clergy
- Bishop: David Lehmann
- Dean: Paul Williams

St. Andrew's Cathedral is the Anglican cathedral of the Diocese of Caledonia. It is in Prince Rupert, British Columbia.

St. Andrew's Cathedral (more formally, The Cathedral Church of St. Andrew) began as a series of church services held by Bishop Frederick DuVernet in June 1906 in the mess tent of the Grand Trunk Pacific Railway engineers who had arrived in May of that same year. The "congregation", chiefly men of the camp, were called to services by the banging of the cook's triangle. For a time, services were then held in St. Andrew's church hall which was opened on Easter Day, March 3, 1907.

Meanwhile, the church leadership was given first choice of lots in Prince Rupert prior to the general land auction in 1909, and the bluff overlooking the harbour was selected. Plans were drawn up and the hall (which is now the middle third of the Cathedral) was completed in 1912 with financial help from the B.C. and Yukon Church Aid Society. Services and Sunday school were moved in shortly thereafter.

The upper story of the Cathedral was completed by a local contractor in 1925 and the first service in this space was held April 19th of that year. The Casavant pipe organ was purchased and installed the following year.

In September 1929, the National Commission of the General Synod of the Church of England in Canada raised the church to the status of a cathedral with James Gibson as the first Rector and Dean.

The Rector of St Andrew's Cathedral is often the Dean of the Diocese of Caledonia, the Synod office of which is housed in the Cathedral. In the Cathedral's history, the Deans of the Diocese have been:

- 1929 – 1945: James B. Gibson (1st Dean)
- 1946 – 1957: Basil S. Prockter
- 1957 – 1959: Albert Edward Hendy
- 1959 - 1963: G. T. Pattison, D.D.
- 1963 - ?: E. G. Flagg, D. D.
- 1971 - 1985: R. Gary Paterson
- 1985 - 1993: M. J. Wimmer
- 1994 - 1997: Glen R. Burgomaster
- August 1999 - June 2, 2002: Hugo Jackson
- January 4, 2002 – May 25, 2008: Rob Sweet
- October 9, 2009 - June 11, 2011: James Barlow
- October, 2011 – 2017: Jason Haggstrom
- June 1st, 2018 - present: Stephen Paul Williams
