= Herb O'Driscoll =

Irish-born Canadian Anglican priest (1928–2024)

The Reverend Canon Dr. Thomas Herbert O'Driscoll
- Dean of New Westminster
- Diocese: New Westminster
- Predecessor: Northcote Richard Burke
- Successor: James David Cruickshank

Orders
- Ordination: 1953

Personal details
- Born: 17 October 1928 Cork, Ireland
- Died: 25 July 2024 (aged 95) Victoria, British Columbia, Canada
- Education: Trinity College Dublin

Thomas Herbert O'Driscoll (17 October 1928 – 25 July 2024) was an Irish-born Canadian Anglican priest. After emigrating he became one of the most highly regarded preachers in the Anglican Church. A consummate storyteller, a popular broadcast and print commentator, and prolific hymn writer, he authored numerous books on Bible interpretation and the spiritual life, many of which reflect Celtic Christianity.

O'Driscoll was born in 1928 in Cork, Ireland; educated at Trinity College Dublin; and ordained in 1953. After curacies at Monkstown from 1952 to 1954, then Ottawa from 1954 to 1957, he was a naval chaplain from 1957 to 1960, stationed in Dartmouth, Nova Scotia. He then became rector of Carp, Ontario, from 1960 to 1962, following which he returned to Ottawa. He served in Ottawa until his appointment as dean in the Diocese of New Westminster.

== Biography ==
Born in 1928, O'Driscoll spent his childhood and student years in the city of Cork in the south of Ireland. His summers were spent on his grandfather's farm in Donaguile, County Kilkenny.

Following the footsteps of many before him, he sailed across the Atlantic in 1954, and briefly returned to Ireland the following year to marry, then settled permanently in Canada. Since O'Driscoll was a prolific writer, his own words have been selected for most of this entry.

=== Childhood ===
"When I was growing up, to be Protestant in the south of Ireland was to have your otherwise friendly neighbors or professional colleagues assume that you and they had different loyalties. … As a young adult I felt caught between two worlds. My family name indicated quite undeniably that whether or not I was Anglican, my father's family had been Irish and Roman Catholic and had lived in Ireland for untold generations." (1)

=== Student days ===
"In my formative years in Ireland, one entered the past to be prepared for the future. From 1941 to 1945, I was a boarding student at Midleton College, a school founded in 1673 on the estates of the Earl of Midleton. From 1948 to 1952, I attended Trinity College Dublin, a foundation of Elizabeth the First in 1592." (2)

=== Ministry/Career ===
"In July 1952, I was ordained in Dublin's Christ Church Cathedral, having entered by walking past its Norman remains. Pointing from the pulpit that day, directing our eyes to the stone step on which we were about to be ordained, the homilist said: ‘Never forget that men have been ordained on this step for 950 years." O'Driscoll's career, spanning more than 40 years, is described in section below, as is his theology.

=== Marriage and family ===
"I had met the person who would one day become my wife. I was torn between wanting to go to Canada and not wanting to leave Paula. In the end we agreed on a plan. We would become engaged, I would go to Canada and return the following summer for the wedding." Herbert and Paula were married and had four children: Deirdre, Erin, Moira, and Niall.

=== Life in retirement ===
O'Driscoll retired in 1993 and published sixteen books, in addition to contributing regular columns for church publications, leading pilgrimages, and preaching. "The Rev. Canon Dr. Herbert O'Driscoll is many things: former parish priest and cathedral dean, internationally renowned conference and pilgrimage leader, hymnodist and storyteller, author of over fifty books. Perhaps above all, he is a great preacher and teacher of preaching. When invited recently to give an Easter Day sermon on Zoom (at age 92) Herb accepted at once. "After all," he explained, "I'm hard-wired for preaching."

The O'Driscoll Forum was established in 2022. Envisioned as an annual three-day event during the Summer School at the Vancouver School of Theology, includes public lectures by distinguished teachers and practitioners of preaching, teaching, and the liturgical arts.

O'Driscoll died on 25 July 2024, at the age of 95.

== Career ==
1952 – 1954 Curate, Parish of Monkstown, Dublin, Ireland

Following graduation from the Trinity College in Dublin, O'Driscoll was ordained as a deacon and later priest in the Church of Ireland. "I had been instructed to dress in clericals in preparation for ordination. Other parts of my wardrobe—black cassock, white surplice, black stole—were waiting for me at the cathedral. I was aware that I was about to become part of something much greater than myself."

1954 – 1957 Curate, Christ Church Cathedral, Ottawa, ON

O'Driscoll left Cork in October 1954 aboard the RMS Franconia and immigrated to Canada. "Strangely enough, I cannot recall the actual moment when I made one of the most significant decisions in my life, to relocate to Canada. Perhaps much of our decision-making is like that. We think we take a particular step at a certain time on a certain day, but the fact may be that our subconscious has been working away at it for a long time and what we imagine to be a decisive turning point is really just the last stage in a process."

1957 – 1960 Chaplain, Royal Canadian Navy

As a chaplain must be a Canadian citizen, this position required a transition. "I recall standing at the counter (Immigration Office) in downtown Ottawa and being given an application form. The task completed, I was asked to hand over five dollars: a token amount these days, but in those days a substantial subtraction from my curate's income of ninety dollars every two weeks. … I was told sometime later than an RCMP officer from the Canadian Embassy in Dublin came to the parish I had left two years before to come to Canada. He must have been satisfied that I was not trailing any legal baggage behind me and that I was really the person I claimed to be, because some weeks later, I was asked to return to the citizenship office to swear allegiance to Her Majesty as Queen of Canada and to receive my citizen certificate, a valued piece of paper that has been carefully preserved over the years."

1960 – 1962 Rector, Parish of Huntley, Diocese of Ottawa

Huntley was a small three-point parish with a long tradition of rural Anglican life in the Ottawa Valley of Ontario. "This meant that the parish had three of everything—three choirs, three graveyards, three parish councils, three annual vestry meetings. Everything except three rectors. … A bishop who was a long-time good friend used to say of such places that their commitment to the church was so steady, so unwavering, so instinctive, that if they had the best parish priest in the country, there would be at most three people more in the pew on Sunday, and if they had the worst priest going, there would be at most three people less."

1962 – 1968 Rector, St. John the Evangelist, Ottawa, ON

In addition to regular parish duties, O'Driscoll was active in media ministry with weekly Sunday radio broadcasts for the Diocese of Ottawa. A recurring image in O'Driscoll's ministry is ‘earthquake.' Why does God shake the earth from time to time? "So that what cannot be shaken may remain." (Heb 12:27). "Hearing that preacher 's insight in 1963 has been a golden thread through my years of ministry. It has become a metaphor of vocation I have offered to others many times. To serve in an age of cultural and theological earthquake is to be forced to decide what it is for each one of us that cannot be shaken."

1968 – 1982 Dean & Rector, Christ Church Cathedral, Vancouver, BC

Shortly after O'Driscoll's arrival, church membership voted to demolish the 1895 building and replace it with a hi-rise tower complex with a new underground cathedral. The redevelopment was opposed by the public and in 1976 after much lobbying the cathedral was designated a Heritage Building. "For some, I was a cultural barbarian and philistine. For others, I was the harbinger of a newly invigorated Christianity. … During the early stages of the cathedral issue, I tried to discuss things with Isabel (a parishioner), but she would have none of it. As far as she was concerned, the whole thing ‘would come to no good.' … One morning … Isabel appeared holding a large placard on a pole whose text read, ‘The dean should resign.' … It was a strange kind of friendship. …There came a time when the ambitious plans for change had to be abandoned. … Some years later, when I had left for ministry elsewhere, other changes were conceived and brought to fruition, enhancing the traditional cathedral's life at the centre of the city. …I am certain that had she lived to see that renewed cathedral, Isabel would have approved." His daily radio series, "One Man's Journal" offered reflections on contemporary living. He wrote, "The idea of a daily radio program seemed too demanding when it was first suggested to me. I felt that the first fifty ‘pages' of such a journal would be easy, the next fifty would take more thought, and the third fifty would be a burden, and the next fifty an agony! What I didn't realize was that life itself, and our living of it, writes our daily journals."

1982 – 1984 Canon and Warden, National College of Preachers and National Cathedral of St. Peter & St. Paul, Washington DC

The College of Preachers, opened in 1929, was originally conceived as a centre for the renewal of preaching for Episcopal clergy. "For more than half a century before I arrived, the college offered courses in preaching to clergy from all parts of the country. It was regarded as a significant resource within the Episcopal Church." "For me, those two years as a warden were a deep learning experience. Put simply, I realized that the college was far more than a place of teaching and learning. It was nothing less than a haven of healing in an age when clerical ministry was—as it still is—becoming increasingly stressful and demanding. The experience of attending the college alongside colleagues with similar challenges had the potential to be a part of this healing process." During this period he also participated in a broadcast series for the Episcopal Radio-Television Foundation and NBC's National Radio Pulpit Series USA.

1983 – 1993 Rector, Christ Church, Calgary AB

O'Driscoll observed that one of the great silent transformations of the 20th century was the rise of the primacy of the individual in western society. "If on a Sunday morning in 1952 you had asked the rector of Christ Church what he was looking at as he surveyed his congregation, he would — having first wondered why we were asking the question — answered in a way I will call "institutionally." He would have said, ‘I'm looking at the Anglican congregation of Christ Church Calgary.' He would have meant a corporate entity formed of a common loyalty to such elements as the Bishop of the Diocese, the Prayer Book, Anglican tradition, Holy Scripture. If, on the other hand, you had asked that question in the years of my own incumbency from 1984 to 1993, I would no longer have had the luxury of answering in those corporate/institutional terms. Such bonds had become so weak as to be vestigial. Because the primacy of the individual in western society had become so dominant, I would have had to reply something like this: ‘I am looking at a couple of hundred individual personal spiritual journeys, each one in search of meaning and reassurance in a culture of relentless change, transition and fragmentation.' … The corollary of all this for me was that parish ministry called for an acknowledgement that the contemporary lives of Christ Church had become infinitely varied and deeply personal, and, perhaps sadly, distrustful of institution and tradition. I realized that to respond adequately required the development of whatever intuitive powers I had been given. Above all I learned to ask a single overriding question in any conversation or interaction: ‘What is the human agenda in this situation?''

1993 Visiting Scholar, St George's College, Jerusalem

St George's College Jerusalem, established in 1920, is a continuing education center of the Anglican Communion. Its mission includes educating clergy and laity from other parts of the world.

1993 – 2009 Adjunct Faculty, National College of Preachers, Washington DC

O'Driscoll's involvement with the College spanned twenty-five years. "As those years went by, and the unrelenting tides of change continued to flow over church and society, I could see that the healing aspect of the college's work was becoming, if anything, even more significant and valuable. Ironically, even tragically, the need for this healing role became more and more obvious at the same time as the church's sense of the importance of the homiletic function was lessening."

1995 – current Honorary Assistant, Christ Church Cathedral, Victoria, BC

Honorary Assistants are retired clergy who contribute from the store of their long and accomplished experience. In this role, O'Driscoll has led clergy conferences in Canada, the United States, and Ireland. He has led 25 pilgrimages to Ireland, Iona, Canterbury and Brittany and many other speaking, preaching, and teaching engagements. He has written extensively for diocesan publications, and his most recent book, "I Will Arise and Go Now: Reflections on the Meaning of Places & People" was published in 2021.

Panoramic Preaching

Born between world wars in Ireland, O'Driscoll was steeped in Church of Ireland theology and piety. As World War II expanded on the continent, he was a teenager in a church administered boarding school. "In those days the Church of Ireland set an annual examination in religion for all students in its schools. As the time for the actual examination would approach, all other subjects in the school's daily schedule were cancelled. From 9:00 a.m. to 3:00 p.m. … we studied Old Testament, New Testament, and Church Catechism. This would continue for at least two weeks."

Fifty years later, as an Anglican preacher instructing younger clergy, he realized the scene had flipped. Religion classes were no more, and other subjects took precedence. It was now a secular age of increased biblical illiteracy. In his preaching and seminar teaching, O'Driscoll emphasized "panoramic preaching" to expand the biblical text to frame its larger context to inform his secular audience.

O'Driscoll's theology of panoramic preaching takes ancient texts and engages them to speak to contemporary contexts:

· Exodus in an age of refugees and human migration;

· Wilderness in an age of pandemic and disinformation;

· Resurrection hope in our age of denial, despair, and death.

O'Driscoll's panoramic preaching unfolded and enlarged a text to form and inform his audience's knowledge and faith. Panoramic preaching could take a wide variety of biblical characters and enlarge their story to encompass parallel comparisons to contemporary saints and sinners.

O'Driscoll's theology of panoramic preaching invites contemporary preachers to use the lectionary for biblical education. For example, in the current three year Revised Common Lectionary, Year A centers on the Gospel of Matthew, Year B focuses on the Gospel of Mark, and Year C explores the Gospel of Luke, while all three include substantial portions of the Gospel of John. O'Driscoll's panoramic preaching would spend a Sunday or two within a church year season such as Advent or Lent, to unpack each of those Gospels' central themes, characters, sorrows, and hopes.

In his 2019 book, "A Greening of Imaginations: Walking the Songlines of Holy Scripture" (New York: Church Publishing, 2019) O'Driscoll explores "imaginative preaching." Inspired by a Jewish rabbi colleague, he sketches an exercise in Christian midrash. He imaginatively enters into familiar biblical stories and opens windows to fresh insight and meaning to refresh faith.

== Publications ==
=== Books ===
I Will Arise and Go Now: Reflections on the Meaning of Places & People (Moorehouse, 2021). ISBN 978-1-64065-335-1

A Greening of Imaginations: Walking the Songlines of Holy Scripture (Church Publishing, 2019). ISBN 978-1-64065-144-9

Confound Them!: Diabolical Plans for the Church (Anglican Book Centre, 2009). ISBN 978-1-55126-318-2

Prayer Among Friends (Path, 2008). ISBN 978-1-55126-501-8

Four Days in Spring: Christ Suffering, Dying and Rising in Our Lives (Path, 2007). ISBN 978-1-55126-493-6

Finer Than Gold, Sweeter Than Honey: The Psalms for Our Living. (Dundum, 2006). ISBN 978-1-55126-449-3

Praise, My Soul: The Hymns of Herbert O'Driscoll. (Selah, 2005). ISBN 0-9677408-7-8

Living Scripture: The Guidance of God on the Journal of Life. (Dundurn, 2005). ISBN 978-1-55126-436-3

God With Us: The Companionship of Jesus in the Challenges of Life. (Dundurn, 2002). ISBN 978-1-4616-3541-3

The Road to Donaguile: A Celtic Spiritual Journey. (Cowley, 2000). ISBN 978-1-56101-173-5

Confound Them!: Diabolical Plans for the Church. (Anglican Book Centre, 2009). ISBN 978-1-55126-318-2[PT1]

Mourners of Midwives: Choices for the 21st Century. (Logos, 1999). ISBN 978-1-55126-231-4

Conversations in Time With Men and Women of the Bible. (Cowley, 1999). ISBN 978-1-56101-155-1

Birth: Holding Your Newborn Child. (Anglican Book Centre, 1999). ISBN 978-1-55126-130-0

Hope for a Time of Grieving. (Anglican Book Centre, 1998). ISBN 978-1-55126-186-7

Marriage in the Christian Church. (Anglican Book Centre, 1998). ISBN 978-0-88028-191-1

The Word Today: Reflections on the Readings of the Revised Common Lectionary. (Anglican Book Centre, 1997).

Year A, Vol 1 ( ISBN 978-1-55126-221-5); Vol 2 ( ISBN 978-1-55126-332-8); Vol 3 ( ISBN 978-1-55126-333-5)

Year B, Vol 1 ( ISBN 978-1-55126-334-2); Vol 2 ( ISBN 978-0-921846-32-1); Vol 3 ( ISBN 978-1-55126-336-6)

Year C, Vol 1 ( ISBN 978-1-55126-337-3); Vol 2 ( ISBN 978-1-55126-338-0); Vol 3 ( ISBN 978-1-55126-339-7)

Grace for a Time of Sickness. (Anglican Book Centre, 1995). ISBN 978-1-55126-134-8

Eucharist: The Feast that Never Ends. (Anglican Book Centre, 1995). ISBN 0-88028-192-8

Baptism: Saying Yes to Being a Christian. (Anglican Book Centre, 1995). ISBN 978-0-88028-188-1

For All the Saints: Homilies for Saints and Holy Days. (Cowley, 1995). ISBN 978-1-56101-111-7. Also published as Heralds of God: Homilies for Saints and Holy Days. (Anglican Book Centre, 1995). ISBN 978-1-55126-115-7

The Leap of the Deer: Memories of a Celtic Childhood. (Cowley, 1994). ISBN 978-1-56101-093-6

Heritage: A Tale of Two Books. (Anglican Book Centre, 1993). ISBN 0-921846-56-8

Emmanuel: Encountering Jesus as Lord. (Cowley, 1992). ISBN 978-1-56101-059-2

Prayers for the Breaking of Bread: Mediations on the Collects of the Church Year. (Cowley, 1991). ISBN 978-1-56101-045-5

A Good Time for Good News: Reflections on the Gospel for People on the Go. (Anglican Book Centre, 1990).

Year A, ISBN 978-0-921846-07-9

Year B, ISBN 978-0-921846-32-1

Year C, ISBN 978-0-921846-41-3

Praying to the Lord of Life. (Anglican Book Centre, 1989). ISBN 978-0-921846-05-5

A Year of the Lord. (Morehouse, 1987). ISBN 978-0-8192-1400-3

A Doorway in Time: Memoir of a Celtic Spiritual Journey. (Cowley, 1985). ISBN 978-0-06-066340-7

The Sacred Mirror: Encountering Good in Scripture. (Anglican Book Centre, 1984). ISBN 0-919891-12-8

City Priest, City People. (Anglican Book Centre, 1983). ISBN 978-0-919891-04-3

One Man's Journal. (Anglican Book Centre, 1982). ISBN 978-0-919030-89-3

Crossroads: Times of Decision for People of God. (Seabury Press, 1982). ISBN 978-0-8164-2432-0

Portrait of a Woman: Meditations on the Mother of Our Lord. (Anglican Book Centre, 1981). ISBN 978-0-919030-70-1

A Certain Life: Contemporary Meditations on the Way of Christ. (Seabury Press, 1980). ISBN 978-0-8164-2040-7

For All Seasons. (Anglican Book Centre, 1979). ISBN 0-919030-48-3

Unshakeable Kingdom. (Christian Journals, 1977). ISBN 978-0-904302-29-5

=== Hymnody ===
Herbert O'Driscoll's hymn writing from 1966 to 2002 ranges over many subjects. They are set to a variety of tunes, from familiar to newly composed, and were collected in a book titled Praise, My Soul. (ref a) Of hymn writing he said, "And always there is the same excitement. It may be the sudden arrival of a first line, complete and ready to be added to—demanding to be added to! It may be the sudden arrival of the overall idea or plan for a hymn, this time demanding that work begin immediately on constructing the stanzas. But whatever the first moment of awareness may be, there is the thrill of a new hymn." They include:

Songs of Creation

Before the Earth Had Yet Begun (1986)

The Lord of All Creation (1981)

God of the Heavens (1976)

Sing of a God in Majestic Divinity (1980)

God Most High in Power and Splendour (1982)

O God, Beyond All Face and Form (1989)

Lord God, Who Spoke Creation's Word (1979)

God of this Great Creation (1976)

Songs of Incarnation

On Wings of Wondrous Majesty (1981)

There Was a Maid in Nazareth (1980)

Down the Road to Bethlehem (1999)

O My Saviour in the Manger (1999)

Three Tall Trees Grew on a Windy Hill (1971)

When Mary and Joseph from Bethlehem Town (1981)

When All the Hills of Galilee (1981)

Songs of the People of God

In the Rock It Was Written (1977)

In the Lives of Men and Women (2000)

Long, Long Ago in Israel (1995)

Who Are We Who Stand and Sing (1978)

We Give You Thanks, O Lord (1987)

Songs of Word & Sacrament

God, You Have Caused to Be Written (1966)

Sing of Eve and Sing of Adam (1982)

When Jesus Came to Galilee (2002)

When Jesus Arose (1976)

Children of Bethlehem (1977)

Though I Speak the Tongues of Mortals (1997)

One Night the Lord Jesus Sat Down (1986)

All Praise to You, Creator God (1967)

Praise Be to Christ (1989)

Songs of Personal Devotion

Lord, When My Heart and Mind (1980)

Surely It Is God Who Saves Me (1981)

Where Shall I Seek Thee? (1979)

God, When I Stand (1980)

Songs of Sacred Places

Here Is a Place of Loveliness (1985)

Beneath the Branches Far Above (1981)

Lord of the Western Prairie (1989)

Songs of the Journey

God Calls Us to Journey (1986)

Come and Journey with a Saviour (1985)

Let My People Seek Their Freedom (1971)

Lord of Life Hear Us Sing (1966)

When the Ship Is Standing Ready (1969)

The Love of Jesus Calls Us (1989)

== Awards and honours ==
The O'Driscoll Forum is a three-day event of public lectures on preaching, teaching, and the liturgical arts. Vancouver School of Theology, 2022.

- Honorary Senior Fellow, Renison College, University of Waterloo, 1994.
- Dr. of Divinity, Honoris Causa, Wycliffe College, University of Toronto, 1991.
- Dr. of Sacred Theology, Honoris Causa, Berkeley Divinity School, Yale University, 1982.
- Dr. of Divinity, Honoris Causa, Vancouver School of Theology, University of British Columbia, 1981.
- Gold Medalist in Oratory, Trinity College Dublin, 1952
