= William Armitage =

William Armitage may refer to:

- William Edmond Armitage (1830–1873), bishop of the Episcopal Church
- William James Armitage (1860–1929), Anglican minister in Canada
- Ramsay Armitage (William Robert Ramsay Armitage, 1889–1984), Canadian Anglican priest
- Kenneth Armitage (William Kenneth Armitage, 1916–2002), British sculptor
