= Bishop of New Westminster =

Bishop of New Westminster may refer to:

- the Anglican Bishop of New Westminster
- the Roman Catholic Bishop of New Westminster, the former Diocese of New Westminster is now the Archdiocese of Vancouver, so the current title is Archbishop of Vancouver
