= Ramsay Armitage =

Canadian Anglican priest (1889–1984)

William Robert Ramsay Armitage MC (2 April 1889 – 12 April 1984) was a Canadian Anglican priest. He was Dean of New Westminster from 1929 to 1940.

Armitage was educated at the University of Toronto and ordained in 1914. After a curacy at the Church of the Messiah, Toronto, he was a chaplain to the Canadian Armed Forces during World War I, 3rd Battalion, Royal Regiment of Canada. He was awarded the Military Cross in the 1919 Birthday Honours for Bravery under fire rescuing wounded from the battlefield at Vimy Ridge, France. When peace returned he went back to his parish, becoming vicar in 1921. He stayed here until his appointment as dean. In 1940 he became Principal of Wycliffe College, Toronto: a professorship there is named in his honour.
