= Frederick Du Vernet =

Canadian Anglican bishop (1860–1924)

The Most Reverend Frederick Du Vernet
- 1st Metropolitan of British Columbia; Archbishop of Caledonia
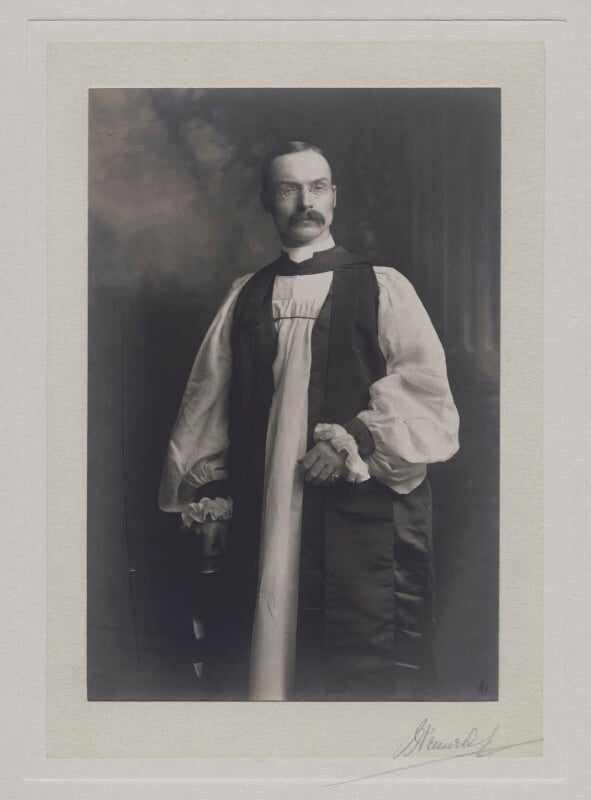
- Du Vernet, c. 1915
- Church: Anglican Church of Canada
- Province: British Columbia
- Diocese: Caledonia
- In office: 1915–1924
- Successor: Adam de Pencier
- Other post: Bishop of Caledonia (1904–1924)

Orders
- Ordination: 21 January 1883 by William Bond

Personal details
- Born: January 20, 1860 Hemmingford, Province of Canada, British North America
- Died: October 22, 1924 (aged 64) Prince Rupert, British Columbia, Canada
- Spouse: Stella Yates (m. 1895)
- Children: 3
- Education: Wycliffe College

Frederick Herbert Du Vernet (20 January 1860 – 22 October 1924) was a Canadian Anglican bishop. He was the second Bishop of Caledonia and inaugural Metropolitan of British Columbia (taking the title Archbishop of Caledonia whilst metropolitan).

Du Vernet was educated at Wycliffe College, Toronto, and ordained in 1883. After a curacy at St. James the Apostle, Montreal, from 1883–1884, he was diocesan missioner for the Diocese of Montreal then professor of practical theology at Wycliffe College until 1895. From then until 1904, he was rector of St. John's Church, West Toronto, when he was appointed to the episcopate. He became a Doctor of Divinity (DD).

In 1895, he married Stella Yates, with whom he had three children.

In July 1898, he embarked on a mission to the Rainy River area in Ontario, where he visited the Ojibwe people living in the area.

On 14 October 1904, William Bond appointed him to the Diocese of Caledonia. He was consecrated as bishop on 30 November that year at Christ Church Cathedral in Montreal. During his time in Caledonia, he lived and worked among the First Nations in the region, particularly the Nisga'a and the Haida. He often heard and addressed their concerns, and criticized colonial institutions such as the residential schools.

In 1915, he became the first Metropolitan of British Columbia, a position he held until his death in 1924.

Church of England titles
| Preceded by William Ridley | Bishop of Caledonia (Archbishop from 1915); 1904–1924 | Vacant Title next held by George Rix |
| New title | Metropolitan of British Columbia; 1915–1924 | Succeeded by Adam de Pencier |
