= Christ Church Cathedral (Vancouver) =

Anglican cathedral in Vancouver, Canada

Cathedral and Metropolitical Church of Christ (Vancouver)
- Christ Church Cathedral in Downtown Vancouver
- Cathedral and Metropolitical Church of Christ (Vancouver)
- 49°17′03″N 123°07′13″W
- Location: 690 Burrard Street; Vancouver, British Columbia; V6C 2L1
- Denomination: Anglican Church of Canada
- Churchmanship: Broad church
- Website: www.thecathedral.ca

Administration
- Province: British Columbia and Yukon
- Diocese: New Westminster
- Deanery: Burrard

Clergy
- Bishop: John Stephens
- Dean: Christopher Pappas
- Priest(s): Areeta Bridgemohan (vicar), Clare Morgan, Matthew Senf, Melanie Calabrigo, Adam Dawkins (curate)

The Cathedral and Metropolitical Church of Christ in Vancouver, British Columbia, Canada, is the cathedral church of the Anglican Diocese of New Westminster of the Anglican Church of Canada, and the second church to have been the diocese's cathedral. A place of worship in Greater Vancouver, the cathedral is located at 690 Burrard Street on the northeast corner of West Georgia Street, directly across from the Fairmont Hotel Vancouver in Downtown Vancouver.

== History ==
Christ Church is a daughter church of St. James' Anglican Church. The first service was held, without a church building, on December 23, 1888, at 720 Granville Street. On February 14, 1889, a building committee was formed to collect the necessary funds for the erection of the church. It would be located on land bought from the Canadian Pacific Railway (CPR); Henry John Cambie, chief engineer of CPR's Pacific Division and people's warden of the new church, was a key negotiator in acquiring the property.

By October 1889, Christ Church's basement was built and on October 6, the opening service was held for 52 parishioners. The joy of a new church was short-lived. By 1891 the CPR objected to the unfinished building that had quickly been nicknamed the root house. It was viewed an "eyesore" and the parishioners feared they would lose their location due to lack of funds to complete the building. The architect Robert Mackay Fripp submitted a proposal for completion of the church in 1892.

A financing scheme was developed by a parishioner and the cornerstone was finally laid July 28, 1894, and the church dedicated on February 17, 1895. The church was built in the Gothic style with ceiling made of cedar planking and ceiling beams and floor constructed out of old growth Douglas fir. By 1909, the first expansion was done and by 1911, the first organ had already worn out. It used a human blower hired at $5 per month and was replaced by a new organ manufactured by Wurlitzer.

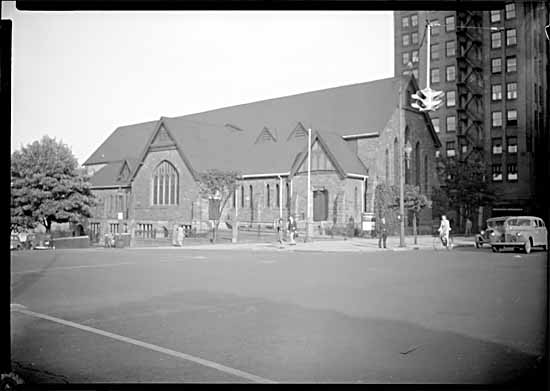
View of Christ Church Cathedral, c. late 1930s

In 1920, electricity replaced candles for lighting, and in 1930 the lanterns now in the church were installed.

In 1929, the Archbishop of New Westminster constituted Christ Church as the Cathedral Church of the diocese, replacing Holy Trinity Cathedral in the City of New Westminster.

The church planned to build a bell tower, but in 1943, the city by-laws were changed to restrict church bells. In November 2016, a bell tower was inaugurated. Its four bells are rung daily at 8:00 am and 6:00 pm and before church services.

In 1949, after many building alterations, the Casavant organ was installed. Constructed partially of war surplus parts and remnants of the Wurlitzer, the instrument served well but had a problematic history. 2004 saw the installation of a Kenneth Jones tracker organ in the south gallery of the renovated cathedral. Comprising a three manual console and 2500 pipes, 1700 salvaged from the Casavant, it is the first Christ Church Cathedral organ custom built to speak with optimum effect in the sanctuary.

In 1971, the church membership voted to demolish the building and replace it with a hi-rise tower complex designed by Arthur Erickson. The redevelopment was opposed by the public and in 1976 after much lobbying, the cathedral was named a Class A Heritage building in the municipality of Vancouver and the Province of British Columbia. In 1995, an eleven-year program of restoration and renewal was begun.

Christ Church Cathedral is the Regimental Church of the Seaforth Highlanders and is in the process of being designated Regimental Church of the BC Regiment, Duke of Connaught's Own.

Bishop Michael Ingham authorized a liturgy for the celebration of lesbian and gay covenants in December 2002. Christ Church Cathedral's Annual Vestry meeting in February 2003 gave approval for the ministry to be offered as part of the parish's pastoral care for the community. On September 25, 2014, the parish submitted "A Statement in Favour of the Solemnization of Same Sex Matrimony in the Anglican Church of Canada" to the Anglican Church of Canada's commission on the marriage canon. This statement was submitted by the cathedral's clergy, wardens and parish council.

== Worship ==
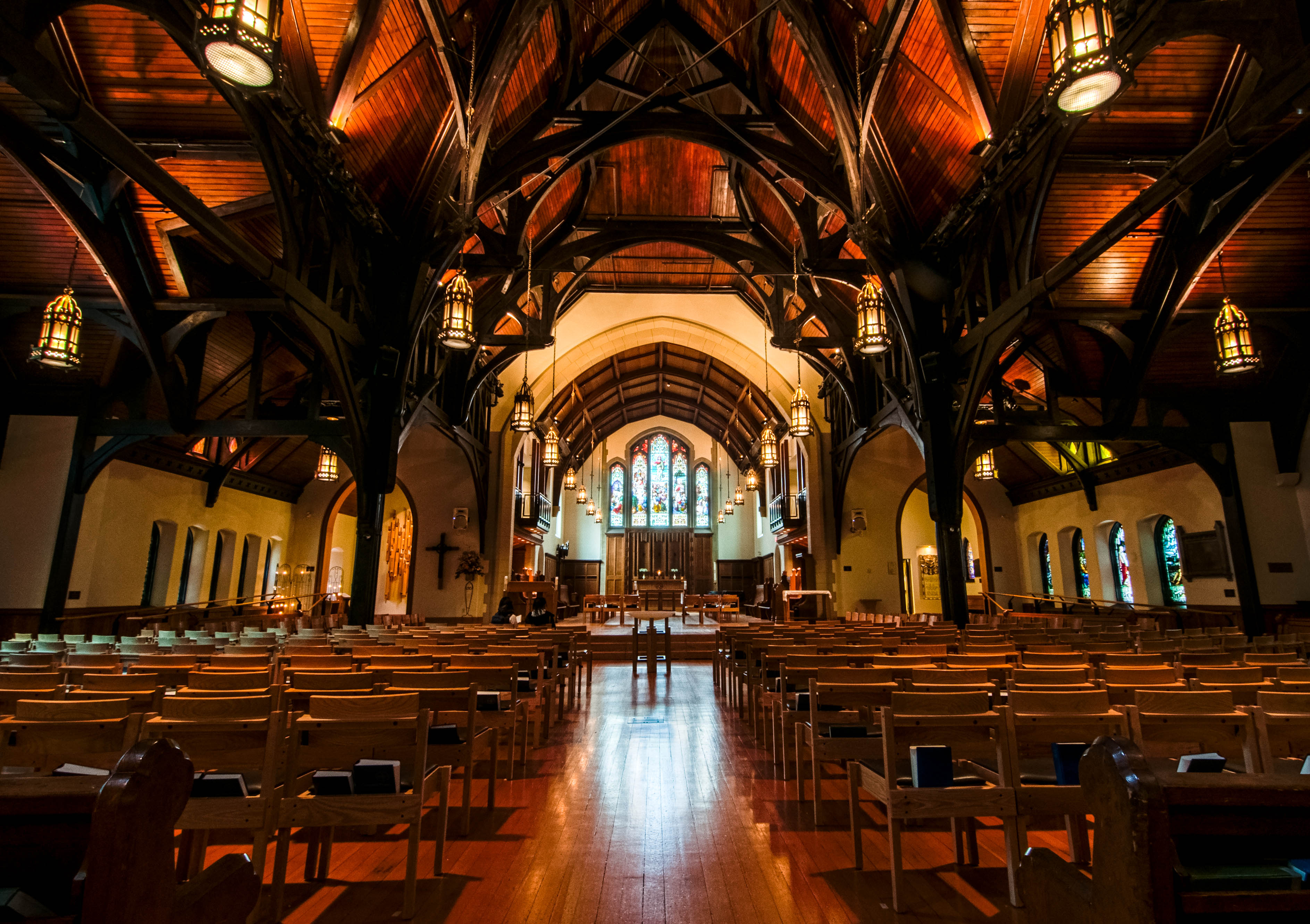
View of the cathedral altar from the nave of the cathedral

Holy Communion is celebrated using both the Book of Common Prayer and the Book of Alternative Services. Both a simple spoken celebration and a choral or sung Eucharist celebrated with congregational hymns featuring an eclectic mix of Mass settings, psalmody, anthems and instrumental music are practised. Music in worship ranges from plainsong to motets from the baroque and classical periods to contemporary and world music. Cathedral musician Rupert Lang is a prolific and respected composer and many of his sacred pieces debut during this liturgy.

The cathedral clergy share preaching duties at services with guest preachers booked throughout the year. Guest preachers in the recent past have included a former Archbishop of Canterbury, Robert Runcie, and the noted environmental scientist David Suzuki. It is also the church at which the royal family worships when in Vancouver.

In May 2014, the cathedral formed St. Brigid's, a community rooted in the Emerging Church movement rooted in the Anglican tradition.

== Deans of New Westminster ==
Holy Trinity Cathedral in New Westminster formerly housed the Dean of New Westminster, until that seat was moved to Christ Church Cathedral in Vancouver in 1929. The following is a list of deans of New Westminster since 1929:

- Robert John Renison, 1927–1931, 1st dean (afterwards Bishop of Athabasca, 1931)
- Ramsay Armitage, 1936–1940
- Cecil Beresford Swanson, 1940–1953
- Northcote Richard Burke, 1953–1968
- Thomas Herbert O'Driscoll, 1968–1982
- James David Cruickshank, 1983–1993 (afterwards Bishop of the Diocese of the Cariboo)
- Michael Ingham, 1993–1994 (afterwards Anglican Bishop of New Westminster, 1994–2013)
- Peter Elliott, 1994–2019
- Christopher Pappas, 2020–present

== Heraldry ==
The celtic cross, which is found on both the cathedral's exterior and interior, represents the roots of the Anglican Communion in the British Isles. The spindle whorl and the three salmon in the style of the Coast Salish Nation, represent the First People of Canada and the original inhabitants of the west coast.

The Greek letters Chi (X) and Rho (P) in the centre are the initials of the words Christus Rex, Christ the King. The motto is "I hold before you an open door" (Revelation 3:8), the title of the first sermon preached in the cathedral by the rector, the Rev. H. B. Hobson, December 23, 1888.

== See also ==
- List of cathedrals in Canada
- List of heritage buildings in Vancouver

== Bibliography ==
- anon. (1973). The Glory of God Is Man Fully Alive: Cathedral Place - A Place for People. Vancouver: unknown pub. p. 30.
- anon. (2005). Christ Church Cathedral: A Brief History. Vancouver: unknown pub. p. 8.
- anon. (2016). Ring Out! A Celebration of Raise the Roof, Ring the Bells, Feed the Hungry. Vancouver: Christ Church Cathedral. p. 23.
- Adams, Neale (2006) [1989]. Living Stones: A History of Christ Church Cathedral, Vancouver, BC (2 ed.). Vancouver: Christ Church Cathedral. p. 144. ISBN 9780978220709.
