= Sillitoe =

Sillitoe is a surname. Notable people with the surname include:

- Acton Sillitoe (1840–1894), British Anglican bishop
- Alan Sillitoe (1928–2010), British writer
- Les Sillitoe (1915–1996), British trade union leader and politician
- Linda Sillitoe (1948–2010), American journalist, poet and historian
- Neville Sillitoe (born 1925), Australian athletics coach
- Nicholas Sillitoe (born 1971), British composer and music producer
- Percy Sillitoe (1888–1962), British law enforcement executive

== See also ==
- Sillitoe tartan is a nickname given to the distinctive black and white chequered pattern often used by police
