= Horace Watts =

Anglican bishop

Horace Godfrey Watts (29 May 1901 – 5 April 1959) was the fifth Anglican Bishop of Caledonia in Canada.

Watts was educated at the University of Saskatchewan and ordained in 1926. He was a missionary priest in Henan, China and then Onishi, Japan. Later he was Field Secretary of the Missionary Society of the Church of England in Canada before his ordination to the episcopate in 1953.

Church of England titles
Preceded by James Byers Gibson	Bishop of Caledonia; 1953– 1959	Succeeded by Eric George Munn
