= John Hannen =

Canadian Anglican bishop

John Edward Hannen (born 19 November 1937) was the eighth Bishop of Caledonia.

Rt. Rev. John E. Hannen was adopted as a wolf member of Kwaxsuu by late Peter Calder, he held the name Lihlksim Matx Gibuu, which is translated as Wolf Shepherd.

Hannen was educated at McGill University and ordained in 1964 after studying at the College of the Resurrection, Mirfield. After a curacy at St Alphege's Solihull he was priest in charge at the mission to the Hart Highway in the Diocese of Caledonia. He was then priest at St Andrew's Greenville, British Columbia and then priest in charge at the Church of Christ the King, Port Edward, British Columbia. From 1971 to 1981 he was Rector at Christ Church, Kincolith when he was ordained to the episcopate.

Hannen was the Acting Metropolitan of the Ecclesiastical Province of British Columbia and the Yukon from 1993 to 1994.

Hannen resigned as Bishop of Caledonia in 2001 to become Rector of St. Barnabas' Church in Victoria BC, and to work with First Nations people in Greater Victoria. He retired in 2007, and is an Honorary Assistant at Christ Church Cathedral in Victoria.

Anglican Communion titles
Preceded by Eric George Munn	Bishop of Caledonia; 1981– 2001	Succeeded by William Anderson
