= George Rix (bishop) =

Canadian Anglican bishop

- Church: Church of England in Canada

Orders
- Consecration: 9 September 1928 by Adam de Pencier

George Alexander Rix VD (1865 – 2 April 1945) was the third Anglican Bishop of Caledonia in Canada. He was elected to this position after an interregnum of four years due to the diocese's lack of funds.

Rix was born in Barrie, educated at Wycliffe College and ordained in 1893. He was the incumbent at Cannington and Beaverton, Ontario. Next he was an assistant priest at the Church of the Redeemer, Toronto before returning to Wycliffe College as its dean. He then became the rector of Orangeville, Ontario and then the Archdeacon of Prince Rupert. He was ordained to the episcopate in 1928 and died in office.

Church of England titles
Preceded by Frederick Du Vernet	Bishop of Caledonia; 1928–1945	Succeeded by James Byers Gibson
