= Windsor Report =

2004 Anglican LGBT report

In 2003, the Lambeth Commission on Communion was appointed by the Anglican Communion to study problems stemming from the consecration of Gene Robinson, the first non-celibate, openly gay priest to be ordained as an Anglican bishop, in the Episcopal Church in the United States and the blessing of same-sex unions in the Anglican Diocese of New Westminster. The Commission, chaired by Archbishop Robin Eames, published its findings as the "Windsor Report" on 18 October 2004. The report recommended a covenant for the Anglican Communion, an idea that did not come to fruition.

== Background ==
The 1998 Lambeth Conference of Anglican bishops passed a resolution on human sexuality stating that it "in view of the teaching of Scripture, upholds faithfulness in marriage between a man and a woman in lifelong union" and that it could not "advise the legitimising or blessing of same sex unions nor ordaining those involved in same gender unions".

=== Same-sex unions and Robinson's election ===
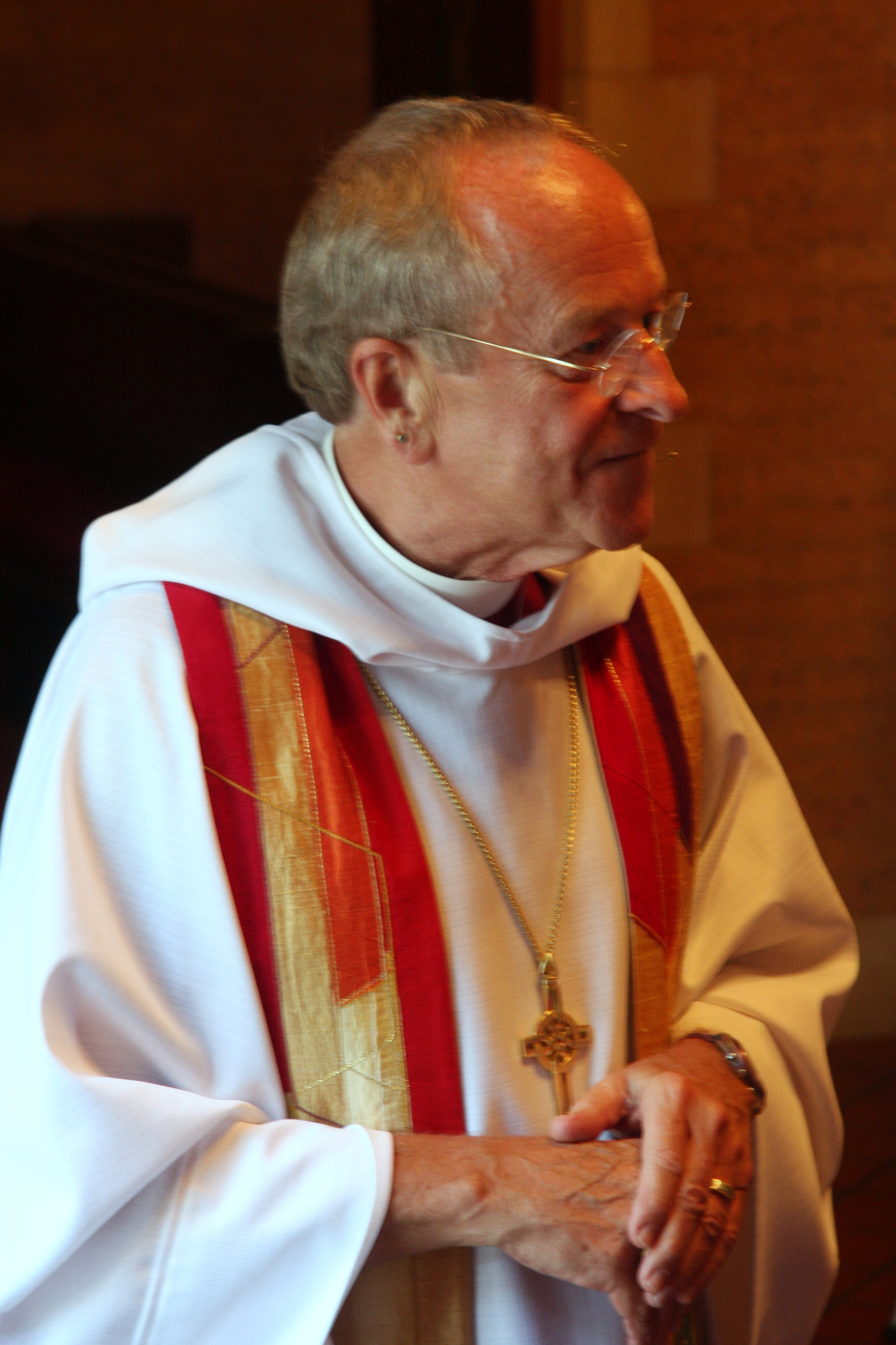
Bishop Gene Robinson

One Canadian diocese, New Westminster, authorised a rite for the blessing of same-sex unions at its 2002 Diocesan Synod. The use of the rite by individual parishes was incumbent upon a specific request of the parish made through its annual vestry meeting or resolution of its parochial church council. In May 2003, six of the diocese's 76 parishes received authorisation to use the rite.

In 2003, the Episcopal Church's General Convention consented to the Diocese of New Hampshire's election of Gene Robinson as its bishop. Robinson's election prompted a group of 19 bishops, led by Bishop Robert Duncan of the Diocese of Pittsburgh, to make a statement warning the church of a possible schism between the Episcopal Church and the Anglican Communion. The Archbishop of Canterbury, Rowan Williams, stated that it would "inevitably have a significant impact on the Anglican Communion throughout the world and it is too early to say what the result of that will be". He added, "It is my hope that the church in America and the rest of the Anglican Communion will have the opportunity to consider this development before significant and irrevocable decisions are made in response". Retired South African Archbishop Desmond Tutu stated that he did not see what "all the fuss" was about, saying the election would not roil the Church of the Province of Southern Africa. Other senior bishops of the church, like Peter Akinola, Archbishop of the Church of Nigeria, stated that their churches were in an "impaired communion" with the Episcopal Church.

As a result of the controversy over the consecration of Gene Robinson as bishop and the blessing of same-sex unions, on 15 October 2003, Anglican leaders from around the world met in Lambeth Palace in an attempt to avoid a schism on the issue. The day after, they released a lengthy statement:

We must make clear that recent actions in New Westminster and in the Episcopal Church (USA) do not express the mind of our Communion as a whole, and these decisions jeopardise our sacramental fellowship with each other [...] This will tear the fabric of our Communion at its deepest level, and may lead to further division on this and further issues as provinces have to decide in consequence whether they can remain in communion with provinces that choose not to break communion with the Episcopal Church (USA). Similar considerations apply to the situation pertaining in the Diocese of New Westminster.

The Primates also asked the Archbishop of Canterbury to form a commission to provide "urgent and deep theological and legal reflection" to report back to the Primates in 12 months.

== Lambeth Commission on Communion ==
In 2003, Archbishop Robin Eames, the Anglican Primate of All Ireland, was appointed by the Archbishop of Canterbury as Chairman of the Lambeth Commission on Communion. This commission studied the state of unity in the Anglican Communion in light of the developments in the United States and Canada. The Commission published its findings, the Windsor Report, on 18 October 2004.

The report did not adopt a view on homosexual practice, but nevertheless recommended a moratorium on further consecrations of actively homosexual bishops and public Rites of Blessing of same-sex unions, and called for all involved in Robinson's consecration "to consider in all conscience whether they should withdraw themselves from representative functions in the Anglican Communion". However, it stopped short of recommending discipline against the Episcopal Church or the Anglican Church of Canada.

The report also recommended solidifying the connection between the churches of the Communion by having each church ratify an "Anglican Covenant" that would, in part, commit them to consulting the wider Communion when making major decisions. It also urged those who had contributed to disunity to express their regret.

== Aftermath ==
In February 2005, the issue of homosexuality was heavily discussed at a regular meeting of the Primates of the Anglican Communion at Dromantine in Northern Ireland. Of the 38 Primates, 35 attended. The Primates issued a communiqué that reiterated most of the Windsor Report's statements, with the addition that The Episcopal Church USA and Anglican Church of Canada were asked to voluntarily withdraw from the Anglican Consultative Council, the main formal international entity within the Anglican Communion until the next Lambeth Conference in 2008.

The Windsor Report was criticised by liberals, particularly in The Windsor Report: A Liberal Response, for seeming to take for granted that the actions of New Hampshire and New Westminster—and homosexuality in general—were wrong. For example, while it calls for both conservatives and liberals to apologise for disunity, it acknowledges that the conservatives may have acted out of a sense of duty. However, it concedes no such acknowledgement to New Westminster and New Hampshire.

On February 12, 2008 the Archbishop of Canterbury announced the formation of the Windsor Continuation Group (WCG). The WCG was formed to address the remaining questions around the Windsor Report and the various formal responses to the Windsor Report from the provinces and instruments of the Anglican Communion. The WCG was chaired by Bishop Clive Handford.

== Anglican Communion Covenant ==
In 2006, the Archbishop of Canterbury, Rowan Williams, established the Covenant Design Group (CDG) to draft a covenant for the Anglican Communion. The CDG met between 2007 and 2009, producing three successive drafts: the Nassau Draft Covenant (2007), the St. Andrews Draft Covenant (2008), and the Ridley Cambridge Draft Covenant (2009). Each draft was indebted to previous ecumenical covenants that Anglicans had either proposed or entered into. The origins of Anglican ecumenical covenants date to the 1964 British Conference on Faith and Order, although this was indebted to the ecumenical covenanting which the World Council of Churches endorsed in 1948. However, since the late 1960s, Anglicans have discussed and debated several plans for greater integration of the Anglican Communion. Most recently, these proposals have incorporated significant discussions of canon law. The Anglican Covenant depends upon these discussions as well.

The final text of the covenant was sent to the provinces of the Anglican Communion in late 2009. As of June 2012, the covenant has been acceded to by seven provinces of the Anglican Communion: Mexico (2010), the West Indies (2010), Ireland (2011), Myanmar (2011), South East Asia (2011), Papua New Guinea (2011), and the Southern Cone (2011). The Church of Southern Africa took the initial steps towards ratifying the covenant in 2011, pending final approval in 2013. Two provinces rejected the covenant: the Church of England (2012) and the Scottish Episcopal Church (2012). In the Church of England, the diocesan vote against the covenant was decisive but the popular vote was only narrowly against the covenant. It was expected that the Covenant would be brought up for reconsideration in the next triennium, but this did not take place.

Two provinces neither rejected nor embraced the covenant in full. On 9 July 2012, the General Synod of the Anglican Church in Aotearoa, New Zealand and Polynesia resolved that it was "unable to adopt the proposed Anglican Covenant due to concerns about aspects of Section 4, but subscribes to Sections 1, 2, and 3 as currently drafted to be a useful starting point for consideration of our Anglican understanding of the church." This resolution further stated that the General Synod of the Anglican Church in Aotearoa, New Zealand and Polynesia "Affirms the commitment of the Anglican Church in Aotearoa, New Zealand and Polynesia to the life of the Anglican Communion; including the roles and responsibilities of the four Instruments of Communion as they currently operate." Two days later, on 11 July 2012, the Episcopal Church in the United States of America chose to neither accept nor reject the Anglican Covenant, instead opting for a "pastoral response" that recognised the "wide variety of opinions and ecclesiological positions" within the province. The Episcopal Church voted to continue its participation in the Anglican Covenant process, monitoring and studying the text and its reception, throughout the Anglican Communion during the next three years.

== See also ==
- Global Anglican Future Conference
- Homosexuality and the Anglican Communion
- Integrity Toronto
- Integrity USA
- Lesbian and Gay Christian Movement
