= Holy Trinity Cathedral (New Westminster) =

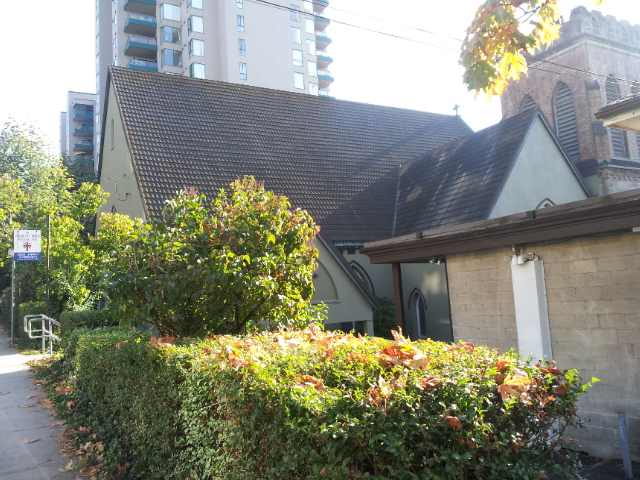
- Holy Trinity Cathedral
- 49.2045°N 122.9078°W
- Location: 514 Carnarvon Street, New Westminster, British Columbia
- Country: Canada
- Denomination: Anglican Church of Canada
- Website: holytrinitycathedral.ca

History
- Status: Parish church
- Founded: 1859
- Dedication: Trinity

Architecture
- Functional status: Active
- Architect: George W. Grant
- Groundbreaking: 1899
- Completed: 1902

Administration
- Province: British Columbia
- Diocese: New Westminster
- Parish: Holy Trinity

Clergy
- Rector: Rev. Stephanie Shepard

Holy Trinity Cathedral is a cathedral of the Anglican Diocese of New Westminster in New Westminster, British Columbia. The parish was established in 1859, with its current building completed in 1902. It is the second-oldest parish in the Diocese of New Westminster by six months, the oldest being Saint John's Maple Ridge.

== History ==
The parish of Holy Trinity Cathedral was established in 1859. In 1892, the cathedral was named as the first cathedral of the Anglican Diocese of New Westminster. In 1860 a wood-frame church was constructed on the current site. This church was destroyed by fire in 1865. A second church, built of stone, was built in 1867 and occupied roughly the same architectural footprint as the current building. This second church was the first to bear the title of 'Cathedral' and was destroyed in the 1898 fire that swept through what is now downtown New Westminster. The current building for Holy Trinity Cathedral was built from 1899 to 1902.

Holy Trinity has housed the regimental chapel for The Royal Westminster Regiment for 150 years. Prior to that time, the officers of the Royal Engineers attend Holy Trinity; enlisted men attended St. Mary the Virgin.

In 1929, the Archbishop of New Westminster formally named Christ Church Cathedral in Vancouver as the cathedral church of the diocese. Although Holy Trinity was no longer the cathedral church of the diocese, it was permitted to retain the word cathedral in its name.

== See also ==
- List of cathedrals in Canada
