= Cecil Swanson =

Canadian Anglican priest (1889–1984)

Cecil Beresford Swanson CM (24 February 1889 – 19 January 1984) was a Canadian Anglican priest.

Swanson was born in Clapham, educated at the University of Toronto and ordained in 1913. His first post was at Carmacks, Yukon after which he was the Incumbent at Whitehorse. He came to Lethbridge in 1922 and became its Archdeacon in 1926. In 1932 he was appointed Archdeacon of Calgary and in 1940 Dean of New Westminster. His last senior post was as Archdeacon of Toronto.

He was appointed a Member of the Order of Canada in 1978.
