= Godfrey Gower =

Canadian Anglican bishop

Godfrey Philip Gower was the fifth Bishop of New Westminster and Metropolitan of British Columbia.
He was born on 5 December 1899, educated at Imperial College, London and St. John's College, University of Manitoba and ordained in 1931. He then held incumbencies in Camrose, Edmonton and Vancouver. He was elected Bishop of New Westminster in 1951 and Metropolitan of British Columbia in 1968, retiring from both posts in 1971. He died on 23 August 1992.

== Notes ==
Anglican Communion titles
Preceded by Sir Francis Heathcote	Bishop of New Westminster; 1951–1971	Succeeded by David Somerville
Preceded by Harold Sexton	Metropolitan of British Columbia; 1968 –1971	Succeeded by Ralph Dean
