= William Anderson (bishop of Caledonia) =

Canadian Anglican bishop

- Born: 1950 (age 75–76)
- Occupation: Anglican bishop

William John Anderson (born 1950) is a Canadian Anglican bishop. He was bishop of the Diocese of Caledonia in the Anglican Church of Canada from 2001 until his retirement on December 31, 2016. He was educated at the University of Windsor.

He announced that he was leaving the Anglican Church of Canada to join the Anglican Network in Canada, a diocese of the Anglican Church in North America, on 16 November 2017, in protest against the way his successor, Jacob Worley, was dismissed after his election by the diocese, because of his former association with the Anglican Mission in the Americas. Anderson will be a retired bishop of the ANiC, living in Terrace, British Columbia, despite his new denomination not having a church there.

Anglican Communion titles
Preceded by John Hannen	Bishop of Caledonia; 2001 – December 31, 2016	Succeeded by David Lehmann
