= Dyson Hague =

Canadian evangelical Anglican presbyter, author and lecturer

Dyson Hague (1857–1935) was a Canadian evangelical Anglican presbyter, author, and lecturer.

== Early life and education ==
Hague was born in Toronto in April 1857 to Sarah Cousins and George Hague. He was educated at Upper Canada College before earning his B.A. (1880) and M.A. (1881) at University College and his D.D. at Wycliffe College. He was ordained as a priest in 1883, and married Jemima May (née Baldwin) in 1884.

== Career ==
Hague was appointed first rector of St Paul's Church in Brockville, Ontario in 1885, before serving as seventh rector of St Paul's Church in Halifax, Nova Scotia from 1890 to 1897. From 1903 to 1912, he served as rector of Bishop Cronyn Memorial Church in London, Ontario. Hague later served as rector of the Church of the Epiphany and professor of liturgics and ecclesiology at Wycliffe College in Toronto.

== Selected works ==
=== Books ===
- Hague, Dyson (1890). The Protestantism of the Prayer Book. Toronto: J. E. Bryant Co. OCLC 20307106.
- ——— (1892). The Church of England, the Centre of Unity: plea for union, addressed to churchmen and an enquiry into the causes why the Church of England has failed to be the unifier, with a suggestion as to the way of success. Halifax, NS: Morton. ISBN 978-0-665-08196-5. OCLC 8892996.
- ——— (1896). Ways to Win: Thoughts and Suggestions with Regard to Personal Work for Christ. London: Marshall Bros. ISBN 978-0-837-06189-4. OCLC 18331206.
- ——— (1897). The Church of England before the Reformation. London: Hodder and Stoughton. OCLC 3623134.
- ——— (1900). The Wonder of the Book. Toronto: Haynes Press. ISBN 978-0-665-74404-4. OCLC 53675631.
- ——— (1903). Confirmation: why we have it, what it means, what it requires. Toronto: Musson. ISBN 978-0-665-86194-9. OCLC 53690939.
- ——— (1926). The Story of the English Book of Common Prayer: its origin and developments : with special chapters on the Scottish, Irish, American and Canadian prayer books. London: Longmans, Green and Co. OCLC 947006.
- ——— (1932). Through the Prayer Book: an exposition of its teaching and language: the origins and contents of its services: with special reference to the more recent features of the Canadian prayer book. London; New York: Longmans, Green and Co. OCLC 3676800.
- ——— (1935). The Life and Work of John Wycliffe. London: Church Book Room. OCLC 1049750.

=== Other publications ===
Among his many publications, Hague was a major contributor to The Fundamentals, which included his essays on higher criticism, atonement by propitiation, and the doctrinal value of the first chapters of the Book of Genesis.

- 'The Atonement: A Historical and Theological Study' (1912)
- 'Who are the Higher Critics and what is the Higher Criticism?' (1905)
- 'Jonah: The Book and the Man' (1910)
- 'The Wonder of the Book' (1912)
