= Diocese of Caledonia =

Diocese of the Anglican Church in Canada

Location
- Ecclesiastical province: British Columbia and Yukon

Statistics
- Parishes: 20 (2022)
- Members: 1,048 (2022)

Information
- Rite: Anglican
- Cathedral: St. Andrew's Cathedral, Prince Rupert

Current leadership
- Bishop: David Lehmann

Map
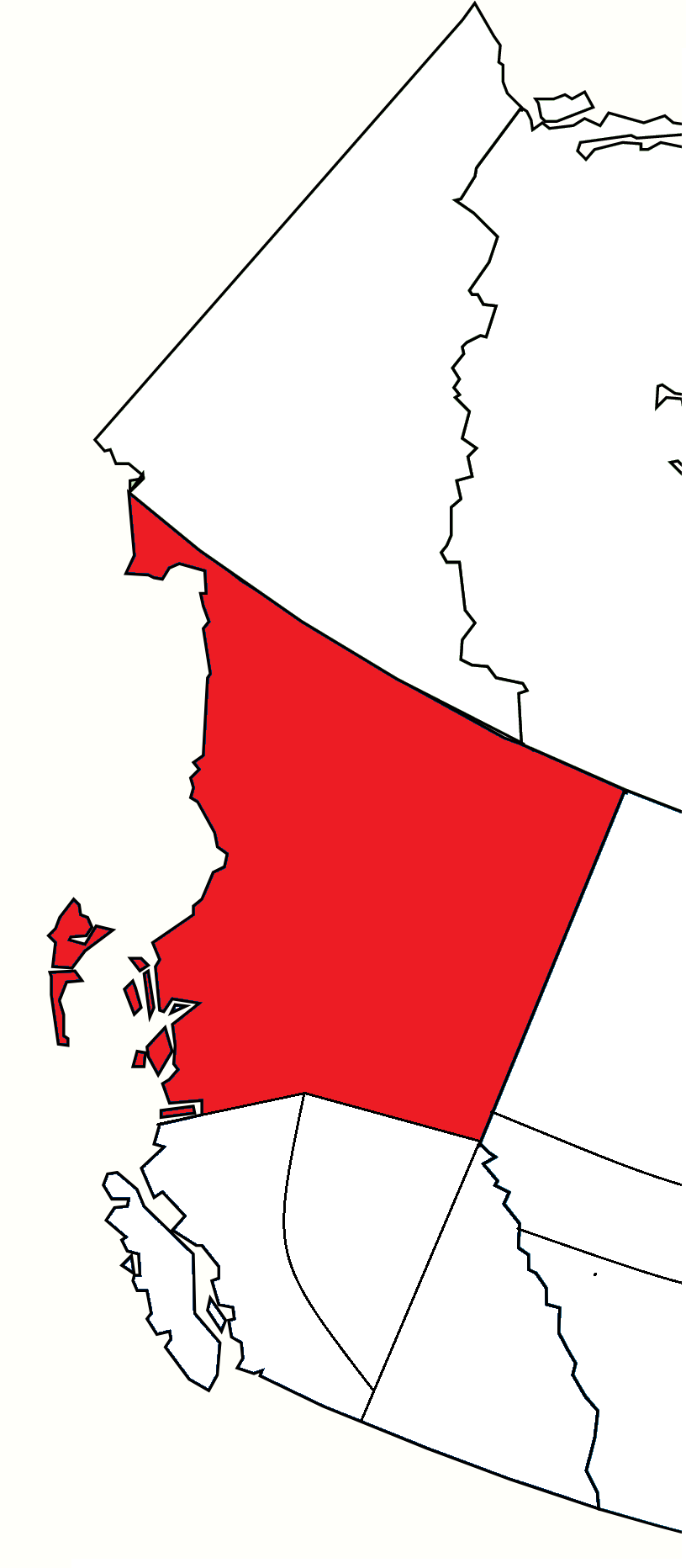
- Location of the diocese within the Ecclesiastical Province of British Columbia and Yukon.

Website
- caledonia.anglican.org

The Diocese of Caledonia is a diocese of the Ecclesiastical Province of British Columbia and Yukon of the Anglican Church of Canada.

Early missionary leaders who served in this diocese include William Ridley and James Benjamin McCullagh.

In 1977 the diocese published The Nishga Liturgy for Nisga'a Anglicans.

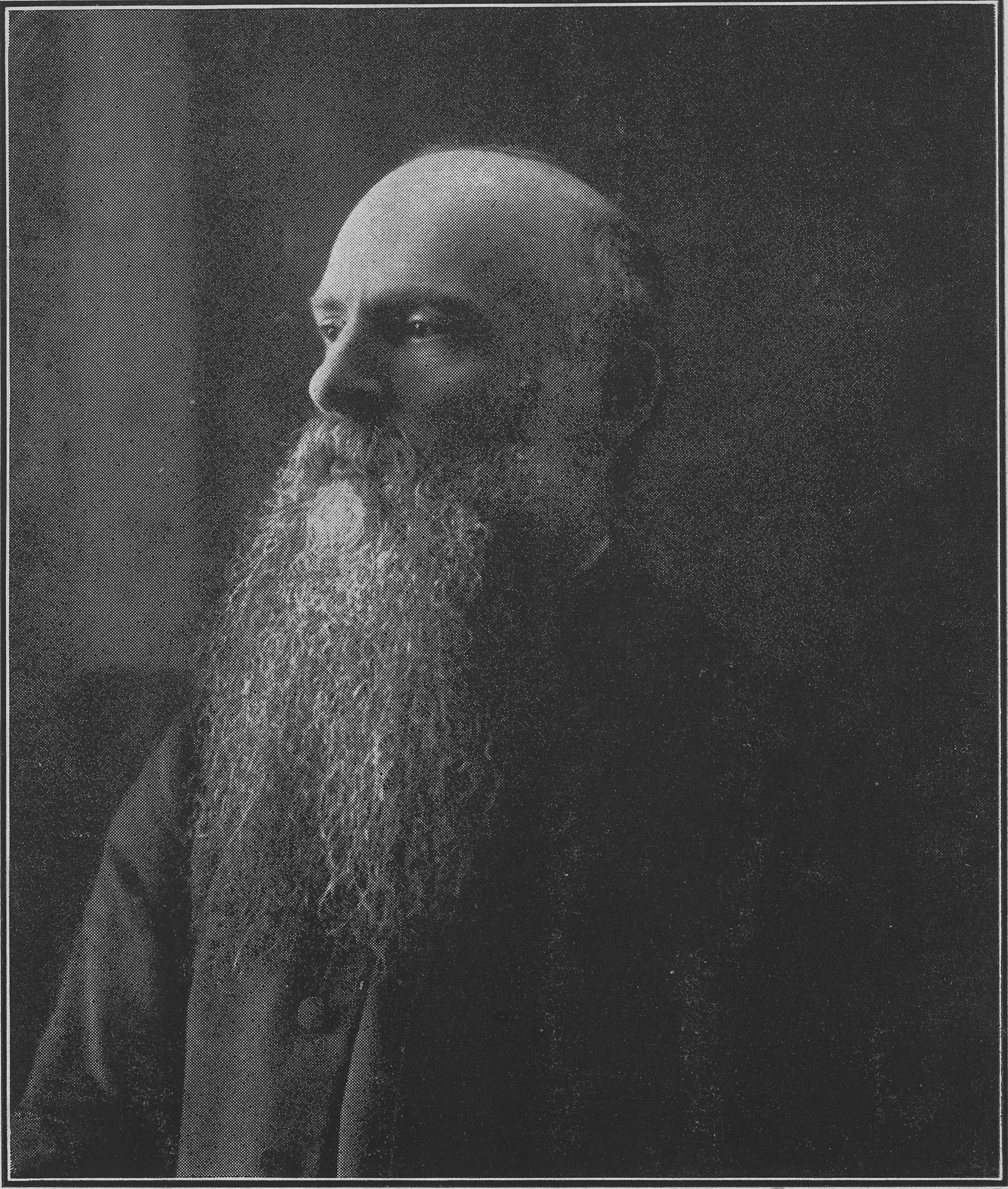
Bishop William Ridley

== Bishops of Caledonia ==
No.	Name	Dates	Notes
1	William Ridley	1879?–1904	
2	Frederick Du Vernet	1904–1924	1st Metropolitan of British Columbia and Archbishop of Caledonia, 1915–1924
3	George Rix	1928–1945	
4	James Gibson	1945–1952	
5	Horace Watts	1953–1959	
6	Eric Munn	1959–1968	
7	Douglas Hambidge	1969–1980	afterwards Bishop of New Westminster, 1980–1993
8	John Hannen	1981–2001	Acting Metropolitan of British Columbia, 1993–1994
9	William Anderson	2001–2016	Retired Bishop of Caledonia on Dec. 31, 2016
10	David Lehmann	2017–present	Elected October 22, 2017, Enthroned January 18, 2018

== Deans of Caledonia ==
The Dean of Caledonia is also usually Rector of St Andrew's Cathedral, Prince Rupert.

- 1929–1945: James B. Gibson (1st Dean) Bishop of Caledonia, 1945
- 1945–: Basil S. Prockter (interesting archival note from Crockford's Clerical directory suggests that Bishop Gibson continued as Dean after his election, and that Basil Prockter was never listed as anything but "Canon", though he was the rector of the parish)
- 1956–1959: Albert Edward Hendy
- 1959–1963: George Tweddale Pattison
- 1964–1970: Ernest Geoffrey Flagg
- 1979–1985: Robert Gary Paterson
- 1986–1993: Michael John Wimmer
- 1994–1997: Glen Raymond Burgomaster
- 1998–1999: [Vacant]
- 2000–2002: Hugo T. Jackson
- 2002–2003: Acting Dean – Peter Davison
- 2004–2008: Rob Sweet
- 2009: [Vacant]
- 2010–2011: James Barlow
- 2011–2017: Jason Haggstrom
- 2018–2024: Stephen Paul Williams (installed as Incumbent 17 June 2018)
- 2024-present: Emma Vickery
