= Jakob Jocz =

Lithuanian-Canadian Anglican priest and theologian (1906–1983)

The Reverend Jakób Jocz
- Born: 1906; Vilnius, Lithuania
- Died: 1983 (aged 76–77)
- Spouse: Joan Celia Gapp (m. 1935)

Ecclesiastical career
- Religion: Christianity (Anglican)
- Church: Church of England; Anglican Church of Canada

Academic background
- Education: St Aidan's College, Birkenhead; University of Edinburgh
- Thesis: A Study in the Relationship Between the Jewish People and Jesus Christ (1945)

Academic work
- Discipline: Theology
- Sub-discipline: Systematic theology
- Institutions: Wycliffe College, Toronto
- Notable works: The Jewish People and Jesus Christ (1949); A Theology of Election (1958)

Jakób Jocz (1906–1983) was born in Vilnius, Lithuania, and studied in Germany, England, and Scotland. He received his Ph.D. and D.Litt. from the University of Edinburgh in 1945 and 1957 respectively. He contributed to many professional journals and wrote four other books of Old Testament study and systematic theology. Jocz was ordained in the Anglican Church, and served for many years as Professor of Systematic Theology at Wycliffe College, Toronto.

As a third-generation Hebrew Christian he was passionately interested in evangelism amongst Jews. However he also saw the need for a place of dialogue and sought to get the two communities to understand their past and get past the stereotypes.

Jocz most notable works are The Jewish People and Jesus Christ written in 1949 and on the distinctive nature of Israel and Church before God in his 1958 work A Theology of Election: Israel and the Church. He turned his attention in 1968 to the future destinies of both groups in his often reprinted The Covenant: A Theology of Human Destiny.

== Works ==
His major works are as follows:

- Jocz, Jakób (1949). The Jewish People and Jesus Christ. London: SPCK.
- ——— (1958). A Theology of Election: Israel and the Church. London: SPCK.
- ——— (1961). The Spiritual History of Israel. London: Eyre and Spottiswoode.
- ——— (1966). Christians and Jews: Encounter and Mission. London: SPCK.
- ——— (1968). The Covenant: A Theology of Human Destiny. Grand Rapids, MI: Eerdmans. OCLC 218201.
- ——— (1981). The Jewish People and Jesus Christ After Auschwitz: a study in the controversy between church and synagogue. Grand Rapids, MI: Baker Book House. ISBN 978-0-801-05123-4. OCLC 7670435.
