= Northcote Burke =

Canadian Anglican priest (fl. 1927–1968)

Northcote Richard Burke (fl. 1927–1968) was Dean of New Westminster from 1953 to 1968.

Burke was educated at the Queen's University, Kingston and ordained in 1927. After curacies at Pittsburgh, Ontario, then Kingston, Ontario he was the Rector of St John, Ottawa from 1937 to 1948; and then of Christ Church, Deer Park until his appointment as Dean.
