= David Lehmann =

Canadian Anglican bishop

The Right Reverend David Lehmann D.D.
- Bishop of Caledonia
- Church: Anglican Church of Canada
- Province: British Columbia and Yukon
- Diocese: Caledonia
- In office: Since 2018
- Predecessor: William Anderson

Orders
- Ordination: May 22, 1994 (diaconate); March 26, 1995 (priesthood) by Chris Williams
- Consecration: January 18, 2018 by John Privett

Personal details
- Born: Toronto, Ontario, Canada
- Education: Camrose Lutheran College (B.A.); Wycliffe College, Toronto (M.Div.); Trinity Anglican Seminary (D.Min.)
- Military service
- Branch: Canadian Forces Naval Reserve
- Service years: 1991–2010

David Thomas James Lehmann is a Canadian Anglican bishop. Since 2018, he has been bishop of Caledonia in northern British Columbia.

== Early life and education ==
Lehmann was born in Toronto and raised in Fort Smith, Northwest Territories, where his parents moved for work. He was educated at Camrose Lutheran College in Alberta, where he graduated in 1990 with a B.A. in history. He went to seminary at Wycliffe College in Toronto. In 1991, Lehmann entered the Canadian Forces Naval Reserve, serving until 2010 in chaplaincy ministry.

== Ordained ministry ==
Lehmann was ordained to the diaconate in 1994 and the priesthood in 1995 in the Diocese of The Arctic, where he was incumbent in Fort Simpson from 1994 to 2000. He was then a rector in a multipoint parish in Alberta from 2000 to 2005 and of the church in Fort Saskatchewan, both in the Diocese of Edmonton. He returned to Fort Smith as rector of the Anglican church there from 2012 to 2018. In addition to his parish ministry, Lehmann was a regional dean in both dioceses, a chaplain for local police and fire department units, and a leader in cultural organizations, including chairing the board of the Northern Life Museum and Cultural Centre the serving on the board of governors of the National Trust for Canada. He was also involved in bringing Messy Church to the Diocese of the Arctic.

=== Episcopacy ===
In October 2017, Lehmann was elected bishop of Caledonia on the 20th ballot. His election followed a contentious period in the diocese, which had elected Jacob Worley as bishop in 2017 to succeed the retired William Anderson. However, the Ecclesiastical Province of British Columbia and Yukon bishops refused to grant consent to Worley's election due to his prior involvement with Anglican realignment groups in the United States. At the time of his election, Lehmann identified his churchmanship as broad and his theology as "lean[ing] toward conservative evangelical." He was opposed to same-sex marriage in the Anglican Church of Canada.

Lehmann was consecrated to the episcopacy on January 18, 2018, at St. Andrew's Cathedral in Prince Rupert. During his episcopacy, he has been chairman of the Council of the North (a group of smaller and remote dioceses in Canada that receive assistance from the General Synod, a member of the Council of General Synod and chairman of the board of governors of Vancouver School of Theology. Lehmann was a candidate to serve as Primate of the Anglican Church of Canada in the June 2025 election by the General Synod; Shane Parker was elected.

== Personal life ==
During his episcopacy, Lehmann completed a doctorate of ministry at Trinity Anglican Seminary. He is unmarried.

Anglican Communion titles
Preceded by William Anderson	Bishop of Caledonia; Since 2018	Incumbent
Preceded by William Cliff	Chair of the Council of the North; Since 2021	Incumbent
