= David Somerville (bishop) =

Canadian Anglican bishop

The Most Reverend David Somerville OBE
- Metropolitan of British Columbia and Archbishop of New Westminster
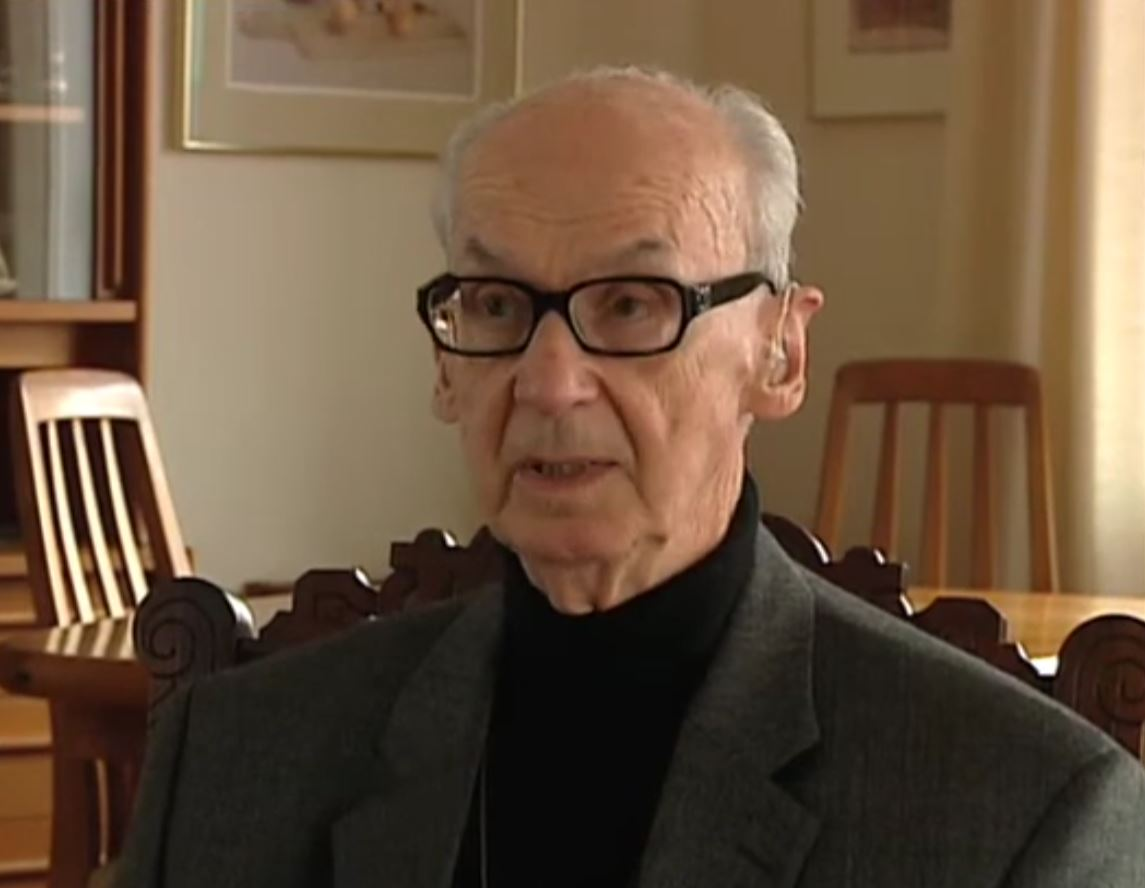
- Church: Anglican Church of Canada
- Province: British Columbia
- Diocese: New Westminster
- In office: 1971–1980
- Predecessor: John Timothy Frame (as metropolitan); Godfrey Gower (as bishop)
- Successor: Douglas Walter Hambidge
- Previous post(s): Bishop of New Westminster, 1971–1975

Orders
- Ordination: 1939 (diaconate); 1940 (priesthood)
- Consecration: 1969

Personal details
- Born: November 11, 1915
- Died: July 25, 2011 (aged 95)

Thomas David Somerville (November 11, 1915 – July 25, 2011) was the sixth Bishop of New Westminster and eighth Metropolitan of British Columbia.

Somerville was born in Ashcroft, British Columbia and educated at the King George Secondary School and the University of British Columbia in Vancouver. Ordained in 1939, he had incumbencies in Princeton, Sardis and Vancouver. He was Dean of Residence at the Anglican Theological College of British Columbia then Coadjutor Bishop of New Westminster and then its diocesan and Metropolitan of British Columbia from 1975, retiring from both positions in 1980.

Anglican Communion titles
Preceded by Godfrey Gower	Bishop of New Westminster; 1971–1980	Succeeded by Douglas Walter Hambidge
Preceded by John Timothy Frame	Metropolitan of British Columbia; 1975 – 1980	Succeeded by Douglas Walter Hambidge
