= Francis Heathcote =

Canadian Anglican bishop

Sir Francis Cooke Caulfeild Heathcote, 9th Baronet (1868–1961) was an Anglican cleric, and 4th Bishop of New Westminster.

He was born in Northamptonshire, England and educated at Lancing College, Sussex before emigrating to Canada in 1882. He studied at Trinity College, Toronto, and was ordained in 1891. He was appointed Archdeacon of Columbia in 1913 (which was changed to Archdeacon of Vancouver in 1924. He succeeded the Most Reverend Adam de Pencier as Bishop of New Westminster of the Anglican Church of Canada, located in the Lower Mainland of British Columbia, on 25 January 1941.

He died in 1961 at the age of 93.

Anglican Communion titles
Preceded by Adam de Pencier	Bishop of New Westminster; 1941– 1950	Succeeded by Godfrey Gower
Baronetage of Great Britain
Preceded by Gilbert Redvers Heathcote	Baronet (of Hursley); 1937 – 1961	Succeeded by Leonard Vyvyan Heathcote
