= John Dart (bishop) =

Canadian Anglican bishop

John Dart (1837–1910) was the second Bishop of New Westminster. Dart was educated at St Mary Hall, Oxford and ordained in 1861. During his career he was Vice-Principal and Science Lecturer at St Peter's College, Peterborough; Warden of St Thomas's College, Colombo; President of the University of Windsor; and a Canon of Halifax Cathedral.

Church of England titles
| Preceded by Acton Sillitoe | Bishop of New Westminster; 1895–1910 | Succeeded by Adam de Pencier |
