= Jim Cruickshank (bishop) =

Anglican bishop (1936–2015)

James David Cruickshank (born 10 June 1936; died 30 December 2015) was bishop of Cariboo from 1992 to 2001.

Cruickshank was educated at the University of Minnesota and ordained in 1963. He served in the Robson Valley area until 1965 when he became director of the Anglican Lay Training Centre at Sorrento. In 1983 he became dean of New Westminster, a post he held until his election as Bishop of Cariboo.
