= James Gibson (bishop) =

Canadian Anglican bishop

James Byers Gibson (31 January 1881 – 25 July 1952) was the fourth Anglican Bishop of Caledonia in Canada.

Gibson was educated at Emmanuel College, Saskatoon and ordained in 1911. He held incumbencies at St Cuthbert's Perdue, Saskatchewan, St John's Lloydminster, Christ Church, Anyox, British Columbia and St James's Smithers, British Columbia before becoming Dean of Caledonia in 1928, a position he held until his ordination to the episcopate.

Church of England titles
Preceded by George Alexander Rix	Bishop of Caledonia; 1945– 1952	Succeeded by Horace Godfrey Watts
