= Adam de Pencier =

Canadian Anglican bishop

The Most Reverend Adam de Pencier OBE
- Metropolitan of British Columbia and Archbishop of New Westminster
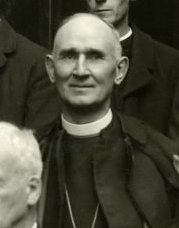
- De Pencier circa 1924
- Church: Anglican Church of Canada
- Province: British Columbia
- Diocese: New Westminster
- In office: 1925–1940
- Predecessor: Frederick Du Vernet (as metropolitan); John Dart (as bishop)
- Successor: Walter Adams (as metropolitan); Francis Heathcote (as bishop)
- Previous post(s): Bishop of New Westminster, 1910–1925

Orders
- Ordination: 1890
- Consecration: 1910

Personal details
- Born: 1866
- Died: 1949 (aged 82–83)
- Education: Trinity College, Toronto

Adam Urias de Pencier OBE (1866-1949) was the third Bishop of New Westminster and second Archbishop and Metropolitan of British Columbia.

Born in 1866, he was the great-great grandson of Charles I, Duke of Brunswick-Wolfenbüttel through his ancestor Christian Theodor von Pincier. He was educated at Trinity College in Toronto.

De Prencier was ordained in 1890. He held incumbencies at St Matthew's, Brandon and St Paul's, Vancouver. He was appointed Bishop, and later Archbishop of the Diocese of New Westminster in 1910 for British Columbia. While serving as bishop, he founded St. John's Shaughnessy on the grounds of the bishop's residence. Prior to retiring in 1940, he was awarded an Honorary Doctor of Laws by the University of British Columbia and the Order of the British Empire by King George V.

Church of England titles
Preceded by John Dart	Bishop of New Westminster; 1910– 1940	Succeeded by Sir Francis Heathcote, 9th Baronet
Preceded by Frederick Herbert Du Vernet	Metropolitan of British Columbia; 1925 – 1940	Succeeded by Walter Robert Adams
