= Peter Elliott (Canadian priest) =

Anglican priest (born 1954)

The Very Reverend Peter Elliott
- Dean of New Westminster
- Elliott preaching at an induction in 2012
- Church: Anglican Church of Canada
- Province: British Columbia and Yukon
- Diocese: New Westminster
- In office: 1994–2019
- Predecessor: Michael Ingham
- Successor: Christopher Pappas

Orders
- Ordination: 1981 (priest)

Personal details
- Born: May 19, 1954 (age 72) St. Catharines, Ontario, Canada
- Spouse: Thomas Roach (m. 2009)
- Education: Trent University

Peter Elliott (born 19 May 1954 in St. Catharines, Ontario) is a Canadian priest. He is the former (retired) rector of Christ Church Cathedral and Dean of New Westminster in the Anglican Church of Canada. Elliott grew up in St. Catharines, Ontario. In 1976 he received a Bachelor of Arts degree in English literature and philosophy from Trent University in Peterborough, Ontario. Subsequently, he attended and graduated from the Episcopal Divinity School in Cambridge, Massachusetts. In 1981 he was ordained a priest in the Diocese of Niagara. Prior to coming to Vancouver he was Director of Ministries in Church and Society with the Anglican Church of Canada. In 1994, Elliott was made rector of Christ Church Cathedral and Dean of New Westminster. He retired in October 2019 after 25 years.

== Career ==
From 1995 to 2005, Elliott led the initiatives to restore and renew the building of Christ Church Cathedral. This program of exterior and interior renovation, including the installation of a new tracker action pipe organ, cost $12 million. The restoration of the cathedral won awards from the City of Vancouver and the national heritage foundation.

From 1998 to 2001, Elliott served as an officer of the General Synod of the Anglican Church of Canada and was elected for a second term as a member of the Council of General Synod and chair of its Planning and Agenda Team. In 2003 he was elected Deputy Prolocutor of the General Synod and at the General Synod in St. Catharines in 2004 and 2007, Elliott was elected Prolocutor of the General Synod.

From 2000 to 2002 Elliott chaired a task force on negotiating a settlement concerning native residential schools.

The Diocese of New Westminster was cited in the Windsor Report and the Anglican Communion Primates' Meeting over the issue of the blessing of same-sex unions. In his position as Prolocutor, Elliott was the highest-ranking openly gay cleric in the Anglican Church of Canada. In 2005, he made an official presentation to the Anglican Consultative Council in Nottingham, England.

I come to this issue as a man who is a Christian, ordained for 25 years, a gay man, in a committed relationship myself. I come to this meeting with the support of my partner Thomas, my family, my parish, my bishop, my diocese. And I have brought with me the very first Bible I received when I was just 4 years old. In it, in my handwriting, are the words, "Today I gave Jesus my life." It's dated March 29, 1962. I was eight years old.

Elliott has served on the board of directors of the Vancouver International Film Festival. He has reviewed movies for the Anglican Journal - the national newspaper of the Anglican Church of Canada and for the newspaper of the Anglican Church of Australia. In 1999, his film reviews received an award of excellence from the Associated Church Press.

Elliott has been involved with the popular CBC readings of A Christmas Carol from their inception. His sister-in-law, Judy Maddren, is the CBC radio announcer who began the readings in 1990 in Toronto. In Vancouver, Christ Church Cathedral has held the popular readings during most Advent seasons since 1995.

In 2009 he and his long-time partner, Thomas Roach, were married in a civil ceremony.

In 2009 the Vancouver School of Theology awarded Elliott the degree of Doctor of Divinity (honoris causa); in 2011 he was elected as chancellor of the Vancouver School of Theology.

In 2012 he represented the Canadian church at the Anglican Consultative Council in Auckland, New Zealand.

Following the retirement of the diocesan bishop, Michael Ingham, and the see being vacant, on 31 August 2013, Elliott, as Dean of New Westminster became administrator of the diocese. He continued as administrator until the ordination and installation of the next bishop, Melissa M. Skelton, on 1 March 2014.

On 7 September 2014, there was special tribute in words and music paid to Elliott by the Christ Church Cathedral community in honour of his 20th anniversary as rector of the cathedral and dean of the diocese. Diocesan Communications Officer and Canadian musician Randy Murray participated in the tribute performance.

From 2015, through to the dedication of the new bell tower 17 November 2016, Elliott with Christ Church Cathedral leadership embarked on a program to replace the building's roof, build a full scale commercial grade kitchen that would be fully staffed to serve community meals on weekdays, build a bell tower on the Cathedral's property footprint and have four bells created for that tower. The "Raise the Roof, Ring the Bells, Feed the Hungry" campaign was successfully funded and completed. LINK

From April through July 2018, Elliott went on sabbatical in part to work out plans for his retirement from his ministry at Christ Church Cathedral and the Diocese of New Westminster.

On 9 September 2018, Elliott announced that he would be retiring as dean and rector of Christ Church Cathedral as of 30 September 2019.

Elliott was appointed Interim Director of Anglican Formation at Vancouver School of Theology on January 1, 2022 for the spring term in addition to his role as sessional instructor.

Currently Adjunct Faculty at Vancouver School of Theology, Peter also has a private practice through Elliott Resource Services, Pacific as a consultant and coach. He’s a featured writer on the arts and culture in the national newspaper of the Anglican Church of Canada–the Anglican Journal, and co-hosts, with Dean Nathan LeRud the popular podcast The Gospel and Musical Theatre produced through Trinity Episcopal Cathedral in Portland, Oregon.

== Awards ==
In February 2013, Elliott was awarded the Queen's Diamond Jubilee Medal by Premier Christy Clark of British Columbia.
