= Onishi, Gunma =

Dissolved municipality in Gunma prefecture, Japan

Onishi (鬼石町, Onishi-machi) was a town located in Tano District, Gunma Prefecture, Japan.

On January 1, 2006, Onishi was merged into the expanded city of Fujioka.

As of 2005, the town had an estimated population of 7,011 and a density of 133.7 persons per km^{2}. The total area was 52.45 km^{2}.

The town hosts the Onishi Summer Music Festival the second weekend of July where five Portable Dashi shrines representing each neighborhood parade through the town. Approximately 10 musicians riding the Dashi play flutes and a combinations of Taiko Drums. The festival is based on Kyoto's Gion Matsuri.
