= Acton Sillitoe =

Canadian Anglican bishop

Acton Windeyer Sillitoe (also Wyndeyer; 12 July 1840 – 9 June 1894) was the first Bishop of New Westminster.

Sillitoe was born in Sydney and educated at Pembroke College, Cambridge and ordained in the Church of England: he was made deacon on 21 February 1869 by George Selwyn (Bishop of Lichfield) at St Peter's Church, Wolverhampton and ordained priest by Selwyn in 1870. After curacies at Brierley Hill and Wolverhampton he was the incumbent at Ellenbrook from 1873 to 1876. After this he was a chaplain at Geneva then Darmstadt. He was consecrated a bishop 1 November 1879 by Archibald Campbell Tait, Archbishop of Canterbury at Croydon Parish Church and went to British Columbia (Canada) to serve as the first Bishop of New Westminster; he also became a Doctor of Divinity (DD).

Church of England titles
New title	Bishop of New Westminster; 1879–1894	Succeeded by John Dart
