= Eric Munn =

Canadian Anglican bishop

Eric George Munn was the sixth Bishop of Caledonia.

He was born 8 March 1903, educated at University of Leeds and ordained in 1930 after studying at the College of the Resurrection, Mirfield. After a curacy at Wigan he was a missionary at Quesnel and the Lytton, British Columbia. He was at St James' Vancouver from 1936 to 1942; and had incumbencies at Fernie and Victoria. His last position before his ordination to the episcopate in 1959 was as the Archdeacon of Lytton. He died in post on 26 December 1968.

Church of England titles
| Preceded by Horace Godfrey Watts | Bishop of Caledonia; 1959– 1968 | Succeeded by Douglas Walter Hambidge |
