= Wycliffe College, Toronto =

Federated college of the University of Toronto

Wycliffe College
- Federated college
- University of Toronto
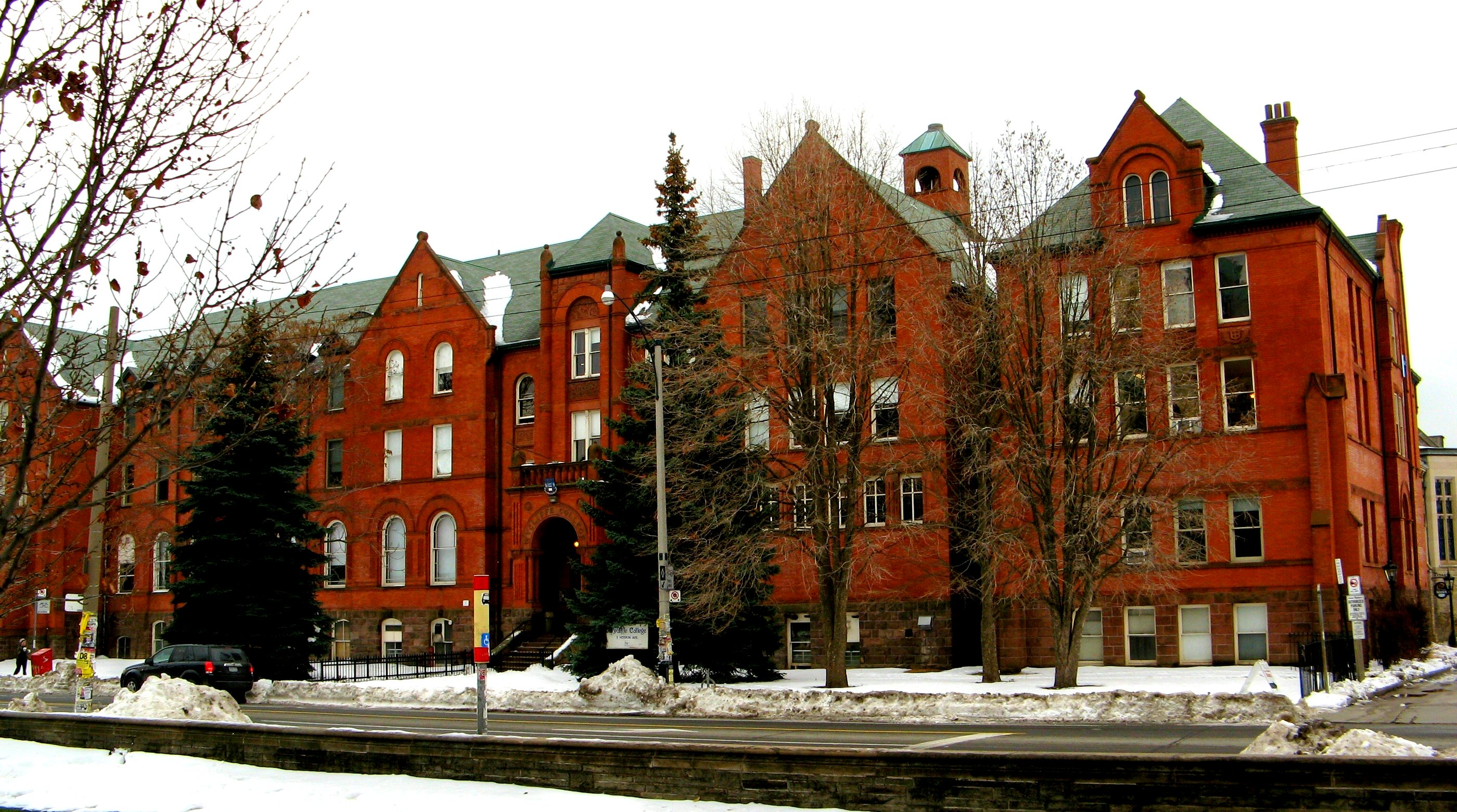

- Arms: Azure on a fess Argent between in chief a maple leaf between two cross-crosslets Or and in base an open book proper bound Gules edged and irradiated Or, a key surmounting a pastoral staff in saltire Azure.
- Location: 5 Hoskin Avenue, Toronto, Ontario, Canada
- Coordinates: 43°39′52″N 79°23′42″W
- Motto: Verbum Domini manet (Latin)
- Motto in English: "The word of the Lord endureth"
- Established: 1877; 149 years ago
- Named for: John Wycliffe
- Affiliation: Anglican Church of Canada; TST; ATS
- Website: www.wycliffecollege.ca

Ontario Heritage Act
- Criteria: Designated Part IV
- Designated: Jan 17, 1977

Wycliffe College (/ˈwɪklɪf/) is a federated college of the University of Toronto which serves as its evangelical graduate college of theology. It is located on the St. George campus in Toronto, Ontario, Canada. Founded in 1877 as an evangelical seminary in the Anglican tradition, Wycliffe College today attracts students from many Christian denominations from around the world. As a founding member of the Toronto School of Theology, students can avail themselves of the wide range of courses from Canada's largest ecumenical consortium. Wycliffe College trains those pursuing ministry in the church and in the world, as well as those preparing for academic careers of scholarship and teaching.

== History ==
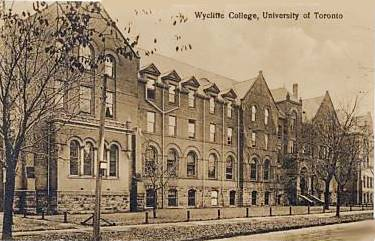
Old postcard depicting Wycliffe College

In response to the Liberal Catholic perspective of Trinity College, which is the Toronto diocesan seminary, the Church Association of the Diocese of Toronto, a lay evangelical group at the Cathedral Church of St. James, founded the independent Protestant Episcopal Divinity School in 1877 to provide an alternative source for evangelical and low-church theological training. Like its Oxford counterpart, Wycliffe Hall, the name Wycliffe College was inspired by John Wycliffe, a 14th-century English scholastic philosopher, theologian, biblical translator, and reformer. The name was given first to the college's building and then to the college itself. To ensure its long-term viability, Wycliffe College began considering various forms of union with the University of Toronto towards the end of the 19th century. Wycliffe College became affiliated with the University of Toronto in 1885 and federated in 1889.

Wycliffe College had a close association with the Anglican Church of the Epiphany in Parkdale. The church's founding rector, Bernard Bryan, had been one of the nine men who constituted the first class at Wycliffe in 1877. This connection continued in 1959 when the Church of the Epiphany's rector, Leslie Hunt, was appointed Principal of Wycliffe College.

George Martel Miller (architect) designed Convocation Hall, 1902. Henry Bauld Gordon (architect) designed the Dining Hall and Dormitory Wing, 1907; Principal's Residence and new Chapel, 1911.

William Faulkner billeted at Wycliffe College while a student at the School of Aeronautics in 1918.

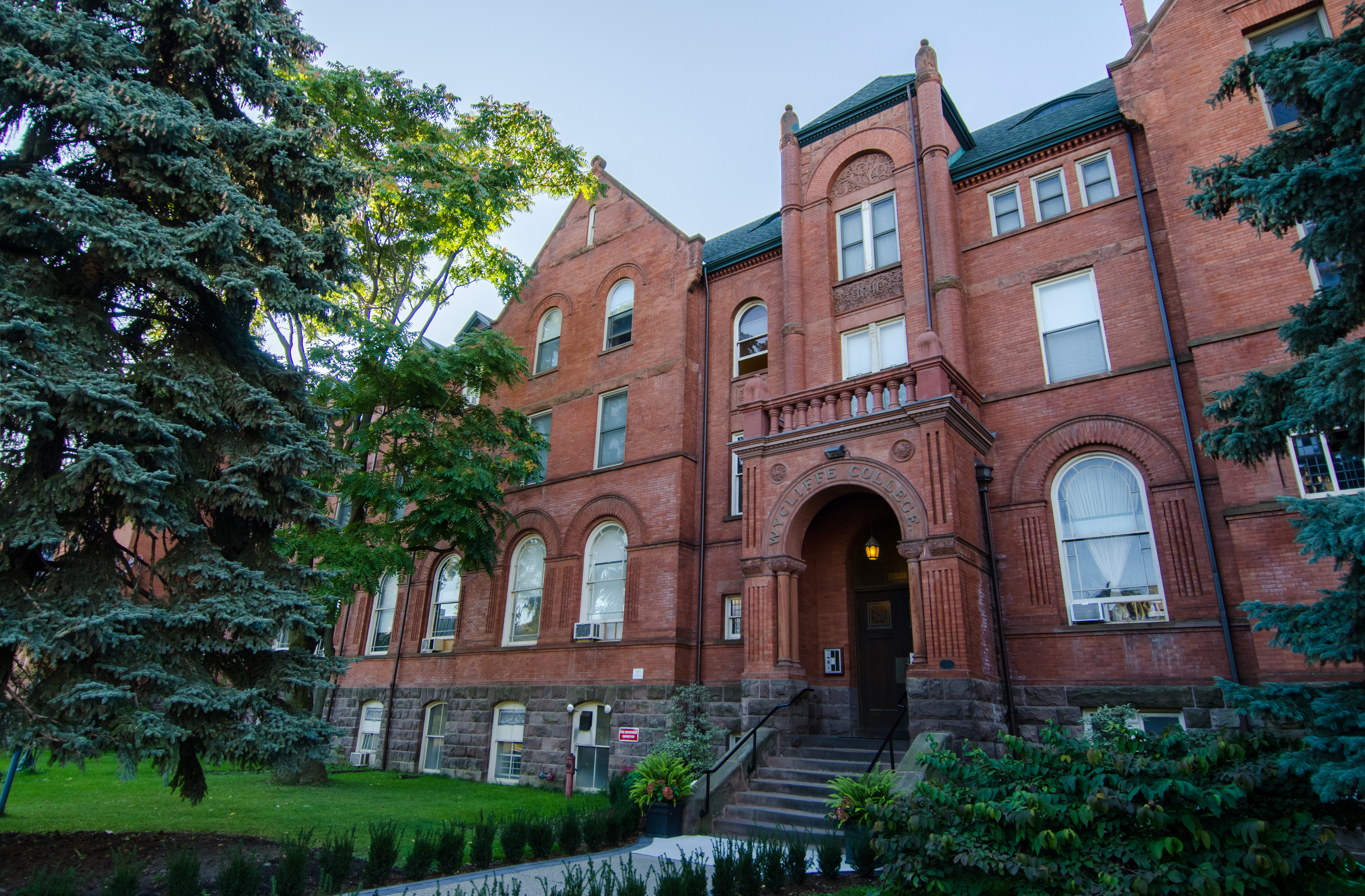
Main college building

In 1969, the Toronto School of Theology (TST) was created as an independent federation of seven schools of theology, including the divinity faculties of Wycliffe College. Within its own federation, the University of Toronto granted degrees except theology or divinity degrees. Since 1978, by virtue of a change made in its charter, the University of Toronto has granted theology degrees conjointly with Wycliffe College and other TST member institutions.

An act respecting Wycliffe College, being chapter 112 of the Statutes of Ontario, 1916, was repealed and the Wycliffe College Act, 2002 was substituted. Wycliffe College's arms were registered with the Canadian Heraldic Authority on March 15, 2007.

The Wycliffe College Chapel sanctuary features several stained glass windows, including "Our Lord", "St. Paul", "St. John", and "Timothy" by Robert McCausland Limited.

== Campus ==
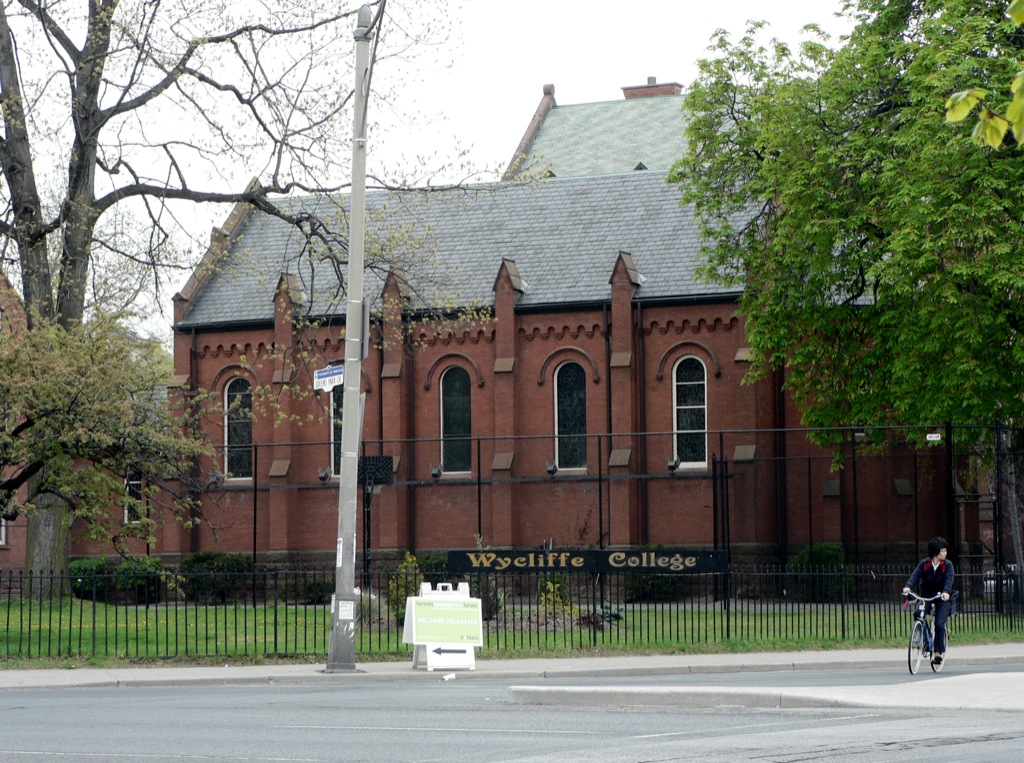
East wing of Wycliffe College, seen from the edge of Queen's Park

Wycliffe College is situated in the centre of the University of Toronto's St. George campus, on the corner of Hoskin Avenue and Queen's Park. Next door is Hart House (University of Toronto), which houses athletic facilities, a theatre, an art gallery, reading rooms, sitting rooms, offices, a library, music rooms, student meeting and study space. Along with classrooms and a chapel, Wycliffe houses 75 graduate residents, many of whom are studying other disciplines at the University of Toronto and its affiliates.

Students have access, moreover, to the services of the University of Toronto, including the athletic facilities, library systems, and student union clubs.

== Academics ==
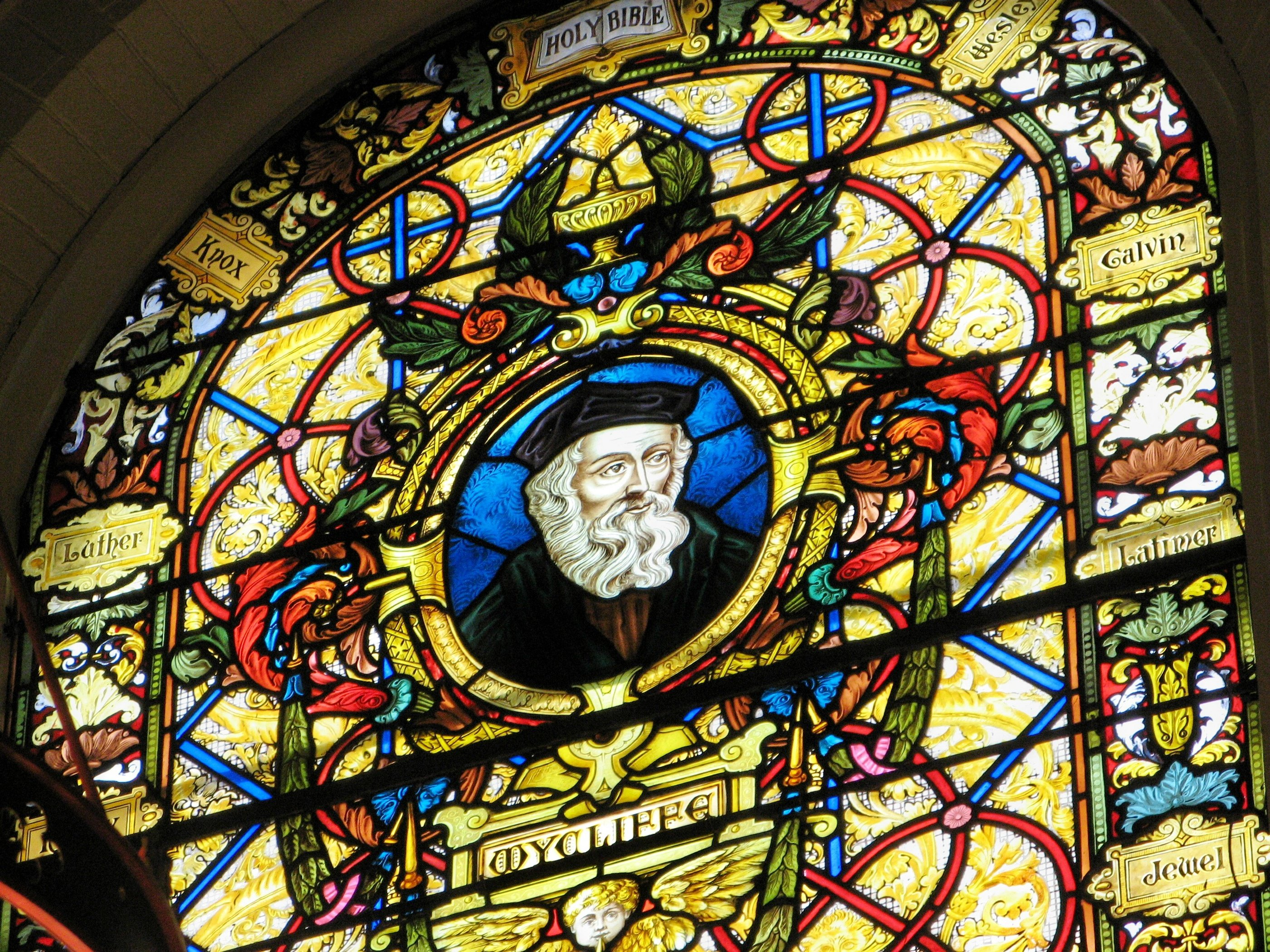
Portrait of John Wycliffe on a stained glass window in the Wycliffe College chapel

The college was accredited by the Association of Theological Schools in the United States and Canada in 1978. In the fall semester of 2017 it had 246 students. It awards the following degrees conjointly with the University of Toronto:

- Master of Divinity (M.Div.)
- Master of Theological Studies (MTS)
- Doctor of Ministry (D.Min.)
- Master of Arts in Theological Studies (MATS)
- Master of Theology (Th.M.)
- Doctor of Philosophy (Ph.D.)

As a founding member of the Toronto School of Theology, students are able to participate in the wide range of courses from Canada's largest ecumenical consortium.

A Certificate in Anglican Studies is available for candidates for the Anglican priesthood and vocational diaconate who hold an M.Div. from a non-Anglican seminary.

The Reformed House of Studies at Wycliffe College hosts an annual conference and offers a concentration in Reformed Studies, with courses taught by adjunct faculty including Bryan Chapell, Chad Van Dixhoorn and Michael Haykin.

Refresh is the college's annual continuing education conference. Past speakers have included Alister McGrath, Lauren Winner, N. T. Wright, William P. Young, Graham Alan Cray, and Graham Kendrick.

=== Library ===
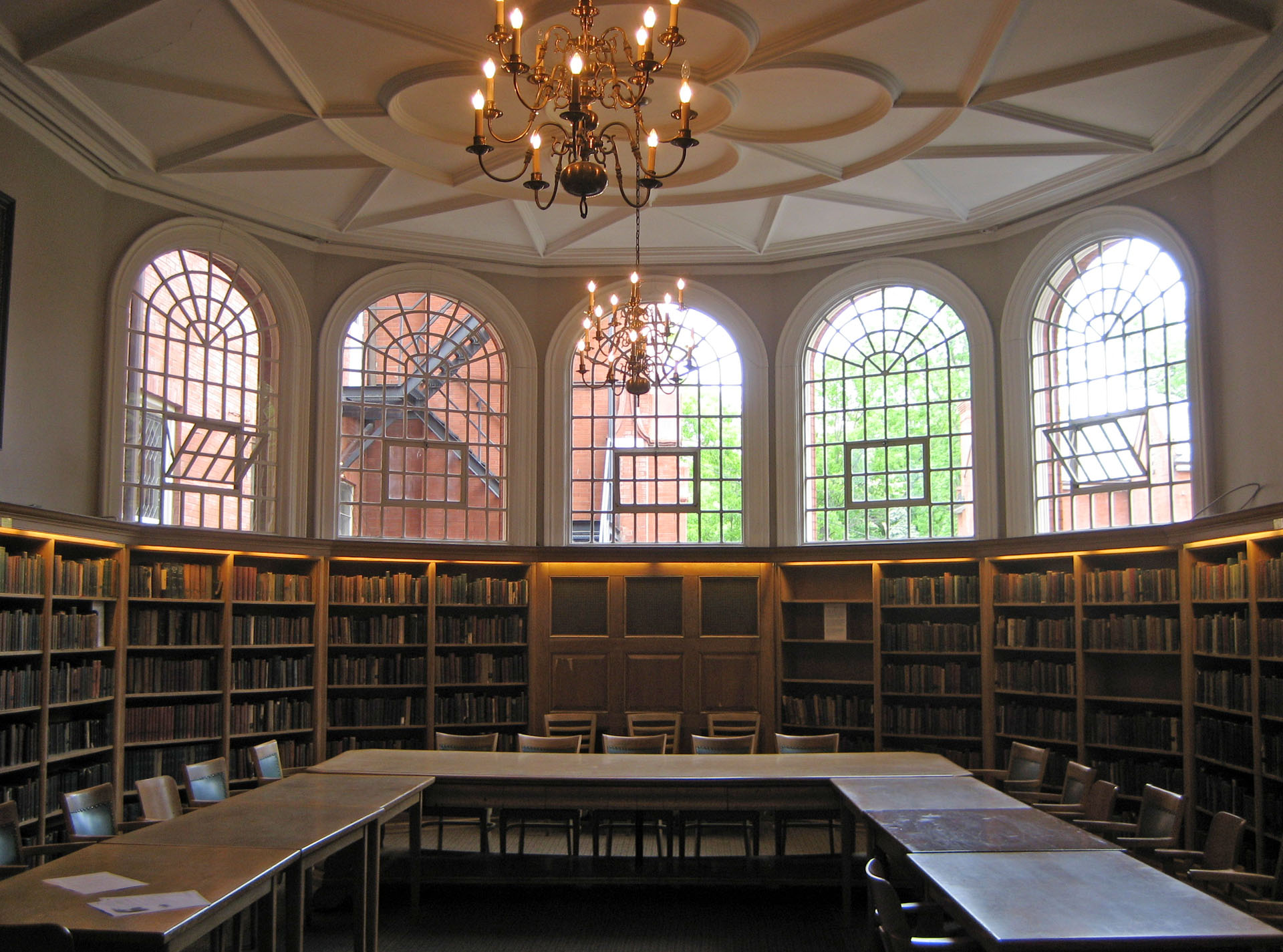
A reading room of the college

In addition to Wycliffe's collection of theological texts, students have access to the libraries of the member schools of the Toronto School of Theology, including Knox's Caven Library, St. Michael's Kelly Library, Trinity and Wycliffe's John W. Graham Library, and the libraries of Emmanuel College, Regis College, and St. Augustine's Seminary. Students, moreover, have access to the library system of the University of Toronto, including Robarts Library, Canada's largest library and the fourth largest academic library system in North America.

=== Institute of Evangelism ===
The Wycliffe College Institute of Evangelism provides resources, including teachers and practitioners of evangelism, print and A/V materials, and conferences and seminars in order to help nurture and grow evangelizing communities. The mission of the Institute of Evangelism is to "encourage and equip the church for the work of evangelism, empowering it to engage in this ministry confidently, joyfully and expectantly."

== Notable faculty ==
- R. K. Harrison, Professor of Old Testament Studies
- Jakob Jocz, Professor of Systematic Theology of Jewish background
- Richard Longenecker New Testament scholar
- Donald Coggan, Archbishop of Canterbury (1974 - 1980)
- Oliver O'Donovan Christian ethicist
- John Bainbridge Webster British Anglican systematic theologian
- Stephen Andrews - Principal
- Christopher Seitz - Senior research professor

== Noted alumni ==
- Maret Ninan Abraham (1879–1947), later known as Abraham Mar Thoma, 17th metropolitan bishop of the Mar Thoma Syrian Church of Malabar
- Alex Cameron (born 1964), bishop of the Anglican Diocese of Pittsburgh
- Edward Campion Acheson (1858–1934), bishop of the Episcopal Diocese of Connecticut and father of Dean Acheson
- Ins Choi (born 1974), Korean-Canadian playwright and actor and creator of Kim's Convenience.
- Eleanor Clitheroe-Bell (born 1954), business executive, CEO of Hydro One and Anglican priest
- Lewis Garnsworthy (1922–1990), bishop of the Anglican Diocese of Toronto and metropolitan of the Province of Ontario
- Dyson Hague (1857–1935), Anglican priest and contributing author to The Fundamentals
- Michael Haykin (born 1953), Baptist theologian and professor at the Southern Baptist Theological Seminary
- Annie Ittoshat (born 1970), suffragan bishop in the Diocese of The Arctic and first female Inuk bishop
- David Lehmann, Canadian bishop of Caledonia
- Grant LeMarquand (born 1955), area bishop for the Horn of Africa in the Anglican Diocese of Egypt
- Stephen Leung, suffragan bishop in the Anglican Diocese of Canada
- Linda Nicholls (born 1954), bishop of the Anglican Diocese of Huron and 14th Primate of the Anglican Church of Canada
- Michele Pollesel (1949–2025), general secretary of the Anglican Church of Canada and bishop of Uruguay
- Ralph Spence (born 1942), bishop of the Anglican Diocese of Niagara 1998-2008
- Reginald Stackhouse (1925–2016), Progressive-Conservative MP and Anglican priest
- Brian Stiller (born 1942), global ambassador at World Evangelical Alliance and former president of Tyndale University, Evangelical Fellowship of Canada, and Youth for Christ Canada
- Eliud Wabukala (born 1951), archbishop and primate of the Anglican Church of Kenya
