= Anglican Diocese of New Westminster =

Diocese of the Anglican Church in Canada

Coordinates: 49°17′03″N 123°07′13″W

Diocese of New Westminster
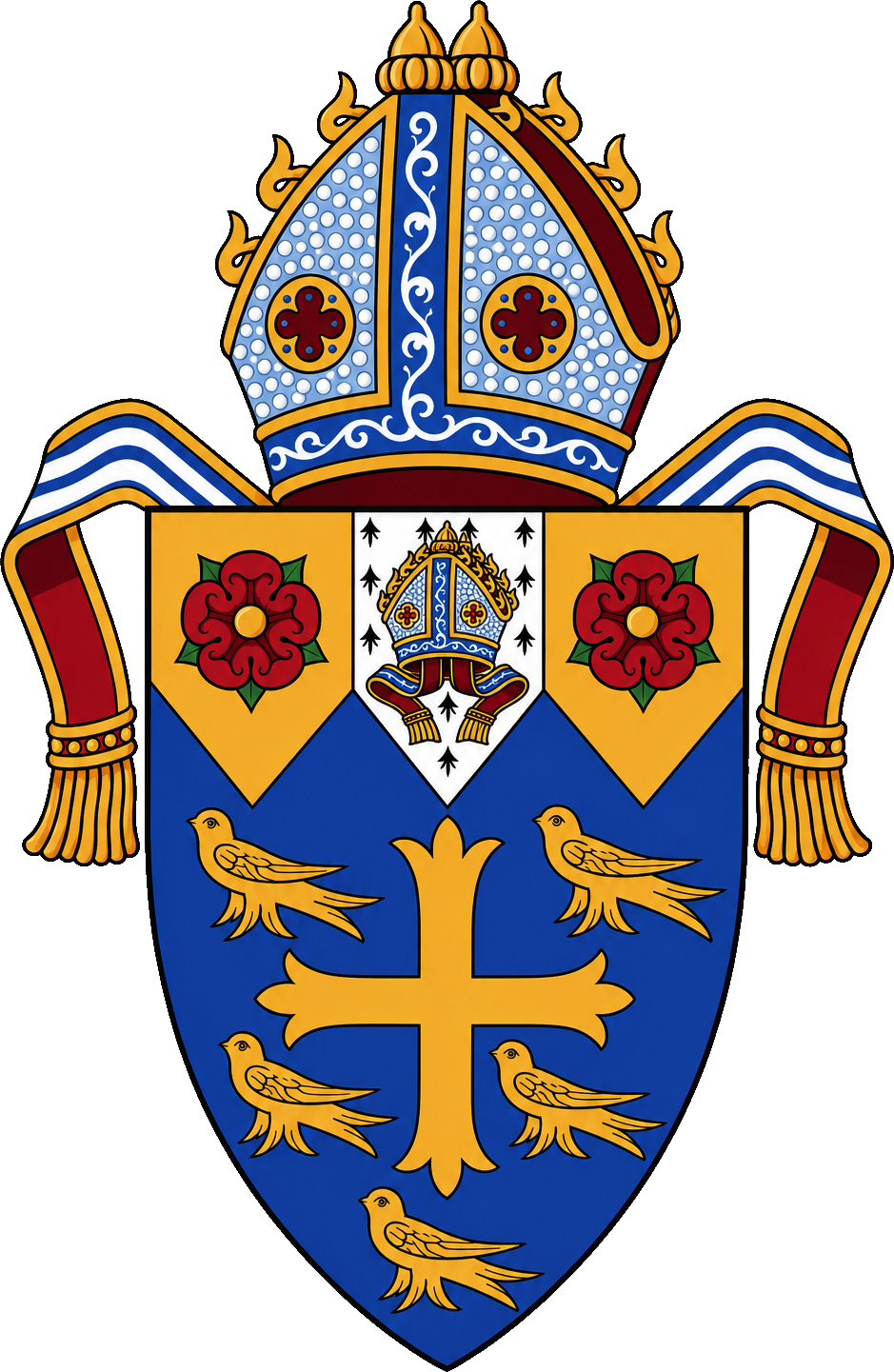

Location
- Ecclesiastical province: British Columbia and Yukon

Statistics
- Parishes: 62 (2023)
- Members: 9,960 (2023)

Information
- Rite: Anglican
- Cathedral: Christ Church Cathedral (Vancouver)

Current leadership
- Bishop: John R. Stephens

Map
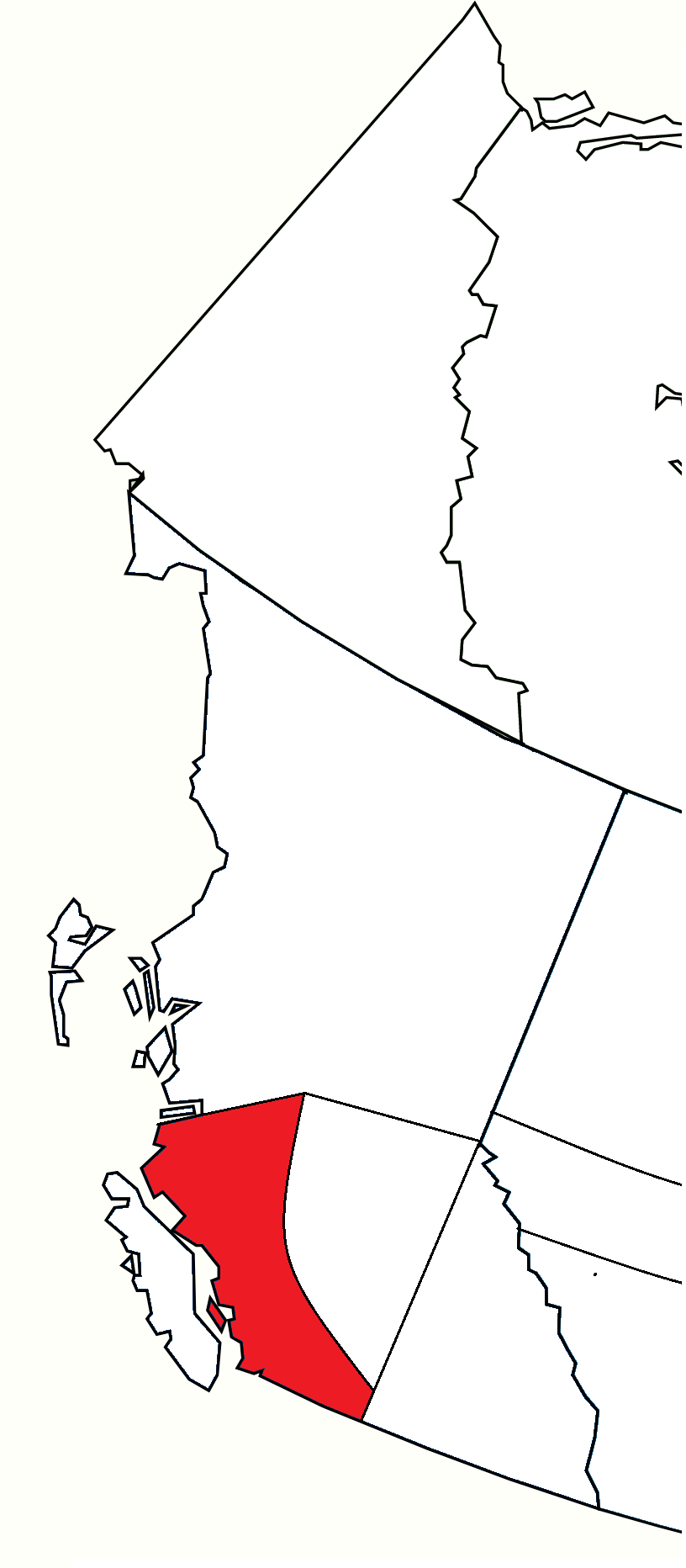
- Location of the diocese within the Ecclesiastical Province of British Columbia and Yukon.

Website
- vancouver.anglican.ca

The Diocese of New Westminster is one of five dioceses of the Ecclesiastical Province of British Columbia and Yukon of the Anglican Church of Canada. The current see city is Vancouver; previously New Westminster. The current bishop is John Stephens. He was consecrated as the coadjutor bishop on January 23, 2021, installed as diocesan bishop on February 28, 2021, and elected as the Metropolitan of British Columbia and Yukon on January 18, 2025. The Dean of New Westminster and rector of the cathedral (Christ Church Cathedral) is Christopher Pappas and the Executive Archdeacon is the Venerable Nick Pang.

The diocese encompasses about 78,000 square kilometres of the Lower Mainland in the civil province of British Columbia, comprising the Regional Districts of Metro Vancouver, Fraser Valley, Sunshine Coast, Powell River and part of the Regional District of Squamish-Lillooet (including Squamish and Whistler).

The diocese was established in New Westminster in 1879. In 1881, the Bishop (and successors) was incorporated as the Lord Bishop of New Westminster, a Corporation sole (Anglican Bishops’ Corporation Act, SBC 1881 c-2). Its Synod was incorporated April 18, 1893 (An Act to incorporate the Anglican Synod of the Diocese of New Westminster {Statutes of British Columbia 1893, Chapter 45 with amendments to 1961 {1900, 1915, 1961} 18 April 1893), but with the considerable growth of the City of Vancouver, the see city was moved there in 1929. There are, therefore, two churches styled as "cathedrals" in the diocese — Christ Church Cathedral in Vancouver has been the cathedral since 1929, while Holy Trinity Cathedral in New Westminster was the cathedral from 1892 to that date. Although no longer a cathedral, the diocesan synod allowed Holy Trinity to keep the title "cathedral" as a courtesy for historical reasons (it is, strictly speaking, a proto-cathedral).

The diocese has 62 active parishes and 4 emerging faith communities with approximately 10,000 members on its parish rolls according to the recent statistics stated in the official publication Topic.

The diocese has traditionally been at the forefront of progressive causes within the Anglican Communion. In 1976, David Somerville was one of the first bishops of the Canadian Church to ordain women to the priesthood (women had been ordained as deacons previously). In 2002, the diocese became the centre of an international controversy within the Anglican Communion due to its decision to bless same-sex unions. Several conservative ecclesiastical provinces in the communion, particularly those in Africa, have severed relations with the diocese over the issue (see Homosexuality and the Anglican Communion).

At the May 11, 2016, meeting of the Diocesan Council (Executive Committee) the governing body of the diocese synod unanimously passed the following motion: That Diocesan Council, on behalf of the Diocese of New Westminster: I. Accept the invitation of the Episcopal Diocese of Northern Philippines to enter into a companion relationship seeking opportunities for prayer, mutual learning, and witness to the gospel (the "Companion Relationship"); II. undertake an annual evaluation of the Companion Relationship to ensure that the Companion Relationship satisfies the mutual goals of the two dioceses (the "Annual Evaluations"); and III. ask the Bishop to appoint members from the Diocese of New Westminster to a joint-diocesan working group to oversee the Companion Relationship and to undertake the Annual Evaluations.

Then-Bishop Brent Alawas of the Episcopal Diocese of Northern Philippines (as of 2022, Bishop Alawas is currently the Presiding Bishop of the Episcopal Church in the Philippines) travelled from Bontoc to Vancouver on May 12, 2016 and was present as a guest speaker at the diocesan mission conference on May 14, 2016

The diocesan offices, gathering space, meeting rooms and archives are located at 1410 Nanton Avenue in the Shaughnessy section of the City of Vancouver where the former Bishop's residence was located.

== Coat of arms and badge ==
The coat of arms and badge are both official marks for the diocese. In practice, the crest is generally used more when the bishop is involved directly, and the badge when specifically referencing only the diocese.

The coat of arms, with much history behind it, was acquired by Bishop Gower in 1960. It strongly references that of Westminster Abbey, London, UK.

The badge (a blue circle, gold cross and birds over white wave) was created for the diocesan communications committee with the help of Robert Watt, Chief Herald of Canada, and officially adopted at the 2007 diocesan synod.

The badge is a proper heraldic symbol for use on diocesan and parish materials. It incorporates key elements of the diocesan coat of arms, but is less detailed, and the badge is easier to reproduce properly than the very detailed coat of arms.

== Bishops of New Westminster ==
No.	Name	Dates	Notes
1	Acton Sillitoe	1879–1894	
2	John Dart	1895–1910	
3	Adam de Pencier	1910–1940	Metropolitan of British Columbia, 1925–1940
4	Sir Francis Heathcote	1940–1951	
5	Godfrey Gower	1951–1971	Metropolitan of British Columbia and Yukon, 1969–1971
6	David Somerville	1971–1980	Metropolitan of British Columbia and Yukon, 1975–1980
7	Douglas Hambidge	1980–1993	Metropolitan of British Columbia and Yukon, 1981–1993
8	Michael Ingham	1994–2014	
9	Melissa Skelton	2014–2021	Metropolitan of British Columbia and Yukon, 2018–2021
10	John Stephens	2021–present	Metropolitan of British Columbia and Yukon, 2025–present

== See also ==
- Peter Elliott (Canadian priest)
- Sir Francis Heathcote, 9th Baronet
- Christ Church Cathedral, Vancouver

== Bibliography ==
Adams, Neal (2006) [1989]. Living Stones: A History of Christ Church Cathedral, Vancouver, BC (2 ed.). Vancouver: Christ Church Cathedral. p. 144. ISBN 9780978220709.

Grove, Lyndon (1979). Pacific Pilgrims. Vancouver: Fforbez Publications. p. 200. ISBN 9780978220709.

Peake, Frank A. (1959). The Anglican Church in British Columbia. Vancouver: Mitchell Press. p. 208. ISBN 9780978220709.
