= Dean (Christianity) =

Ecclesiastical title

A dean, in an ecclesiastical context, is a cleric holding certain positions of authority within a religious hierarchy. The title is used mainly in the Catholic Church, the Anglican Communion, and many Lutheran denominations. A dean's assistant is called a sub-dean.

== History ==
Latin decanus in the Roman military was the head of a group of ten soldiers within a centuria, and by the 5th century it was the head of a group of ten monks. It came to refer to various civil functionaries in the later Roman Empire.

Based on the monastic use, it came to mean the head of a chapter of canons of a collegiate church or cathedral church.

Based on that use, deans in universities now fill various administrative positions.

Latin decanus should not be confused with Greek diákonos (διάκονος), from which the word deacon derives, which describes a supportive role.

In the universities that grew out of the cathedral and monastery schools, a university dean came to be an official with various administrative duties.

== Catholic Church ==
The title "dean" is conferred upon a parish priest who serves as a senior figure, though usually without specific jurisdictional authority, over an area or section of a diocese. These are sometimes referred to as "rural deans", and are expected to show a degree of leadership among the priests of the region, known as a deanery. This function is sometimes titled vicar forane, (Note: Forane is Latin for "in a foreign land") abbreviated to "VF". The Second Vatican Council's Decree concerning the Pastoral Office of Bishops in the Church (1965) referred to "vicars forane and deans" together (Latin: Vicarii Foranei, Decani).

An episcopal vicar serves a broader diocesan function, and has more formal authority and specific powers under canon law.

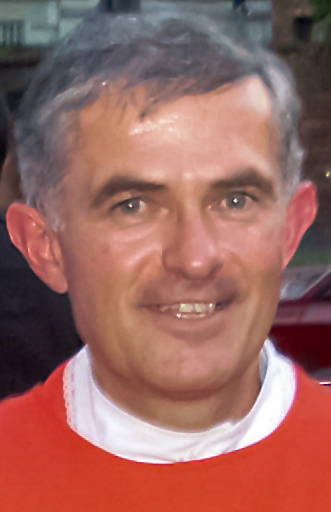
John Salvano, a Catholic priest, who was Dean of St Patrick's Cathedral in Victoria, Australia

In Australia, the terms "dean" and "administrator of the Cathedral parish" are both used in relation to the pastor in charge of St Patrick's Cathedral, Melbourne. In recent years, the Catholic Church in England and Wales has introduced the custom of designating cathedral deans, formerly known as cathedral administrators, for example the Cathedral of St John the Baptist in Norwich has a "Cathedral Dean". However, the term differs slightly from the Anglican usage as Catholic deans do not necessarily preside over the cathedral chapter (this function belonging to the office of Provost) and are not necessarily required even to be a member of the chapter. More commonly, in places throughout the world where a cathedral chapter has not been erected (as for instance, in the United States, where there are no chapters at all), the term rector is used for the priest who serves as chief administrator of a cathedral church, as it is in other religious communities.

The term "dean" is also used in the Eastern Catholic Churches: Ibrahim Ibrahim, now a bishop, formerly served as dean of the western region of the Melkite Eparchy of Newton in the United States.

The Dean of the College of Cardinals and the Cardinal Vice-Dean are the president and vice-president of the college. Both are elected. Except for presiding and delegating administrative tasks, they have no authority over the cardinals, acting as primus inter pares (first among equals). The current dean is Luis Antonio Cardinal Tagle, approved on 8 October 2026.

== Anglican Communion ==
=== Cathedrals ===
In the Church of England and elsewhere in the Anglican Communion, the dean is the chief resident cleric of a cathedral or other collegiate church and the head of the chapter of canons. If the cathedral or collegiate church has its own parish, the dean is usually also rector of the parish. However, in the Church of Ireland the roles are often separated, and most cathedrals in the Church of England do not have associated parishes. In the Church in Wales, however, most cathedrals are parish churches, and their deans are now also vicars of their parishes. In some parts of the Communion (particularly in the Scottish Episcopal Church and, formerly in some cathedrals in England), the senior resident cleric in a cathedral is a provost. Each diocese of the Scottish Episcopal Church has a dean of the diocese: this is a cleric who, rather than heading the cathedral staff, assists the bishop in the administration of the diocese. In this way, a Scottish Episcopal dean is similar to an archdeacon in the other member churches of the Communion (a post that does not exist in the Scottish church). In the Anglican Church of Canada, the roles of senior cleric of the cathedral are combined in one person who is referred to as "Rector of Cathedral and Dean of Diocese". Thus, Peter Elliott was Rector of Christ Church Cathedral and Dean of New Westminster.

The style The Very Reverend distinguishes a cleric as a dean (or a cathedral provost). For example, the Very Reverend June Osborne was Dean of Salisbury Cathedral. The legal act by which a cathedral dean in the Church of England takes up their role is the institution, which is invariably followed in the same service by the installation (into his/her stall in the cathedral church); an "institution and installation" are very often referred to simply as an installation. In consideration of the high status of a Dean, the Very Reverend title is normally a permanent title preferment.

Some important deans include the deans of St Paul's, Canterbury Cathedral and Westminster Abbey. Westminster Abbey is a royal peculiar, not the seat of any bishop or a cathedral, but is led by a dean. The deans of Washington National Cathedral and St. Patrick's Cathedral, Dublin, are likewise important clerics in their churches.

=== Rural or area deaneries ===
In many parts of the Anglican Communion, parishes are grouped together to form deaneries, each being a constituent administrative district of the diocese. Usually, a deanery is led by one of the incumbents of the deanery's parishes, who is called a rural dean, but in more urban areas this has often been replaced by the title area dean or regional dean. Such a dean chairs the meeting of the deanery's clergy (which, like a cathedral, is called a chapter), and may also chair a deanery synod. Rural deans (and those known by alternative titles) rank as primi inter pares of their chapters, and do not have the seniority of cathedral or diocesan deans.

=== Other uses ===
The head of an Anglican theological college or seminary may also be called a dean (in common with its use in education).

== Lutheran Church ==
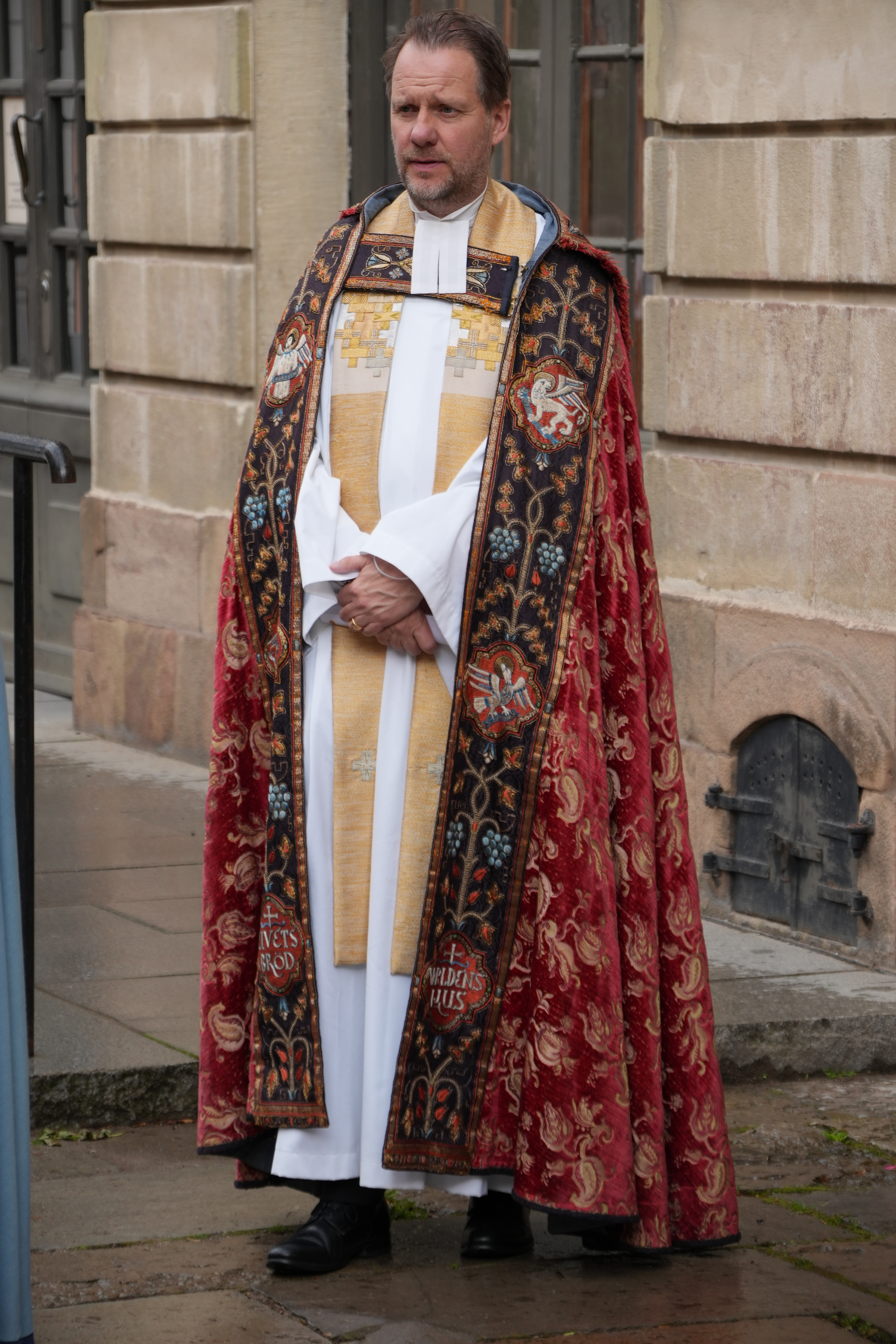
A Lutheran dean in a cope.

Within the Lutheran tradition, particularly in the Nordic and Baltic tradition of evangelical episcopal Lutheranism, senior clergy bear the title 'Dean'. Each diocese usually has a cathedral Dean, in charge of the cathedral church, and a series of area deans to supervise the clergy in a given geographical area. In the Evangelical Lutheran Church of Finland, there are also deans in charge of leading the administrative work and personnel of the Chapters.

== United Methodism ==
United Methodists often speak of a "dean" in terms of the dean of the cabinet. Every annual conference has a bishop's cabinet made up of the district superintendents under the bishop's appointment, as well as occasionally a few other conference officials. One of these superintendents is chosen by their colleagues to serve as the dean, usually for one year. This dean then has certain administrative and leadership responsibilities, and is accountable to the bishop.

In United Methodist camping programs, the leader of a camp program is often referred to as the "dean". This likely grew out of the academic origin of Methodist Camps as "Epworth Institutes".

== See also ==
- Archpriest
- "Dean" . Encyclopædia Britannica. Vol. VII (9th ed.). 1878. pp. 13–14.
