= Diocese of Mackenzie River =

Former diocese of the Anglican Church in Canada

The Diocese of Mackenzie River was a short-lived diocese of the Ecclesiastical Province of Rupert's Land of the Anglican Church of Canada.

It was created in 1884 by splitting the Diocese of Athabasca into two, and was itself subdivided in 1891 to create the Diocese of Selkirk (later renamed Yukon). The remainder was merged into the Diocese of Arctic when the latter diocese was created in 1933.

== Bishops of Mackenzie River ==
- 1884–1891: William Bompas
- 1891–1907: William Reeve
- 1907–1912: interregnum
- 1912–1926: James Lucas
- 1928–1933: William Geddes
