= Bill Siksay =

Canadian politician

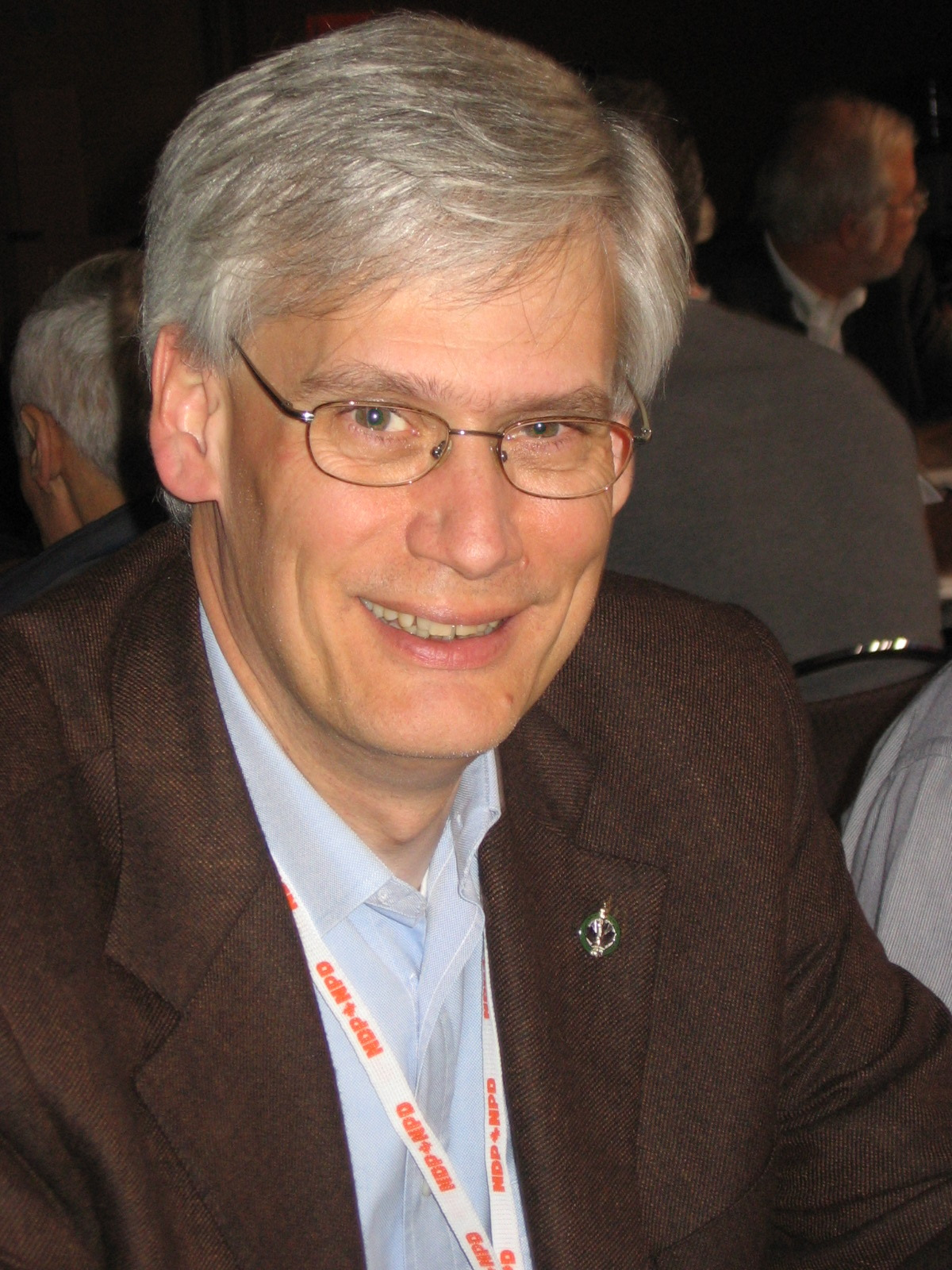
- Siksay in 2006

Member of Parliament for Burnaby—Douglas
- In office 2004–2011
- Preceded by: Svend Robinson
- Succeeded by: Kennedy Stewart

NDP Critic on LGBTT Issues
- In office 2004–2011
- Preceded by: newly created
- Succeeded by: Randall Garrison

Personal details
- Born: March 11, 1955 (age 71) Oshawa, Ontario
- Party: New Democratic Party
- Spouse: Brian Burke

William Livingstone Siksay (born March 11, 1955) is a Canadian politician. He was the Member of Parliament (MP) who represented the British Columbia riding of Burnaby—Douglas for the New Democratic Party from 2004 to 2011.

== Early life ==
Siksay was born in Oshawa, Ontario, to parents Patricia and William Siksay. Receiving his high school diploma from McLaughlin Collegiate and Vocational Institute in Oshawa, Ontario, Siksay attended Victoria College at the University of Toronto, graduating with a BA in 1978. He then enrolled in the MDiv programme at the Vancouver School of Theology at the University of British Columbia, studying as a candidate to be a congregational minister in the United Church of Canada. He was one of the first people to come out as gay or lesbian in the process of his ordination and helped start the debate in the church on the ordination and commissioning of openly gay or lesbian candidates. He did not complete the programme and was not ordained.

== Political career ==
Prior to running for elected office, he was constituency assistant to Svend Robinson for over 18 years. He also ran in the 1997 election in the riding of Vancouver Centre, but lost to incumbent Hedy Fry.

When Robinson resigned the Burnaby—Douglas seat in April 2004 due to a controversy around his theft of a piece of jewellery, Siksay won the nomination to replace Robinson as the NDP candidate in the upcoming election, and won the riding in the 2004 federal election on June 28.

With his election, Siksay became the first openly gay non-incumbent man to be elected to Canada's House of Commons. All of the previous MPs to come out as gay (Robinson, Libby Davies, Réal Ménard and Scott Brison) came out after they were elected, and Mario Silva came out in a Toronto Star profile shortly after the 2004 election.

In the NDP Shadow Cabinet, Siksay was critic for Ethics, Access to Information and Privacy, and for Gay, Lesbian, Bisexual and Transgender Issues; the NDP's was the only shadow cabinet with this latter position. He was previously critic for Citizenship and Immigration, and then for Canadian Heritage and Housing.

In May 2005, Siksay introduced a bill to amend the Canadian Human Rights Act to prohibit discrimination on the basis of gender identity or expression. He reintroduced the bill in the next parliament. In May 2009 he introduced it again, with additional provisions to add gender identity and expression to the hate crimes provisions of the Criminal Code. By June 2010, the private member's bill (C-389) had proceeded to the Standing Committee on Justice and Human Rights, with little overt opposition from the Conservative Party of Canada minority government evident. It passed at report stage by a vote of 143–131 on December 8, and passed at third reading by a vote of 143–135, in each case including members of all parties voting in favour.

In January 2006, Siksay was re-elected to the Burnaby—Douglas seat with a slightly increased plurality, with a margin of 2.5% (versus 2% in 2004). He was again re-elected by a narrow margin in the 2008 election.

Bill Siksay was the only MP in Parliament to vote against the Tackling Violent Crime Act (Bill C-2), arguing that its provisions on the age of consent would harm LGBT youth.

On December 16, 2010, Siksay announced that he would not run again in the subsequent election. His seat was retained for the New Democrats by Kennedy Stewart in the 2011 federal election.

== After politics ==
On July 2, 2014, Siksay began as working as the administrative assistant to the bishop of the Anglican Diocese of New Westminster, Melissa M. Skelton, who retired February 28, 2021. After Skelton's retirement, Siksay continued to serve the new bishop of the diocese, John Stephens, and the executive archdeacon of the diocese, Douglas Fenton.

Siksay endorsed Avi Lewis in the 2026 New Democratic Party leadership election.

== Personal life ==
He resides in Burnaby with his partner, the Reverend Brian Burke, and remains an active member of the United Church of Canada.

== See also ==
- List of the first LGBT holders of political offices
