= St. Michael and All Angels Cathedral (Kelowna, British Columbia) =

Church in Canada

Coordinates: 49.5301°N 119.2936°W

Cathedral Church of St. Michael and All Angels
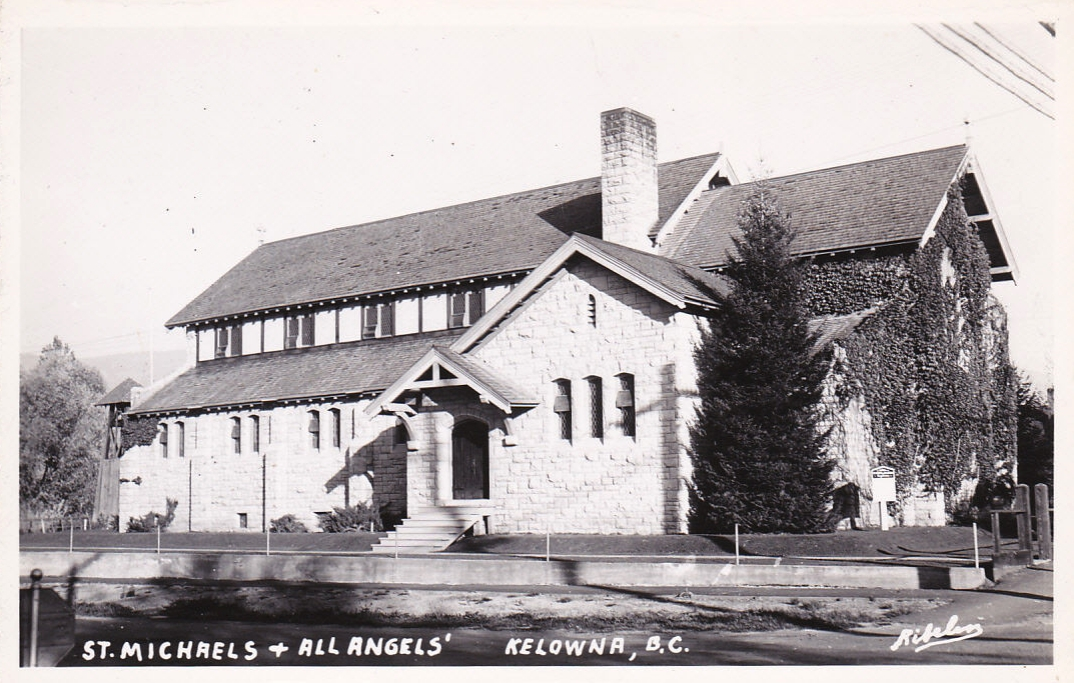
- The cathedral pictured in a 1940s-era postcard.
- Cathedral Church of St. Michael and All Angels
- Denomination: Anglican Church of Canada
- Website: stmichaelscathedral.ca

History
- Dedicated: 1913

Administration
- Province: British Columbia and Yukon
- Diocese: Kootenay

Clergy
- Bishop: Lynne McNaughton
- Vicar: Rita Harrison
- Dean: David Tiessen

St. Michael and All Angels Cathedral is the Anglican cathedral of the Diocese of Kootenay: it is in Kelowna and the current dean is The Very Rev. Nissa Basbaum.
