= Vincent Fenga =

Zimbabwe-born Canadian Anglican bishop

The Right Reverend Vincent Fenga
- Bishop of Yukon
- Church: Anglican Church of Canada
- Diocese: Yukon
- In office: Since 2026
- Predecessor: Lesley Wheeler-Dame
- Previous post: Dean of Yukon (2022–2026)

Orders
- Ordination: 2006 (priesthood)
- Consecration: 19 June 2026 by John Stephens

Personal details
- Born: 1980 or 1981 (age 45–46) Salisbury, Zimbabwe
- Spouse: Crescensia
- Children: 4

Vincent Farirai Fenga is a Zimbabwe-born Canadian Anglican bishop. In 2026, he was elected and consecrated as bishop of the Diocese of Yukon in the Anglican Church of Canada. He was previously dean of Yukon and rector of Christ Church Cathedral in Whitehorse, before which he was an Anglican priest in Zimbabwe.

== Biography ==
Vincent Fenga was born and raised in Harare, then known as Salisbury. He obtained bachelor's and master's degrees from the University of Zimbabwe and studied for his Ph.D. at the University of Pretoria.

He was ordained a priest in the Anglican Diocese of Harare in the Church of the Province of Central Africa at 25. He served as vicar of St. Mary's Parish, archdeacon of Chitungwiza and as a chaplain for a group of widows and single mothers in the diocese.

In 2022, Fenga moved from Harare to Whitehorse to serve as dean of Yukon and rector of the cathedral. As dean of Christ Church Cathedral, he built relationships with better-resourced Anglican churches in more populous areas of Canada, such as the Diocese of New Westminster, to improve services at Yukon churches and provide coverage for the small number of Yukon clergy.

He was elected the 13th bishop of the Yukon in March 2026. His consecration and installation took place in June 2026.

== Personal life ==
Fenga is married to Crescensia, a nurse. They have four children.

== Bibliography ==
- Fenga, Vincent F.; Wepener, Cas (2018). "Prophetic preaching in the socio-economic and socio-political crisis of Zimbabwe". Verbum et Ecclesia. 39 (1): 1–8. doi:10.4102/ve.v39i1.1830.

Anglican Communion titles
Preceded by Lesley Wheeler-Dame	Bishop of Yukon; Since 2026	Incumbent
