= Lesley Wheeler-Dame =

Canadian Anglican bishop (born 1955)

The Right Reverend Leslie Wheeler-Dame
- Bishop of Yukon
- Church: Anglican Church of Canada
- Diocese: Yukon
- In office: 2019–2025
- Predecessor: Larry Robertson
- Successor: Vincent Fenga

Orders
- Ordination: 2003 (diaconate); 2005 (priesthood)
- Consecration: 24 August 2019 by Melissa M. Skelton

Personal details
- Born: 24 October 1955 (age 70) Windsor, Ontario

Lesley Wheeler-Dame (born 24 October 1955) is a Canadian-Anglican bishop. In 2019, she was elected and consecrated as bishop of the Diocese of Yukon in the Anglican Church of Canada.

== Life ==
Wheeler-Dame was born in Windsor, Ontario. Her mother was an Anglican priest in the Diocese of Huron. She raised three children as a single mother and is married to Eric. Together they have six grandchildren and one living great-grandchild. In 1996, she moved to the Yukon Territory to work for the territorial government as a social worker specializing in family violence, suicide prevention and alcohol abuse.

In 1997, Wheeler-Dame became lay minister-in-charge of a Yukon parish. She eventually pursued ordained ministry and became a deacon in 2003 and a priest in 2005. She was an incumbent priest and regional dean in the Diocese of Athabasca before becoming incumbent at Fort Nelson, British Columbia, in the Diocese of Yukon, where she also served as an archdeacon.

In May 2019, she was elected bishop coadjutor to succeed Larry Robertson. She was consecrated in August 2019 and installed as bishop. In March 2025, she announced that she would retire in October 2025 on her 70th birthday.

== Notes ==
Anglican Communion titles
Preceded by Larry Robertson	Bishop of Yukon; 2019–2025	Succeeded by Vincent Fenga
