= James Lucas (bishop) =

Canadian Anglican bishop

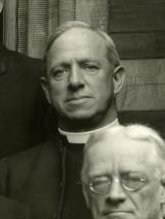
The Right Reverend James Lucas c.1924

James Richard Lucas (20 August 1867 – 9 October 1938) was an eminent Anglican clergyman in the first half of the 20th century. He was Bishop of Mackenzie River in Canada from 1912 to 1926.

== Biography ==
He was born on 20 August 1867 in Brighton, England. He was educated at Brighton, Hove and Sussex Grammar School and the CMS College, Islington before going to Canada in 1891.

He was ordained in 1892 and served at Fort Chipewyan then Fort Simpson. In 1906 he became Archdeacon of Mackenzie River and six years later its bishop, serving for fourteen years. Later an Assistant Bishop in Saskatchewan (1926–1927), he was Warden of the Canadian Church Army from 1929 until 1934. At some point, he became a Doctor of Divinity (DD).

He died on 9 October 1938.

Anglican Communion titles
Vacant Title last held by William Reeve	Bishop of Mackenzie River; 1912–1926	Succeeded by William Geddes
