= William Geddes =

William Geddes may refer to:

- William George Nicholson Geddes (1913–1993), Scottish civil engineer
- William Duguid Geddes (1828–1900), Scottish scholar and educationalist
- William Geddes (bishop) (1894–1947), Anglican bishop
