= Ralph Dean =

Canadian Anglican bishop

Ralph Stanley Dean (1913, London – 23 August 1987) was the fifth Bishop of Cariboo and sixth Metropolitan of British Columbia.

Dean was born in London in 1913, educated at The John Roan School and ordained in 1939. After curacies at St Mary, Islington and St Luke, Watford he was Chaplain, Tutor and then Vice Principal at the London College of Divinity. Emigrating to Canada, he was Principal of Emmanuel College, Saskatoon, Canada and the Incumbent at Sutherland until his elevation to the episcopate in 1956.

While serving as Bishop of Cariboo, Dean took leave from his diocese (but retained the See) in order to serve as Executive Officer of the Anglican Communion, based in his native London from 1 November 1964; that role, and his leave, ended in May 1969 and Dean returned to British Columbia. In 1971, he was additionally appointed Metropolitan of British Columbia, which post he held with his diocesan See; while Metropolitan he was customarily called Archbishop of Cariboo, rather than Bishop of Cariboo. He resigned both posts in December 1973 to take a parish post in South Carolina.

Anglican Communion titles
Preceded by Frederic Stanford	Bishop of Cariboo (Archbishop 1971–1973); 1956–1973	Succeeded by John Snowden
Preceded by Godfrey Gower	Metropolitan of British Columbia; 1971–1973	Succeeded by John Frame
