= Henry Marsh (bishop) =

Henry Hooper Marsh (6 October 1898 – 27 January 1995) was an eminent Anglican bishop in the second half of the 20th century.

He was born into an ecclesiastical family on 6 October 1898 and educated at University College, Toronto. Ordained in 1925 his first posts were curacies at St Anne, Toronto and St Paul, in the same city. After this he was Priest in charge of St Timothy's Mission, North Toronto. When this became a parish he was its Rector from 1936 to 1962 when he became Bishop of Yukon. He retired in 1967 and died on 27 January 1995. He had become a Doctor of Divinity (DD).

Religious titles
| Preceded by Tom Greenwood | Bishop of Yukon; 1962–1967 | Succeeded by John Frame |
