= Homosexuality and the Anglican Church of Canada =

The Anglican Church of Canada is the third largest church in Canada, after the Roman Catholic Church and the United Church of Canada. After many years of debate, the first blessing of a same-sex partnership took place in 2003, by the Diocese of New Westminster, in Vancouver. This was not considered a marriage ceremony, but rather a blessing of "permanent and faithful commitments" between persons of the same sex.

Currently, the dioceses of Algoma, British Columbia, Central Newfoundland, Eastern Newfoundland, Edmonton, Huron, Kootenay, Montreal, New Westminster, Niagara, Nova Scotia and Prince Edward Island, Ontario, Ottawa, Qu'Appelle, Quebec, Rupert's Land, the Territory of the People, Toronto, and Western Newfoundland permit same-sex marriage, as does the Anglican Military Ordinariate. The diocese of Saskatoon permits the blessing of same-sex civil marriages.

== Changes in Canadian law ==
In the secular context, Canadian law has undergone a profound change in regards to homosexuality. The last homosexual to be sent to prison indefinitely as a "dangerous sex offender" was in 1967. In 1969, the Canadian parliament passed amendments into the Criminal Code decriminalizing homosexuality in Canada. On 20 July 1971, the last homosexual criminally convicted on his sexual orientation was released from prison. On 20 July 2005, the Canadian government legalised same-sex marriage. Currently nine dioceses of the Anglican Church of Canada permit the blessing of same-sex unions: the Vancouver-based Diocese of New Westminster, the Diocese of Edmonton, the Diocese of Ottawa, the Diocese of Toronto, the diocese of Quebec, the Diocese of Rupert's Land, the Hamilton-based Diocese of Niagara, the Diocese of Montreal, and the Victoria-based Diocese of British Columbia. The Kamloops-based Territory of the People also permit such rites.

== Similar debate in the United Church of Canada ==
The Anglican Church of Canada is the third largest church in Canada, after the Roman Catholic Church and the United Church of Canada. The United Church of Canada had a lengthy and conflictual debate on homosexuality. On 24 August 1988 it "officially consider[ed] gays and lesbians for ordination as ministers." The United Church's debate was divisive and acrimonious. The United Church is a congregational church which allowed a compromise solution. In the summer of 1992, a group of congregations welcoming to homosexuals called themselves the 'Affirming Congregations'. Thus, "same-sex marriage and/or covenanting services are available through some United Churches." In Canada, legal same-sex marriages performed by a major Christian denomination are possible. In Vancouver, the first legally sanctioned same-sex marriage—which became legal two years earlier in British Columbia—was performed by a minister of the United Church of Canada on 8 July 2003.

== 1992 ecclesiastical trial ==
In 1992 an Anglican priest, James Ferry, was brought before a Bishops' Court for being in a same-sex relationship. Ferry was stripped of his licence and "inhibited" from functioning as a priest. Ferry left the ACC and joined the Metropolitan Community Church of Toronto but, in 1998, was partially reinstated. In 2006 Archbishop Terence Finlay, who had launched the proceedings against Ferry, was himself disciplined by his successor as Bishop of Toronto for assisting in a same-sex wedding in a Toronto United Church, saying, "I think our church has waited a long time and has discussed this issue over and over and in this particular situation, time just run out for me."

== 1994 Human Rights Commission ==
James Rawson partner of the late Rev. James McCue took the Anglican Diocese of Toronto to Ontario Human Rights Commission for denial of survivor pension benefits.

== Blessing of same-sex unions in dioceses around the country ==
The debate in the Anglican Church of Canada became passionate when, in 1998, the Diocesan Synod of one Canadian diocese, the Vancouver-based Diocese of New Westminster, voted to ask episcopal authorization for the blessing of same-sex unions. The bishop withheld consent pending further extensive consultation, and withheld consent again in 2001, but granted consent at the 2002 Synod. The use of a rite, designed for the purpose, by individual parishes was permitted following a specific request of the parish made through its annual vestry meeting or resolution of its parochial church council. In May 2003, six of the diocese's 76 parishes received authorization to use the rite. On 28 May 2003, the first same-sex union sanctioned by the Diocese of New Westminster occurred in Vancouver in the church basement of St. Margaret's Cedar Cottage Church. Bishop Michael Ingham said of the rite, "This is not a marriage ceremony, but a blessing of permanent and faithful commitments between persons of the same sex." Since then ten other dioceses (Edmonton, Nova Scotia and Prince Edward Island, Winnipeg-based Rupert's Land, Ottawa, Toronto, London-based Huron, Quebec, Hamilton-based Niagara, Montreal and Victoria-based British Columbia) have followed suit. The Anglican Parishes of the Central Interior (formerly the Kamloops-based Diocese of Cariboo and now known as the Territory of the People) also permit such rites.

== Ordination of LGBT clergy ==
In 2012, the Diocese of Montreal ordained two openly gay and partnered men to the diaconate and priesthood. Also in that year, the Diocese of Saskatoon ordained an openly lesbian and married deacon. In 2016, the Diocese of Toronto became the first to elect an openly gay and partnered bishop.

== 2003 letter by Archbishop Peers ==
In an October 2003 letter by then-primate Archbishop Michael Peers said, "Canadian gays and lesbians will continue to be welcomed and received in our churches and to have their contributions to our common life honoured."

== 2004 synod resolution ==
In May 2004, the General Synod of the Anglican Church of Canada passed a resolution on homosexuality, urging the church to continue dialogue and to:

affirm the crucial value of continued respectful dialogue and study of biblical, theological, liturgical, pastoral, scientific, psychological and social aspects of human sexuality; and call upon all bishops, clergy and lay leaders to be instrumental in seeing that dialogue and study continue, intentionally involving gay and lesbian persons...to prepare resources for the church to use in addressing issues relating to human sexuality including the blessing of same sex unions and the changing definition of marriage in society.

The resolution concluded that the Synod:

Affirm the integrity and sanctity of committed adult same sex relationships."

== Windsor Report ==
On 19 October 2004, the Windsor Report of the Lambeth Commission criticised both The Episcopal Church and the Diocese of New Westminster.

Following the submission of the Windsor Report's recommendations, Bishop Michael Ingham of New Westminster agreed "neither to encourage nor to initiate" same-sex blessings in additional parishes, but stopped short of declaring a moratorium on those occurring in parishes already licensed to perform them.

== Interpretations of the marriage canon ==
Although the Anglican Church of Canada has an authorized rite for the blessing of civil marriages, its Marriage Canon is used for interpreting the rite. Since it presumes (but does not prescribe) opposite-sex partners, the Anglican Church of Canada disallows clergy to use the rite in all dioceses of the church including New Westminster. The Very Rev. Peter Wall, Dean of Niagara and the Most Rev. Terence Finlay, retired Archbishop of Toronto and Metropolitan of Ontario have each been disciplined for celebrating lesbian weddings, Wall at Christ's Church Cathedral (Hamilton) and Finlay in a United Church.

== St. Michael Report ==
In 2005, at the request of the primate, Andrew Hutchison, a theological commission produced the St. Michael Report. It recommended, among other things, that the national church treat the blessing of same-sex unions as analogous to marriage, and hence a matter touching on doctrine (although not what it called "core doctrine").

It did conclude that the issue is fundamentally related to the doctrines of salvation (soteriology), incarnation, the work of the Holy Spirit (pneumatology), our creation in the image of God (theological anthropology), sanctification, and holy matrimony. It was not within the mandate of the commission to understand how the issue relates to these doctrines, but further study of the issue was recommended.

It also noted that blessing a same-sex union that had been performed by a civil authority was really no different than actually performing such a marriage.

== 106th Diocesan Synod of New Westminster ==
In May 2007, the 106th Diocesan Synod of New Westminster passed a motion that "no person will be denied Baptism, Communion, or Confirmation because of their own or their parents’ sexual orientation."

== Backlash from conservative Anglicans in Africa ==
This decision was condemned by some Canadian Anglicans and some provinces of the Communion. Several conservative national Anglican churches, notably those of Uganda and Nigeria, have declared themselves out of communion with the ACC as a result of their disquiet with the ACC's perceived excessive inclusivity with respect to female and gay clergy and laity and in particular over the blessing of same-sex unions in New Westminster.

== 2007 General Synod of the Anglican Church of Canada ==
Meeting in June, 2007, the General Synod of the Anglican Church of Canada voted to affirm that the blessing of same-sex unions was not a matter of core doctrine; but a motion to authorize dioceses to permit the blessing of such unions was narrowly defeated by the order of bishops (it was passed by the orders of clergy and laity). A subsequent motion passed by General Synod called for the Primate's Theological Commission to make proposals regarding the revision of the marriage canon, to allow for the marriage of all legally qualified individuals (which, in Canada, would include gays and lesbians). The Diocese of New Westminster construed the actions of Synod as permitting it to continue its blessings of same-sex unions.

== Episcopal requests to bless same-sex marriages ==
Delegates to the synods of the dioceses of Montreal and Ottawa proceeded to bring forward motions requesting episcopal authorisation of the blessing of same-sex unions later in 2007. The resolutions passed, prompting the two diocesan bishops to announce that they would consult with the national House of Bishops, the diocese, and Anglicans both nationally and internationally before acting on the motions. As of 2007, by virtue of the pastoral letter on the subject by the House of Bishops, priests may offer a service of the Eucharist (i.e. a Nuptial Mass) with intercessions for a civilly-married couple provided that neither vows are exchanged nor a blessing given.

== Resolution of the Diocese of Niagara ==
The Diocese of Niagara passed a resolution to allow the blessing of same-sex unions in 2004, but Bishop Ralph Spence withheld assent. In 2007, he gave assent to a motion quite similar to that passed by the synods of Montreal and Ottawa, and indicated further consultations will take place before permission is given to clergy to conduct same-sex blessings.

== Unresolved questions ==
To date, the ACC as a whole has resolved neither the question of ordaining non-celibate gay and lesbian clergy nor the question of blessing same-sex unions. Yet as a local option at diocesan level so far the blessing of same-sex unions is practised in eleven dioceses, and on September 30, 2012, the Bishop of Saskatoon ordained as deacon an individual who is civilly married to a person of the same sex.

== Divisions and separations ==
In February 2008, St. John's (Shaughnessy) Anglican church in Vancouver voted overwhelmingly (97.7%) to break fellowship with the Anglican Church of Canada and their diocesan bishop, Michael Ingham, over the issue of homosexuality. The parish accepted an invitation to receive oversight from the conservative Anglican Province of the Southern Cone (South America). Following this, fifteen other parishes in Canada have made a similar move, prompting legal action from dioceses.

== Recent events ==
At the General Synod on July 6, 2013, the Anglican Church of Canada made the decision to vote on the issue of same sex marriage at the following synod in 2016. The vote that was slated to take place at the 2016 synod would decide whether or not to change the church's canon on marriage and "to allow the marriage of same-sex couples in the same way as opposite-sex couples." If the vote at the 2016 synod was in favour of changing the marriage canon, it would then require a second vote at the following synod in 2019 in order for the canon to be changed to allow for same sex marriage. The General Synod of the Anglican Church Of Canada normally meets every three years. In 2011, the Diocese of Ottawa allowed a local option for parishes to perform same-sex marriages with the permission of the bishop.

In 2013, the dioceses of Ontario, Huron and British Columbia joined several others in allowing blessings for gay and lesbian marriages.

=== 2016 vote in favour of same-sex marriage ===
At the General Synod in 2016, the vote to include same-sex marriage in the marriage canon received the necessary two-thirds in each of the three houses (liaty, clergy and bishops) and was approved. It was to receive the Second Reading in 2019. However, due to technical malfunctions in the voting process, it was thought at first that the resolution to include same-sex marriage in the marriage canon had failed to attain the necessary two-thirds majority by just one vote. Therefore, the Dioceses of Niagara and Ottawa, both of which already allowed blessing rites, announced that they would immediately allow same-sex marriages. Following the revised result of the vote, the Bishop of Niagara stated "I am committed to my promise to our diocese and local LGBTQ2 community to continue to walk along the path of full inclusion and to immediately proceed with equal marriage". Also in 2016, the Diocese of Toronto elected Kevin Robertson, for the first time, an openly gay and partnered person to be a bishop.

=== 2019 vote ===
On July 12, 2019, at the Anglican Church of Canada's General Synod in Vancouver, Canada, the motion to amend the marriage canon failed to pass its second reading. It received the required two-thirds majority among the laity (80.9%: 89 Yes, 21 No) and the Clergy (73.2%: 60 Yes, 22 No), but fell short of two-thirds in the House of Bishops (62.2%: 23 Yes, 14 No). On the same day the General Synod did approve a document entitled "A Word to the Church", effectively introducing a "local option" where the permissibility of same-sex marriage is decided at the diocesan level by each individual bishop.

Currently, same-sex marriage is permitted in the dioceses of Algoma, British Columbia, Central Newfoundland, Eastern Newfoundland, Edmonton, Huron, Kootenay, Montreal, New Westminster, Niagara, Nova Scotia and Prince Edward Island, Ontario, Ottawa, Quebec, Rupert's Land, the Territory of the People, Toronto, and Western Newfoundland. The Anglican Military Ordinariate also permits same-sex marriage. The diocese of Saskatoon permits the blessing of same-sex civil marriages.

== See also ==
- Same-sex marriage in Canada
