= David Crawley =

David Crawley may refer to:

- David Crawley (footballer) (born 1977), Gaelic football and association football player
- David Crawley (bishop) (1937–2025), Canadian bishop
- David Crawley (professor) (born 1954), University of Houston College of Technology
