= St. Paul's Anglican Church, Vancouver =

Coordinates: 49.28321°N 123.13385°W

St Paul's Anglican Church
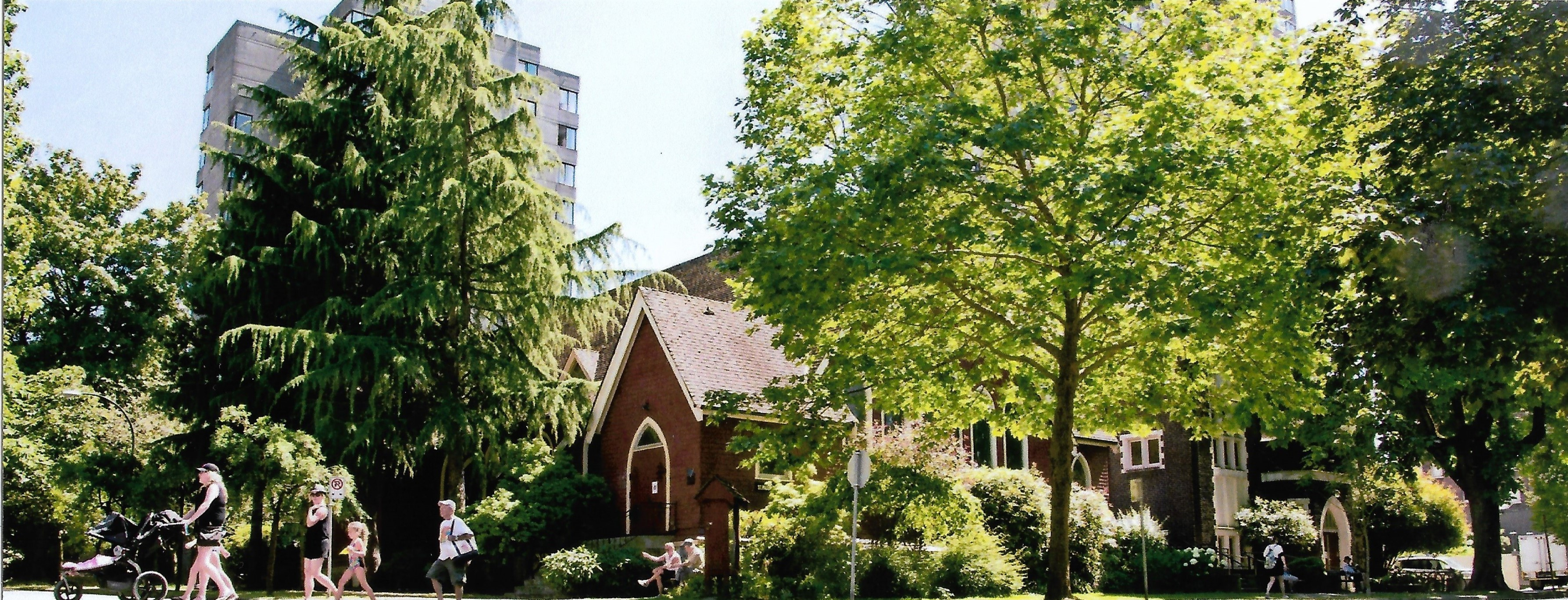
- St Paul's church with the parish hall (right) and the Pendrellis apartment building (left), 2015
- St Paul's Anglican Church
- Location: Vancouver, British Columbia
- Country: Canada
- Denomination: Anglican Church of Canada

Administration
- Province: Ecclesiastical Province of British Columbia and the Yukon
- Diocese: New Westminster
- Archdeaconry: Burrard
- Deanery: Kingsway

Clergy
- Bishop(s): The Very Rev'd John Stephens, Bishop of New Westminster
- Rector: The Rev. Ron Culmer

St. Paul's Anglican Church serves the south-west downtown peninsula of Vancouver, British Columbia, (the West End and Yaletown neighbourhoods) alongside Christ Church Cathedral (established 1888) serving the north-east (Downtown and Coal Harbour neighbourhoods). Both parishes separated from St. James (established 1881), the first Anglican Church in Granville, as Vancouver was then known.

== Early history ==
=== Church buildings ===
The Anglican Parish of St Paul was established at a time when the population of Vancouver was rapidly expanding. In response to a demand from a small group of St James' parishioners, a vacant lot was purchased and a daughter church was built in 1889. The parish was established in 1891. The church was located at the centre of the geographically defined parish, but in 1898 it was placed on skids and moved north-west, away from railway yards in Yaletown and closer to where most parishioners lived in the West End. In 1905, it was replaced by a larger church, and the old church became the parish hall.

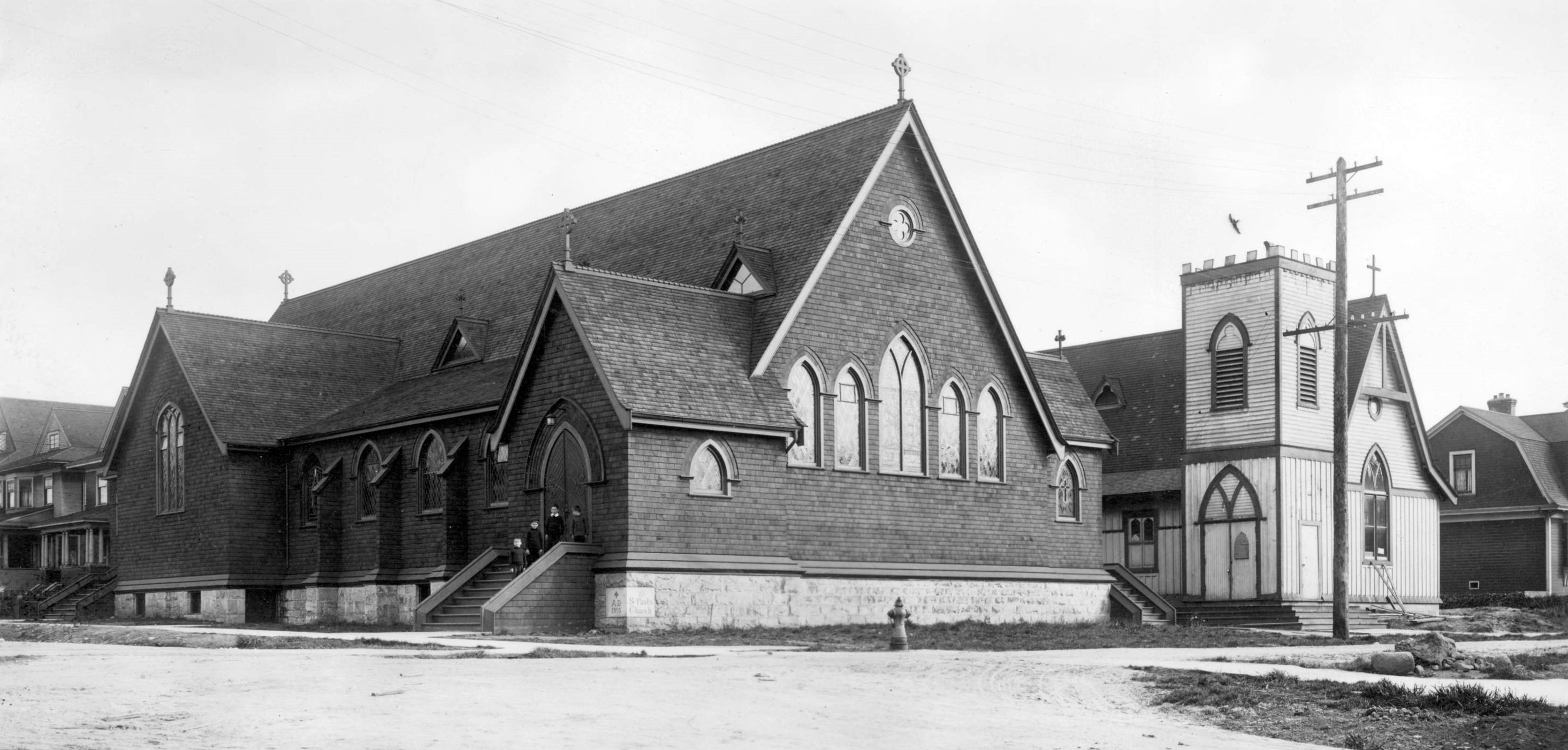
The new church on the site of the old church with the old church re-located alongside to become the parish hall, 1905

The new church was built in Gothic revival style with pointed-arch windows and doors, following the traditional lines of an English parish church, something that would have been familiar to most of the parishioners at the time, or to their parents.

The church had eighteen windows (not including clerestory windows), all except three glazed with leaded lights. Stained glass was fitted in windows on the east wall (portraying St Paul preaching in Athens), the west wall (St Peter with Dorcas doing good works), and the north transept (Faith, Hope and Charity). Between 1952 and 1964, nine more windows were fitted with stained glass, all in some way portraying Christ. Until 1952, the only portrayal of Christ in the church had been a print showing Jesus as a small boy.

The church pipe organ, Opus 264 by Casavant Frères of Québec, is said to be the first to be constructed west of the Rockies.

The old church was replaced by a new parish hall and a rectory in 1911. In 1929, the rectory was re-located to allow the hall to be extended. By then, the site at the corner of Jervis Street and Pendrell Street had assumed its present configuration, except for a wheelchair ramp added in 2002.

Mortgage costs associated with extending the parish hall were exacerbated by the mid-thirties depression. Optimism, and finances, revived after the Second World War and the mortgage was ceremoniously burned in 1945.

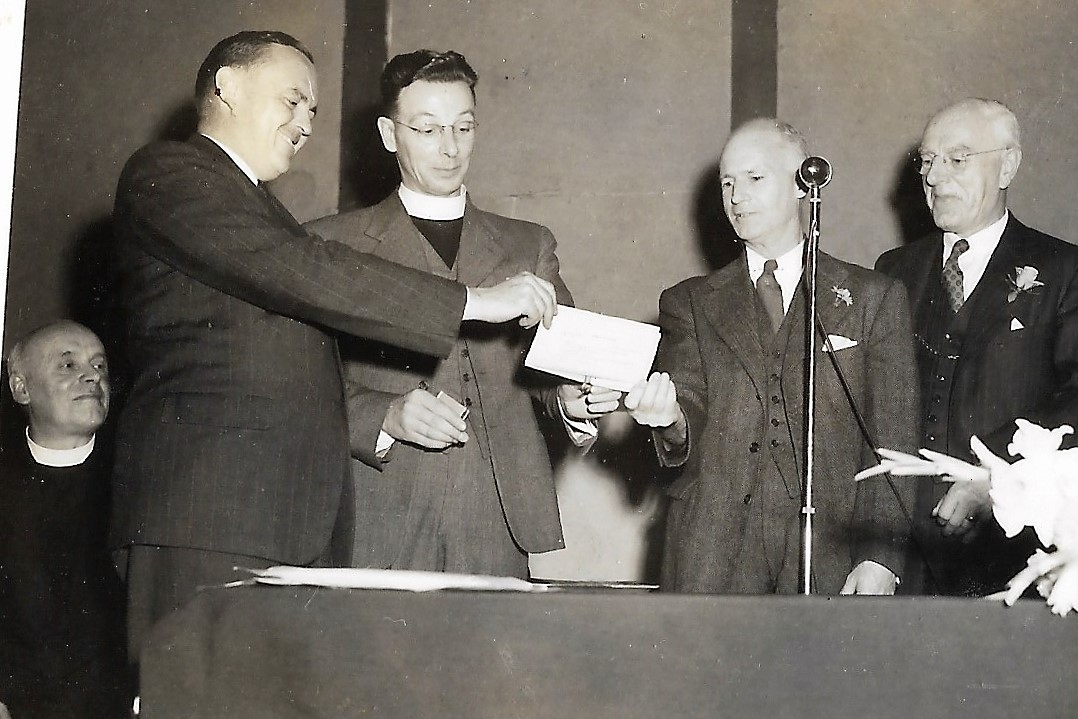
Godfrey Gower (centre) and parish officials burn the mortgage on the parish hall, 1945

During the 1960s a plan to build a car park was frustrated by the City of Vancouver. Instead, the parish built, and in 1973 opened, The Pendrellis, a high-rise apartment building for accommodating seniors at subsidised rents. The initiative had unforeseen consequences. Some thirty-five years later, when the cost of the project had been finally covered by revenues, continuing revenues from The Pendrellis enabled St Paul's to fund the community ministries which it had developed in the meantime.

=== Parish clergy ===
The first rector, Ernest Flewelling (1891 - 1894), was followed by Thomas Outerbridge and Henry Bowers, both briefly, and then by Harold Underhill (1896 - 1908) during whose incumbency the new church was built. He was followed by Adam de Pencier (1908 – 1910), who resigned to become Bishop of New Westminster, then Frederick Chadwick (1910 - 1913) and then the seventh and longest-serving rector, Harold King (1914 - 1944). As the Second World War ended Godfrey Gower (1944 – 1951) became rector, resigning to become Bishop of New Westminster, and he was succeeded by Patrick Ellis (1951 - 1960) and Joseph Ellis (1960 - 1973).

=== Parish activities ===
From its founding, the parish thrived by serving a large and relatively prosperous middle-class membership. The parish followed a traditional Anglican Sunday liturgical pattern of Holy Communion, Morning Prayer and Evensong, and sponsored well-supported educational and social activities like Sunday Schools, Ladies’ and Men's Guilds, scouts and guides and youth groups.

Liturgical practice tended to be conservative. The introduction of a processional cross in 1931 was contentious, and even more so was the introduction of women into the choir in 1933.

== Post-1980 changes ==
As the centennial of the parish approached the eleventh rector, Harold McSherry (1973 - 1984), retired. In the search for his successor, a profile was prepared describing how the character of the West End of Vancouver had changed significantly since the parish had been established. The situation was summarised thus:

"In the 1950s, developers began pulling down the old family houses of the West End to make room for apartment buildings. The composition of the population changed with the changes in residential housing and the population density increased to become one of the highest in Canada. Old-style families were replaced by single-parent families, who were joined by previously unknown (or, at least, unrecognized) residents like gays and lesbians and unmarried couples living together. For most of these persons St Paul’s was perceived as irrelevant, if not invisible, and to some as passively or actively hostile."

In 1985, David Crawley (1985–1990) was appointed rector, setting in process significant reforms of pastoral ministries (particularly the services offered by St Paul's to those who did not count themselves as its members) and liturgical practices (the rituals it used in its forms of worship).

=== New ministries ===
Foremost of all, Crawley initiated a ministry to members of the LGBT community, many of whom were at that time facing the challenges of the AIDS crisis. He and his assistant priest, Neil Gray who became Crawley' successor (1991 - 2003), opened up the parish to the wider community and co-operated with other agencies like St Paul's Hospital and AIDS Vancouver. In reflecting upon this experience, Crawley later wrote: "St Paul's had not so much found a mission as it had regained its soul"

As the AIDS crisis receded, Gray set about consolidating the positive response received from the LGBT community by advocating at the 1998 synod of the Diocese of New Westminster for permission to bless covenanted same-sex relationships. The initiative achieved the immediate success of a favourable vote, but it was not sufficiently favourable to win the consent of Bishop Michael Ingham. Permission was sought again in 2001, with an even more favourable outcome, leading in 2002 to episcopal consent.

The result had repercussions throughout the international Anglican Communion, meriting among other responses a rebuke from the then Archbishop of Canterbury, George Carey. Ingham expressed his own position thus:

"In many places around the world homosexual people are still treated as criminals and even worse, and in some instances with the support of the church. We regret this [. . . ] and express our sadness and disquiet at their suffering, and hope that our actions in this part of the world may bring comfort and relief to those millions of people who look to the church for safety and support instead of judgement and condemnation."

In 1995, St Paul's Advocacy Office was established to provide support and information for people facing problems associated with government benefits, tenancy disputes, immigration, and the like. From its inception, the program has been operated by a salaried director and volunteer associates (most of whom are not members of the parish), conducting as many as four thousand interviews in a year with clients from a wide area.

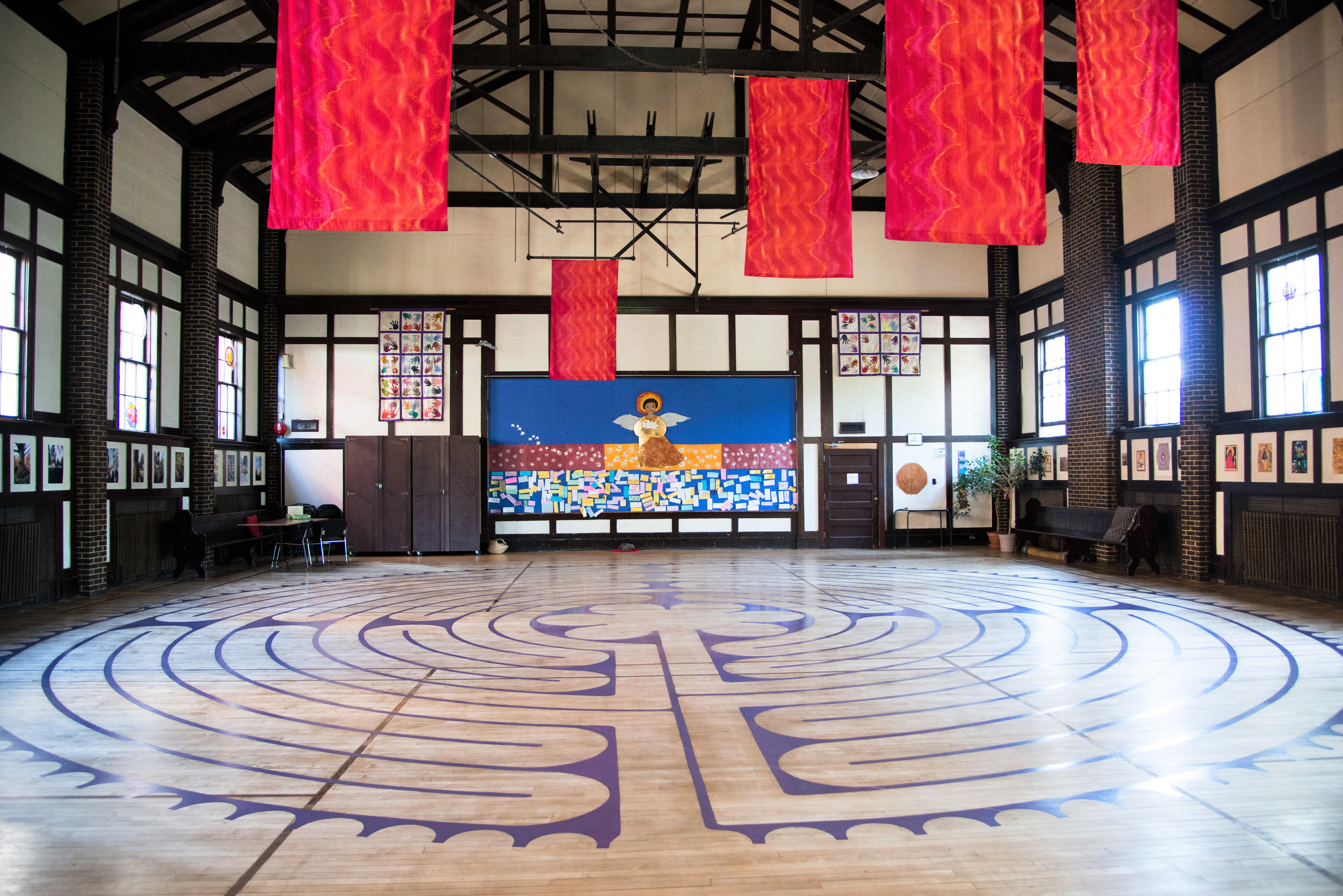
General view of the replica of the Chartres labyrinth painted on the floor of the parish hall

St Paul's played a major role in the re-introduction of labyrinth-walking as a meditative technique. In 1997, under the direction of the then assistant priest, April Stanley, a 13-metre, full-scale replica of the medieval labyrinth found at Chartres Cathedral in France was painted on the floor of the parish hall to become the first permanent indoor labyrinth in Canada. Very soon, the number of individual visits to the labyrinth exceeded four thousand a year, mostly by persons who were not members of St Paul's.

In 2004, the then assistant priest, Dale Yardy, officiated at the first Blessing of a Covenanted Union of a same-sex couple in St Paul's.

In 2008, Gray's successor Markus Dünzkofer (2004 - 2012), together with several other parishioners, all acting as private individuals, incorporated the Our House West Coast Society which operated a residential drug-recovery program. While not a parish ministry as such, St Paul's parishioners gave critical support to the Society during its years of operation.

Dünzkofer introduced Education for Ministry to the parish.

=== Liturgical developments ===
Significant changes to liturgical practices began in 1981 when a contemporary-language Eucharistic rite was used at St Paul's for the first time. In 1986, a Eucharistic celebration additional to the traditional early-morning celebration (using the Book of Common Prayer) was introduced using the Book of Alternative Services. At the same time the Eucharist gradually displaced Morning Prayer at the principal Sunday morning service, Morning Prayer being used for the last time in 1995.

Dünzkofer made decreasing use of the Book of Common Prayer at the principal Sunday morning service, cutting back to three times a year by 2013. In 2014, when Dünzkofer's successor, Jessica Schaap (2013 – 2017), discontinued the early-morning Eucharistic celebration for lack of attendance, regular use of the Book of Common Prayer ceased completely.

A survey of the parishes of the Diocese of New Westminster completed in 2015 suggested that these trends were common throughout the diocese.

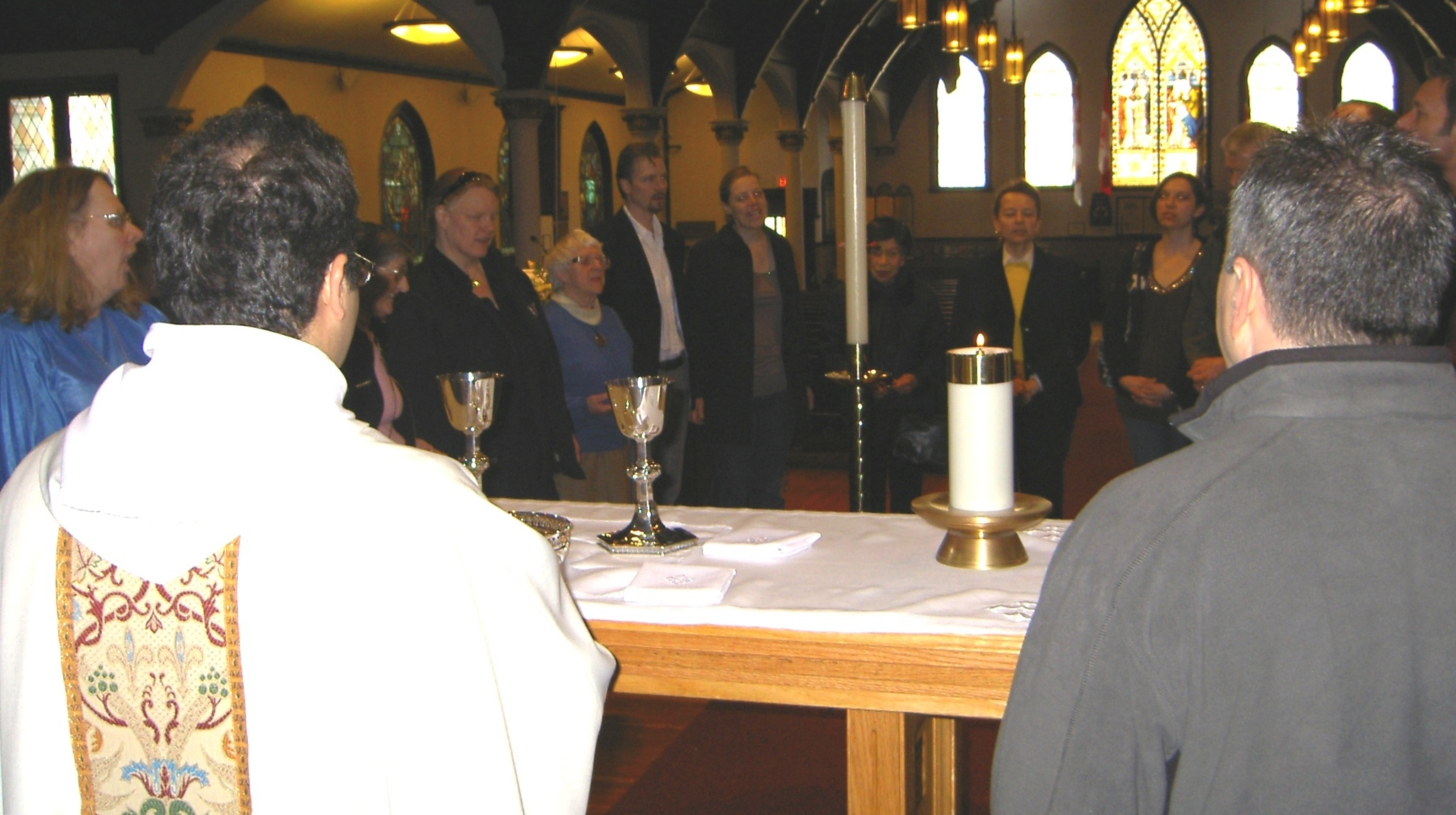
Yazeed Said celebrates Eucharist with the congregation gathered around the altar standing in the chancel

In 1986, Crawley moved the high altar away from the east wall so that the celebrant could face the people. He also introduced a portable altar which could be placed in the chancel or the nave, and he and his successors made increasing use of it for celebrating Eucharist in a more intimate manner.

During this period, icons and votive candles were introduced into the church, and an aumbry was installed allowing for reservation of the consecrated Bread and Wine for use in administering Communion to sick parishioners. Practices like Exchanging the Peace were introduced, together with ceremonies like Washing of Feet on Maundy Thursday, all of which increased the level of participation in the Eucharistic celebration by members of the congregation.

Dünzkofer introduced occasional special services in the Labyrinth, strengthening the link to that part of St Paul's identity.

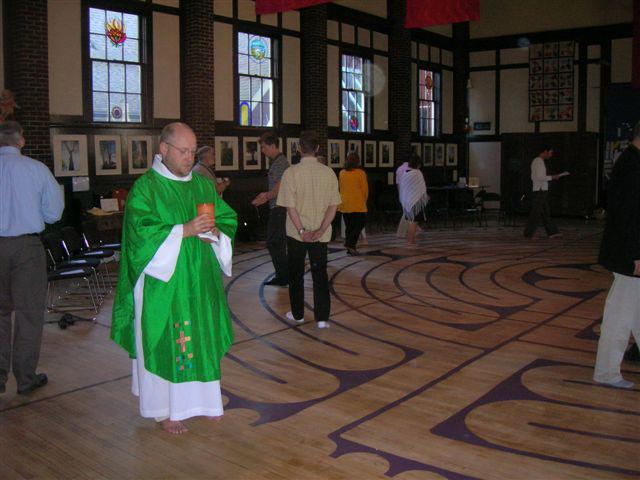
Markus Dünzkofer celebrating Eucharist on the Labyrinth

Of all the developments, the most significant was the changing role of women. In 1976, the then Bishop of New Westminster, David Somerville, ordained women as priests for the first time in the diocese. In 1982, Eucharist was celebrated at St Paul's for the first time by a woman priest, Barbara Blakely. In 1990 a woman, Helen Patterson, was first appointed to the clerical staff, and she was succeeded as assistant priest by several other women. In 2013, Jessica Schaap became the first woman to be appointed rector.

Following the tenure of Jessica Schaap, Philip Cochrane assumed liturgical leadership of the parish (2018–2024). His period of leadership coincided with the COVID-19 pandemic, during which in-person worship was curtailed and replaced by online services. This transition helped offset a temporary decline in membership.

During the same period, the parish’s Advocacy Office was closed following the retirement of its long-serving director, Ellen Silvergieter. The closure was intended to allow for a review of the office’s future direction. A limited continuation of its mission has remained in the form of an income tax preparation service for former and prospective clients.

Cochrane introduced the Centre for Spiritual Reimagination to the parish, a program already in operation in other diocesan contexts. The Centre organizes workshops and events that take place in the upper parish hall, where they share space with regular labyrinth walks and musical evenings.

As of 2025, the parish has seen the addition of new Persian members, many of whom have been baptized and actively participate in parish life. The parish bulletin is now published in both English and Farsi. Outreach initiatives have also included after-service gatherings intended to help newcomers improve conversational English.

== Membership ==
The church was built at a time when church attendance was normal practice, and attendance increased as the population increased. In 1914, for example, the number of Easter communicants (the customary criterion for Anglican membership) reached almost one thousand. The second church had been built to accommodate growing membership, and as late as 1928 the need for more seating remained a topic for debate. The next year, a proposal for a third, larger, church was prepared, but never implemented.

The membership was largely (if not completely) of British origin. Until 1955, St Paul's was part of the Church of England in Canada, a body referred to in a brochure published in 1929 as “the Mother Church of the English-speaking race”.

Since 1955, St Paul's has been part of the then renamed Anglican Church of Canada/l'Eglise anglicane du Canada.

As the 1960s passed, membership fell (in step with those of all mainline churches in Canada) but became more diverse in terms of ethnic origin, maternal language, sexual orientation, gender identity, confessional upbringing, and social class.

The film actress, Yvonne de Carlo sang in the choir when she was young.
