= John Snowden =

John Snowden may refer to:

- John M. Snowden (1776–1845), mayor of Pittsburgh City
- John Snowden (bishop), bishop of Cariboo
- John Snowden (sport shooter) (born 1969), sport shooter from New Zealand
- John Cecil (priest) (1558–1626), alias John Snowden, English Roman Catholic priest and spy
