= John Privett =

Canadian Anglican bishop

John Elswood Privett was the ninth Bishop of Kootenay in the Anglican Church of Canada. From 2009 until April 2018, he served as Metropolitan of British Columbia and the Yukon. He is from Whitehorse, Yukon and was educated at the University of Saskatchewan and ordained in 1982. He retired from active ministry on 31 May 2018.

Privett became a target of criticism from theological conservatives after the provincial House of Bishops declined to consent to the election of the Revd Jacob Worley to succeed William Anderson as Bishop of Caledonia. Worley, formerly a priest of the Anglican Mission in the Americas, had refused to undertake not to attempt to lead the diocese out of the Anglican Church of Canada. In protest, Anderson departed the Anglican Church of Canada for the Anglican Church in North America.

Anglican Communion titles
Preceded by David Perry Crawley	Bishop of Kootenay; 2004–2018	Succeeded by Lynne McNaughton
Preceded by Terrence Owen Buckle	Metropolitan of British Columbia and Yukon; 2010–2018	Succeeded by Melissa Skelton
