= Diocese of Yukon =

Diocese of the Anglican Church in Canada

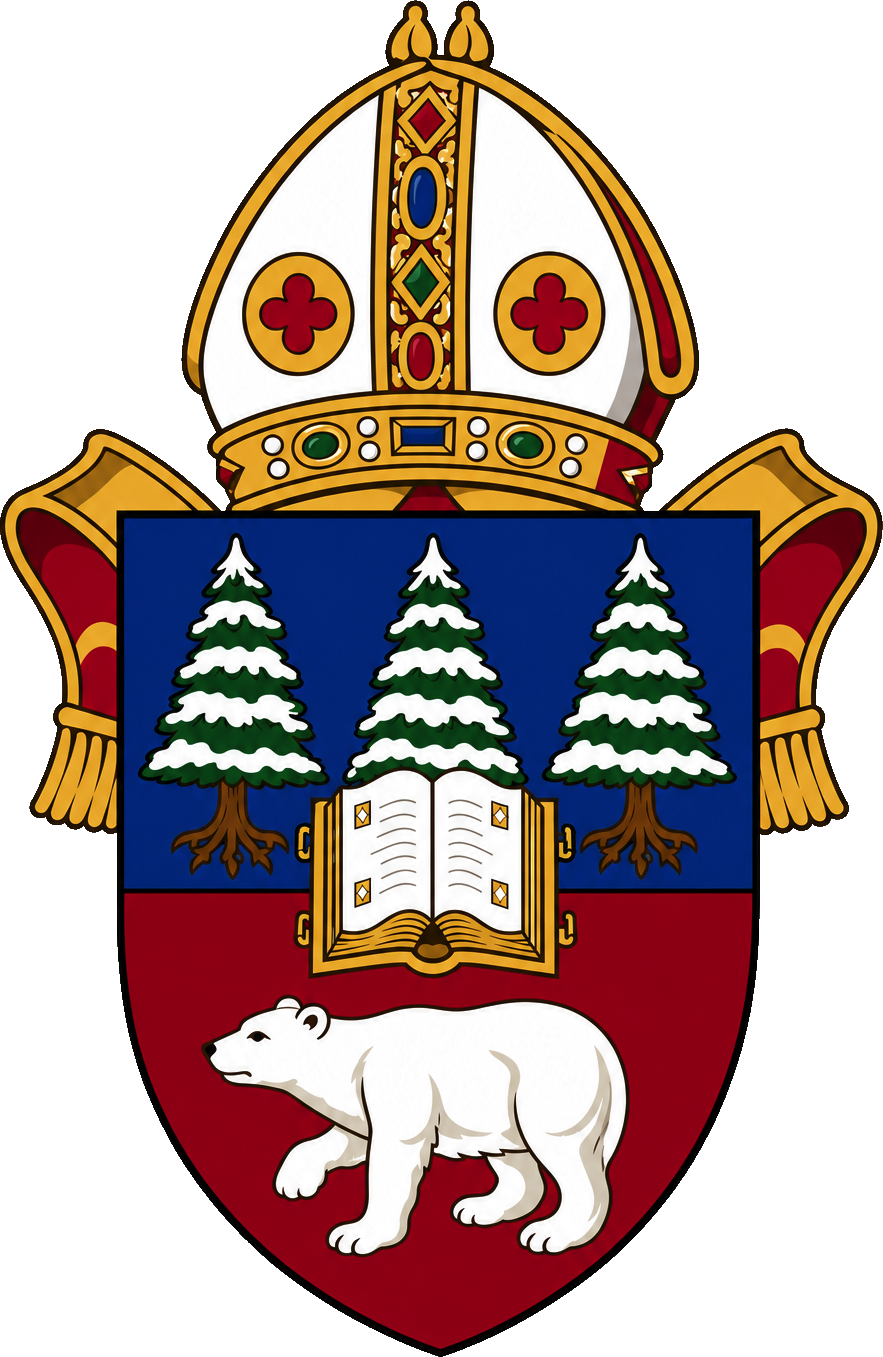

Location
- Ecclesiastical province: British Columbia and Yukon
- Coordinates: 60.7181°N 135.0553°W

Statistics
- Parishes: 13 (2022)
- Members: 963 (2022)

Information
- Rite: Anglican
- Cathedral: Christ Church Cathedral, Whitehorse

Current leadership
- Bishop: Vincent Fenga

Map
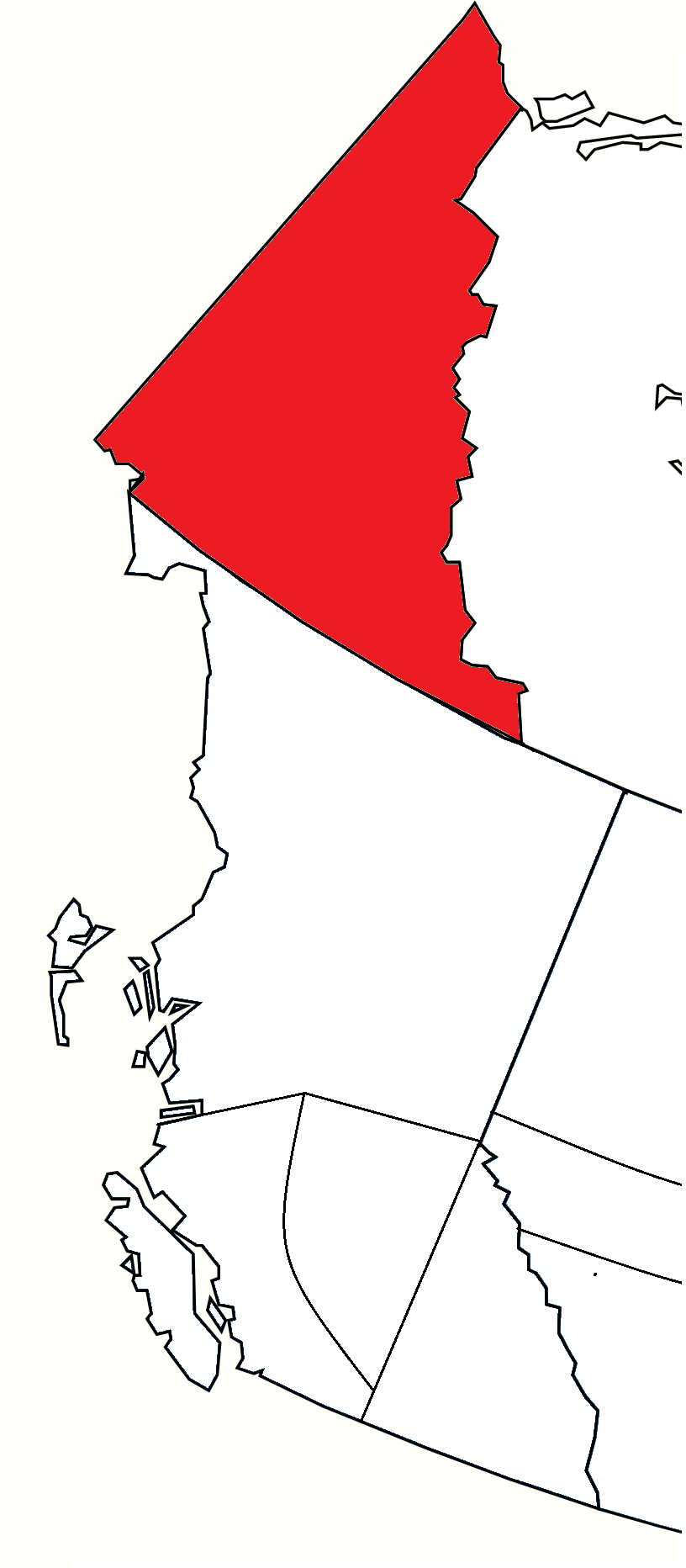
- Location of the diocese within the Ecclesiastical Province of British Columbia and Yukon.

Website
- anglican.yukon.net

The Diocese of Yukon is a diocese of the Ecclesiastical Province of British Columbia and Yukon of the Anglican Church of Canada. It comprises 13 parishes across the Yukon and parts of northern British Columbia.

== History ==
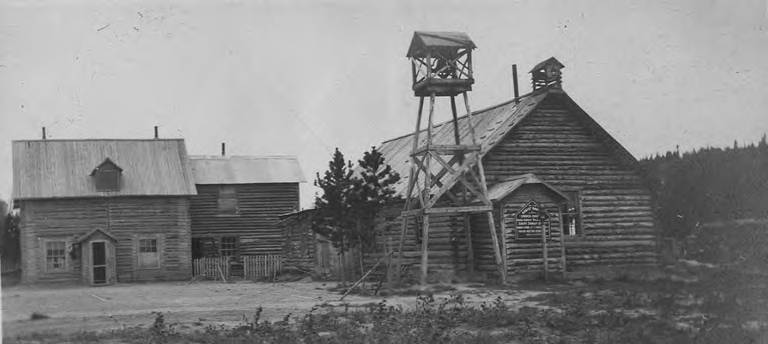
A log Anglican church and parsonage in Whitehorse c. 1905

The Diocese was formed in 1891 when the Diocese of Mackenzie River, at that time in the Province of Rupert's Land, was divided into two. Originally the Diocese of Selkirk, the name of the diocese was changed to Yukon in 1907. It was transferred to its present province in 1947.

Terrence Buckle became the Diocesan bishop in 1995. He was also Metropolitan of the Province of British Columbia and Yukon from 2005–2009. In November 2007 Buckle announced his intention to retire at the end of 2008 but following an inconclusive election synod postponed his retirement plans. He eventually retired in 2010, after the election of Larry Robertson.

On May 15, 2010, Larry D. Robertson, since 1999 suffragan bishop in the western region of the Diocese of the Arctic, was elected Bishop of Yukon. He was installed at Christ Church Cathedral in Whitehorse on September 18, 2010.

On May 4, 2019, Lesley C. Wheeler-Dame was elected as co-adjutor bishop. Wheeler-Dame was consecrated and installed on August 24, 2019. She was the first female to serve as Diocesan bishop. Bishop Vincent Fenga succeeded her on June 19, 2026.

In January 2009, Ronald Ferris, former Bishop of Yukon (1981-1995) and subsequently Bishop of Algoma (1995-2008) resigned from the Anglican Church of Canada to continue as a bishop in the Anglican Network in Canada.

== Bishops of Yukon ==
No.	Name	Dates	Notes
1	William Bompas	1890–1905	Bishop of Selkirk
2	Isaac Stringer	1905–1931	Bishop of Selkirk until 1907; Bishop of Yukon from then onward; translated to Rupert's Land
3	Arthur Sovereign	1932	Translated to Athabasca
4	William Geddes	1934–1947	Translated from Mackenzie River
5	Walter Adams	1947–1952	Translated from Kootenay; Metropolitan of British Columbia and Yukon, 1947–1952
6	Tom Greenwood	1952–1962	
7	Henry Marsh	1962–1967	
8	John Frame	1968–1981	Acting Metropolitan of British Columbia and Yukon, 1973–1975; Dean of Columbia, 1981–1995
9	Ron Ferris	1981–1995	Translated to Algoma
10	Terry Buckle	1995-2010	Metropolitan of British Columbia and Yukon, 2005–2009
11	Larry Robertson	2010–2019	Translated from The Arctic
12	Lesley Wheeler-Dame	2019–2025	
13	Vincent Fenga	2026–present	

== Deans of Yukon ==
Since 1978, the rector of Christ Church Cathedral has also been the dean of Yukon.

No.	Name	Dates	Notes
1	Kenneth Coben Snider	1978–1982	
2	Leonard Mack McFerran	1982–1984	
3	Desmond Fredrick Carroll	1985–2001	
4	John "Peter" Williams	2002–2008	
5	Sean Murphy	2010–2019	Also archdeacon of Liard
6	Harold "Bert" A. Chestnut	2019–2022	
7	Vincent Fenga	2023–present	Elected 13th bishop of Yukon
