= Michael Ingham (bishop) =

Canadian bishop (born 1949)

The Right Reverend Michael Ingham
- 8th Anglican Bishop of New Westminster
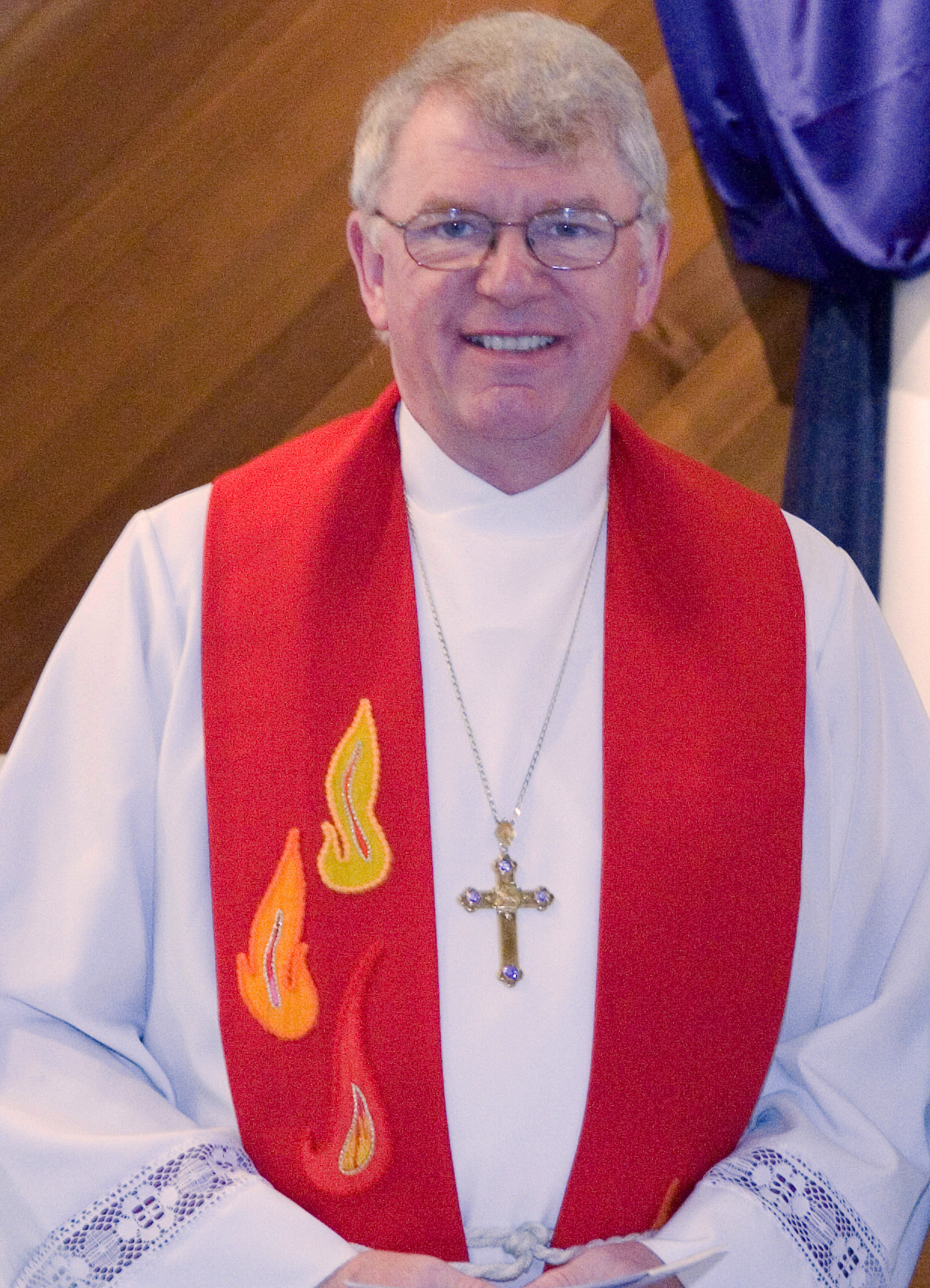
- Ingham in 2009
- Church: Anglican Church of Canada
- Province: British Columbia and Yukon
- Diocese: New Westminster
- Installed: January 9, 1994
- Term ended: August 31, 2013
- Predecessor: Douglas Hambidge
- Successor: Melissa M. Skelton

Orders
- Ordination: 1974
- Consecration: 1994

Personal details
- Born: 1949 (age 76–77) Yorkshire, England

Michael Ingham (born 1949 in Yorkshire) is a retired bishop, theologian in the Anglican Church of Canada. From January 9, 1994 to August 31, 2013, he was the eighth Bishop of the Diocese of New Westminster of the Anglican Church of Canada, located in the Lower Mainland of British Columbia.

Ingham studied at the University of Edinburgh, where he received a master's degree in politics and philosophy, and a Bachelor of Divinity degree. Subsequently, he undertook postgraduate studies at Harvard University and the Hebrew University of Jerusalem. In 1974, Ingham was ordained in the Anglican Diocese of Ottawa, and served in parishes there and in the Diocese of New Westminster before serving as principal secretary to the then-Primate of the Anglican Church of Canada, Michael Peers.

In 1992, Ingham returned to Vancouver to serve as the Rector of Christ Church Cathedral and Dean of New Westminster, before being elected Bishop of New Westminster in 1994. Ingham is the author of two books, Rites for a New Age, an introduction to the Book of Alternative Services, and Mansions of the Spirit, focusing on interfaith dialogue. Ingham has been actively involved in inter-religious cooperation as an active member of the United Religions Initiative.

Ingham has been the subject of extensive media focus due to his diocese's decision in 2002 to institute the blessing of same-sex unions, which has sparked controversy within the Anglican Communion.

== Published works ==
- Ingham, Michael (1986). Rites for a New Age: Understanding the Book of Alternative Services. Toronto: ABC Publishing. ISBN 978-0-919891-52-4.
- — (1997). Mansions of the Spirit: The Gospel in a Multi-Faith World. Toronto: ABC Publishing. ISBN 978-1-55126-185-0.

== See also ==
- Windsor Report
- St. Michael Report
- Blessing of same-sex unions in Christian churches
