= Harold Sexton =

Anglican bishop

Harold Eustace Sexton (14 May 1888 – 29 March 1972) was an eminent Anglican bishop in the mid-20th century.

He was educated at St Peter's College, Adelaide and Keble College, Oxford and ordained in 1912. After curacies at St Paul's, Port Adelaide and All Saints, Hindmarsh he was a Chaplain with the BEF during the First World War. From 1920 he held incumbencies at St Martin's, Hawksburn and All Saints, Upper Norwood before being appointed Bishop Coadjutor of British Columbia in 1935. A year later he became the diocesan bishop, and in 1952 Archbishop of British Columbia. He relinquished both posts in 1969 and died three years later.

Anglican Communion titles
Preceded by Charles Schofield	Bishop of British Columbia; 1936–1969	Succeeded by John Anderson
Preceded by Walter Adams	Archbishop of British Columbia; 1952–1969	Succeeded by Godfrey Gower
