= David Somerville =

David Somerville is the name of:

- David Somerville (judoka) (born 1974), Scottish judoka
- David Somerville (bishop) (1915–2011), Anglican bishop in Canada
- Dave Somerville (1933–2015), Canadian singer
