= Frederic Stanford =

Canadian Anglican bishop

Frederic Stanford (1883 – 3 January 1964) was the fourth Bishop of Cariboo.

He was educated at King's College London and ordained in 1908. After curacies at All Souls, Grosvenor Park, Camberwell and St Chad's, Regina he was Rector of St Peter's, Regina until 1928. He was Principal of Gordon's Indian School, Punnichy from 1928 to 1931 and after that Vicar of Windermere until 1942. In 1943 he was appointed to the episcopate and served for a decade.

Church of England titles
Preceded by Samuel Pollinger	Bishop of Cariboo; 1943–1953	Succeeded by Ralph Dean
