= Douglas Hambidge =

Canadian Anglican bishop (1927–2026)

Douglas Walter Hambidge (6 March 1927 – 2 March 2026) was a Canadian Anglican clergyman who was the seventh Bishop of Caledonia and New Westminster; and ninth Metropolitan of British Columbia.

== Biography ==
Hambidge was born in London, England on 6 March 1927, educated at London University, and ordained in 1953. After a curacy at St Mark's, Dalston he held incumbencies in Canada at Cassiar, Smithers and Fort St John. In 1969, he was elected as Bishop of Caledonia and in 1980 was elected as Bishop and translated to the Diocese of New Westminster. In 1981, he became Metropolitan of British Columbia, resigning in 1993. From then until his retirement he was Principal, St Mark's Theological College and an Assistant Bishop in Dar es Salaam. Hambidge died on 2 March 2026, aged 98.

Anglican Communion titles
Preceded by Eric George Munn	Bishop of Caledonia; 1969–1980	Succeeded by John Edward Hannen
Preceded by Thomas David Somerville	Bishop of New Westminster; 1980–1993	Succeeded by Michael Ingham
Preceded by Thomas David Somerville	Metropolitan of British Columbia; 1981–1993	Succeeded by David Perry Crawley
