= Diocese of Cariboo =

Former Diocese of the Anglican Church in Canada

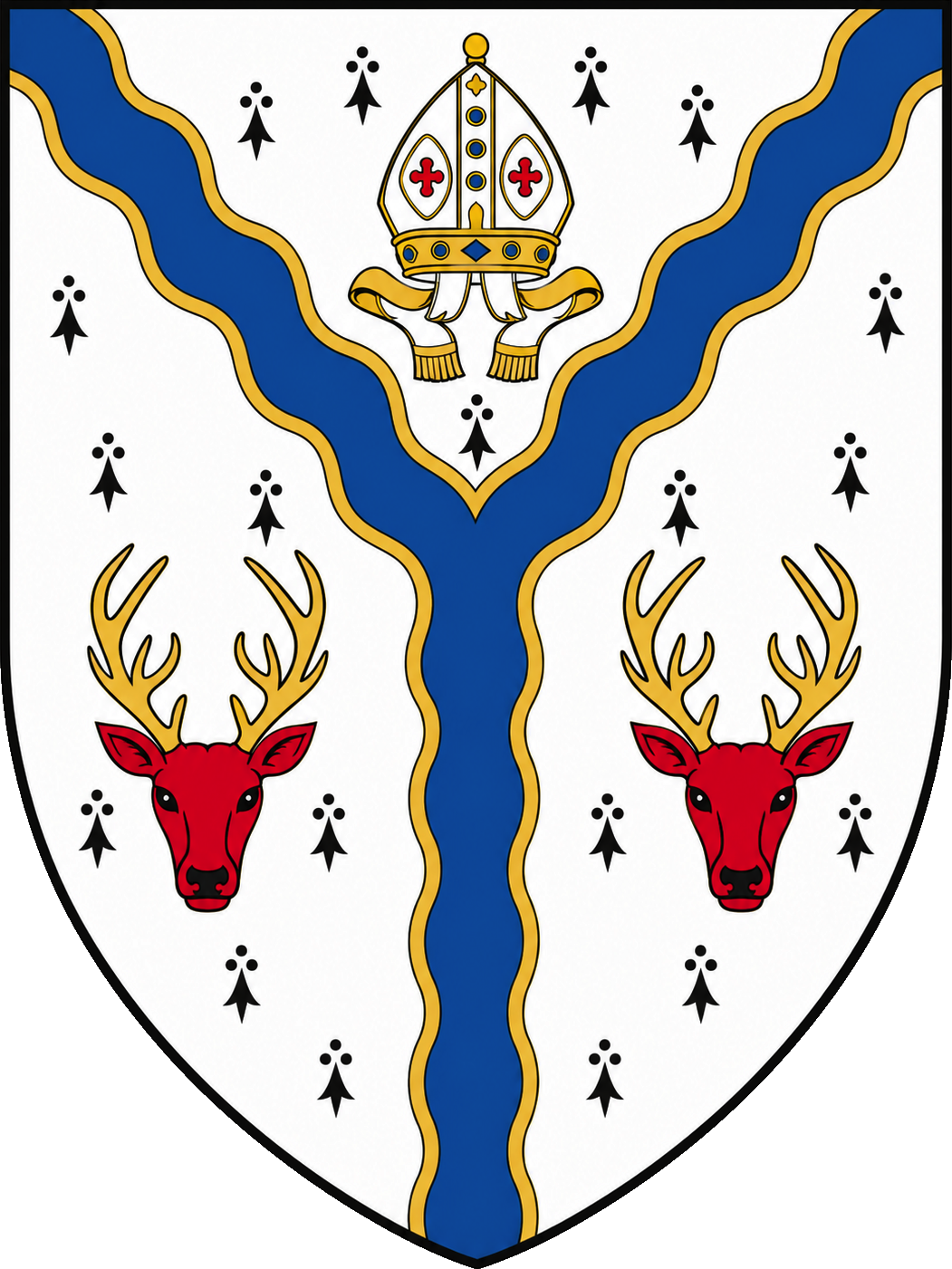

Location
- Ecclesiastical province: Province of British Columbia and Yukon

Information
- Rite: Anglican Church of Canada

The Diocese of Cariboo was a diocese of the Ecclesiastical Province of British Columbia and the Yukon of the Anglican Church of Canada. Incorporated in 1914, the diocese ceased operations on December 31, 2001 when the financial strain of legal costs from third party claims made by the Government of Canada, associated with damage suits brought by former students of the Anglican-run St George's Indian Residential School in Lytton, B.C., exhausted the diocese financially.

The parishes of the former Diocese of Cariboo were formed into the Anglican Parishes of the Central Interior and were overseen by a Suffragan Bishop to the Metropolitan. Barbara Andrews, formerly Director of the Sorrento Retreat and Conference Centre in British Columbia, was elected Suffragan Bishop for the APCI on 30 June 2009 in succession to Gordon Light who served from 2004 to 2008. Andrews was consecrated at St. Paul's Cathedral (Kamloops), on October 18, 2009.

The future organisational arrangements for the Anglican Parishes of the Central Interior are under investigation by the new bishop, who has identified a clear desire for autonomy on the part of the constituent parishes while appreciating the controversial nature of the re-establishment of a diocesan model. In 2016 the APCI reorganized itself into the Territory of the People.

== Bishops of the Diocese of Cariboo ==
From 1914 to 1925 the diocesan was Adam de Pencier, Bishop of Cariboo with New Westminster, until a sufficient endowment was raised for the election of the 1st Bishop of Cariboo.

- Walter Adams, first Bishop of Cariboo, 1925–1934
- George Wells, second Bishop of Cariboo, 1934–1941
- Samuel Pollinger, third Bishop of Cariboo, 1941–1943
- Frederic Stanford, fourth Bishop of Cariboo, 1943–1953
- Ralph Dean, fifth Bishop of Cariboo, 1953–1973 (on leave as Executive Officer of the Anglican Communion, 1964–1969; Metropolitan of the Province of British Columbia and the Yukon, 1971–1973)
  - Tom Greenwood, Assistant Bishop, 1965–1969
- John Snowden, sixth Bishop of Cariboo, 1974–1991
- Jim Cruickshank, seventh Bishop of Cariboo, 1992–2001

Source: Archives of the Diocese of Cariboo
