= Terry Buckle =

Canadian Anglican bishop (1940–2020)

The Right Reverend Terry Buckle
- Archbishop of Yukon
- Diocese: Yukon
- Term ended: 2010
- Other post: Archbishop of BC & Yukon

Orders
- Ordination: 1962 - Evangelist 1973 - priest
- Consecration: 1993

Personal details
- Born: 24 August 1940 Simcoe, Ontario, Canada
- Died: 10 September 2020 (aged 80) Whitehorse, Yukon, Canada
- Spouse: Blanche Buckle

Terrence Owen Buckle (24 August 1940 – 10 September 2020) was a Canadian Anglican bishop. He was Archbishop of Yukon from 1995 to 2010 and Metropolitan of British Columbia and Yukon from 2005 until 2010, in the Anglican Church of Canada.

== Ecclesiastical career ==
He was born on 24 August 1940 and educated at the Church Army Training College, Canada and Wycliffe College, Toronto. Commissioned as a Church Army Evangelist in 1962 he was Parish Assistant at St Philip's, Etobicoke and then Director of Inner Parish, Little Trinity, Toronto until 1966. He was the Church Army Incumbent at the Church of the Resurrection, Holman (1966–1970); St George's Anglican Mission, Cambridge Bay (1970–1972); and St David's Anglican Mission, Fort Simpson (1972–1975). He was ordained deacon in May 1973 and priest in November 1973. He was Priest in charge at the Church of the Ascension, Inuvik (and Regional Dean of Lower Mackenzie from 1975 to 1982) then Archdeacon of Liard until 1988. He was Rector of Holy Trinity, Yellowknife from 1988 to 1993 when he was elevated to the episcopate as Bishop Suffragan of the Arctic. Two years later he became Bishop of Yukon and a decade after that Metropolitan of British Columbia and Yukon.

Since retirement, Buckle continued to speak around the country and served on the Board of Directors for Threshold Ministries and Anglican Renewal Ministries.

In June 2018, he relinquished the exercise of ministry in the Anglican Church of Canada and was received into the Anglican Network in Canada, a diocese of the Anglican Church in North America. He continued to live and serve in Whitehorse, Yukon, as a retired bishop until his death on 10 September 2020.

Anglican Communion titles
Preceded by Ronald Curry Ferris	Bishop of Yukon; 1995–2005	Succeeded by Larry Robertson
Preceded by David Perry Crawley	Metropolitan of British Columbia; Archbishop of Yukon; 2005–2009	Succeeded by John Elswood Privett
