= Fraser Berry =

Canadian Anglican bishop

- Born: 21 January 1926; Ottawa, Ontario
- Died: 25 October 2011 (aged 85); Kelowna, British Columbia
- Style: The Right Reverend

Robert Edward Fraser Berry (1926-2011) was an Anglican bishop in the 20th century.

Berry was born in Ottawa on 21 January 1926 and educated at Sir George Williams College, McGill University and Montreal Diocesan Theological College.

He was ordained in 1953 and began his career as an Assistant Priest at Christ Church Cathedral, Victoria, BC. After this he held incumbencies at St Margaret's, Hamilton, Ontario, St Mark's, Orangeville, St Luke's, Winnipeg and St Michael and All Angels, Kelowna.

In 1971, he was elected as the 7th Bishop of Kootenay, a post he held until his retirement in 1989.

He died on 25 October 2011 in Kelowna, British Columbia.

Religious titles
Preceded by Edward Walter Scott	Bishop of Kootenay; 1971–1989	Succeeded by David Perry Crawley
