= George Wells (bishop) =

Second Bishop of Cariboo

George Anderson Wells CMG was the second Bishop of Cariboo. He was born at Clarke's Beach, Newfoundland on 18 November 1877, educated at St John's College, Winnipeg (where he was later Warden) and ordained in 1911. He died on 10 April 1964.

During the Second World War, Wells was Chaplain of the Fleet (Protestant) in the Royal Canadian Navy.

== Notes ==
Church of England titles
Preceded by Walter Adams	Bishop of Cariboo; 1934–1940	Succeeded by Samuel Pollinger
