= Larry Robertson (bishop) =

Canadian Anglican bishop

Larry Robertson is a Canadian Anglican bishop. He was the Bishop of Yukon from 2010 to 2019. He had previously served in the Diocese of The Arctic for 34 years.

Religious titles
Preceded by Terrence Owen Buckle	Bishop of Yukon; 2010–2019	Succeeded by Lesley Wheeler-Dame
