= John Frame (bishop) =

Canadian Anglican bishop (1930–2017)

John Timothy Frame (8 December 1930 – August 4, 2017) was the eighth Bishop of Yukon and acting Metropolitan of British Columbia.

Frame was educated at the University of Toronto and ordained in 1957. He was at Burns Lake Mission, Caledonia until his ordination to the episcopate in 1968. In 1973 he became Metropolitan of British Columbia, resigning in 1980. From then, until his retirement in 1995, he was the Rector of Christ Church Cathedral, Victoria and Dean of Columbia.

Anglican Communion titles
Preceded by Tom Greenwood	Bishop of Yukon; 1968– 1980	Succeeded by Ron Ferris
Preceded by Ralph Stanley Dean	Acting Metropolitan of British Columbia; 1973 – 1975	Succeeded by Thomas David Somerville
Preceded by Brian William Whitlow	Dean of Columbia; 1981–1995	Succeeded by John Wright
