= Philip Beattie =

Anglican bishop (1912–1960)

The Right Reverend Philip Beattie

Personal details
- Born: 26 March 1912
- Died: 9 September 1960 (aged 48) Kelowna, British Columbia, Canada

Philip Rodger Beattie was an Anglican bishop in the 20th century.

Beattie was educated at the University of Toronto and ordained in 1936. He was Secretary of the SCM until 1940 and then a World War II Chaplain in the RCAF. After peace returned he served incumbencies at Sudbury and St. Catharines. From 1952 to 1955 he was Rector of Christ Church Cathedral, Victoria and Dean of Columbia before being consecrated as the fourth Bishop of Kootenay in 1955. He died in post on 9 September 1960.

== See also ==
Anglican Communion titles
Preceded by George Calvert	Dean of Columbia; 1952–1955	Succeeded by Brian William Whitlow
Preceded by Patrick Clark	Bishop of Kootenay; 1955–1960	Succeeded by Bill Coleman
