= Patrick Clark (bishop) =

Canadian Anglican bishop

- Born: 7 March 1908
- Died: 16 December 1954 (aged 46); Kelowna, British Columbia
- Title: Right Reverend

Frederick Patrick Clark (7 March 1908 – 16 December 1954) was a Canadian Anglican clergyman who served as the Bishop of Kootenay from 1948 until his death.

Clark was educated at Bishop's University and ordained in 1933. He was Curate at Church of Advent in Westmount, Quebec and then at St Peter in Regina, Saskatchewan. After this he held incumbencies at Pense and Vancouver. From 1945 to 1948 he was Dean of Kootenay and then its bishop. He died in post on 16 December 1954. There is a memorial to him at St Andrew in Trail, British Columbia.

Religious titles
Preceded by Walter Robert Adams	Bishop of Kootenay; 1948–1954	Succeeded by Philip Rodger Beattie
