= Bill Coleman (bishop) =

Canadian Anglican bishop

The Right Reverend Bill Coleman

Personal details
- Born: 16 August 1917
- Died: 21 July 1992 (aged 74) Newboro

William Robert Coleman (16 August 1917 – 21 July 1992) was an Anglican bishop in the 20th century.

Coleman was educated at the University of Toronto and ordained in 1943. He began his career with a curacy at the Church of the Epiphany, Sudbury. then its Priest in charge 1943–45. He was then successively Professor of Religious Philosophy and Ethics at Wycliffe College, Dean of Divinity at Bishop's University and Principal of Huron College. In 1961 he became Bishop of Kootenay, a post he held for four years.

== See also ==
Religious titles
Preceded by Philip Beattie	Bishop of Kootenay; 1961–1965	Succeeded by Ted Scott
