= Samuel Pollinger =

Anglican bishop (1868–1943)

The Rt Rev.Samuel Pollinger was the third Bishop of Cariboo.
He was born in 1868 and ordained in 1908. He served first at Quesnel and then Prince George before his elevation to the episcopate.
He died in March 1943.

== Notes ==
Church of England titles
Preceded by George Anderson Wells	Bishop of Cariboo; 1942 – 1943	Succeeded by Frederic Stanford
