= Walter Adams (bishop) =

British Anglican bishop

The Most Reverend Walter Robert Adams
- Archbishop of Yukon
- Adams in 1925
- Church: Anglican Church of Canada
- Province: British Columbia and Yukon
- Diocese: Yukon
- Installed: 1947
- Term ended: 1952
- Predecessor: William "Archibald" Geddes
- Successor: Tom Greenwood
- Other posts: Bishop of Cariboo; Bishop of Kootenay; Metropolitan of British Columbia and Yukon

Orders
- Ordination: 1901 as deacon 1905 as priest

Personal details
- Born: 1 September 1877 London, England
- Died: 25 July 1957 (aged 79) Vancouver, British Columbia, Canada

Walter Robert Adams (1 September 1877 – 25 July 1957) was a British Anglican bishop.

Adams was born in London and studied for eight years at Ardingly College before moving to Hurstpierpoint College for Sixth Form. A first class honours mathematical scholar at Durham University (University College), he was ordained as a deacon in 1901 and as a priest in 1905. Adams served as president of the Durham Union for Epiphany term of 1899.

Curacies in County Durham and Lambeth were followed by five years as a missionary priest in Saskatchewan, Canada. Returning to England, he was appointed assistant secretary to the Archbishop of Canterbury. This was followed by an academic career.

In 1925 Adams returned to Canada as the first bishop of Cariboo (1925–1934). In 1933 he was elected Bishop of Kootenay (1934–1947) and for two years, 1933–1934, he looked after both dioceses (Cariboo and Kootenay). In 1942 he became the third metropolitan of British Columbia (1942–1951) while continuing his diocesan positions. In 1947 he became Archbishop of Yukon (1947–1952) and subsequently Archbishop of British Columbia after the diocese was transferred from Rupert's Land to British Columbia. He was also acting primate of the Anglican Church of Canada (1947 and 1950–1951). He relinquished his duties in 1952 and retired in Vernon, Canada, where he lived until he died in 1957.

Anglican Communion titles
New title	Bishop of Cariboo; 1925 – 1934	Succeeded by George Wells
Preceded by Alexander Doull	Bishop of Kootenay; Archbishop of Kootenay from 1942; 1933 – 1947	Succeeded by Patrick Clark
Preceded by William Geddes	Archbishop of Yukon; 1947 – 1952	Succeeded by Tom Greenwood
Preceded by Adam de Pencier	Metropolitan of British Columbia and Yukon; 1942 – 1951	Succeeded by Harold Sexton
