= David Crawley (bishop) =

Canadian Anglican archbishop (1937–2025)

The Most Reverend David Crawley
- Archbishop of Kootenay; Metropolitan of British Columbia and Yukon
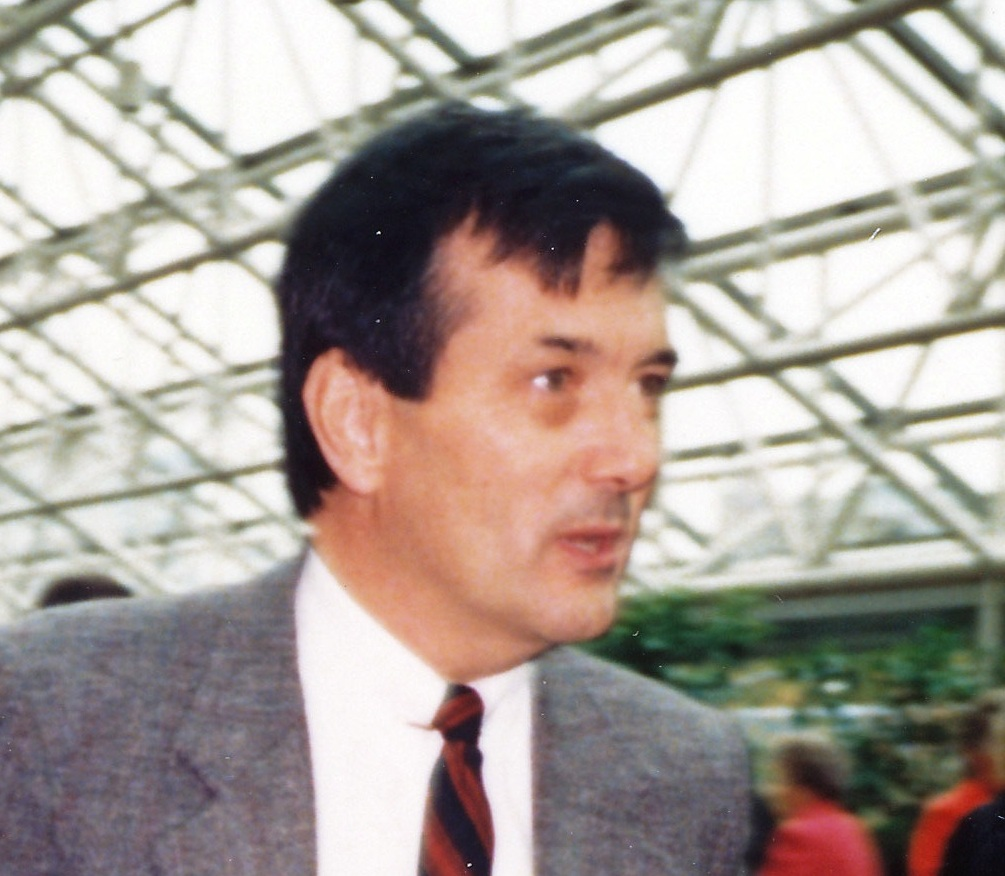
- Crawley in 1986
- Church: Anglican Church of Canada
- Province: British Columbia and Yukon
- Diocese: Kootenay
- In office: 1990–2004 (as bishop); 1994–2004 (as metropolitan)
- Predecessor: Douglas Hambidge
- Successor: Terry Buckle
- Previous post: Rector of St. Paul's, Vancouver (1985–1990)

Orders
- Ordination: 1962
- Consecration: 1994

Personal details
- Born: July 26, 1937
- Died: August 17, 2025 (aged 88) Kelowna, British Columbia, Canada
- Denomination: Anglicanism
- Spouse: Joan Bubbs
- Children: 3
- Education: St. John's College, Manitoba; University of Kent

David Perry Crawley (July 26, 1937 – August 17, 2025) was a Canadian Anglican bishop. He was archbishop of Kootenay from 1990 to 2004 and metropolitan of British Columbia and Yukon from 1994 to 2004.

== Early life and education ==
Crawley was born on July 26, 1937, the son of the Rev. Canon George Antony Crawley and Lucy Lillian Ball, and educated at the University of Manitoba and the University of Kent at Canterbury. He was ordained in 1961 and was the incumbent at St Thomas', Sherwood Park until 1966.

== Ordained ministry ==
Crawley was canon missioner at All Saints Cathedral, Edmonton from 1967 until 1970 and rector of St Matthew's, Winnipeg from 1971 until 1977. He was archdeacon of Winnipeg from 1974 to 1977 and of Rupert's Land until 1981. He was a lecturer at St John's College, Winnipeg from 1981 to 1982 after that rector of St Michael and All Angels, Regina (1982–85).

In 1985 he became the twelfth rector of St. Paul's, Vancouver where he sought to heal the relationship between the parish and the local LGBT community and to minister to the members of that community who were at the time dealing with the AIDS crisis. He wrote an account of his experiences in A parish transformed. In 1990 he resigned his position at St Paul's on being elected to the episcopate (as Bishop of Kootenay) in 1990.

In 1990, he was elected and installed as bishop of Kootenay. He was elected metropolitan of British Columbia and Yukon and served in both roles concurrently until his retirement in November 2004. He was acting primate of the Anglican Church of Canada for several months in 2004 between the retirement of Michael Peers and the General Synod where Andrew Hutchison was elected.

== Later life and death ==
Crawley was twice married and had three daughters. He died on August 17, 2025, at the age of 88.

Anglican Communion titles
Preceded by Fraser Berry	Bishop of Kootenay; 1990–2004	Succeeded by John Privett
Preceded by Douglas Hambidge	Metropolitan of British Columbia and Yukon; 1994–2004	Succeeded by Terry Buckle
