= Christ Church Cathedral (Whitehorse) =

Church in Canada

Coordinates: 60°43′05″N 135°03′18″W

Christ Church Cathedral is the Anglican cathedral of the Diocese of Yukon in Whitehorse, Yukon.
