= Lynne McNaughton =

Anglican bishop

The Most Reverend Lynne McNaughton
- Bishop of Kootenay
- Church: Anglican Church of Canada
- Province: Ecclesiastical Province of British Columbia and Yukon
- Diocese: Anglican Diocese of Kootenay
- In office: 2019–present
- Predecessor: John Privett
- Other post: Metropolitan of British Columbia and Yukon (2021–2024)

Orders
- Ordination: 1987 (priesthood)
- Consecration: May 16, 2019 by Melissa M. Skelton

Personal details
- Born: Peace River, Alberta

Lynne Elizabeth McNaughton is the tenth bishop of Kootenay, a diocese in the Anglican Church of Canada, and was the 13th metropolitan of the Ecclesiastical Province of British Columbia and Yukon.

== Early life and education ==
McNaughton was born in Peace River, Alberta and educated at the University of Alberta, Vancouver School of Theology and Columbia Theological Seminary.

== Ordained ministry ==
She was ordained in 1987, and served in the Diocese of New Westminster until her episcopal election. Her last post was Rector of St. Clement, North Vancouver.

=== Episcopal ministry ===
The Rev. Dr. Lynne McNaughton, as she then was, was elected the tenth bishop of Kootenay on January 19, 2019 at the Cathedral Church of St. Michael and All Angels in Kelowna, B.C. She was consecrated and installed on May 16, 2019.

On March 6, 2021, she was elected Metropolitan of the Ecclesiastical Province of British Columbia and Yukon; an office that comes with the title archbishop. She was elected by the members of the provincial house of bishops and the electoral college of the province on the first ballot. She is the second woman to become the Metropolitan of the Ecclesiastical Province of British Columbia and Yukon. The first was her predecessor, the Most Reverend Melissa M. Skelton, who retired on February 28, 2021. She resigned as metropolitan, effective the same day, on November 22, 2024.

Anglican Communion titles
Preceded by John Privett	Bishop of Kootenay; 2019–present	Incumbent
Preceded by Melissa Skelton	Metropolitan of British Columbia and Yukon; 2021–2024	Succeeded by John Stephens
