= Tom Greenwood (bishop) =

Anglican Bishop

Tom Greenwood (born 1 January 1903 - 1 February 1974) was an Anglican bishop.

== Early life ==
Tom Greenwood was born in Luddenden, Yorkshire, England, in 1903 and grew up in the local Church of England, St. Mary's Church, where he sang in the choir. He was the son of Mitchell Greenwood, a pub manager, and Ellen Broadbent. His mother died in childbirth when Tom was 2 years old, and although he came from a large loving family, after the loss of his mother, some years of family instability followed. From an early age Tom knew that he wanted to serve in the church but had no idea how that could happen. His education was disrupted at 13 years when he began half-time work in a clothing factory although he was able to continue his education half-time as well. At 17 years he began two years of working for the local railway, excelling at administrative tasks.

== Church career and life ==
At 19 years old, he began his training with the Church Army in London. He had heard about Church Army as a child and was inspired by a young Church Army captain who worked in his home area. The ministry involved two years of travelling around England leading parish missions. He excelled at leadership and choral ability, and his skills led to his next opportunities. In 1926, Church Army asked him to travel to the U.S.A. to help the fledgling Church Army there with summer missions. He travelled throughout the southern states and New England leading evangelical missions for four summers. It was in Vermont, during this time, that he met his future wife. During these experiences, he decided to study for the priesthood.

With the support of his Bishop, the Bishop of Durham, he attended Knutsford Ordination Test School in Cheshire to achieve his GED. He then applied to enter the U.S.A. to study theology, with a full scholarship. He was refused entry to the U.S.A., and quickly turned to his Church Army connections in Canada. He was sponsored by the Bishop of the Arctic to continue his education at the University of Trinity College, graduating with an L.Th. He was ordained priest in 1934. and then was posted to the Arctic Mission at Fort McPherson, N.W.T.

In 1934, before going north, Tom Greenwood married Isabel Dunham Gilbert, an American he had met earlier, who graduated with an M.D. from McGill University Faculty of Medicine in 1935, and then joined Tom In Fort McPherson. Isabel practiced as a family doctor in Fort McPherson, delivering babies and tending to patients or referring them to larger hospitals in Edmonton. She joined her husband visiting the winter and summer camps of the Gwitchin peoples based in Fort McPherson.

Tom was Priest-in-charge of the Arctic Mission at Fort McPherson from 1934 to 1936 and then, leaving the north, he was Curate in St. Paul, Minnesota before returning to England where he was Curate at the Church of St John the Baptist Greenhill, Harrow from 1937 to 1939. Later in 1939 he went to St Peter's, Hale, Greater Manchester where he was Vicar until 1946 - after the end of World War II. In 1946 he returned to Canada to be the Rector of St. John's Anglican Church, Fort McMurray, AB (1946-49) and then of Holy Trinity Church, Yellowknife (1949–1952).

In 1952, Tom was elected and consecrated as the sixth Anglican Bishop of Yukon, and served there from 1952 to 1961. In September 1952, Trinity College awarded him an Honorary Doctor of Divinity degree. Over those ten years, Tom undertook significant re-building of the Anglican church in the Yukon, building a team of priests and mission workers from his many connections in the UK and southern Canada, including Anglican-trained women deaconesses and local Gwitchin Catechists. He re-built several churches and rectories and generally improved the infrastructure. He started a hostel, staffed with church workers, for white and native teens who lived along the highways who needed to be in the city to continue their education. He had oversight of the Chooutla Residential School and made frequent visits to talk with the principal and staff, and to check on the children so that on his next trips to northern Yukon, including Old Crow, he could update their parents on how they were doing. Bishop Tom made semi-annual trips south to attend House of Bishops meetings, and utilized those opportunities to do speaking tours of southern parishes. Sharing the work of the Church in the north in this way helped to raise funds and workers for the work of the Church in the Yukon.

In 1961, it was time to leave the north of Canada. Tom and Isabel moved to Whitegate, Cheshire where Bishop Greenwood became the Vicar of Whitegate, St. Mary's Parish, as well as Assistant Bishop of Chester, assisting the Bishop of Chester with confirmations. In 1965, they returned to Canada where Tom was Assistant Bishop of Cariboo, living in Kamloops, BC and leading the diocese while the Diocesan Bishop was on leave. From there, Tom and Isabel retired in 1969 to Ottawa, where he was an Honorary Assistant Bishop to the Bishop of Ottawa, Bishop Ernest Reed.

Having always kept his connection to his roots in the Church Army, he travelled to Toronto, Ontario on 1 February 1974 to be the keynote speaker at the annual meeting of the Canadian Church Army, now Threshold Ministries. He died from a heart attack upon reaching his destination. He was survived by his wife Isabel, his son David, three daughters, Sarah, Mary and Anne, and predeceased by a second son Michael. He is buried in Grey Mountain Cemetery, Whitehorse, Yukon.

Religious titles
Preceded by Walter Robert Adams	Bishop of Yukon; 1952–1961	Succeeded by Henry Hooper Marsh
