= Diocese of Kootenay =

Diocese of the Anglican Church in Canada

Location
- Ecclesiastical province: British Columbia and Yukon

Statistics
- Parishes: 26 (2022)
- Members: 2,363 (2022)

Information
- Denomination: Anglican Church of Canada
- Cathedral: St. Michael and All Angels Cathedral, Kelowna; St. Saviour's Pro-Cathedral, Nelson

Current leadership
- Bishop: Lynne McNaughton

Map
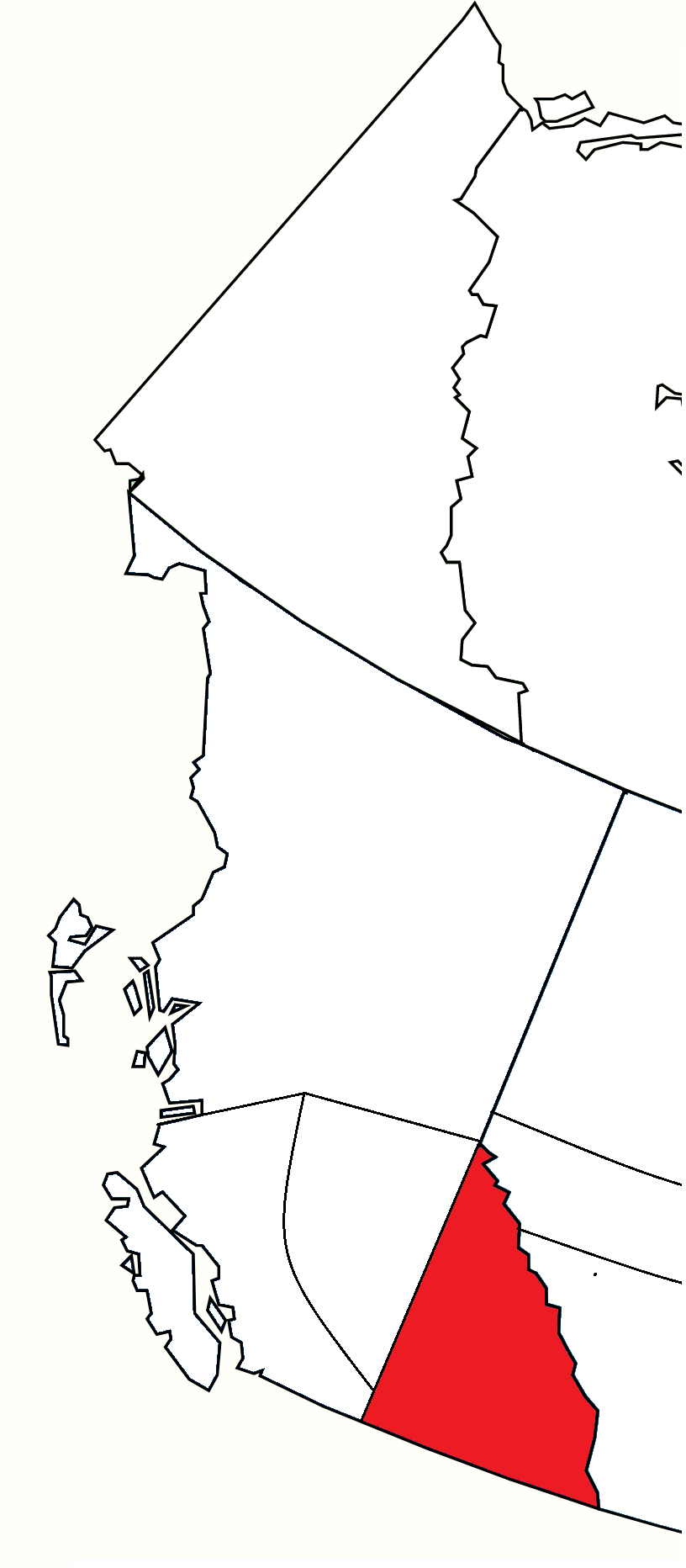
- Location of the diocese within the Ecclesiastical Province of British Columbia and Yukon.

Website
- www.kootenayanglican.ca

The Diocese of Kootenay is a diocese of the Ecclesiastical Province of British Columbia and the Yukon of the Anglican Church of Canada.

The diocese was created by a decision of the Synod of the Diocese of New Westminster in November 1899 to divide that diocese into two along the 120 degrees line of longitude. The new Diocese of Kootenay would comprise the area of the original diocese eastward of that line to the Alberta border. In 1900 the Synod of the new Diocese met in Nelson and selected St. Saviour's Church there as its cathedral. After being provisionally administered by New Westminster for several years, the Diocese of Kootenay got its first bishop, Alexander Doull, in 1914.

In 1987 the cathedral was re-established at its present location at St. Michael and All Angels' Church in the City of Kelowna, where the bishops had lived since 1955.

== Bishops of Kootenay ==
No.	Name	Dates	Notes
1	Alexander Doull	1914–1933	
2	Walter Adams	1933–1947	Metropolitan of British Columbia and Yukon, 1942-1951 and Bishop of Yukon, 1947–1952
3	Patrick Clark	1948–1954	
4	Philip Beattie	1955–1960	
5	Bill Coleman	1961–1965	
6	Ted Scott	1966–1971	Primate of All Canada, 1971–1986
7	Fraser Berry	1971–1989	
8	David Crawley	1990–2004	Metropolitan of British Columbia and Yukon, 1994-2004
9	John Privett	2005–2018	Metropolitan of British Columbia and Yukon, 2009-2018
10	Lynne McNaughton	2019–present	Metropolitan of British Columbia and Yukon, 2021-present

== Deans of Kootenay ==
Since 1987, the Dean of Kootenay has also been the incumbent at St Michael and All Angel's Cathedral, Kelowna.

- 1945–1948: Patrick Clark (Bishop of Kootenay, 1948)
- 1948–1956: Thomas L. Leadbeater
- 1957–1963: G.W. Lang
- 1973–1980: Alan Jackson
- 1987–2000: Jack Greenhalgh
- 2001–2009: Allan R. Reed
- 2009–2020: Nissa Basbaum
- 2021–present: David Tiessen
