= William Reeve (bishop) =

Canadian Anglican bishop

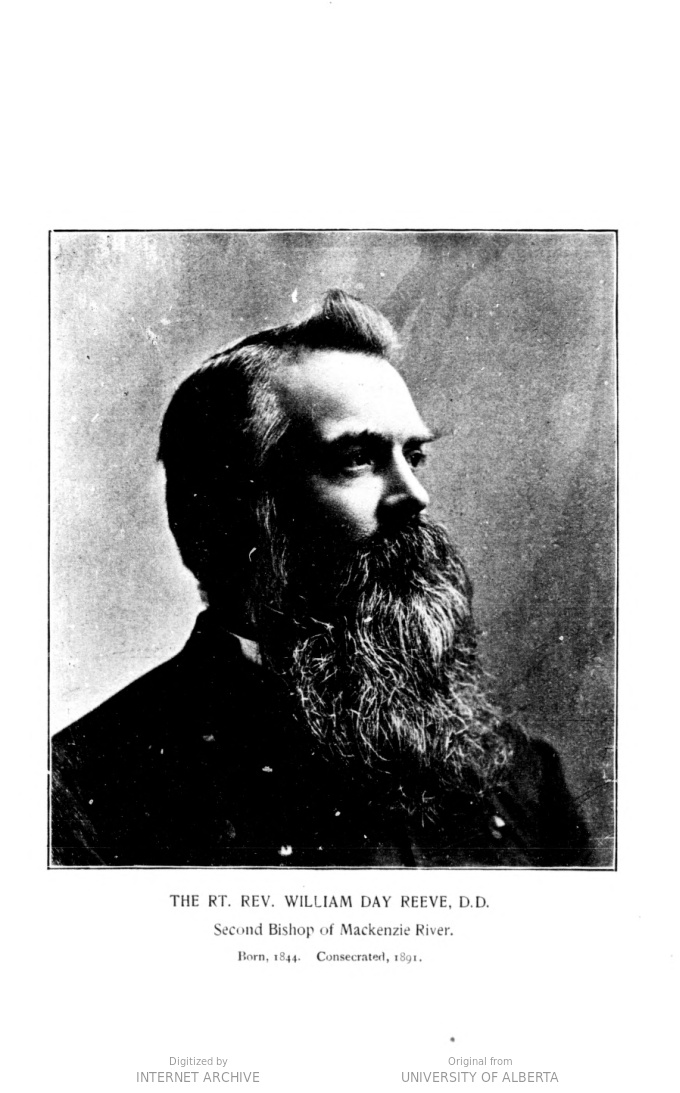
Photo circa 1896

William Day Reeve (1844-1925) was an Anglican priest.
He was born in Harmston on 3 January 1844 and educated at the CMS College, Islington going to Canada in 1868. He was ordained in 1868 and served at Fort Simpson from 1869 until he became Archdeacon of the Chipewyan in 1889. In 1891 he became Bishop of Mackenzie River, a post he held until 1907. Thereafter he was an Assistant Bishop in the Diocese of Toronto. He died on 12 May 1925.

Anglican Communion titles
Preceded by William Carpenter Bompas	Bishop of Mackenzie River; 1891–1907	Succeeded by Interregnum
