= John Snowden (bishop) =

Canadian Anglican bishop

John Samuel Philip Snowden was the sixth Bishop of Cariboo, serving from 1974 to 1991.

Snowden was educated at the Anglican Theological College, Vancouver and ordained in 1952. After curacies in Kaslo, Oak Bay and Nanaimo he was the incumbent at St Timothy, Vancouver. In 1974 he became Dean of Cariboo, a post he held until he became the bishop of the diocese. He established the ministry of Pastoral Elders in the Territory of the People in the former Diocese of Cariboo in 1978. In an attempt to recover an early practice of pastoral partnership, individuals in a First Nation community were identified as wise, spiritual elders and were commended to the Bishop for consideration to be commissioned as a "Pastoral Elder."

He also ordained the first woman priest in Canada on November 30, 1976, when Patricia Reid (along with 3 other women across Canada) was ordained in Prince George BC.

He and his wife Marjorie died in a car crash in 1996.
