= Ecclesiastical Province of British Columbia and Yukon =

Unit of the Anglican Church of Canada

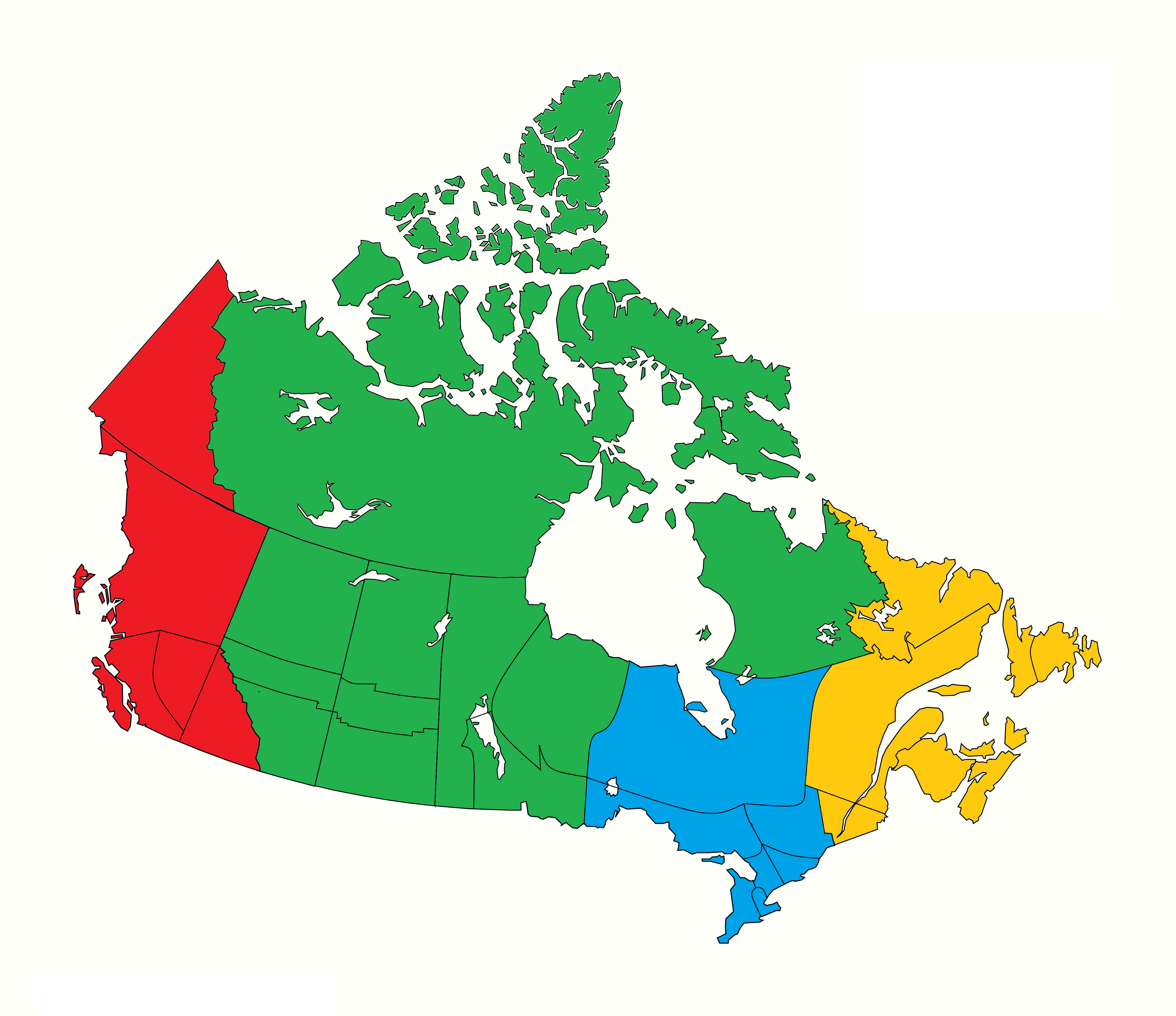
- The extent of the Province of British Columbia and Yukon shown in red
- Church: Anglican Church of Canada
- Metropolitan bishop: John Stephens
- Cathedral: Christ Church Cathedral
- Dioceses: 6 (5 dioceses; 1 territory with diocese-status)

Arms of the Ecclesiastical Province

The Ecclesiastical Province of British Columbia and Yukon is one of four ecclesiastical provinces in the Anglican Church of Canada. It was founded in 1914 as the Ecclesiastical Province of British Columbia, but changed its name in 1943 when the Diocese of Yukon was incorporated from the Ecclesiastical Province of Rupert's Land. The territory covered by the province encompasses the civil province of British Columbia and Yukon. There are five dioceses and one "recognized territory [with] the status of a diocese" in the province:

- British Columbia, also known as the diocese of Islands and Inlets (British Columbia)
- Caledonia (British Columbia)
- Kootenay (British Columbia)
- New Westminster (British Columbia)
- Yukon (Yukon)
- Territory of the People (British Columbia)

The former Diocese of Cariboo's operations were suspended as a result of insolvency arising from liability judgements in the cases of abuse at residential schools operated by the Diocese. The parishes within its territory were administered as the Anglican Parishes of the Central Interior by a suffragan bishop to the metropolitan starting 2004, and became a "recognized territory [with] the status of a diocese" (since 2016 known as the Territory of the People) on November 14, 2015.

Provinces of the Anglican Church of Canada are headed by a metropolitan, elected from among the province's diocesan bishops. This bishop then becomes archbishop of his or her diocese and metropolitan of the Province. The most recent metropolitan of the Province of British Columbia and Yukon was Lynne McNaughton of the Diocese of Kootenay prior to her resignation, with a successor scheduled to be elected early in 2025.

== Metropolitans of British Columbia and Yukon ==
| | Name | Diocese | Dates |
|---|---|---|---|
| 1st | Frederick Du Vernet | Archbishop of Caledonia | 1915-1924 |
| 2nd | Adam de Pencier | Archbishop of New Westminster | 1925–1940 |
| 3rd | Walter Adams | Archbishop of Kootenay and Yukon | 1942–1951 |
| 4th | Harold Sexton | Archbishop of British Columbia | 1952–1969 |
| 5th | Godfrey Gower | Archbishop of New Westminster | 1969–1971 |
| 6th | Ralph Dean | Archbishop of Cariboo | 1971–1973 |
| (Acting) | John Frame | Bishop of Yukon | 1973–1975 |
| 7th | David Somerville | Archbishop of New Westminster | 1975–1980 |
| 8th | Douglas Hambidge | Archbishop of New Westminster | 1981–1993 |
| (Acting) | John Hannen | Bishop of Caledonia | 1993–1994 |
| 9th | David Crawley | Archbishop of Kootenay | 1994–2004 |
| 10th | Terry Buckle | Archbishop of Yukon | 2005–2009 |
| 11th | John Privett | Archbishop of Kootenay | 2009–2018 |
| 12th | Melissa Skelton | Archbishop of New Westminster | 2018–2021 |
| 13th | Lynne McNaughton | Archbishop of Kootenay | 2021–2024 |
| 14th | John Stephens | Archbishop of New Westminster | 2025– |

== Suffragan bishops to the Metropolitan ==
- Gordon Light (2004–2008)
- Barbara Andrews (2009–2020)

== See also ==
- Ecclesiastical provinces of the Anglican Church of Canada
- List of dioceses of the Anglican Church of Canada
