= Melissa M. Skelton =

American Anglican bishop

The Most Reverend Melissa Skelton
- Archbishop of New Westminster
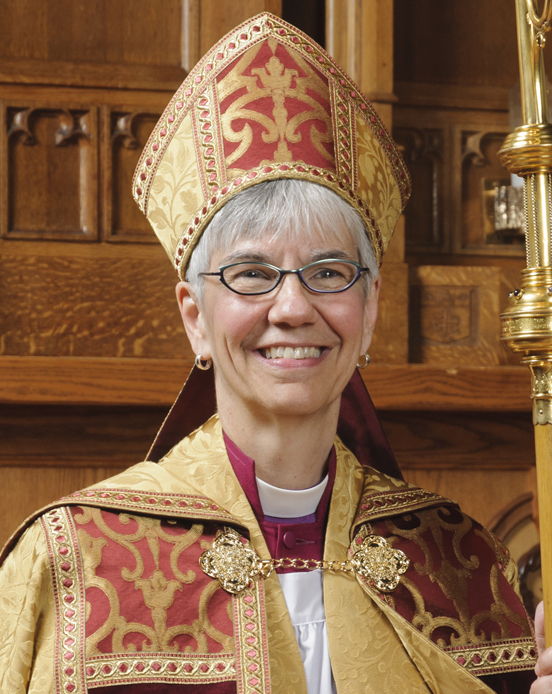
- Church: Anglican Church of Canada
- Province: Ecclesiastical Province of British Columbia and Yukon
- Diocese: New Westminster
- In office: 2014–2021
- Predecessor: Michael Ingham
- Successor: John Stephens
- Other posts: Metropolitan of British Columbia and Yukon (2018–2021); Bishop provisional of Olympia (2023–2024)

Orders
- Ordination: 1993
- Consecration: March 1, 2014 by Fred Hiltz

Personal details
- Born: March 14, 1951 (age 75) Columbus, Georgia, United States
- Spouse: Eric Stroo (m. 2015)

Melissa Maxine Skelton (born March 14, 1951) is an American Anglican bishop who served in the Anglican Church of Canada and the Episcopal Church. She was the 9th Bishop of the Anglican Diocese of New Westminster, a diocese in the Anglican Church of Canada, and was the 12th Metropolitan of the Ecclesiastical Province of British Columbia and Yukon. She was the first woman to be elected a metropolitan and archbishop in Anglican Church of Canada. Skelton was succeeded in her ministry as Bishop of New Westminster by John Stephens on February 28, 2021.

== Early life and education ==
Skelton was born in 1951, and raised in the US South, specifically, Alabama and Georgia. She came to faith in the Episcopal Church in her 20s. She studied at the University of Georgia from where she graduated with a Bachelor of Arts in English in 1973, and then at the University of South Carolina where she earned a Master of Arts in English in 1989, after which she served as a teaching assistant. Years later she earned a Master of Business Administration in Marketing and Finance from the University of Chicago. She enrolled at the Virginia Theological Seminary from where she earned a Master of Divinity in 1990. She was for a time brand manager at Procter & Gamble between 1992 and 1993.

== Career and ordained ministry ==
Skelton was ordained deacon in 1991 and priest in 1993. She served as associate priest at Trinity Church, New York City from 1993 to 1994; associate priest at St Andrew's Church in Trenton, New Jersey between 1994 and 1996; vice president for administration at the General Theological Seminary from 1993 to 1997; vice president of Brand and Systems Development at Tom's of Maine from 1997 until 2001; congregational development consultant for the Diocese of Maine between 2002 and 2004; and rector of Trinity Church in Castine, Maine from 2002 to 2005. She then was rector at St. Paul's Episcopal Church, Seattle, Washington from 2005 to 2014, and also canon for Congregational Development and Leadership – Diocese of Olympia, Seattle, Washington from 2008 to 2014. As canon, Skelton developed a congregational development program that adopts the gather–transform–send model, and this program was established as the core curriculum for the College for Congregational Development in the Episcopal Diocese of Olympia, the college that she founded during her nine-year incumbency at St. Paul's. In mid-2016 the Episcopal Diocese of Chicago added the College for Congregational Development to its program roster. As of May 2018, the School was active in four Episcopal church dioceses in the United States and one other diocese in Canada, the Diocese of Ottawa.

=== Episcopal ministry ===
On November 30, 2013, Skelton was elected the 9th Bishop of the Anglican Diocese of New Westminster: it was on the third ballot and by a substantial majority at an electoral synod held at Christ Church Cathedral, Vancouver, British Columbia, Canada. She was consecrated and installed in Vancouver on St. David's Day, March 1, 2014. The consecration event was a three-hour liturgy that took place in different locations, beginning at the Vancouver Convention Centre, followed by a procession through downtown Vancouver and then at the procession's destination, Christ Church Cathedral. Skelton was the first woman, the first American and the first person to have had a career outside of the church prior to ordination to be Bishop of the Diocese of New Westminster.

April 27, 2018, Skelton was named episcopal visitor to the North American province of the Society of Catholic Priests, which at the time was predominantly a group within the Episcopal Church in the United States.

On May 12, 2018, she was elected Metropolitan of the Ecclesiastical Province of British Columbia and Yukon, an office that comes with the title archbishop. She was elected by the members of the provincial house of bishops and the electoral college of the province on the first ballot. She is the first woman to become an archbishop in the Anglican Church of Canada. Skelton was installed as Metropolitan on Holy Cross Day, September 14, 2018, during a celebration of the Eucharist prior to the opening of Provincial Synod in Sorrento, British Columbia.

She announced by letter to the diocese on April 21, 2020, that she would be retiring as archbishop on February 28, 2021, as required by the Provincial Canons, under which bishops must retire by age 70.

Skelton returned to the Diocese of Olympia as an assisting bishop and in 2023 began serving as bishop provisional following the resignation of Gregory Rickel and until the installation of Philip N. LaBelle.

== Personal life ==
Skelton married Seattle-based family counsellor Eric Stroo on August 15, 2015, in Cannon Beach, Oregon. Stroo is also a non-stipendary deacon serving in the Episcopal Diocese of Olympia and currently on loan to the Diocese of New Westminster serving at St.Michael's Multicultural Anglican Church in Vancouver, British Columbia. She has three siblings: a brother in San Francisco and two sisters in Atlanta, Georgia.

Anglican Communion titles
Preceded by Michael Ingham	Bishop of New Westminster; 2013–2021	Succeeded by John Stephens
Preceded by John Privett	Metropolitan of the Province of British Columbia and Yukon; 2018–2021	Succeeded by Lynne McNaughton
