= John Stephens (bishop) =

Canadian Anglican bishop

The Most Reverend John Stephens
- Archbishop of New Westminster; Metropolitan of the Ecclesiastical Province of British Columbia and Yukon
- Church: Anglican Church of Canada
- Province: British Columbia and Yukon
- Diocese: New Westminster
- In office: 2021–present
- Predecessor: Melissa M. Skelton
- Previous posts: Archdeacon of Vancouver, Diocese of New Westminster; Rector, St. John's Shaughnessy

Orders
- Consecration: January 23, 2021 by Melissa M. Skelton

John Robert Stephens is a Canadian Anglican archbishop. Since 28 February 2021, he has been the tenth bishop of New Westminster in the Anglican Church of Canada (ACC), and in January 2025 he was elected the 14th metropolitan of the Ecclesiastical Province of British Columbia and Yukon.

== Biography ==
Stephens grew up in the Lower Mainland region of British Columbia and was raised in the Anglican Church. He earned an undergraduate degree in science from the University of British Columbia and graduated from the College of Emmanuel and St. Chad in Saskatoon. After ordination, he served a rural three-point parish in the Diocese of Huron.

In 1995, Stephens returned to British Columbia and became rector of St. John the Divine, Squamish. He was appointed rector of St. Philip's Church in Dunbar in 2001 and assumed an additional role as an archdeacon of the diocese. In 2016, Stephens became rector of St. John's Shaughnessy, which was rebuilding in the wake of the departure of most of the congregation during the Anglican realignment.

In October 2020, Stephens was elected coadjutor bishop of the Diocese of New Westminster to succeed Melissa M. Skelton. She consecrated him a bishop at Christ Church Cathedral on January 23, 2021, in a mostly unattended service due to COVID-19 restrictions. Bishop David Lehmann of the Diocese of Caledonia and Bishop Lynne McNaughton of the Diocese of Kootenay were co-consecrators. Stephens was installed as bishop on February 28, 2021. In January 2025, Stephens was elected to succeed McNaughton as metropolitan of the province, assuming the title of archbishop of New Westminster.

He is married to Ruth, and they have two adult children.

Anglican Communion titles
Preceded by Melissa M. Skelton	Bishop of New Westminster; Archbishop of New Westminster from 2025; 2021–present	Incumbent
Preceded by Lynne McNaughton	Metropolitan of British Columbia and Yukon; 2025–present	Incumbent
