= William Geddes (bishop) =

Canadian Anglican bishop

Orders
- Consecration: 3 Feb 1929 by Samuel Matheson

William Archibald Geddes was an Anglican priest in the mid 20th century.

He was born in the Magdalen Islands on 18 February 1894 and educated at Dalhousie University. He served in the Great War as a gunner in the 8th Canadian Siege Battery. He was ordained in 1920 as a missionary to the Eskimo at Herschel Island. He was appointed Archdeacon of Yukon in 1927 and the next year became Bishop of Mackenzie River, a post he held for 5 years. In 1934 he was translated to Yukon. He died in post on 16 April 1947.

Anglican Communion titles
Preceded by James Richard Lucas	Bishop of Mackenzie River; 1928–1933	Succeeded by Diocese absorbed into Anglican Diocese of the Arctic
Preceded by Arthur Henry Sovereign	Bishop of Yukon; 1934–1947	Succeeded by Walter Robert Adams
