= Chris Harper (bishop) =

Canadian Anglican bishop

The Most Reverend Chris Harper
- National Indigenous Anglican Archbishop
- Church: Anglican Church of Canada
- In office: 2023–present
- Predecessor: Mark MacDonald
- Other post: Bishop of Saskatoon (2018–2023)

Orders
- Ordination: February 6, 2003 (diaconate); October 16, 2005 (priesthood) by Anthony Burton (diaconate); Charles Arthurson (priesthood)
- Consecration: November 17, 2018 by Greg Kerr-Wilson

Personal details
- Born: Paradise Hill, Saskatchewan, Canada
- Denomination: Anglicanism
- Spouse: Tracy
- Children: 2
- Education: Wycliffe College, Toronto (M.Div.)

Christopher Anthony Harper is a Canadian Anglican bishop. A Cree member of the Treaty 6 First Nations people, he has been the national indigenous Anglican archbishop in the Anglican Church of Canada since 2023. Prior to this he was the bishop of Saskatoon from 2018 to 2023. He is the first Treaty 6 priest to be ordained a bishop.

== Biography ==
Harper was born in Paradise Hill, Saskatchewan, and spent much of his younger life on Onion Lake Cree Nation. Harper was an emergency medical technician before his call to ordination. Prior to ordained ministry, he was also a lay minister in Onion Lake. He studied theology at the Diocese of Saskatchewan's James Settee College and then moved to Toronto to study for his master of divinity at Wycliffe College. Ordained in 2005, he first served as rector of Birch Hills & Kinistino, a multi-point parish in the Diocese of Saskatchewan before being called to a church in Thunder Bay. In 2016, he was named indigenous native priest for the Diocese of Toronto, responsible for helping churches in the diocese engage in ministry to First Nations people in its borders.

In 2018, Harper was elected as bishop of Saskatoon. He was consecrated to the episcopacy on November 17, 2018, at the Cathedral of St. John the Evangelist. In December 2022, it was announced that Harper would succeed Mark MacDonald as national indigenous Anglican archbishop and presiding elder of the church's Sacred Circle.

Harper was a candidate to serve as Primate of the Anglican Church of Canada in the June 2025 election by the General Synod; Shane Parker was elected.

Religious titles
Preceded by David Irving	Bishop of Saskatoon; 2018–2023	Succeeded by Chad McCharles
Preceded by Mark MacDonald	National Indigenous Anglican Archbishop; 2023–present	Incumbent
