= Chad McCharles =

Canadian Anglican bishop

The Right Reverend Chad McCharles OSBCn
- Bishop of Saskatoon
- Church: Anglican Church of Canada
- Province: Northern Lights
- Diocese: Saskatoon
- Elected: 8 March 2025
- In office: 2025–present
- Predecessor: Chris Harper

Orders
- Ordination: 2008 by Jim Njegovan
- Consecration: 14 June 2025 by Greg Kerr-Wilson

Personal details
- Born: Shoal Lake, Manitoba, Canada
- Denomination: Anglicanism
- Spouse: Dawn
- Children: 2
- Education: St. John's College, Manitoba; Brandon University

Chad McCharles is a Canadian Anglican bishop. Since 2025, he has been the 10th bishop of the Anglican Diocese of Saskatoon in the Anglican Church of Canada. Prior to his episcopacy, McCharles was a priest in Manitoba.

== Biography ==
McCharles was born and raised on a cattle and grain farm in Shoal Lake, Manitoba. He began his career as a bakery owner and operator, and married his wife, Dawn, with whom he had two children. After some years he experienced a call to ordained ministry and received a diploma from St. John's College. McCharles was ordained by Bishop of Brandon Jim Njegovan in 2008 and began his ministry as rector of a five-point parish centered on Neepawa, Manitoba.

From 2013 to 2016, McCharles was a rector in Brandon, and from 2017 to 2020 he was a rector in Mahone Bay, Nova Scotia. He returned to Neepawa in 2020 and took a role as pastor of Neepawa United-Anglican Shared Ministry, which combined the Neepawa United Church and St. James' Anglican Church, one of the churches in the five-point parish. In 2023, he was a finalist in the election for the bishop of Brandon; Rachael Parker was elected.

In addition to leading the Neepawa church, McCharles took vows as a member of the Canons of St. Benedict in 2019 and was prior of the Benedictine Community of St. Joseph the Worker in Neepawa. McCharles was also a school bus driver, having been recruited to help address a shortage of drivers when he returned to the Neepawa area in 2020. McCharles viewed his twice-a-day route as an extension of his ordained ministry and a way to connect with families in the rural community.

McCharles was elected bishop of Saskatoon on the first ballot in March 2025 and consecrated by Archbishop Greg Kerr-Wilson at the Cathedral of St. John the Evangelist in June 2025.

Anglican Communion titles
Preceded by Chris Harper	Bishop of Saskatoon; Since 2025	Incumbent
