= List of Anglican cathedrals in Canada =

There are a number of Anglican cathedrals in Canada. The Anglican Church of Canada is an ecclesiastical province of the Anglican Communion. Cathedrals are typically, though not always, the central church for the dioceses of the Anglican Church of Canada.

== List ==
Congregation	Location	Founded (Note: Year parish was established)	Diocese	Year elevated to cathedral	Built (Note: Year the cathedral's present building was built)	Image	Ref.
All Saints' Anglican Cathedral	Edmonton	1875	Edmonton	1956	1955–1956		
Cathedral Church of All Saints'	Halifax	1787	Nova Scotia and Prince Edward Island	1910	1907–1910		
Cathedral Church of St. James	Toronto	1797	Toronto	1839	1850–1853		
Cathedral Church of St. John the Evangelist	Corner Brook	1977	Western Newfoundland	2005	1987 (Note: 1987 was the date was when the parish purchased the Mennonite Meeting Hall to use as its permanent church building, not when the building was erected.)		
Cathedral Church of St. Michael and All Angels	Kelowna	1894	Kootenay	1987	1913		
Cathedral Church of the Holy Trinity	Quebec City	1783	Quebec	1804	1800–1804		
Cathedral Church of the Redeemer	Calgary	1884	Calgary	1949	1905		
Cathedral of St. John	Winnipeg	1822	Rupert's Land	1849	1926		
Cathedral of St. John the Baptist	St. John's	1699	Eastern Newfoundland and Labrador	1839	1847–1850 (Note: Transept and choir of the cathedral was completed in 1880 to 1885. The Great Fire of 1892 caused significant damage to the cathedral, and the building was not restored until 1905.)		
Cathedral of St. John	Saskatoon	1902	Saskatoon	1932	1912–1917		
Cathedral of St. Simon and St. Jude	Iqaluit	1972	The Arctic		2012		
Christ Church Cathedral	Fredericton	1845	Fredericton	1853	1845–1853 (Note: Lightning struck the cathedral in 1911, destroying the spire, and damaging other parts of the building. Restorations took place during that year, and the building was rededicated in 1912.)		
Christ Church Cathedral	Ottawa	1832	Ottawa	1897	1872–1873		
Christ Church Cathedral	Montreal	1789	Montreal	1850	1857–1860		
Christ Church Cathedral	Vancouver	1888	New Westminster	1929	1889–1895		
Christ Church Cathedral	Victoria	1856	British Columbia	1859	1923–1929		
Christ Church Cathedral	Whitehorse		Yukon				
Christ's Church Cathedral	Hamilton	1835	Niagara	1876	1852–1873		
Holy Trinity Cathedral (Note: Holy Trinity Cathedral is formally a parish church, not a cathedral; as it does not hold the cathedra of the diocese. Holy Trinity Cathedral served as the pro-cathedral of the Diocese of New Westminster from 1892 to 1929. In 1929, the seat of the diocese was moved to Christ Church Cathedral in Vancouver, although Holy Trinity retained the right to use Cathedral in its name.)	New Westminster	1860	New Westminster	1892	1899–1902		
St. Alban's Cathedral	Kenora	1882 (Note: Parish was originally established as St. Alban's on the Hills)	Rupert's Land	1902	1917		
St. Alban's Cathedral	Prince Albert		Saskatchewan				
St. Andrew's Cathedral	Prince Rupert	1929	Caledonia				
St. George's Cathedral	Kingston	1792	Ontario	1862	1825–1828		
St. James' Cathedral	Peace River		Athabasca	1949	1936		
St. Luke's Cathedral	Sault Ste. Marie		Algoma	1870	1873		
St. Martin's Cathedral	Gander		Central Newfoundland				
St. Matthew's Cathedral	Brandon	1883	Brandon	1952	1912–1913		
St. Matthew's Cathedral	Timmins		Moosonee				
St. Paul's Cathedral	Kamloops	1884 (Note: The parish originated from the Kamloops Missionary District, established in 1884. In 1917, St. Paul's formally became a single congregation urban parish.)	Cariboo	1888 (Note: The building was originally built in 1888. In 1924, the building was moved to its present location, and expanded.)	1935		
St. Paul's Cathedral	London		Huron		1844–1846		
St. Paul's Cathedral	Regina	1883	Qu'Appelle	1973	1894–1895		
St. Peter's Cathedral	Charlottetown	1869	Nova Scotia and Prince Edward Island	1879	1869		

== See also ==
- List of Anglican churches
- List of Anglican churches in Toronto
- List of cathedrals in Canada
