= William Hallam =

William Hallam may refer to:

- William Hallam (bishop)
- William Hallam (theatre manager)
- William Hallam (trade unionist)
