= Roland Wood =

Canadian Anglican bishop (1933–2002)

Roland Arthur Wood (1 January 1933 – 17 September 2002) was an Anglican bishop. He was educated at Bishop's University, Lennoxville, and ordained in 1958. He began his career as Assistant Curate at St Matthew's, Winnipeg after which he was Rector Christ Church, Selkirk. From 1964 to 1967 he was an Assistant Priest at St John's Cathedral, Saskatoon and then Rector of Holy Trinity Church, Yorkton until 1971. Next he was Rector of the Cathedral of St. John the Evangelist (Saskatoon) for a decade and then Bishop of Saskatoon from 1981 until 1993. Finally he was Rector of St James' Cathedral and Dean of Athabasca until 1998.

Religious titles
Preceded by Douglas Ford	Bishop of Saskatoon; 1981–1993	Succeeded by Tom Morgan
