= Vicars Short =

Hedley Vicars Roycraft Short was an Anglican bishop in the last third of the 20th century. He was educated at the University of Toronto and ordained in 1944. He held curacies at St Michael's Toronto and then Coventry Cathedral. Returning to Canada he was a lecturer at Trinity College, Toronto, and for a while its Acting Dean. After incumbencies at Cochrane and St. Catharines he became Rector of Prince Albert and Dean of Saskatchewan in 1963. From 1966 he was also Archdeacon of the area. In 1970 he became Bishop of Saskatchewan, serving for 11 years.

Religious titles
Preceded by William Henry Howes Crump	Bishop of Saskatchewan; 1970–1985	Succeeded by Thomas Oliver Morgan
