= Jervois Newnham =

Canadian Anglican bishop

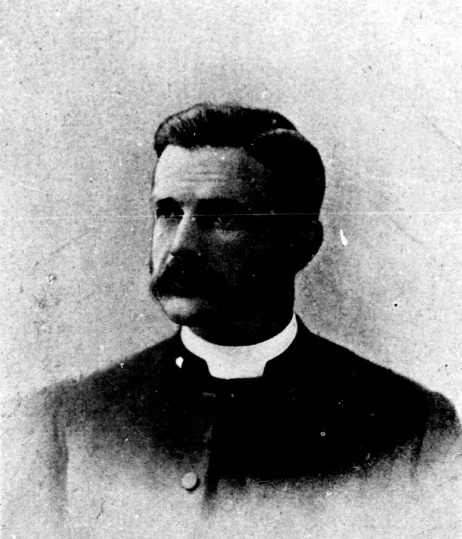

Jervois Arthur Newnham was an Anglican bishop in Canada from 1893 to 1921.

Born into an ecclesiastical family in 1852, he was educated at McGill University and began his ordained ministry as a curate at Christ Church Cathedral, Montreal after which he was the incumbent of Onslow. Later he was the rector of St Matthias' Montreal. He became the Bishop of Moosonee in 1891 and was translated to Saskatchewan in 1904. He returned to England in 1921, becoming the rector of Clifton, Bedfordshire

Newnham died on 12 January 1941.

Religious titles
Preceded by John Horden	Bishop of Moosonee; 1893–1904	Succeeded by George Holmes
Preceded by William Cyprian Pinkham	Bishop of Saskatchewan; 1904–1921	Succeeded by George Lloyd
