= Wilfred Fuller (bishop) =

Anglican bishop (1900–1950)

Wilfred Eastland Fuller (1900–1950) was an Anglican bishop.

He was educated at Wycliffe College and began his ordained ministry as a curate at St Luke, St John. He held incumbencies at Addington, Norton and Halifax. He was Rector of the Cathedral of St. John the Evangelist (Saskatoon) and Dean of Saskatoon from 1943 to 1949, when he became the Diocese's second bishop.

There is a memorial stained glass window to him at the cathedral

Religious titles
Preceded by William Thomas Thompson Hallam	Bishop of Saskatoon; 1949–1950	Succeeded by Stanley Charles Steer
