= Richard Reed (bishop) =

U.S.-born Canadian Anglican bishop (born 1967)

The Right Reverend Richard Reed
- Bishop of Saskatchewan
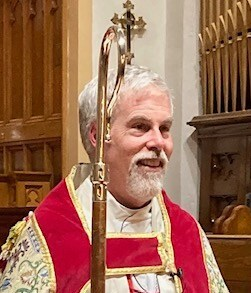
- Church: Anglican Church of Canada
- Diocese: Saskatchewan
- In office: 2024–present
- Predecessor: Michael Hawkins

Orders
- Ordination: 2005 (diaconate); 2006 (priesthood)
- Consecration: September 6, 2024 by Greg Kerr-Wilson

Personal details
- Born: 1967 (age 58–59) Nashville, Tennessee, US

Richard Reed (born 1967) is an American-born Canadian Anglican bishop. He was elected and consecrated in 2024 as bishop of the Diocese of Saskatchewan in the Anglican Church of Canada.

== Biography ==
Reed was born in 1967 in Nashville, Tennessee, where he was raised and baptized in the Episcopal Church. In his early 20s, he renewed his Christian practice, returned to church and spent three years in Kolkata as a missionary through Youth With A Mission. He is married to Julie-Anne; as of 2024, they had four grown children and one grandchild.

Reed moved to Canada in 1998 to attend Regent College, where he earned a master's degree in Christian studies. He was ordained as a deacon in the Anglican Church in 2005 and as a priest in 2006. As a priest, he held incumbencies in the Diocese of Brandon and the Diocese of Algoma before moving to Saskatchewan, where he was priest in charge of a three-church parish based in Prince Albert.

In 2024, Reed was elected the 13th bishop of Saskatchewan on the fifth ballot. He was consecrated and installed as bishop on September 6, 2024, by Archbishop Greg Kerr-Wilson at the St. Alban's Cathedral in Prince Albert.

Anglican Communion titles
Preceded by Michael Hawkins	Bishop of Saskatchewan; 2024–present	Incumbent
