= Association of Presbyterian Colleges and Universities =

University association

The Association of Presbyterian Colleges and Universities is a private, not-for-profit organization of colleges and universities associated with the Presbyterian Church (USA), a mainline Protestant Christian denomination.

== Member schools ==
- Agnes Scott College (Decatur, Georgia)
- Alma College (Alma, Michigan)
- Arcadia University (Glenside, Pennsylvania)
- Austin College (Sherman, Texas)
- Barber–Scotia College (Concord, North Carolina)
- Belhaven University (Jackson, Mississippi)
- Blackburn College (Carlinville, Illinois)
- Buena Vista University (Storm Lake, Iowa)
- Carroll University (Waukesha, Wisconsin)
- Centre College (Danville, Kentucky)
- Coe College (Cedar Rapids, Iowa)
- The College of Idaho (Caldwell, Idaho)
- College of the Ozarks (Point Lookout, Missouri)
- The College of Wooster (Wooster, Ohio)
- Cook College and Theological School (Tempe, Arizona)
- Davidson College (Davidson, North Carolina)
- Davis and Elkins College (Elkins, West Virginia)
- Eckerd College (Saint Petersburg, Florida)
- Hampden–Sydney College (Hampden Sydney, Virginia)
- Hannam University (Daejeon, South Korea)
- Hanover College (Hanover, Indiana)
- Hastings College (Hastings, Nebraska)
- Illinois College (Jacksonville, Illinois; with the United Church of Christ)
- Interamerican University of Puerto Rico (San Germán, Puerto Rico)
- Johnson C. Smith University (Charlotte, North Carolina)
- King University (Bristol, Tennessee)
- Knoxville College (Knoxville, Tennessee)
- Lake Forest College (Lake Forest, Illinois)
- Lees–McRae College (Banner Elk, North Carolina)
- Lindenwood University (Saint Charles, Missouri)
- Lyon College (Batesville, Arkansas)
- Macalester College (Saint Paul, Minnesota)
- Mary Baldwin University (Staunton, Virginia)
- Maryville College (Maryville, Tennessee)
- Millikin University (Decatur, Illinois)
- Missouri Valley University (Marshall, Missouri)
- Monmouth College (Monmouth, Illinois)
- Muskingum College (New Concord, Ohio)
- Presbyterian College (Clinton, South Carolina)
- Rhodes College (Memphis, Tennessee)
- Rocky Mountain College (Billings, Montana)
- Schreiner University (Kerrville, Texas)
- Sheldon Jackson College (Sitka, Alaska)
- Sterling College (Sterling, Kansas)
- Stillman College (Tuscaloosa, Alabama)
- Trinity University (San Antonio, Texas)
- Tusculum University (Greeneville, Tennessee)
- Universidad Interamericana de Puerto Rico (Numerous campuses in Puerto Rico)
- University of Dubuque (Dubuque, Iowa)
- University of Jamestown (Jamestown, North Dakota)
- University of Pikeville (Pikeville, Kentucky)
- University of the Ozarks (Clarksville, Arkansas)
- University of Tulsa (Tulsa, Oklahoma)
- Warren Wilson College (Asheville, North Carolina)
- Waynesburg University (Waynesburg, Pennsylvania)
- Westminster College (Fulton, Missouri)
- Westminster College (New Wilmington, Pennsylvania)
- Westminster University (Salt Lake City, Utah)
- Whitworth University (Spokane, Washington)
- William Peace University (Raleigh, North Carolina)
- Wilson College (Chambersburg, Pennsylvania)
