= Michael Hawkins =

Michael Hawkins may refer to:

- Michael Hawkins Jr., American football player
- Michael Hawkins (basketball) (born 1972), American former professional basketball player
- Michael Hawkins (American actor) (1938–2022), American actor
- Michael Hawkins (British actor) (1928–2014), British actor
- Michael Hawkins (bishop), Bishop of Saskatchewan
- Michael Daly Hawkins (born 1954), US Court of Appeals judge
- Michael Hawkins (footballer) (born 1951), Australian rules footballer
- Mike Hawkins (cornerback) (born 1983), American football cornerback
- Mike Hawkins (linebacker) (born 1955), former American football linebacker
- Mike Hawkins (musician) (born 1991), Danish DJ and record producer
