= Douglas Ford (bishop) =

Douglas Albert Ford (16 July 1917 – 23 January 2007) was an Anglican bishop.

He was born in Vancouver and educated at the University of British Columbia. He was ordained in 1942 and was initially held curacies at 1942; Curate, St Mary's, Kerrisdale and after that at St George's, Vancouver. He was Vicar of Strathmore and then held further incumbencies at Okotoks, Vermilion, Calgary and Lethbridge before being appointed rector of the Saskatoon and Dean of Saskatoon in 1966. Four years later he became the Diocese's fourth bishop.

He resigned his See in 1981.

Upon his retirement in 1981, he returned to parish ministry at All Saints in Cochrane, Alberta where he served until 1985, while also acting as Assistant Bishop of Calgary. He died January 23, 2007, and is inurned in the Columbarium at St. John's Cathedral, Saskatoon.

The Bishop Ford Memorial Garden and Columbarium is located on the grounds of All Saints Anglican Church, Cochrane.

Religious titles
Preceded by Stanley Charles Steer	Bishop of Saskatoon; 1970–1981	Succeeded by Roland Arthur Wood
