= Diocese of Saskatoon =

There are several Christian Churches with a Diocese or Eparchy of Saskatoon,
all with see in Saskatoon, Saskatchewan, Canada :

- Anglican Diocese of Saskatoon of the Anglican Church of Canada
- Roman Catholic Diocese of Saskatoon of the Roman Catholic Church
- Ukrainian Catholic Eparchy of Saskatoon of the Ukrainian Greek Catholic Church
