= Walter Burd =

Anglican bishop

- Bishop of Saskatchewan
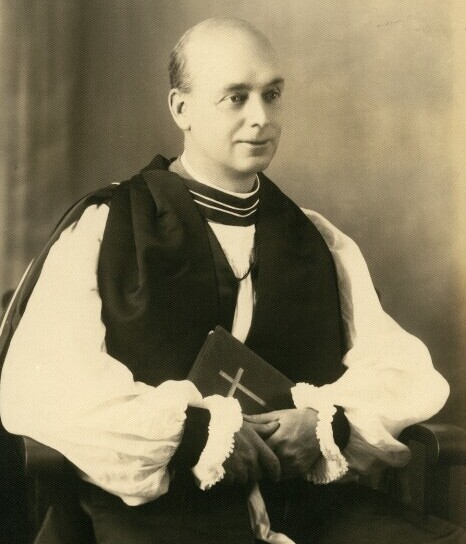

Orders
- Consecration: 12 March 1933 by Isaac Stringer

Walter Burd, DCM, was an Anglican bishop in the second quarter of the 20th century.
He was born on 23 February 1888 and educated at Wycliffe College. He served with distinction in the First World War after which he became the General Secretary of the Brotherhood of St. Andrew, Canada. Following ordination he was Rector of Tisdale and then Rural Dean of Melfort. Later he was a canon residentiary at St Alban's Cathedral, Prince Albert and then Archdeacon of the area until his elevation to the episcopate as the Bishop of Saskatchewan in 1933. He resigned in Spring 1939 but died a few months later on 2 August.

Religious titles
Preceded by William Thomas Thompson Hallam	Bishop of Saskatchewan; 1933–1939	Succeeded by Henry David Martin
