= Isaac Barr =

Isaac Montgomery Barr - 1902

Isaac Montgomery Barr (March 2, 1847 – January 18, 1937) was an Anglican clergyman and promoter of British colonial settlement schemes, most notably the Barr Colony which became Lloydminster and District in Alberta and Saskatchewan, Canada.

== Early life and education ==
Isaac M. Barr was born in Hornby, Canada West (now part of Halton Hills in Ontario, Canada). His father, William Barr, born in 1816 in Ireland, was a Presbyterian Minister. Isaac Barr's mother Catharine (Baird) Barr, also born in Ireland, died when Isaac was 10 years old. Isaac Barr's early education was in a small rural school where the teacher was his father, supplementing his modest ministerial stipend. William Barr brought much of his ministerial approach to education and young Isaac emulated his father by playing the role of preacher in childhood games. From 1868 – 1870 Barr attended Huron College, in London, Ontario, with the intention of becoming an Anglican cleric. In 1870, he moved his studies to the University of Toronto. Following graduation he began his ministerial career as a curate in Exeter and Woodstock, Ontario.

== Personal life ==
August 10, 1870 – Isaac Barr married Eliza Weaver in London, Ontario. Their first child, Dora Kathleen Barr was born in 1874. A son, Harry Baird Barr, was born in 1877 and a daughter, Gertrude, was born 1883. Allegedly divorced from Eliza, Barr married Emma Williams on June 25, 1900, in New Whatcom, Washington. His son Harry died of disease while serving with Canadian contingents participating in the Second Boer War in South Africa. In 1905, in Lincoln, Nebraska, Barr married Christina Helberg. They had two sons: Harry Baird Montgomery Barr and William Hall Barr.

== Ministerial career ==
In 1875, Isaac Barr was appointed by the Bishop of Saskatchewan to serve the Prince Albert Settlement in Saskatchewan in what was then the North-West Territories. He left this charge, without permission, after receiving news that his wife and daughter in Ontario were ill. Barr was next appointed by the Bishop of Huron to charges in Point Edward and then the Kanyenga Mission, near Brantford. Controversies with church officials led to him moving to the United States in 1883 as Rector of Grace Church in Lapeer, Michigan. This was followed by charges in East Saginaw and Midland, Michigan, and Harriman, Tennessee before, in 1899, moving to New Whatcom, Washington. In December 1901, Barr resigned his ministerial appointment with a view to join and support the colonizing efforts of Cecil Rhodes in South Africa. On February 4, 1902, the Archbishop of Canterbury licensed Barr to preach in England. Barr secured a post as Curate-in-Charge at St. Saviour's Church in London.

== Career as a colonizer ==
Isaac Barr became an admirer of Cecil Rhodes and his colonial initiatives in southern Africa. He resigned his ministry in Washington state with a view to travelling to South Africa to assist Rhodes. When Barr reached London, England in January 1902, he learned of Rhodes's declining health and, two months later, Rhodes died. Barr had also observed the economic difficulties in England at the time, compounded by thousands of soldiers returning from the War in South Africa with few economic prospects. Barr began an intensive campaign of letter writing and public speaking, urging the people of England to emigrate to Western Canada. As his biographer, Helen Evans Reid, describes it, Barr stressed two opportunities: to "exchange ... the poverty of Britain for an estate in Canada"; and the "chance to build the Empire by planting a colony of pure British culture in the empty territory".

At the same time, another Anglican cleric with Canadian experience, George Exton Lloyd, was writing letters to the editor also encouraging British settlement in Western Canada. Both Barr and Lloyd received large numbers of responses to their letters and, on Barr's initiative, the two men met at Lloyd's home in London. As the response continued, Barr developed an increasingly detailed plan for a group settlement. In September 1902, he sailed for Canada to meet with Canadian government officials in Ottawa, and railway executives in Montreal. He also met with officials of the Elder Dempster shipping lines to arrange ocean transportation. Barr made verbal arrangements with all these individuals for assistance and support. Both the Government of Canada and the shipping lines had incentive programs to promote the much desired settlement. However, many of the commitments Barr received were not carried to complete fruition.

Upon his return to England, Barr published his arrangements in Canada. Barr's plans included the formation of several "syndicates" or co-operatives through which the colonists could purchase transportation equipment, farm machinery and livestock. There was even to be an organization devoted to medical care and hospital coverage after arrival. The scale and complexity of the plans increased as the number of prospective settlers grew. However, he was overwhelmed by the questions, demands, and complaints of over 3,000 eager prospective colonials. Barr hired George Flamank as secretary, and Christina Helberg as typist to deal with the vast quantity of correspondence. Rev. Lloyd, too, became increasing involved, eventually arranging with the Colonial and Continental Church Society to receive a stipend to act as Chaplain to the group and thus he and his wife and their five children became "Barr Colonists".

The project expanded into one of the largest group settlement movements in Canadian history, attracting attention from the Canadian, British, and even the United States press. The main party, including Barr and Lloyd, sailed on the SS Lake Manitoba from Liverpool on March 31.1903. Many other colonists came on other ships and this flow continued over a period of several years,as a result of Barr’s promotion of a British settler colony in Western Canada. Unfortunately for Barr, many of the colonists were urban and middle class, with little tolerance for the vicissitudes of ocean and rail travel, let alone the life of pioneering farmers.

By the time the ship docked in Saint John, New Brunswick complaints had already surfaced about Barr's inability to meet the colonials’ expectations. Rev. Lloyd had emerged as a steadying force and contrast to Barr. The growing tension between the two was fueled by Barr's lifestyle; drinking alcoholic beverages, and a relationship with the young, female typist, both of which offended the prim moral standards of Rev. Lloyd.

Nevertheless, the settlement was taking on epic proportions. There were five trainloads of settlers journeying over 4,000 kilometers across Canada, to Saskatoon, then a small village at the end of rail. Then the naive settlers set about purchasing oxen, horses, and wagons to transport their huge quantities of baggage, with everything from fine china to pianos, and travel the remaining 300 kilometers to the townships where homestead lands awaited, reserved for them as a result of Barr's visit to Ottawa. Colonists continued to blame Barr for the high prices of goods, the harsh weather conditions, and the lack of suitable travel facilities. A meeting of some of the colonists at the midway point of Fort Battleford voted to reject Barr as leader and replace him with Rev. Lloyd.

Contrary to some local Lloydminster lore, Isaac Barr did reach the future site of Lloydminster and, on the morning of May 10, 1903, raised a red ensign he had brought with him, to mark the culmination of his plan. However, facing rejection and criticism, threatened with legal action, or worse, Barr retreated from the adventure. His rejection was even more poignant when, despite some growing pains, the settlement quickly became a success and one of the prime agricultural areas in western Canada and, later, an oil producing center as well. It had, indeed, been a promised land.

== Later years ==
After his withdrawal from the Barr Colony expedition, Barr returned to Markham, Ontario where he had left Christina Helberg with his relatives. He married Christina in Lincoln, Nebraska in 1905, worked briefly as an insurance salesman, before moving to Ferndale, Washington where he attempted farming. In 1910 he became interested in a settlement scheme in Victoria, Australia. He sold his property and moved himself, Christina, and two young sons to Australia. The Closer Settlement was 210 kilometers from Melbourne, near Cohuna. Conditions in the new settlement were challenging, farming success was modest, but Isaac and Christina raised their young family, with descendants remaining in the area. Barr died January 18, 1937, in Cohuna, Victoria, Australia, at age 89.
