= Adam Halkett =

Retired Indigenous Canadian Anglican bishop (born 1954)

The Right Reverend Adam Halkett
- Bishop of Missinipi
- Church: Anglican Church of Canada
- Diocese: Saskatchewan
- In office: 12 October 2012–25 September 2025
- Predecessor: Charles Arthurson

Orders
- Ordination: 1999 (diaconate); 2000 (priesthood)
- Consecration: 12 October 2012

Personal details
- Born: December 25, 1954 (age 71) Swan River, Saskatchewan

Adam Halkett (born 1954) is a Cree Anglican bishop in Canada. From 2012 to 2025 he served as the suffragan bishop of Missinippi in the Anglican Diocese of Saskatchewan, with pastoral oversight of Indigenous Anglican communities across northern Saskatchewan.

== Early life and education ==
Halkett was born on a trapline in Swan River, Saskatchewan, and raised in the Red Lake district and on the Montreal Lake Cree Nation reserve. His parents, Alice and Isaiah Halkett, were Anglican Christians who ensured their children were baptized and raised in the church.

In his youth Halkett lived a traditional Cree life of hunting and fishing, and briefly attended Prince Albert Indian Residential School at age sixteen to improve his English. He later recalled that he did not suffer abuse there, though he witnessed the experiences of others.

Halkett studied for ministry at James Settee College for Ministry in Prince Albert, a diocesan training program for Indigenous clergy and lay leaders.

== Ministry before episcopate ==
After a period of personal struggle with addiction, Halkett recommitted himself to Christianity in 1982. He began serving as a lay reader in his community, a ministry he continued for seventeen years.

He was ordained deacon in 1999 and priest in 2000. Following ordination, he served as priest-in-charge of St. Joseph's Anglican Church in Montreal Lake, his home parish. In 2005 he was appointed Archdeacon of Saskatchewan. In this capacity he combined parish ministry with oversight responsibilities and mentorship of other Indigenous clergy.

== Bishop of Missinipi ==
On 28 July 2012 Halkett was elected as the first Diocesan Indigenous Bishop of Saskatchewan at a diocesan assembly held in Prince Albert. He was consecrated later that year as Bishop of Missinippi, a suffragan bishopric created to serve Cree and other Indigenous communities in the northern two-thirds of the province.

The election was part of a diocesan vision known as Mamawi isi miywâcimowin ("Together in the Gospel"), which sought to give greater authority to Indigenous leadership in the church. Halkett succeeded Charles Arthurson, who had served as an Indigenous suffragan bishop from 1989 to 2008.

As Bishop of Missinippi, Halkett had responsibility for more than sixty predominantly Cree parishes. He regularly traveled to remote communities by road, ministering in both Cree and English. His work included pastoral care in contexts of poverty, youth suicide, and community crises, as well as support for training Indigenous clergy and catechists.

On September 25 2025, nine months after his 70th birthday, Halkett was made to retire in accordance with the Constitution and Canons of the Ecclesiastical Province of the Northern Lights, with a nine-month allowance from Diocesan Canons.

== Personal life ==
Halkett is married to Theresa, whom he met when she was working as an addictions counsellor in Montreal Lake. He has spoken publicly about his own recovery from addiction, often drawing on his personal story in ministry. Theresa's father, an Anglican priest, was among the people who prayed for and guided Halkett as he sought recovery and rediscovered his faith.

Anglican Communion titles
Preceded by Charles Arthurson (as suffragan indigenous bishop of Saskwatchwan)	Bishop of Missinipi; 2012–2025	Vacant
