= Rod Andrews =

Anglican bishop

The Rt. Rev Rodney Osborne Andrews is a retired Anglican bishop.

Born on 11 November 1940, educated at the University of Saskatchewan and ordained in 1965 he was involved in parish work and native ministry within the Diocese of Calgary until 1984. He was a military chaplain in the Diocese of Montreal after which he was Archdeacon of Algoma until 2000. He was Rector of St Alban's, Richmond and University Chaplain at UBC until 2004 when he became the Bishop of Saskatoon. He resigned his See in 2010.
Bishop Rodney holds an airline transport pilot's licence and is currently a flight instructor.

Religious titles
Preceded by Thomas Oliver Morgan	Bishop of Saskatoon; 2004–2010	Succeeded by David Irving
