= Henry Martin (bishop) =

Anglican bishop (1889–1971)

Henry David Martin (30 June 1889 – 27 March 1971) was an Anglican bishop in the middle third of the 20th century.

Born in London, England and educated at St Paul's School, London and the University of Toronto, he was ordained in 1916. He began his career at as a curate at St Luke, St John. After this he held a further curacy at St James' Cathedral, Toronto before being appointed Priest in charge at Holy Trinity Church, Winnipeg. After this he was Rector of St George's Church, in the same city for 21 years before being appointed Bishop of Saskatchewan in 1939. He resigned his See twenty years later.

Religious titles
| Preceded by Walter Burd | Bishop of Saskatchewan; 1939–1959 | Succeeded by Bill Crump |
