= Bill Crump =

Canadian Christian bishop

William Henry Howes Crump (13 March 1903 – 22 January 1994) was an Anglican bishop in the third quarter of the 20th century.

Born in London, Ontario on 13 March 1903 and educated at the University of Western Ontario, he was ordained in 1927. He was a Curate at Wawanesa, Manitoba and then Rector at Glenboro. After further incumbencies at Holland, Boissevain, Winnipeg and Calgary he became Bishop of Saskatchewan in 1960, serving for 11 years.

Religious titles
Preceded by Henry Martin	Bishop of Saskatchewan; 1960–1971	Succeeded by Vicars Short
