= John McLean (bishop) =

British-Canadian Anglican bishop (1828–1886)

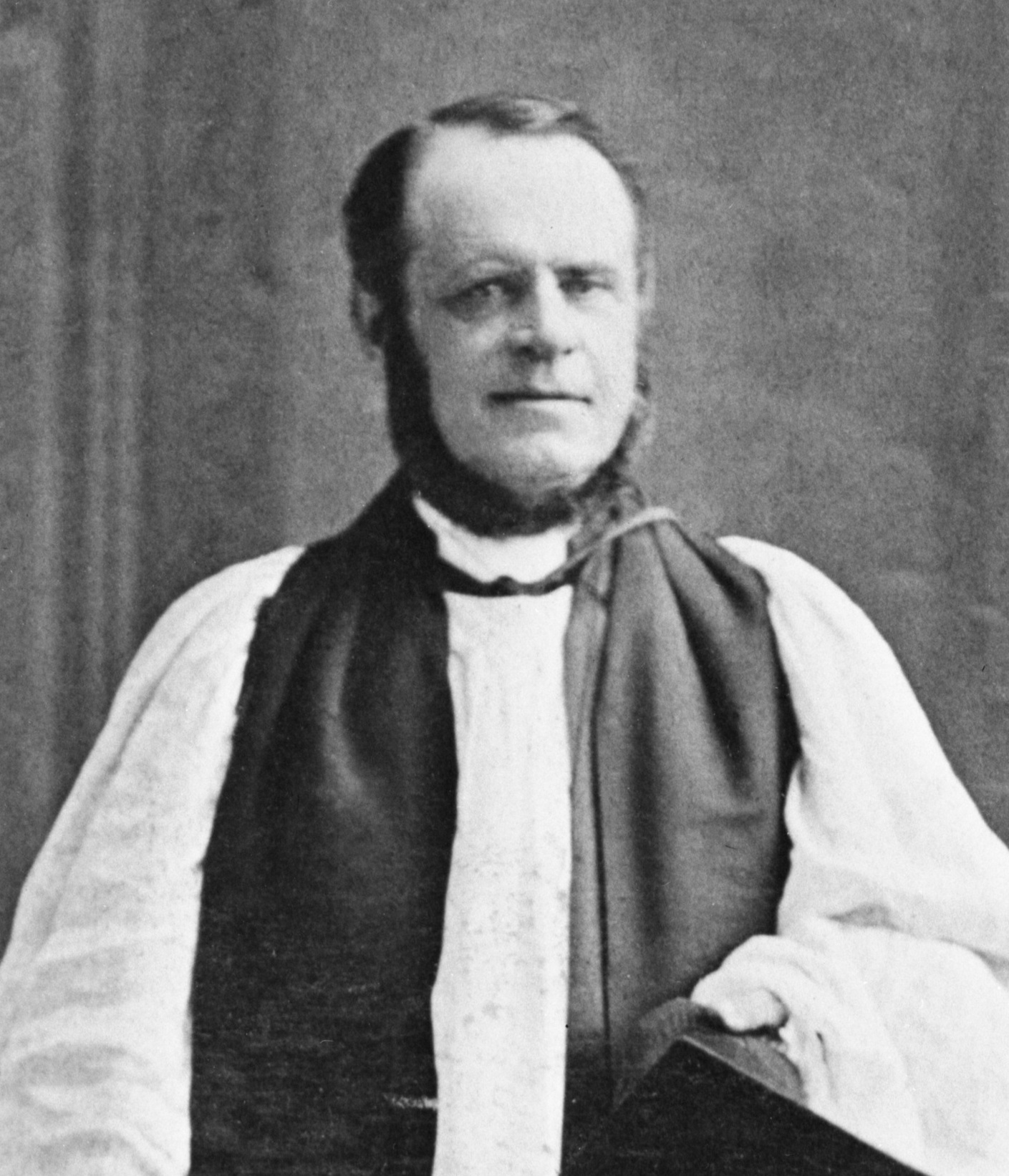
McLean c. 1870

John McLean (1828-1886) was the first Anglican Bishop of Saskatchewan.

== Life ==
He was born in 1828. He was the son of Charles Maclean of Portsoy, Banffshire. In 1847, he gained a bursary at King's College, Aberdeen, and in 1861 became M.A.

Through relations in business in London, he entered a counting-house there; became interested in the Church of England Young Men's Society, and took to studying foreign languages. In 1858, he was ordained by the Bishop of Ripon, and went out to Canada under the auspices of the Colonial and Continental Church Society, but soon became assistant to the Bishop of Huron in the cathedral at London, Ontario. In 1866, the Bishop of Rupert's Land, who had been at Aberdeen with Maclean, invited him to come into his diocese, and Maclean was appointed warden of St. John's College, rector of St. John's Cathedral, Winnipeg, and archdeacon of Assiniboia, a title afterwards altered to archdeacon of Manitoba.

Maclean worked hard; the population increased greatly with the growth of Winnipeg, and consisted in the country districts of very poor settlers. Visiting England in order to raise money for a new bishopric, the Society for the Propagation of the Gospel in Foreign Parts granted a certain income, and on 3 May 1874 he was consecrated bishop of Saskatchewan. His diocese consisted of 420,000 square miles of very poorly settled country, and no large subscriptions could be relied on from the inhabitants. However, Maclean managed, by energetically calling attention in England and Canada to the needs of the district, to secure a permanent endowment for the see and for Emanuel College at Alberta, which under his care became a university.

== Family ==
He died about 12 November 1886, and left a widow and children.

Religious titles
Preceded by Inaugural appointment	Bishop of Saskatchewan; 1874–1886	Succeeded by William Cyprian Pinkham
