= Tom Morgan (bishop) =

Retired bishop of the Anglican Church of Canada

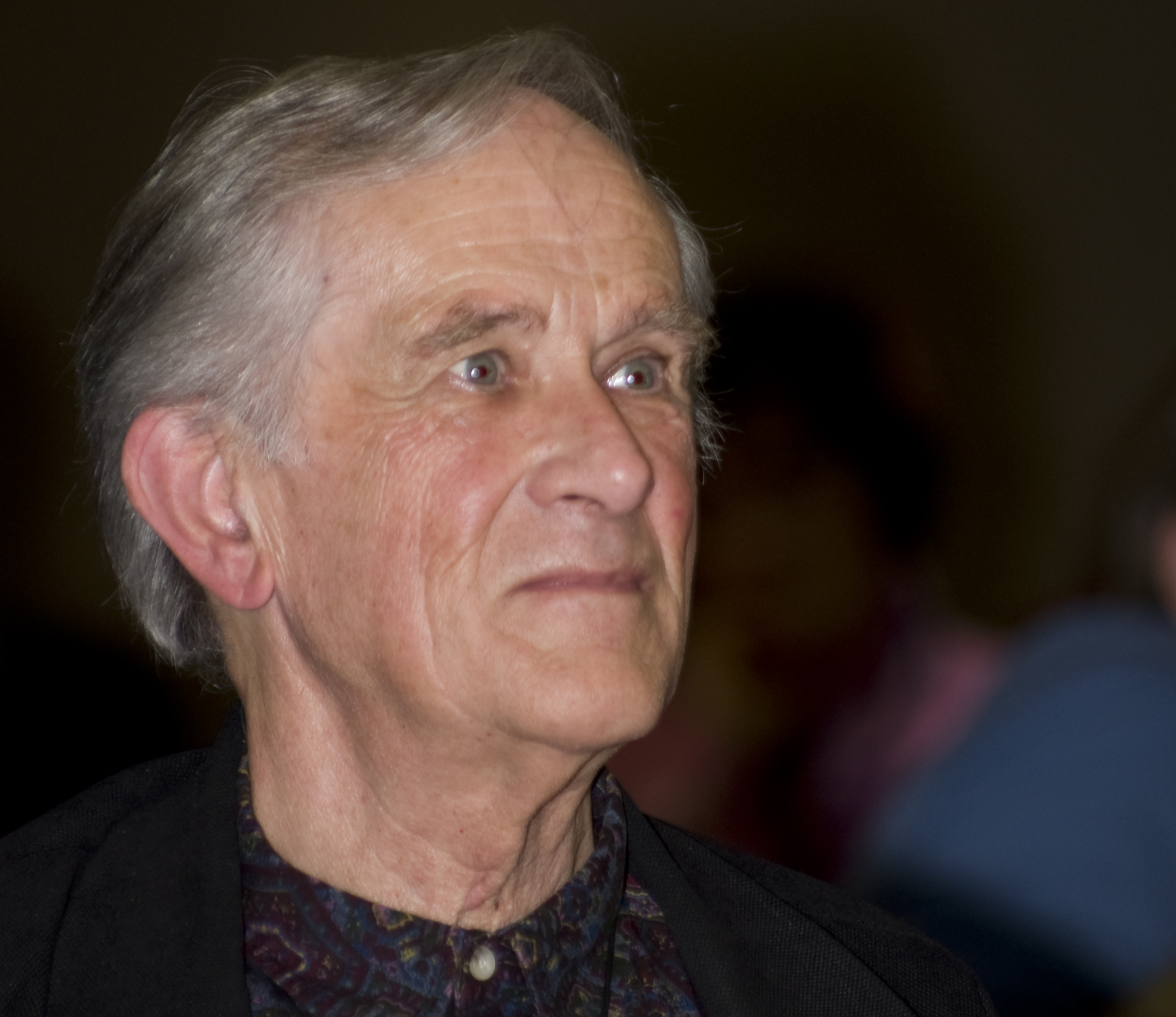

Thomas Oliver Morgan (born 20 January 1941) is a retired bishop of the Anglican Church of Canada.

Morgan was educated at the University of Saskatchewan and trained for the priesthood at King's College London and Tyndale Hall, Bristol. He began his ordained ministry as a curate at the Church of the Saviour, Blackburn, after which he was the incumbent of Porcupine Plain, Saskatchewan. After being rector of Kinistino he became Archdeacon of Indian Missions in the Diocese of Saskatchewan and then the diocesan Bishop of Saskatchewan in 1985. He was translated to be the Bishop of Saskatoon in 1993 and then became the Archbishop of Saskatoon and Metropolitan of the Ecclesiastical Province of Rupert's Land in 2000, resigning both positions in 2003.

Anglican Communion titles
Preceded by Vicars Short	Bishop of Saskatchewan; 1985–1993	Succeeded by Tony Burton
Preceded by Roland Wood	Bishop of Saskatoon; 1993–2003	Succeeded by Rod Andrews
Preceded by Barry Curtis	Metropolitan of Rupert's Land; 2000–2003	Succeeded by John Clarke
