= Cyprian Pinkham =

Anglican bishop (1844–1928)

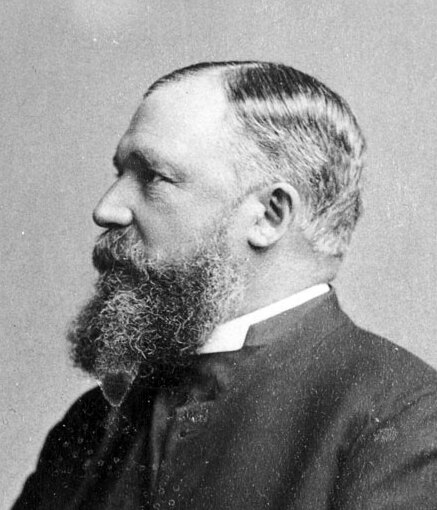
Pinkham c. 1900

William Cyprian Pinkham (1844–1928) was the second Anglican Bishop of Saskatchewan. He then became the first Bishop of Calgary when the diocese was divided in 1903.

Pinkham was born in St. John's, Newfoundland and educated at St Augustine's College, Canterbury. He was ordained in 1868 and his first position was as the incumbent of St. James's Manitoba. After this he was Superintendent of Education for the Protestant Public Schools of Manitoba and finally, before his ordination to the episcopate, the Archdeacon of Manitoba.

Pinkham retired in 1926 and died two years later.

Anglican Communion titles
| Preceded by John McLean | Bishop of Saskatchewan; 1886–1903 | Succeeded by Jervois Newnham |
| New office | Bishop of Calgary; 1903–1926 | Succeeded by Louis Sherman |
