= Stephen Andrews =

Canadian Anglican bishop

The Right Reverend Stephen Andrews
- Principal of Wycliffe College
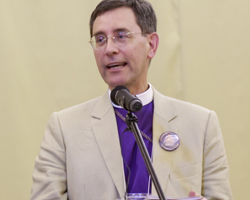
- Stephen Andrews at the Shingwauk Gathering and Conference, Algoma University, August 2012.
- Other post: Bishop of Algoma (2009–2016)

Orders
- Ordination: 1986 (diaconate); 1987 (priesthood)
- Consecration: June 21, 2009

Personal details
- Born: Stephen Gregory Weed Andrews; March 6, 1956 (age 70) United States
- Occupation: Anglican bishop, academic administrator
- Education: University of Colorado; Regent College; Wycliffe College, Toronto

Stephen Gregory Weed Andrews (born 1956) is an American-born Canadian Anglican bishop and academic administrator. He was Anglican Bishop of Algoma from 2009 to 2016. From 2016 to 2025, he was principal of Wycliffe College, Toronto.

== Early life and education ==
He studied classics at the University of Colorado and theology at Regent College and Wycliffe College, gaining an M.Div. degree in 1984. After spending two years in London as a study assistant to John Stott, he was ordained in the Diocese of Nova Scotia and Prince Edward Island in 1986. In 2016 Andrews was awarded an honorary Doctorate of Sacred Theology by Thorneloe University in Sudbury, Ontario. In 2010 Bishop Andrews was awarded an honorary Doctorate of Divinity by Wycliffe College.

Andrews is married with two daughters.

== Ordained ministry ==
He then served as assistant curate at St Paul's, Halifax until 1990 and in 1994 was appointed rector of The Cathedral Church of St. Alban the Martyr in Prince Albert, Saskatchewan and Dean of Saskatchewan, serving in those roles until 2001.

In 2001 he was appointed president, vice chancellor and provost of Thorneloe University, working in that capacity until his consecration as bishop of Algoma in 2008. He left the Diocese of Algoma to become principal of Wycliffe College, Toronto in August 2016.

Anglican Communion titles
Preceded by Tony Burton	Dean of Saskatchewan; 1994–2001	Succeeded by Michael Hawkins
Preceded by Ron Ferris	Bishop of Algoma; 2009-2016	Succeeded by Anne Germond
