= William Hallam (bishop) =

Anglican bishop

- Bishop of Saskatchewan; later Bishop of Saskatoon
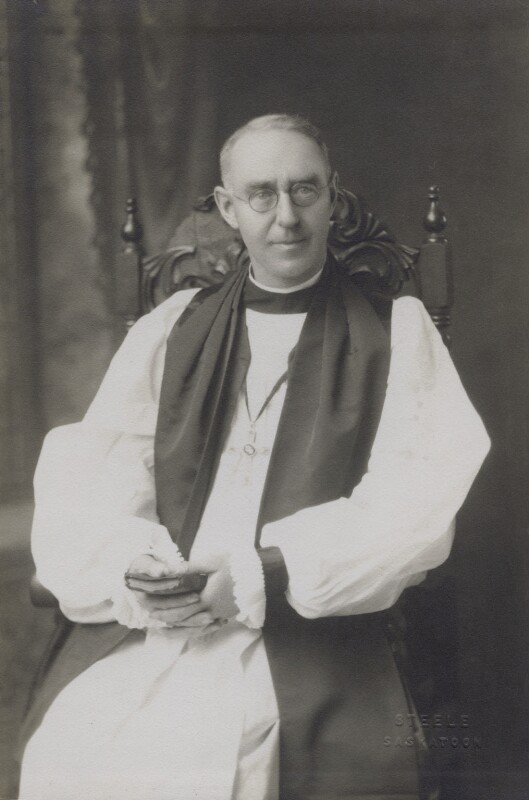

Orders
- Consecration: 28 October 1931 by Isaac Stringer

Personal details
- Education: Dalhousie University

William Thomas Thompson Hallam (1878 – 25 July 1956) was an Anglican bishop.

== Biography ==
Born in 1878 he was educated at Dalhousie University and began his ordained ministry as a curate at Lindsay, Ontario after which he was the incumbent of Cannington. He was next Professor of Divinity at Wycliffe College, Toronto, Ontario. After this he was Principal of Emmanuel College, Saskatoon and then Rector of the Church of Ascension, Hamilton. He became Bishop of Saskatchewan in 1931 and, when the diocese divided in 1933, the inaugural Bishop of Saskatoon.

He retired in 1949 and died on 25 July 1956.

Religious titles
| Preceded by George Exton Lloyd | Bishop of Saskatchewan; 1931–1933 | Succeeded by Walter Burd |
| Preceded by Inaugural appointment | Bishop of Saskatoon; 1933–1949 | Succeeded by Wilfred Eastland Fuller |
