= David Irving (bishop) =

Bishop of Saskatoon; Canadian Anglican bishop

David Irving was the Bishop of Saskatoon from 2010 to 2018. Ordained in 1986, he was previously Archdeacon of Kootenay.

Religious titles
Preceded by Rod Andrews	Bishop of Saskatoon; 2010–2018	Succeeded by Chris Harper
