= Stanley Steer =

Stanley Charles Steer (2 June 1900 – 10 December 1997) was an Anglican bishop.

He was born in Farnham and educated at the Royal Grammar School, Guildford and the University of Saskatchewan.

He was successively

- Missionary at Vanderhoof, British Columbia
- Chaplain, St Mark's Church, Alexandria, British Columbia
- Chaplain and Fellow, University College, Oxford
- Chaplain, The Mercers' Company, City of London
- Principal, Emmanuel College, Saskatoon
- Bishop of Saskatoon

Religious titles
Preceded by Wilfred Eastland Fuller	Bishop of Saskatoon; 1950–1970	Succeeded by Douglas Albert Ford
