= Charles Arthurson =

Canadian Anglican bishop (1937–2025)

The Right Reverend Charles Arthurson
- Suffragan Bishop of Saskatchewan
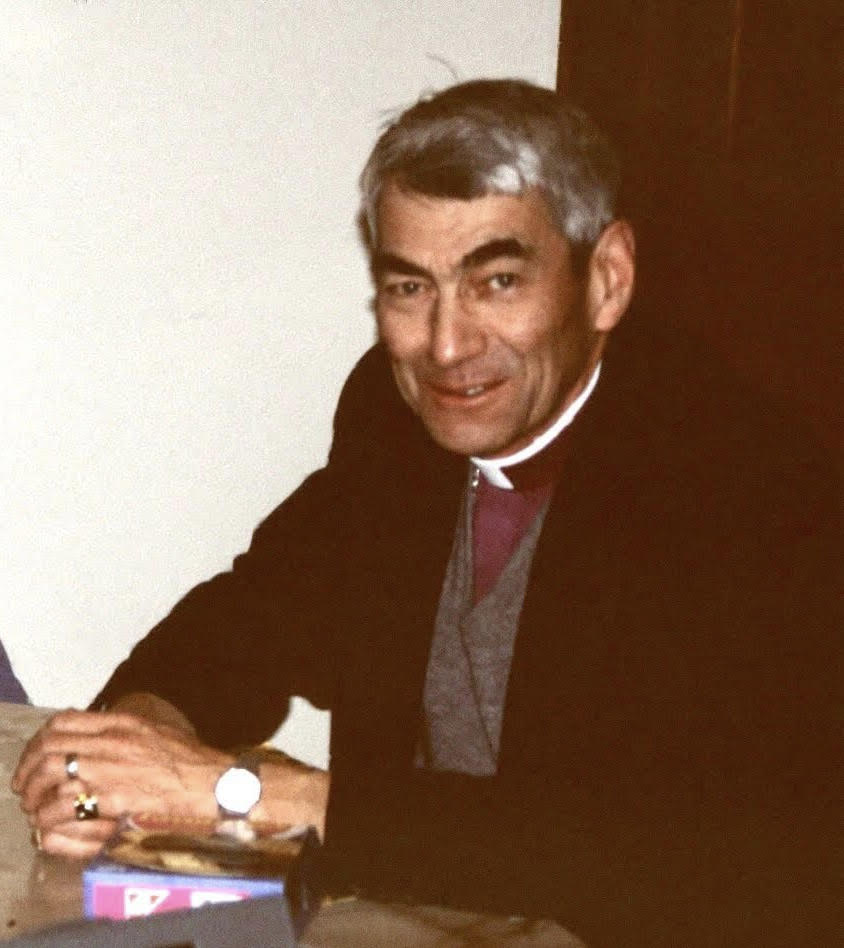
- Church: Anglican Church of Canada
- Diocese: Saskatchewan
- In office: 1989–2008
- Predecessor: Office established
- Successor: Adam Halkett
- Other posts: Rector of All Saints, La Ronge (part-time)

Orders
- Consecration: 25 January 1989 by Walter H. Jones

Personal details
- Born: July 3, 1937 Norway House, Manitoba, Canada
- Died: August 30, 2025 (aged 88) Prince Albert, Saskatchewan, Canada

Charles "Charlie" John Arthurson (July 3, 1937 – August 30, 2025) was a Canadian Anglican bishop who served as suffragan bishop in the Diocese of Saskatchewan from 1989 until his retirement in 2008. He was of Cree heritage and became in 1989 the first Indigenous person to be consecrated a bishop in the Anglican Church of Canada.

== Early life and ministry ==
Arthurson was born on July 3, 1937 in the Norway House area of Manitoba. A member of the Cree First Nation community, he was ordained in 1972 in the Diocese of Keewatin. As a priest he served in several northern parishes in Manitoba and Ontario, including Shamattawa and Norway House and Big Trout Lake, Split Lake and Sioux Lookout. In 1983 he and his family moved to La Ronge, Saskatchewan.

== Suffragan bishop of Saskatchewan ==
In 1989 Arthurson was elected suffragan bishop of the Diocese of Saskatchewan, assisting the diocesan bishop in overseeing the northern parishes. His election made him the first Indigenous bishop in the Anglican Church of Canada. He continued in that role until retiring in 2008. After retirement he remained active in ministry, serving part-time as rector of All Saints Anglican Church in La Ronge.

== Personal life and death ==
Arthurson was married to Faye Arthurson (née Bryer), a schoolteacher; to whom he had two children, Devon and Ritchie. After a bout of poor health, Arthurson died on the evening of August 30, 2025, at the age of 88.

== Honours ==
In 2002 he was awarded the Queen Elizabeth II Golden Jubilee Medal for his service to the church and community.

Anglican Communion titles
New title	Suffragan Bishop of Saskatchewan; 1989–2008	Succeeded by Adam Halkett
