= St. John's College, Manitoba =

Anglican college in Manitoba, Canada

Coordinates: 49°48′38″N 97°08′13″W

St. John's College
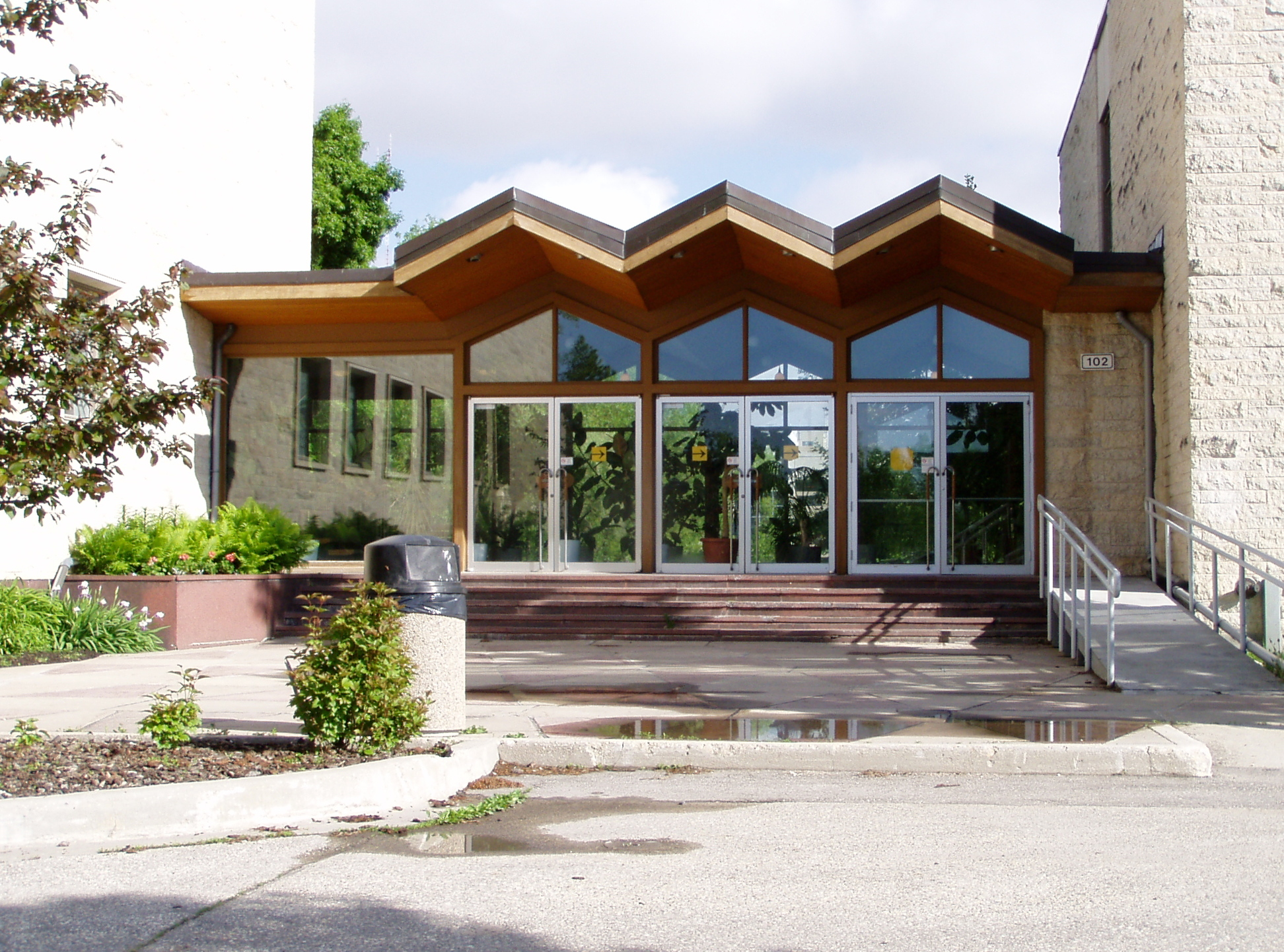
- Entrance of St. John's College
- Motto: "In Thy light we shall see light" (Psalm 36, verse 9).
- Type: Public
- Established: 1 November 1866
- Religious affiliation: Anglican Church of Canada
- Academic affiliations: AUCC, IAU, AUFC, ACU
- Chancellor: Geoffrey Woodcroft
- Vice-Chancellor: Allison Abra
- Academic staff: 40
- Administrative staff: 20
- Location: 92 Dysart Rd, Winnipeg, MB, R3T 2M5, Canada
- Campus: Urban
- Colours: Black & gold
- Website: www.umanitoba.ca/colleges/st_johns/anglican/index.html

St. John's College is an Anglican-based independent constituent college of the University of Manitoba, located on the university's Fort Garry campus in Winnipeg, Manitoba.

The college is the oldest Anglophone institution of higher learning in western Canada and maintains its strong connection to the Anglican Church of Canada.

The University of Manitoba Press has its office in 301 St. John's College. St. John's College, itself, operates a small publisher at the U of M called St. John's College Press.

== History ==
With a strong Anglican affiliation, St John's College was officially opened by the newly arrived Bishop Robert Machray on 1 November 1866. The roots of the college, however, lie in the early years of the Red River Colony, where it served as a school for the settlers.

=== Background ===
The first Anglican cleric in the Northwest interior of Canada was the Reverend John West who, in 1820, established the first Anglican school in the Red River Colony (or Red River Settlement). In 1849, the growth of the Colony led to the creation of the Diocese of Rupert's Land, for which the first bishop was David Anderson.

When Anderson arrived at Red River, he established the first school to bear the name "St. John's". For the school and the proposed theological college that would grow from it, Anderson chose the motto that remains the college motto to this day: "In Thy light we shall see light" (Psalm 36, verse 9). The new school provided both academic and missionary instruction to the people of the settlement and of the North. By 1859, declining enrolment and a lack of qualified teachers forced the bishop to close the school.

=== Establishment ===
In 1865, Robert Machray became the Bishop of Rupert's Land, arriving in the Red River Settlement later that same year. Recognizing the need for an Anglican college, Machray set about finding the necessary funds to reopen St. John's. The buildings from Bishop Anderson's school were renovated, while others were acquired to house the new school's boarders and faculty. The Reverend John Mclean came from London, Ontario, to become the college's first warden.

When the school was reopened on 1 November 1866 (All Saints' Day), it had 19 boys attending as either boarders or day students and 3 students enrolled in theology courses.

In 1877, St John's College consolidated with St. Boniface College (Roman Catholic) and the Manitoba College (Presbyterian) to become the founding colleges of the University of Manitoba. This consolidation was a way to strengthen the small and financially insecure College; nonetheless, St John's maintained, and continues to maintain, its strong connection to the Anglican Church.

In 1882, planning began of a new building for the college at a 4-acre lot on the west side of Winnipeg's Main Street at Church Avenue. The 3½-storey brick building was completed in 1884 at an approximate cost of $55,000. It had several classrooms as well as residential space for 20 students. In mid-1945, the college moved to a more central location in downtown Winnipeg and the building was demolished in 1950.

=== Later development ===
By 1900, the college had become a coeducational, liberal arts college, as professional education expanded beyond the traditional fields of theology, law, and medicine in the early part of the 20th century. Graduate training based on the German-inspired American model of specialized course work and the completion of a research thesis was introduced.

In 1912, a 3-storey brick-&-stone structure was built on Church Avenue in Winnipeg to provide additional classroom and residential space for the nearby St. John's College. The basement had two classrooms, washrooms, a day room for students, and a mechanical room. On the main level were 3 classrooms, library, ladies’ parlour, and cloakroom, Master's room, Warden's office, and 4 bedrooms. The second and third floors each had a central communal bathroom and 16 bedrooms.

The college moved to the University of Manitoba's Fort Garry campus in 1958, with dormitories for men and women to the east, teaching and administration to the west, and the chapel to the north.

The policy of university education that was initiated in the 1960s responded to population pressure and the belief that higher education was a key to social justice and economic productivity for individuals and for society.

The stained glass at the college has since been documented by the Institute for Stained Glass in Canada.

St. John's College's arms were registered with the Canadian Heraldic Authority on 15 October 2006.

== Administration and governance ==
As an independent constituent college of the University of Manitoba, St. John's College is governed under the terms of the act of its incorporation, Act to incorporate St John's College (Chapter 39 of the Statues of the Province of Manitoba, 1871, re-enacted in 1990 as Chapter 171). The statutes of the college are amended, repealed, or replaced by the Synod of the Diocese of Rupert's Land, most recently in 1992 and 2002.

The college is governed through a bicameral system: The College Council determines the overall direction, policies, and financing of the college; and the College Assembly has responsibility for academic matters within the college and for the day-to-day operation of the college (including approving the annual budget) within the fiscal policies established by Council.

The council is also responsible for maintaining a direct formal connection with the Diocese of Rupert's Land. The council has representation from both the Diocese and from Assemble, including at least 1 student. All Fellows and Officers of the college are members of Assembly, which also includes representation from students of the college and Diocesan Council.

While having its own Council and Assembly, in all academic matters other than the Theology program, the college is subject to the regulations of the University of Manitoba Senate.

Wardens of St. John's College
Period	Head
1866–73	John Mclean
1873–1904	Robert Machray
1904–21	George Frederick Coombes
1921–34	George Anderson Wells
1935–41	Walter Foster Barfoot
1941–43	R. S. K. Seeley
1943–50	R. J. Pierce
1950–60	Laurence Frank “Laurie” Wilmot
1961–68	Cecil C. Landon
1968–70	Blake Wood [acting]
1970–80	James R. Brown
1985-86	Francis Carroll [acting]
1980–97	Murdith McLean
1992–93	Mary Kinnear [acting]
1997–2011	Janet A. Hoskins
2011–2021	Christopher G. Trott
2021-Present	Allison Abra

== Student life ==
The college has its own residence for students attending the University of Manitoba, which has a membership of 100 students.

Students at St. John's are represented by the St. John's College Students' Association (SJCSA).

== Sport ==
See the St.John's Rugby Football Club for an early Canadian football team founded and operated for 31 seasons by St. John's College students.
