= Michael Hawkins (bishop) =

The Right Reverend Michael Hawkins
- Bishop of Saskatchewan
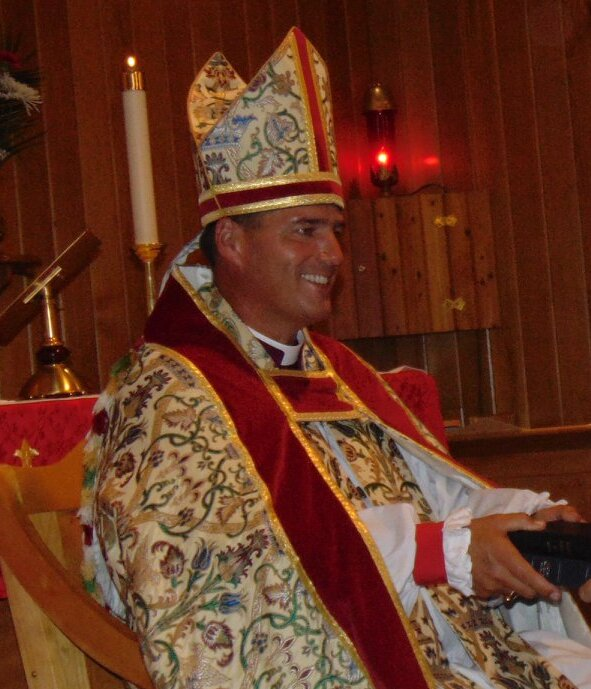
- Hawkins in 2018
- Diocese: Saskatchewan
- Predecessor: Tony Burton
- Successor: Richard Reed

Orders
- Ordination: 1988 - deacon 1989 - priest
- Consecration: 2009

Personal details
- Spouse: Kathryn Hawkins
- Education: University of King's College Trinity College, University of Toronto

Michael William Hawkins is a Canadian Anglican bishop. He was Bishop of Saskatchewan from 2009 until his retirement in 2023. He was previously, from 2001 to 2009, the Dean of Saskatchewan and Rector of St Alban's Cathedral.

Hawkins studied at Dalhousie University and the University of King's College in Halifax before becoming a Master of Divinity at Trinity College, Toronto. He was ordained as a deacon in 1988 and a priest in June 1989. He then served as rector of Pugwash and River John from 1988 to 1993 and Petite Rivière and New Dublin from 1993 to 2001 in the Diocese of Nova Scotia and Prince Edward Island. In 2001 he was appointed rector of St. Alban's Cathedral, Prince Albert and Dean of Saskatchewan. He was consecrated Bishop of Saskatchewan on 6 March 2009.

In 2009, Hawkins received an honorary doctorate from the University of King's College.

In late 2020, Hawkins contracted a near-fatal case of COVID-19 that resulted in two separate stays in intensive care. Following his initial recovery, he became a vocal critic of the provincial government's pandemic response, describing the prioritization of economic interests over life-saving measures as "morally reprehensible." On 14 October 2022, Hawkins announced his intention to resign as Bishop of Saskatchewan, citing ongoing health struggles related to long COVID. In a charge to the diocesan synod, he noted that while his physical health had improved, his cognitive function and mental health remained compromised, making it difficult to meet the demands of his office. His resignation became effective on 30 April 2023. He was succeeded by Richard Reed in 2024.

Hawkins is a trustee of the Elliott House of Studies.

Anglican Communion titles
Preceded by Stephen Andrews	Dean of Saskatchewan; 2001–2009	Succeeded by Kenneth Davis
Preceded by Tony Burton	Bishop of Saskatchewan; 2009–2023	Succeeded by Richard Reed
