= Tony Burton (bishop) =

Anglican bishop

The Right Reverend Tony Burton
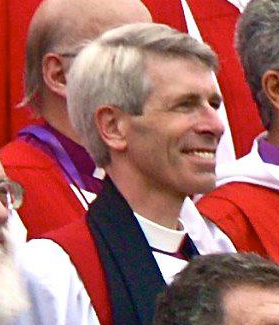
- Province: Anglican Church of Canada
- Diocese: Saskatchewan
- See: St. Alban's Cathedral, Prince Albert
- Installed: 1993
- Term ended: 2008
- Predecessor: Thomas Morgan
- Successor: Michael Hawkins
- Other posts: Rector of the Church of the Incarnation; Dean of Saskatchewan

Orders
- Ordination: 1987
- Consecration: 1993

Personal details
- Born: Anthony John Burton; 1959 (age 66–67) Ottawa, Ontario, Canada
- Spouse: Anna Burton
- Children: 2
- Education: Trinity College, University of Toronto; Dalhousie University; Wycliffe Hall, University of Oxford

Anthony John Burton (born 1959) is an Anglican bishop. He was formerly the Bishop of Saskatchewan in the Anglican Church of Canada. He was the rector of the Church of the Incarnation in Dallas, Texas, from 2008 to 2022. On February 13, 2022, Burton announced that he would retire as rector of the Church of the Incarnation in September 2022.

Burton was born in Ottawa, Ontario, Canada. He was educated at Trinity College at the University of Toronto; Dalhousie University in Halifax, Nova Scotia; and Wycliffe Hall, Oxford.

Burton was ordained in the Diocese of Nova Scotia in 1987, where he served in two parishes on Cape Breton Island. In 1991 he moved to Prince Albert, Saskatchewan, where he served as Dean of Saskatchewan and rector of St. Alban’s Cathedral before being elected as bishop of the Diocese of Saskatchewan in 1993. At the time of his election Burton was the youngest bishop in the worldwide Anglican Communion and the youngest Canadian bishop of the 20th century. He spent a term as chair of the Council of the North and also served as a co-chair of the Canadian Anglican-Roman Catholic Dialogue, as the episcopal visitor to the South American Mission Society, and as patron or officer of a variety of institutions, societies, and organizations. He was a member of the Council of General Synod (the executive committee of General Synod) and of the council's planning committee.

From 2008 to 2022, Burton was the rector of the Church of the Incarnation in Dallas, Texas. He is also the chairman of the board of trustees of the Elliott House of Studies, a visitor of Ralston College, and a member of the Steering Committee of the Communion Partner Rectors. He serves on the board of trustees of The Anglican Digest.

Anglican Communion titles
Preceded by Bruce Stavert	Dean of Saskatchewan; 1991–1993	Succeeded by Stephen Andrews
Preceded by Thomas Morgan	Bishop of Saskatchewan; 1993–2008	Succeeded by Michael Hawkins
