= Rugby Chapel =

Coordinates: 52°8′N 106°37′W

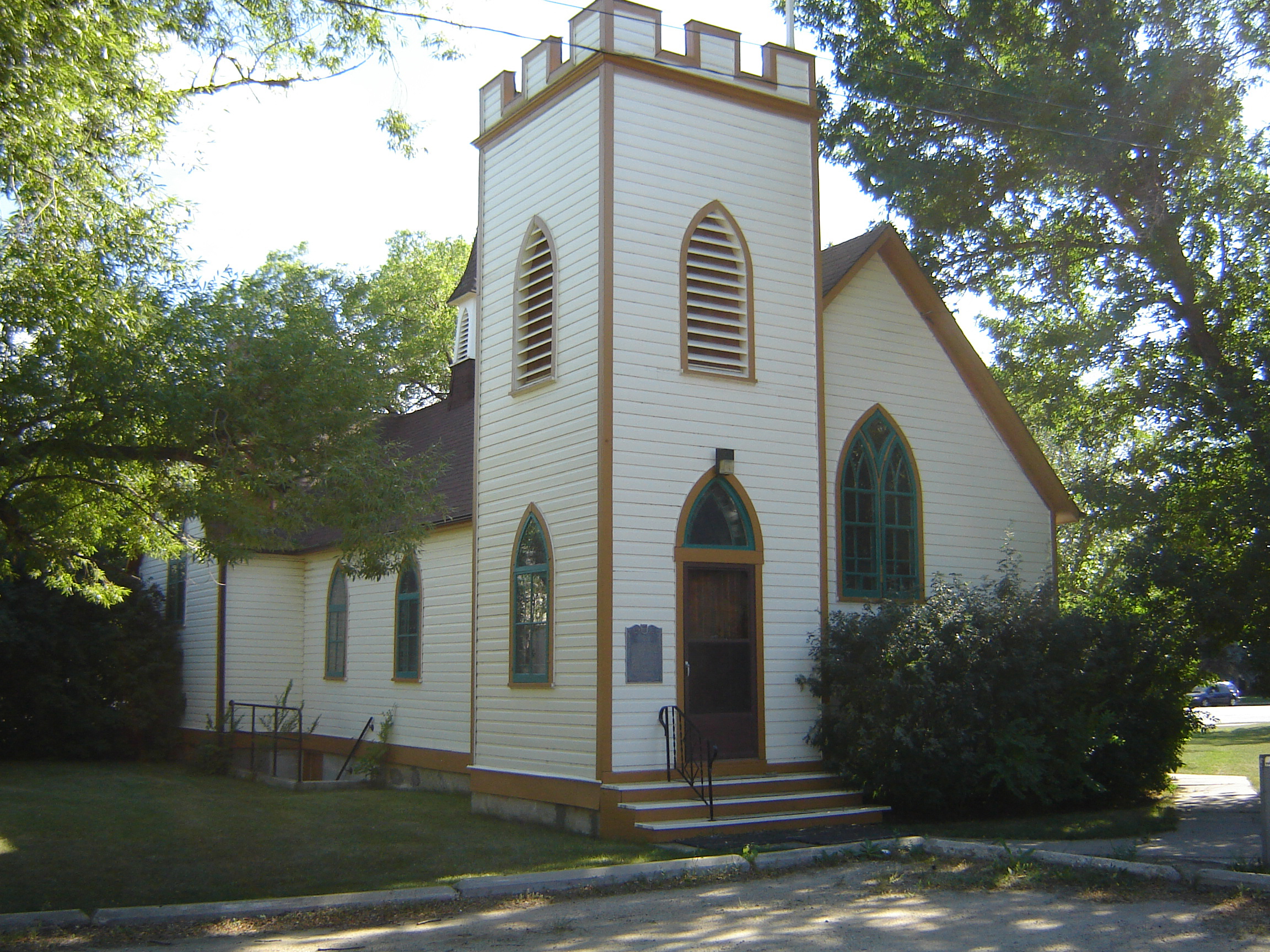
- Rugby Chapel
- Interactive map of the Rugby Chapel area

General information
- Location: Saskatoon, Canada
- Construction started: 1883 in P.A.; 1910 moved to Saskatoon
- Completed: 1912
- Client: University of Saskatchewan

Rugby Chapel is a municipal historic site which is part of the University of Saskatchewan (USask). USask is the largest education institution in the Canadian province of Saskatchewan. The University of Saskatchewan location next to the South Saskatchewan River was across from the city centre of Saskatoon. In 1879, the Rt. Rev. John McLean started a schooling system in Prince Albert which was renamed the University of Saskatchewan in 1883. In 1909, when the University of Saskatchewan was established in Saskatoon, Emmanuel College moved its college buildings to Saskatoon. The Institute for stained glass in Canada has documented the stained glass at Rugby Chapel.

== City of Saskatoon Plaque ==
Rugby Chapel

Rugby Chapel built in 1912 with funds raised by the students in Rugby School in England, served as the major place of worship for Emmanuel College, until the opening of St. Chad's Chapel in 1966, and still serves as a place of education and worship.

A wooden version of an English Stone-built church, the chapel has a wooden vault support structure, gothic windows and a Norman tower over the porch.

Rugby Chapel is a symbol of the importance of the Anglican Church and the British people in the early development of the West and of the contribution made by Emmanuel College (now the College of Emmanuel and St. Chad) to theological education in Western Canada.

== University of Saskatchewan plaque ==
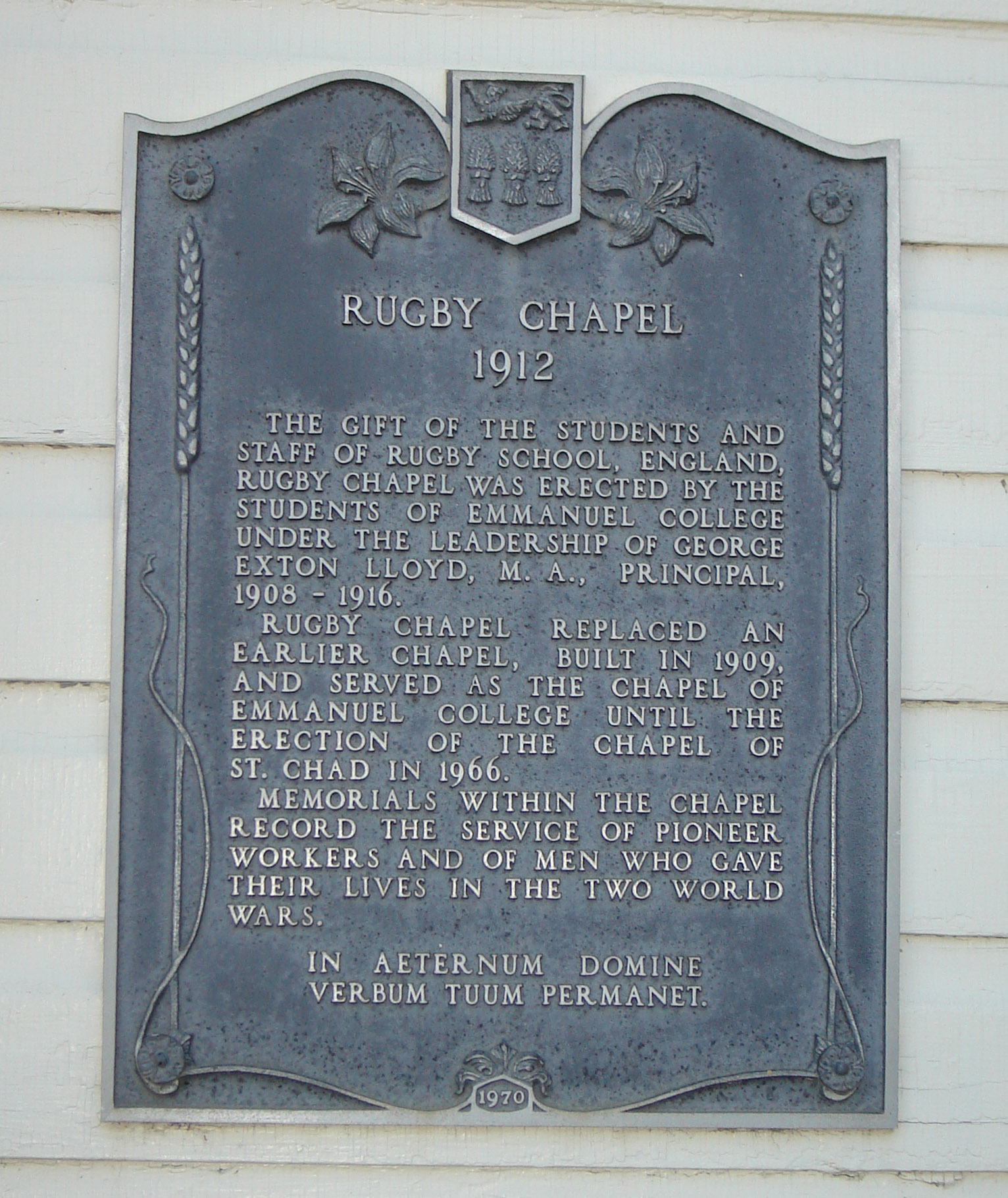
Rugby Chapel

Rugby Chapel

1912

The gift of the students and staff of Rugby School, England, Rugby Chapel was erected by the students of Emmanuel College under the leadership of George Exton Lloyd, M.A., Principal, 1908-1916.

Rugby Chapel replaced an earlier chapel, built in 1909, and served as the chapel of Emmanuel College until the erection of the Chapel of St. Chad in 1966.

Memorials within the Chapel record the service of pioneer workers and of men who gave their lives in the two world wars.

In Aeternum Domine Verbum Tuum Permanet

1970

== Nearby ==
- College Building on the University of Saskatchewan campus was designated an official National Historic Site of Canada.
- Victoria One Room school House moved to the University of Saskatchewan campus was designated an official heritage site.

== See also ==
- List of colleges in Canada § Saskatchewan
- List of universities in Canada § Saskatchewan
- University of Saskatchewan
