= George Exton Lloyd =

Anglican bishop of Saskatchewan, Canada (1861–1940)

George Lloyd
- Anglican Bishop of Saskatchewan
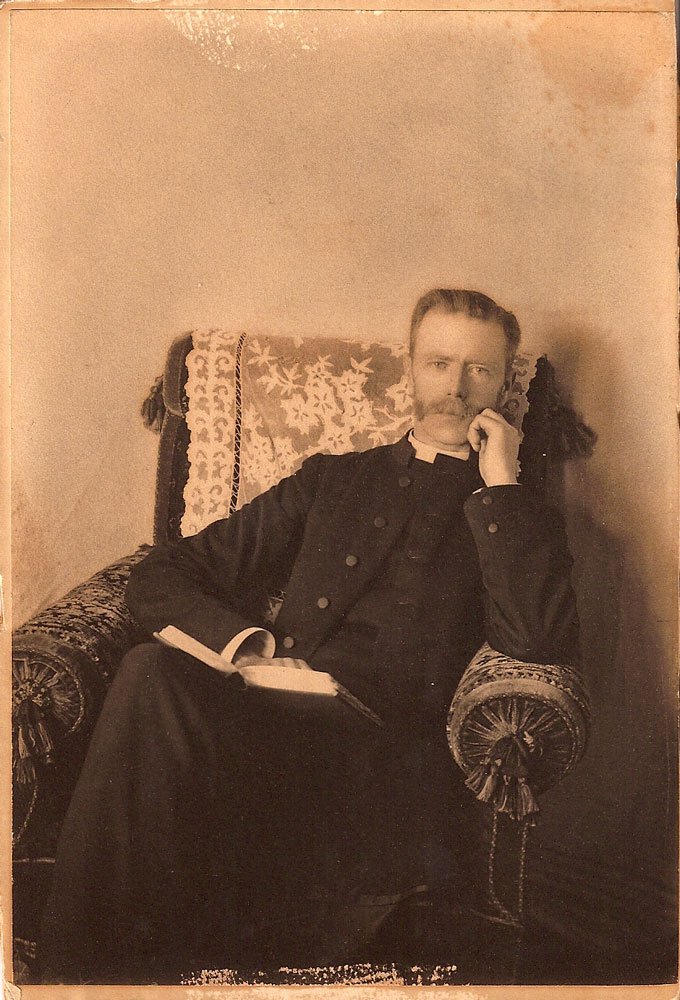
- Church: Anglican Church of Canada
- See: Saskatchewan
- In office: 1922–1931
- Predecessor: Jervois Arthur Newnham
- Successor: William Thomas Thompson Hallam

Orders
- Ordination: 1885

Personal details
- Born: 6 January 1861 London, England
- Died: 8 December 1940 (aged 79) Victoria, British Columbia
- Spouse: Marion Tuppen

George Exton Lloyd (January 6, 1861 – December 8, 1940) was an Anglican bishop and theologian who helped found Lloydminster, a city on the border of the provinces of Alberta and Saskatchewan in Canada. He served as Bishop of Saskatchewan from 1922 to 1931.

== Early life and education ==
Lloyd was born in London, England, and was educated privately and at St. John's College, London. He arrived in Canada in 1881, to study theology at Wycliffe College and the University of Toronto.

== North-West Rebellion ==
Before graduating he joined the Queen's Own Rifles of Canada and fought in the North-West Rebellion, commonly known as the Riel Rebellion. He distinguished himself at the Battle of Cut Knife, near Battleford, Saskatchewan, by providing covering fire for Edward Acheson, who was to be the father of future US Secretary of State Dean Acheson. Lloyd was severely wounded in this action.

== Marriage and children ==
Lloyd was ordained in Winnipeg in 1885 and married Marion Tuppen in the same year. They traveled to Rothesay, New Brunswick, where he took over a private co-educational day school known as Thompson's School. He renamed the school Rothesay College for Boys and eventually found a patron in the prominent local citizen James F. Robertson who established the school as Rothesay Collegiate School, later to become Rothesay Netherwood School.

== Barr Colony and Lloydminster ==
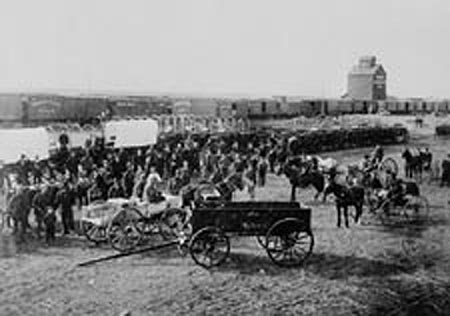
Barr colonists 1903

In 1900 he returned to England. When he wrote a letter to The Times of London in 1902 proposing Western Canada as a good destination for emigration, he received thousands of replies. He became involved in an emigration project with Isaac Montgomery Barr and emigrated with his family with the Barr colonists. Although Barr was able to interest more than 2,600 colonists in emigrating, arrangements for their transportation and care were generally insufficient. For example, they crossed the ocean in a former troop carrier designed to hold a maximum of 900 passengers. In Saint John, New Brunswick, Barr disappeared and Lloyd had to step in and arrange rail transportation to Saskatoon, where Barr turned up again. About 1,500 remaining colonists (the rest had stayed in Manitoba) made the rest of the 275 km (170 mile) trip by wagon and on foot.

By the time they reached Battleford (very near where Lloyd had been wounded in the North-West Rebellion 18 years earlier), the colonists' discontent with Barr came to a head. They asked Lloyd to take over leadership of the colony. and eventually named their settlement "Lloydminster" in his honour. Lloyd and his family remained with the settlement for a few years, then moved to Prince Albert, Saskatchewan, and became principal of Emmanuel College (1908–1916) where he helped students erect Rugby Chapel.

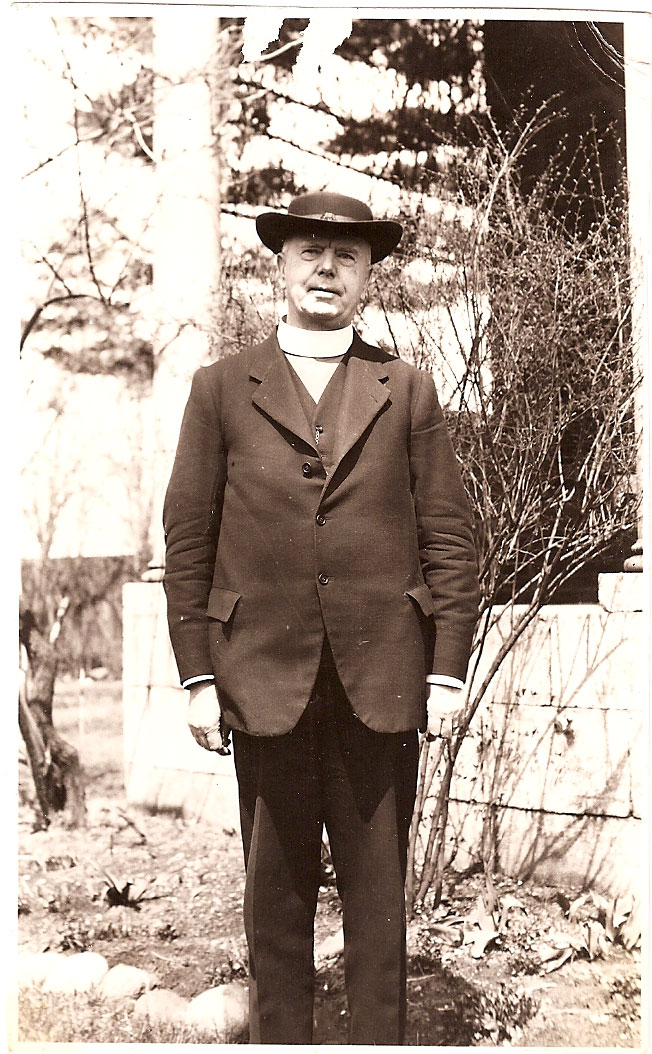
Lloyd in the 1930s

== Bishop of Saskatchewan ==
In 1922, Lloyd was made Bishop of Saskatchewan, serving in that capacity until 1931, when he retired to British Columbia. He died in 1940.

== Character and beliefs ==
Lloyd believed that Canada should be populated by British immigrants. In 1928 he wrote a letter to The Globe and Mail stating that the Canadian Pacific Railway was "dumping aliens" into the West, and that government policies should be set restricting the numbers of "non-preferred Europeans". In his capacity as a rector and teacher in the West he took pains to ensure that the children of non-British immigrants were encouraged to learn English and to learn about British history. In a letter to his clergy, he characterized Eastern Europeans as "dirty, ignorant, garlic-smelling, and undesirable continentalists". Lloyd also stated that "the real question at stake is not whether these people can grow potatoes, but whether you would like your daughter to marry them" and declared that Canada was in danger of becoming a "mongrel nation".

Lloyd stated that he wanted Black and Asian Canadians shipped back to "where they came from", a proposal so extreme that not even the Ku Klux Klan in Canada supported it.

He started an initiative within the Anglican diocese of Saskatchewan that there be no distinction between the sexes in the choice of delegates or committee members.

He is described by Bishop Walter Burd, his successor, as follows: "an imposing figure in his gaiters and unusual hat and his cane — rather than invite discussion he made pronouncements, 'Young man, there is no hope for men who have holes in the seats of their trousers, but there is hope for men who have holes in the knees of their trousers.'"

== Arms ==
Coat of arms of George Exton Lloyd
Crest A winged dexter hand fesswise Or, holding a cross crosslet fitché Gules entwined by a scroll Argent inscribed “Lloydminster” in letters Sable. Escutcheon Or a cross crosslet Gules between 1st and 4th a boar’s head erased and 2nd and 3rd a horse’s head erased Sable. Motto KEEP TO THE TRAIL

== See also ==
- Lloydminster
- History of Saskatchewan

Religious titles
Preceded by Jervois Arthur Newnham	Anglican Bishop of Saskatchewan; 1922–1931	Succeeded by William Thomas Thompson Hallam
