= Cook School for Christian Leadership =

Presbyterian educational organization

Coordinates: 33°25′24″N 111°57′59″W

The Cook School for Christian Leadership was a school located in Tempe, Arizona, and affiliated with the Presbyterian Church (USA). It was founded in 1911. The school closed in 2008, with proceeds of the land sale used to establish the grant-making Cook Native American Ministries Foundation .
