= Anglican Diocese of Saskatoon =

Diocese of the Anglican Church in Canada

Coordinates: 52.50°N 105.91°W

Diocese of Saskatoon
- Coat of arms

Location
- Ecclesiastical province: Northern Lights
- Archdeaconries: 3

Statistics
- Parishes: 19 (2022)
- Members: 1,500 (2022)

Information
- Rite: Anglican
- Cathedral: Cathedral of St. John the Evangelist, Saskatoon

Current leadership
- Bishop: Chad McCharles

Map
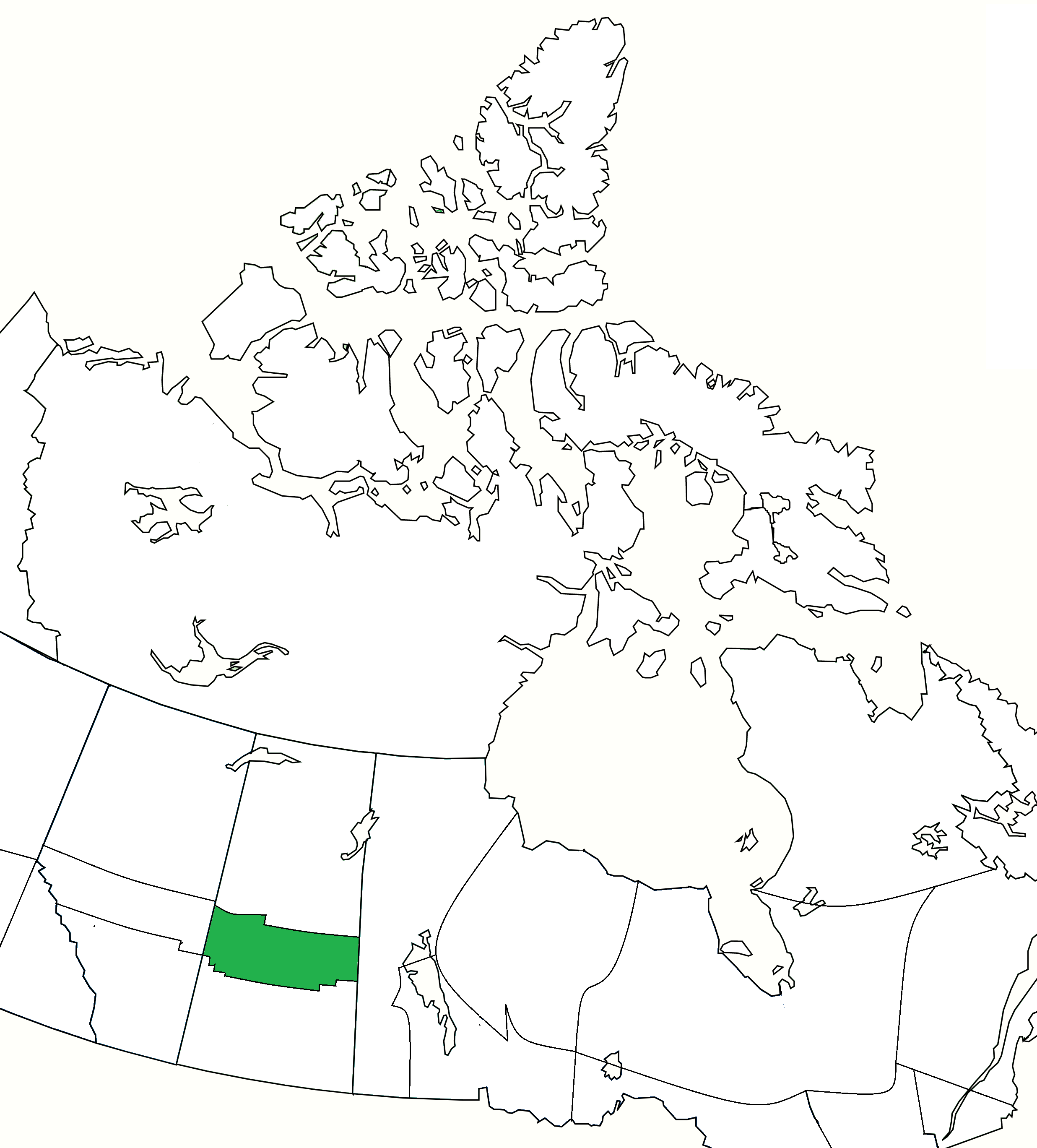
- Boundaries of the diocese within the Province of the Northern Lights

Website
- Anglican Diocese of Saskatoon

The Diocese of Saskatoon is a diocese of the Ecclesiastical Province of the Northern Lights of the Anglican Church of Canada. Its territory is a band across the middle of the province of Saskatchewan. It was separated from the Anglican Diocese of Saskatchewan in 1933. The motto of the diocese is Sursum Corda - Lift up your hearts, a phrase from the service of Holy Communion. The cathedral church is St. John the Evangelist, built in 1912. Many rural parishes are multi-point charges.

== Bishops of Saskatoon ==
Previous bishops were bishops of Anglican Diocese of Saskatchewan. After the division of the diocese. Bishop Hallam continued after 1933 as bishop of Saskatoon.

No.	Name	Dates	Notes
5	William Hallam	1933–1949	Bishop of Saskatchewan, 1931–1933
6	Wilfred Fuller	1949–1950	Dean of Saskatoon, 1943–1949
7	Stanley Steer	1950–1970	
8	Douglas Ford	1970–1981	Dean of Saskatoon, 1966–1970
9	Roland Wood	1981–1993	Dean of Saskatoon, 1971–1981; Dean of Athabasca, 1993–1998
10	Tom Morgan	1993–2003	Translated from Saskatchewan; Metropolitan of Rupert's Land, 2000–2003
11	Rod Andrews	2004–2010	
12	David Irving	2010–2018	
13	Chris Harper	2018–2023	National Indigenous Anglican Archbishop, 2023–present
14	Chad McCharles	Since 2025	

== Deans of Saskatoon ==
The Dean of Saskatoon is also Rector of St John's Cathedral.

- 1943–1949: William Eastland Fuller (Bishop of Saskatoon, 1949)
- 1950–1955: Norman Douglas Larmouth
- 1956–1962: Shirley Arthur Ralph Wood
- 1962–1965: Elwood Harold Patterson
- 1966–1970: Douglas Albert Ford (Bishop of Saskatoon, 1970)
- 1971–1981: Roland Wood (Bishop of Saskatoon, 1981)
- 1982–1991: Robert J. Blackwell
- 1993–2000: John Allan Kirk
- 2001–2006: Susan Marie Charbonneau
- 2006–2011: Terry R. Wiebe
- 2012–2022: G. Scott Pittendrigh
