= St. Alban's Cathedral (Prince Albert, Saskatchewan) =

Anglican cathedral in Prince Albert, Saskatchewan, Canada

Coordinates: 56.1439°N 117.1716°W

St. Alban's Cathedral, located in Prince Albert, Saskatchewan, is the Anglican cathedral of the Diocese of Saskatchewan.

The Cathedral was built in neo-gothic style in 1920 shortly after the end of World War One.
