= Diocese of Saskatchewan =

Diocese of the Anglican Church in Canada

Coordinates: 53.48°N 105.81°W

Diocese of Saskatchewan ᑭᓯᐢᑳᒋᐊᐧᐣ ᐊᔭᒥᐦᐁᐃᐧᑲᒥᐠ
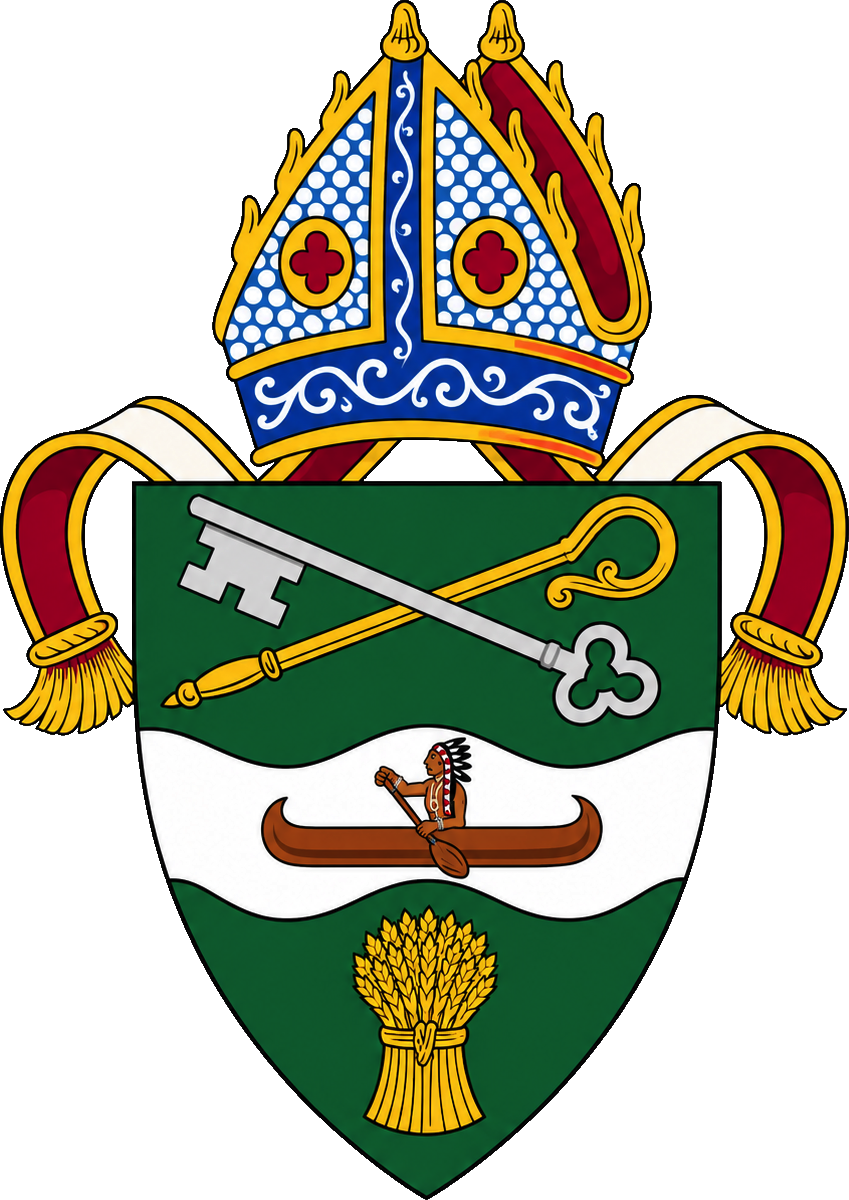

Location
- Ecclesiastical province: Northern Lights
- Archdeaconries: Saskatchewan & Prince Albert

Statistics
- Parishes: 22 (2022)
- Members: 8,417 (2022)

Information
- Rite: Anglican
- Established: 1873
- Cathedral: St Alban's Cathedral, Prince Albert

Current leadership
- Bishop: Richard Reed
- Archdeacon: Brody Albers

Map
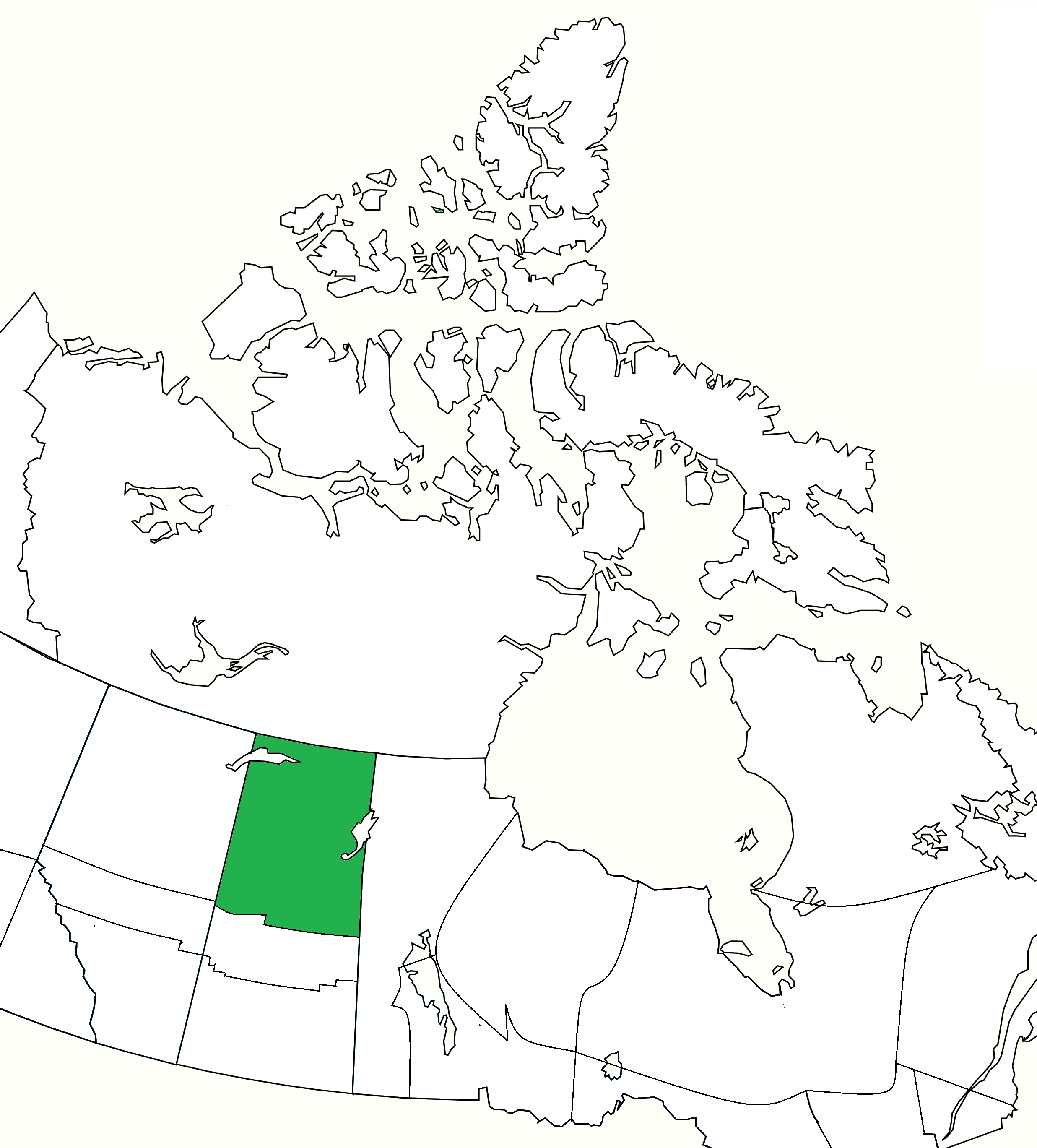
- The boundaries of the diocese within the Province of the Northern Lights

The Diocese of Saskatchewan is a diocese of the Ecclesiastical Province of the Northern Lights of the Anglican Church of Canada founded in 1874 as a missionary diocese during the westward expansion of Anglicanism in Canada's Northwest. Centered in the city of Prince Albert, Saskatchewan, it was carved out of the older Diocese of Rupert's Land during a period of rapid church expansion following the transfer of Hudson's Bay Company territories to Canada in 1869. The diocese initially encompassed most of present-day Saskatchewan and Alberta, as well as portions of northern Manitoba. The Diocese of Saskatoon was split off from it in 1933. Over time, the Diocese of Saskatchewan played a formative role in developing Indigenous Anglican ministry. Its cathedral and administrative seat is St. Alban's Cathedral in Prince Albert.

The diocese encompasses the northern two-thirds of Saskatchewan and has 32 parishes and 68 congregations. About 8,400 people are identified as Anglican on parish rolls, although attendance is much lower at less than 1,000 in 2022. In addition to the roles of diocesan bishop and indigenous bishop, there were nine paid priests and one paid deacon active in the diocese in 2022 and seven non-stipendiary priests and nine non-stipendiary deacons. The diocesan motto is ᒫᒪᐃᐧ ᐃᓯ ᒥᔮᐧᒋᒧᐃᐧᐣ mâmawi isi miywâcimowin Together in the Gospel.

== History ==
=== Foundation and early history (1820s–1880s) ===
The Church of England's missionary activity in the Canadian North-West began in the early 19th century, initially through chaplains at fur trade posts. The first permanent Anglican church was Holy Trinity at Stanley Mission, built between 1854 and 1860 by Cree craftsmen under Rev. Robert Hunt. Early Indigenous Christian leaders like Henry Budd (a Cree catechist ordained in 1853) were instrumental in laying the groundwork for Anglican ministry in what became Saskatchewan. Budd established missions at places such as The Pas (Cumberland) and Nipawin (Nepowewin) in the mid-19th century and is credited with building "solid foundations" for the church's later expansion into the northwest. By the 1860s, Anglican missionaries and Indigenous catechists were active at scattered settlements and reserves, though no local diocesan structure yet existed.

Plans to organize an Anglican diocese in the Northwest took shape after Canada acquired the territory. In 1873, the Synod of the Diocese of Rupert's Land passed an act to create a new diocese for the Saskatchewan district, with approval from the Church Missionary Society granted the year before. The Diocese of Saskatchewan was formally established in 1873 (effective 1874) to oversee missionary work among the Indigenous peoples and incoming settlers of the region. The Rev. John McLean was selected as the first Bishop of Saskatchewan; he was consecrated in England on 3 May 1874 and arrived at the mission settlement of Prince Albert in early 1875 to take up his post. At the time of its creation, the diocese was an immense jurisdiction described by McLean as "a vast area containing about 30,000 Indians, with a few small settlements of white people... no endowments, no missionaries, no churches". Bishop McLean immediately set about organizing the fledgling diocese: he established a headquarters and school west of Prince Albert and oversaw the construction of a small pro-cathedral church (St. Mary's) by 1876. In 1879 he founded Emmanuel College in Prince Albert, a theological training school primarily conceived as a center for educating Indigenous and Métis catechists and future clergy. Emmanuel College was the first post-secondary institution in the region and reflected the diocese's early priority on developing a local Native ministry.

Under Bishop McLean's leadership, the church gradually expanded its infrastructure of missions, schools, and congregations despite the challenges of vast distances and limited resources. By 1883, the diocese had grown to 22 clergy and several catechists serving both Indigenous communities and new European settlements In that year the diocese underwent its first territorial reduction: the Diocese of Assiniboia (Qu'Appelle) was erected in 1883–1884 out of the southeastern portion of McLean's territory to better serve the growing settler population in the southern prairies. Bishop McLean reluctantly accepted the loss of territory to the new Qu'Appelle diocese. He continued to administer the remaining Saskatchewan jurisdiction, which still spanned a vast area extending west into the Alberta plains and north toward the boreal forest. McLean remained bishop until his death in 1886, by which time the foundations of the diocese's structure and mission work had been firmly established.

=== Expansion and territorial changes (1880s–1930s) ===
After Bishop McLean's passing, the Diocese of Saskatchewan was led by a series of bishops who oversaw both geographical expansion and subsequent subdivision of the diocese as the Anglican Church grew in Western Canada. William Cyprian Pinkham succeeded McLean, becoming the second Bishop of Saskatchewan in 1887. In 1888, during Pinkham's tenure, the Diocese of Calgary was created out of the south-western portion of Saskatchewan diocese to minister to southern Alberta. For a time, Bishop Pinkham administered the two dioceses jointly – he was concurrently Bishop of Saskatchewan and Bishop of Calgary from 1888 onward. He moved his residence to Calgary in 1889, reflecting the growth of that region, and in 1903 he resigned his charge over Saskatchewan to serve exclusively as Calgary's diocesan bishop.

Leadership of the Diocese of Saskatchewan passed in 1903 to Jervois Arthur Newnham, formerly Bishop of Moosonee, who served in Saskatchewan until 1921. Under Newnham and his successor, George Exton Lloyd (Bishop 1922–1931), the diocese continued its missionary mandate while gradually relinquishing outlying territories as separate dioceses were formed. The northern portion of the District of Alberta remained under Saskatchewan's jurisdiction until 1914, when the Diocese of Edmonton was carved out to serve central and northern Alberta. Similarly, the far-west missions around Edmonton and Athabasca were transferred, and by 1927 Saskatchewan Diocese had given up the last of its work in Alberta. The diocese also administered some parishes in northwestern Manitoba (around The Pas and Cumberland House) in its early decades; these too were eventually ceded, with the final Manitoba portions released by 1933 (after the adjacent Diocese of Keewatin and others assumed responsibility for those areas).

Within the province of Saskatchewan, the early 20th century brought significant demographic change, including the rise of new towns and an influx of settlers to agricultural districts. The city of Saskatoon emerged as a major center, and in 1909 Emmanuel College was relocated from Prince Albert to Saskatoon, signaling that city's growing importance. Discussions about subdividing the Diocese of Saskatchewan itself began as early as the 1910s. Bishop Lloyd was a strong proponent of creating a new diocese based in Saskatoon, in order to improve administration and focus mission resources more effectively. These plans were delayed by World War I and its aftermath, but by the early 1930s – despite the Depression – the diocese resolved to go forward with reorganization. In 1932 the synod approved the formation of a separate Diocese of Saskatoon and the raising of a necessary endowment fund.

The division took effect on January 1, 1933, when the Diocese of Saskatoon was formally split off from the Diocese of Saskatchewan. This partition left the Diocese of Saskatchewan as the northern half of the province (based in Prince Albert), while the new Diocese of Saskatoon comprised the central and southern regions around the city of Saskatoon. The 1933 split was controversial within the church because it raised the question of which entity would carry the historical legacy of the original 1874 diocese. In a compromise arrangement, the new southern diocese was legally constituted as the successor to the old Diocese of Saskatchewan – it received the original diocesan charter and certain endowments and liabilities – thereby becoming, on paper, the "continuing" diocese. The northern diocese, however, retained the historic name "Saskatchewan" along with Bishop McLean's episcopal seal, the diocesan archives, and some endowed funds, emphasizing its direct descent from the missionary roots of the 19th-century diocese. A new charter was issued to the northern diocese in 1933, and an anonymous donor in England provided a fresh endowment to support its work. Both the Bishops of Saskatoon and of Saskatchewan thereafter traced their episcopal succession back to Bishop John McLean, symbolically maintaining continuity despite the organizational split. At the time of partition, Bishop W. T. Hallam (who had been Bishop of Saskatchewan in 1931–1932) became the first Bishop of Saskatoon, and Walter Burd was elected as the new Bishop of Saskatchewan in 1933 to lead the northern diocese.

=== Missionary work among Indigenous People ===
Missionary outreach to Indigenous (First Nations and Métis) communities has been a central focus of the Diocese of Saskatchewan throughout its history. From its inception, the diocese worked to develop a strong Indigenous ministry, training and ordaining local people to serve as catechists, deacons, and priests. In the 1870s Bishop McLean's founding of Emmanuel College in Prince Albert provided theological education for Indigenous and Métis students, who were prepared there to evangelize their own communities. Over the ensuing decades, many of the diocese's remote missions were staffed by Indigenous lay readers and clergy. By the early 20th century, notable figures such as ʔAhatisῑmokᵻ (James) Settee and Canon Edward Ahenakew (both Cree priests) played leadership roles within the diocese. Church reports from the 1920s note that Saskatchewan remained "primarily aboriginal" in orientation, with much of its membership and ministry in Cree and Dene communities. After 1933, the reconstituted Diocese of Saskatchewan explicitly embraced its identity as a missionary diocese to the North and to Indigenous peoples.

One distinctive aspect of the diocese's outreach was the use of itinerant and non-traditional ministry to reach widely scattered populations. In the 1920s, for example, under Bishop Lloyd's guidance, Saskatchewan pioneered programs like the Sunday School by Post (correspondence religious education) and the Sunday School Caravan Mission, which brought Christian teaching to children in remote rural and reserve communities via mail and traveling van missions. Much of this work was carried out by women missionaries – deaconesses and "Bishop's Messengers" – who served in isolated areas where there were no resident clergy. These efforts reflected the diocese's creative approach to sustaining ministry across a vast, sparsely populated territory.

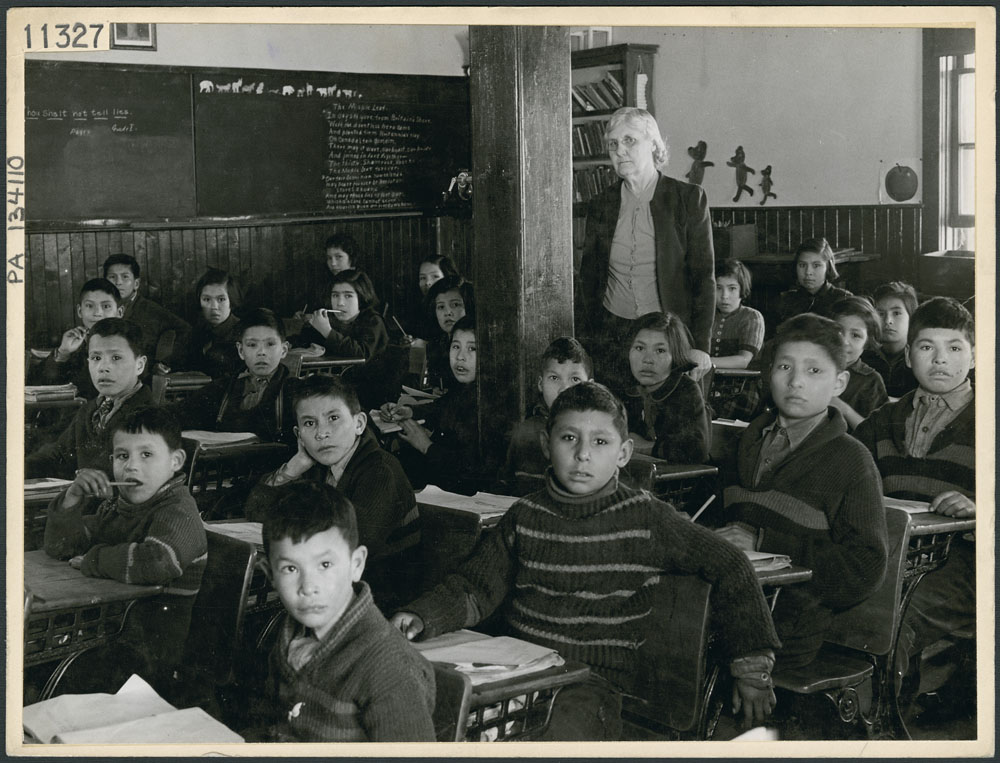
Cree students and teacher in class at All Saints Indian Residential School, (Anglican Mission School), Lac La Ronge, Saskatchewan

The Diocese of Saskatchewan was also involved in the network of Indian residential schools that operated in Canada during the late 19th and 20th centuries. Under agreements with the federal government, the Anglican Church administered a number of boarding schools for Indigenous children, and Saskatchewan's diocesan authorities oversaw several such institutions within their region. Notably, the diocese ran the St. Barnabas Indian Residential School at Onion Lake (founded 1893) and the All Saints (Lac la Ronge) Residential School (opened 1906) among others. These schools were later consolidated: for example, after All Saints School in Lac la Ronge was destroyed by fire in 1947, its students were transferred to a new Prince Albert Indian Residential School (also called All Saints) that operated from 1948 until its closure in 1969. The Anglican administration of residential schools in the diocese gradually shifted to national church bodies in the early 20th century – by 1922, direct diocesan management of certain schools had been handed over to the Missionary Society of the Church of England in Canada. All Anglican-run residential schools, including those in Saskatchewan, had ceased operation or been turned over to the federal government by the late 1960s. The diocese's historical involvement in the residential school system has been the subject of reflection and efforts at reconciliation.

In the later 20th century, the Diocese of Saskatchewan continued to affirm Indigenous leadership within the church. The diocese has been officially bilingual (Cree and English) in its liturgies and publications, and many parishes use the Cree translation of the Book of Common Prayer. In 1989, Saskatchewan became one of the first Anglican dioceses in Canada to appoint an Indigenous suffragan bishop: Charles Arthurson, a Cree priest from La Ronge, was consecrated that year to assist the diocesan bishop and to pastor the predominantly First Nations congregations. The experiment of an Indigenous bishop proved successful, and in 2012 a full-time area bishopric (the Bishop of Missinippi) was established to further serve the Cree region of northern Saskatchewan.

==== James Settee College ====
James Settee College for Ministry is an independent theological training program that prepares Indigenous clergy and lay leaders for service in the Anglican Diocese of Saskatchewan. It was founded in 1997 and named for James Settee, a 19th-century Cree catechist and missionary who helped establish Anglican missions in northern Saskatchewan. The college is the latest in a series of diocesan initiatives to develop Indigenous church leadership, following earlier efforts such as the establishment of Emmanuel College in 1879 by Bishop John McLean and a short-lived James Settee training program in the 1980s.

The College provides theological education by extension, allowing First Nations students to pursue ministry training without leaving their home communities. Its curriculum covers biblical studies, theology, ethics, church history, pastoral leadership, preaching, counselling, and youth ministry, adapted from a program developed at the Cook College & Theological School in Tempe, Arizona, to meet the needs of indigenous communities in northern Saskatchewan. Students attend week-long intensive sessions in Prince Albert three times per year and take additional weekend courses in various First Nations communities. The costs of administering the College are borne by an annual grant from the New England Company.

=== Contemporary history and mission priorities ===
In recent years the Diocese of Saskatchewan has reinforced its focus on ministry among its largely Indigenous and rural communities. In 2024 the Rev. Richard Reed was elected the 13th bishop of Saskatchewan, and he has made strengthening ties between Indigenous (primarily Cree) and non-Indigenous Anglicans a key priority. Reed notes that Cree people form the largest segment of the diocese and has spoken of the need to "recover that sense that we're one church," emphasizing relationship-building and discipleship across cultural lines. Consistent with this emphasis, the diocese continues longstanding programs to equip Indigenous leadership – for example, through theological education offered by the James Settee College. Youth and family ministry remain important as well: the diocese sponsors multiple annual youth retreats and a summer Camp Okema, engaging young people across northern Saskatchewan in Christian fellowship and formation.

==== Ecclesial identity and worship ====
The Diocese of Saskatchewan is generally regarded as one of the more theologically conservative jurisdictions within the Anglican Church of Canada. A 2001 profile in the Anglican Journal observed that "most Anglicans in the diocese [are] theologically conservative". Its official materials underscore classical Anglican doctrine and worship, for instance stating that worship "has always been primarily from the Cree and English editions of the Book of Common Prayer," which it describes as "the official standard of doctrine and worship of the Anglican Church of Canada". The diocese also publicly acknowledges its partnership with the Prayer Book Society of Canada, reflecting its commitment to traditional prayer-book liturgy. In practice this means that the 1962 Canadian Prayer Book remains normative for the sacraments and daily offices in the diocese, and the newer Book of Alternative Services (introduced nationally in 1985) is generally not adopted for ordinary parish worship.

== Bishops of Saskatchewan ==
In 1933, when the Diocese of Saskatoon was created from the Diocese of Saskatchewan, succession to both sees was ordered from John McLean, the first Bishop of Saskatchewan.

No.	Image	Name	Dates	Notes
1		John McLean	1874–1886	First Bishop of Saskatchewan, oversaw the founding of the diocese and establishment of missions and Emmanuel College. Died in office in 1886.
2		Cyprian Pinkham	1887–1903	Translated to Calgary, after which he resided in Alberta. Administered Saskatchewan in absentia until resigning the Saskatchewan see in 1903.
3		Jervois Newnham	1904–1921	Translated from Moosonee, he rejuvenated the diocese with extensive travel and advocacy. Resigned in 1921.
4		George Lloyd	1922–1931	Emphasized lay training (catechist school) and pushed for the diocese's division; resigned in 1931 to enable the creation of the Diocese of Saskatoon.
5		William Hallam	1931–1933	Fifth bishop (elect). Chosen to lead the planned Saskatoon diocese; served briefly as Bishop of Saskatchewan until the 1933 split, then became first Bishop of Saskatoon, 1933–1949
6		Walter Burd	1933–1939	Sixth Bishop of Saskatchewan (first after reorganization). Guided the diocese through the Depression and World War II, with a focus on sustaining northern missions.
7		Henry Martin	1939–1959	Oversaw post-war growth and the diocesan centennial in 1954.
8		Bill Crump	1960–1971	Oversaw the diocese during a time of gradual transition and the emergence of Indigenous lay ministry programs.
9		Vicars Short	1970–1985	Dean of Saskatchewan, 1963–1970; his tenure saw increased self-determination for the diocese and the formation of an internal Indigenous council.
10		Tom Morgan	1985–1993	Previously served as Archdeacon of Indian Missions before his election as bishop. Championed Indigenous ministry during his episcopate, overseeing the 1989 consecration of Suffragan Bishop Charles Arthurson, the first Indigenous Anglican bishop in Canada. Translated to Saskatoon; Metropolitan of Rupert's Land, 2000–2003.
11		Tony Burton	1993–2008	Dean of Saskatchewan, 1991–1993. At the time of his episcopal election Burton was the youngest bishop in the worldwide Anglican Communion and the youngest Canadian bishop of the 20th century.
12		Michael Hawkins	2009–2023	Dean of Saskatchewan, 2001–2009. As bishop he advocated healing and self-determination for Indigenous Anglicans, and was awarded an honorary Doctor of Divinity in 2009 for his contributions to the church. During his tenure Bishop Adam Halkett served as suffragan (2012–2025) for Indigenous ministry.
13		Richard Reed	Since 2024	

=== Bishops of Missinipi ===
Since 1989, the diocese has elected suffragan bishops to serve First Nations Anglicans in northern Saskatchewan, a see called the Bishopric of Missinipi.

No.	Image	Name	Dates	Notes
1		Charles Arthurson	1989–2008	Became the first Indigenous bishop in the Anglican Church of Canada upon his election as suffragan in 1989. A residential school survivor ordained in 1972, he ministered in remote Cree communities of northern Manitoba and northwestern Ontario before moving to La Ronge, SK, and was a pioneering leader of Indigenous Anglican ministry through two decades of service as Bishop of Missinipi until his retirement in 2008.
2		Adam Halkett	2012–2025	Elected as the diocese's Indigenous bishop under the Mamawi isi miywâcimowin ("Together in the Gospel") vision in 2012. As Bishop of Missinipi he oversaw over 60 predominantly Cree parishes across northern Saskatchewan – traveling to very remote communities and focusing on youth ministry, Indigenous leadership training, and pastoral care in the North.

== Deans of Saskatchewan ==
The Dean of Saskatchewan is also Rector of St Alban's Cathedral.

- ?–1963: R. Leslie Taylor
- 1963–1970: Vicars Short (Bishop of Saskatchewan, 1970)
- 1971–?: John H. McMulkin
- 1984–1990: Bruce Stavert (afterwards Bishop of Quebec, 1991)
- 1991–1993: Anthony Burton (Bishop of Saskatchewan, 1993)
- 1994–2001: Stephen Andrews (later Bishop of Algoma, 2008)
- 2001–2009: Michael Hawkins (Bishop of Saskatchewan, 2009)
- 2010–2015: Kenneth Davis
