= Cathedral of St. John the Evangelist (Saskatoon) =

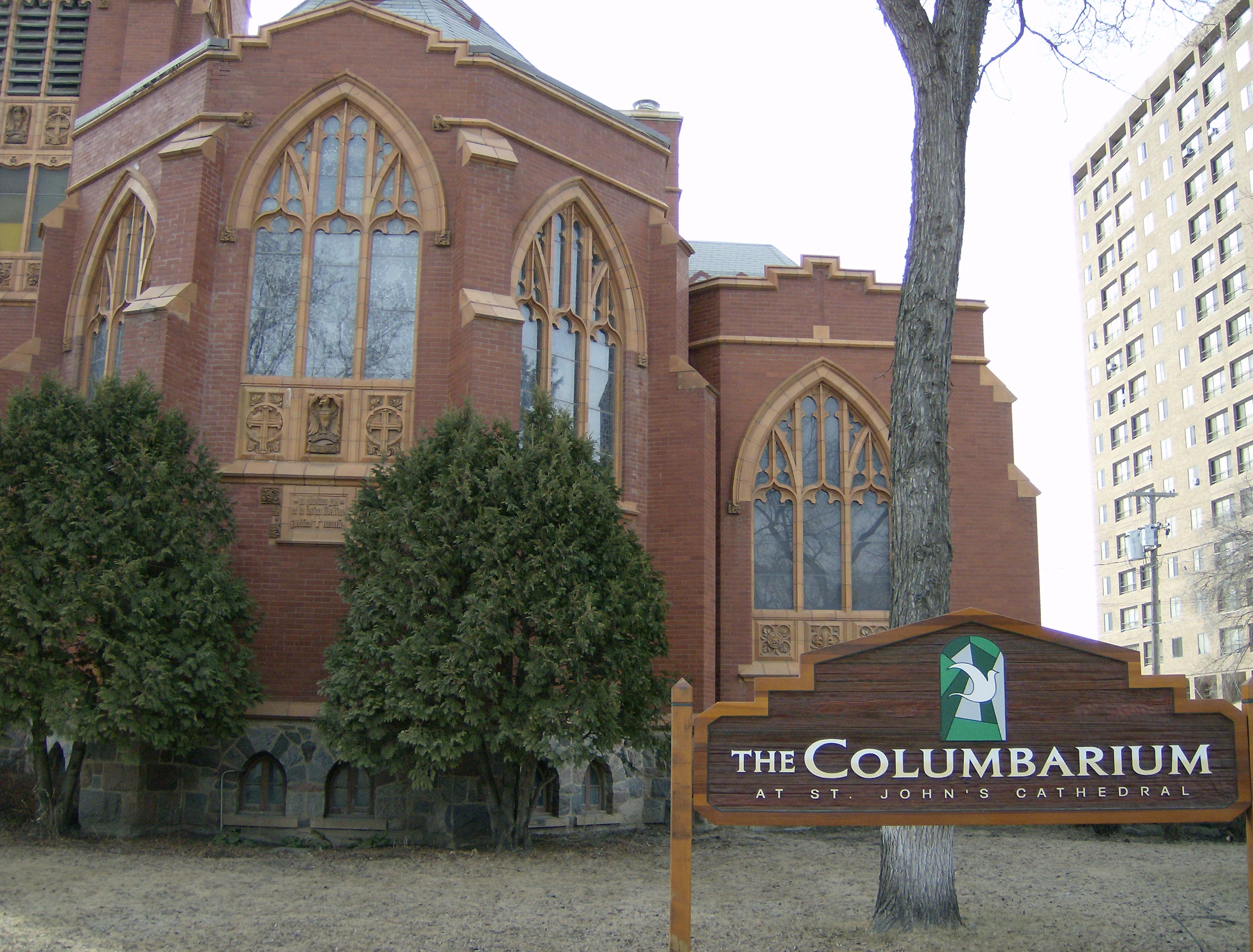
- Cathedral of St. John the Evangelist (Saskatoon)
- 52.129905°N 106.655917°W
- Location: 816 Spadina Crescent East; Saskatoon, Saskatchewan; S7K 3H4
- Country: Canada
- Denomination: Anglican
- Website: www.stjohnscathedralsaskatoon.ca

History
- Status: Cathedral
- Founded: 1902

Architecture
- Architectural type: Gothic Revival
- Groundbreaking: 1912
- Completed: 1917

Specifications
- Capacity: 500
- Length: 40 metres (130 ft)
- Width: 14 metres (46 ft)

Administration
- Province: Rupert's Land
- Diocese: Anglican Diocese of Saskatoon

Clergy
- Rector: The Rev. Dr. Laura Marie Piotrowicz

The Cathedral of St. John the Evangelist, located at 816 Spadina Crescent East in the Central Business District neighbourhood of Saskatoon, Saskatchewan, Canada is the cathedral of the Anglican Diocese of Saskatoon.

== History ==
Although Saskatoon was founded in 1883, St. John's, its first Anglican parish, was not established until 1902 owing to the substantially Methodist and to a lesser extent Presbyterian character of the early settlement, it having been founded as a temperance colony. The first St. John's church, a wooden frame building, was erected in 1903. The present building used was built from 1912 to 17.

St. John's was designated a pro-cathedral in 1924 while Saskatoon remained part of the Anglican Diocese of Saskatchewan with its cathedral in Prince Albert. In 1932 the Diocese of Saskatoon was created and St. John's became its cathedral. The cathedral had only a small reed organ and piano by way of musical instruments until 1956 when a three-manual Hill, Norman and Beard organ was built; it was replaced by a two-manual Casavant Frères organ in 1981-1982.

== Architecture ==
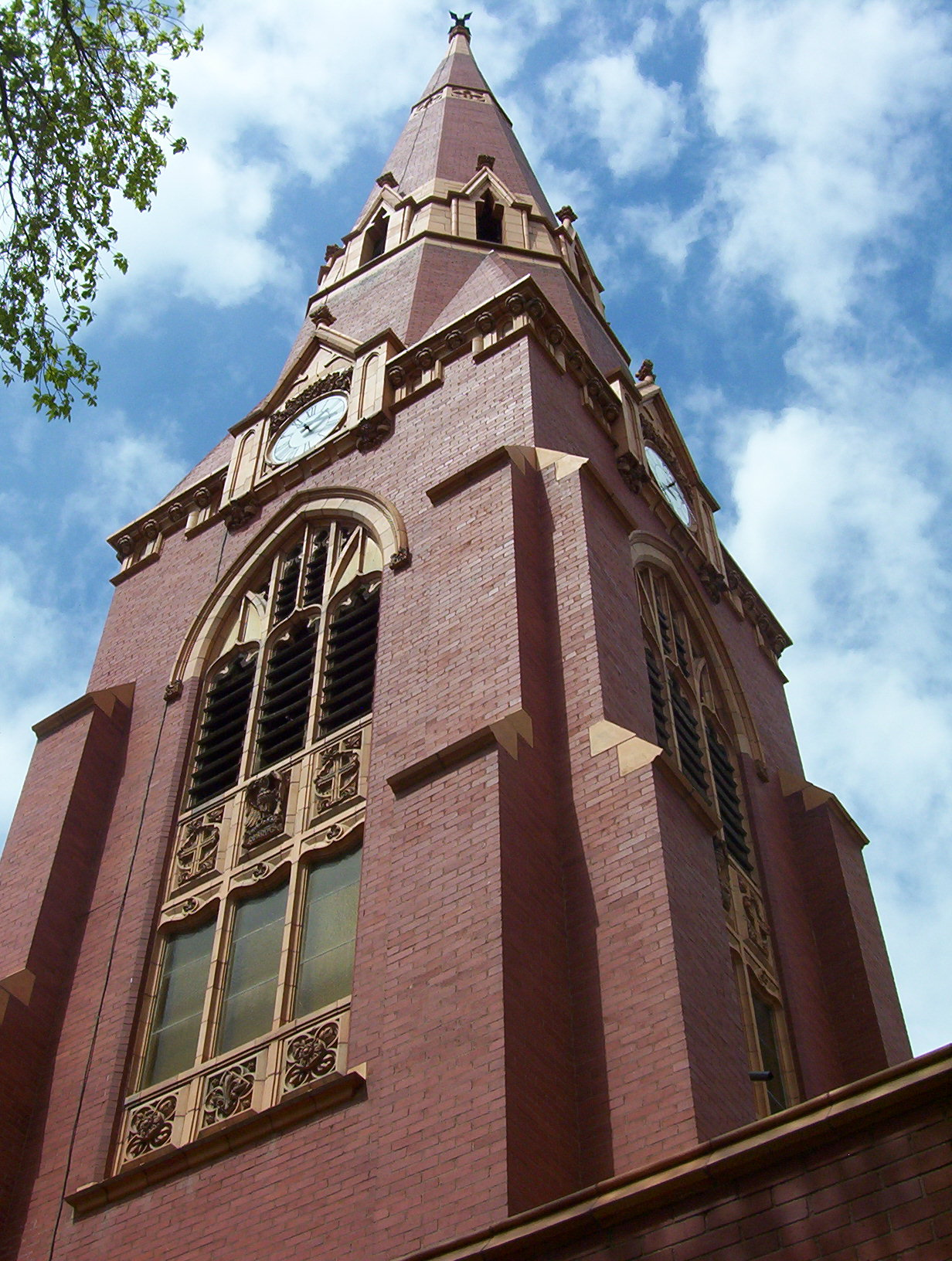
The brick used to build the church is made of Tyndall stone and terra cotta

The present brick, Tyndall stone and terra cotta structure was raised in an unornamented neo-Gothic style. Its chief distinguishing characteristic is a rood screen at the chancel steps. The rood screen, pulpit, lectern, and high altar are made of Carrara ware (Doulton white terra cotta resembling Italian Carrera marble). The cornerstone was laid in 1912 by the Governor General of Canada, Prince Arthur, Duke of Connaught. The building's foundation is made of fieldstone (which includes granite, gabbro, diorite, gneiss, schist, and dolomite).

The nave is 40×14m in size; it together with the transepts originally sat 1100. The seating capacity has been reduced to 800 with the removal of pews at the liturgical west end and to accommodate a nave altar at the crossing. Queen Elizabeth II and the Duke of Edinburgh have worshipped at St. John's three times (1951, 1959, 1987), and Governor General Viscount Alexander worshipped there in 1948. The Institute for stained glass in Canada has documented the stained glass at St John's Anglican Cathedral

== See also ==
- The Canadian Crown in Saskatoon
- Monarchy in Saskatchewan
