= Cyrus Pitman =

Cyrus Clement James Pitman (born March 24, 1944) is the former Bishop of Eastern Newfoundland and Labrador.

Pitman was educated at the Memorial University of Newfoundland. Ordained in 1967, he served at Channel, Flower's Cove, Petty Harbour, and Conception Bay South before becoming Archdeacon of Avalon in 2002.

He was appointed as new Bishop of Eastern Newfoundland and Labrador in 2004, succeeding Don Harvey; he retired in November 2013.

In 2023 he relinquished his positions in the Anglican Church of Canada and joined the Anglican Network in Canada (ANiC), which is an Anglican realignment diocese of the Anglican Church in North America (ACNA), where Pitman is working in the homelessness ministry of the Anglican Church of the Good Samaritan. According to news reports, the decision came as a surprise to Newfoundland Anglicans, since Pitman had been well known for his liberal positions in the past, such as supporting same-sex marriage.

== Notes ==
Religious titles
| Preceded by Donald Frederick Harvey | Bishop of Eastern Newfoundland and Labrador; 2004 –2013 | Succeeded by Geoff Peddle |
