= David Short (priest) =

Australian-Canadian Anglican priest

The Reverend Canon David Short
- Rector of St. John's Vancouver
- Church: Anglican Church of Australia (before 1991); Anglican Church of Canada (1991–2008); Anglican Church in North America (since 2009)

Personal details
- Denomination: Anglican
- Residence: Vancouver, British Columbia
- Parents: Ken Short
- Spouse: Bronwyn
- Children: 2
- Occupation: Priest
- Education: Moore Theological College; Regent College

David Short is an Australian-Canadian Anglican priest. As rector of St. John's Shaughnessy and later St. John's Vancouver, he was a key figure in the Anglican realignment in Canada.

== Early life, education and ordained ministry ==
Short was born to Australians Ken and Gloria Short in Tanganyika, later Tanzania. Ken Short—a future bishop in the Anglican Diocese of Sydney—was serving in Tanganyika as a Church Mission Society missionary. He grew up in Sydney and attended Moore Theological College, later being ordained in the Diocese of Sydney. He served at St. Matthew's Anglican Church, Manly; Christ Church, Gladesville, St. Mark's Anglican Church, Yagoona; St Michael's Cathedral, Wollongong; and in Diocese of Sydney's Department of Evangelism.

In 1991, Short, his wife, Bronwyn, and their two sons moved to Vancouver for him to pursue a master's degree at Regent College under J. I. Packer. At the conclusion of his studies in 1992, Short was chosen to succeed evangelical priest Harry Robinson as rector of St. John's Shaughnessy, a large and prominent church in the Anglican Diocese of New Westminster. In 1998, Short launched Artizo, a training program for priests that has graduated over 150 clergy. The church also developed educational resources for children's ministry used by more than 145 other churches.

== Anglican realignment ==
As debates about same-sex blessings surfaced in the late 1990s and early 2000s, Short opposed the adoption of same-sex blessings rites in the Diocese of New Westminster and floated the idea of alternative episcopal oversight as had been introduced in the Church of England with the ordination of women. In 2002, the New Westminster synod controversially approved the blessing of same-sex unions. Packer, Short, and other delegates from St. John's, along with delegates from seven other churches, walked out of the synod in objection. The dissenting churches formed a group called the Anglican Communion in New Westminster (ACiNW) and declared impaired communion with Bishop Michael Ingham. Short and the other clergy walking out faced canonical charges from Ingham.

The synod decision became a major flashpoint in the Anglican realignment. After the failure of the ACiNW churches to obtain alternative episcopal oversight from within the Anglican Church of Canada, in February 2008 St. John's membership voted with 96 percent in favor to disaffiliate from the Anglican Church of Canada and become canonically resident in the Anglican Church of the Southern Cone. The Southern Cone agreed to provide primatial oversight for traditionalist Anglican churches in Canada as an interim step to creating an eventual parallel province in North America.

In April 2008, Short, Packer and St. John's vicar Dan Gifford formally relinquished their ministry in the Anglican Church of Canada and join the Anglican Network in Canada (ANiC). "It's been so heartbreaking that we have to do this," Short told the Vancouver Sun. "We are not trying to harm the Anglican Church of Canada." Short and fellow priest Trevor Walters became leaders of the nascent ANiC. In June 2009, Short was present at the formation of the Anglican Church in North America.

The church was involved in litigation over the ownership of its CA$13 million property; the Supreme Court of British Columbia (a trial court jurisdiction) in 2009 affirmed that the property belonged to the Diocese of New Westminster. The higher B.C. Court of Appeal affirmed the ruling, and the Supreme Court of Canada declined to hear the case, resulting in all of the clergy and the bulk of the congregation leaving the Shaughnessy building on September 18, 2011. Short relaunched the church as St. John's Vancouver with about 700 members in rented facilities.

== Other activities ==
Short has co-written a book on pastoral visitation and co-edited a book on the history of ANiC. In May 2025, Short retired as rector of St. John's in conjunction with the congregation's centennial.

== Personal life ==
David and Bronwyn Short live in Vancouver. After the litigation concluded—which resulted in his family being evicted from the church's rectory—Short experienced a physical breakdown that necessitated a yearlong medical leave.

== Bibliography ==
- Short, David; Searle, David (2015). Pastoral Visitation: A Pocket Manual. Tain, Ross-shire: Christian Focus. ISBN 9781845500160.
- Egerton, George; MacKenney, Kyle; Short, David; Walters, Trevor, eds. (2021). The Anglican Network in Canada: Protest, Providence, and Promise in Global Anglican Realignment. Huntington Beach, California: Anglican House Publishers. ISBN 9781734618044.
