= Geoff Peddle =

Canadian Anglican prelate (1963–2020)

The Right Reverend Geoff Peddle
- Bishop of Eastern Newfoundland and Labrador
- Church: Anglican Church of Canada
- Diocese: Diocese of Eastern Newfoundland and Labrador
- In office: 2014–2020
- Predecessor: Cyrus Clement James Pitman
- Successor: Samuel Rose

Orders
- Ordination: 1987 by Martin Mate
- Consecration: 2014 by Claude Miller

Personal details
- Born: 1 January 1963 Bonavista, Newfoundland and Labrador
- Died: 8 October 2020 (aged 57)

Geoffrey Curtis Ralph Peddle (1 January 1963 – 8 October 2020) was the bishop of the Diocese of Eastern Newfoundland and Labrador from 2014 to 2020.

== Early life and family ==
Peddle was born in Bonavista and grew up in Trinity, Lethbridge and Whitbourne. He held a BA and an MA degree from Memorial University, an M.Div. degree from Queen's College, and a Ph.D. degree from Cardiff University. He and his wife, Kathy, made their home in Mount Pearl near St. John's. They have two sons. He was the brother of the former Chaplain General of Canada, Brigadier General (Ret.) Gerald Peddle.

== Anglican Church of Canada ==
Peddle was ordained in 1987. He served in the Parish of Lake Melville, the Parish of Arnold's Cove, the Parish of the Ascension and the Parish of the Good Shepherd, both located in Mount Pearl. He also served as Diocesan Executive Officer for the Diocese of Eastern Newfoundland and Labrador 2005-2009 and as Provost, Chancellor and Vice-Chancellor of Queen's College, the Newfoundland and Labrador theological college. He was the author of various academic articles and books, notably, From Mount Pearl to Mount Sinai, The Atonement of Jack Fowler, The Church Lads' Brigade in Newfoundland: A People's Story Church Lads' Brigade and The Church of England Orphanage in Newfoundland: 1855–1969.

Peddle died on 8 October 2020.

Religious titles
Preceded by Cyrus Clement James Pitman	Bishop of Eastern Newfoundland and Labrador; 2014–2020	Succeeded by Samuel Rose
