= Stephen Leung =

Canadian Anglican bishop

The Right Reverend Stephen Leung D.D.
- Suffragan Bishop of the Anglican Diocese of Canada
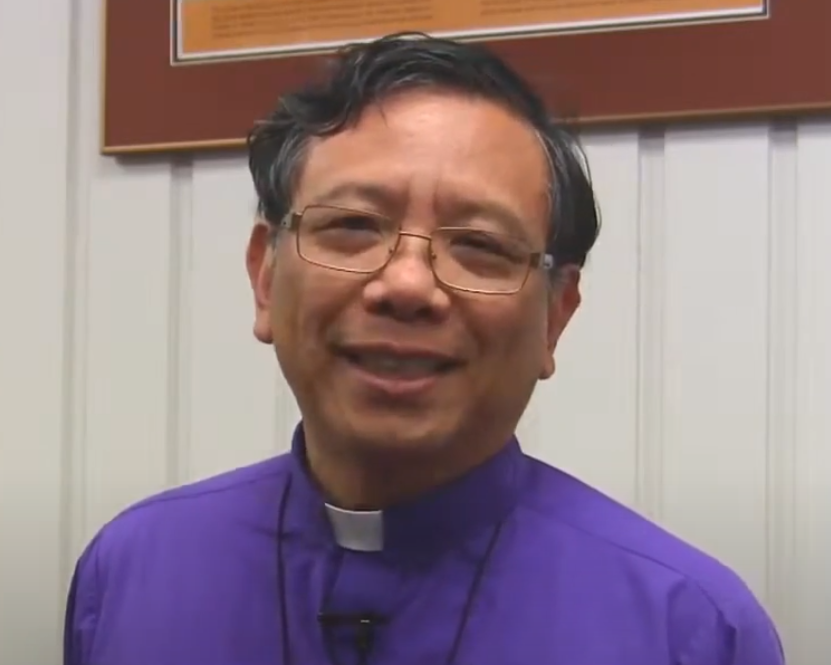
- Church: Anglican Church in North America
- Diocese: Canada
- In office: 2009–present
- Other posts: Area Bishop, Asian and Multicultural Ministries in Canada; Rector, Church of the Good Shepherd

Orders
- Ordination: 1979
- Consecration: November 13, 2009 by Don Harvey

Stephen Wing Hong Leung (Chinese: 梁永康主教) is a Canadian bishop. Since 2009, he has served as suffragan bishop with responsibility for Asian and multicultural ministry in the Anglican Diocese of Canada, a diocese of the Anglican Church in North America formerly known as the Anglican Network in Canada (ANiC).

== Biography ==
Leung studied at Wycliffe College in Toronto, after which he was ordained in Hong Kong Sheng Kung Hui. He served as a curate in Hong Kong and then for several years as a pastor in Macau. In 1990, he was called as rector of the Anglican Church of the Good Shepherd, a predominantly ethnic Chinese congregation in the Diocese of New Westminster in Vancouver.

In 2002, after the New Westminster synod controversially approved the blessing of same-sex unions, Leung joined the Good Shepherd delegates, along with delegates from seven other churches, in walking out of synod in objection. Leung and the other dissenting leaders formed a group called the Anglican Communion in New Westminster, declared impaired communion with Bishop Michael Ingham, and requested alternative episcopal oversight—including, eventually, requests for oversight from Global South Anglican primates.

As the Anglican realignment proceeded in Canada, Church of the Good Shepherd voted unanimously to disaffiliate from New Westminster in February 2008. Good Shepherd sought oversight from the Anglican Church of the Southern Cone and joined ANiC. The church was involved in litigation over the ownership of its property; the Supreme Court of British Columbia (a trial court jurisdiction) in 2009 affirmed that the property belonged to the diocese, but the judge awarded a $2.2 million bequest to the local congregation, finding that "Dr. [Daphne Wai-Chun] Chun intended the proceeds [of the bequest] to be applied to the building needs of the parish that served the Chinese community. That parish voted unanimously to receive Episcopal oversight from the Province of the Southern Cone and to affiliate with ANiC. In the circumstances, I conclude that a scheme whereby the funds are held on trust for the building needs of the ANiC congregation will best fulfil Dr. Chun’s charitable intent." The higher B.C. Court of Appeal affirmed the ruling, and the Supreme Court of Canada declined to hear the case, resulting in Good Shepherd leaving its prior building.

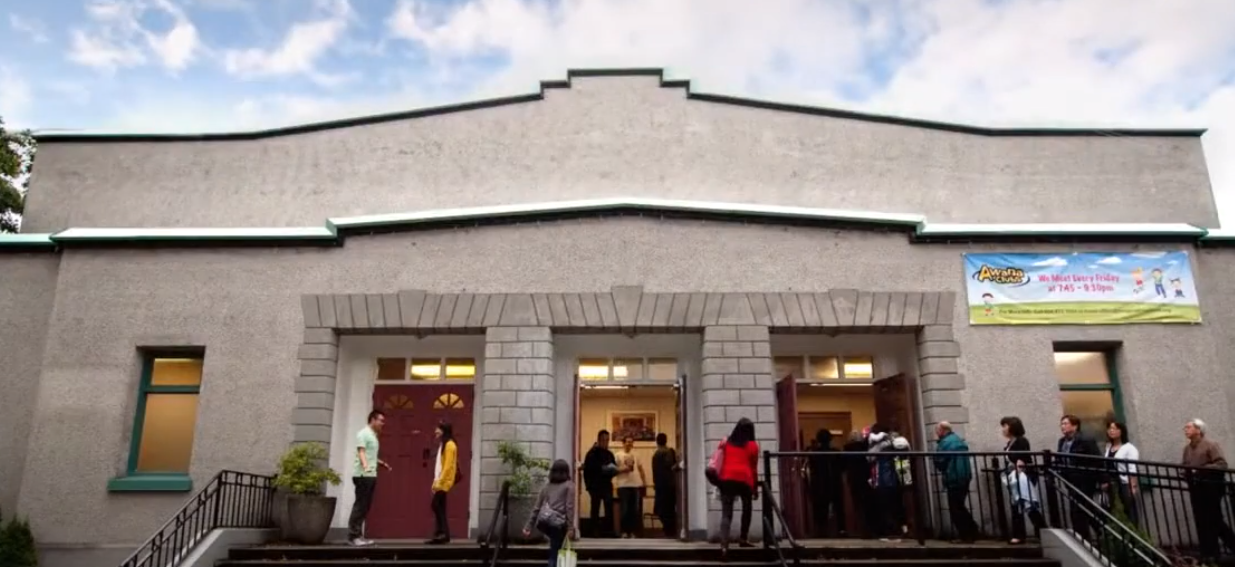
Leung's church, the Anglican Network Church of the Good Shepherd in Vancouver.

On November 13, 2009, Leung was consecrated a bishop for ANiC in St. Catharines, Ontario, alongside Charlie Masters and Trevor Walters. He continues to serve as rector of Good Shepherd and is responsible for Asian and Multicultural Ministries in Canada, ANiC's multicultural outreach arm. He also represents the ACNA in relations with Asian provinces of the Anglican Communion and GAFCON, attending for example the installation of Datuk Ng Moon Hing as primate of the Church of the Province of South East Asia.

== Personal life ==
Leung is married to Nona. They had two daughters; in 2018, their younger daughter died unexpectedly in Edmonton.

Leung received an honorary doctorate from Wycliffe College in May 2021.
