= Philip Abraham =

Canadian Anglican bishop (1897–1955)

Abraham in c1937.

Philip Selwyn Abraham (29 July 1897 – 22 December 1955) was the Anglican Bishop of Newfoundland in Canada from 1942 until his death in 1955.

Born in Lichfield on 29 July 1897, he was educated at Eton College and New College, Oxford. After World War I service with the Royal Artillery he was ordained in 1923 and was a curate at Daybrook and St Mary Redcliffe, Bristol. Subsequently, he became the Precentor of Christ Church Cathedral, Montreal, then Vicar of Romford. He was consecrated as Coadjutor Bishop of Newfoundland on 1 August 1937 in Lambeth Palace Chapel and arrived in St. John's on 9 September. In 1942 he became the diocesan bishop. His father and grandfather were also bishops.

Church of England titles
Preceded by William White	Bishop of Newfoundland; 1942–1955	Succeeded by John Alfred Meaden
