= Mike Stewart (bishop) =

Canadian Anglican bishop (born 1965)

The Right Reverend Mike Stewart
- Suffragan Bishop of the Anglican Diocese of Canada
- Church: Anglican Church in North America
- Diocese: Canada
- In office: 2024–present
- Previous posts: Rector, St. Matthew's Anglican Church, Abbotsford, British Columbia; Archdeacon for the Fraser Valley

Orders
- Ordination: 1989 (diaconate); 1990 (priesthood)
- Consecration: March 23, 2024 by Foley Beach

Personal details
- Born: 1965 (age 60–61)
- Education: St John's College, Nottingham

Michael Stewart (born 1965) is a British-born Canadian Anglican bishop. He was consecrated in 2024 as bishop suffragan of the Anglican Diocese of Canada in the Anglican Church in North America, where he serves as area bishop for western Canada. He was previously in parish ministry in Abbotsford, British Columbia, where he participated in the Anglican realignment in the 2000s.

== Biography ==
Stewart is a native of the United Kingdom. He studied for the priesthood at St John's College, Nottingham, and was ordained as a deacon in 1989 and a priest in 1990. He began his ordained ministry as curate at St. Paul's Church, Ealing, and then as vicar at St. Cuthbert's, North Wembley, for nine years. In 2002, Stewart and his family immigrated to British Columbia, where he became an associate priest at St. Matthew's Anglican Church in Abbotsford. Stewart is married to Marianne and they have five children.

Around the time of Stewart's arrival in Canada, St. Matthew's delegates, along with delegates from eight other churches in the Anglican Diocese of New Westminster, walked out of the diocesan synod and asked for alternative episcopal oversight in objection to the synod's approval of same-sex blessings. After the synod, a group of clergy dissenting from the synod's decision sought alternative episcopal oversight. After efforts to establish alternative oversight failed, in May 2008, Stewart and other clergy relinquished their orders in the Anglican Church of Canada, and St. Matthew's sought oversight from the Southern Cone and joined the newly formed ANiC. The church was involved in litigation over the ownership of its property; the Supreme Court of British Columbia (a trial court jurisdiction) in 2009 affirmed that the property belonged to the Diocese of New Westminster. The higher B.C. Court of Appeal affirmed the ruling, and the Supreme Court of Canada declined to hear the case, resulting in St. Matthew's leaving its prior building.

After Trevor Walters was elected to serve as ANiC suffragan bishop for western Canada, Stewart succeeded him as rector of St. Matthew's. Stewart also served as archdeacon for the Fraser Valley area. In 2021, Stewart was one of two finalists in the election for ANiC diocesan bishop; Dan Gifford was elected. Stewart was elected bishop suffragan in ANiC's 2023 election, and he was consecrated by Foley Beach in Abbotsford on March 23, 2024.

== Bibliography ==
- Stewart, Mike (2007). No Crowds Present: Reflections on Contemplation and Divine Friendship. Abbotsford, British Columbia: Fresh Wind Press. ISBN 9780978017460.
- Stewart, Mike (2009). Taking Prayer Seriously (PDF). Burlington, Ontario: Anglican Network in Canada. ISBN 978-1-897538-06-7.
- Stewart, Michael (2020). In His Time. Huntington Beach, California: Anglican House Publishers. ISBN 9781732344853.
