= Ellen Rosalie Simon =

Canadian artist (1916-2011)

Ellen R. Simon
- Born: Ellen Rosalie Simon; April 15, 1916; Toronto, Ontario
- Died: November 19, 2011 (aged 95); Amesbury, Massachusetts, U.S.
- Education: Ontario College of Art, Toronto where she studied with Yvonne McKague Housser, Franklin Carmichael, and Gustave and Emmanuel Hahn), the Art Students League of New York; the New School for Social Research, Toronto; and the Bank Street School Writers Laboratory, Ottawa.

Ellen Rosalie Simon (April 15, 1916 – November 19, 2011) was a Canadian stained-glass artist, illustrator and printmaker.

== Biography ==
Ellen Simon was born in Toronto and studied art at the Ontario College of Art, Toronto with Yvonne McKague Housser, among others; the Art Students League of New York (1936-1940); and the New School for Social Research in Toronto. She studied stained-glass by apprenticing with Yvonne Williams in Toronto and with the Joep Nicolas Studio in the Netherlands.

She was a modern artist who sought to convey political and social issues through her graphics and book or magazine illustrations. In 1937, she made lithographs such as Men (National Gallery of Canada), reproduced in the New Frontier magazine, a monthly Toronto magazine of literature and social criticism (1936-1937) begun in the Depression.

Her major work was as a creator of stained-glass windows for churches, synagogues, and universities. For almost 40 years she was a colleague of Yvonne Williams and worked in her Toronto studio on commissions in Canada and the U.S.A. Among the churches for which she created the stained glass, along with Yvonne Williams and Rosemary Kilbourne is St. Michael & All Angels Church in Toronto. Her graphics are in the collection of the Art Gallery of Ontario and the National Gallery of Canada. Ellen Simon taught at Riverside Church, New York, from 1965 on.

Ellen Simon died on November 19, 2011, in Amesbury, Massachusetts.
