= Dan Gifford =

American-born Canadian Anglican bishop (born 1962)

The Right Reverend Dan Gifford
- Bishop of the Anglican Diocese of Canada
- Church: Anglican Church in North America
- Diocese: Canada
- In office: 2022–present
- Predecessor: Charlie Masters
- Previous posts: Vicar, St. John's Vancouver; Archdeacon for Vancouver, ANiC

Orders
- Ordination: 1991 (priesthood)
- Consecration: 6 February 2022 by Foley Beach

Personal details
- Born: Daniel Christian Gifford; December 1962 (age 63)

Daniel Christian Gifford (born 1962) is an American-born Canadian bishop of the Anglican Church in North America. In February 2022, he was consecrated as coadjutor bishop of the Anglican Network in Canada (renamed since 2024 as the Anglican Diocese of Canada) and succeeded Charlie Masters as diocesan bishop in November 2022. He was previously archdeacon for the Vancouver area in ANiC and vicar of St. John's Vancouver.

== Early life, education, and early ministry ==
Gifford grew up in the Minneapolis area and was raised in a Christian home. He studied theology at St. John's College in Nottingham, England earned his M.Div. from Wycliffe College in Toronto in 1990, and was ordained to the priesthood in the Anglican Church of Canada in 1991. He served a two-year curacy on British Columbia's Sunshine Coast and was then appointed rector of St. Andrew's Anglican Church, Pender Harbour, where he served for six years.

In 1998, Gifford joined the staff of St. John's Shaughnessy in Vancouver, then the largest Anglican church in Canada, under long-serving rector David Short. At St. John's, Gifford met his future wife, Cathryn; they married in 2001 and have two teenage sons.

== Leadership roles ==
Gifford's role as vicar at St. John's included responsibility for discipleship, catechesis, evangelism, cross-cultural mission, and preaching. He served at St. John's throughout the congregation's departure from the Diocese of New Westminster during the Anglican realignment and its subsequent loss in its legal bid to retain its property and the rebranding as St. John's Vancouver. In 2002, Gifford was one of St. John's delegates at the New Westminster diocesan synod. After the synod controversially approved the blessing of same-sex unions, Gifford joined the St. John's delegates, along with delegates from eight other churches, in walking out of synod and asking for alternative episcopal oversight.

Following the establishment of ANiC, Gifford also served as archdeacon for metro Vancouver, as a member of the ANiC finance committee, and on the ANiC Council.

In November 2021, Gifford was elected coadjutor bishop of ANiC on the third ballot. ACNA Archbishop Foley Beach consecrated him as a bishop on 6 February 2022 at the Church of the Good Shepherd in Vancouver. He succeeded Masters as diocesan bishop at ANiC's synod on 2 November 2022. In addition to serving as coadjutor bishop, he also served as area bishop for congregations in western Canada. In the summer of 2022, Gifford announced that ANiC will elect a suffragan bishop to care for congregations in eastern Canada, succeeding Masters, in fall 2023, which resulted in the election of Mike Stewart.

Religious titles
Preceded by Charlie Masters	Bishop of the Anglican Diocese of Canada; 2022–present	Incumbent
