= Bishop White =

Bishop White may refer to:

- Alma Bridwell White (1862–1946), Bishop of the Pillar of Fire Church
- Arthur Kent White (1889–1981), Bishop of the Pillar of Fire Church
- William White (Bishop of Pennsylvania) (1748-1836), Episcopal bishop and United States Senate Chaplain
- William White (Bishop of Newfoundland) (1865-1943), Anglican bishop in Canada
- William White (Bishop of Honan) (1873-1960), Anglican bishop in China
