= Charlie Masters =

Canadian bishop (born 1951)

The Right Reverend Charlie Masters
- Moderator Bishop of the Anglican Network in Canada
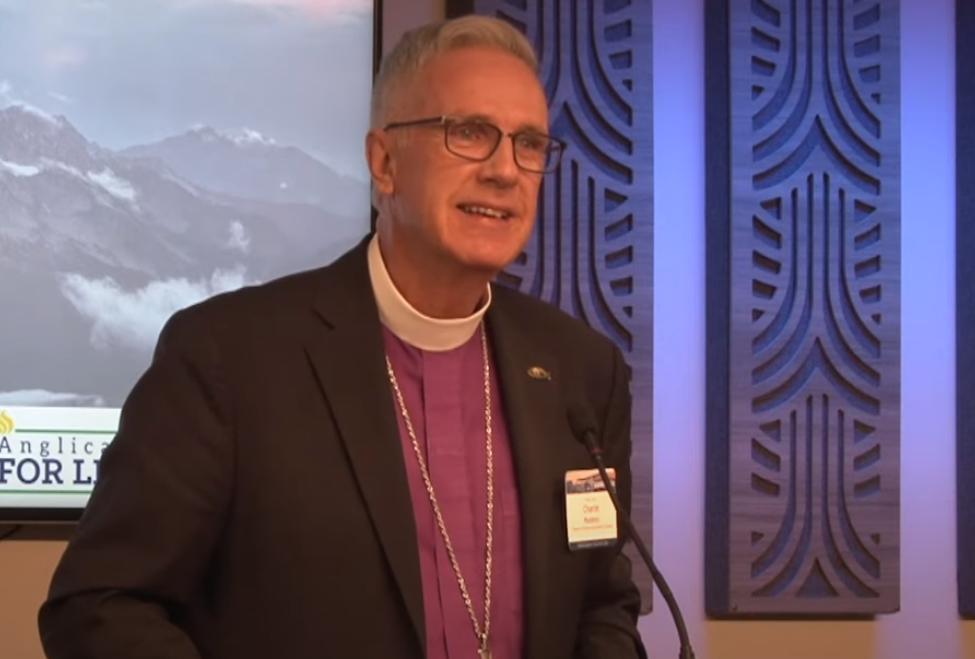
- Masters speaks at a 2020 Anglicans for Life event
- Church: Anglican Church in North America
- Diocese: Canada
- In office: 2014–2022
- Predecessor: Don Harvey
- Successor: Dan Gifford
- Other post(s): Area Bishop for Ontario and East Canada

Orders
- Ordination: 1979
- Consecration: 2009 by Don Harvey

Personal details
- Born: 1951 (age 73–74)

Charles Frederick Masters (born 1951) is a Canadian bishop. He served from 2014 to 2022 as moderator bishop of the Anglican Network in Canada within the Anglican Church in North America.

He was reared at Lennoxville, Quebec, and Guelph, Ontario, in a devout Anglican family. He graduated from the University of Guelph in 1972, where he found his religious calling. After his graduation, he worked for a Christian camp ministry, the Navigators, at the University of British Columbia in Vancouver.

Masters moved to England with his wife in 1975 to study for ordained ministry at St John's College in Nottingham. He was ordained an Anglican deacon in 1978 and a priest in 1979 in the Anglican Church of Canada. He served afterwards as the rector of St. George's Lowville, in the Anglican Diocese of Niagara, until June 1, 2008.

Concerned about the theological liberalism of the Anglican Church of Canada, Masters and his congregation joined the Anglican Network in Canada (ANiC) in February 2008. In June 2008, he became archdeacon and national director in ANiC, which was a founding body of the Anglican Church in North America one year later. He attended the Global Anglican Future Conference in Jerusalem, also in June 2008.

Masters was consecrated Area Bishop for Ontario and East Canada at St. Catherine's Church, Ontario, on November 13, 2009, alongside Trevor Walters and Stephen Leung. He was elected at the ANiC synod, held at St. Peter & St. Paul's Anglican Church, in Ottawa, on November 14, 2012 as a co-adjutor bishop to succeed Don Harvey as the moderator bishop on Harvey's retirement in 2014. Masters enthronement took place at St. Peter & St. Paul's Anglican Church in Ottawa at the ANiC annual synod on November 6, 2014, by Archbishop Foley Beach.

Masters is the founding chancellor of Packer College, ANiC's official diocesan seminary, located at the Anglican Church of the Good Samaritan in St. John's.

Masters retired as diocesan bishop of ANiC in November 2022 and was succeeded by co-adjutor bishop Dan Gifford.

Masters is married and has two adult children.

Anglican Communion titles
Preceded by Donald Harvey	II Moderator Bishop of the Anglican Network in Canada; 2014–2022	Succeeded by Dan Gifford
