= St. John's Shaughnessy =

Anglican church in Vancouver, British Columbia, Canada

- St. John's (Shaughnessy) Memorial Church
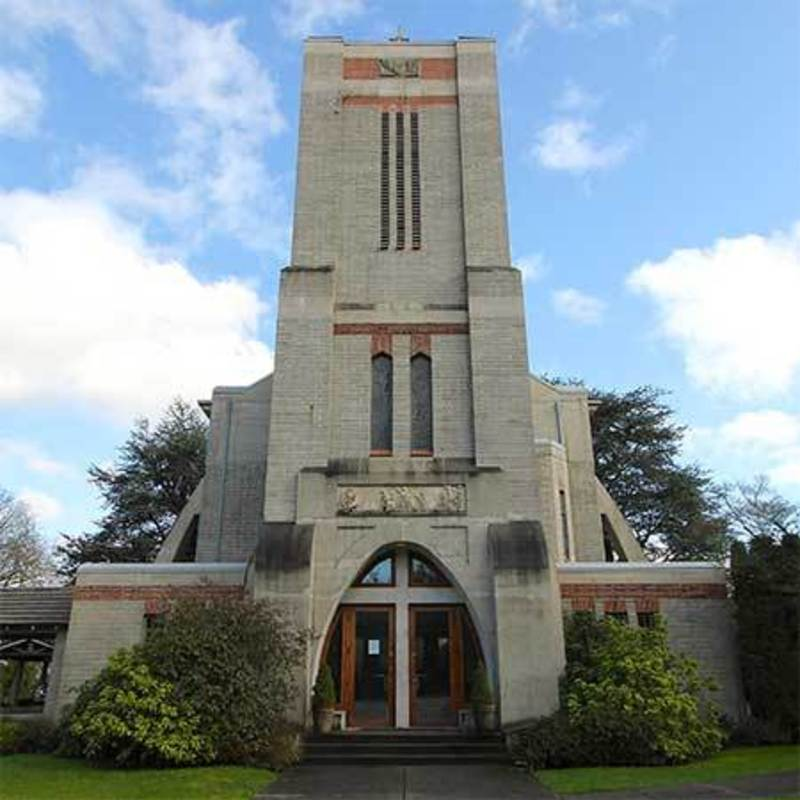
- View of the west front and tower of St. John's.
- St. John's Shaughnessy
- 49°14′50″N 123°08′18″W
- Location: Vancouver, British Columbia
- Country: Canada
- Denomination: Anglican Church of Canada
- Website: www.stjohnsshaughnessy.org

History
- Founded: 1925
- Founder: Adam de Pencier
- Dedicated: 1950

Architecture
- Architect: G. L. Thornton Sharp
- Style: Art Deco
- Years built: 1949–1950

Administration
- Diocese: New Westminster

Clergy
- Rector: The Rev. Terry Shields Dirbas

St. John's (Shaughnessy) Memorial Church (known colloquially as "St. John's Shaughnessy") is an Anglican parish in the Shaughnessy neighborhood of Vancouver. Founded in 1925, the church is part of the Diocese of New Westminster in the Anglican Church of Canada. Once reported to be the largest Anglican church in Canada and a bastion of evangelicalism, most of the congregation and clergy left during the Anglican realignment and the church is today much smaller and aligned with the progressive wing of Canadian Anglicanism.

== History ==
=== Early history ===
The site where St. John's stands today was originally the site of the residence of the bishop of New Westminster, built by Adam de Pencier in 1910. In 1924, de Pencier's wife began teaching an evangelistic Sunday school in her kitchen. It grew substantially, and the de Penciers added a chapel in the basement of the residence. When the chapel was itself outgrown, de Pencier authorized the building of a wood-frame church on the property at the corner of Granville Street and Nanton Avenue in 1925.

The Rev. Norman Larmonth was called as rector in 1941. Strongly opposed to church debt, he drove down St. John's $4,400 debt and began a fundraising campaign to build a larger church capable of seating 500 on the Shaughnessy site. It was designed in a late Art Deco style by prominent Vancouver architect George Lister Thornton Sharp, whose other works included the Victory Square monument and the Burrard Street Bridge. The church was built as a war memorial church “that it be a joyful song unto the Lord; and that it stand as a memorial honouring all Vancouver’s sons and daughters who answer the call to serve their country.” Two hundred thousand dollars was raised from the parish and from across lower mainland B.C. for the project. In 1949, construction began on the present church; it was dedicated on June 18, 1950.

=== Transition to evangelicalism ===
After the dedication, Larmonth moved to Saskatoon to take up the deanship of St. John's Cathedral. In the mid-20th century, St. John's became known for high-church Anglo-Catholic liturgies. By the 1970s, however, St. John's membership had significantly declined and the church's finances were deteriorating. The vestry called the Rev. Harry Robinson, rector of Little Trinity Anglican Church in Toronto, as rector in 1978. Robinson was a prominent low-church evangelical within the Anglican Church of Canada; during his theological studies in England, he had befriended notable evangelicals like John R. W. Stott, J. I. Packer, and Dick Lucas. He had also built a robust ministry to University of Toronto students at Little Trinity.

In response, some older members of St. John's began to leave. But far more people came, many of them students at the nearby University of British Columbia. By 1981, weekly attendance had climbed from 70 to 300. A year after Robinson's arrival, Packer took an appointment at Regent College, where he remained for the rest of his life. Packer, considered one of the preeminent evangelical theologians, received an appointment as honorary assistant priest at St. John's, which he held until 2008.

Robinson presided over significant growth and renewal at St. John's. Future Saskatchewan Bishop Tony Burton said that Robinson took over "a moribund, complacent small congregation, and at considerable personal cost set it on the path to becoming Canada's largest Anglican community, and one of its liveliest and most creative." By the time Robinson retired in 1992, St. John's had grown to an average weekly attendance of 800 and was widely reported to be the largest Anglican church in Canada. Robinson also oversaw a $1.2 million renovation in 1990.

Robinson was succeeded by the Rev. David Short, a priest from the Anglican Diocese of Sydney and the son of Bishop Ken Short, who continued Robinson's low-church evangelical practices and teaching. In 1998, Short launched Artizo, a training program for priests that has graduated over 100 clergy. The church also developed educational resources used by more than 90 other churches. In 2007, St. John's planted a church in Richmond.

=== Anglican realignment ===
In 2002, the New Westminster synod controversially approved the blessing of same-sex unions. Packer, Short, and other delegates from St. John's, along with delegates from seven other churches, walked out of the synod in objection. The dissenting churches formed a group called the Anglican Communion in New Westminster (ACiNW) and declared impaired communion with Bishop Michael Ingham. Short and the other clergy walking out faced canonical charges from Ingham.

The synod decision became a major flashpoint in the Anglican realignment. After the failure of the ACiNW churches to obtain alternative episcopal oversight from within the Anglican Church of Canada, in February 2008 St. John's membership voted with 96 percent in favor to disaffiliate from the Anglican Church of Canada and become canonically resident in the Anglican Church of the Southern Cone. The Southern Cone agreed to provide primatial oversight for traditionalist Anglican churches in Canada as an interim step to creating an eventual parallel province in North America.

In April 2008, Short, Packer and St. John's vicar Dan Gifford formally relinquished their ministry in the Anglican Church of Canada and join the Anglican Network in Canada. The church was involved in litigation over the ownership of its $13 million property; the Supreme Court of British Columbia (a trial court jurisdiction) in 2009 affirmed that the property belonged to the Diocese of New Westminster. The higher B.C. Court of Appeal affirmed the ruling, and the Supreme Court of Canada declined to hear the case, resulting in all of the clergy and the bulk of the congregation leaving the 1950 building on September 18, 2011. The departing clergy members relaunched their church as St. John's Vancouver with about 700 members in rented facilities.

After the departure of the St. John's Vancouver group, the Diocese of New Westminster restarted worship services at St. John's Shaughnessy with a rotation of clergy. Attendance and giving at St. John's was reduced substantially by the departures. In 2015, the diocesan offices and archives moved to excess space on the St. John's campus. In 2016, the Ven. John Stephens was appointed rector; he would serve until being elected bishop of New Westminster in 2021. In 2020, a labyrinth was installed in the church, reducing seating capacity to 450. By 2021, St. John's had grown to 80–100 in weekly attendance, still far below the pre-schism levels but reaching medium-sized parish status in the diocese.

== Architecture ==
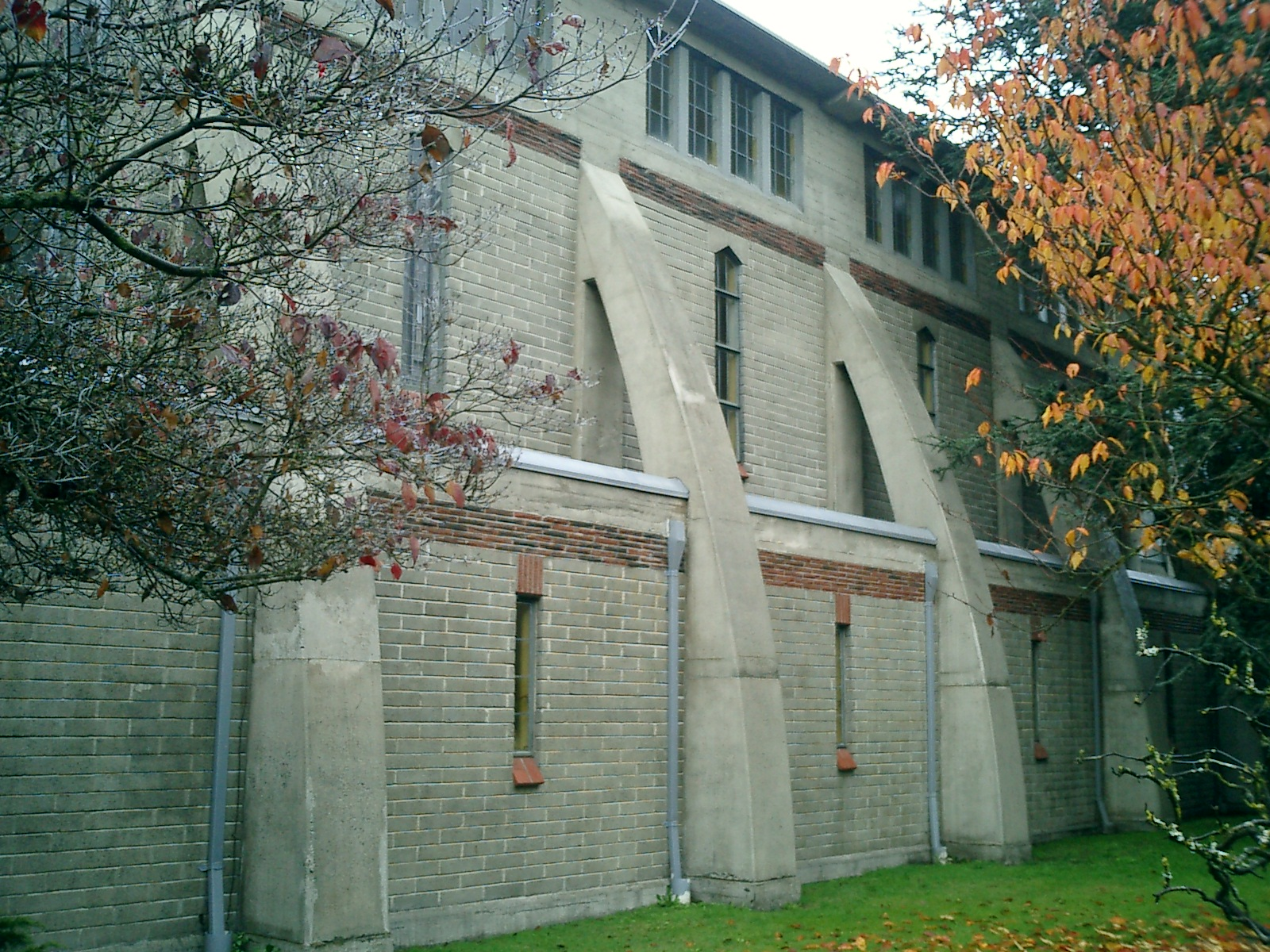
A side view of St. John's Shaughnessy showing narrow windows and moderne buttress arches.

The 1990 renovation uncovered gray Roman brick above the bullet windows and in bands on the church, as well as red tile sills, that were among "much of the fine detailing of this Gothic-inspired moderne church" that had been hidden by a layer of asphalt siding installed shortly after construction for weatherproofing. The renovation dramatically expanded the natural inside and allowed for disabled access. Additional renovations in the 2010s removed shutters from the front door and replaced the cross on the roof.

The church contains a number of sculptural elements. Just above the main entrance, an Art Deco frieze depicts three incidents in the life of John the Evangelist: John and James mending their nets by their fishing boat, the risen Christ with James and John seated at his feet, and John with Mary, the mother of Jesus, at the foot of the Cross. The frieze, as well as reliefs in the bell tower, are the work of sculptor Beatrice Lennie.

The interior of the church also features several carvings. The pulpit and lectern were built from mahogany and yellow cedar, with a black walnut cross on the front of the pulpit along with a frieze of dogwood flowers and arbutus leaves. The wooden pews date to the construction of the church and feature hand-painted flowers on yellow cedar panels at the end of each pew, artwork done by Barbara Sharp, whose father designed the church.

The church originally included two side chapels. Today, the lady chapel on the south side of the nave is used for the traditional-language early Sunday Holy Communion service. The north side chapel was converted to flexible space for families with children or pre-function purposes.

The former parish hall—now the diocesan headquarters—was built from 1955 to 1956 to the east of the church. The parish hall is connected to the church by a cloister, both to a design by G. L. Thornton Sharp.

=== Windows ===
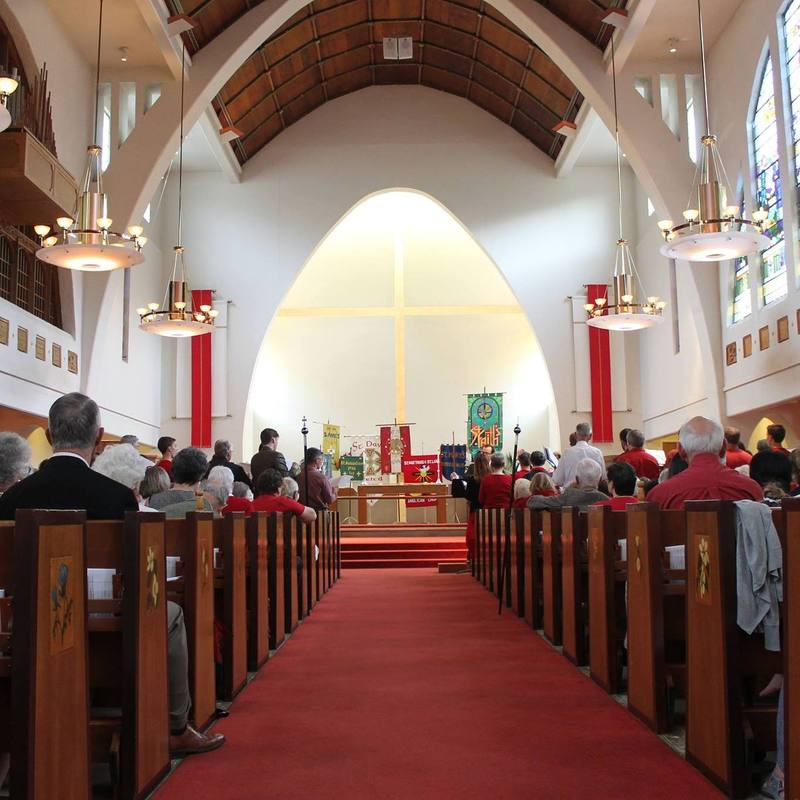
The interior of St. John's Shaughnessy during a church service.

Many of St. John's windows are memorial windows in keeping with the church's purpose as a World War II memorial. The most prominent window is a five-panel stained-glass window in a large arch across the south side of the nave. It was designed by prominent Canadian stained glass artist Yvonne Williams and was installed and dedicated in 1951 “in loving memory of all those who fell in the world wars in service of their country." The window depicts Christ on the cross with the words “Lift up your hearts” inscribed in an arch beneath him. Beneath the cross, two disciples kneel before a communion table containing a chalice with rays of light shining on it. The central panel depicts the coat of arms of British Columbia. Side panels depict men and women in the Canadian Forces.

Two narrow windows in the chancel are made of 11th century glass fragments from Canterbury Cathedral, whose windows were shattered during German bombing raids during the war. The Canterbury windows were dedicated in 1970. Stained glass windows in the street-facing west wall of the bell tower depict St. Michael and St. George. The windows are respectively dedicated to Oscar Beale, killed in World War I, and George Alexander Walkem and his son, George Rodney A. Walkem, who was killed in World War II.

=== Organ ===
St. John's features two organs. The main organ, built by Hallman Organ Company, has four manuals and six divisions, with sixty-six ranks and 3,686 organ pipes. It was installed in 1968 at a cost of more than $100,000. During the organ's installation, the choir moved to the gallery and formed a new ensemble called the Gallery Singers. A separate organ in the gallery has 700 pipes and its own console.

=== Heritage listing ===
St. John's is one of only a few modern Art Deco buildings on the Vancouver Heritage Register, where it is listed as a C-class entry so classified for its character and contextual significance.

== Notable people ==
A number of notable clergy and laity have been associated with St. John's Shaughnessy over its history, including:

- Dan Gifford, vicar and future bishop of the Anglican Network in Canada
- Felix Orji, associate rector and future bishop of the Anglican Diocese of the West
- Philip Owen, lifelong member, vestryman, and mayor of Vancouver
- Walter Stewart Owen, lieutenant governor of British Columbia
- J. I. Packer, theologian and honorary assistant
- David Short, rector (1992–2011)
- John Stephens, rector and future bishop of New Westminster
