= St. John's Vancouver =

Large Anglican church in Vancouver, British Columbia, Canada

- St. John's Vancouver Anglican Church
- St. John's Vancouver
- 49.2371°N 123.1217°W
- Location: Vancouver, British Columbia
- Country: Canada
- Denomination: Anglican Church in North America
- Website: www.stjohnsvancouver.org

History
- Founded: 2011

Administration
- Diocese: Canada

Clergy
- Rector: Jordan Senner

St. John's Vancouver Anglican Church (known in short as "St. John's Vancouver") is an evangelical Anglican church in Vancouver, British Columbia, Canada. It was founded in 2011 by the clergy and almost all of the laity of St. John's Shaughnessy after the group left the Anglican Church of Canada over theological and moral issues and the congregation lost a legal battle to keep its building during the Anglican realignment. With more than 700 in regular attendance, it is the largest church in the Anglican Diocese of Canada, a diocese of the Anglican Church in North America.

== History ==
Until 2011, St. John's Vancouver shares its history with St. John's Shaughnessy, which was founded in 1925 and whose building was dedicated in 1950. By the 1970s, St. John's had become known for high-church Anglo-Catholic liturgies. The church's membership had significantly declined and the church's finances were deteriorating. The vestry called the Rev. Harry Robinson, a prominent low-church evangelical within the Anglican Church of Canada, as rector in 1978. During his theological studies in England, he had befriended notable evangelicals like John R. W. Stott, J. I. Packer, and Dick Lucas and he had experience developing a strong student ministry. A year after Robinson's arrival, Packer took an appointment at Regent College. Considered one of the preeminent evangelical theologians, Packer also received an appointment as honorary assistant priest at St. John's, which he held until his death in 2020.

Robinson presided over significant growth and renewal at St. John's. Future Saskatchewan Bishop Tony Burton said that Robinson took over "a moribund, complacent small congregation, and at considerable personal cost set it on the path to becoming Canada's largest Anglican community, and one of its liveliest and most creative." By the time Robinson retired in 1992, St. John's had grown to an average weekly attendance of 800 and was widely reported to be the largest Anglican church in Canada.

Robinson was succeeded by the Rev. David Short, a priest from the Anglican Diocese of Sydney and the son of Bishop Ken Short, who continued Robinson's low-church evangelical practices and teaching. In 1998, Short launched Artizo, a training program for priests that has graduated over 100 clergy. The church also developed educational resources used by more than 90 other churches. In 2007, St. John's planted a church in Richmond.

=== Anglican realignment ===
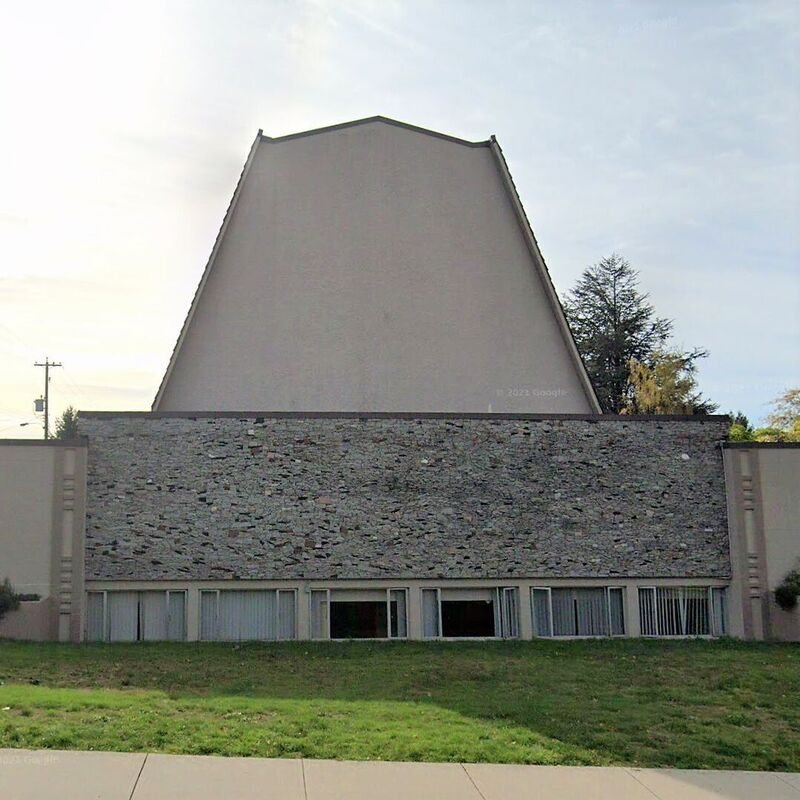
Since 2011, St. John's Vancouver has rented Oakridge Seventh-Day Adventist Church, pictured here, for Sunday services.

In 2002, the Diocese of New Westminster synod controversially approved the blessing of same-sex unions. Packer, Short, and other delegates from St. John's, along with delegates from seven other churches, walked out of the synod in objection. The dissenting churches formed a group called the Anglican Communion in New Westminster (ACiNW) and declared impaired communion with Bishop Michael Ingham. Short and the other clergy walking out faced canonical charges from Ingham.

The synod decision became a major flashpoint in the Anglican realignment. After the failure of the ACiNW churches to obtain alternative episcopal oversight from within the Anglican Church of Canada, in February 2008 St. John's membership voted with 96 percent in favour to disaffiliate from the Anglican Church of Canada and become canonically resident in the Anglican Church of the Southern Cone. The Southern Cone agreed to provide primatial oversight for traditionalist Anglican churches in Canada as an interim step to creating an eventual parallel province in North America.

In April 2008, Short, Packer and St. John's vicar Dan Gifford formally relinquished their ministry in the Anglican Church of Canada and join the Anglican Network in Canada. The church was involved in litigation over the ownership of its $13 million property; the Supreme Court of British Columbia (a trial court jurisdiction) in 2009 affirmed that the property belonged to the Diocese of New Westminster. The higher B.C. Court of Appeal affirmed the ruling, and the Supreme Court of Canada declined to hear the case, resulting in all of the clergy and the bulk of the congregation leaving the 1950 building on September 18, 2011. The departing clergy members relaunched the church as St. John's Vancouver with about 700 members in rented facilities at Oakridge Seventh-Day Adventist Church.

Since 2011, St. John's Vancouver has held steady at around 700 in weekly attendance. In 2022, Gifford was consecrated as the new diocesan bishop of ANiC, and St. John's Vancouver began planning for a $12–25 million capital project to buy or build a permanent church building.

== Ministries ==
=== Artizo Institute and church planting ===
Since 1998, nearly 100 clergy have been trained through St. John's Artizo Institute, which provides a two-year apprenticeship for junior clergy to complement seminary education. Artizo graduates may move on to a residency, similar to a curacy, at another church. Artizo graduates serve ANiC churches across Canada, as well as churches throughout the Anglican Church in North America. They also serve in Lutheran, Reformed, C&MA, and non-denominational contexts across the English-speaking world.

Many Artizo graduates have served as church planters, and St. John's has during its history planted several churches, including St. Peter's Fireside in downtown Vancouver, St. John's Richmond, and a new church plant in the area encompassing East Vancouver, Burnaby, and New Westminster.

=== International partnerships ===
St. John's Vancouver partners with Helping Point in India, Ratanak International in Cambodia, and the Anglican Diocese of the Upper Shire in Malawi.
