= Robert Seaborn =

Canadian bishop

Robert Lowder Seaborn (July 9, 1911 – February 15, 1993) was a Canadian minister of the Anglican faith. He was the Anglican Bishop of Newfoundland in Canada from 1965 to 1980.

Born in Toronto, Ontario he attended Normal Model School and completed high school at the University of Toronto Schools. He earned a BA in Classics in 1932 and a degree in divinity at University of Trinity College at the University of Toronto and spent 1936–37 at Oxford University. He was ordained deacon in 1934, priest in 1935 and served as assistant curate in his initial parish, St. Simon-the-Apostle Church in Toronto, followed by St. James' Cathedral Toronto from 1937 to 1941. He then became rector of St. Peter's in Cobourg, Ontario (1941–48).

== World War II ==
During World War II Seaborn spent a winter training in Debert, Nova Scotia and then was posted overseas in the spring of 1943. He served as Padre for the 1st Battalion, Canadian Scottish Regiment from 1943 to 1945 and participated in the D-Day Normandy Landings. As part of that landing he held individual services on all three ships over which the Canadian Scottish Regiment was scattered. He won a Military Cross during the Juno Beach fighting for carrying wounded to safety while under fire. He was awarded the "Croix de Guerre" by the French Government. On July 15, 1944, he appeared in a photograph saying a prayer over a soldier of the 3rd Canadian Infantry Division. This photo has appeared many times since in publications related to World War II and served as the basis for a stained glass window located in Ottawa, Ontario.

== Post-World War II ==
Following the war, Seaborn returned to the Anglican Church of Canada, serving as Rector of the Anglican Cathedral of the Holy Trinity, Quebec City and Dean of Quebec, (1948–57), Rector of St. Mary's Kerrisdale Vancouver, British Columbia (1957–58), and in both Corner Brook and St. John's, Newfoundland. Bishop Seaborn was the 15th Metropolitan of the Ecclesiastical Province of Canada, serving from 1975 to 1980.

In 1976 he oversaw reorganization of the one Newfoundland diocese into three - the Diocese of Eastern Newfoundland and Labrador with its cathedral at St. John's, the Diocese of Central Newfoundland (Gander) and the Diocese of Western Newfoundland (Corner Brook). This made him the 8th and final Bishop of Newfoundland and the only one to be named Metropolitan of Canada. During the 1960s he was involved in the integration of the Anglican, United Church, Salvation Army, and Presbyterian educational services in Newfoundland. Along with his wife, Mary Elizabeth (Betty), he spearheaded the founding of KillDevil Camp in Gros Morne National Park in Western Newfoundland. The camp's central building has since been named Seaborn Lodge.

Seaborn later returned to Ontario and served as chancellor of University of Trinity College at the University of Toronto from 1982 to 1990 and Bishop Ordinary to the Canadian Forces from 1980 to 1986. Bishop Seaborn died in Cobourg, Ontario on February 15, 1993. His brother, J. Blair Seaborn, was a longtime Canadian civil servant and diplomat.

== Honorary degrees ==
- Montreal Diocesan Theological College - 1980
- Memorial University - Doctor of Laws - Spring Convocation, May 1972
- Bishop's University - Doctor of Civil Laws, 1962

== Notes ==
Religious titles
Preceded by John Alfred Meaden	Bishop of Newfoundland; 1965 – 1976	Diocese split
New diocese	Bishop of Eastern Newfoundland and Labrador; 1976 – 1980	Succeeded by Martin Mate
