= John Meaden =

Canadian Anglican diocesan from 1956 to 1965

John Alfred Meaden (1892-1987) served as diocesan bishop of the Diocese of Newfoundland from 1956 to 1965. He was the seventh Bishop of the Diocese.

Meaden received an honorary Doctor of Laws from the Memorial University of Newfoundland in May 1960.

== Writings ==
He published two small books:

- The Anglican Church in Newfoundland
- More Historical Notes: Queen's College, Newfoundland

Religious titles
Preceded by Philip Selwyn Abraham	Bishop of Newfoundland; 1956 – 1965	Succeeded by Robert Lowder Seaborn
