= Llewellyn Jones (bishop) =

British-born Canadian Anglican bishop

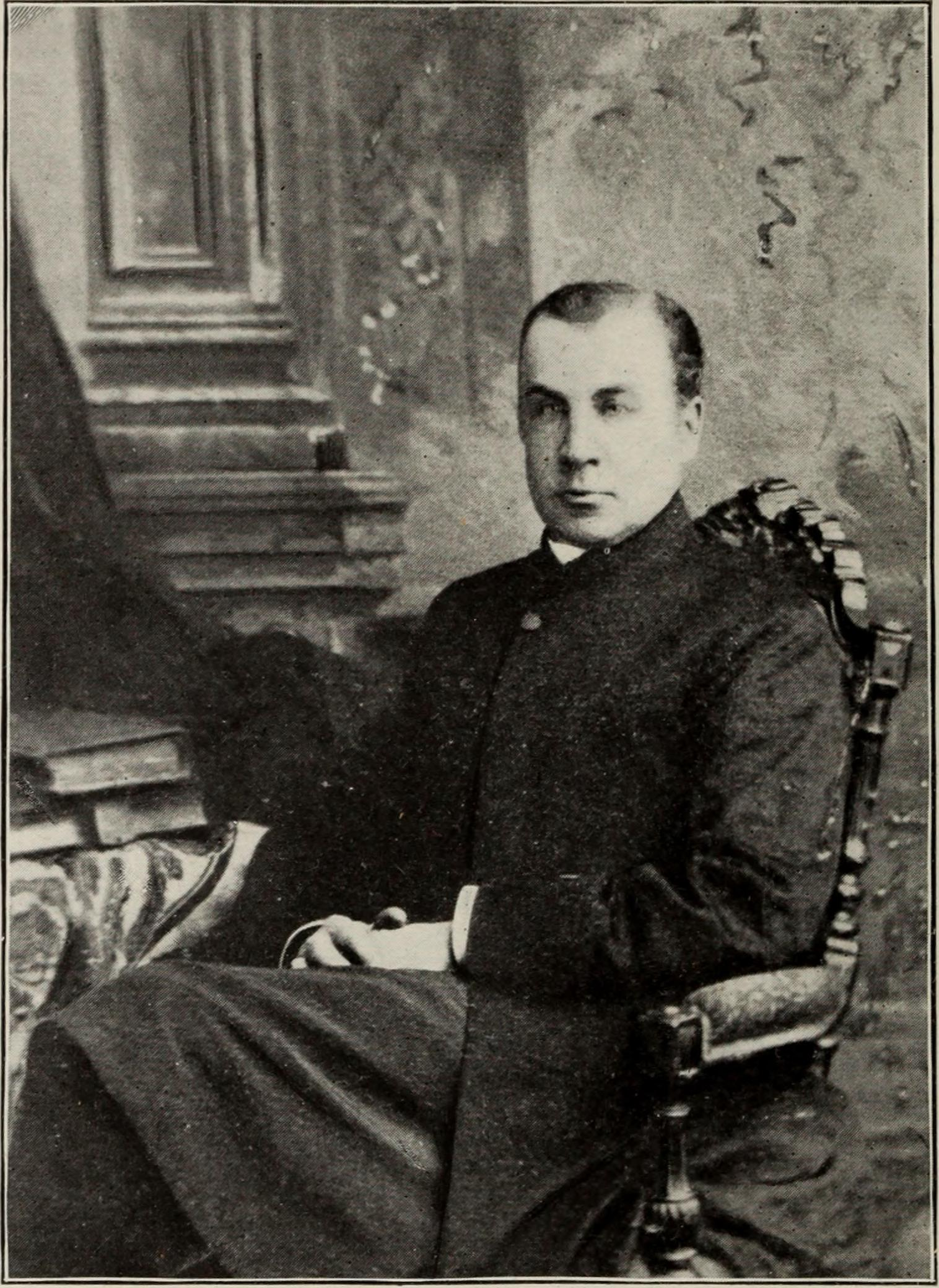
Llewellyn Jones in 1902

Llewellyn Jones (1840–1918) was the fourth Anglican Bishop of Newfoundland.

== Life ==
Jones was born in Liverpool, England, on 11 October 1840. He was consecrated Bishop of Newfoundland on 1 May 1878 by Archbishop Tait of Canterbury, with Bishops Jackson (London) and Atlay (Hereford) assisting. His predecessor, James Kelly, had resigned in 1877 due an aversion to sailing.

Jones arrived at St. John's on 4 June. He was installed the Bishop of Newfoundland by the Revd Thomas M. Wood, who was the bishop's commissary.

Following the devastating fire of 1892, Jones rebuilt the Cathedral of St. John the Baptist.

The Great Fire of 1892 in St. John's destroyed much of the city and extensively damaged the cathedral. The only stained-glass windows to survive the disaster were in the sacristy off the right of the main altar where the vestments were stored. Three years later the difficult task of reconstruction began. Restoration work continued under the guidance of the diocese's fourth bishop, Llewellyn Jones, and was not finished until 1905.

Jones died on 9 January 1918.

Church of England titles
Preceded by James Butler Knill Kelly	Bishop of Newfoundland; 1878–1917	Succeeded by William White
