= Samuel Rose (bishop) =

Canadian Anglican bishop

The Right Reverend Samuel Rose
- Bishop of Eastern Newfoundland and Labrador
- Church: Anglican Church of Canada
- Diocese: Eastern Newfoundland and Labrador
- In office: 2020–present
- Predecessor: Geoff Peddle

Orders
- Ordination: 2001
- Consecration: December 15, 2020 by John Watton

Personal details
- Born: January 21, 1975 (age 51) Bell Island, Newfoundland and Labrador

Samuel Vincent Rose (born January 21, 1975) is a Canadian Anglican bishop. Elected and consecrated in 2020, he is the sixth diocesan bishop of the Diocese of Eastern Newfoundland and Labrador in the Anglican Church of Canada. Prior to his election as bishop, Rose was archdeacon and diocesan executive officer.

A lifelong Anglican, Rose was born and baptized on Bell Island in 1975. He is married to Jill, an assistant principal, and has two children. Rose received his B.A. from Memorial University of Newfoundland and his M.Div. from Queen's College, St. John's. He was ordained as a priest in 2001. He also edited Anglican Life, the newspaper of the Anglican Church's three dioceses in Newfoundland and Labrador.

== Notes ==
Anglican Communion titles
Preceded by Geoff Peddle	Bishop of Eastern Newfoundland and Labrador; 2020–present	Incumbent
