= Hilda Hellaby =

Canadian missionary and deaconess (1898–1983)

Hilda Hellaby CM
- Hellaby c. 1929
- Born: 1898; Essex, England
- Died: December 6, 1983 (aged 85); Whitehorse, Yukon, Canada
- Education: Anglican Theological College (L.Th.)
- Occupations: Missionary; Deaconess
- Known for: Mission work among Chinese Canadians in Vancouver and First Nations people in Yukon
- Children: 1 (adopted)
- Awards: Honorary doctorate, University of British Columbia (1964); Canadian Centennial Medal (1967); Member of the Order of Canada (1973); Queen Elizabeth II Silver Jubilee Medal (1977)

Hilda Alice Hellaby (1898 – 6 December 1983) was an English-born Canadian missionary and deaconess. She immigrated to Canada as a child, and after completing high school began missionary work with the Anglican mission to Chinese Canadians in Vancouver, including teaching children and adults, providing social services, leading religious services and managing food relief. Set apart as a deaconess, she was the first woman in Canada to obtain a licentiate in theology and the first woman in the Anglican Church of Canada licenced to preach.

After three decades of ministry work in Vancouver, Hellaby was asked to work at a hostel in Yukon. She lived in the territory for the rest of her life, leading religious services and preaching at several parish churches and serving in administrative roles for the Diocese of Yukon. Hellaby also conducted a ministry of outreach and visitation to First Nations people who were imprisoned. While she never became an ordained minister, her career was identified as a reason that women should be ordained to the priesthood, even though she was personally ambivalent about the change.

Hellaby's life of ministry was honoured with a doctorate of divinity from the Anglican Theological College in Vancouver as well as the Order of Canada. She was the first person from Yukon to be admitted to the order.

== Early life and education ==
Hilda Hellaby was born in Essex, England, in 1898. She immigrated to Canada with her widowed mother and sister at age nine, and they settled in Vancouver, where Hilda graduated from high school.

== Missionary work in Vancouver ==
Hellaby began work as a missionary to Chinese Canadians in Vancouver in 1920, teaching English in night schools and in a kindergarten during the day. She learned Cantonese from a returned missionary. At Good Shepherd Mission, she taught a Chinese-language kindergarten for children and night school for women, and conducted social service work. In the mid-1920s, when—following the transfer of priest George Lim-Yuen in 1924 and after a Chinese catechist died as well as due to the 1923 ban on Chinese immigration—no new catechist was available, Hellaby took the services at the Good Shepherd Mission.

In 1924 Hellaby was interviewed about the Vancouver Chinatown community by Winifred Rauschenbusch in Robert E. Park's Survey of Race Relations. Additionally, in 1925 she co-authored the book Oriental Missions in British Columbia with Neville Lascelles Ward.

In 1928, she was set apart as a deaconess by Archbishop of New Westminster Adam de Pencier. She became the first woman in Canada to be awarded a licentiate in theology when she graduated from the University of British Columbia's Anglican Theological College in 1930. She was also the first woman in the Anglican Church of Canada licenced to preach.

During the Great Depression, social service needs in Canada rose so much that the government asked the Chinese mission agency to take over the administration of relief to Chinese Canadians. Working through the Anglican Board of Missions, Hellaby managed meal programs for indigent Chinese Vancouverites, serving up to 1,200 people at a time. She calmed demonstrators when Communist-inspired riots erupted in the Chinese soup kitchen. When World War II began, employment rose and the relief work was limited to elderly Chinese Canadians, including those who had come to Canada to build the Canadian Pacific Railway. During the war, Hellaby returned to work at the Chinese mission and assisted at the Good Angel Chinese Anglican parish in Vernon, British Columbia, overseen by George Lim-Yuen until 1941.

== Life in Yukon ==
In 1950, after three decades in mission work in Vancouver, Hellaby took a temporary role in Dawson City managing a hostel for First Nations students who stayed there during school terms. She ended up staying there until 1952, when she was asked by the bishop of Yukon to fill in at the Anglican church in Mayo after a vacancy caused when the priest died in a fishing accident. While in Mayo, she reopened the nearby native village school, walking three miles each way to start a heating fire. She later advocated for First Nations people to relocate from the village to Mayo. She was later assigned to the joint parish of St. George, Carmacks and Pelly Crossing. She led the construction of a log church in Pelly. While at Pelly, she began a ministry of visiting First Nations prisoners after a young Native man killed his mother in a fit of drunkenness and was ostracised by the community; Hellaby regularly visited him while in prison.

Hellaby moved to Whitehorse in 1967 to serve as the secretary of the Diocese of Yukon. She also preached at Christ Church Cathedral and conducted services throughout Yukon. She worked as secretary to the bishop of Yukon and edited a quarterly Anglican magazine. She would travel around the territory by dog sled and bus.

Hellaby was well-known in Yukon for her companionship of First Nations people who were dealing with the legal system. She would accompany the accused to court and would visit First Nations inmates in British Columbia jails. Often the only visitor these inmates would receive, she would conduct calming prayer services with familiar hymns and bring news from home. She also advocated for First Nations interests with businesses in Yukon. For example, United Keno Hill Mines accepted her suggestions about allowances for local men to receive time off during hunting season.

== Personal life ==
Hellaby adopted a Chinese daughter named Felicity in 1936. Felicity accompanied Hellaby to Yukon and later married and had children. Hellaby was a member of the New Democratic Party.

Hellaby died in Whitehorse on 6 December 1983 at age 85.

== Ordination of women ==
Hellaby never served in ordained ministry, although the later years of her career coincided with the process of authorising the ordination of women in the Anglican Church of Canada. In 1975, when the ACC was on the verge of performing its first ordinations to the priesthood and with several dozen female deacons already ordained, the Toronto Star described Hellaby, "by the outstanding example of her life, [as] perhaps the outstanding argument for allowing women in the priesthood."

During her career in Yukon, bishops authorised Hellaby to conduct several ministerial functions. When she had charge of the Pelly parish, she was authorised to perform every function except for marriages and the celebration of Holy Communion, the latter of which is reserved to priests. She believed that there was a place in full-time ministry for women, "if only in their historic roles as teachers, nurses and guardians of the young." She noted that it was only in her own lifetime "that the ancient office of deaconesses has been revived". She said that "women should be made full use of in the work of the church, and have full voice in her counsels."

However, Hellaby was more ambivalent about the ordination of women as priests. "We women will get best results if we don't push," she said in 1964. "We should take as many courses as we can to improve our knowledge for the church's benefit. . . . Let's wait to be invited." By 1975, her bishop, John Frame, was one of the strongest opponents of women's ordination to priesthood. She said that at her age, being ordained "would only be an honorary sort of thing. I could not expect to carry out the functions of a priest as I see them." She also feared that the admission of women to the priesthood "will result in a split in the church. We women have waited a good many centuries and I think we should wait a little more."

== Legacy ==
Hellaby received several awards over her career, including being the first woman to receive an honorary doctorate of divinity from the University of British Columbia in 1964, and receiving the Canadian Centennial Medal in 1967, the Order of Canada in 1973 and the Queen Elizabeth II Silver Jubilee Medal in 1977. The parish hall at Christ Church Cathedral in Whitehorse is named in her honour. She was the first Yukoner to be awarded the Order of Canada.

A Whitehorse court official said in 1975 that she was "the nearest we are ever likely to get to meeting a saint in the Yukon". Frank Jones of the Toronto Star called her "the closest approximation to a saint that I have ever met. Part of her saintliness was that she labored for a lifetime without grumbling in a church which refused to give her and others of her sex their due."
