= Don Harvey (bishop) =

Canadian Anglican bishop (born 1939)

The Right Reverend Don Harvey
- Moderator Bishop of the Anglican Network in Canada
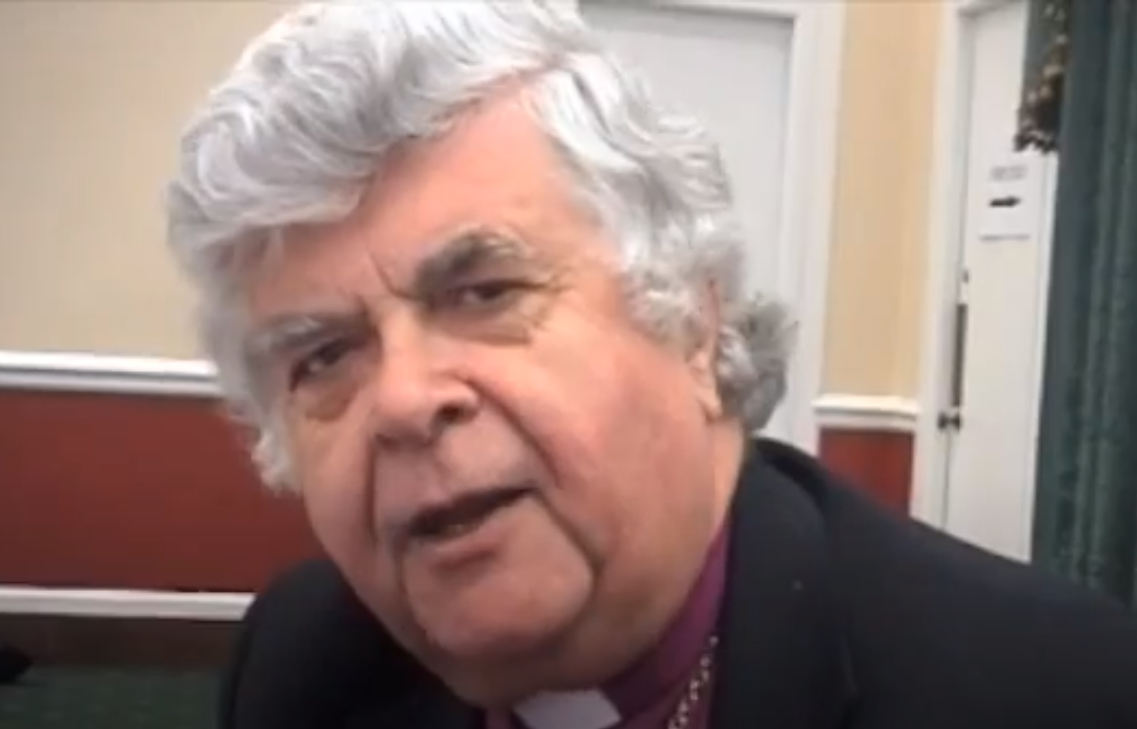
- Church: Anglican Church in North America
- Diocese: Canada
- In office: 2007–2014
- Predecessor: See created
- Successor: Charlie Masters
- Other posts: Bishop of Eastern Newfoundland and Labrador at the Anglican Church of Canada

Orders
- Ordination: 1964
- Consecration: 1993 by Michael Peers

Personal details
- Born: 13 November 1939 (age 86) St. John's, Newfoundland

Donald Frederick Harvey (born 13 September 1939) is a Canadian Anglican bishop. He was the Moderator Bishop and director of the Anglican Network in Canada, a founding diocese of the Anglican Church in North America, from 2009 to 2014, and the Director of Anglican Essentials Canada. He was previously the Bishop of Eastern Newfoundland and Labrador in the Anglican Church of Canada from 1993 to 2004.

== Early life and family ==
Born in St John's, Newfoundland on 13 September 1939, Harvey was educated at the Memorial University of Newfoundland and, following a short period of service as a school teacher, ordained a priest in the Anglican Church of Canada in 1964. He published his M.A. dissertation in 1987 on the life and poetry of the Reverend John Keble, a founding member of the Anglo-Catholic movement, and lectured in English language and literature at the Memorial University of Newfoundland. He also taught Pastoral Theology at Queen's College, also in St. John's, Newfoundland. The degree of Doctor of Divinity, honoris causa, was conferred on Harvey by Nashotah House in October 2009. He and his wife, Trudy, make their home in St. John's, Newfoundland.

== Anglican Church of Canada ==
Harvey was an ACC priest for 30 years in various parishes in Newfoundland and Labrador, including Portugal Cove, Twillingate, King's Cove, Happy Valley, St. Michael and All Angels in St. John's and a six-year appointment as a university chaplain.

He became the Dean of the Cathedral of St John the Baptist, St. John's, Newfoundland in 1989. He was elevated to the ACC episcopate in 1993 as Bishop of Eastern Newfoundland and Labrador. He opposed revisionist interpretations of the Bible that would lead to the acceptance of blessing of same-sex unions by the Anglican Diocese of New Westminster in 2002. He retired as a bishop of the Anglican Church of Canada in 2004 after 12 years.

== Anglican Church in North America ==
In November 2007, Harvey relinquished his ministry in the Anglican Church of Canada pursuant to Canon XIX of the General Synod, and was received into the Anglican Church of the Southern Cone under its primate, Gregory Venables. In becoming a bishop in the Southern Cone, he came out of retirement, resumed full-time episcopal ministry on a volunteer basis as Moderator Bishop of the Anglican Network in Canada, a founding diocese of the Anglican Church in North America in 2009, and began to offer episcopal oversight to a number of Canadian Anglican parishes that no longer believed the Anglican Church of Canada was doctrinally orthodox.

Reflecting on his 43 years of ordained ministry in the Anglican Church of Canada, Harvey has said that his cherished hope is that the church will be able to reform.

Harvey retired as bishop/moderator of the Anglican Network in Canada in June 2014, being succeeded by co-adjutor bishop Charlie Masters. In retirement he serves as honorary assistant and bishop in residence at the Anglican Church of the Good Samaritan in St. John's.

Anglican Communion titles
| Preceded by Martin Mate | Bishop of Eastern Newfoundland and Labrador; 1993 – 2004 | Succeeded by Cyrus Clement James Pitman |
| New title | I Moderator Bishop of the Anglican Network in Canada; 2007–2014 | Succeeded by Charlie Masters |
