= William White (bishop of Newfoundland) =

Canadian Anglican bishop

Right Reverend William Charles White DD

Anglican Bishop of Newfoundland
- In office 1918–1942
- Preceded by: Llewellyn Jones
- Succeeded by: Philip Abraham

Personal details
- Born: August 31, 1865 Trinity Bay, Newfoundland Colony
- Died: June 14, 1943 (aged 77) St. John's, Dominion of Newfoundland

William Charles White (August 31, 1865 – June 14, 1943) was the 5th Anglican Bishop of Newfoundland (1918–42).

White was born at Trinity Bay, Newfoundland and his father was Robert White.

White was a curate of Bonavista; rector of Fogo (1890–1900), Heart's Content (1900–1908), and the Cathedral of St. John the Baptist, St. John's (1908–1917).

White was the first native born bishop of the Diocese of Eastern Newfoundland and Labrador. He ordained "70 Queen's men during his term of office."

Church of England titles
Preceded by Llewellyn Jones	Bishop of Newfoundland; 1918 – 1942	Succeeded by Philip Selwyn Abraham
