= Diocese of Newfoundland =

Former Anglican diocese in Canada

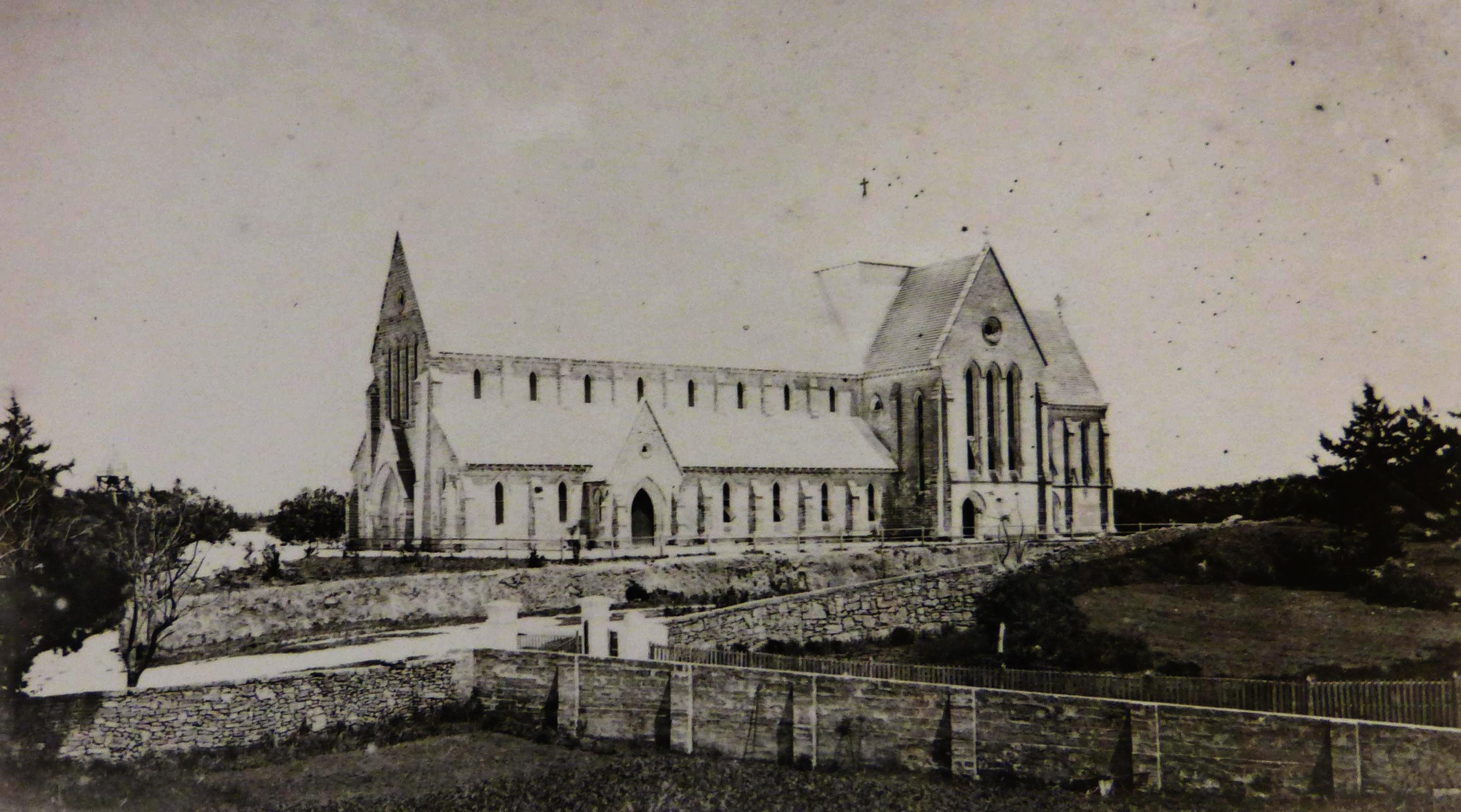
Trinity Church in 1879, the chapel-of-ease in the City of Hamilton, Bermuda, for the then Bishop of Newfoundland and Bermuda (the Cathedral of St. John the Baptist was at St. John's, Newfoundland).

The Anglican Diocese of Newfoundland was, from its creation in 1839 until 1879, the Diocese of Newfoundland and Bermuda, with the Cathedral of St. John the Baptist at St. John's, Newfoundland, and a chapel-of-ease named Trinity Church in the City of Hamilton in Pembroke Parish, Bermuda (not to be confused either with the parish church for Pembroke Parish, St. John's, or with Holy Trinity Church, the parish church of Hamilton Parish).

Newfoundland and Bermuda had both been parts of British North America until they were left out of the 1867 Confederation of Canada. In 1842, her jurisdiction was described as "Newfoundland, the Bermudas". In 1879 the Church of England in the British Overseas Territory of Bermuda (since 1978, an extra-provincial diocese of the archbishop of Canterbury re-titled the Anglican Church of Bermuda) was created, but it continued to be grouped with the Diocese of Newfoundland under the bishop of Newfoundland and Bermuda until 1919, when Newfoundland and Bermuda each received their own bishop.

In 1976 the Diocese of Newfoundland was reorganised and three autonomous dioceses were created: Eastern Newfoundland and Labrador, Central Newfoundland, and Western Newfoundland.

The three dioceses jointly support Queen's College and other ministries, and have many common interests.

== Bishops ==
Diocesan bishops of Newfoundland
Name	Lifespan	Diocesan (dates)
Aubrey Spencer	1793–1872	1839–1843
Edward Feild	1801–1876	1844–1876
James Kelly	1832–1907	1876–1877
Llewellyn Jones	1840–1918	1878–1917
William White	1873–1943	1918–1942
Philip Abraham	1897–1955	1942–1955 (coadjutor, 1937)
John Meaden	1892–1987	1956–1965
Robert Seaborn	1911–1993	1965 to reorganization

William Legge was suffragan bishop, and became diocesan bishop, of Western Newfoundland when the diocese split.
