= Anglican Essentials Canada =

Canadian orthodox Christian group

Logo of Anglican Essentials Canada.

Anglican Essentials Canada is a Christian group of Anglicans who share a common commitment to "faithful biblical orthodoxy," often broadly meaning an opposition to progressive norms embraced in the late 20th and early 21st century (especially the issue of marriage equality and acceptance of LGBT people), but also reflecting a general trend toward conservatism and orthodoxy in thought and practice.

== History ==
Conservative Anglicans formed the group in 1994 to represent their interests within the Anglican Church of Canada. It was previously named "the Essentials movement"' and then, in 2005, launched as the Essentials Federation and the Anglican Network in Canada before 750 delegates, most of them Canadian Anglicans, during a gathering dubbed the "Open Door Conference". There were also visitors from the United States and other countries.

== Stated goals ==
Anglican Essentials Canada states they "offer support to Canadian Anglicans who wish to remain true to biblically-faithful, historically-authentic Anglicanism." Anglican Essentials Canada stands for the supremacy of the complete Canon of Holy Scripture, the Book of Common Prayer as the standard of doctrine and worship, the Ordinal, and the Articles of Religion affirmed by the Lambeth Conference of 1968.

Although one of the constituent groups is the Prayer Book Society, Anglican Essentials Canada states that the Book of Alternative Services meets a widely felt need for contemporary liturgy, and brings life and joy to many Anglican worshippers". They are neutral on the matter of the ordination of women and include women priests among their ranks. They are opposed to the blessing of same-sex unions.

== Subgroups ==
Within Anglican Essentials Canada there are two sub-groups: The Essentials Federation and the Anglican Network in Canada.

- The Essentials Federation is dedicated to working for the Essentials cause within the Anglican Church of Canada.
- The Anglican Network in Canada, or Essentials Network, is a Canadian church established in 2005 under the jurisdiction of the Anglican Province of the Southern Cone, a province of the Anglican Communion. It joined the Anglican Church in North America in June 2009.

== Ecumenical relations ==
In October 2009, Anglican Essentials' leadership reacted to the Roman Catholic Church's proposed creation of personal ordinariates for disaffected traditionalist Anglicans by saying that this provision would probably not have a great impact on the majority of its affiliated laity and clergy, who are already pastorally satisfied with the current Anglican realignment movement.

== See also ==
- Anglican Coalition in Canada
- Anglican Diocese of Canada
- Anglican Church in North America
