= Church of the Good Shepherd (Vancouver) =

Anglican church in Vancouver, British Columbia, Canada

- Anglican Network Church of the Good Shepherd
- 聖公會牧愛堂
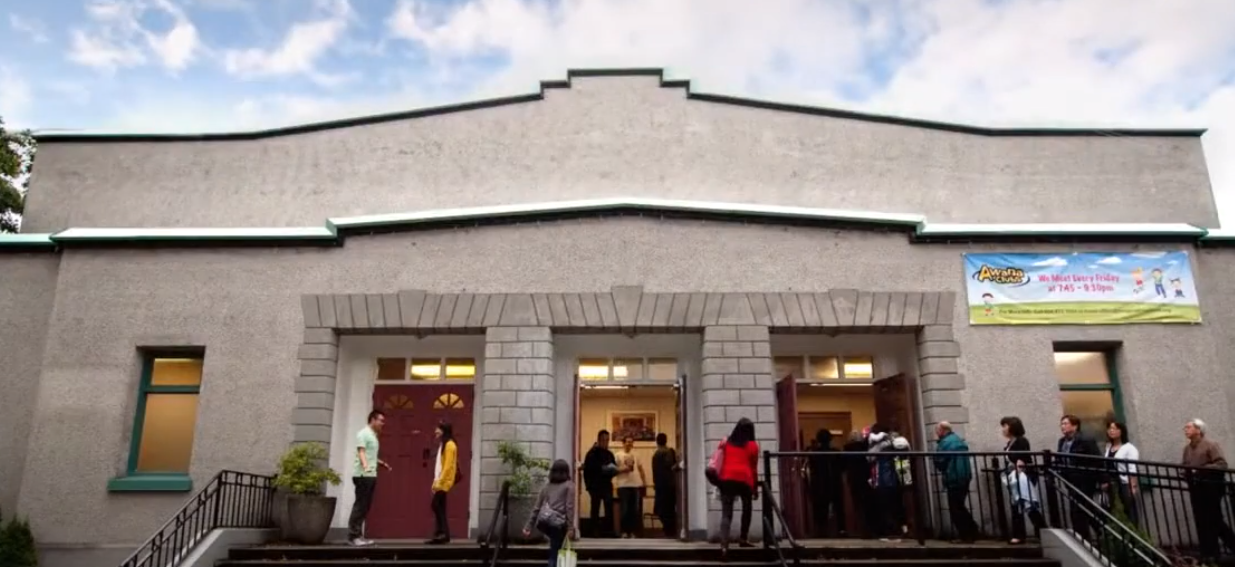
- The Church of the Good Shepherd pictured from W. 11th Avenue
- Church of the Good Shepherd
- 49.2614°N 123.1091°W
- Location: 189 W. 11th Avenue, Vancouver, British Columbia
- Country: Canada
- Language(s): English, Cantonese, Mandarin
- Denomination: Anglican Church in North America
- Previous denomination: Anglican Church of Canada
- Website: ancgoodshepherd.org

History
- Founded: c. 1880
- Founder: J. Sheepshanks

Architecture
- Years built: 1929–32
- Completed: 1932

Specifications
- Capacity: 1,000
- Materials: Reinforced concrete

Administration
- Diocese: Canada

Clergy
- Rector: Stephen Leung

The Church of the Good Shepherd (formally the Anglican Network Church of the Good Shepherd) is an Anglican church in Vancouver, British Columbia, Canada. It was the first Chinese-speaking Anglican church in Canada, remains known for serving the Chinese Canadian community in Greater Vancouver, and grew to be the largest Chinese Anglican congregation in Canada.

The congregation began as a mission to migrant Chinese workers in the 1880s before becoming the Good Shepherd Mission of the Anglican Diocese of New Westminster in 1892. It relocated multiple times within Vancouver as the congregation grew, reaching more than 200 members by 2008. Good Shepherd was an active participant in debates over same-sex blessings in the Anglican Church of Canada (ACC) during the Anglican realignment, joining several other congregations in walking out of New Westminster synod in 2002 over the issue. In 2008, the congregation left the ACC and joined the Anglican Network in Canada. After litigation, the church lost its real estate assets to the diocese, but it retained a multi-million-dollar bequest given for the congregation's building program. The congregation purchased its rented space, the former building of the Metropolitan Tabernacle, completed in 1932.

== History of the congregation ==
Volunteers and staff with children at the Good Shepherd Mission, 653 East Pender Street, in the 1920s

Church of the Good Shepherd originated c. 1880 as a mission started by priest J. Sheepshanks of the Diocese of New Westminster for Chinese migrants working on the Canadian Pacific Railway. The first Chinese Anglican church in Canada, the Good Shepherd Mission opened in Vancouver in 1892 and by 1912 had an ethnic Chinese priest named George Lim-Yuen. Lim-Yuen was the first Chinese to be ordained in the Anglican Church in Canada. He served at Good Shepherd until his transfer to Vernon, British Columbia, in 1924. In the 1920s, the Good Shepherd Mission operated a programme for women and children, including a kindergarten and night school, under the direction of Hilda Hellaby at 636 E. Pender Street.

Good Shepherd built a church building at 636 Keefer Street in Strathcona in 1935; it was dedicated by Archbishop Adam de Pencier. By 1984, the congregation had grown to 200 families and outgrown the space and moved to the former Danish Lutheran church at 139 E. 19th Avenue. Longtime minister Peter Y.C. Pang, who had joined the church in 1967, presided over the move.

Stephen Leung became rector of Good Shepherd in 1990. In 2002, after the Diocese of New Westminster synod controversially approved the blessing of same-sex unions, Leung joined the Good Shepherd delegates, along with delegates from seven other churches, in walking out of synod in objection. Good Shepherd and other dissenting churches formed a group called the Anglican Communion in New Westminster, declared impaired communion with Bishop Michael Ingham, and requested alternative episcopal oversight—including, eventually, requests for oversight from Global South Anglican primates. Around 2004, Good Shepherd began renting the former building of Metropolitan Tabernacle.

As the Anglican realignment proceeded in Canada, Good Shepherd's 203-member congregation—at that time the largest Chinese Anglican congregation in Canada—voted unanimously to disaffiliate from New Westminster in February 2008. Good Shepherd sought oversight from the Anglican Church of the Southern Cone and joined the Anglican Network in Canada (ANiC). The church was involved in litigation over the ownership of its property; the Supreme Court of British Columbia (a trial court jurisdiction) in 2009 affirmed that the property belonged to the diocese, but the judge awarded a CA$2.2 million ($3 million in 2025) bequest to the local congregation, finding that Daphne Wai-Chun intended the proceeds of her bequest to be applied to the building needs of the local church serving the Chinese community. Good Shepherd was able to use the funds from the bequest toward its $3.4 million ($5 million in 2025) purchase of the former Metropolitan Tabernacle building.

== Building history ==
Metropolitan Tabernacle was a Fundamentalist church. It purchased land at the corner of Columbia and W. 11th in 1929. The church building was completed without debt in 1932.

== Architecture ==
Good Shepherd's building was built with reinforced concrete with a seating capacity of 1,000.
