= Martin Mate =

Canadian Anglican priest (1929–2023)

Martin Mate (12 November 1929 – 28 November 2023) was a Canadian Anglican priest who served as Bishop of Eastern Newfoundland and Labrador from 1980 to 1992.

Born on 12 November 1929, he was educated at the Memorial University of Newfoundland and ordained in 1953. as a curate at the Cathedral of St John the Baptist, St John's, Newfoundland. He held incumbencies at Pushthrough, St. Barbe, Cookshire, Catalina, Bonavista Bay and Pouch Cove before his ordination to the episcopate. Mate died on 28 November 2023, at the age of 94.

== Notes ==
Religious titles
Preceded by Robert Lowder Seaborn	Bishop of Eastern Newfoundland and Labrador; 1980 – 1992	Succeeded by Donald Frederick Harvey
