= Anglican Church of the Good Samaritan =

Anglican church in St. John's, Canada

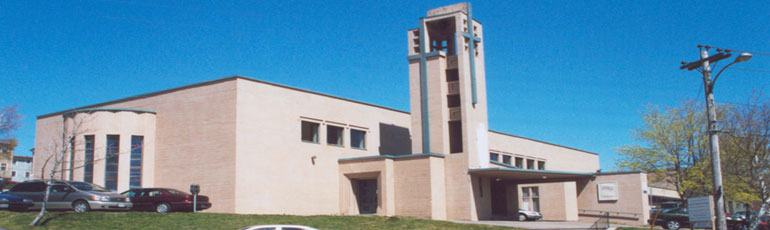
- Anglican Church of the Good Samaritan
- 47°33′31″N 52°43′14″W
- Location: 10 St. Clare Ave., St. John's, Newfoundland and Labrador
- Country: Canada
- Denomination: Anglican Church in North America
- Website: www.churchofthegoodsamaritan.ca

History
- Founded: 2008

Architecture
- Style: Modern
- Years built: 1959

Administration
- Diocese: Canada

Clergy
- Bishop(s): Donald Harvey; Darrell Critch

The Anglican Church of the Good Samaritan is an Anglican church in St. John's, Newfoundland and Labrador, Canada. Founded in 2008, it is a member of the Anglican Diocese of Canada, which separated from the Anglican Church of Canada. Since 2022, Good Samaritan has been home to Packer College, ANiC's diocesan seminary.

== History ==
The Church of the Good Samaritan was founded in 2008 as part of the Anglican realignment. It worshiped at 27 different locations during its first 12 years, but in 2020, the church received an anonymous CAD2.5 million gift that allowed it to purchase the former Anglican Church of St. Michael and All Angels on 10 St. Clare Road in St. John's. The church, built in 1959, had been deconsecrated and used as a fitness center. (One of St. Michael's former rectors was ANiC Bishop Donald Harvey, who later served as an honorary assistant and bishop in residence at Good Samaritan.)

== Packer College ==
Starting in 2022, Good Samaritan's building became the campus for Packer College. Named after J. I. Packer, the college is the official theological seminary of ANiC. It offers a three-year licentiate in theology while its accreditation is pending. Offering residential, in-person learning, Packer College reflects the Anglo-Catholic, evangelical and charismatic traditions within ANiC. Good Samaritan's founding rector, Darrell Critch, was also Packer College's chaplain, and Packer College professor David Smith is an honorary assistant at Good Samaritan. The church building was consecrated and the college formally instituted by Bishop Charlie Masters on the feast of the Holy Cross in September 2022.

== Ministries ==
As the host of Packer College, Good Samaritan conducts daily morning prayer and evensong services, as well as feast day Eucharists, during the school term.

Good Samaritan practices a tithe with its church income, some of which goes to a partnership with Arms of Jesus Children's Mission in Guatemala City. Good Samaritan also supports ANiC church plants in Gander and Bonavista. Honorary assistant priest Marilyn Flower engages in prison ministry to inmates in His Majesty's Penitentiary in St. John's.

Amid a homelessness surge in St. John's, Good Samaritan in 2023 proposed to the city that its parking lot zoning be changed to allow institutional use, including the possibility of converting part of its building and grounds into a 40-bed emergency shelter. On September 27, 2023, the church and provincial government announced that through a partnership of NL Housing and the Anglican Church of the Good Samaritan, The Safe Haven Shelter would serve as a new emergency shelter and warming centre. The Safe Haven Shelter is a 40-bed emergency shelter with an additional 30 person warming shelter in the winter months.
