= St. Peter & St. Paul's Anglican Church (Ottawa) =

St. Peter's & St. Paul's Anglican Church
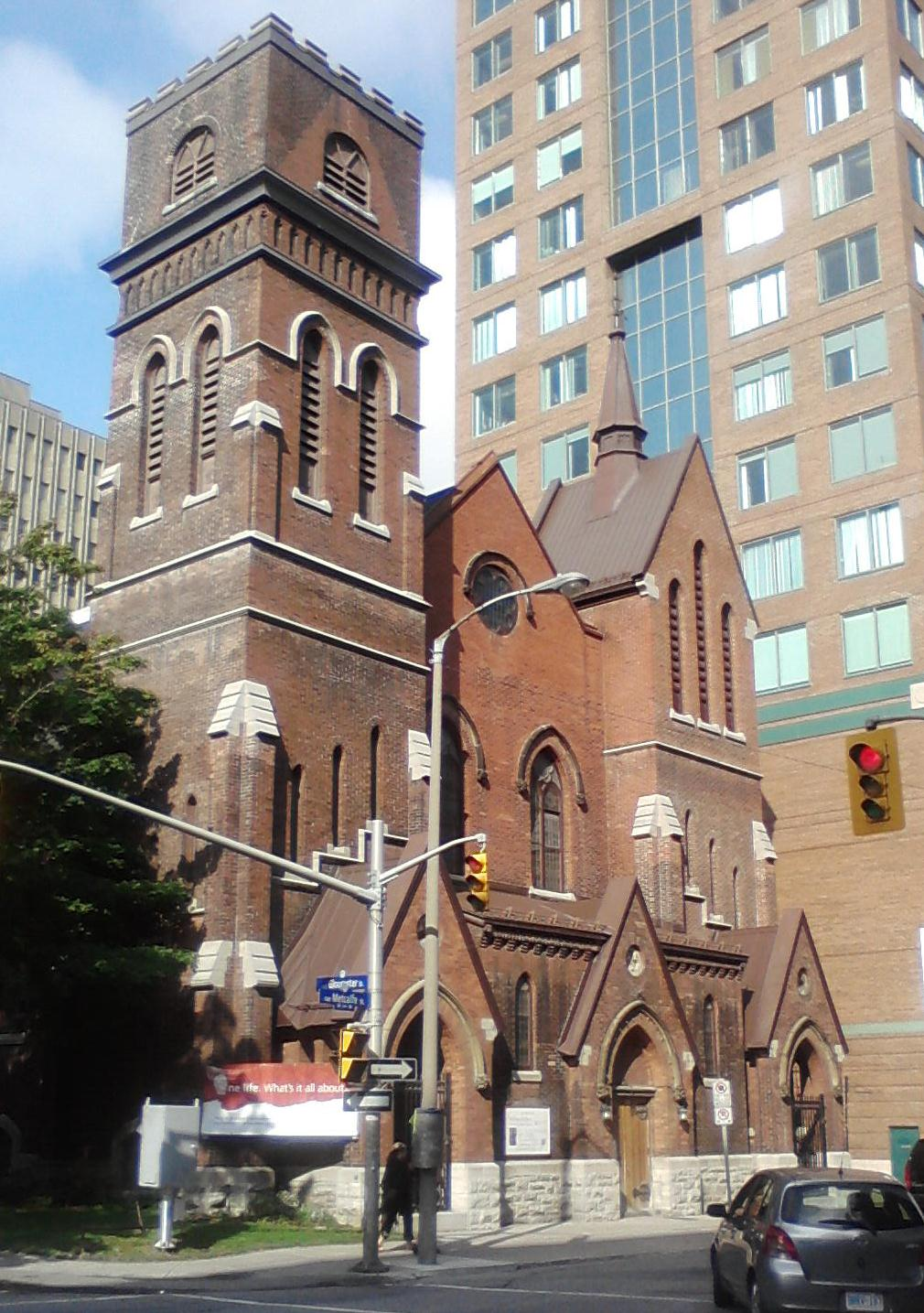
- St. Peter and St. Paul's Anglican Church (formerly St. George's Anglican Church), Metcalfe St.
- St. Peter's & St. Paul's Anglican Church
- 45.41961°N 75.69497°W
- Location: 152 Metcalfe Street; Ottawa, Ontario; K2P 1N9
- Denomination: Anglican Church in North America
- Website: peterpaulottawa.com

History
- Former name: St. George's Church
- Dedication: St. Peter and St. Paul

Administration
- Diocese: Canada

Clergy
- Rector: Rev Dr Ben Vanderheide

St. Peter's & St. Paul's Anglican Church, formerly known as St. George's, is an Anglican church in the downtown core of Ottawa, Ontario, Canada.

== History ==
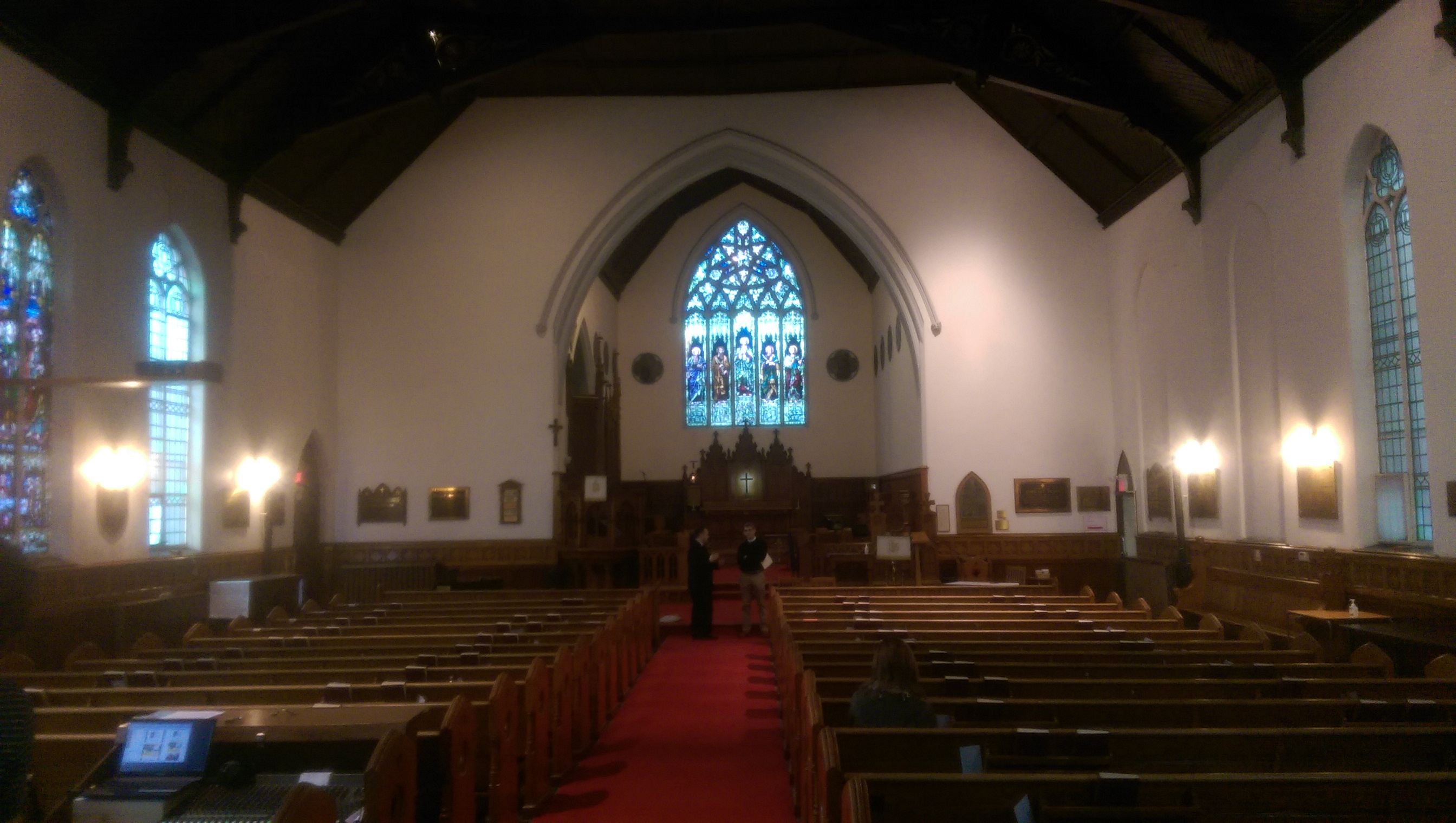
Interior of St. Peter & St. Paul's Anglican Church

St. George's was built as a Methodist Episcopal church at the corner of Metcalfe and Gloucester and was purchased in 1885 as an Anglican church. The first Anglican service in the church was held on May 31, 1885. The main spire was set ablaze after being struck by lightning twice on June 28, 1898. In 1906, the congregation erected a parish hall. Bishop John Charles Roper consecrated the church on October 14, 1928. St. George's purchased a rectory around 1929. St. George's marked their centennial with renovations to the church and parish hall in 1985.

A memorial is dedicated to members of the church who died or served during the Great War. A stained glass window was also erected to the parish dead of the Great War."First World War stained glass memorial: St Peter & St Paul's Anglican Church, Ottawa: Memorial 35059-115 Ottawa, ON". National Inventory of Canadian Military Memorials. Veterans Affairs Canada. Memorial plaques are dedicated to the memory of Captain Edward T. Mennie, M.C. and Corporal Garnet Wynne Domsley who gave their lives during the First World War. Another memorial is dedicated to members of the church who died or served during the Second World War. A memorial plaque is dedicated to the memory of Donald Lawrence Moulds who gave his life during the Second World War.

In 2008, the church joined the Anglican Network in Canada and was renamed St. Peter's & St. Paul's Anglican Church.

== Fonds ==
Fonds of St. George's congregation in Ottawa, Ontario include parish registers, 1885-1988, vestry records, 1885-1986, service registers, 1885-1986, records of committees and organizations, financial records, property records, special services and events material, correspondence, historiography, service bulletins, newsclippings, a list of parishioners, special collections, and photographs.
