= Yvonne Williams =

Canadian stained glass artist

- Born: 1901; Port of Spain, Trinidad
- Died: 1997 (aged 95–96); Parry Sound, Canada
- Known for: Stained glass artist
- Awards: RAIC Allied Arts Medal (1957)

Yvonne Williams RCA (1901–1997) was a stained glass artist, known for her design and creation of stained glass windows in Canada, including the windows in St. John's Shaughnessy in Vancouver, Chalmers United Church in Guelph, Ontario and St. Michael & All Angels Church in Toronto.

== Biography ==
Williams was born to Canadian parents in Port of Spain, Trinidad. In 1918, the family returned to Canada.

Williams enrolled in the Ontario School of Art in 1922. There she studied sculpture then painting, studying under Arthur Lismer, Frederick Varley and J. E. H. MacDonald. She changed her focus to glass and fine art metal, staying an additional year at university to study under Edith Grace Coombs. In 1928, she began an apprenticeship at Charles Jay Connick's studio in Boston, Massachusetts. In 1936, she travelled to France to study the stained glass at Chartres.

Returning to Toronto, Williams opened a studio in 1930, located on Cariboo Avenue in North Toronto in a house she rented from Arthur Lismer. The studio was in operation for almost 30 years. The studio received over four hundred commissions across Canada for both public and private spaces. Images by Williams were selected for the 1976 Canadian Yuletide 20 cent stamp and the 1997 Canadian Yuletide 52 cent stamp. Her career spanned almost 50 years at a time when it was unique for a woman to enter the field of stained glass. An interview with Williams about her career is available in Library and Archives Canada under Joan Murray fonds, R4917.

Williams was a member of Royal Architectural Institute of Canada (RAIC) and the Royal Canadian Academy of Arts.

She died in 1997 in Parry Sound, Ontario. She had previously donated lakefront land for a public park on Mill Lake, now known as Yvonne Williams Park.
