= Diocese of Eastern Newfoundland and Labrador =

Diocese of the Anglican Church in Canada

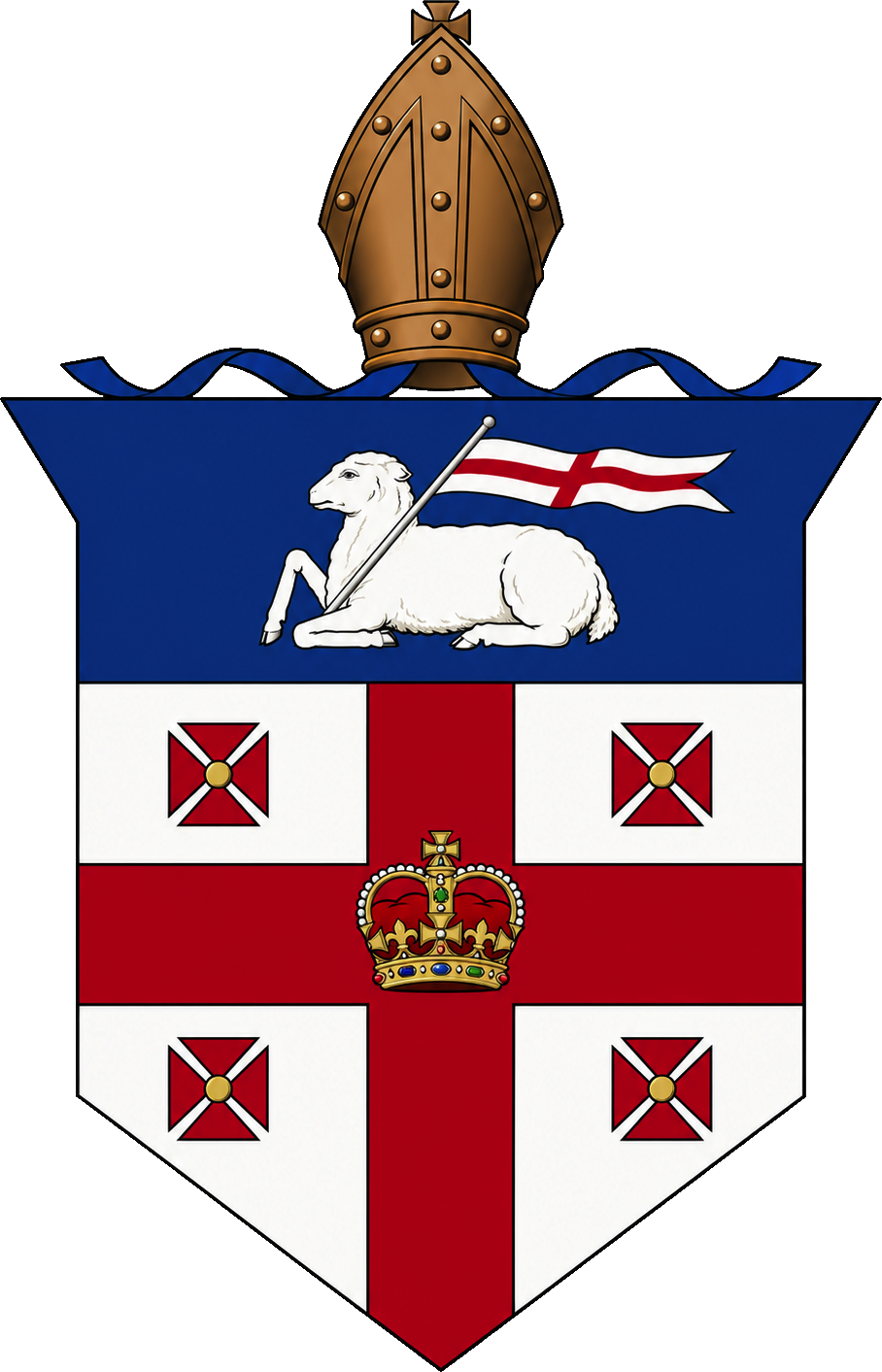

Location
- Ecclesiastical province: Canada

Statistics
- Parishes: 39 (2022)
- Members: 21,053 (2022)

Information
- Rite: Anglican
- Cathedral: Cathedral of St. John the Baptist, St. John's

Current leadership
- Bishop: Samuel Rose

Map
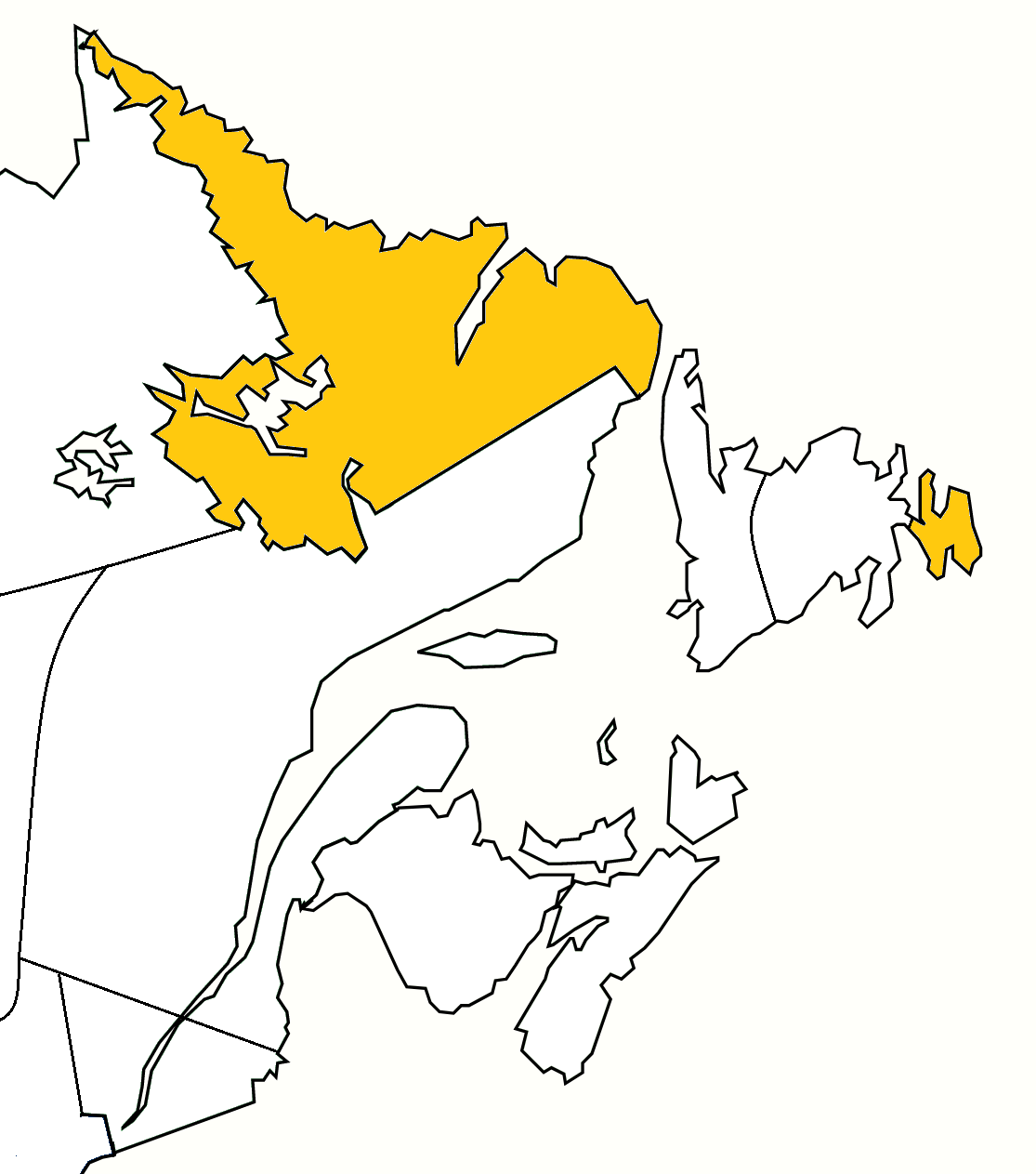
- Boundaries of the diocese within the Ecclesiastical Province of Canada

Website
- anglicanenl.net

The Anglican Diocese of Eastern Newfoundland and Labrador is one of seven dioceses of the Ecclesiastical Province of Canada in the Anglican Church of Canada. As of 2012 the diocese had 50,000 members in 81 congregations organised in 35 parishes. The most widely spread parish has thirteen congregations.

== History ==
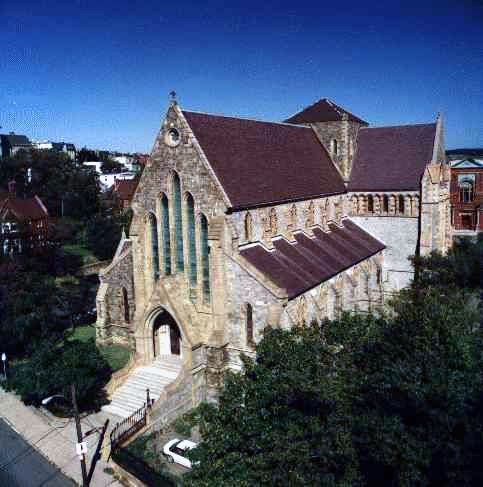
Cathedral of St. John the Baptist, the mother church for Anglicans in Newfoundland and Labrador

In 1976 the Diocese of Newfoundland was reorganised and three autonomous dioceses were created: Eastern Newfoundland and Labrador, Central Newfoundland, and Western Newfoundland.

As of 2019, this Diocese allows clergy to officiate at same-sex marriages.

== Bishops of Eastern Newfoundland and Labrador ==
- Robert Seaborn, 1965–1980 (1965–1976 as Bishop of Newfoundland); Metropolitan of Canada, 1975–1980
- Martin Mate, 1980–1992
- Don Harvey, 1993–2004
- Cyrus Pitman, 2004–2013
- Geoffrey Peddle, 2014–2020
- Samuel Rose, 2020–present

== Parishes ==
| Parish | Location |
|---|---|
| Cathedral of St. John the Baptist | St. John's |
| All Saints, CBS | Conception Bay South |
| The Ascension | Mount Pearl |
| Bay de Verde | Bay de Verde |
| Bay Roberts/Foley's Point | Bay Roberts |
| St. Cyprian & St. Mary | Wabana |
| St. James | Carbonear |
| St. Mark’s | Churchill Falls |
| The Good Shepherd | Mount Pearl |
| St. Paul's | Harbour Grace |
| Heart's Content | Heart's Content |
| The Epiphany | Heart's Delight-Islington |
| The Holy Innocents Paradise | Paradise |
| Holy Cross | Norman's Cove-Long Cove |
| Holy Spirit | Hodge's Cove |
| The Holy Trinity | Whitbourne |
| Labrador West | Labrador City |
| St. Andrew's | Happy Valley-Goose Bay |
| The Living Water | Arnold's Cove |
| New Hope | Goulds |
| Petty Harbour/Bay Bulls/Aquaforte | Paradise |
| St. Luke's | Port de Grave, Newfoundland |
| All Saints | Pouch Cove |
| The Resurrection | South River |
| St. Peter's | Cartwright |
| Holy Redeemer | Spaniard's Bay |
| St. Augustine | St. John's |
| St. John the Evangelist, C.B.S | Conception Bay South |
| St. Lawrence | Portugal Cove–St. Philip's |
| St. Mark the Evangelist | St. John's |
| St. Mark, Shearstown/Butlerville | Shearstown |
| St. Mary the Virgin | St. John's |
| St. Philips, Coady’s Road | Portugal Cove–St. Philip's |
| St. Thomas | St. John's |
| St. Timothy, Rigolet | Rigolet |
| St. Nicholas | Torbay |
| St. Peter's | Upper Island Cove |

== Former Schools ==
- Bishop Feild College
