= Trevor Walters (bishop) =

Canadian Anglican bishop

The Right Reverend Trevor Walters
- Suffragan Bishop of the Anglican Network in Canada
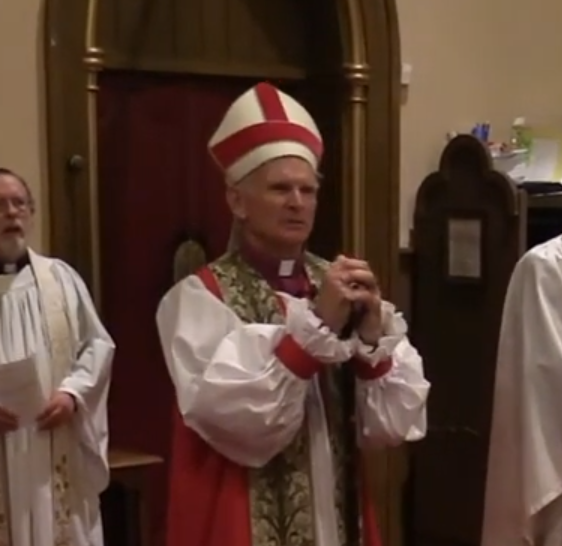
- Bishop Trevor Walters presides at the institution of the Rev. Rob Szo as rector of Church of Our Lord.
- Church: Anglican Church in North America
- Diocese: Canada
- In office: 2009–2022
- Other post(s): Area Bishop, Western Canada

Orders
- Consecration: November 13, 2009 by Robert Duncan

Trevor Walters is a British-born Canadian bishop of the Anglican Church in North America. From 2009 to 2021, he was suffragan bishop with responsibility for western Canada in the Anglican Network in Canada. As a priest in the Diocese of New Westminster in the early 2000s, Walters played a major role in the Anglican realignment in Canada.

== Early life, education and family ==
Walters was born in London and raised in a Baptist church. He studied at the University of London and taught high school in Bermondsey before pursuing a call to ordained ministry. Walters joined the Barnabas Fellowship, a charismatic community, and studied for his divinity degree at Salisbury and Wells Theological College. Walters married Julie and they had three children.

He was ordained to the priesthood in the Diocese of Salisbury in 1978 and sent to St. Stephen's Anglican Church in Calgary to serve his curacy there. He later served as chaplain at the University of Calgary and as executive director of the Entheos Retreat and Conference Centre in Calgary, before receiving a call as rector of St. Matthew's Anglican Church in Abbotsford, British Columbia. Walters also received a D.Min. during his time in Alberta.

== Anglican realignment ==
As a priest in Abbotsford, Walters became involved in theological and ecclesiastical controversies in the Diocese of New Westminster. In 1999, to celebrate St. Matthew's upcoming 2000 centennial, Walters invited South East Asia Archbishop Moses Tay to preach and celebrate at the church. However, New Westminster Bishop Michael Ingham refused to grant him permission to officiate in the diocese. Ingham cited said he did not “want to see any episcopal ministry exercised here which might disturb my efforts to create a climate of dialogue and mutual listening among members of the diocese" and cited concerns about what he called Tay's “aggressively anti-homosexual stance” and comments Tay had made a decade prior during a visit to British Columbia about totem poles in Stanley Park representing "evil spirits" that needed to be exorcised. Walters said at the time that the decision had brought "great sadness and frustration."

In 2002, after the New Westminster synod controversially approved the blessing of same-sex unions, Walters joined the St. Matthew's delegates, along with delegates from seven other churches, in walking out of synod in objection. Walters and the other dissenting leaders formed a group called the Anglican Communion in New Westminster (ACiNW) and declared impaired communion with Ingham.

The synod decision became a major flashpoint in the Anglican realignment. Coming four years after the 1998 Lambeth Conference passed Resolution 1.10 (stating that it "cannot advise the legitimising or blessing of same-sex unions nor ordaining those involved in same gender unions") and Resolution 3.6 (asking the Primates Meeting to "include among its responsibilities . . . intervention in cases of exceptional emergency which are incapable of internal resolution in provinces"), Walters, as chairman of the ACiNW, asked Archbishop of Canterbury George Carey to intervene by providing alternative episcopal oversight. While Carey, who opposed same-sex blessings, responded that the New Westminster synod decision "saddens me deeply" and left him "no doubt that the unity of the Communion is threatened by your Synod's decision," he told Walters that he was "alarmed by the statements of those who appear to be determined to look elsewhere for episcopal oversight in place of the extended episcopal support which Bishop Ingham has offered" and said he doubted that Resolution 3.6 "is directly relevant to the problems you face."

After the synod, Walters in 2003 asked the primate of Canada to appoint William Anderson, the traditionalist bishop of Caledonia, to “provide true episcopal oversight on an interim basis" after an offer of oversight from Terry Buckle, bishop of the Yukon, was withdrawn under threat of discipline from the metropolitan archbishop of British Columbia and the Yukon. Walters also led efforts among the dissenting B.C. churches to develop relationships with primates of Anglican provinces in the Global South. Ultimately, the Anglican Church of the Southern Cone would agree to provide primatial oversight for traditionalist Anglican churches in Canada as an interim step to creating what Walters called "a parallel province in North America."

In May 2008, Walters relinquished his orders in the Anglican Church of Canada, and St. Matthew's sought oversight from the Southern Cone and joined the newly formed Anglican Network in Canada. The church was involved in litigation over the ownership of its property; the Supreme Court of British Columbia (a trial court jurisdiction) in 2009 affirmed that the property belonged to the Diocese of New Westminster. The higher B.C. Court of Appeal affirmed the ruling, and the Supreme Court of Canada declined to hear the case, resulting in St. Matthew's leaving its prior building.

== Episcopacy ==
On November 13, 2009, Walters was consecrated a bishop for ANiC in St. Catharines, Ontario, alongside Charlie Masters and Stephen Leung. He served as area bishop for western Canada and as a priest associate at St. Matthew's.

He also served the Anglican Church in North America and the Anglican Province of America as an ecclesiastical mediator, serving as chair of the ACNA's mediating committee and as a circuit civil mediator for the Supreme Court of Florida. In 2015, he mediated dialogue between the ACNA and the Anglican Mission in the Americas following the breakdown of that partnership, and he has mediated conflicts in the Via Apostolica missionary district. Walters worked as a therapist focusing on the mental health of clergy experiencing burnout.

Walters also participated in oversight of the Reformed Episcopal Church's Missionary Diocese of Cuba, supporting partnerships between ANiC churches and Cuban congregations and co-consecrating Willians Mendez Suarez as a bishop in 2014.

== Later life ==
Walters' first wife, Julie, died in 2007. He was remarried to Dede in 2011, and they have three grandchildren. Walters retired in 2022 from active episcopal ministry. He continues to serve as bishop of mediation in ANiC and served as a clergy counselor in the Diocese of Churches for the Sake of Others during Todd Hunter's 2022 sabbatical.

== Bibliography ==
- Walters, Trevor; Stanley, Jim (2016). EAS Syndrome: Healing Burnout in Adults Lacking Parental Affirmation. Huntington Beach, California: Anglican House Publishers. ISBN 9780997016703.
- Walters, Trevor (2019). The Power of Christian Mediation: Realizing Spirit-Led Outcomes. Huntington Beach, California: Anglican House Publishers. ISBN 9780999391082.
