= Anglican Diocese of Canada =

Anglican realignment diocese in Canada

Anglican Diocese of Canada Diocèse anglican du Canada

Location
- Ecclesiastical province: Anglican Church in North America

Statistics
- Parishes: 68 (2025)
- Members: 5,122 (2025)

Information
- Rite: Anglican

Current leadership
- Diocesan bishop: Dan Gifford
- Suffragans: Mike Stewart; Stephen Leung

Website
- dioceseofcanada.ca

The Anglican Diocese of Canada (formerly known as the Anglican Network in Canada, or ANiC) is the Canadian diocese of the Anglican Church in North America. Established in 2005, prior to becoming a founding diocese of the ACNA, it originated as a group of congregations and clergy that had left the Anglican Church of Canada to affiliate temporarily with the Anglican Province of the Southern Cone, a province of the Anglican Communion. In 2024, the diocese formally adopted its current name.

== Structure ==
The Anglican Network in Canada aimed to "remain faithful to established Christian doctrine and Anglican practice" and represent what it regards as orthodox Anglicanism in Canada. ANiC is a major Canadian constituent of the Anglican realignment movement. The irregular nature of ANiC makes it the geographically largest Anglican diocese in the world, covering the entire territory of Canada and a small pocket in the northeastern United States, in Massachusetts and Vermont.

== Beliefs ==
The stated mission of the Anglican Network in Canada is to "Build Biblically faithful, Gospel sharing, Anglican Churches". The network desires to build new churches and expand existing churches that it believes will be fully Anglican, biblically faithful, evangelizing and discipling.

The Anglican Network upholds what it believes to be the historical, biblical and traditional Christian beliefs found in the Anglican tradition pertaining to the Holy Trinity, sexuality, and authority of Christian scripture. ANiC also affirms the Chicago-Lambeth Quadrilateral of 1886/1888 and the Jerusalem Declaration of GAFCON 2008. While women can be ordained as deacons or priests they cannot be ordained as bishops. The diocese does not bless same-sex unions or marriages. They also oppose abortion and euthanasia.

== Worship style ==
Most churches within the Anglican Diocese of Canada worship based on the liturgy and practices of the Book of Common Prayer 2019, developed by the Anglican Church in North America. Most parishes celebrate Holy Communion (Eucharist) at least once a week, with many churches holding multiple services.

Within ANiC there exists a wide diversity of worship and music styles. There are some churches in ANiC which identify as high church and Anglo-Catholic, while there are churches at the other end of the spectrum which identify as low church and evangelical and some which would be described as more charismatic. Music in their services can very from hymns and songs led by organ, piano, guitars, or full orchestras and choirs.

== Leadership ==
Since 2007, the diocesan bishops (previously called "moderator bishops") of ANIC have been:

1. Don Harvey (2007–2014)
2. Charlie Masters (2014–2022)
3. Dan Gifford (2022–present)

ANIC's suffragan bishops have included Masters, who served as area bishop for eastern Canada from 2009 until his election as diocesan bishop in 2014; Trevor Walters, who was area bishop for western Canada from 2009 to 2022; Stephen Leung, who since 2009 has been suffragan bishop for Asian and multicultural ministry; and Mike Stewart, who has been area bishop for western Canada since 2024.

ANIC is also canonical residence for several retired bishops of the Anglican Church of Canada, including William Anderson of Caledonia, Terry Buckle of Yukon, Ronald Ferris of Yukon and Algoma and ANIC assisting bishop for church planting, and Malcolm Harding of Brandon.

One prominent member of the Anglican Network in Canada was J. I. Packer, who was a leading theologian in the Anglican and North American evangelical world. He was a longtime honorary assistant at St. John's Vancouver and a professor of theology at Regent College. During his lifetime, Packer was canon theologian emeritus of ANIC.

== Parishes ==
In 2025, the Diocese of Canada reported 68 congregations (down 6% from 2022) and 5,122 members (down 21% from 2022), with an average Sunday attendance of 4,729 (up 38% from 2022). Notable parishes in the diocese include:

Church	Image	City	Year founded	Year completed	Notes
St. Bede's Anglican Church		Kinosota, Manitoba	1842	1922	
Church of Our Lord		Victoria, British Columbia	1875	1975	Previously a member of the Reformed Episcopal Church
Church of the Good Shepherd		Vancouver, British Columbia	1880	1932	First and largest Chinese Anglican church in Canada
St. Peter and St. Paul's Anglican Church		Ottawa, Ontario	1885	pre-1885	Previously St. George's Anglican Church
Anglican Church of the Good Samaritan		St. John's, Newfoundland	2008	1959	
St. John's Vancouver		Vancouver, British Columbia	2011	N/A	Separated from St. John's Shaughnessy

== Ecumenical relations ==
=== Reaction to Roman Catholic personal ordinariates ===
In October 2009, ANiC's leadership reacted to the Roman Catholic Church's proposed creation of personal ordinariates for disaffected traditionalist Anglicans by saying that this provision would probably not have a great impact on its laity and clergy, who are satisfied with the Anglican realignment movement. In June 2013, at least one priest from the ANIC denomination has accepted the offer to become a Catholic priest. Furthermore, Bishop Don Harvey stated that "Apart from being an intrusion at the very highest levels of one major church into the internal affairs of another, under the guise of being ecumenical, this invitation offers very little that is new."

=== Relations with other churches ===
ANiC is a member of the Evangelical Fellowship of Canada. ANiC has established ecumenical contacts with the Lutheran Church-Canada. It is also has been involved in ecumenical dialogue with other Lutheran and Christian church bodies as part of the ACNA.

== See also ==
- Anglican Essentials Canada
