= Blanche Gates =

Canadian Anglican liturgist

Blanche Gates CWA ODBC
- Born: Blanche Kate Gregory; May 7, 1918
- Died: May 9, 2023 (aged 105); Nanaimo, British Columbia, Canada
- Notable work: Book of Alternative Services (1985)

Blanche Kate Gates (7 May 1918 – 9 May 2023), née Gregory, was a Canadian Anglican liturgist. As a layperson, Gates was active throughout her life in the councils of the Anglican Church of Canada (ACC). Active in the governance church in an era before the ordination of women as priests and bishops, Gates was recognized during her lifetime as a pioneer for laywomen in the church. She was also a major contributor to the development of the 1985 Book of Alternative Services, a liturgical book designed to update the Canadian Book of Common Prayer that has largely supplanted it as the standard worship text across the ACC.

== Early life ==
Gates was born to Frank and Kate Gregory of Surrey, England. Blanche Gregory married Reginald Gates and had three sons. Living in the Nanaimo area, Blanche Gates became active as a volunteer in her local Anglican congregation's altar guild and then at the diocesan level, where she was president of Anglican Church Women in the Diocese of British Columbia. As a quilter and seamstress, throughout her life she produced altar cloths, vestments and banners for churches in the diocese.

== Liturgical reform ==
In the early 1980s, Gates was appointed to the ACC's Doctrine and Worship Committee, in which capacity she advocated for the committee to adopt a revised prayer book that reflected the ascendant Liturgical Movement of the late 20th century. According to the ACC, Gates delved into "liturgical texts and commentaries, including experimental liturgical texts developed in the 1960s and 70s, the 1979 Book of Common Prayer published in the US, and the Roman Missal as revised by Pope Paul VI." Gates' work on the committee resulted in the production of the Book of Alternative Services, with Gates' influence especially strong on the BAS funeral rite. As a member of the General Synod, Gates seconded the motion officially adopting the BAS for use in Anglican churches in 1985. Despite its name, the BAS became the primary text for worship in Canadian Anglican churches.

Gates was an advocate for the role of women in the ACC. "They had no voice. That was a problem for me right from the very start," she later said. "I felt women should be able to say something." She described the liturgical modernization represented by the BAS as "an opportunity for women coming into the church ... to speak in the language of the day."

== Awards ==
In 2018, at 100, Gates was recognized by Primate of Canada Fred Hiltz as Companion of the Worship Arts (CWA), an honor given once every two years to one Anglican Church of Canada member and one Evangelical Lutheran Church in Canada member for substantial contributions to the worshiping lives of the two churches.

Also in 2018, Gates was recognized as an Officer of the Order of the Diocese of British Columbia (ODBC), an honor for laity who have contributed significantly to the life of the broader church.

== Later life ==
Gates died two days after her 105th birthday in 2023. At the time of her death, she had three sons, eight grandchildren, 13 great-grandchildren and a great great grandchild.
