= Church of the Holy Saviour =

Church of the Holy Savio(u)r, or Holy Savio(u)r Church may refer to:

- Church of the Holy Savior (Grahovac), Montenegro
- Church of the Holy Saviour, Istanbul, Turkey
- Church of the Holy Saviour, Kraków, Poland
- Church of the Holy Saviour, Nesebar, Bulgaria
- Church of the Holy Saviour, Prizren, Kosovo
- Church of the Holy Savior (Topla), Montenegro
- Holy Saviour Church, Arrah, India
- Holy Saviour's Church, Gyumri, Armenia
- Nagano Holy Saviour Church, Japan

== See also ==
- Church of San Salvador
