= Margaret Young (missionary) =

Canadian missionary

Margaret Majora Young (1855 – 1940, in Japanese: マーガレット・ヤング) was a Canadian missionary to Nagoya, Japan. She dedicated her life to the education of women there, and laid the foundation of St. Mary's College, Nagoya.

== Birth and education ==
Margaret Young was born in Vienna, Ontario, Canada in 1855. She was the third daughter of the six siblings.

After studying at the Hamilton Normal School, she started to work in 1890 at a public kindergarten in Elma, Ontario, where she was exposed to Friedrich Fröbel's early childhood education method and practice.

== Missionary in Japan ==
In 1895, she was sent to Japan as a missionary of the Anglican Church of Canada, and arrived in Nagoya, Japan's third largest city, where J. Robinson and his wife had begun their missionary work in 1888. In 1898 she started education of child care workers at her own home, with one student. In 1899, she established Ryujo Kindergarten in Higashi-ku, Nagoya. (Ryujo, meaning the willow castle, is one of the nicknames of Nagoya, well known for its magnificent castle.) In 1903, she started to emphasize education of mothers, by establishing the “Mothers' Association” at the kindergarten.

In 1910, the child care worker training facility became the Ryujo child care workers' training school. In 1924, it was officially renamed the Ryujo Child Care Training School. Based on this school, Ryujo Women's Junior College was established after WWII, in 1953, in Showa-ku, Nagoya, across the street from which now stands St. Matthew's, the diocesan cathedral of the Chubu Diocese. In 1995, the women's college became Nagoya Ryujo Junior College, its English name being St. Mary's College, Nagoya.

In 1922, Margaret Young went back to Canada with his adopted son, Masataka Shimizu, but in 1936 she returned to Japan for permanent residence. In 1939, she left Japan because of her sister's illness, but returned in the same year.

Margaret died in Nagoya in 1940. She was 84 years old. Her funeral service was conducted at St. John's Church, Nagoya. She was buried at the Yagoto Cemetery, Nagoya.

Margaret's motto was "By Love Serve" (from Galatians 5:13), which is now in the insignia of the college.

== See also ==
- Chubu Diocese, Anglican Church in Japan
- J. G. Waller, another missionary from Ontario to Chubu Diocese, Anglican Church in Japan
- Missionary Society of the Church of England in Canada (ja:カナダ聖公会伝道協会)
