= Solemn Declaration of 1893 =

Statement by the Anglican Church of Canada

The Solemn Declaration of 1893 is a statement that was adopted by the first General Synod of the Anglican Church of Canada (then called The Church of England in Canada) held in 1893. It is a statement that has appeared in the opening pages of each Canadian edition of the Book of Common Prayer as well as being a part of the Declaration of Principles in the Handbook of the General Synod of the Anglican Church of Canada.

== Origin and purpose ==
Until the 1830s, the Anglican church in Canada was synonymous with the Church of England: bishops were appointed and priests supplied by the church in England, and funding for the church came from the British Parliament. The first Canadian synods were established in the 1850s, giving the Canadian church a degree of self-government. As a result of the Privy Council decision of Long v. Gray in 1861, all Anglican churches in colonies of the British Empire became self-governing.

At a time when the Anglican Church of Canada was given increasing autonomy, the purpose of the Solemn Declaration was to define the way in which the Anglican Church of Canada saw itself remaining in communion with the Church of England throughout the world (the Anglican Communion) and the wider One Holy Catholic and Apostolic Church (the Church).

== Wording ==
In the Name of the Father, and of the Son, and of the Holy Ghost, Amen.

We, the Bishops, together with the Delegates from the Clergy and Laity of the Church of England in the Dominion of Canada, now assembled in the first General Synod, hereby make the following Solemn Declaration:

We declare this Church to be, and desire that it shall continue, in full communion with the Church of England throughout the world, as an integral portion of the one Body of Christ composed of Churches which, united under the One Divine Head and in the fellowship of the one Holy Catholic and Apostolic Church, hold the one Faith revealed in Holy Writ, and defined in the Creeds as maintained by the undivided primitive Church in the undisputed Ecumenical Councils; receive the same Canonical Scriptures of the Old and New Testaments, as containing all things necessary to salvation; teach the same Word of God; partake of the same Divinely ordained Sacraments, through the ministry of the same Apostolic Orders, and worship one God and Father through the same Lord Jesus Christ by the same Holy and Divine Spirit Who is given to them that believe to guide them into all truth.

And we are determined by the help of God to hold and maintain the Doctrine, Sacraments and Discipline of Christ as the Lord hath commanded in His Holy Word, and as the Church of England hath received and set forth the same in “The Book of Common Prayer and Administration of the Sacraments and other Rites and Ceremonies of the Church, according to the Use of the Church of England; together with the Psalter or Psalms of David pointed as they are to be sung or said in churches; and the Form and Manner of Making, Ordaining, and Consecrating of Bishops, Priests and Deacons;” and in the Thirty-nine Articles of Religion; and to transmit the same unimpaired to our posterity.

== Current relevance ==
According to the Declaration of Principles, the General Synod of the Anglican Church of Canada has authority to define doctrine that is "in harmony with the Solemn Declaration". There is some controversy in the modern Anglican Church of Canada as to whether this test is passed by recent proposals such as the blessing of same-sex unions or whether the Solemn Declaration has any relevance in the discussion at all.
