= St. Mary's College, Nagoya =

Coordinates: 35°8′47.5″N 136°55′56.6″E

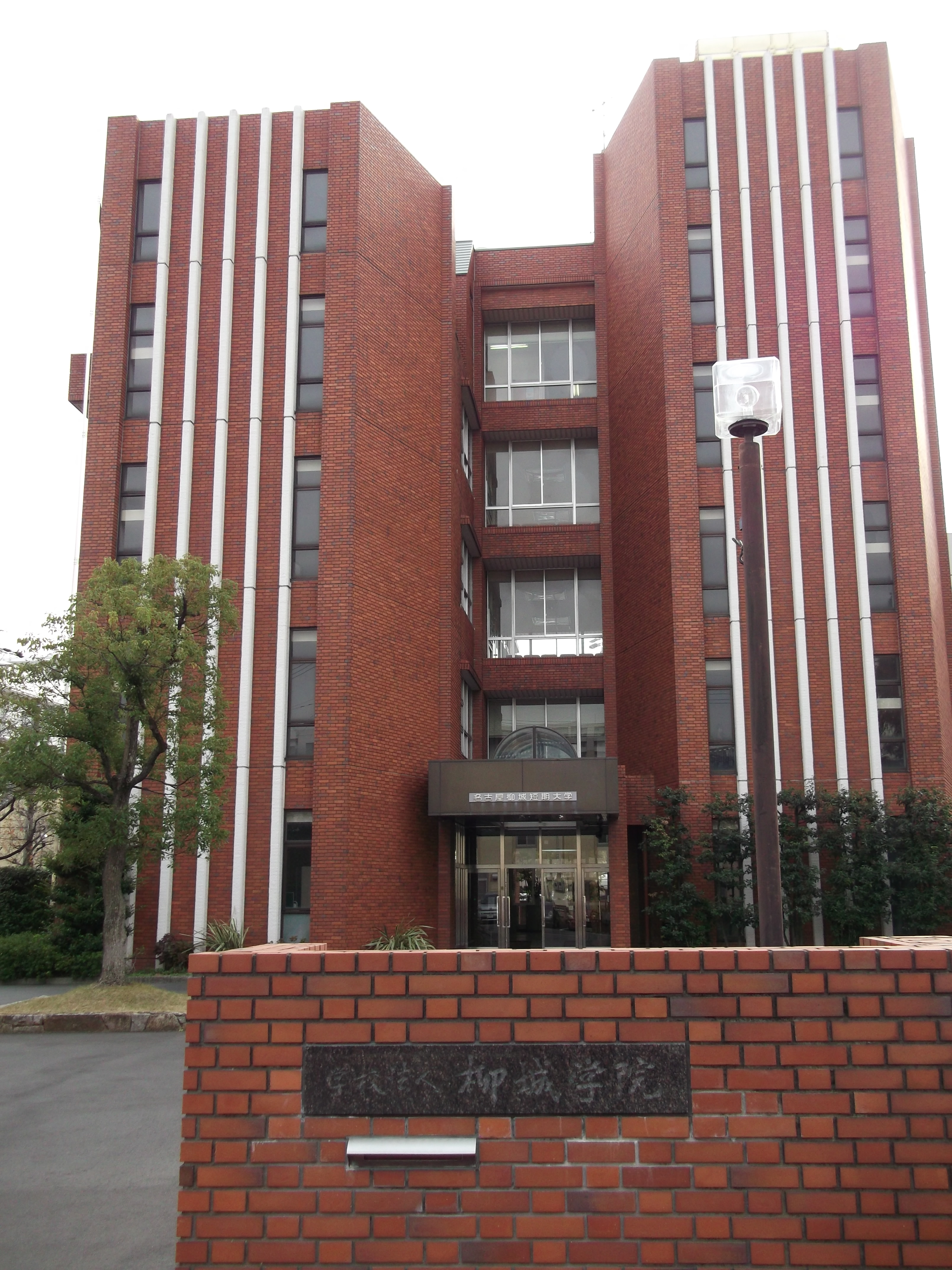
The Main Entrance to St. Mary's College, Nagoya

St. Mary’s College, Nagoya (名古屋柳城短期大学, Nagoya ryūjyō tanki daigaku) is a private junior college in Showa-ku, Nagoya, Aichi Prefecture, Japan, established in 1953. The predecessor of the school was founded in 1898, when Margaret Young (1855-1940), a missionary from Anglican Church of Canada, started a school for child care women.
