= Delva =

Delva is a surname. Notable people with the surname include:

- Anaïs Delva (born 1986), French singer and actress
- Melanie Delva (fl. 2005–2019), Canadian religious archivist
- Norman Delva (born 1969), Guatemalan footballer

== See also ==
- Delver, 2018 video game
