= Book of Common Prayer (1962) =

Liturgical book of the Anglican Church of Canada

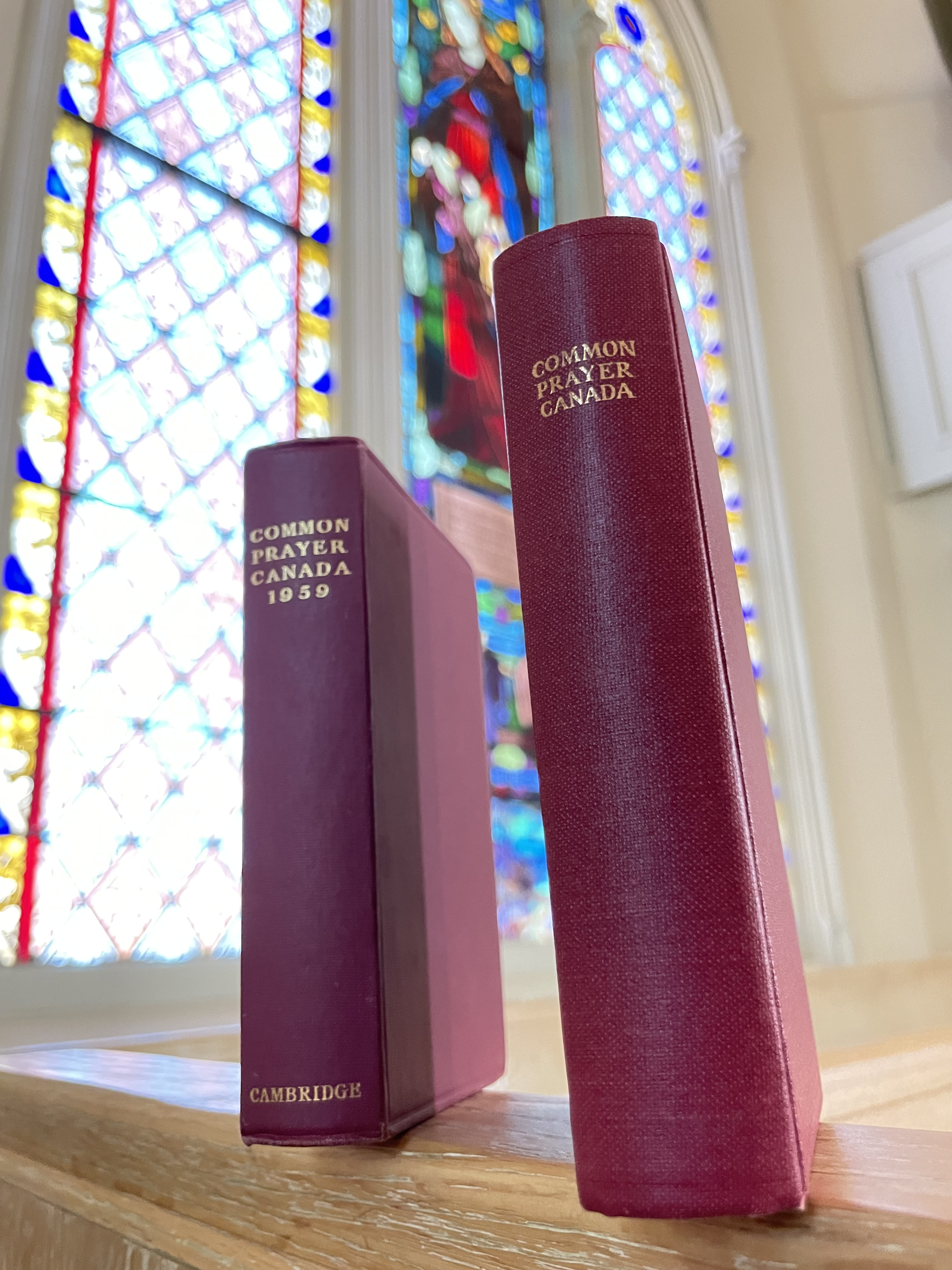
The 1959 and 1962 editions of the Anglican Church of Canada's Book of Common Prayer

The 1962 Book of Common Prayer (Note: The full title provided in the 1962 edition, following prayer book tradition, is The Book of Common Prayer and Administration of the Sacraments and Other Rites and Ceremonies of The Church According to the Use of The Anglican Church of Canada Together with The Psalter as it is Appointed to be Said or Sung in Church and the Form and Manner of Making Ordaining and Consecrating of Bishops Priests and Deacons.) is an authorized liturgical book of the Anglican Church of Canada. The 1962 prayer book is often also considered the 1959 prayer book, in reference to the year the revision was first approved for an "indefinite period" of use beginning in 1960. The 1962 edition follows from the same tradition of other versions of the Book of Common Prayer used by the churches within the Anglican Communion and Anglicanism generally. It contains both the Eucharistic liturgy and Daily Office, as well as additional public liturgies and personal devotions. The second major revision of the Book of Common Prayer of the Anglican Church of Canada, the 1962 Book of Common Prayer succeeded the 1918 edition, which itself had replaced the Church of England's 1662 prayer book. While supplanted by the 1985 Book of Alternative Services as the Anglican Church of Canada's primary Sunday service book, the 1962 prayer book continues to see usage.

== Background ==
Following the English Reformation and the separation of the Church of England from the Catholic Church, the liturgies of what became Anglicanism were transcribed into English. The first such production was the 1549 Book of Common Prayer, traditionally considered to be work of Thomas Cranmer, which replaced both the missals and breviaries of Catholic usage. Among these liturgies were the Communion service and canonical hours of Matins and Evening Prayer, with the addition of the Ordinal containing the form for the consecration of bishops, priests, and deacons in 1550. Under Edward VI, the 1552 Book of Common Prayer incorporated more radically Protestant reforms, a process that continued with 1559 edition approved under Elizabeth I. The 1559 edition was for some time the second-most diffuse book in England, only behind the Bible, through an act of Parliament that mandated its presence in each parish church across the country.

== Prayer book in Canada ==
The first Church of England liturgy in what is now Canada was a 1578 Holy Communion celebrated by a "Maister Wolfall" on Kodlunarn Island, Frobisher Bay, present day Nunavut, during the voyage of Martin Frobisher to the Arctic. This was most probably said according to the 1559 prayer book.

The entirety of Canadian New France was seized from the Kingdom of France by Great Britain in 1763 following the Seven Years' War. The influence of Catholicism remained in this territory, with celebration according to the 1662 English prayer book often featuring high church practices. The 1662 prayer book would remain the dominant liturgy until the first Canadian prayer book was published in the early Twentieth Century.

=== First Canadian prayer book ===
In 1911, the General Synod of the Church of England in the Dominion of Canada determined that "adaption and enrichment" of the more than 300-year-old English prayer book pattern should be undertaken, following the 1908 Lambeth Conference that encouraged such efforts. This came after nearly a decade of efforts towards revision, including one that was rejected in 1902 in favor of a minor addition to the appendix of the 1662 prayer book and another popular effort in 1905 that failed after criticism from pro-1662 low churchmen, whose objections failed against the 1911.

The 1918 prayer book (Note: The full title provided in the 1918 edition is The Book of Common Prayer and Administration of the Sacraments and Other Rites and Ceremonies of The Church According to the Use of The Church of England in the Dominion in Canada Together with The Psalter as it is Appointed to be Said or Sung in Church and the Form and Manner of Making Ordaining and Consecrating of Bishops Priests and Deacons.) introduced a large number of new prayers and additional Scripture options relative to prior English and American prayer book revisions. Imitating the Scottish Episcopal Church and U.S. Episcopal Church, there were several efforts to include an Epiclesis into the Anaphora of the Holy Communion office. Ultimately, few alterations were made to the Eucharistic liturgy, which Tractarians had initially sought to replace. Among the few changes were rubrics acknowledging already common practices, providing the option to replace the Ten Commandments with the Summary of the Law and the dropping of longer Exhortations. Other revisions included an enhancement of Matins to enable its usage as a standalone Sunday liturgy, the introduction of new prayers for illness reflecting medical advancements, and prayers for missionary efforts.

The 1918 prayer book was introduced as the "authorized book of public worship" on Easter, 1922. Nearly all copies of the 1918 prayer book were printed by Cambridge University Press. The uniformity of practice between parishes with the 1918 prayer book and 1938 The Book of Common Praise was considered a positive through the 1940s, though the logistical challenges of Canada's expansive territory meant many would attend United Church of Canada services.

=== Second revision process ===
Efforts to revise the Holy Communion office were revived with the Church of England's Proposed 1928 prayer book that restored a 1549-like liturgy. The General Synod authorized the beginning of a new full prayer book revision in 1937. The revisers reported on the less controversial recommendations regarding baptism and a penitential office in 1943, both of which sought to distance the liturgies from the notion of being born into sinfulness. A draft liturgy of the Eucharistic liturgy was produced in 1952, drawing criticism for its appending of the Summary of the Law directly to the Decalogue. The Draft Book of 1955 contained the same and introduced a new Anaphora.

The final approval of the 1959 revision occurred at the 1962 General Synod in Kingston, Ontario. The resolution approving Canon XXVI that established the prayer book "as the authorized Book of Common Prayer" was moved by Reginald Soward and carried unanimously by both houses of the synod. The approval coincided with the 300th anniversary of the 1662 English prayer book, which was commemorated by a prayer said by Primate Howard Clark.

== Contents ==
Besides the various offices and Psalter, the 1962 prayer book contains several other materials and documents. The preface, modified from that present in the 1918 edition, explains the development of the revisions and states all alterations from the 1662 prayer book would align "with the 27th Resolution of the Lambeth Conference of 1908 and the 78th Resolution of the Lambeth Conference of 1948." (Note: The mentioned resolution from 1948, divided into two sections that called for "a bond of unity throughout the whole Anglican Communion" by ensuring "revisions of the Book shall be in accordance with the doctrine and accepted liturgical worship of the Anglican Communion" and a celebration of the 1549 prayer book's anniversary would be observed in 1949.) It also states that the purpose of the prayer book is so that the members of the church "may become more truly what they already are: the People of God."

Following the preface, the "Solemn Declaration 1893" is included. It contains the details of the Church of England in the Dominion of Canada's full communion with the Church of England and continuation of its liturgical practice. A catechism is also provided, with minor amendments from that present in the 1662 prayer book, particularly in relation to the baptism of infants as entering them into a "household of faith."

=== Psalms ===
The Imprecatory Psalms and Psalm verses regarding curses were deleted for the 1959 revision, attributed to an aversion to violent imagery emanating from the two world wars and the view that such passages were not useful for the worship of God. The expungements were reversed for the 1985 Book of Alternative Services, which contains the full text of the Book of Psalms. The Coverdale Psalter forms the basis of the 1962 prayer book, but with minor alterations for updated vocabulary and verse numeration.

=== Collects ===
The third collect for Good Friday, commonly known as the Good Friday prayer for the Jews, is explicitly removed by Canon XIV of the Canons of the General Synod. Other collects within the 1962 prayer book remain largely similar to those within the 1662 edition, with Cranmerian language and cadence being removed in the Book of Alternative Services.

=== Holy Communion ===
The 1962 prayer book's Holy Communion office, a development within the English prayer book recension, is not significantly different from that present in the 1918 prayer book. However, where the 1918 prayer book had not received a new Anaphora, the 1962 edition's Prayer of Consecration is a uniquely Canadian form of the Epiclesis, intentionally distinct from that of the Proposed 1928 prayer book or 1929 Scottish Prayer Book.

=== Daily Office ===
Rubrics for the 1962 prayer book Daily Office offer several optional omissions and inclusions across the various liturgies. Among these are rubrics to optionally open Morning Prayer with "O Lord, open thou our lips" from Psalm 51 and omit all that follows the Te Deum if Morning Prayer is immediately followed by Holy Communion. Additionally, there is no prohibition against saying extemporaneous prayers. Lateral efforts encouraging the reincorporation of the 1962 prayer book into not only Holy Communion liturgies but also regular public Daily Office celebrations have been organized by Prayer Book Society of Canada.

=== Other offices ===
The ordinal for the ordination and consecration for deacons, priests, and bishops is essentially identical to that present in the 1662 prayer book, keeping with the 1918 prayer book. A set of prayers was added for missionary work, and the kalendar added 26 missionaries. Sermons at funeral offices are neither explicitly made an option nor prohibited, an allowance serving a pastoral need, particularly among charismatic communities.

== Translations and later revision ==
The Diocese of The Arctic published a translation of the 1959 prayer book into Eastern Eskimo (Inuktitut) in 1960, with a revision issued in 1972. Previous editions of the Book of Common Prayer had been translated into Inuktitut since 1881, initially under the missionary Edmund Peck and various times over the next century. The 1962 prayer book has also been translated into French, Mohawk, and Cree.

The effects of the Liturgical Movement had not been fully implemented by the Anglican Church of Canada until after the approval of the 1962 prayer book. While efforts prior to 1980 had produced a number of complete liturgies, they could not be compiled into a single text as extensive as a typical Book of Common Prayer. Among these was the text resulting from the 1967 General Assembly's desire to collect the "experimental liturgies and services now in use"; the 1969 Experiment and Liturgy also included explanations of principles of worship and experimentation. In order to release the approved liturgies while enabling the Doctrine and Worship Committee to continue its work, the 1980 General Synod approved the publication of a text intended as an optional alternative to the 1962 prayer book. The Anglican Church of Canada published the Book of Alternative Services in 1985. Among the most notable deviations from the 1962 prayer book are emphases on inclusive language and participation of the laity. The Book of Alternative Services also introduced a full set of liturgies for Holy Week.

The production of new and revised liturgies has continued since 1980, with several new texts authorized for regular and experimental liturgies. In 2001, a set of three orders of the Daily Office for usage alongside the Book of Alternative Services that draw from the 1962 prayer book's pattern. Additional liturgies presently approved for trial use include those for The Deconsecration of a Sacred Space, Preparation of Candidates and Community for the Celebration of Holy Baptism, and Liturgies for Journeys of Gender Transition and Affirmation.

== Associated texts ==
=== Hymnals ===
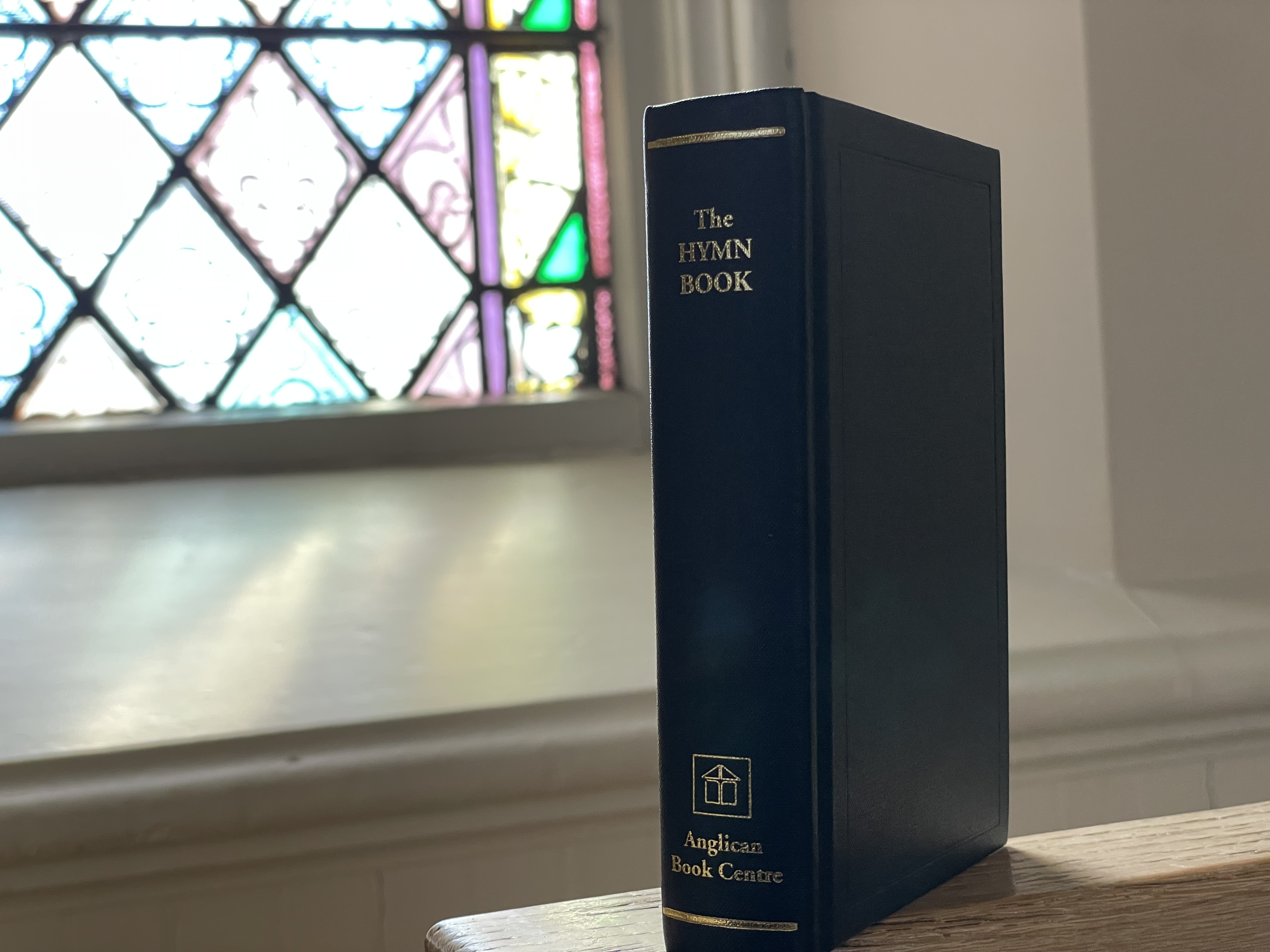
The 1938 edition of The Book of Common Praise of the Anglican Church of Canada

The Book of Common Praise (Note: In its 1938 edition, following the 1955 renaming of the Anglican Church of Canada, is officially titled The Book of Common Praise, Being the Hymn Book of The Anglican Church of Canada Compiled by a Committee of the General Synod.) is the name assigned to the standard authorized Anglican Church of Canada hymnal. The first edition of The Book of Common Praise, containing 795 hymns as well as 139 settings, was published in 1908 and known for its brown binding. It was followed by the blue-bound 1938 edition, initially containing 812 hymns, which was in use through the revision process of the 1962 prayer book. A revision of this edition was approved in 1963. This edition is partially credited with the introduction prayers for the dead into the 1962 prayer book, as several hymns for the deceased are included despite a tradition of excluding such prayers emanating from the Reformation.

An attempt at a union between the Anglican Church of Canada and the United Church of Canada produced the 1971 The Hymn Book of the Anglican Church of Canada and the United Church of Canada, identifiable by its red binding. In 1998, another edition of hymnal was published. Again bound in blue but now simply called Common Praise, this edition contains 769 hymns.

=== Supplements ===
In order to assist in the execution of the rubrics in the conduct of parochial liturgies, brethren of the Society of St. John the Evangelist's Bracebridge, Ontario, location published Readiness and Decency in 1961, intended to match with the requirements of the 1959 prayer book. This work was a successor to an edition of Readiness and Decency prepared in 1946 for usage alongside the 1918 prayer book. While certain rubrical flexibility exists for usage of the 1962 prayer book, the performance of the liturgy is to be within delineated rubrics, including in cases of ecumenical concelebration with other denominations.

Influenced by Walter Frere's 1911 Some Principles of Liturgical Reform, the 1962 prayer book includes the names of an increased number of post-Reformation individuals. However, whether all these individuals should be referred to as "saints" and how they should be liturgically celebrated were not described. The publication of For All the Saints by the Anglican Church of Canada following the introduction of the Book of Alternative Services would enumerate the celebration of Anglican saints. Further supplemental offices were provided within Archbishop Harold Sexton's 1964 The Canadian Book of Occasional Offices.

== See also ==
- Anglican Use
- Book of Common Prayer (1979)
- List of English-language hymnals by denomination
