= Anglican Church of Canada =

Church organization in Canada

- Église anglicane du Canada
- Nisi Dominus (incipit of Psalm 127)
- Abbreviation: ACC, ACoC
- Classification: Protestant (Note: Some reject the title of Protestant, arguing that Anglicanism should be classified as a separate branch of Christianity.)
- Orientation: Anglican
- Scripture: Holy Bible
- Theology: Anglican doctrine
- Polity: Episcopal
- Primate: Shane Parker
- Parishes: 1,498
- Associations: Anglican Communion
- Full communion: ELCC (since 2001); ELCA (since 2018); Moravians (since 2023); Churches in the Anglican Communion (CoE, TEC and other Anglican provinces); Churches in communion with the Anglican Communion (Old Catholic Union of Utrecht; Philippine Independent Church; Mar Thoma Syrian Church)
- Region: Canada
- Liturgy: 1962 Book of Common Prayer, Book of Alternative Services
- Headquarters: 80 Hayden Street; Toronto, Ontario, Canada
- Branched from: Church of England
- Separations: ACC (1977); AMiA (2000); ACNA (2009); Personal Ordinariate of the Chair of Saint Peter (2012)
- Members: 294,931 on parish rolls (2022)
- Official website: anglican.ca

Flag of the Anglican Church of Canada

The Anglican Church of Canada (ACC or ACoC; French: Église anglicane du Canada) is the province of the Anglican Communion in Canada. In 2016, the Anglican Church of Canada responded to a peer-reviewed study in the Journal of Anglican Studies published by Cambridge University Press reporting that the church has 1,447,080 total baptized members. In 2022, the Anglican Church counted 294,931 active members on parish rolls in 1,978 congregations, organized into 1,498 parishes. The 2021 Canadian census counted 1,134,315 self-identified Anglicans (3.1 percent of the total Canadian population), making the Anglican Church the third-largest Canadian church after the Catholic Church and the United Church of Canada.

Like other Anglican churches, the Anglican Church of Canada's liturgy utilizes a native version of the Book of Common Prayer, the 1962 prayer book. An alternative liturgical resource was developed in 1985 titled the Book of Alternative Services, which has developed into the dominant liturgical book of the church.

Unlike in the United Kingdom, the past title of "Defender of the Faith" in the title of the Canadian sovereign did not officially refer to the Christian faith, or to the Anglican Church of Canada. However, two out of three Chapels Royal in Canada are consecrated Anglican chapels.

== Official names ==
A bilingual example of the classic welcome sign displayed outside Anglican churches throughout Canada, at Christ Church Cathedral in Montreal

Until 1955, the Anglican Church of Canada was known as the "Church of England in the Dominion of Canada" or simply the "Church of England in Canada". In 1977, the church's General Synod adopted l'Église episcopale du Canada as its French-language name. This name was replaced with the current one, l'Église anglicane du Canada, in 1989; however, the former name is still used in some places along with the new one.

A matter of some confusion for Anglicans elsewhere in the world is that while the Anglican Church of Canada is a province of the Anglican Communion, the Ecclesiastical Province of Canada is merely one of four such ecclesiastical provinces of the Anglican Church of Canada. This confusion is furthered by the fact that Canada has ten civil provinces, along with three territories.

In recent years, there have been attempts by splinter groups to incorporate under very similar names. Corporations Canada, the agency of the federal government which has jurisdiction over federally-incorporated companies, ruled on 12 September 2005 that a group of dissident Anglicans may not use the name "Anglican Communion in Canada", holding that in Canada, the term "Anglican Communion" is associated only with the Anglican Church of Canada, being the Canadian denomination which belongs to that international body.

== History ==
=== Anglicanism in British North America ===
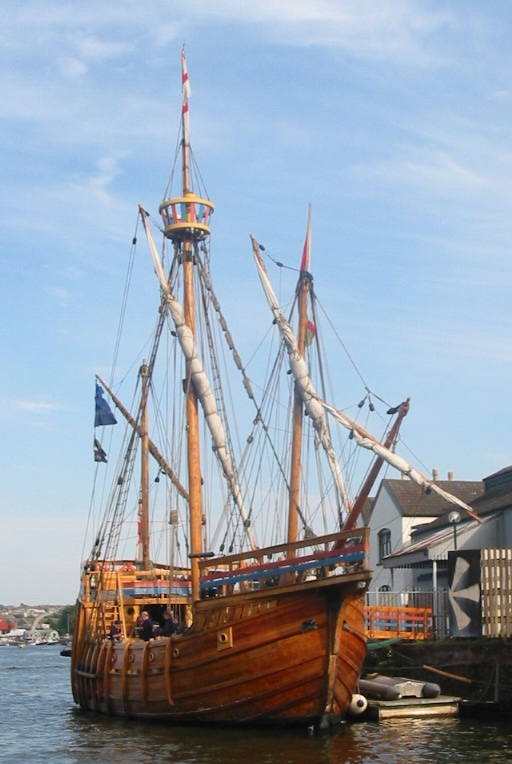
The replica of John Cabot's ship Matthew. The first cleric of the English Church sailed on her to North America in 1497.

The Anglican Church of Canada's prayer book commemorates John Cabot's landing on Newfoundland on 24 June 1497.

The first Church of England service was a celebration of Holy Communion at Frobisher Bay around 3 September 1578 by the chaplain on Martin Frobisher's voyage to the Arctic. The chaplain was "'Maister Wolfall (probably Robert Wolfall), minister and preacher', who had been charged by Queen Elizabeth 'to serve God twice a day'".

The propagation of the Church of England occurred in three ways. One way was by officers of ships and lay military and civil officials reading services from the Book of Common Prayer regularly when no clergy were present. For example, in the charter issued by Charles I for Newfoundland in 1633 was this directive: "On Sundays Divine Service to be said by some of the Masters of ships, such prayers as are in the Book of Common Prayer". A second way was the direct appointing and employing of clergy by the English government on ships and in settlements. A third way was the employment of clergy by private "adventurous" companies.

The first documented resident Church of England cleric on Canadian soil was Erasmus Stourton, who arrived at the "Sea Forest Plantation" at Ferryland, Newfoundland, in 1612 under the patronage of Lords Bacon and Baltimore. Stourton was of the Puritan party and remained in Ferryland until returning to England in 1628.

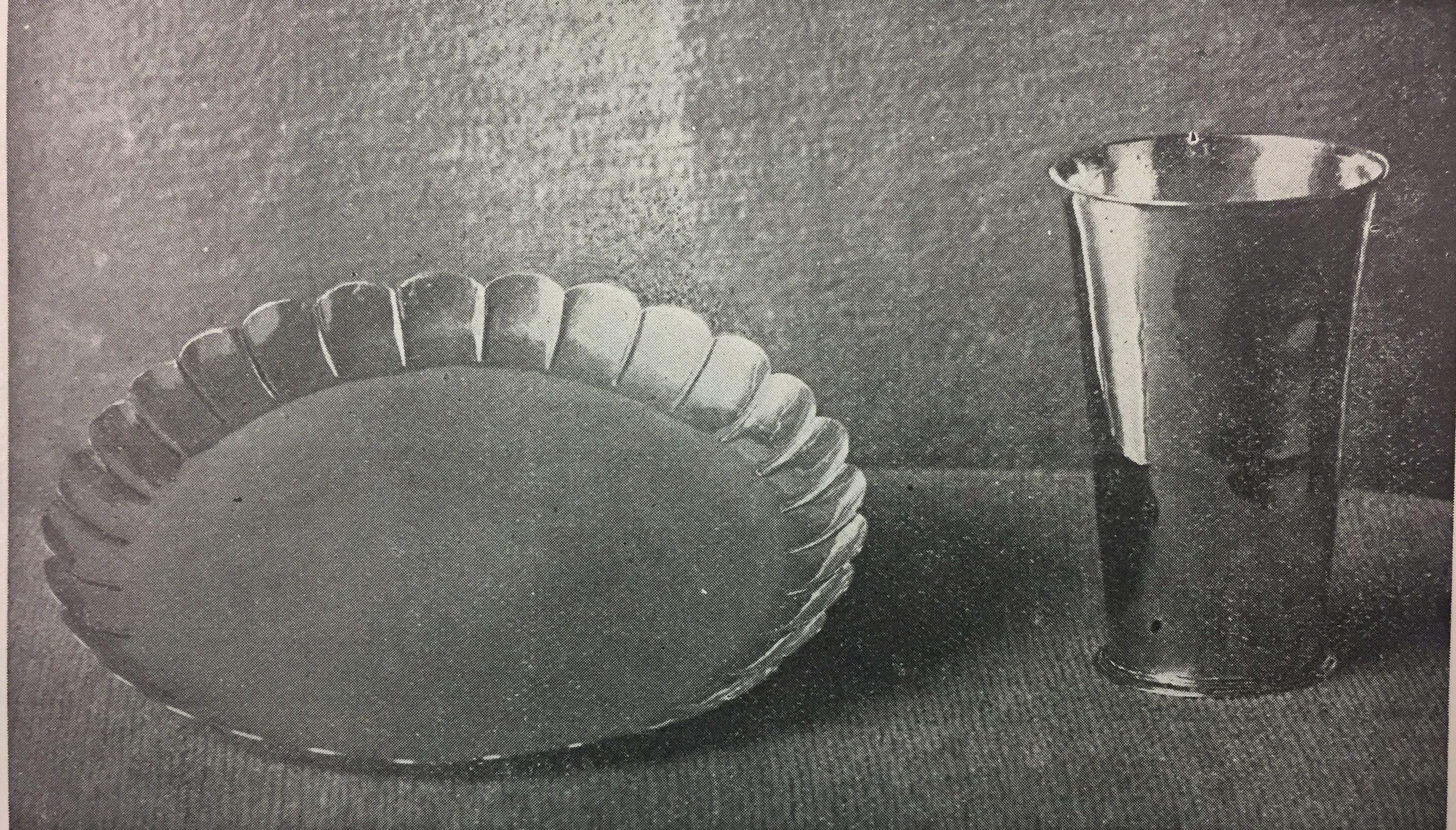
Oldest Anglican chalice in Canada (1663); Rev. Roger Aitken gave it to St. Peter's Anglican Church (West LaHave, Nova Scotia) (1818), University of King's College Archives

The overseas development of the Church of England in British North America challenged the insular view of the church at home. The editors of the 1662 Book of Common Prayer found that they had to address the spiritual concerns of the contemporary adventurer. In the 1662 Preface, the editors note:

... that it was thought convenient, that some Prayers and Thanksgivings, fitted to special occasions, should be added in their due places; particularly for those at Sea, together with an office for the Baptism of such as are of Riper Years: which, although not so necessary when the former Book was compiled, ... is now become necessary, and may be always useful for the baptizing of Natives in our Plantations, and others converted to the Faith.

The Hudson's Bay Company sent out its first chaplain in 1683, and where there was no chaplain the officers of the company were directed to read prayers from the BCP on Sundays.

Members of the Church of England established the Society for the Promotion of Christian Knowledge (SPCK) in 1698, the Society for the Propagation of the Gospel (SPG) in 1701, and the Church Missionary Society (CMS) in 1799. These and other organizations directly financed and sent missionaries to establish the English Church in Canada and to convert Canada's First Nations people. Direct aid of this sort lasted up to the 1940s.

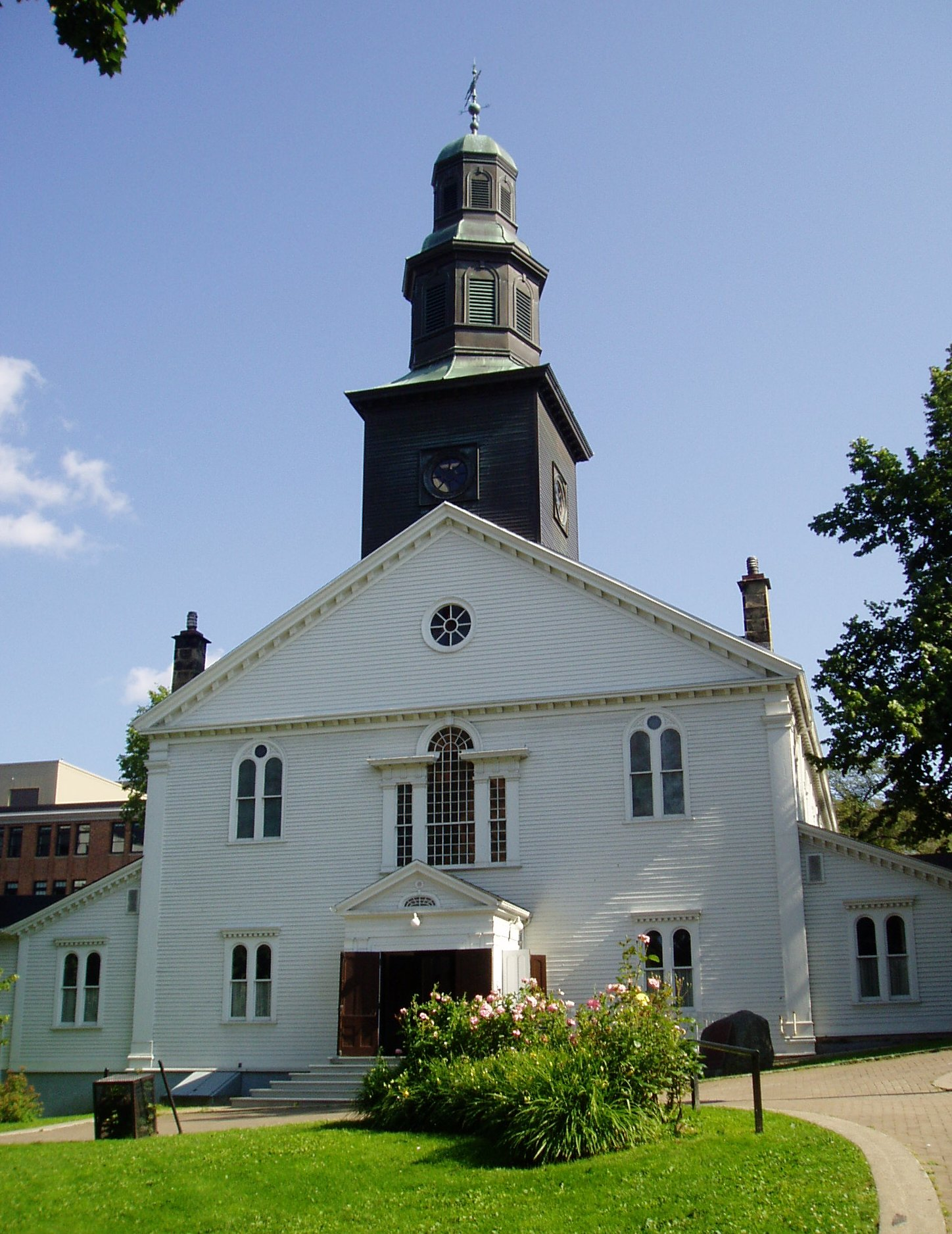
St. Paul's Church, Halifax. The oldest Anglican Church in Canada still standing, built in 1750

The first Anglican church in Newfoundland and in Canada was the small garrison chapel at St John's Fort built sometime before 1698. The first continuously resident cleric of the chapel was John Jackson – a Royal Navy chaplain who had settled in St. John's and was supported (but not financially) by the SPCK in 1698. In 1701, the SPG took over the patronage of St John's. Jackson continued to receive little actual support and was replaced by Jacob Rice in 1709. Rice wrote a letter to the Bishop of London detailing his efforts to repair the church which had been "most unchristianly defaced" and asking for help in acquiring communion vessels, a pulpit cloth, surplices and glass for the windows. The garrison chapel was replaced in 1720 and in 1759. The Cathedral of St John the Baptist in St John's, Newfoundland, is the oldest Anglican parish in Canada, founded in 1699 in response to a petition drafted by the Anglican townsfolk of St John's and sent to the Bishop of London, Henry Compton.

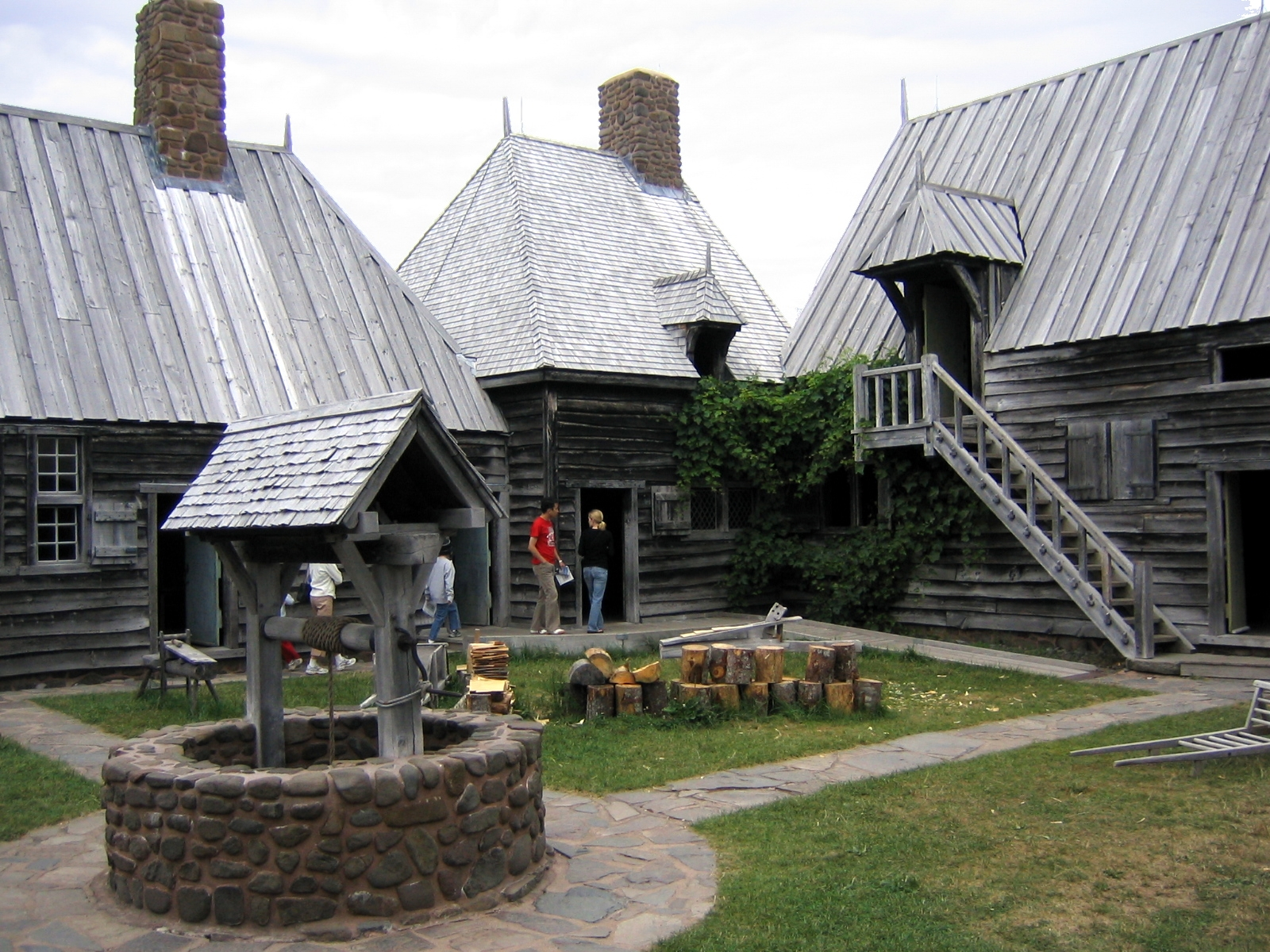
Reconstruction of Port Royal by Parks Canada

The first Anglican services in Nova Scotia are dated from 1710 when a New England army from Boston with assistance of the Royal Navy captured for the fourth time Port Royal in Nova Scotia and renamed it Annapolis Royal. When Annapolis was captured, one of the chaplains, John Harrison, held a service of thanksgiving with Samuel Hesker, the chaplain of the Marines, preaching the sermon. When the war ended in 1713 with the Treaty of Utrecht, Harrison continued to act as chaplain to the Garrison at Annapolis Royal.

Charles Inglis. Became first bishop of Nova Scotia in 1787 and first bishop of the Church of England outside the British Isles in the British Empire

The oldest Anglican church in Canada still standing is St Paul's Church in Halifax, Nova Scotia, whose foundation stone – the church is a wood structure – was laid by the Nova Scotia governor on 13 June 1750. St. Paul's opened for services on 2 September 1750 with an SPG cleric, William Tutty, preaching. St Paul's became the first Anglican cathedral in all of North America when Charles Inglis was appointed bishop in 1787. It has been a parish church since 1845 when St. Lukes Pro-Cathedral in Halifax replaced it. The Church of All Saints in Halifax was made the cathedral of the Nova Scotian diocese in 1910 and remains as such to date.

=== After the American Revolution ===
Anglicans were a more numerous minority among the United Empire Loyalists who fled to Canada after the American Revolution than Anglicans had been in the Thirteen Colonies as a whole (in 1775, 70–90% of the white population was not formally affiliated with a church). The Anglican Church was a dominant feature of the compact governments that presided over the colonies in British North America.

One of the former Americans was Charles Inglis who was rector of Trinity Church in New York when George Washington was in the congregation. He became the first bishop of the diocese of Nova Scotia on 12 August 1787 and the first Church of England bishop of a diocese outside the United Kingdom and in the British Empire. The Anglican Church of Canada's Prayer Book commemorates Inglis on 12 August.

There were historical connections between the Episcopal Church in the United States of America and the Anglican Church of Canada. Samuel Seabury and Inglis knew each other. In March 1783, a group of eighteen clergy – most prominent was Charles Inglis – met in New York to discuss the future of Nova Scotia, including plans for the appointment of a bishop in Nova Scotia and the college that would in time become the University of King's College, Halifax.

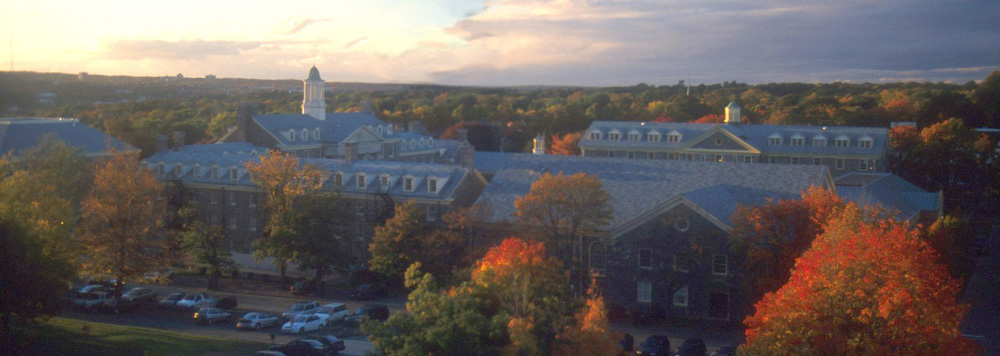
University of King's College. Founded by Bishop Inglis in 1789 as an Anglican college. It is the oldest English-speaking university in the Commonwealth of Nations outside Britain.

The connections between the now administratively separated churches continued in many ways. In the summer of 1857, Bishop Thomas F. Scott of Oregon visited Victoria and confirmed twenty candidates as the first British Columbian bishop would not be appointed for another two years. From the 1890s to 1902, Henry Irving (also known as Father Pat) was licensed in both the Diocese of Kootenay and the Diocese of Spokane – the two dioceses meet at the border between B.C. and the state of Washington. As Irving told his friends, he was

licensed by the American bishop as well as our own, so that I can pray for the President now and then when I've a foot across the line.

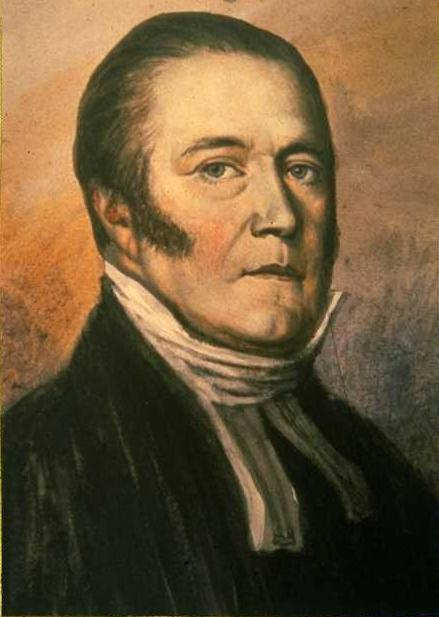
John Strachan

After the conquest of Quebec and the American Revolution, many leading Anglicans argued for the Church of England to become the established church in the Canadian colonies. The Constitutional Act of 1791 was promulgated, and interpreted to mean that the Church of England was the established church in the Canadas. The Church of England was established by law in Nova Scotia, New Brunswick and Prince Edward Island. In Lower Canada, the presence of a Roman Catholic majority made establishment in that province politically unwise. Bishop John Strachan of Toronto was a particular champion of the prerogatives of the Church of England.

The secular history of Canada depicts Bishop Strachan as an ally of the landed gentry of the so-called Family Compact of Upper Canada, opposed to the political aspirations of farmers and bourgeoisie for responsible government. Nonetheless, Strachan played considerable part in promoting education, as founder of Kings College (now the University of Toronto) and Trinity College. The Clergy reserves, land which had been reserved for use by the non-Roman Catholic clergy, became a major issue in the mid-19th century. Anglicans argued that the land was meant for their exclusive use, while other denominations demanded that it be divided among them.

In Upper Canada, leading dissenters such as Methodist minister Egerton Ryerson – in due course a minister of education in the government of Upper Canada – agitated against establishment. Following the Upper Canada Rebellion, the creation of the united Province of Canada, and the implementation of responsible government in the 1840s, the unpopularity of the Anglican-dominated Family Compact made establishment a moot point. The church was disestablished in Nova Scotia in 1850 and Upper Canada in 1854. By the time of Canadian Confederation in 1867, the Church of England was disestablished throughout British North America.

=== Autonomy and interdependence ===
Until the 1830s, the Anglican church in Canada was synonymous with the Church of England: bishops were appointed and priests supplied by the church in England and funding for the church came from the British Parliament. The first Canadian synods were established in the 1850s, giving the Canadian church a degree of self-government. As a result of the UK Privy Council decision of Long v. Gray in 1861, all Anglican churches in colonies of the British Empire became self-governing. Even so, the first General Synod for all of Canada was not held until 1893. That first synod made the Solemn Declaration 1893, which declares that the Church of England in the Dominion of Canada is "in full communion with the Church of England throughout the world, . . . and in fellowship of the One Holy Catholic and Apostolic Church". Robert Machray was chosen as the Canadian church's first Primate.

=== Expansion ===
As the new Canadian nation expanded after Confederation in 1867, so too did the Anglican Church. After the establishment of the first ecclesiastical province – that of Canada in 1860 – others followed. The first was the Ecclesiastical Province of Rupert's Land, created in 1875 to encompass Anglican dioceses outside what were then the boundaries of Canada: present-day Northern Ontario and Northern Quebec, the western provinces, and the Territories. In the forty years between self-government in 1861 and 1900, sixteen of the currently existing dioceses were created, as numbers blossomed with accelerating immigration from England, Scotland, and Ireland. The far-flung nature of settlement in the North-West together with a shortage of resources to pay stipendiary clergy early led to a significant reliance on women lay workers, deemed "deaconesses", for missionary outreach, a phenomenon which made the first ordination of women to the priesthood in 1976 relatively uncontroversial at small churches and in indigenous communities. By 2016, over 35% of ACC clergy were women, though some parishes would not accept female priests.

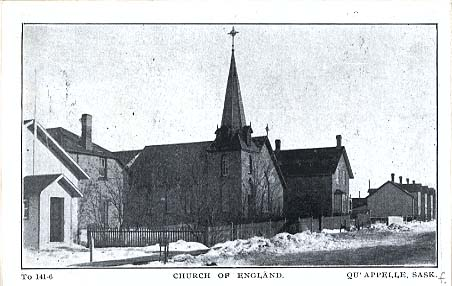
St Peter's Pro-Cathedral, Qu'Appelle, Assiniboia, North-West Territories

During this time, the Anglican Church assumed de facto administrative responsibility in the far-flung wilderness of Canada and British North America. The church contracted with colonial officials and later the federal Crown to administer residential schools for the indigenous peoples of the First Nations. Such schools removed children from their home communities in an attempt to forcibly assimilate them into the dominant European culture and language and adapt them as a menial labour workforce. Emotional, physical, and sexual abuse of the children was rife in these schools, as well as sickness and malnutrition.

At the same time, Anglican missionaries were involved in advocating for First Nations rights and land claims on behalf of those people to whom they were ministering (for example, the Nisga'a of northern British Columbia). One of the earliest First Nations students to be educated at Red River in the 1830s was Henry Budd. He was ordained in 1850 as the first First Nations priest and became the missionary at Fort Cumberland on the Saskatchewan River and then to the post of The Pas. The Anglican Church of Canada's Prayer Book commemorates Henry Budd on 2 April.

Despite this growth in both the size and role of the church, progress was intermittently undermined by internal conflict over churchmanship. This was manifested in the creation of competing theological schools (Trinity versus Wycliffe Colleges in the University of Toronto, for example), a refusal by bishops of one ecclesiastical party to ordain those of the other, and – in the most extreme cases – schism. This latter phenomenon was famously and acrimoniously borne out in the high profile defection of Edward Cridge, the Dean of the Diocese of British Columbia in Victoria, B.C., together with much of his cathedral congregation, to the Reformed Episcopal Church in 1874, although the movement was ultimately confined to that one congregation in a then-remote town together with a second parish in New Westminster, the then-capital of the originally separate mainland colony of British Columbia.

==== Overseas mission ====
In 1888, the church began its missionary activities in Central Japan, which would later result in the formation of the Diocese of Chubu in the Anglican Church in Japan. A Church of England conference held in Winnipeg in August 1890 established the union of all synods. Missionaries from Canada to Japan included Archdeacon Alexander Croft Shaw, minister to the British Legation in Tokyo, J. G. Waller in Nagano, and Margaret Young in Nagoya. Later in 1902, the Missionary Society of the Church of England in Canada (MSCC) was created to support overseas mission by combining the Domestic and Foreign Missionary Society (DFMS, 1883–1902), the Canadian Church Missionary Society (CCMS, 1894–1903) and the Woman’s Auxiliary (1885–1966) to DFMS.

=== Twentieth century ===
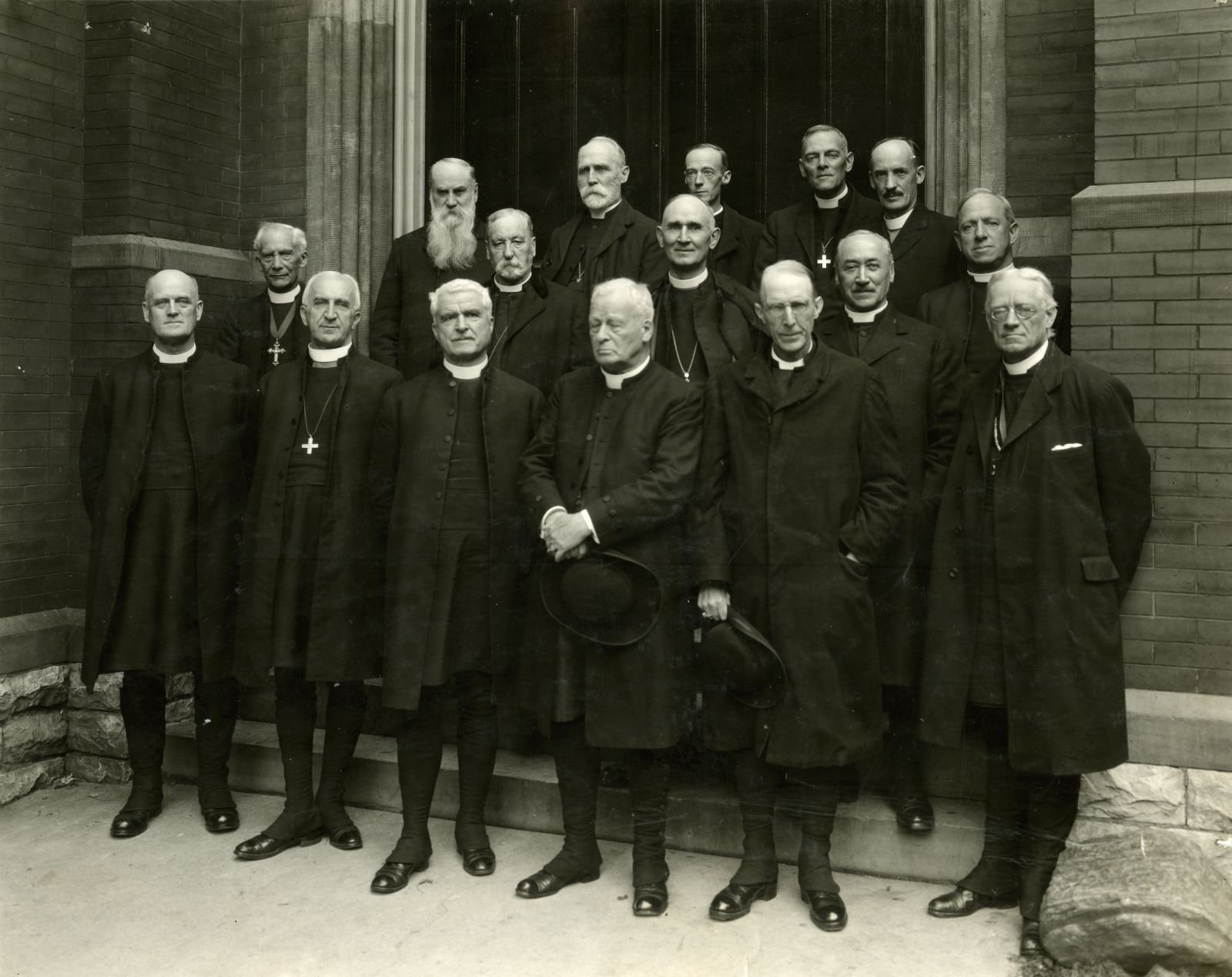
Anglican archbishops and bishops of Canada, c. 1924

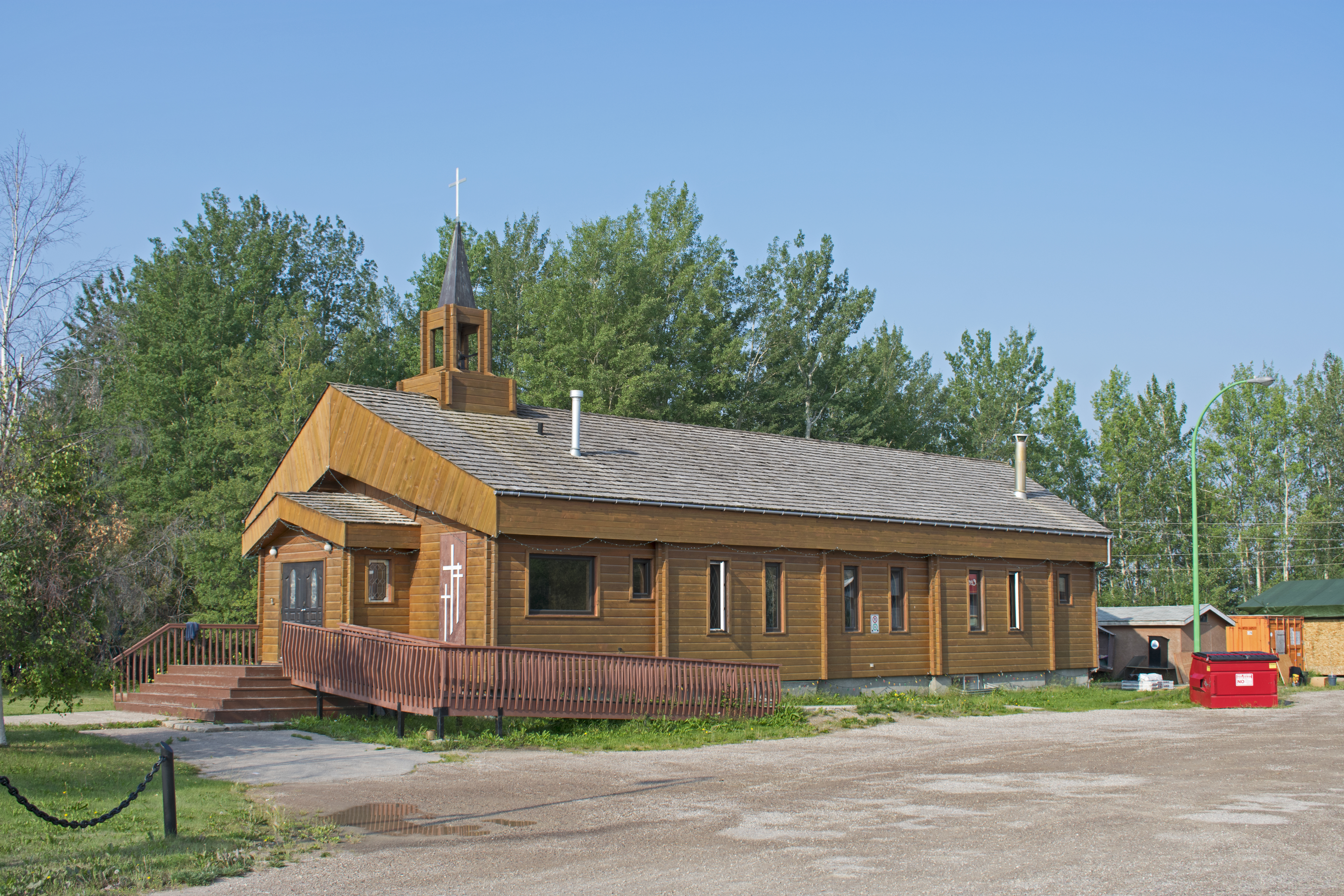
The church in Hay River, Northwest Territories

Expansion evolved into a general complacency as the 20th century progressed. During the early part of this period, the ACC reinforced its traditional role as the establishment church, although influences from the autochthonous Protestant social gospel movement, and the Christian socialism of elements in the Church of England increasingly were felt. This influence would eventually result in the creation of what would come to be known as the Primate's World Relief and Development Fund, in 1958.

By the middle of the century, pressure to reform the structures of the church were being felt. The name of the church was changed in 1955 from "The Church of England in Canada" to the "Anglican Church of Canada" and a major revision of the Book of Common Prayer was undertaken in 1962, the first in over forty years. In 1962, the United Church of Canada and the Anglican Church of Canada jointly published Growth in Understanding, a study guide on union and, on 1 June 1965, the Principles of Union between the United Church and the Anglican Church. Despite these changes, the church was still perceived as complacent and disengaged, a view emphasized by the title of Pierre Berton's best-selling commissioned analysis of the denomination, The Comfortable Pew, published in 1965.

Change became more rapid towards the close of the 1960s, as mainline churches including the Anglicans began to see the first wave of evaporation from the pews. On 23 August 1967, the Anglican Church of Canada agreed to permit the remarriage of divorced persons in their churches. Ecumenical relationships were intensified, with a view to full communion. While negotiations with the largest Canadian Protestant denomination, the United Church of Canada, faltered in the early 1970s, the Anglican Church achieved full communion with the Evangelical Lutheran Church in Canada as the century drew to a close.

New liturgical resources were introduced, which would culminate in the publication of the Book of Alternative Services in 1985. Agitation for the ordination of women led to the vote on 18 June 1975, by the Anglican Church of Canada in favour of ordination as priests, and, eventually, bishops. Social and cultural change led to the church's decision to marry divorced couples, to endorse certain forms of contraception, and to move towards greater inclusion of homosexual people in the life of the church.

These changes have been accompanied by a massive decline in numbers, with a majority (53%) leaving the denomination in the period from 1961 to 2001, according to an independent survey. In the 21st century, numerical decline has continued. In 2016, responding to a peer-reviewed study in the Journal for Anglican Studies published by Cambridge University Press, the Anglican Church of Canada reported that the church had 1,447,080 total baptised members, including inactive members, and 545,957 active members. From 2001 to 2022, parish membership declined from 641,845 to 294,931, a decline of 54%. From 2001 to 2011, according to the Canadian census, self-identified Anglicans declined from 2,035,500 to 1,631,845, a decline of 19.8% in absolute terms and a drop in the proportion of the Canadian population from 6.9% to 5%. The number of self-identified Anglicans further declined to little more than 1 million in 2021, amounting to 3,1% of Canadians.

=== Twenty-first century ===
In the twenty-first century a division in the Anglican Communion developed when more conservative churches opposed liberal positions on issues such as same-sex marriage and acceptance of homosexuality. The Anglican realignment was reflected in Canada with the development of the Anglican Essentials Canada, the Anglican Network in Canada (aligned with the Anglican Church in North America) and Anglican Coalition in Canada (aligned with the Anglican Mission in the Americas) made up of conservative churches and their congregants and which have either separated from or dissent within the Anglican Church of Canada.

== Structure ==
Anglican Christians around the world are held together by common forms of worship, such as the Book of Common Prayer and its modern alternatives, which embody its doctrine. Other formularies, such as the Ordinal, the Thirty-Nine Articles and the First and Second Book of Homilies provide a shared theological tradition. Other instruments of unity in the Anglican Communion are, locally, its bishops and, internationally, the Archbishop of Canterbury, and, in more recent times, the Lambeth Conferences, the Anglican Communion Primates' Meeting, and the biennial Anglican Consultative Council. These last four instruments of unity have moral but not legislative authority over individual provinces.

In Canada, Anglican bishops have divested some of their authority to three bodies – the General Synod, the Provincial Synod (there are four in Canada) and the diocesan synods (there are 29).

The national church in Canada is structured on the typical Anglican model of a presiding archbishop (the Primate) and Synod.

In 2007 the church considered rationalizing its increasingly top-heavy episcopal structure as its membership waned, which could have meant a substantial reduction in the number of dioceses, bishops and cathedrals.

=== Houses of Bishops ===
Diocesan bishops promise "to hold and maintain the Doctrine, Sacraments and discipline of Christ, as the Lord hath commanded in his holy Word, and as the Anglican Church of Canada hath received and set forth the same." They work collegially as a House of Bishops. There is a national House of Bishops, which meets regularly throughout the year, as well as provincial houses of bishops. These are chaired, respectively, by the Primate and the individual metropolitans.

=== Primate ===
The Primate of the ACC – originally the "Primate of All Canada" in echo of the titles of the Archbishops of Canterbury and York in England and to distinguish the national church from the Ecclesiastical Province of Canada (the former territory of Lower Canada, the Maritimes, and Newfoundland) – is elected by General Synod from among all the bishops of the Anglican Church of Canada. Primates hold the ex officio rank of archbishop; in 1931 the General Synod approved a recommendation that a fixed primatial See (as of the Archbishop of Canterbury) be established and in 1955 it was recommended that "a small See [be created] in the vicinity of Ottawa to which the Dioceses of The Arctic, Moosonee, Keewatin and Yukon would be attached, forming a fifth Province." However, General Synod rejected the proposal in 1959 and in 1969 "the Canon on the Primacy was amended to require the Primate to maintain an office at the national headquarters of the Church, with a pastoral relationship to the whole Church, but no fixed Primatial See" as with Presiding Bishops of the Episcopal Church of the USA and unlike Primates of England, Australia and elsewhere. In consequence, Primates of the Anglican Church of Canada are not diocesan bishops and generally do not carry out ordinary episcopal functions; the office was originally held office for life but in recent years Primates have retired by the age of 70.

In recent decades Primates of the ACC have intermittently held a considerable place in public life. In particular, Archbishop Ted Scott, who was a president of the World Council of Churches, was a member of a Commonwealth Eminent Persons committee in respect of the devolution of power from the white-only government of South Africa to a multiracial government. Scott's successor, Michael Peers, continued the close association with the anti-apartheid movement in South Africa and was thrust into a high profile in Canadian national life when he insisted that the ACC should shoulder its responsibilities for the legacy of the Indian Residential Schools, and when he protested at what he described as the downplaying of Christian witness in the official commemoration of events of national importance.

There have been thirteen primates in the history of the church. The current primate is Shane Parker who succeeded Linda Nicholls, formerly the bishop of the Diocese of Huron. Nicholls, who was elected on the third ballot at the July 2019 General Synod, was the first woman to head the Anglican Church of Canada as well as the second female primate in the Anglican Communion. Nicholls retired from the ministry on 15 September 2024, one month before reaching the mandatory age of 70, and was succeeded by Anne Germond, the current metropolitan of the Ecclesiastical Province of Ontario, in an acting role until the election of Parker.

Shane Parker was elected to a three-year term as primate on June 26, 2025 on the fifth ballot although he was not initially a candidate for the position. He was installed on June 29, 2025. Previously, he served as the Bishop of Ottawa from 2020 to 2025.

=== General Synod ===
The chief synodical governing body of the church is the General Synod of the Anglican Church of Canada. The Declaration of Principles in the General Synod Handbook contains: the Solemn Declaration 1893; the Basis of Constitution; and the Fundamental Principles previously adopted by the Synod in 1893 and these constitute the foundation of the Synod structure. The General Synod meets triennially and consists of lay people, clergy, and bishops from each of the 29 dioceses. In-between General Synods, the day-to-day affairs of the ACC are administered by a group elected by General Synod, called the Council of General Synod (COGS), which consults with and directs national staff working at the church's headquarters in Toronto.

Each diocese holds annual diocesan synods from which lay and clergy delegates are elected as representatives to General Synod, the national deliberative body, which meets triennially. These delegates join the Primate and the bishops of the church to form three Orders – lay, clergy, and bishops. The most recent general synod was in 2019 and met in Vancouver.

General Synod has authority to define "the doctrines of the Church in harmony with the Solemn Declaration 1893", and over matters of discipline, and canon law of the national church, in addition to more prosaic matters of administration and policy. At each diocesan synod, the three houses elect representatives to sit on the Council of General Synod, which – with the Primate – acts as the governing authority of the national church in-between synods.

=== Provinces, dioceses and parishes ===
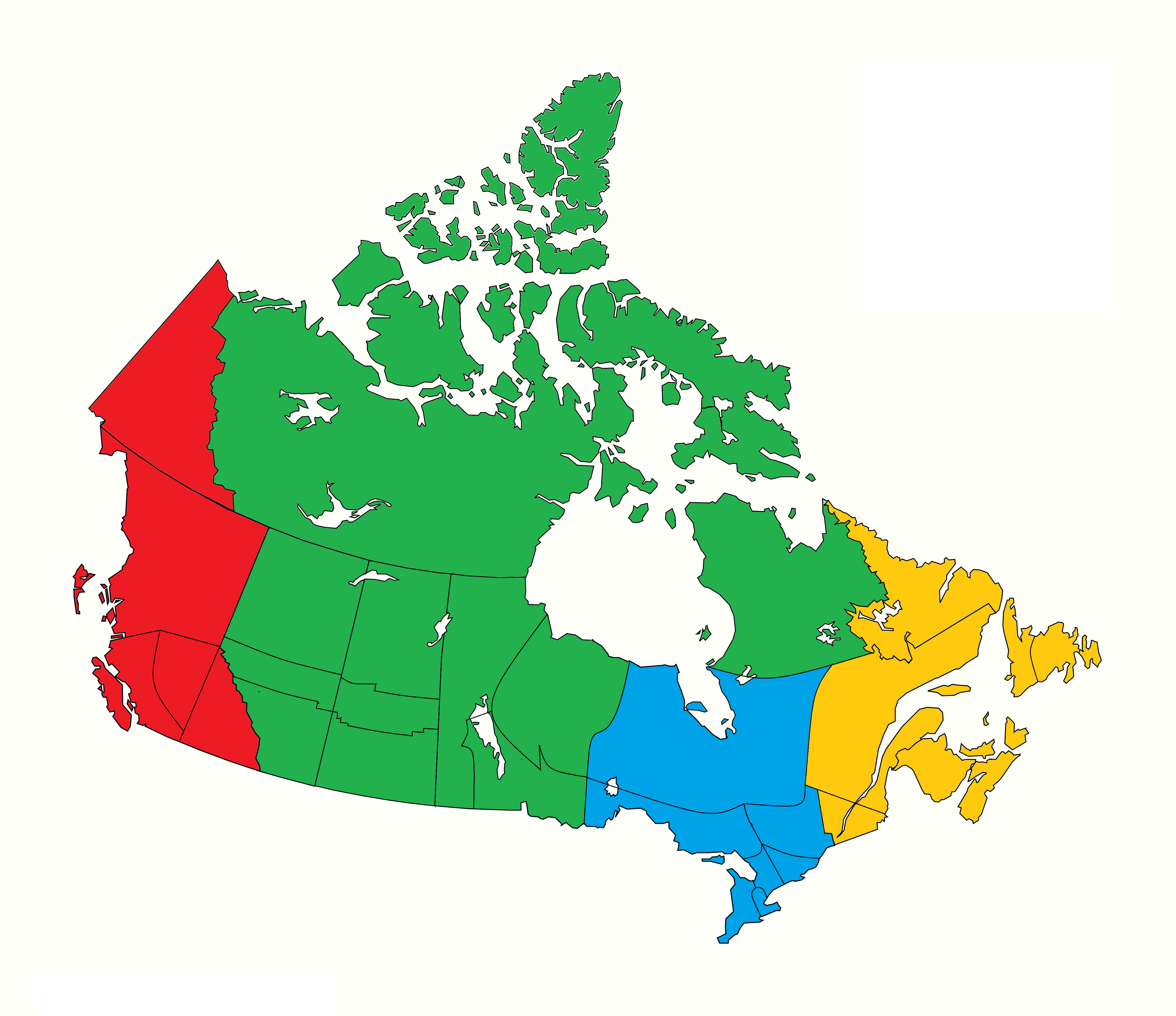
The ecclesiastical provinces and dioceses of the Anglican Church of Canada.

The ACC is divided into four ecclesiastical provinces – British Columbia and the Yukon, Canada (encompassing the Atlantic provinces and Quebec), Ontario, and Northern Lights (encompassing the prairie provinces, Nunavut, the Northwest Territories, and portions of Ontario). Within the provinces are 29 dioceses and one grouping of churches in British Columbia that functions equivalently to a diocese.

Each province has its own archbishop, known as the Metropolitan, and each diocese has a bishop, although there are no metropolitical dioceses (or archdioceses) as such; a metropolitan is styled "Archbishop of [his or her own diocese], and Metropolitan of [the ecclesiastical province]."

As with other churches in the Anglican tradition, each diocese is divided up into geographical regions called parishes, where certain authority resides in the rector or priest-in-charge (as laid out in the induction service, the ordinal, and the cleric's licence) and in the parish council (or vestry) as defined in diocesan canons. The legal relationship between a parish and its diocese and between a parish and its synod varies around the country and even within dioceses depending in part on when each was established.

Both dioceses and provinces hold synods, usually annually, consisting of the active diocesan clergy and lay delegates elected by parish churches. Diocesan synods elect lay and clergy delegates to provincial synod. On the diocesan level, there are effectively two houses instead of three – clergy and laity – with the diocesan bishop required to give assent to motions passed by synod.

Between 1995 and 1997 over 500 parishes closed. Of all the mainline churches in Canada, the Anglican Church of Canada has the most precipitous drop in members; according to its own records, a reduction of 10% in membership occurs annually.

== Ecumenical relations ==
The ACC is a member of the World Council of Churches and Archbishop Ted Scott was a president of that body; the ACC has been an active participant in the Canadian Council of Churches from its establishment in 1944. Through the 1960s the ACC was involved in talks with the United Church of Canada and the Disciples of Christ with a view to institutional union, in the course of which a comprehensive Plan of Union was formulated and a joint Anglican-United Church hymnal produced in 1971. Ultimately such talks foundered when the Houses of Laity and Clergy voted in favour of union but the House of Bishops vetoed it, largely due to concerns over the maintenance of the apostolic succession of the episcopacy.

In 2001, the ACC established full communion with the Evangelical Lutheran Church in Canada (ELCIC), both of which operate in Canada. In 2019, full communion was regularized to apply between the mainline Anglican and Evangelical Lutheran churches in the United States and in Canada, resulting in a full communion status with the Evangelical Lutheran Church in America. In 2023, full communion was extended to the Northern Province of the Moravian Church in North America, by an agreement with the ELCIC and the ACC. Two other churches with which the Anglican Church of Canada is in full communion via the Anglican Communion operate in Canada, being the Mar Thoma Syrian Church and the Church of South India.

Through the Anglican Communion, the ACC is also in full communion with the churches of the Old Catholic Union of Utrecht and the Philippine Independent Church, of which there are none in Canada. As there are no Utrecht Union or Philippine Independent communities in Canada, the ACC provides for the spiritual care of those members of those churches while they are in the country. However, unlike the Anglican Churches of the British Isles, it is not a signatory to the Porvoo Agreement which established full communion between those bodies and a number of European Lutheran churches.

Contrary to the practice in Roman Catholic, Eastern Orthodox and Oriental Orthodox communions, all baptized Christians are welcome to receive Holy Communion in Canadian Anglican churches, in accordance with the resolution in favour of open communion at the 1968 Lambeth Conference.

== Liturgy and service books ==
In 1918 and 1962 the ACC produced successive authoritative Canadian Books of Common Prayer (BCPs), substantially based on the 1662 English prayer book; both were conservative revisions consisting largely of minor editorial emendations of archaic diction. The 1962 Canadian prayer book is still in regular use throughout the ACC, and has been translated into a number of languages. The French translation, Le Recueil des Prières de la Communauté Chrétienne, was published in 1967.

In 1985 the Book of Alternative Services (BAS) was issued, officially not designated to supersede but to be used alongside the 1962 prayer book. It is a more thoroughgoing modernizing of Canadian Anglican liturgies, containing considerable borrowings from Lutheran, Church of England, American Episcopal and post-Second Vatican Council Roman Rite Catholic service books; it was received with general enthusiasm and in practice has largely supplanted the Book of Common Prayer, although the BCP remains the official Liturgy of the Church in Canada. The preference for the BAS among many parishes and clergy has been countered by the founding of the Prayer Book Society of Canada, which seeks "to promote the understanding and use of the BCP as a spiritual system of nurture for life in Christ". The tension between adherents of the BCP and advocates of the BAS has contributed to a sense of disaffection within the church. There have been increasing calls for revision of the Book of Alternative Services. Those who use the BAS have cited various shortcomings as it ages and newer liturgies are produced elsewhere in the Communion. At the 2007 General Synod, a resolution was passed which will begin the process of revising the modern language liturgies.

Hymnody is an important aspect of worship in Anglicanism, and the ACC is no different. There is no one hymnal required to be used, although the ACC has produced four successive authorized versions since 1908. The most recent, Common Praise, was published in 1998. Anglican plainsong is represented in the new hymnal, as well as in the older Canadian Psalter, published in 1963. Notable Canadian Anglican hymnists include Derek Holman, Gordon Light, Herbert O'Driscoll, and Healey Willan. For a time, beginning in the early 1970s, many Anglican congregations experimented with The Hymn Book produced jointly with the United Church of Canada under the direction of Canadian composer F. R. C. Clarke, but both churches have since abandoned the common hymnal.

Like most churches of the Anglican Communion, the ACC was beset by intense conflict over the ritualism controversies of the latter 19th century, leading in some extreme cases to schism. Throughout much of the 20th century, parishes – and, to a certain extent, dioceses or regions – were more or less divided between high church (Anglo-Catholic), low church (evangelical), and broad church (middle-of-the-road). Many of these designations have become muted with time, as the passions which fired the debate have cooled and most parishes have found a happy medium or accommodation.

== Beliefs ==
As is the case in churches directly influenced by Anglican ethos and theology, the ACC tends to reflect the dominant social and cultural strains of the nation in which it finds itself. For most of its history, the ACC embodied the conservative, colonial outlook of its mostly British-descended parishioners and of English Canada as a whole. In the post-World War II period, as the character of Canada changed, so too did the attitudes of people in the pews, and by extension, the church.

=== Ordination of women and remarriage of divorced persons ===
In recent years the ACC has been a leading progressive force within the Anglican Communion. In the 1970s the then primate, Ted Scott, argued at the Lambeth Conference in favour of women's ordination. The ACC ordained its first woman as a priest in 1976 and its first woman as a bishop in 1993. Many parishes, particularly in the west and even more particularly on aboriginal reserves, were already served by women deacons and allowing them to be ordained priests regularized their situation and permitted a regular sacramental ministry to be available in the parishes they served. Nonetheless, this change – in concert with such moves as allowing the remarriage of divorced persons – caused strains among more conservative parishes, both Anglo-Catholic and Evangelical. In the early 1970s some members of the ACC left to join breakaway Anglican groups such as the small Anglican Catholic Church of Canada.

=== Life issues ===
The ACC has taken a moderate anti-abortion stance in the past. The official policy is that "abortion is always the taking of a human life and, in our view, should never be done except for serious therapeutic reasons." In 1989, the ACC stated that "In the light of the Government's announcement of a new Abortion Bill, the Anglican Church reaffirms its position that both the rights and needs of women, and the rights and needs of the unborn, require protection." The ACC has not released any official statement on abortion since then.

The ACC also firmly opposes euthanasia and assisted suicide.

=== Marriage ===
In 2002, the Synod of the Diocese of New Westminster (located in Vancouver and the south-west of British Columbia) voted to permit the blessing of same-sex unions by parishes requesting episcopal authorization to do so. Since then another ten dioceses (Edmonton, Nova Scotia and Prince Edward Island, Winnipeg-based Rupert's Land, Ottawa, Toronto, London-based Huron, Quebec, Hamilton-based Niagara, Montreal and Victoria-based British Columbia) have followed suit. The Anglican Parishes of the Central Interior (formerly the Diocese of Cariboo and now known as the Territory of the People) also permit such rites. On 30 September 2012, the Bishop of Saskatoon ordained as deacon a person who is civilly married to a person of the same sex. Also in 2012, the Diocese of Montreal ordained two openly gay and partnered men to the priesthood.

In 2016, a proposal to change the marriage canon to include same-sex marriage received 2/3 in favour in all three houses and was passed. The dioceses of Niagara and Ottawa, both of which already allowed blessing rites, announced after the 2016 vote that they would immediately allow same-sex marriages.

The Diocese of Toronto has specifically allowed churches to perform same-sex marriages as of mid-November 2016 when Archbishop Colin Johnson issued the Pastoral Guidelines for Same-Sex Marriages. In brief, the guidelines stated that such marriages could proceed in the church "at the pastoral discretion of the Bishop and with the agreement of local clergy". Also in 2016, the Diocese elected the first openly gay and partnered bishop.

The General Synod held the second reading of a motion to approve same-sex marriage on 12 July 2019. In spite of support by the laity and clergy, the motion did not pass because it was not supported by a full two-thirds of the bishops.

At the same General Synod, a resolution, called "A Word to the Church", was approved that recognised that a diocese may choose to perform same-sex marriages.

=== Indian residential schools ===
During the 19th century the federal Crown delegated the operation of Indian residential schools to the ACC and Roman Catholic religious orders (with some minimal involvement by the Methodist and Presbyterian churches of Canada as well). In the 1980s numerous tort claims were brought by former students of such schools against both the Crown and church organizations in respect of abuse by church personnel in such institutions and to a lesser extent in respect of a perception that such schools had been insensitive to issues of preservation of aboriginal culture and identity.

The claims were ultimately comprehensively settled but the damage to the morale of the ACC has yet to be entirely resolved: the Diocese of Cariboo was obliged to declare bankruptcy and was liquidated — its successor is the Territory of the People (called the Anglican Parishes of the Central Interior until 2016), with episcopal oversight by a suffragan bishop to the Metropolitan (of BC). (Its now-unofficial cathedral of St Paul in Kamloops continues to be deemed a cathedral, its rector being styled "Very Reverend" as a dean). The Diocese of Qu'Appelle and the General Synod of the ACC were in considerable danger of the same fate until settlement of the claims was reached on a national basis. Michael Peers (Primate, 1986–2004) took a major role on behalf of the ACC with respect to reaching a settlement with the federal Crown, which was the defendant of the first instance and which counter-claimed against the ACC and Roman Catholic religious orders. He offered the ACC's apology to aboriginal people and delayed his retirement until 2004 when his successor could come to the primacy with the issue also retired.

In January 2007 the ACC announced the appointment of Mark MacDonald, an aboriginal American and Bishop of Alaska in the Episcopal Church (United States), as the National Indigenous Bishop with pastoral oversight over all indigenous members of the Anglican Church of Canada. MacDonald resigned in 2022 after admitting to sexual misconduct.

In 2017 Melanie Delva was appointed as the Reconciliation Animator for the Anglican Church of Canada, with a focus on responding the Truth and Reconciliation Commission of Canada's Calls to Action.

In 2022 the Anglican Council of Indigenous People announced the appointment of Chris A. Harper, the Diocesan Bishop of Saskatoon, as the second National Indigenous Anglican Archbishop for the Anglican Church of Canada.

== Cathedrals and notable parishes ==
=== Cathedrals ===
The oldest Anglican cathedral in Canada and North America is St. Paul's Church in Halifax which was made Canada's first cathedral when Charles Inglis became the first bishop in 1787. St Paul's remained a cathedral for 78 years until 1864 when it was replaced by St Luke's pro-cathedral.

The Cathedral of the Holy Trinity, Quebec City is the oldest Anglican cathedral in Canada that continues in that capacity, having been "built from 1800 to 1804; it was constructed according to drawings done by Captain William Hall and Major William Robe, officers of the military engineering corps of the British Army, stationed in Quebec City."

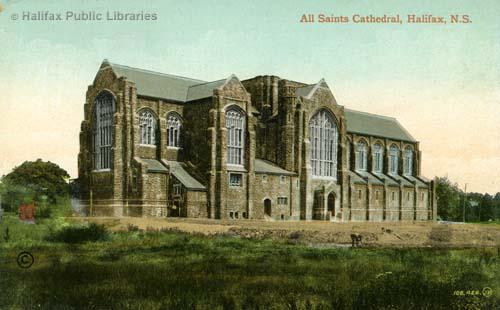
Cathedral Church of All Saints, Halifax

Most Anglican cathedrals in Canada are modest parish churches, and it is only the cathedrals of Toronto, (St. James Cathedral), Montreal, Kingston, Halifax, St. John's, and Victoria which have significant dimensions or imposing designs, though even they are modest by European or even Australian standards. Diocesan services are often held in Roman Catholic or United churches because of the limited seating in most Anglican cathedrals.

The Cathedral Church of All Saints in Halifax, Canada's largest Anglican Cathedral, was officially opened in September 1910 in conjunction with the national celebration of the Bicentenary of the Anglican Church in Canada being held in that city. Notable and distinguished Anglican and Episcopal clergy from all over the world attended this cathedral opening as well as many other local events that took place over the 10-day celebration. In the spring of 1912, burial services for some victims of the Titanic were held at All Saints Cathedral.

Christ Church Cathedral, Ottawa, while not having any official national status either secularly or ecclesially like that of Canterbury Cathedral in England and the Washington National Cathedral in the United States, is the usual venue for state occasions requiring an ecclesiastical setting, such as state funerals for non-Roman Catholics. Christ's Church Cathedral, Hamilton is the oldest cathedral of Upper Canada, its present building having originally been constructed in 1842, though its curious and evolutionary construction history has left none of the original fabric extant. Christ Church Cathedral, Montreal is notable for having a shopping mall (Promenades Cathédrale) and Metro station (McGill) underneath it.

=== Notable parishes ===
The Church of St. Mary Magdalene in Toronto was the home parish of the organist and composer Healey Willan, who composed much of his liturgical music for its choirs. It is the inspiration for the parish of St Aiden in Robertson Davies's novel The Cunning Man. The hymn tune "Bellwoods" by James Hopkirk, sung to the hymn "O day of God draw nigh", by the Canadian biblical scholar R. B. Y. Scott, was named for St. Matthias Bellwoods, in Toronto, where Hopkirk was organist. St John's, Elora, is a concert venue of the Elora Music Festival; its choir, also known as the Elora Festival Singers, is the professional core of the Toronto Mendelssohn Choir and its CDs are available around the world.

St. Thomas's, Huron Street, another notable parish church in Toronto, was at one time the parish church of the English accompanist Gerald Moore, serving there as an assistant organist, but is equally notable for being one of the most liturgically traditional Anglo-Catholic parishes in North America, earning recognition as a prominent "destination parish" in the Greater Toronto Area, as well as for its music program. St Anne's, Toronto is a notable tourist attraction, being "a scale model of Saint Sophia in Istanbul that was decorated in the 1920s by members of the Group of Seven and associates." Much of the artwork was lost in a 2024 fire that destroyed the church's main building.

His Majesty's Royal Chapel of the Mohawks in Brantford, Ontario, and Christ Church, His Majesty's Chapel Royal of the Mohawks, near Deseronto, Ontario, are two of only three Chapels Royal in Canada, the third being the interdenominational St Catharine's Chapel in Massey College, Toronto. Christ Church was granted royal status by Queen Elizabeth II in 2004, and St Catharine's in 2017. St Bartholomew's, Ottawa, located near to Rideau Hall and also known as the Guards Chapel has been the place of worship for Governors General of the Canadas and then Canada since 1866, before the wider confederation of the British North American colonies.

In April 2007 St. George's Church (Georgetown, Ontario) became the first church in Canada to join the Messy Church initiative which places a premium on community, creativity, hospitality and celebration. Messy Church had been born in the Church of England "Fresh Expressions" movement and was just beginning to spread.

Messy Church at St. George's made a connection with young families beyond the sacrament of baptism and built a community around it. St. George's continues to offer "Messy Church" services on the second Wednesday of each month at 5:00 p.m. (not during summer).

The oldest still standing Anglican Church in Canada is St Paul’s Church which is located in Parade Square, Halifax, Nova Scotia. It was founded in 1749, but the construction of the building began June 13 1750, and it opened for worship on September 3 1750. The design was based on the ground plan of St Peter’s Anglican Church on Vere Street in London, England.
