= Church of San Salvador =

Church of San Salvador may refer to:

- Church of San Salvador (Cifuentes)
- Church of San Salvador (Granada)
- Church of San Salvador (Guetaria)
- Church of San Salvador de Valdediós
- Church of San Salvador de Priesca
