= Church of the Holy Savior (Grahovac) =

Coordinates: 42°40′36.8″N 18°37′23.7″E

- Црква Светог Спаса
- Church of the Holy Savior
- Location: Grahovac, Herceg Novi
- Country: Montenegro
- Denomination: Serbian Orthodox

History
- Dedication: Holy Savior

Administration
- Archdiocese: Metropolitanate of Montenegro and the Littoral

The Church of the Holy Savior in Grahovac (Serbian Cyrillic: Црква Светог Спаса; Romanized: Crkva Svetog Spasa) was built as part of the great battle played in this place in 1858. It was built by order of King Nikola in 1864, in a symbolic way, because its construction began on Tuesday and ended on Thursday, on Savior's Day, just like the Battle of Grahovac. Its foundations were excavated at the site of the tent of Hussein Pasha, the commander of the Turkish army.

The Grahovac memorial church commemorates the men who were slain fighting the Turks at Grahovac in May 1858 when the Montenegrins overcame vastly superior odds .

The church is small in size, with a single nave base with a semicircular apse and a bell tower. A cross is carved on the overhead beam. The blind rosette is in the shape of a rudder and is installed in the middle of the facade. A memorial plaque was placed on the church, during the celebration of the centenary of the battle, with the inscription: "It is a monument to your heroism, Montenegro, and its freedom".

The iconostasis was made by Vaso Krstov Vujičić in 1907. The church also has significant ritual objects of Russian origin. Inside there is an iconostasis, which was also made in 1907 by Marko Đ. Vujovic from Cetinje.

It has been renovated in 2001, and is in good condition.
