= J. G. Waller =

Canadian Anglican minister

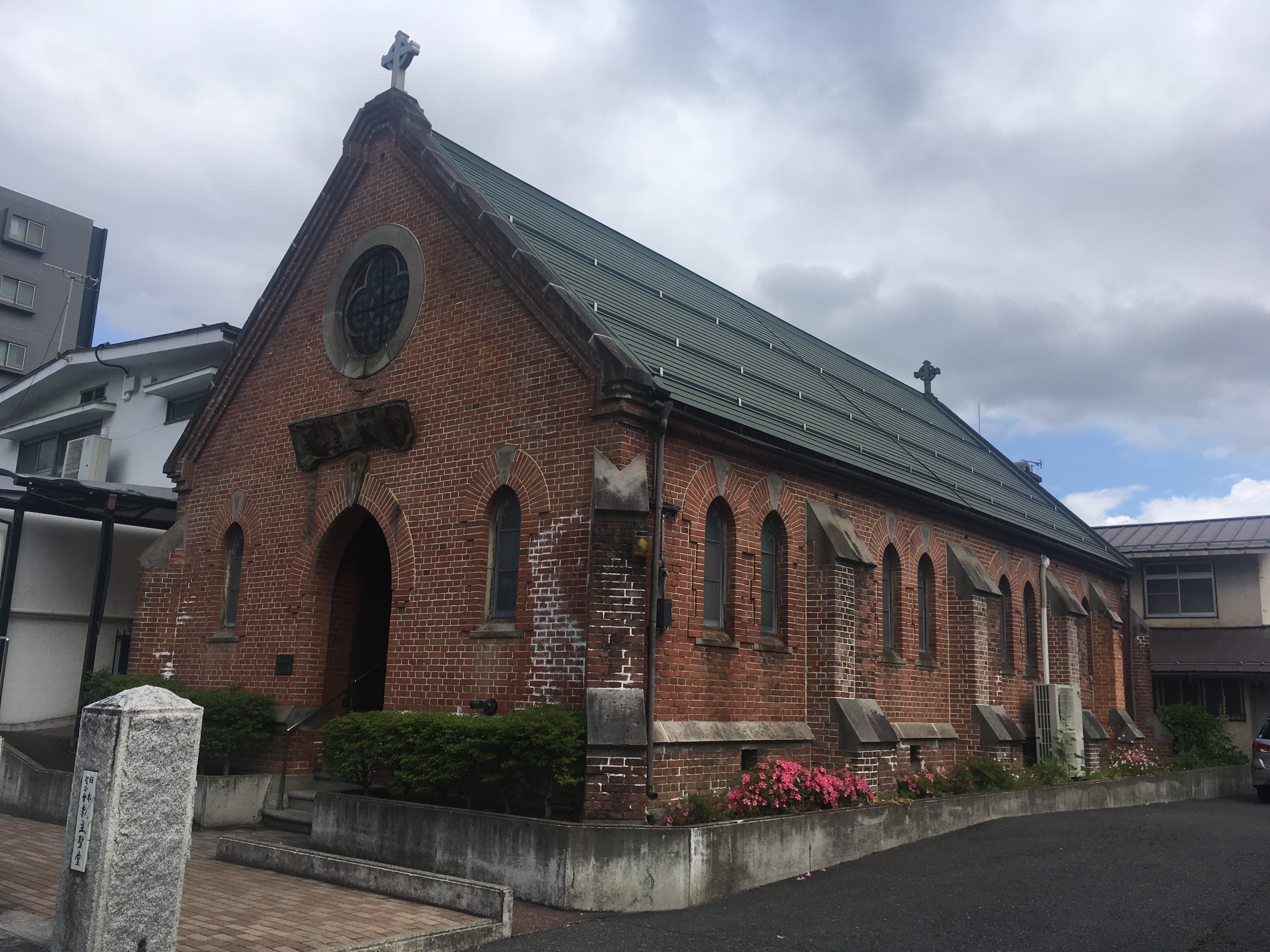
Nagano Holy Saviour Church, Nagano City (est. 1898)

Rev. John Gage Waller (26 January 1863 – 22 March 1945) was a minister of the Anglican Church of Canada who was active in the central region of Japan, Chubu, in particular in Nagano Prefecture on behalf of the Anglican Church in Japan.

Waller was born on a farm in southern Ontario in 1863. He studied at Trinity College, Toronto and was deputy pastor of St. Anne's Church in Canada. He became a deacon in 1887 and a priest in 1888. In 1890, Waller arrived in Japan as a missionary with his wife, Lydia Susan, of the Anglican Church of Canada first working in Tokyo and later in Fukushima Prefecture. In 1892, Waller arrived in Nagano where he established churches in Nagano City in 1898 (Nagano Holy Saviour Church), Mt. Inari (Chikuma) in 1931, Ueda, Iiyama, and in Takada (Jōetsu, Niigata). Waller established a neonatal clinic in Nagano and a sanatorium for tuberculosis patients in Obuse, Nagano. The hospital in Obuse, New Life Hospital, is the largest hospital in Obuse today. The church in Nagano City, the Nagano Holy Saviour's Church, was nationally registered as an important tangible cultural property in 2006.

The Canadian Anglican missionary work in Japan was unknown to most Canadians. In 1912, Waller wrote:

If the rest of Canada outside of Toronto heard of the Japanese work at all, they usually had the vaguest ideas about it... even clergymen wishing to introduce the missionary from Japan to their congregations, would ask beforehand in what part of China we had been working

Waller and his wife had five children born in Japan, Justin Benjamin, John Charles, George Awdry, Wilfred, and a daughter, Kiku. His wife, Lydia, died in Japan on January 9, 1938. At the beginning of the Pacific War, Waller was interned in the compound of the Canadian Academy in Kobe, and then repatriated to Canada in 1942. At that time, a daughter and one of his sons, Wilfred, were living in England, and another son was a prisoner of the Japanese after the fall of Singapore. Waller suffered a stroke in 1943 and died in Hamilton, Ontario in 1945.

== Other media ==
A book written in Japanese, Waller, His Life and Family (ウォーラー司祭 その生涯と家庭, Uo-ra- shisai, sono shōgai to katei) by Kobayashi Shirou (小林史郎) was published in 2006.
