= Gordon Light =

Canadian bishop

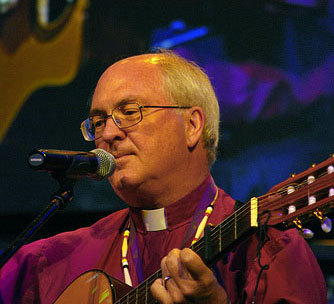
Image of Bishop Gordon Light

Gordon Stanley Light (b 1944) was bishop of the Anglican parishes of the central interior from 2004 until 2008.

Light was educated at Carleton University and Trinity College, Toronto; and ordained in 1969. After a curacy at St. Paul's Cathedral, Kamloops he was the incumbent at St George, Edmonton then St Luke, Winnipeg. In 1984 he became dean of Cariboo, a post he held until he was appointed principal secretary to the primate, Michael Peers in 1992.

Light is a founding member of The Common Cup Company. He is a singer, songwriter and plays acoustic guitar.

== Personal life ==
Bishop Light has four children and two stepchildren. He lives in Kamloops BC, with his wife Barbara Liotscos.
