= John Jackson (military chaplain) =

Anglican priest

John Jackson (fl. c. 1700 – 1717) was an Anglican priest who served as the first chaplain to the garrison at St John's, Newfoundland. He is credited with building the first Anglican church in Newfoundland and present-day Canada.

Jackson was appointed chaplain of the St. John's garrison in 1700 and sailed to Newfoundland with his wife and eight children in 1701. It is possible that Jackson also served as chaplain on Sir John Norris and Sir John Gibsone's 1697 expedition to the island. Initially, Jackson's salary of fifty pounds per annum depended on tithes from the civilian population, but by 1703 he was recognized by the Society for the Propagation of the Gospel in Foreign Parts.

He arrived to a tense atmosphere, pitting officers against their soldiers and the town's civilians. Jackson consistently opposed the officers and was accused of sowing "discord among the inhabitants". Jackson repeatedly wrote to his superiors in England complaining about the behaviour of the officers, including Michael Richards and Thomas Lloyd.

Over the winter of 1704–1705 a group of officers, including Richards and Lloyd, complained to the Board of Trade in London that Jackson was a disruptive influence and requested his recall. In 1705 Jackson and his family (now eleven children) left Newfoundland aboard Falkland. The ship ran aground in Sandwich Bay, Kent. There were no deaths, but the family lost most of their possessions.

In 1709 Jackson took a post as curate in Dursley, Gloucestershire. He married a woman named Mary Bissett in 1710. (The fate of his first wife is unknown; she may have died in Newfoundland.) In the same year, he became rector of Uley.
