= Church of San Salvador (Granada) =

Church in Granada, Spain

- Iglesia de El Salvador
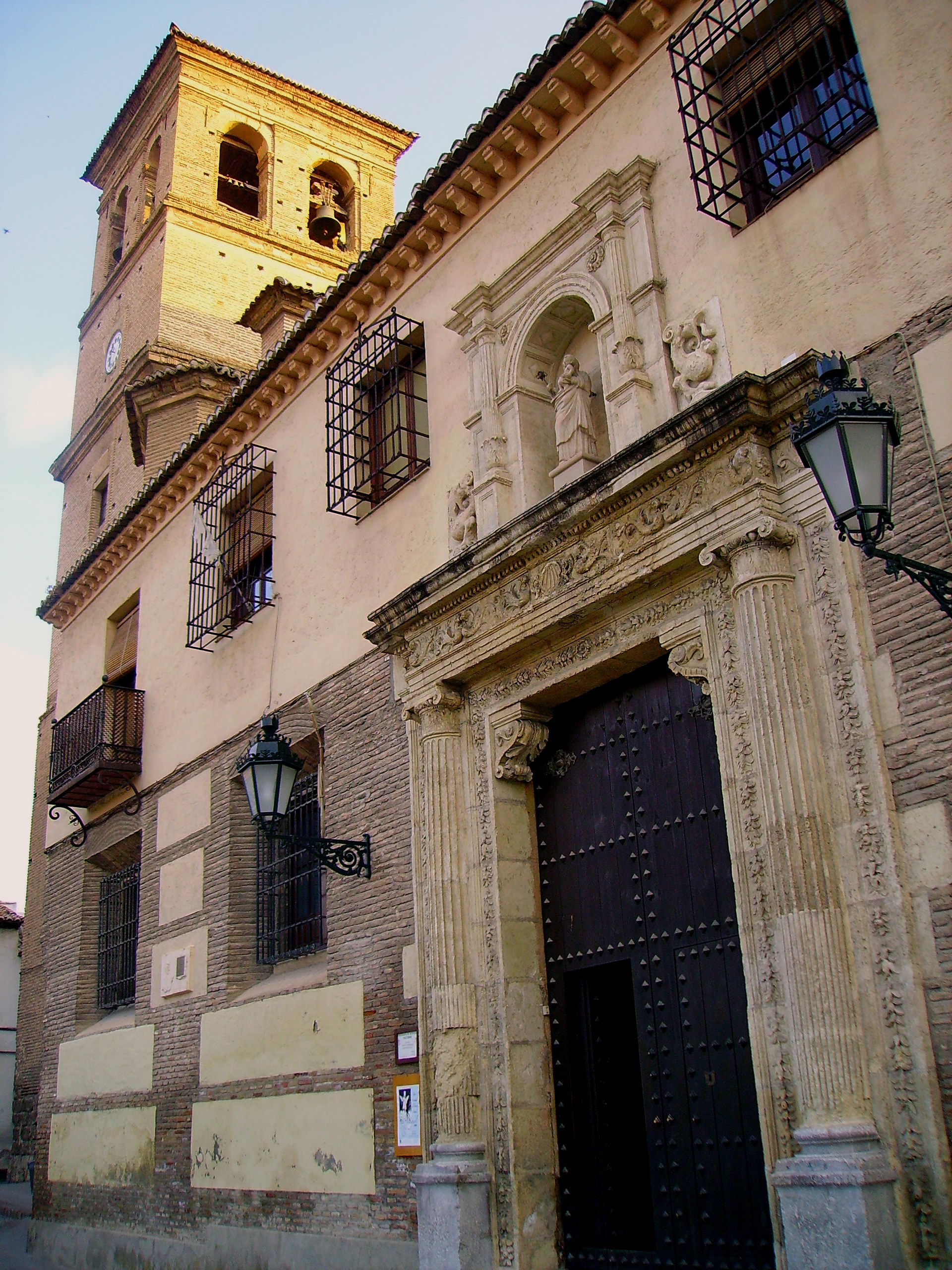
- Church exterior, with entrance portal and bell tower visible

Religion
- Affiliation: Catholic
- Year consecrated: 1499

Location
- Location: Granada, Spain
- Interactive map of Church of San Salvador
- Coordinates: 37°10′56.2″N 3°35′28.7″W

Architecture
- Type: Church
- Style: Mudéjar, Renaissance
- Groundbreaking: 1565
- Completed: circa 1610

The Church of San Salvador (Spanish: Iglesia de El Salvador), also known as the Church of El Salvador or Collegiate Church of San Salvador, is a church and historic monument in Granada, Spain. The church is located in the historic Albaicín neighbourhood, at Plaza del Salvador (off Cuesta del Chapiz street). It was built in the 16th century on the site of the neighbourhood's former main mosque and incorporates some of its remains.

== History ==
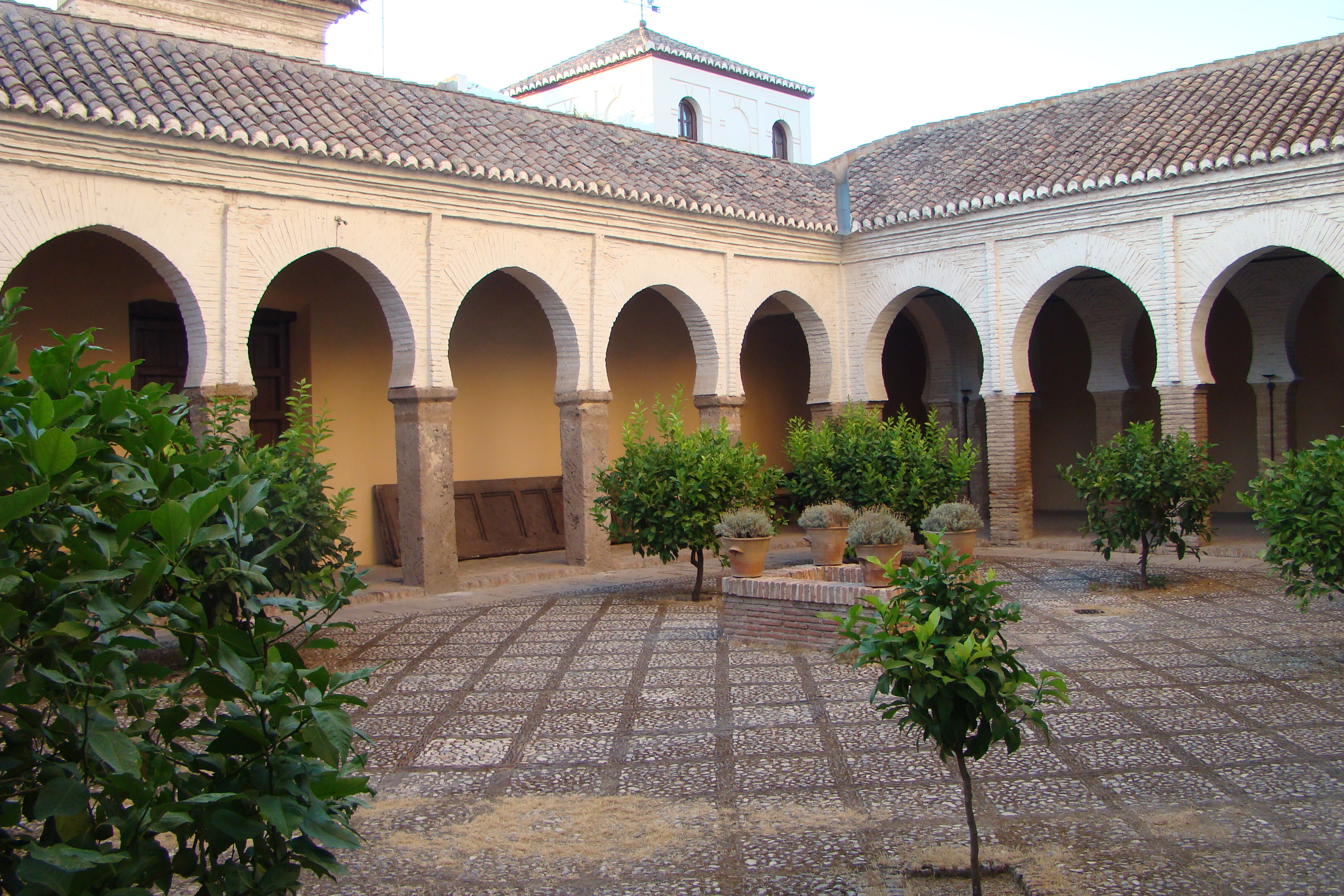
The courtyard of the church is preserved from the original mosque (though restored in the 20th century)

Prior to the current church, the site was occupied by the Great Mosque of the Albaicin (Arabic: مسجد الجامع البيازين, romanized: Masjid al-Jāmi' al-Bayyāzīn). The mosque was built in the 13th century under Almohad rule. Only its courtyard (sahn), with arcades of horseshoe arches, has been preserved today as part of the church. The mosque originally covered a total area measuring 42.4 by 32.2 metres. Its prayer hall, now disappeared, had a hypostyle form similar to the city's larger Great Mosque on the site of the current Cathedral. It had 9 aisles divided by rows of arches supported by 86 marble columns, with the central aisle being wider than the others. The courtyard was planted with lemon trees. Across the street from the mosque, there originally stood an Islamic primary school and a khan (urban caravanserai).

After the conquest of Granada in 1492 by the Catholic Monarchs of Spain, the building remained a mosque for several years. It was consecrated as a church in 1499 by Cardinal Cisneros, in violation of the city's terms of surrender. It became a parish church in 1501, in the context of the forced conversions that followed the Rebellion of the Alpujarras and the creation of 23 new parishes. In 1527, it was granted the status of a collegiate church by a papal bull of Clement VII, to facilitate the indoctrination of the local Moriscos.

A new church building was constructed in the 16th century to replace the mosque structure. Initially, in the first decades following its consecration, the building was expanded with the addition of new rooms and of a new lateral entrance. The new entrance portal was completed in 1543 by Esteban Sánchez under the direction of Diego Siloe. In 1565, work began on replacing the old building entirely. First built was the chancel, which was completed in 1592. It was designed by architect Juan de la Maeda, a student of Siloe, and executed by stonemasons Juan Martínez (up to 1576) and Juan de la Vega (after 1576). The church's bell tower was also completed around 1592 and is attributed to architect Ambrosio de Vico. By the end of the century, the rest of the mosque was demolished and work on the new nave was carried out around 1610. The northwestern portal, leading to the cloister, also dates from the 17th century. Construction work was slowed considerably by the economic devastation caused by the Morisco rebellion of 1568 and the subsequent expulsion of the Moriscos from Granada, which depleted the neighbourhood's population (which was largely composed of Moriscos until then). This also caused the building itself to be completed with a less ambitious architectural design than initially envisioned.

The church underwent multiple vicissitudes in the following centuries. After the damage caused by the 1755 Lisbon earthquake, the church's college of canons had to move to different churches, until eventually they were officially moved to the Church of San Pablo in 1771. At this point, San Salvador ceased to be a collegiate church and resumed its original role as an important parish church.

The church was almost completely destroyed by a fire in 1936, in the context of anti-clerical riots. In addition to the structural damage, many of its artworks and furnishings were lost. Reconstruction began in 1937 under the direction of architect Fernando Wilhelmi and continued in multiple phases afterward. The courtyard, which mostly still dates to the former mosque, was reconstructed in the 1950s. The last major restoration was carried on the front of the church in 1996.

== Architecture ==
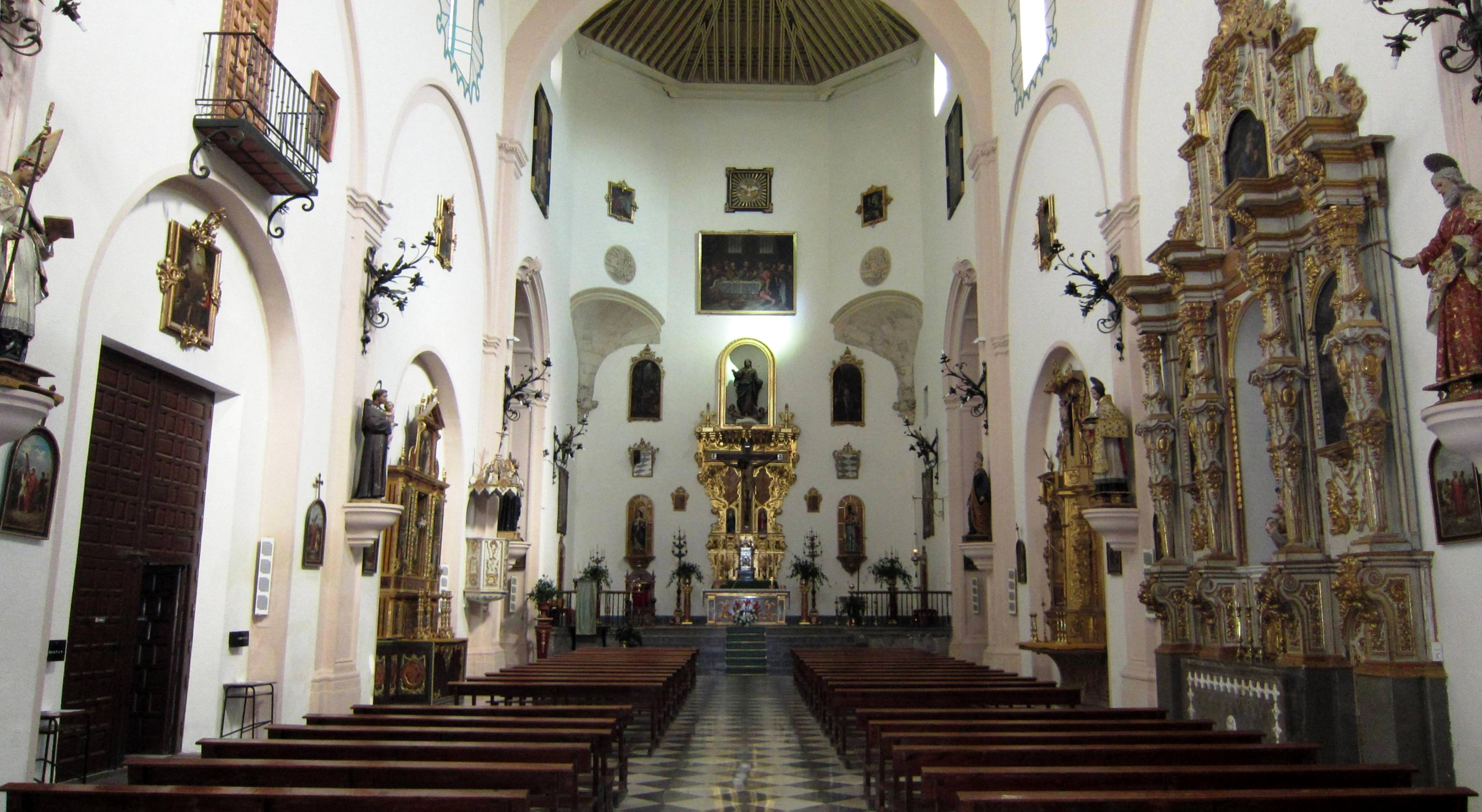
Interior of the nave today

The architectural style of the church is a mix of the traditional Mudéjar style of Granada and the new classicizing Renaissance style associated with the contemporary El Escorial. The original architectural ambition for the church was most likely compromised by the crises that beset Granada during the time of its construction.

The entire building occupies a rectangular space measuring about 30 metres (98 ft) wide by 53 metres (174 ft) long. The church has a single nave, preceded to the northwest by a courtyard (originally the courtyard of the mosque) and leading to the chancel and altar at the southeast end. The courtyard measures 30 by 19 metres (98 by 62 ft) and is lined on three sides by arcades of horseshoe arches. The main nave building measures around 12 by 41 metres (39 by 135 ft). The chancel is demarcated from the rest of the nave by a large arch. Two chapels open onto its sides and two other closed chapels are located in the back. A series of other rooms, intended for the college of canons, stretch along the northeastern side of the building, near the main entrance portal.

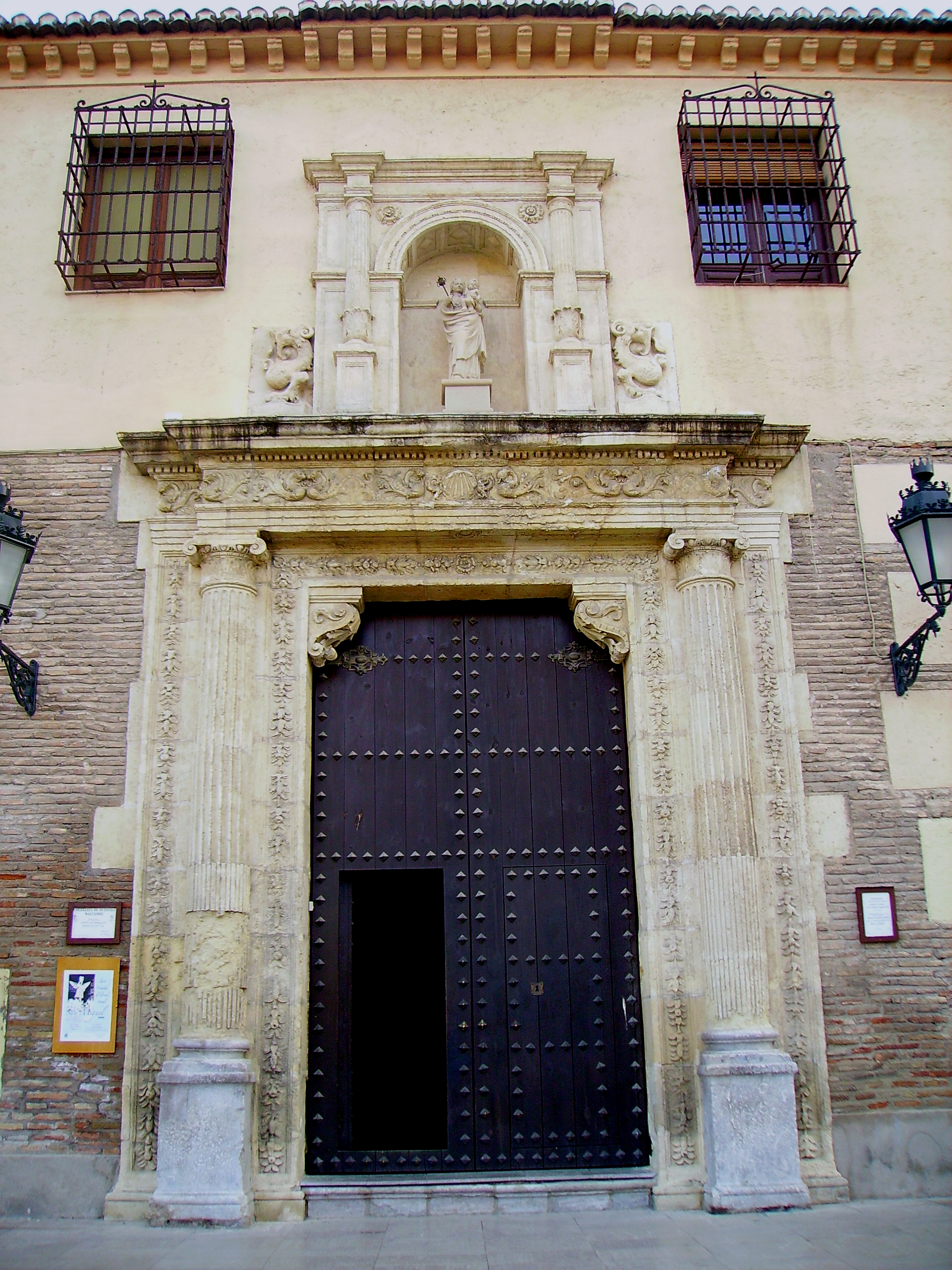
The Plateresque entrance portal, dating to 1543

The vaulted ceiling of the nave, originally a traditional wood-frame construction (known as armadura), was replaced by cement vaults after the 1936 fire. The chancel was most likely intended to be covered by a stone vault during the original construction, but due to the fiscal shortfalls it was replaced by a simpler octagonal wooden ceiling instead. The current ceiling here is a cement imitation of the original, also made after 1936.

The main entrance portal on the northeast side, still dates from 1543. It reflects the ornate Granadan Plateresque style of Diego Siloe, as well as the greater architectural rigour of construction prior to the city's economic crisis later that century. It was restored in 1996. The niche above the door contains a stone replica of what was previously a wooden sculpture of the Virgin and Child.
