= Book of Alternative Services =

Liturgical book in the Anglican Church of Canada

The Book of Alternative Services (BAS) is the contemporary, inclusive-language liturgical book used in place of the 1962 Book of Common Prayer (BCP) in most parishes of the Anglican Church of Canada.
