= Melanie Delva =

Canadian Anglican archivist and reconciliation animator

- Occupation: Archivist Reconciliation Animator
- Writing career
- Language: English

Melanie Delva is the Reconciliation Animator for the Anglican Church of Canada.

== Life ==
Delva is a first-generation Canadian of Belgian descent. She was raised in rural Manitoba on Treaty 4 territory. Her work around reconciliation contributed to her adoption by Coyote Terry Aleck and Christine Turenne into the Grizzly Clan of the Lytton Band of the Nlaka’pamux First Nation. She holds a bachelor of arts from Dalhousie University and a Masters in Archival Studies in 2005 from the University of British Columbia. She currently lives in Vancouver, British Columbia.

Delva has spoken openly about mental health stigma, her diagnoses of depression, and the role faith has played in her mental health. She has also known for her work dismantling white privilege and relationship building in the context of reconciliation.

== Career ==
From 2005 to 2017 Delva served as the Archivist for the Anglican Diocese of New Westminster and the Archivist for the Provincial Synod of British Columbia and Yukon. During her time as an archivist, Delva was part of a pilot project undertaken by the Truth and Reconciliation Commission of Canada (TRC) for its document collection related to records about Residential Schools. Delva has been involved in a range of archival organizations including: the Archives Association of British Columbia, the Response to the Report of the Truth and Reconciliation Commission Taskforce, and the Association of Canadian Archivists.

In June 2017, Delva was appointed as the Reconciliation Animator for the Anglican Church of Canada. In this role Delva oversees the Anglican Church's implementation of the TRC's Calls to Action. In her role as Reconciliation Animator Delva helped author the One Step on a Journey: The Indian Residential Schools Settlement Agreement and the Anglican Church of Canada—Lessons Learned report which documents the role of reconciliation work within the Anglican Church. In 2019, Delva was elected as the lay alternative to the Anglican Consultative Council. Delva regularly provides sermons and speaks about reconciliation at Anglican Churches and church events across Canada.

== Publications ==
- "Decolonizing the Prisons of Cultural Identity: Denominational Archives and Indigenous “Manifestations of Culture,” Toronto Journal of Theology 34, no.1 (2018).
- With Melissa Adams, "Archival ethics and Indigenous justice: conflict or coexistence?" in Engaging with Records and Archives Histories and Theories eds. Fiorella Foscarini, Healther MacNeil, Bonnie Mak and Gillian Oliver, (London: Facet Publishing, 2016).

== Presentations ==
- Presentation on the Doctrine of Discovery, Clergy Conference, Anglican Diocese of Caledonia, 2019.
- Archives Association of British Columbia Roundtable: Poor Little Photos, 2014.
- "Journey to Reconciliation: Church Records and the Indian Residential Schools Legacy," Association of Canadian Archivists, 2013.
- "Repentance for Stolen Land & Stolen People," Racial Heresy Podcast
