= Nagano Holy Saviour Church =

Church in Nagano, Japan

Coordinates: 36°39′22.6″N 138°10′55.5″E

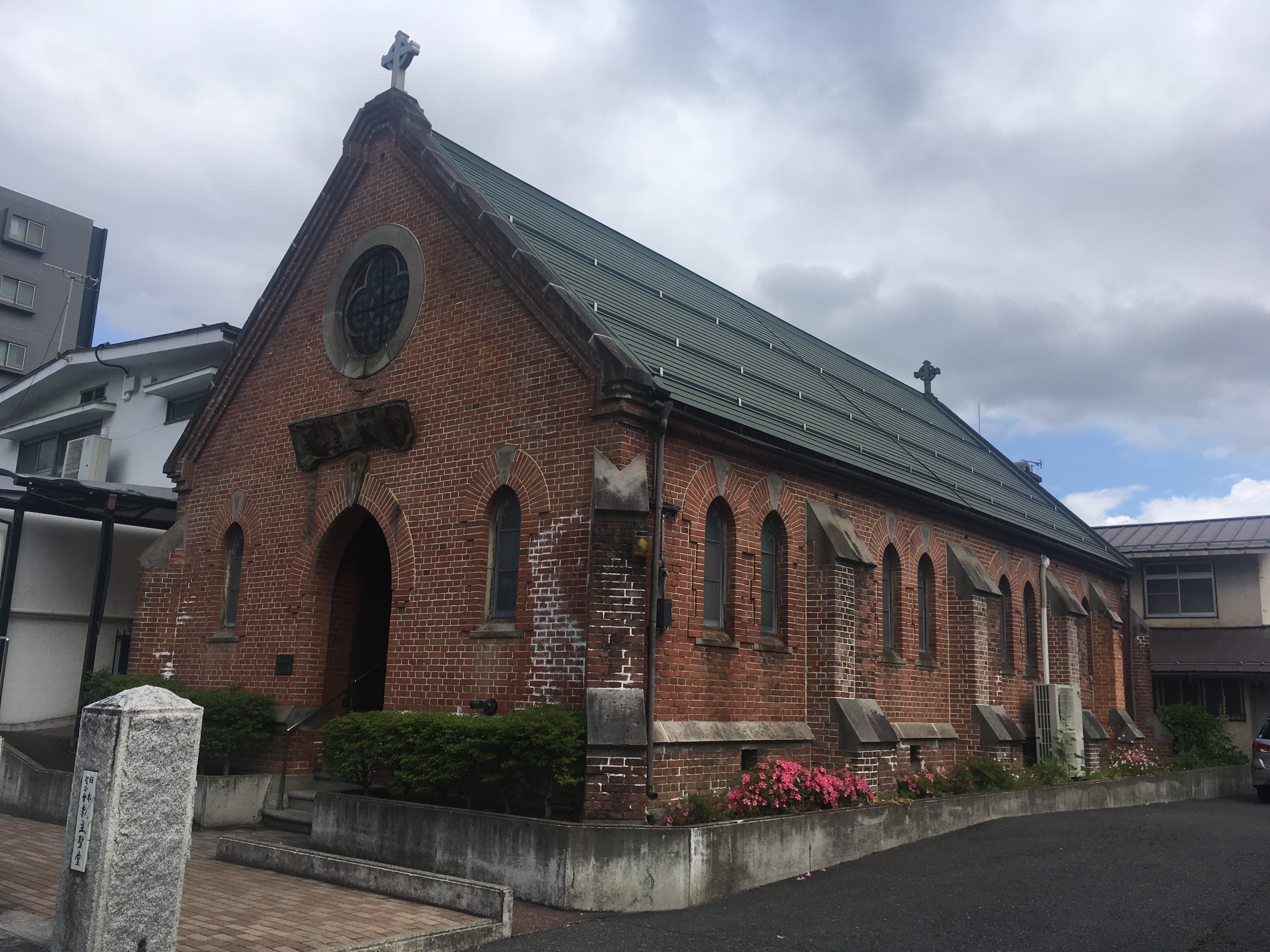
Nagano Holy Saviour Church, Nagano, Japan

Nagano Holy Saviour Church is the Christian church located in Nagano, Nagano, Japan, which belongs to the Diocese of Chubu of the Anglican Church in Japan. The church building is a registered Tangible Cultural Property of Japan.

== Overview ==
The Holy Saviour Church in Nagano, Nagano, was the first church established in 1898 by the Canadian missionary, Rev. John Gage Waller (1863-1945), who had come to Japan in 1890 and to Nagano Prefecture in 1892. It is a prominent red brick building standing on National Route 406 near the Zenko-ji Temple's main gate, and has long been familiar to the citizens of Nagano.

On June 18, 1998, the centennial service was held, with the Canadian guests related to Rev. Waller. A book in Japanese by Shiro Kobayashi on Rev. Waller and his family was published in 2006.

The other churches that were established by Rev. Waller include: the Resurrection Church in Iiyama; the All Saints Church in Inariyama, Chikuma (both registered Tangible Cultural Properties); and the Advent Church in Takada, Joetsu, architected by Merrell Vories.

The Holy Saviour Church is at 6, Nishi-Nagano, Nagano City, Nagano Prefecture, and the paster is Rev. Maria Reiko Yamato. On Sundays, 10:00 a.m. Holy Communion or the Word of God service

== Gallery ==
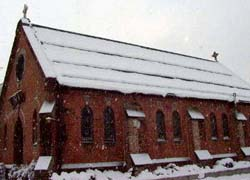
Nagano Holy Saviour Church, in Winter

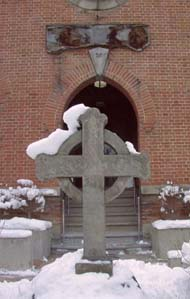
Nagano Holy Saviour Church, with the Cross

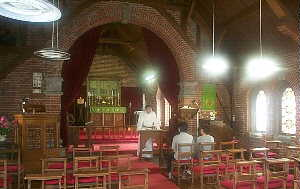
Inside the Nagano Holy Saviour Church

The Centennial Worship (June 18, 1998): Bishop Noriaki Mori'a Sermon

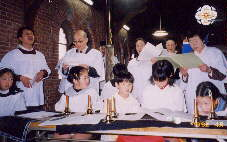
The Centennial Worship: The Choir

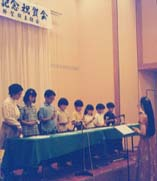
The Centennial Worship: The Sunday School Children's Handbells

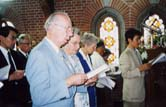
The Centennial Worship, with several Canadians' participation

== See also ==
- Nippon Sei Ko Kai
