= General Synod of the Anglican Church of Canada =

Governing body of the Canadian Anglican Church

Logo of the 2007 General Synod of the Anglican Church of Canada

The General Synod of the Anglican Church of Canada is the chief governing and legislative body of the Anglican Church of Canada (ACC), the sole Canadian representative of the Anglican Communion. The first General Synod session was held in Toronto in 1893, with the proviso that the parameters of its authority would not undermine the local independence of dioceses.

== Composition and responsibilities ==
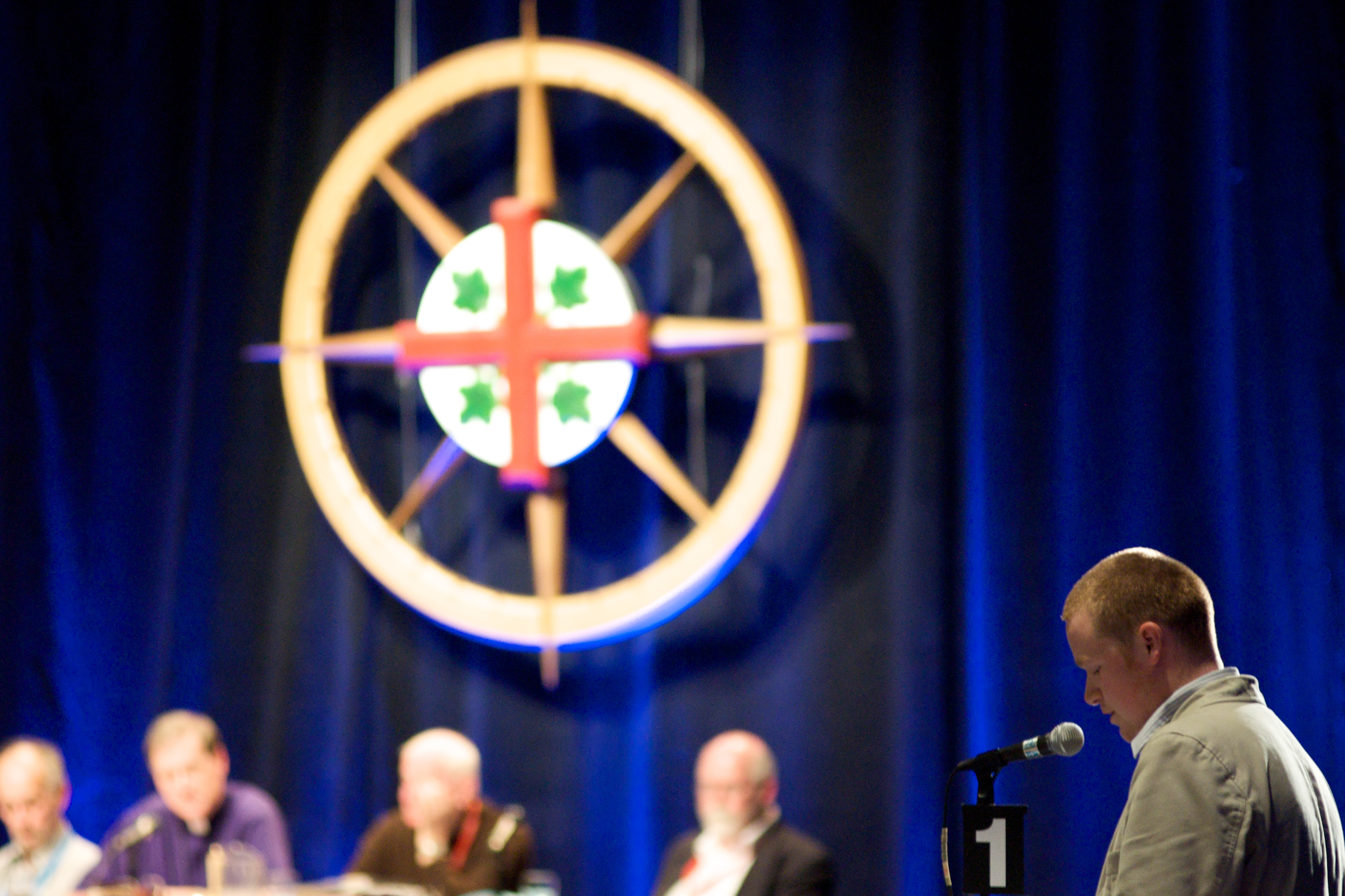
General Synod debate, Halifax 2010

Except in special instances when it may be called into session by the Primate of the Anglican Church of Canada or the Council of General Synod, the General Synod meets triennially at locations across Canada.

The General Synod is composed of three Orders: Bishops, Clergy, and Laity. All bishops and archbishops of the ACC are members of General Synod; clergy and lay delegates are elected from each of the church's thirty dioceses, as well as the Canadian Forces and the religious orders. Unlike the Episcopal Church in the United States of America, the Orders are not divided into Houses which meet separately according to different rules of order. Nonetheless, voting may be done by Orders with respect to certain issues, or on demand according to the rules of order, under which conditions a given Resolution would need to be approved in all three.

The General Synod is responsible for articulating the doctrine, discipline, and worship of the Anglican Church of Canada. During its regular meetings, which generally span a week to nine days, members exchange information, set policy for the church, pass resolutions, and enact and amend canon law. Presently, there are twenty-two numbered canons, dealing with issues as prosaic as the name of the church, to ones touching on doctrine, such as matrimony, to judicial disciplinary proceedings.

== Previous Sessions of General Synod ==
Session	Year	Location
44th	2025	London, Ontario
43rd	2023	Calgary, Alberta (Meeting in Assembly together with the National Convention of the Evangelical Lutheran Church in Canada)
42nd	2019	Vancouver, British Columbia
41st	2016	Richmond Hill, Ontario
40th	2013	Ottawa, Ontario (Meeting in Joint Assembly with the National Convention of the Evangelical Lutheran Church in Canada)
39th	2010	Halifax, Nova Scotia
38th	2007	Winnipeg, Manitoba
37th	2004	St. Catharines, Ontario
36th	2001	Waterloo, Ontario
35th	1998	Montreal, Quebec
34th	1995	Ottawa, Ontario
33rd	1992	Toronto, Ontario
32nd	1989	St. John's, Newfoundland and Labrador
31st	1986	Winnipeg, Manitoba
30th	1983	Fredericton, New Brunswick
29th	1980	Peterborough, Ontario
28th	1977	Calgary, Alberta
27th	1975	Quebec City, Quebec
26th	1973	Regina, Saskatchewan
25th	1971	Niagara Falls, Ontario
24th	1969	Sudbury, Ontario
23rd	1967	Calgary, Alberta
22nd	1965	Vancouver, British Columbia
21st	1962	Kingston, Ontario
20th	1959	St. Anne de Bellevue, Quebec (First General Synod as the Anglican Church of Canada)
19th	1955	Edmonton, Alberta (Last General Synod as the Church of England in Canada)
18th	1952	London, Ontario
17th	1949	Halifax, Nova Scotia
16th	1946	Winnipeg, Manitoba
15th	1943	Toronto, Ontario
14th	1937	Halifax, Nova Scotia
13th	1934	Montreal, Quebec
12th	1931	Toronto, Ontario
11th	1927	Kingston, Ontario
10th	1924	London, Ontario
9th	1921	Hamilton, Ontario
8th	1918	Toronto, Ontario
7th	1915	Toronto, Ontario
6th	1911	London, Ontario
5th	1908	Ottawa, Ontario
4th	1905	Quebec City, Quebec
3rd	1902	Montreal, Quebec
2nd	1896	Winnipeg, Manitoba
1st	1893	Toronto, Ontario

== Officers of General Synod and the Council of General Synod ==
General Synod elects three of the nine officers who maintain certain executive responsibilities at and between Synods. Of those, one - the Primate - holds office until he or she resigns, is removed, retires, or dies. The other officers, elected at each General Synod, are the Prolocutor and the Deputy Prolocutor.

The Prolocutor acts as the chief deputy to the Primate, and the second executive officer of General Synod. As such, he or she chairs sessions of General Synod and meetings of the Council of General Synod in the absence of the Primate. The current Prolocutor is Ian Alexander; the Deputy Prolocutor is Tanya Phibbs.

=== Council of General Synod ===
Between sessions of General Synod, the Council of General Synod (CoGS) administers the affairs of the ACC. CoGS is composed of the Primate, the Prolocutor, the Deputy Prolocutor, the Chancellor, and representatives from the three Orders from each of the four ecclesiastical provinces, chosen by the respective delegates at General Synod, the numbers of which vary according to a complicated electoral formula. CoGS appoints four of the nine officers of General Synod:

- The General Secretary
- The Treasurer
- The Chancellor
- The Vice-Chancellor, if appointed

It also elects two Officers-at-large (one Clergy, one Laity).

== Committees of General Synod ==
General Synod has six standing committees, consisting of members both elected at General Synod and appointed by the Primate:

- Faith, Worship and Ministry Committee: Responsible for liturgical issues;
- Partners in Mission Committee: Responsible for relationships with Anglican and ecumenical churches and organisations overseas;
- Eco-Justice Committee: Responsible for social and environmental issues;
- Pension Committee: Responsible for clergy and staff pension administration;
- Financial Management and Development Committee: Responsible for the ACC's financial affairs;
- Communications and Information Resources Committee: Responsible for the communications and publications of the ACC, including the Anglican Journal newspaper.

== Important acts of recent General Synods ==
- 1995: General Synod approves the publication of a new hymnal, the first since 1971. Published in 1998, under the title Common Praise.
- 2001: General Synod approves full communion with the Evangelical Lutheran Church in Canada, under the provisions of the Waterloo Declaration.
- 2004: Andrew Hutchison is elected twelfth Primate of the Anglican Church of Canada. Synod votes to affirm "the integrity and sanctity of committed adult same-sex relationships."
- 2007: Fred Hiltz was elected the thirteenth primate of the Anglican Church of Canada. Synod approved the "St. Michael Report", accepting that the blessing of same-sex unions is not a matter of "core doctrine" but rejected a motion that would have authorized dioceses to bless same-sex unions. The motion was passed by the clergy and laity, but was narrowly defeated by the House of Bishops. General Synod, however, approved a motion calling for "pastoral care" of same-sex couples and called on the Primate's Theological Commission to recommend changes to the Marriage Canon to permit the marriage of all couples entitled under Canadian civil law (thus including gays and lesbians).
- 2016: A resolution for the first reading of the amendment to Canon XXI (On Marriage in the Church) was passed, after it was originally reported to have failed by one vote in the order of clergy. The amendment would have changed the wording of the canon to include same-sex relationships. The amendment was then put forward to be read a second time at General Synod in 2019, in accordance with the Declaration of Principles.
- 2019: A resolution for the second reading of the amendment to Canon XXI, was defeated narrowly when less than the required two-thirds voted in favour of the resolution in the Order of Bishops. Linda Nicholls was also elected fourteenth Primate of the Anglican Church of Canada, and the first woman to be elected to that office.
- 2023: A resolution to amend Canon III (The Primate), was defeated twice. The resolution would have allowed the extension of a Primate's term past the mandatory retirement age of 70, if General Synod fell within a year of their reaching that age.
- 2025: Shane Parker was elected as the fifteenth Primate of the Anglican Church of Canada.
