= E.R. Fairweather =

Canadian theologian and academic (1920–2002)

Eugene Rathbone Fairweather
- Born: 2 November 1920; Ottawa, Ontario, Canada
- Died: 6 April 2002 (aged 81); Kentville, Nova Scotia, Canada
- Occupation: Theologian

Eugene Rathbone Fairweather (2 November 1920 – 6 April 2002) was a Canadian Anglican theologian.

== Early life ==
Eugene Fairweather was born in Ottawa, Ontario and grew up in Montreal. He was educated at McGill University (BA 1941), the University of Toronto (MA 1943), Trinity College (Toronto) (BD 1944), and Union Theological Seminary (STM, ThD 1949), where he undertook doctoral studies under the supervision of Paul Tillich and Reinhold Niebuhr. During his time in New York he served as an assistant priest at the Cathedral of St John the Divine.

== Career ==
Upon the completion of his doctorate in 1949 he returned to Trinity College in Toronto to teach, and in 1964 became the Keble Professor of Divinity. He continued to teach there until his retirement in 1986. He served for many years as an assistant priest at the Church of St Mary Magdalene.

He had a strong focus on certain major theological thinkers in the tradition of the Western Church such as Augustine, Anselm, and Aquinas, but at the same time exhibited a lively interest in (and wrote about) many important figures in the history of Canadian Anglicanism, such as John Strachan, John Medley, Tully Kingdon, and Harold Hamilton.

He served at various times as the President of the Canadian Society of Biblical Studies, the Canadian Theological Society, and the American Theological Society, and was also the Editor of the Canadian Journal of Theology from 1960 to 1970.

He was a Fellow of the Royal Society of Canada, as well as an honorary doctor of McGill University in Montreal (DD), the University of King's College in Halifax (DD), and Huron College in London, Ontario (DD).

For many years he was a member of the Faith and Order Commission of the World Council of Churches and a Patron of the Tantur Ecumenical Institute. He was in addition an official Anglican observer at the Second Vatican Council as well as a participant in the Anglican-Roman Catholic International Commission, in connexion with which the Cross of St Augustine was conferred upon him in 1981 by the Archbishop of Canterbury (Robert Runcie).

He died in 2002 in Kentville, Nova Scotia.

== See also ==
- Trinity College, Toronto
- Toronto School of Theology
- Canadian Journal of Theology
- Church of St John the Evangelist (Montreal)
- St Matthew's Church (Toronto)
- Cathedral of St John the Divine (New York)
- Church of St Mary Magdalene (Toronto)
- Existential Thomism
