= Anglican Centre in Rome =

Anglican Centre in Rome is an ecumenical organisation that is dedicated to improving relations between the Anglican Communion and the Roman Catholic Church. It was founded in 1966 with the encouragement of Michael Ramsey, Archbishop of Canterbury, and Pope Paul VI on the wave of ecumenical enthusiasm engendered by the Second Vatican Council and the birth of the Anglican–Roman Catholic International Commission.

The Centre is housed by the Doria Pamphilj family in Palazzo Doria Pamphilj, Piazza del Collegio Romano in historic Rome.

== Director ==
The Director of the Centre is also the Archbishop of Canterbury's Representative to the Holy See; they have always been Anglican clergy and often bishops. The current director is Anthony Ball, previously a canon of Westminster Abbey and bishop of North Africa in the Episcopal/Anglican Province of Alexandria.

=== List of Directors ===
Years	Director	Previous Position(s)
1970–1981	Harry Smythe	Previously Vice-Warden of St John's College, Morpeth and Tutor in Theology at the University of Melbourne.
1981–1991	Howard Root	Dean of Emmanuel College, Cambridge, then Professor of Theology, Southampton University
1991–1995	Douglas Brown SSM	Previously Academic Dean of Adelaide College of Divinity.
1995–1999	Bruce Ruddock	Later Canon of Worcester and of Peterborough
1999–2001	John Baycroft	Previously Bishop of Ottawa, Canada
2001–2003	Richard Garrard	Previously Bishop of Penrith, England
2003–2008	John Flack	Previously Bishop of Huntingdon, England
2008–2013	David Richardson	Previously Dean of Melbourne, Australia
2013–2017	Sir David Moxon	Archbishop emeritus of New Zealand and former Primate
2017–2018	Bernard Ntahoturi	Previously Archbishop of Burundi and Bishop of Matana
2019–2025	Ian Ernest	Previously Archbishop of the Indian Ocean and Bishop of Mauritius
2025–present	Anthony Ball	Previously Bishop of North Africa and Archdeacon of Westminster
