= Charles Hamilton (bishop) =

Canadian Anglican bishop

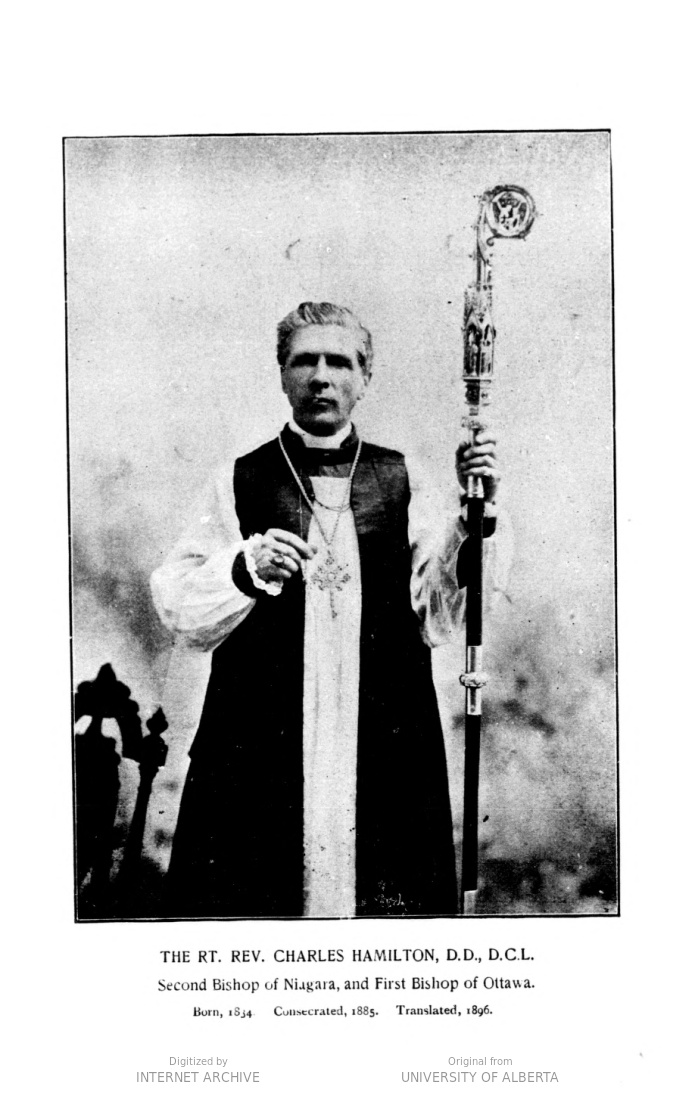
- Born: 1834
- Died: 1919 (aged 84–85); Ottawa, Ontario, Canada
- Education: University College, Oxford
- Occupations: priest, bishop
- Spouse: Frances Louisa Hume Thomson

Ordination history of Charles Hamilton

Charles Hamilton (1834–1919) was a Canadian Anglican bishop who was the first Archbishop of Ottawa, Ontario and Metropolitan of Canada.

Hamilton was educated at the High School of Montreal and University College, Oxford. He was a curate of Quebec cathedral and then incumbent of St Peter's Church in the same city. In 1884, he became the Bishop of Niagara. He was translated to become the Bishop of Ottawa in 1896 and was additionally elected as the Metropolitan of Canada in 1909 and then of Ontario in 1912. He died in 1919.

== Family ==
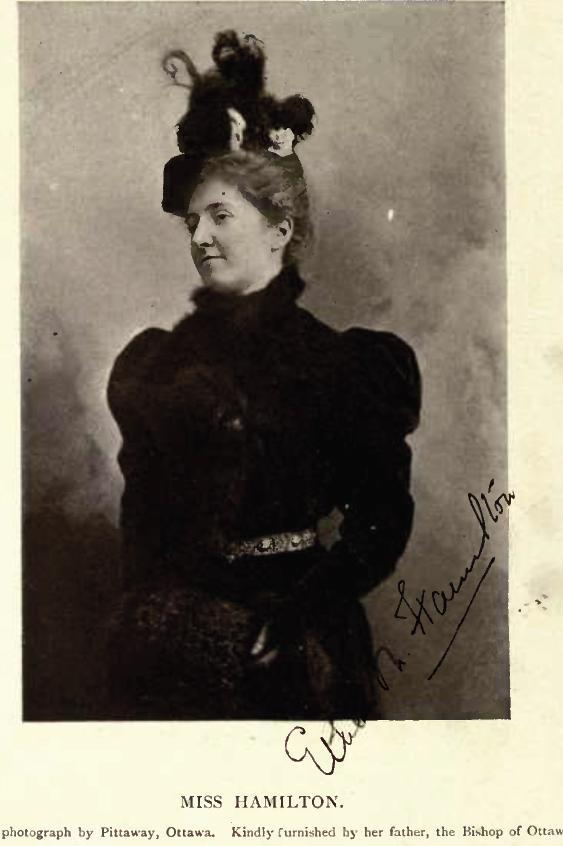
Ethel Mary Hamilton, daughter

Hamilton married Frances Louisa Hume Thomson, daughter of Tannatt Houston Thomson, Commissary-General of Canada, and his wife, Margaret Anne Ussher, the sister of Edgeworth Ussher. They lived at Bishopscourt, Ottawa, and were the parents of nine children: Charles Robert Hamilton, K.C. of Nelson, B.C.; Lilian Margaret (wife of Lenox I. Smith of Ottawa); Mabel Frances (wife of Edward Kirwan Martin of Hamilton, Ontario); Ethel Mary Hamilton; Hubert Valentine Hamilton; Winifred Katharine Hamilton; the Revd Harold Francis Hamilton (Professor of Pastoral Theology, Bishop's College, Lenoxville, Quebec); Mary Agnes (Molly) (actress in New York and London and correspondent of George Bernard Shaw); Lt. Col. George Theodore Hamilton of Ottawa and Victoria, B.C.

Ethel Mary Hamilton was born and educated in Quebec. She accompanied her parents on her father's election to the bishopric of the Ottawa, Ontario diocese in 1896. On May Day, 1898, at Government House, Ethel Mary Hamilton was elected and crowned "May Queen". She presided over the May Court Club, which had been established by the Earl and Countess of Aberdeen from 1896 until 1900.

Church of England titles
Preceded by Thomas Brock Fuller	Bishop of Niagara; 1884 –1896	Succeeded by John Philip Du Moulin
Preceded by Inaugural appointment	Bishop of Ottawa; 1896 –1914	Succeeded by John Charles Roper
Preceded by Arthur Sweatman	Metropolitan of Canada; 1909 –1912	Succeeded by Clarendon Lamb Worrell
Preceded by Inaugural appointment	Metropolitan of Ontario; 1912 –1914	Succeeded by George Thorneloe
