= Lionel Renfrey =

Australian Anglican bishop

Lionel Edward William Renfrey (1916–2008) was an Australian Anglican bishop. He was the Dean of Adelaide from 1966 until 1997.

Renfrey was educated at the University of Adelaide and ordained in 1940. After a curacy in Prospect, South Australia he was with the Bush Brotherhood of St John Baptist until 1947. Following this he was priest in charge of Berri; the incumbent at Kensington Gardens then Mile End. He was an assistant bishop of the Anglican Diocese of Adelaide in 1988. He was consecrated a bishop on 1 May 1969 at St Peter's Cathedral, Adelaide.

Religious titles
Preceded by Arthur Weston	Dean of Adelaide; 1966–1997	Succeeded by David Richardson
