= St Peter's Cathedral, Adelaide =

Church in South Australia

St Peter's Cathedral
- Cathedral Church of St Peter
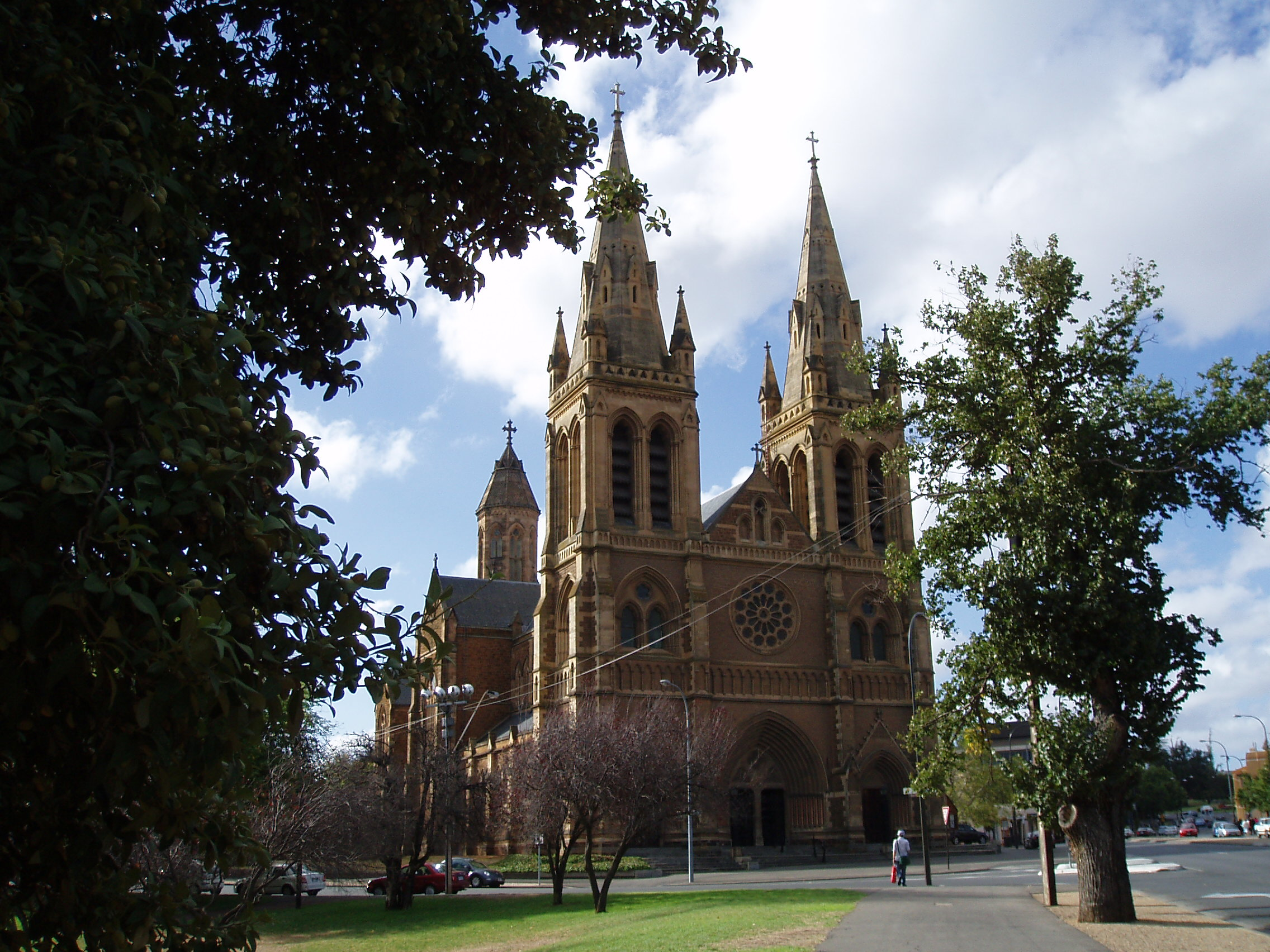
- St Peter's Cathedral
- 34°54′46″S 138°35′53″E
- Location: North Adelaide, South Australia
- Country: Australia
- Denomination: Anglican Church of Australia
- Website: stpeters-cathedral.org.au

History
- Status: Cathedral
- Founded: 29 June 1869
- Founder: Bishop Augustus Short
- Dedication: St Peter the Apostle
- Consecrated: 1 January 1878

Architecture
- Functional status: Active
- Architects: William Butterfield; Edward John Woods
- Architectural type: Church
- Style: Gothic Revival
- Completed: 1904

Specifications
- Length: 62 metres (203 ft)
- Height: 51 metres (168 ft)

Administration
- Province: South Australia
- Diocese: Adelaide

Clergy
- Archbishop: Brad Billings
- Dean: Chris McLeod

South Australian Heritage Register
- Official name: St Peter's Anglican Cathedral
- Type: State heritage (built)
- Designated: 11 September 1986
- Reference no.: 13612

St Peter's Cathedral is an Anglican cathedral in the South Australian capital of Adelaide. It is the seat of the Archbishop of Adelaide and Metropolitan of the Province of South Australia. The cathedral, a significant Adelaide landmark, is situated on approximately 1 acre (0.40 ha) of land at the corner of Pennington Terrace and King William Road in the suburb of North Adelaide.

The south front has features similar to the Cathedral of Notre Dame and the Church of Saint-Jean-Baptiste de Belleville in Paris, including an ornate rose window above the main entrance which depicts stories of South Australia and the Bible.

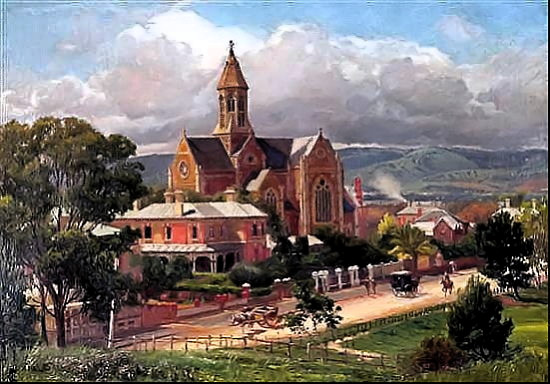
Edmund Gouldsmith. St Peter's Cathedral in 1885.

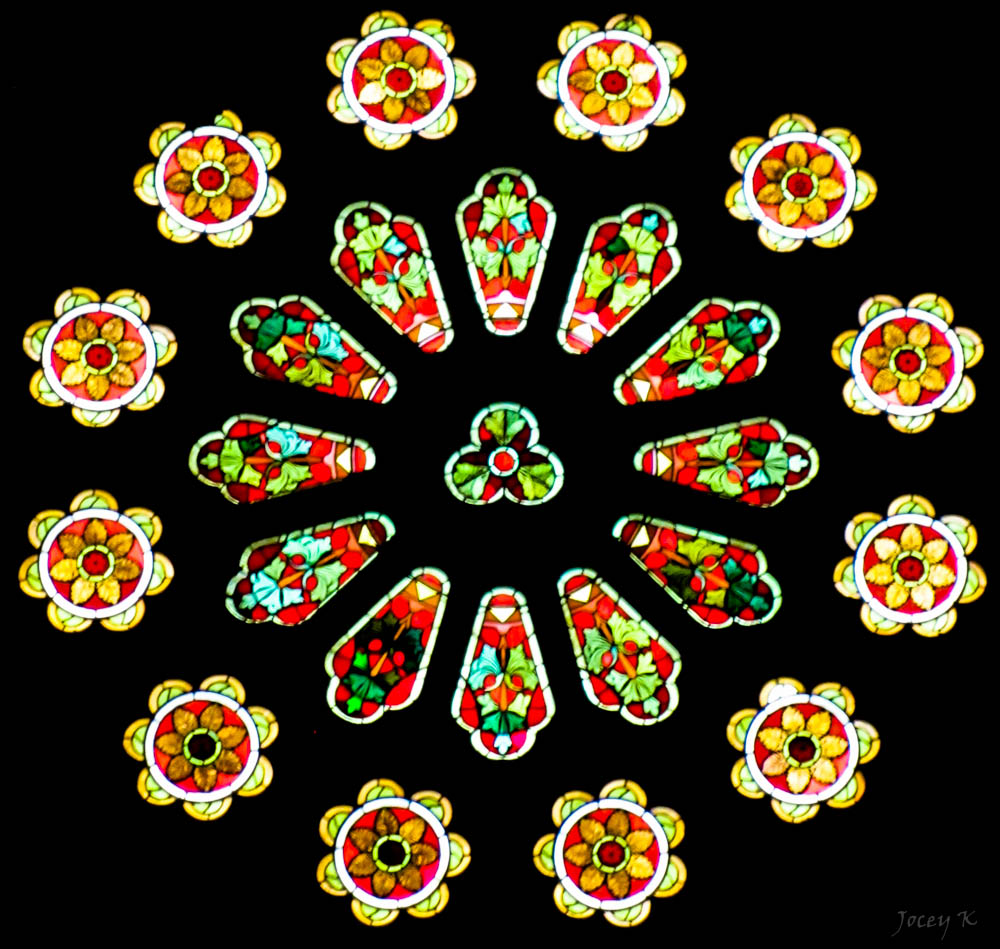
The Rose Window of the cathedral

== Foundation and construction ==
The See of Adelaide was constituted in June 1847. As there was no cathedral, Trinity Church on North Terrace was denoted as the pro tempore cathedral church. Augustus Short, the first Bishop of Adelaide, held the first ordinations there on 29 June 1848 (St Peter's feast day). When Adelaide was surveyed by Colonel William Light over a decade before, land in Victoria Square had been set aside for public use. Bishop Short obtained a land grant in the square from Governor Robe in March 1848; the grant was registered on 23 April 1851. By late 1849 a subscription was bringing in funds for construction of a cathedral on the now cleared site. Around this time the legality of the land grant began to be publicly questioned. It was argued that the area was a public reserve and the governor had no power to issue such grants. To resolve matters Bishop Short, supported by the Synod, took the matter to the Supreme Court. The judgment in June 1855 confirmed that the grant was invalid and construction could not proceed.

Bishop Short purchased just over an acre of land, on Pennington Terrace in North Adelaide, on 8 August 1862. He reported in 1868 that the funds gathered were sufficient and announced to the diocese's synod of his decision to begin construction of a cathedral. Bishop Short had William Butterfield design the cathedral, but the long communication gap between England and Adelaide contributed to delays and disagreement. Butterfield's plans were purchased and given to Edward John Woods, of Adelaide architectural firm Wright, Woods and Hamilton, for completion. Woods changed some of the plans' materials and design, while keeping the general details as Butterfield had proposed. Woods was noted by his colleague Walter Bagot as strongly influenced by French architect Eugène Viollet-le-Duc, and had imbued a French Gothic character in many elements of its design. Bishop Short laid the foundation stone, a 13 long hundredweight (0.7 t) block from Glen Ewin Quarry, on St Peter's Day 1869 in front of over a thousand people. Brown and Thompson contracted for the building work, which progressed slowly. The first service was held on St Peter's Day 1876, though the building was incomplete. Synod meetings and regular services began in May 1877. The women of the diocese had raised £1,200 to purchase an organ which was installed in 1877. The first part of the cathedral was consecrated on 1 January 1878. By the time Bishop Short retired in late 1881, £18,000 received from many donors had been spent. Much of the furnishing was also donated including stained-glass windows, a marble font, the chancel's tessellated pavement and an altar. Work began again in 1890 during the tenure of Bishop George Wyndham Kennion. Governor the Earl of Kintore laid a foundation stone, 1.5 long tons (1.5 t) of Monarto South granite, on 27 September. The ceremony included Masonic Honors as the Governor was Grand Master of the South Australian Freemasons. The congregation raised funds and Woods was again contracted as architect. Over £10,000 was spent beginning the two towers and the western part of the nave, and completing the northern porch. Building work ceased in 1894 when funds were exhausted and did not resume for some years.

A £4,000 bequest came from Sir Thomas Elder in 1897. This and other smaller amounts from offerings and gifts were added to the building fund. A tender was awarded in 1899 to complete the nave and bring the towers to roof height. The Society for Promoting Christian Knowledge donated £1,000, conditional on completion of work by 1902, and in 1900 Robert Barr Smith donated £10,000 to enable completion of the towers, spires and creation of an apse at the chancel end. The Duke and Duchess of York (later King George V and Queen Mary) were present when the nave was consecrated and a Boer War memorial unveiled on 14 July 1901. A dedication ceremony for the towers and spires was held on 7 December 1902, and the last scaffolding removed two months later. The south porch and some temporary vestries were subsequently built, in addition to a crypt under the Lady chapel. A consecration ceremony was held on 7 April 1904; this marked completion of the cathedral's external structure. Records show that the work from the 1890s to date had cost somewhat over £25,000.

== Structure ==
The cathedral's interior is 203 feet (61.9 m) long of which the Lady chapel occupies ? and the nave and chancel the remainder. The nave is 59 feet (18.0 m) wide and, at the top of the spire's crosses, the cathedral rises 168 feet (51.2 m) from ground level. Hammer dressed Tea Tree Gully sandstone—from what is now Anstey Hill Recreation Park— was used in the sanctuary, choir, transepts and part of the nave. Stone used for the quoins is lighter in colour and came from the same area as that used in the Adelaide Town Hall. The building's base and some of the interior uses stone from Glen Osmond in the Adelaide Hills. Other parts of the cathedral use stone from New Zealand, Pyrmont, New South Wales and Murray Bridge.

A reredos—a decorative structure behind the altar—was installed in 1904. It was finished considerably later and dedicated on 6 March 1910 by Bishop Arthur Nutter Thomas. The reredos, containing 23 coloured and gilded panels plus carved figures, is 34 feet (10.4 m) high. This structure was built at St Sidwells Art Works, Tiverton, England to a design by T. H. Lyon. The reredos features Christ in the centre panel, with saints filling the surrounding niches. Four coloured panels below the figure of Christ depict events in the life of St Peter, the patron saint of the cathedral.

The cathedral has significant fine-quality stained glass windows. James Powell and Sons made three that were unveiled in the Lady chapel in November 1900. The southern transept window is the largest stained glass window in the cathedral and was dedicated in August 1926. A window representing Saint Cecilia, patron saint of church music, was unveiled in 1876 in the pulpit side of the chancel. Though by 1929 it was ironically concealed by the organ, since 2018 this window has been lit from the inside, enabling it to be seen, at night time, from the memorial gardens at the cathedral's liturgical north side. Windows elsewhere were funded and influenced by bequests. Amongst these Charles Beaumont Howard's memory is commemorated by a window in the chancel, Sir Anthony Musgrave's daughter Joyce Harriet by one in the sacristy and churchman Richard Bowen Colley by another window in the chancel. The remains of the English biologist and statistician Ronald Fisher are interred within the cathedral.

The stalls for the canons and choir, along with the original bishop's throne (now used as the dean's stall) and pulpit canopy, were a gift to the cathedral from Sir John Langdon Bonython in memory of his wife. Made in Adelaide in 1926, carvings can be seen on the capitals at each end of the stalls and also around the upper work in the canopies above.

In the western tower is the cathedral's ring of eight bells, hung for change ringing. Their purchase was funded by a bequest from cathedral warden Frederick Allen Wakeman. They were cast by John Taylor & Co of Loughborough England in 1946 and were dedicated by Bishop Robin on 29 June 1947. With the tenor (largest) bell weighing just over 41 long hundredweight (2.1 t) they are the heaviest ring of eight bells in the Southern Hemisphere, and the second heaviest ring of eight in the world after Sherborne Abbey in England. The bells are rung by members of The Australian and New Zealand Association of Bellringers who also operate the Adelaide Ringing Centre of 8 dumb-bells for training which opened in 2012.

== Music ==
St Peter's Cathedral has a long and distinguished musical reputation in Adelaide. St Peter's Cathedral Choir has been singing services in the cathedral for over 140 years. It is the only choir of children and adults of its type in Adelaide. Currently, the choir sings two major choral services per week (Solemn Eucharist and Evensong every Sunday), in addition to frequent other services, concert performances and other special occasions. The choir has undertaken five international tours, singing in cathedrals and chapels throughout England end elsewhere. They have toured the UK in 2006/7, 2010/11 (plus Rome); 2014/15 (plus France); 2019/20 and most recently in 2023/24.

=== Directors of music and masters of the choristers ===
Historically, the master of the choristers was also the cathedral organist. In 1994, the role was split, creating the two positions of director of music and organist.

- 2020–present: Anthony Hunt
- 1996–2020: Leonie Hempton OAM
- 1994–1996: Peter Leech
- 1963–1994: Dr John David Swale AM
- 1963–1964: Lyall Von Einem (acting)
- 1955–1962: Jack Vernon Peters
- 1936–1955: The Revd Horace Percy Finnis
- 1891–1936: John Millard Dunn
- 1876–1891: Arthur Boult

=== Organists ===
- 2024–: Andrew Georg
- 2018–2024: David Heah
- 2015–2017: Joshua van Konkelenberg
- 1999–2015: Shirley Gale
- 1994–1999: John David Swale AM

=== Organ ===
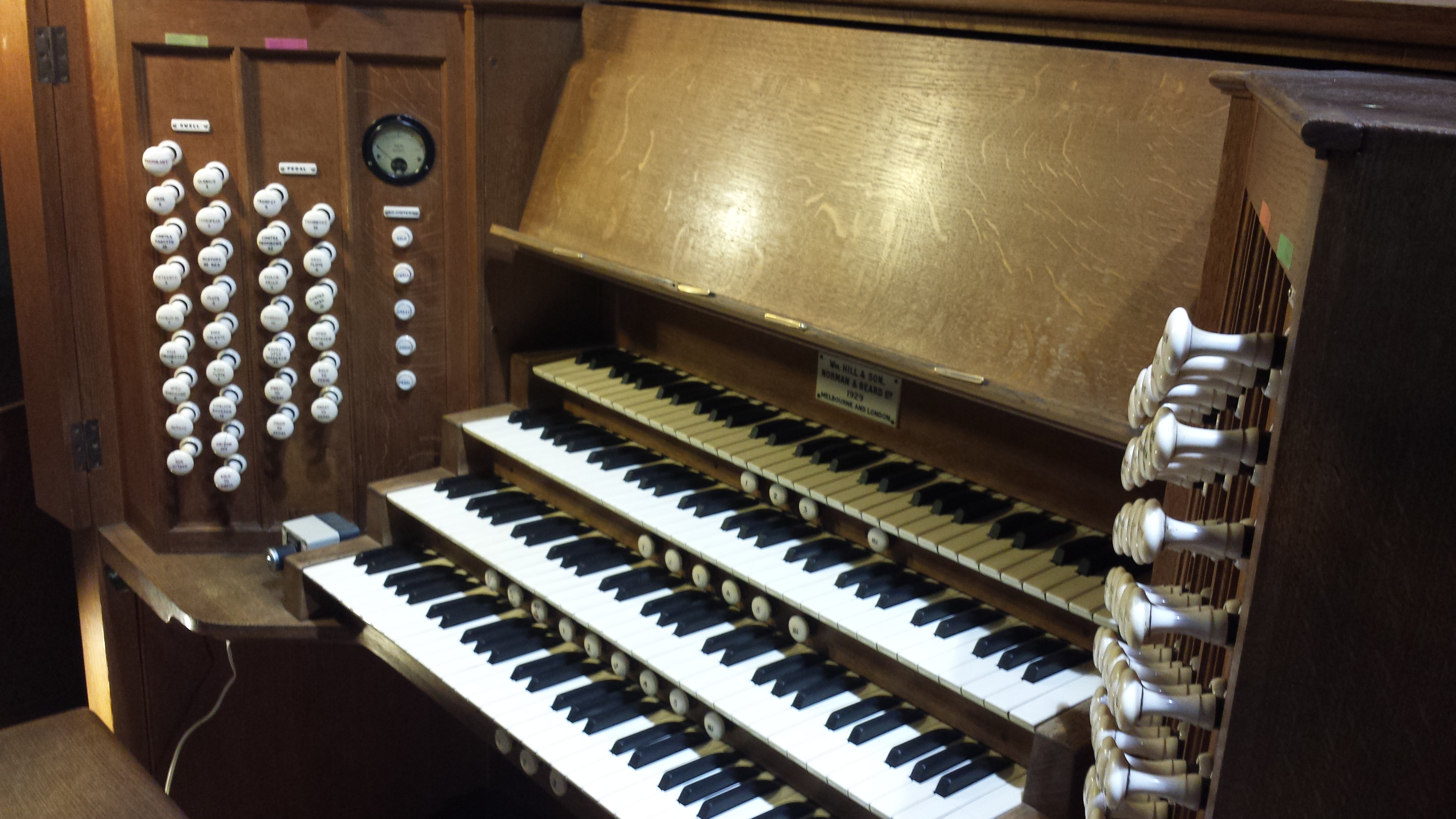
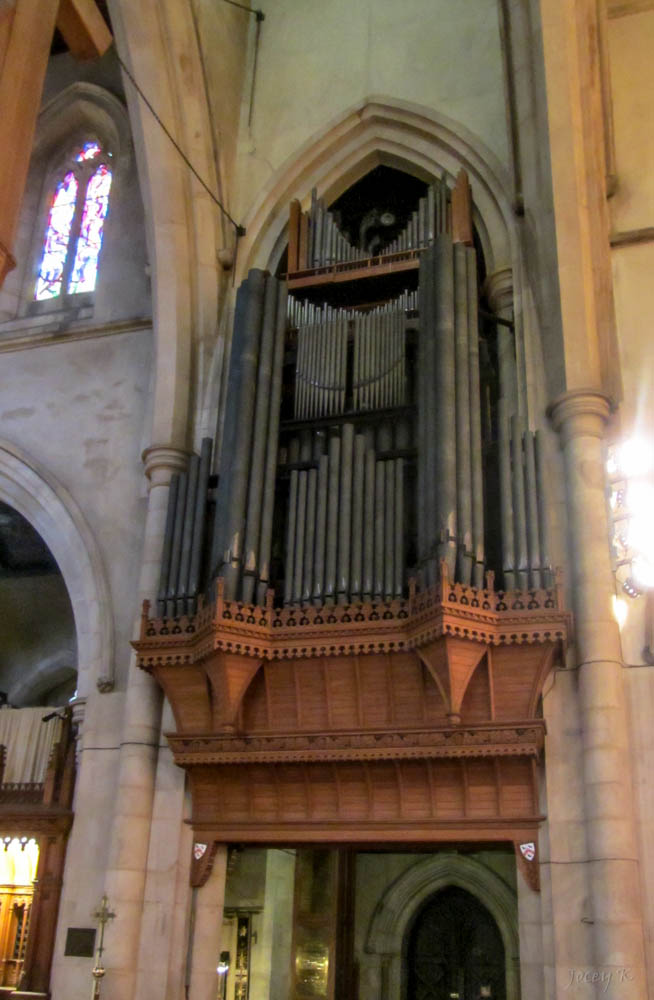
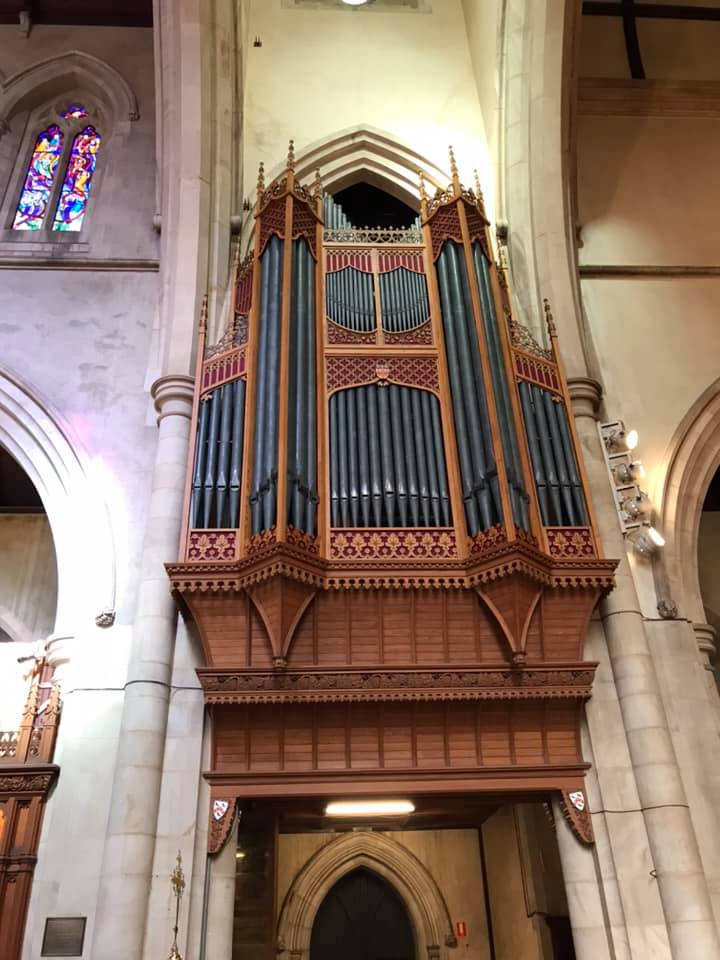
Top: Organ console, 2015
Middle: 1929 organ, front wooden facade only partly completed, 2013
Bottom: The organ after restoration with new wooden frame, 2020

The cathedral's original organ was built by the London firm of Bishop & Son. It was installed in 1877 and dedicated on 1 January 1878. Located in what is now the sacristy, it was used for over fifty years before relocation in 1930 to St Augustine's Church in Unley, South Australia. The current organ was built by William Hill & Son and Norman & Beard of Melbourne and London and was dedicated on 29 July 1929. Until 2017, it remained largely unaltered, featuring electro-pneumatic action, four manuals and fifty speaking stops, featuring 26 couplers. Two additions were made, the addition of a Mixture V stop on the Great (1986) and the 32' Contra Trombone to the pedal division (1989). The lowest 12 pipes of this rank are located on a wall above the sacristy, opposite the main organ case. In 1963, a carved wooden case for the organ, designed by Walter Bagot, was only partly installed. In 2017/18, the instrument underwent major restoration and overhaul by Harrison & Harrison Ltd of Durham, UK. New mixtures were added to both the great and swell divisions, plus the addition of 8' and 4' principal stops in the pedal division. Some tonal irregularities dating from the 1980s were reversed, ensuring the instrument once again speaks and sounds to the original Hill, Norman and Beard specification. The console was also upgraded to include a capture system and modern playing aides, and the casework was completed, drawing inspiration from the original Bagot design. This work was completed at a cost of approx AU$1.5 million and the "First Chords" played on Advent Sunday 2 December 2018.

== Clergy ==
The bishop of Adelaide was formally rector of the cathedral until 1986. The cathedral was governed by the bishop with assistance from a dean (the dean of Adelaide) and chapter. The dean and chapter operated as an independent body, meaning they were not required to report to the synod of the Diocese of Adelaide. In 1986, the administrative functions of the dean and chapter were transferred to a cathedral council. Since 1986, the cathedral has been administrated as a parish with the dean (known as the dean of the cathedral) as rector. The dean of the cathedral is not synonymous with the office of dean of Adelaide (which exists in theory but has been vacant since 1997).

=== Deans ===
- 2021–present: Chris McLeod (Assistant bishop, Anglican Diocese of Adelaide, National Aboriginal bishop, Anglican Church of Australia)
- 2012–2021: Frank Nelson (previously Dean of Wellington, New Zealand)
- 2009–2011: Sarah Macneil (later Bishop of Grafton)
- 2000–2008: Steven Ogden
- 1999–2000: Stuart Smith (acting)
- 1987–1998: David Richardson (later Dean of Melbourne and Anglican Ambassador to the Vatican)

=== Bishop's vicar ===
- 1982–1987: Keith Chittleborough
- 1966–1982: Lionel Edward W. Renfrey (also Assistant Bishop of Adelaide 1969–1985)
- 1964–1966: William Devonshire
- 1963–1964: Patrick Austin Day (became rector of Christ Church St Laurence, Sydney)
- 1957–1963: Arthur Weston
- 1955–1957: Thomas Thornton Reed (became Bishop of Adelaide in 1957)
- 1927–1955: Horace Percy Finnis
- 1890–1927: William Somerville Milne
- 1878–1890: Arthur Dendy

== Gallery ==
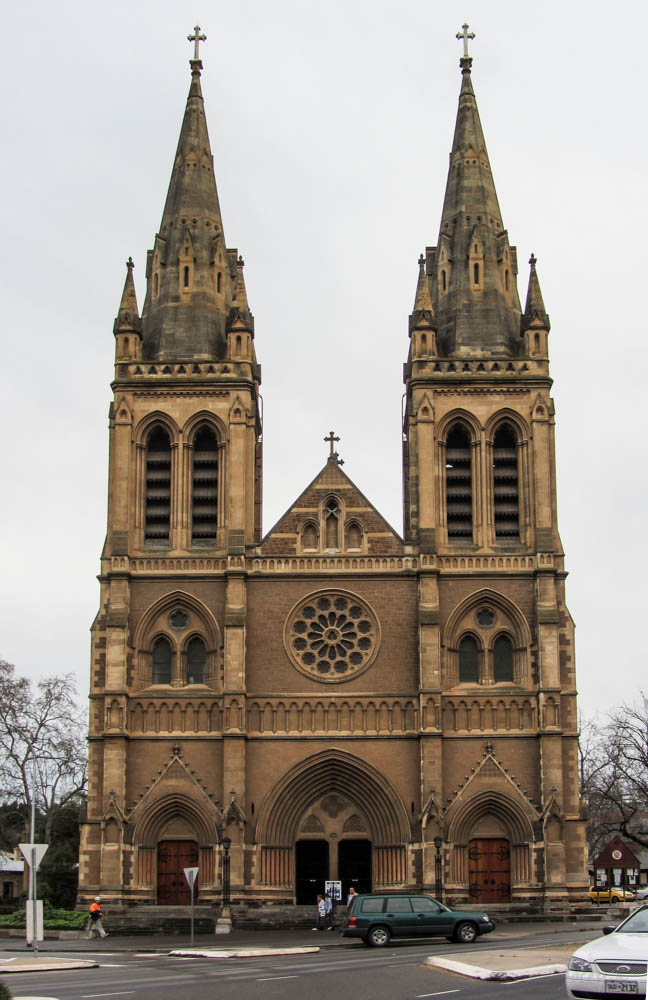
St Peter's Cathedral, south front in 2013

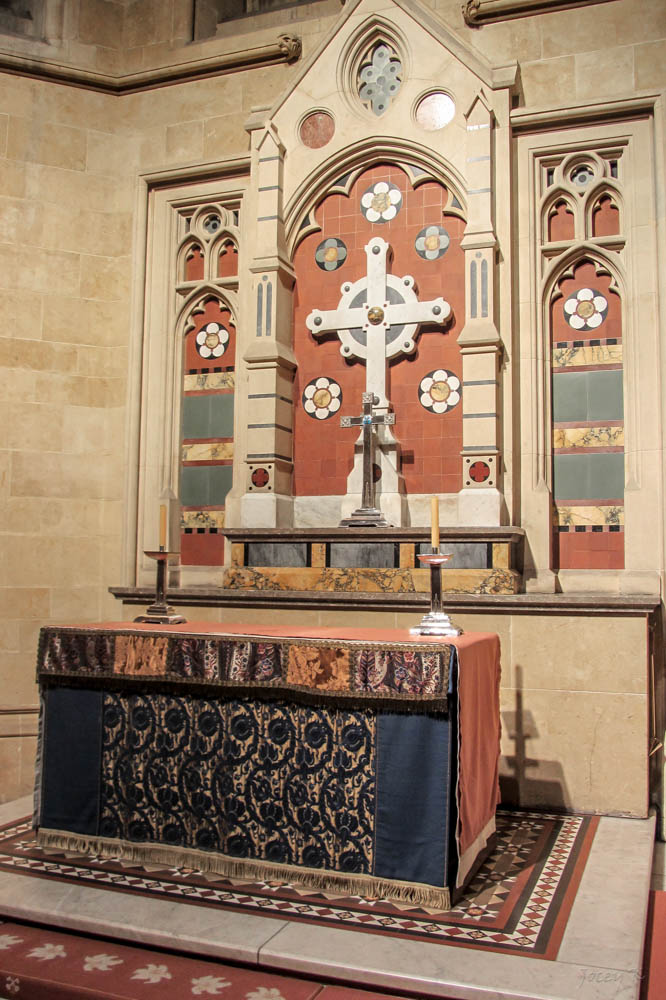
Lady Chapel in 2013

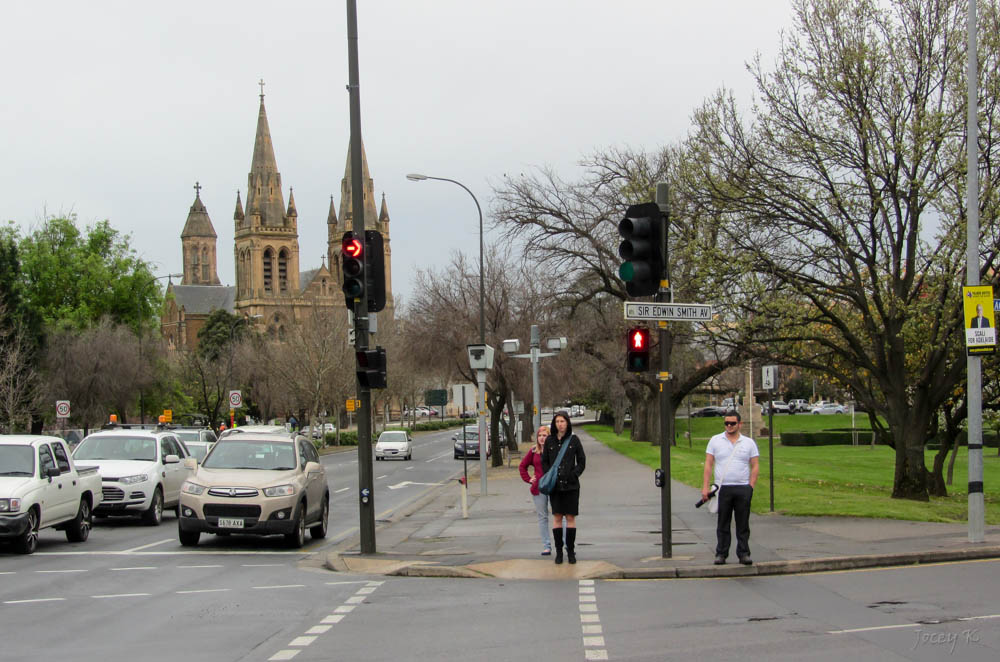
The cathedral from King William Road in 2013

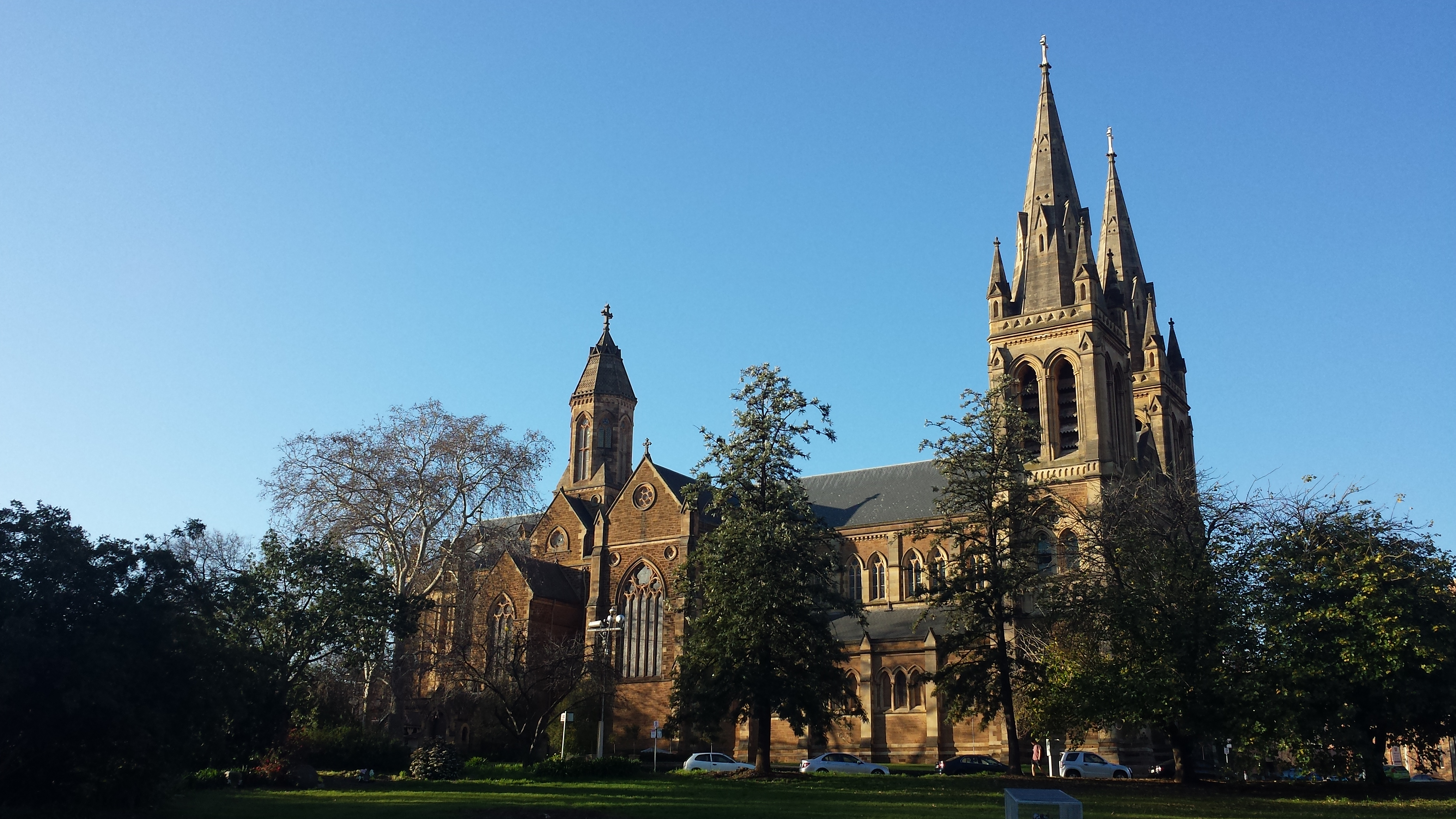
St Peter's Cathedral from the Creswell Gardens, due south

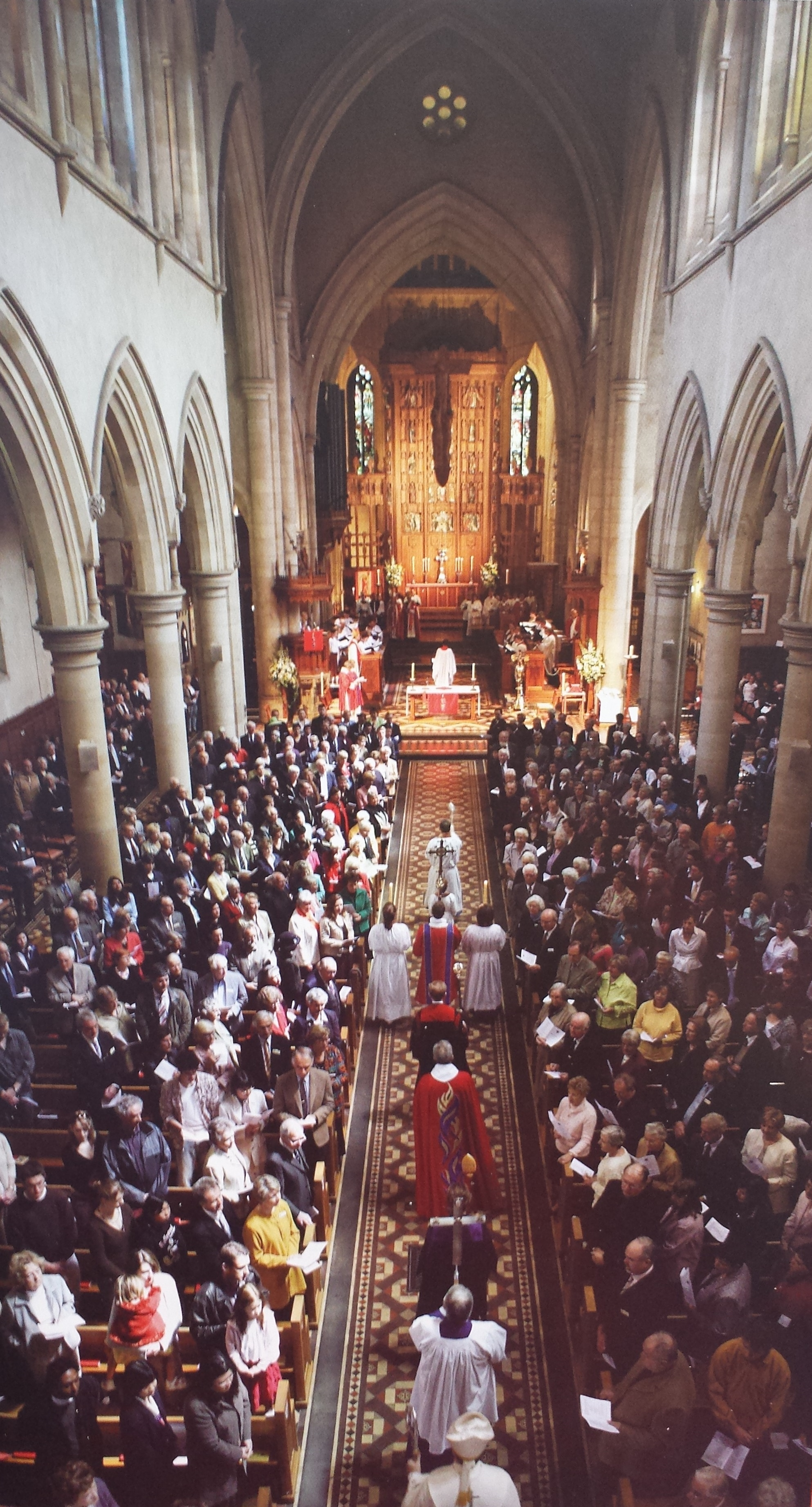
St Peter's Cathedral during a special service in 2009

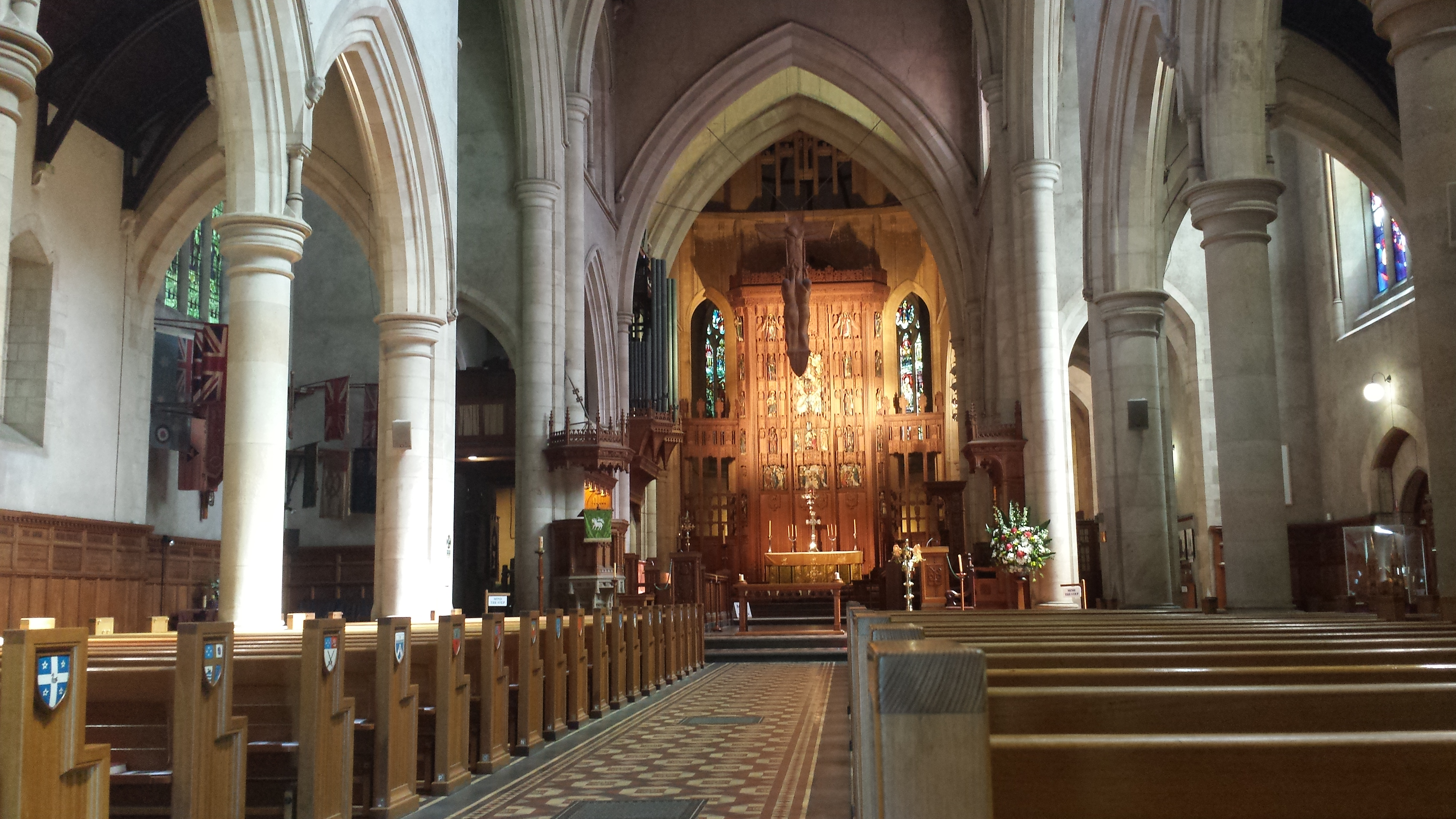
Nave

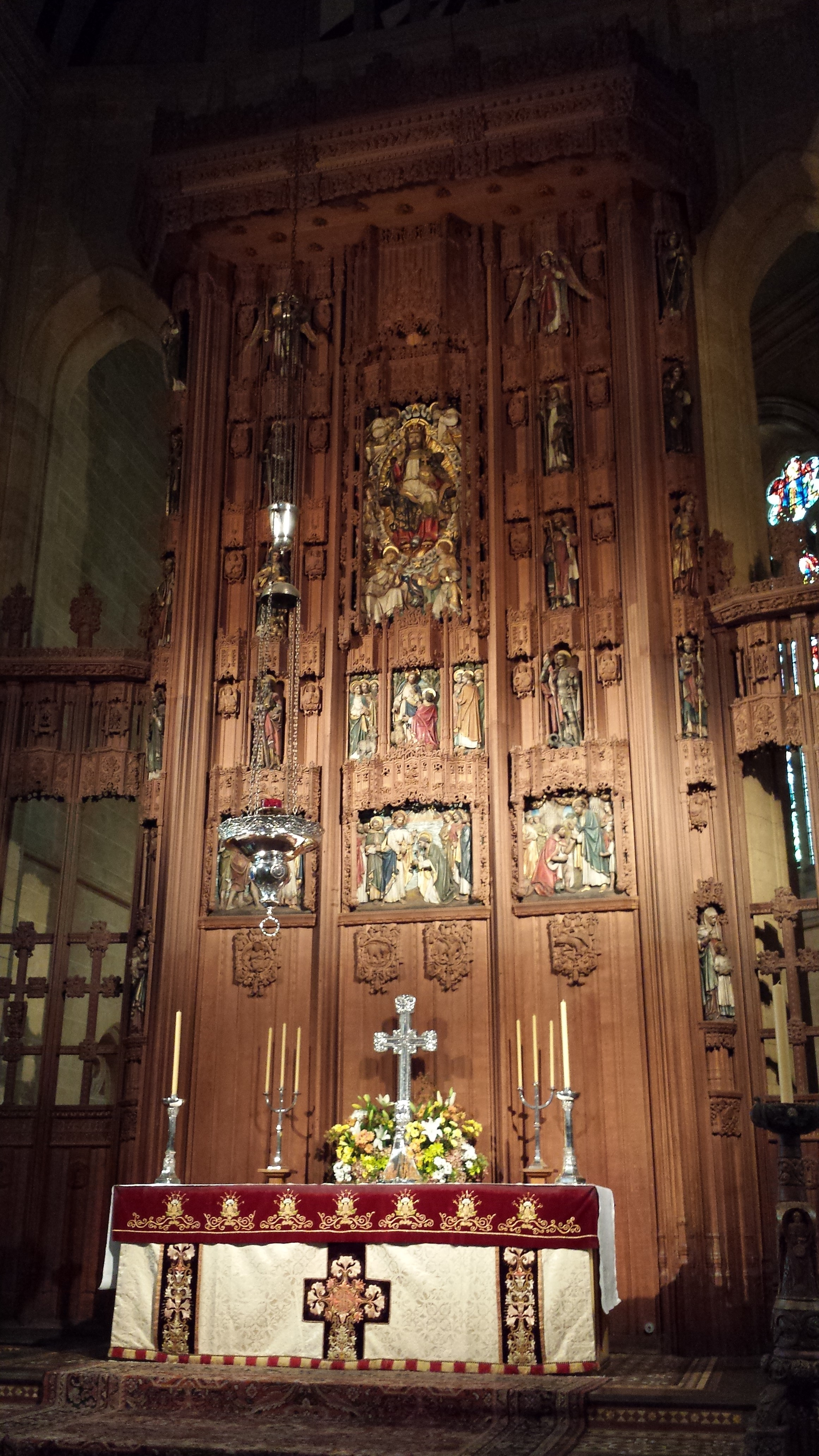
Reredos and high altar

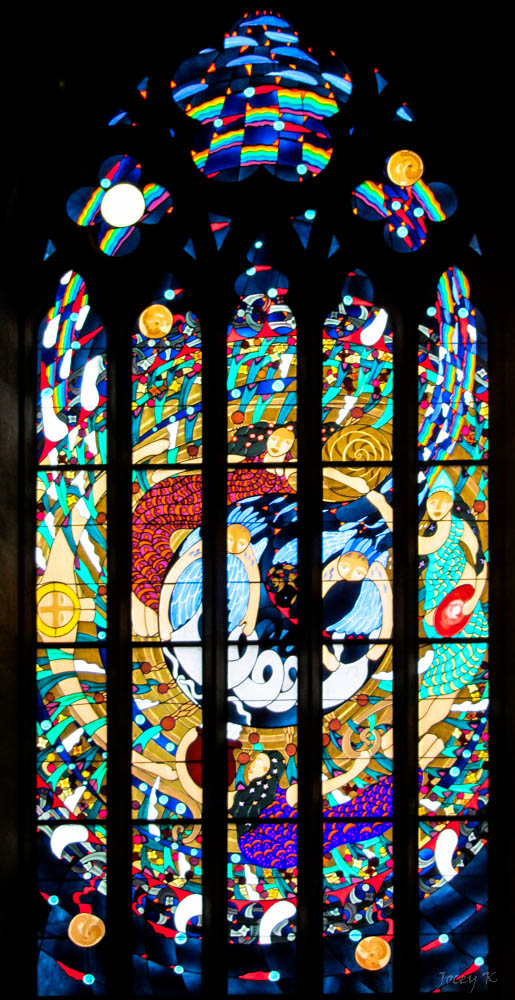
Magdalene window, installed in 2001

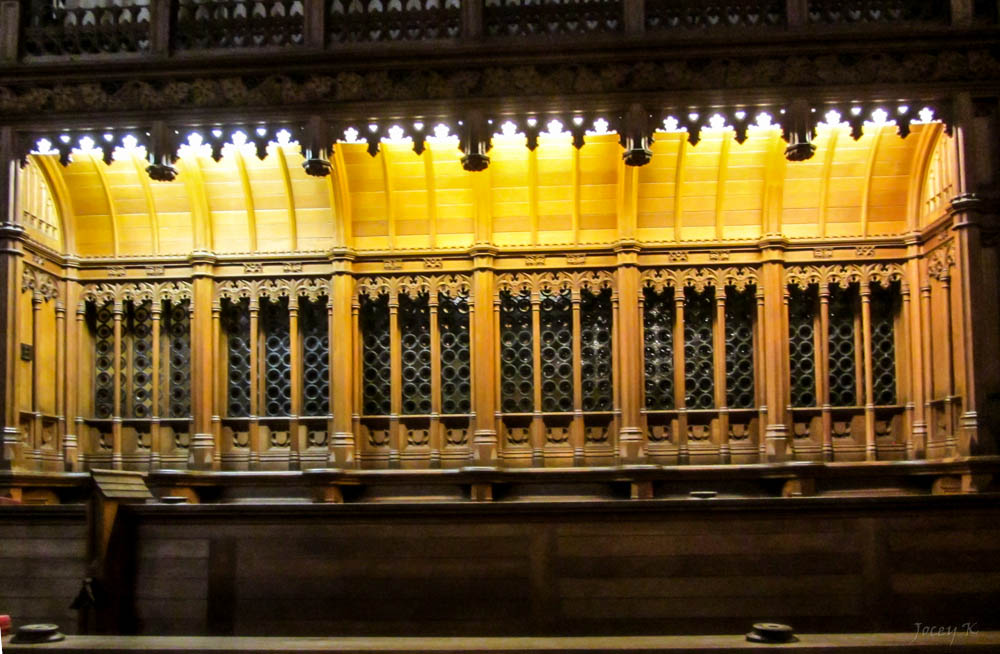
Choir stalls in 2013

== See also ==
- St Peter's Cathedral
- List of cathedrals in Australia
