= Peter Coffin =

Peter Coffin may refer to:

- Peter Coffin (artist) (born 1972), artist based in New York City
- Peter Coffin (bishop), Anglican bishop of Ottawa from 1999 to 2007
