= Bishop of Ottawa =

Bishop of Ottawa may refer to:

- Anglican Diocese of Ottawa
- Roman Catholic Archbishop of Ottawa
