= Steven Ogden =

Steven Ogden is an Anglican priest in Australia. He was the Dean of Adelaide from 2000 to 2008 when he became head of St Francis Theological College in Brisbane.

Religious titles
Preceded by David John Leyburn Richardson	Dean of Adelaide; 2000–2008	Succeeded by Sarah Macneil
