= Diocese of Ottawa =

Diocese of Ottawa may refer to:

- Roman Catholic Archdiocese of Ottawa
- Anglican Diocese of Ottawa
