= Shane Parker (bishop) =

Canadian Anglican bishop (born 1958)

The Most Reverend Shane Parker
- Primate of the Anglican Church of Canada
- Church: Anglican Church of Canada
- In office: 2025–present
- Predecessor: Linda Nicholls
- Previous posts: Bishop of Ottawa (2020–2025); Dean of Ottawa (1999–2020)

Orders
- Ordination: May 14, 1987 (diaconate); December 8, 1987 (priesthood) by Edwin Lackey
- Consecration: May 31, 2020 by Anne Germond

Personal details
- Born: May 22, 1958 (age 68) Edmonton, Alberta
- Denomination: Anglicanism

Shane Alexander Donaldson Parker (born May 22, 1958) is a Canadian Anglican bishop. Since June 2025, he has been the 15th Primate of the Anglican Church of Canada. He was previously the 10th diocesan bishop of the Anglican Diocese of Ottawa in the Anglican Church of Canada (ACC). Prior to his election as bishop, Parker was dean of Ottawa and rector of Christ Church Cathedral.

== Early life and education ==
Parker was born in Edmonton to Irish-Canadian parents and raised in western Canada. He is a lifelong Anglican. Parker did undergraduate and graduate studies at Carleton University and worked as a sociologist prior to studying theology at Saint Paul University. Parker was ordained a priest in the Diocese of Ottawa in 1987.

== Ordained ministry ==
As a priest, Parker served in parish ministry and as an archdeacon prior to his appointment as dean of Ottawa in 1999. As dean, he appointed Albert Dumont, an Algonquin poet who had renounced Christianity for indigenous beliefs, as "indigenous spiritual teacher-in-residence" at Christ Church Cathedral. He also oversaw a $120,000 restoration of the cathedral and the cathedral's membership in Coventry Cathedral's Community of the Cross of Nails.

== Episcopacy ==
On March 14, 2020—the final day before Anglican church services were suspended amid the spreading COVID-19 pandemic—the diocese elected Parker as its 10th bishop. He was consecrated and installed by Archbishop Anne Germond on May 31, 2020, at Christ Church Cathedral.

Parker was elected to a three-year term as primate of the ACC by the church's General Synod on June 26, 2025. Although he was not initially a candidate for the office, he was nominated by the Synod's house of bishops after a motion from the Synod's order of laity requested an additional nominee following the second ballot. Parker's election came on the fifth ballot, when he received majority support from both the laity and clergy orders of the synod. He was installed in the post during a service at St. Paul's Cathedral in London, Ontario, on June 29, 2025.

== Personal life ==
He is married to Katherine Shadbolt and they have three adult children.

== Bibliography ==
- Parker, Shane (2005). Answering the Big Questions. Novalis. ISBN 978-2895074861.

== Notes ==
Anglican Communion titles
Preceded by Peter Coffin	Dean of Ottawa; 1999–2020	Succeeded by Elizabeth J. Bretzlaff
Preceded by John Chapman	Bishop of Ottawa; 2020–2025	Succeeded by Kathryn Otley
Preceded by Linda Nicholls	Primate of the Anglican Church of Canada; 2025–present	Incumbent
