= John Chapman (bishop) =

Canadian Anglican Bishop of Ottawa

John Holland Chapman was the ninth Canadian Anglican Bishop of Ottawa.

A native of Ottawa, Chapman was educated at Carleton University, the University of Western Ontario, and the University of the South and ordained Deacon and Priest in 1978. His first post was as assistant curate at St. Matthias' Church, Ottawa after which he became Anglican Chaplain at the University of Western Ontario. In 1983 he joined the Faculty of Theology at Huron University College, University of Western Ontario. In 1987 he became Rector of St. Jude, London, Ontario; and in 1999 Professor of Pastoral Theology at Huron University College and appointed Dean of Theology in 2000, a position he held until his election to the Ottawa See in September 2007.

Religious titles
Preceded by Peter Robert Coffin	Bishop of Ottawa; 2007 – 2020	Succeeded by Shane Parker
