= Kathryn Otley =

Canadian Anglican bishop

The Right Reverend Kathryn Otley
- Bishop of Ottawa
- Church: Anglican Church of Canada
- Diocese: Ottawa
- In office: 2026–present
- Predecessor: Shane Parker

Orders
- Ordination: June 13, 2006 (diaconate); November 29, 2006 (priesthood)
- Consecration: May 9, 2026 by Anne Germond

Personal details
- Born: Montreal, Quebec, Canada

Kathryn Anne Otley is a Canadian Anglican bishop. Since May 2026, she has been the 11th bishop of Ottawa in the Anglican Church of Canada. Prior to her consecration as bishop, she was incumbent at All Saints' Anglican Church, Westboro, and an archdeacon in the diocese of Ottawa.

== Early life and education ==
Otley was born in Montreal. She was raised in the Anglican Church of Canada. Otley has bachelor's and master's degrees in classics from Carleton University. After her marriage and the birth of her children, she enrolled at Saint Paul University for theological studies.

== Ordained ministry ==
Otley taught Sunday school at Trinity Anglican Church, Bank Street, during her years at Carleton University. Following a divorce and the illness of a child, she gave up a doctoral program and pursued ordained ministry. She was ordained in the Diocese of Ottawa in 2006. She was an assistant curate at St. John the Evangelist Anglican Church, then served as incumbent in Fitzroy Harbour from 2008 to 2013, at Christ Church, Bells Corners, from 2013 to 2023 and at All Saints' Westboro from 2023 to 2026. During her time at Bells Corners, she held a drag queen story hour for more than 200 children and adults at Christ Church after the event had been disrupted by a protester in a different location.

She was archdeacon for the Carleton deanery from 2018 to 2023 and of central Ottawa from 2023 to 2026. She has been a member of the General Synod of the Anglican Church of Canada since 2022. In 2020, she was a candidate for bishop of Ottawa; Shane Parker was elected. Following Parker's election as primate of the Anglican Church of Canada in 2025, Otley was again nominated for diocesan bishop. After her election, she was consecrated and installed at Christ Church Cathedral on May 9, 2026. She was the first woman to be bishop of Ottawa.

== Personal life ==
Otley has three grown children and one grandchild. She is a kayaker and embroiderer.

Anglican Communion titles
Preceded by Shane Parker	Bishop of Ottawa; Since 2025	Incumbent
