= Howard Root =

Anglican religious figure and academic

Howard Eugene Root (13 April 1926 – 19 November 2007) was an American-born British Anglican priest, theologian, and academic. He was Professor of Theology at the University of Southampton from 1966 to 1981, and Director of the Anglican Centre in Rome and Counsellor on Vatican affairs to Archbishop of Canterbury from 1981 to 1991.

Root was educated at the University of Southern California (BA, 1945), St Catherine's Society, Oxford (BA, 1951), Magdalene College, Cambridge (MA, 1953), and Magdalen College, Oxford (MA, 1970). He trained for ordination at Ripon Hall, Oxford, and was ordained deacon in 1953 and priest in 1954. He taught at Cambridge from 1953 to 1966, and was a Fellow of Emmanuel College, Cambridge from 1954 to 1966 and Dean of Emmanuel from 1956 to 1966. He was a delegated observer to the Second Vatican Council.

== Bibliography ==
- Root, Howard E. (2018). Christopher R. Brewer (ed.). Theological Radicalism and Tradition: 'The Limits of Radicalism' with appendices. London: Routledge.
