= David Thomson (bishop) =

Retired British Anglican Bishop

The Right Reverend David Thomson FSA FRHistS FRSA
- Bishop of Huntingdon
- Church: Church of England
- Diocese: Diocese of Ely
- In office: 2008 – 2018
- Predecessor: John Inge
- Successor: Dagmar Winter
- Other post: Acting Bishop of St Edmundsbury and Ipswich (2013–2015)

Orders
- Ordination: 1981 (deacon); 1982 (priest) by David Lunn
- Consecration: 3 July 2008 by Rowan Williams

Personal details
- Born: 2 February 1952 (age 74) Sunderland, County Durham, United Kingdom
- Denomination: Anglican
- Parents: Ronald (a priest)
- Spouse: Jean (m. 1974)
- Children: 4
- Profession: bishop, medieval historian; prev. lecturer
- Education: Keble College, Oxford

David Thomson (born 2 February 1952) is a British retired Church of England bishop. From 2008 to 2013, he was the Bishop of Huntingdon, sole suffragan bishop of the Diocese of Ely.

== Early life ==
Thomson was born in Sunderland, County Durham, where his father, Ronald, was assistant curate; the family moved to the Sheffield area two years later (Ronald was curate of Attercliffe until 1957, and then Vicar of Shiregreen; he has since become an honorary canon of Sheffield). David was educated at King Edward VII School, Sheffield, followed by Keble College, Oxford, where he was awarded his Oxford Master of Arts (MA Oxon) and Doctor of Philosophy (DPhil) degrees in 1978. He trained for the ministry at Westcott House (1978–1981) and Selwyn College, Cambridge, where he studied theology (Selwyn awarded his Bachelor of Arts {BA} in 1980 and his Cambridge MA in 1984).

== Ordained ministry ==
Thomson was made a deacon at Petertide 1981 (28 June) and ordained a priest the Petertide following (27 June 1982) – both times by David Lunn, Bishop of Sheffield, at Sheffield Cathedral. He served as assistant curate in the Maltby, South Yorkshire team ministry (1981–1984), and then Team Vicar of St Mary's Church, Banbury (1984–1994), Team Rector of Cockermouth (1994–2002) and finally, before being ordained to the episcopate, the Archdeacon of Carlisle and a canon residentiary of Carlisle Cathedral (2002–2008).

=== Episcopal ministry ===
Thomson was consecrated as a bishop by Rowan Williams, Archbishop of Canterbury, in Southwark Cathedral on 3 July 2008 and installed as Bishop of Huntingdon in Ely Cathedral on 17 October that year. During a lengthy vacancy in neighbouring Suffolk's diocesan see (while that diocese had no suffragan) from 20 October 2013 to 7 May 2015, he was also the Acting Bishop of St Edmundsbury and Ipswich. He retired on 30 September 2018.

== Academic career ==
A medieval historian, Thomson is a fellow of the Society of Antiquaries of London and the Royal Historical Society as well as an FRSA. His academic works include A Descriptive Catalogue of Middle English Grammatical Texts (1979) and An Edition of the Middle English Grammatical Texts (1984). His most recent work was on the Bewcastle Cross. He has also published a series of devotional books, A Journey with John, Lent with Luke, Christmas by Candelight and Ways to Pray.

== Personal life ==
Thomson has been married to Jean since 1974, with four children; his interests include detective fiction, crosswords, gardening, photography and fine art.

== Styles ==
- Doctor David Thomson (1978–1981)
- The Reverend Doctor David Thomson (1981–2002)
- The Venerable Doctor David Thomson (2002–2008)
- The Right Reverend Doctor David Thomson (2008–present)

Church of England titles
Preceded by John Inge	Bishop of Huntingdon; 2008–2018	Succeeded by Dagmar Winter
