= William Robinson (bishop) =

Canadian Anglican bishop

William James Robinson was a Canadian Anglican bishop in the second half of the 20th century.

Robinson was born on 8 September 1916, in Kemptville, Ontario, educated at Bishop's University, Lennoxville, and ordained in 1940. After a curacy in Trenton, he was Rector of Madoc. Further incumbencies in Napanee, Belleville, Ottawa; Canon/Incumbent in Hamilton (Hamilton/Niagara Diocese), appointed to Guelph, as Archdeacon of Trafalgar (comprising the area surrounding Oakville, Burlington, and Halton in the Diocese of Niagara) in 1968. He was a member of the joint hymnal committee of the Anglican and United churches, which ultimately released together in 1971 The Hymn Book of the Anglican Church of Canada and the United Church of Canada, also known as "the red book."

The Canadian primate, Archbishop Michael Peers, said of Bishop Robinson, "I remember Bill as a priest in Ottawa diocese and as a member of the house of bishops. In both roles, he was an articulate and gentle pastor." Bishop Robinson was a strong advocate of the ordination of women into the Anglican priesthood.

In 1970 he became the Bishop of Ottawa, retiring in 1981. He resided in Kingston, Ontario at the time of his death on 9 July 2002.

Anglican Communion titles
Preceded by Ernest Samuel Reed	Bishop of Ottawa; 1970 –1981	Succeeded by Edwin Keith Lackey
