= Gordon Roe =

British Anglican bishop (1932–1999)

William Gordon Roe (5 January 1932 – 19 July 1999) was a British Anglican bishop who served as Bishop of Huntingdon (the suffragan bishop in the Diocese of Ely) from 1980 until 1997.

Roe was educated at Bournemouth School, Jesus College, Oxford and St Stephen's House. He was made deacon on Trinity Sunday 1958 (1 June) and ordained priest the Trinity Sunday following (24 May 1959) — both times by Alwyn Williams, Bishop of Winchester, at Winchester Cathedral. After a curacy at Bournemouth he was Priest in charge of St Michael's, Abingdon and then Vice Principal of St Chad's College, Durham. Following this he was Vicar of St Oswald's Durham from 1974 to 1980 and Rural Dean of Durham until his appointment to the episcopate. He was consecrated a bishop on 3 November 1980, by Robert Runcie, Archbishop of Canterbury, at Westminster Abbey.

Church of England titles
Preceded by Eric Wall	Bishop of Huntingdon; 1980–1997	Succeeded by John Flack
