= John Inge =

British Anglican bishop (born 1955)

The Right Reverend John Inge KCVO
- Bishop of Worcester
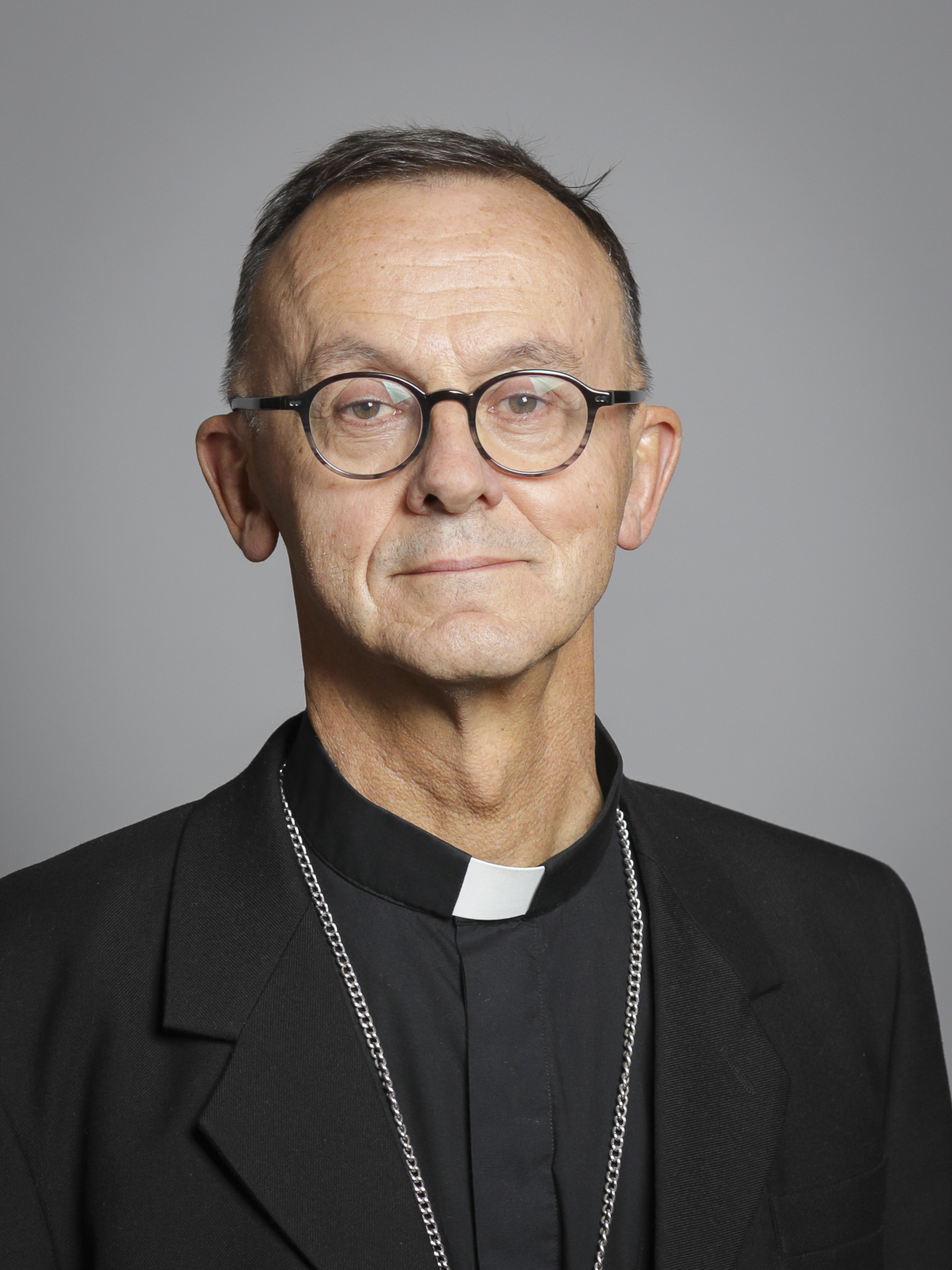
- Inge in 2019
- Church: Church of England
- Diocese: Worcester
- In office: 2007 to 2024
- Predecessor: Peter Selby
- Successor: Hugh Nelson
- Other post: Lord High Almoner (2013–2024)
- Previous post: Bishop of Huntingdon (2003–2008)

Orders
- Ordination: 1984 (deacon); 1985 (priest) by Eric Kemp
- Consecration: 9 October 2003

Personal details
- Born: 26 February 1955 (age 71)
- Denomination: Anglican
- Residence: The Old Palace, Worcester
- Spouse: Denise (died 2014); Helen (m. 2018)
- Profession: Teacher
- Education: St Chad's College, Durham; Keble College, Oxford; College of the Resurrection, Mirfield

Member of the House of Lords
- Lord Spiritual
- Bishop of Worcester; 25 June 2012 – 9 October 2024

John Geoffrey Inge KCVO (/ɪndʒ/ INJ; born 26 February 1955) is a retired British Anglican bishop. From 2007 to 2024, he was Bishop of Worcester, the diocesan bishop of the Church of England's Diocese of Worcester. He was previously Bishop of Huntingdon, a suffragan bishop in the Diocese of Ely, from 2003 to 2007. Inge served as Lord High Almoner, a ceremonial position in the Royal Household, from 2013 to 2024.

== Early life and education ==
John Inge was born to Geoffrey Alfred and Elsie Inge (née Hill) on 26 February 1955,. He was educated at Kent College in Canterbury, at that time an all-boys direct grant grammar school, now a private school in Kent. He went on to study chemistry at St Chad's College, Durham University, graduating with a Bachelor of Science (BSc) degree in 1977. That same year Inge performed with Arthur Bostrom at the Edinburgh Festival as part of Durham University Sensible Thespians (DUST), which would be renamed the Durham Revue in 1988. In 1979, he undertook teacher training at Keble College, Oxford and received a Postgraduate Certificate in Education (PGCE).

Having studied chemistry at university and completed teacher training, Inge began his first career as a secondary school teacher. He taught chemistry at Lancing College, a mixed-gender independent boarding and day school in West Sussex. He also served as a tutor of Teme House, one of the school's boarding houses.

He trained for ordination at the College of the Resurrection, Mirfield. During his ministry, he returned to Durham University for postgraduate study. He completed a Master of Arts (MA) degree in systematic theology in 1994 and a Doctor of Philosophy (PhD) degree in 2002. His doctoral thesis was titled "A Christian theology of place", which was revised and published under the same name in 2003 via Ashgate Publishing.

== Ordained ministry ==
Inge was ordained in the Church of England as a deacon at Petertide 1984 (30 June), by Eric Kemp, Bishop of Chichester, in Chichester Cathedral and as a priest in Lancing College Chapel on 7 July the next year. From 1984 to 1986, he was the assistant chaplain at Lancing College. He then moved to Harrow School, an all-boys independent boarding in London, where he was junior chaplain from 1987 to 1989 and senior chaplain from 1989 to 1990, while also continuing to teach.

After leaving Harrow, Inge moved into parish ministry. From 1990 to 1996, he was the vicar of St Luke's Church, Wallsend in the Diocese of Newcastle, where he also chaired the Board for Mission and Social Responsibility. He became a canon residentiary of Ely Cathedral in 1996 with particular responsibility for education and mission. He served as vice-dean of the cathedral from 1999 to 2003.

=== Episcopal ministry ===
Inge was consecrated a bishop on 9 October 2003 by Rowan Williams, Archbishop of Canterbury, at Westminster Abbey, to serve as Bishop of Huntingdon (suffragan bishop in the Diocese of Ely). As the warden for readers in the Ely diocese, he encouraged and equipped lay ministry; he chaired the Cambridgeshire Ecumenical Council and co-chaired the East of England Faiths Council.

In July 2007, Inge was nominated to become the Bishop of Worcester, and his election was confirmed on 20 November 2007. He was enthroned at Worcester Cathedral as the 113th Bishop of Worcester on 1 March 2008.

Following a farewell service in Worcester Cathedral on 29 September, he retired as Bishop of Worcester on 9 October 2024.

=== Other work ===
Inge served as chair of the board of the College of Evangelists from 2010 to 2018. He served as a member of the Faith and Order Commission (FAOC) from 2011 to 2016 and on the council of Ridley Hall, Cambridge from 2004 to 2010. He was for some years a trustee of Common Purpose UK, an international, not-for-profit organisation which organises leadership courses across the UK and abroad for the public, private and voluntary sectors, and for which he is now a trust protector. He chairs the council for the Archbishop of Canterbury's Examination (Lambeth Degree) in Theology, which awards the Lambeth degrees – MA, MPhil and PhD degrees in theology. He is also an adviser for the independent public policy think tank ResPublica. He served as Visitor to the Community of the Holy Name from 2007 to 2020, and Visitor to Mucknell Abbey from 2009 to 2020. He was lead bishop on cathedrals and church buildings from 2014 to 2019.

Inge has led numerous groups to Africa, India, South America, Russia and the Holy Land. While vice-dean of Ely Cathedral he established a link between Ely and the Anglican cathedral of Christ Church, Zanzibar and is active in Worcester diocesan links with the Morogoro diocese in the Anglican Church of Tanzania and the Anglican diocese of Peru. He is a longstanding supporter of the World Development Movement, which campaigns for justice and development in the Global South.

Inge was introduced in the House of Lords on 25 June 2012 and made his maiden speech three days later. He joined his first cousin in the Upper House, Field Marshal The Lord Inge, a former Chief of the Defence Staff. On 15 February 2013, it was announced that he had been appointed to the office of Lord High Almoner, a post in the Royal Household. He took part in the Royal Procession at the 2023 Coronation.

=== Views ===
In November 2022, he published a letter alongside his suffragan bishop, Martin Gorick, that stated "the time has come for the Church to celebrate and honour same sex relations" and supported the introduction of same-sex marriage in the Church of England. He later published a detailed letter explaining his view.

In November 2023, he was one of 44 Church of England bishops who signed an open letter supporting the use of the Prayers of Love and Faith (i.e. blessings for same-sex couples) and called for "Guidance being issued without delay that includes the removal of all restrictions on clergy entering same-sex civil marriages, and on bishops ordaining and licensing such clergy".

== Personal life ==
Inge was married to Denise; she died from cancer on 20 April 2014, at the age of 51. Together, they had two children. He remarried in January 2018 to H-J Colston, a China expert, who runs an educational charity, "Engage with China". Through his second marriage, he has two step-children.

He is a vice-president of the National Churches Trust.

== Honours ==
Inge was awarded an honorary DLitt degree from the University of Worcester in 2011. In 2024, he was awarded the Lanfranc Award for Education and Scholarship by the Archbishop of Canterbury.

On 13 November 2024, on his retirement as Lord High Almoner, the King invested Inge with the insignia of a Knight Commander of the Royal Victorian Order (KCVO).

== Publications ==
As well as numerous articles, he is the author of A Christian Theology of Place (2003), which was shortlisted for the Michael Ramsey Prize for Theological Writing, and Living Love: in Conversation with the No 1. Ladies' Detective Agency (2007).

Court offices
Preceded by Nigel McCulloch	Lord High Almoner; 2013–2024	Succeeded by Graham Usher
Church of England titles
Preceded by John Flack	Bishop of Huntingdon; 2003–2007	Succeeded by David Thomson
Preceded by Peter Selby	Bishop of Worcester; 2007–2024	Vacant
