= Peter Coffin (bishop) =

20th and 21st-century Bishop of Ottawa

The Right Reverend Peter Coffin
- Bishop of Ottawa
- Church: Anglican Church of Canada
- Diocese: Anglican Diocese of Ottawa
- In office: 1999–2007
- Predecessor: John Baycroft
- Successor: John Chapman
- Other posts: Bishop Ordinary to the Canadian Forces (2004–2016)

Orders
- Ordination: 1971
- Consecration: 1999
- Education: University of Kings College, Halifax; Trinity College, Toronto; Norman Paterson School of International Affairs, Carleton University, Ottawa

Peter Robert Coffin was the eighth Anglican Bishop of Ottawa, from 1999 to 2007. He also served as the Anglican Bishop Ordinary to the Canadian Forces from 2004 to 2016.

== Education ==
Coffin holds a Bachelor of Arts in sociology from the University of King's College, a Bachelor of Sacred Theology from Trinity College, and a Master of Arts in international affairs and development from the Norman Paterson School of International Affairs. He also received an honorary Doctor of Divinity from the University of King's College in 1997 and from Trinity College in 2004.

== Ministry ==
Coffin was ordained a priest in 1971. After serving as assistant curate at St. Matthew's Anglican Church in Ottawa, he moved to Malaysia to teach Biblical theology at the House of the Epiphany, the theological seminary of the Diocese of Kuching in Sarawak. When he returned to Canada, he was appointed to various parishes in West Quebec and in the Ottawa area and served as the Archdeacon of West Quebec and of Carleton until 1990, when he became the rector of Christ Church Cathedral and the Dean of Ottawa. In 1999 he was ordained a bishop and became the eighth bishop of Ottawa on September 1, 1999, a role in which he continued until 2007. In 2004 he was appointed as Bishop Ordinary to the Canadian Forces; and chaired the Interfaith Committee on Canadian Military Chaplaincy. He was succeeded as Bishop Ordinary by Nigel Shaw on May 28, 2016.

== Appointment of the Rev. Linda Privitera ==
In 2006, Coffin allowed the Rev. Linda Privitera, an American priest in a same-sex marriage, to work as a priest in Ottawa. This caused some controversy within the diocese of Ottawa due to the ongoing debate in the Anglican Church regarding same-sex marriage. A group of seven priests wrote an open letter condemning this decision, saying it was a "breach of the General Synod process in place in this country and puts our relationship with the world-wide Anglican Communion in jeopardy." Coffin afterward commented: "I may be called a liberal and unorthodox. But I firmly believe that people need to be treated with respect and dignity and that loving someone faithfully and in total commitment until death do them part is a blessing, regardless of sexual orientation."

Anglican Communion titles
| Preceded by John Baycroft | Dean of Ottawa; 1990–1999 | Succeeded by Shane Parker |
| Preceded by John Baycroft | Bishop of Ottawa; 1999–2007 | Succeeded by John Chapman |
| Preceded by A.S. Hutchison | Bishop Ordinary to the Canadian Forces; 2004–2016 | Succeeded by Nigel Shaw |
