= Richard Garrard =

The Rt Revd Richard Garrard BD AKC
- Director, Anglican Centre in Rome & Archbishop's Representative to the Holy See
- Church: Church of England
- In office: 2001–2003
- Predecessor: John Baycroft
- Successor: John Flack
- Other posts: Honorary assistant bishop in Norwich (2003–present); in the Diocese in Europe and in the Convocation of Episcopal Churches in Europe (2001–present); Bishop of Penrith (1994–2001); Archdeacon of Sudbury (1991–1994)

Orders
- Ordination: 1961 (deacon); 1962 (priest)
- Consecration: 21 September 1994

Personal details
- Born: 24 May 1937 (age 89)
- Denomination: Anglican
- Parents: Charles & Marjorie Pow
- Spouse: Elizabeth Garrard (née Sewell) (m. 1961)
- Children: James Garrard; Charlotte Garrard
- Profession: Author
- Education: King's College London

Richard Garrard (born 24 May 1937) was the seventh Church of England Suffragan Bishop of Penrith in the modern era.

Garrard was educated at Northampton Grammar School and King's College London. Ordained in 1962, he began his career with a curacy in Woolwich and was then successively a chaplain at Keswick Hall College of Education, principal of the Church Army Training College, canon chancellor at Southwark Cathedral, educational advisor to the Diocese of St Edmundsbury and Ipswich and finally (before his elevation to the episcopate) Archdeacon of Sudbury. From 2001 to 2003 he was the Archbishop of Canterbury's representative to the Holy See and director of the Anglican Centre in Rome. A renowned author, in retirement he continues to minister as an assistant bishop within the Diocese of Norwich.

== Bibliography ==
- Lent with St. Mark ISBN 9780862092979
- Love on the Cross ISBN 9780862097394
- A Time to Pray (Kevin Mayhew, 1995) ISBN 9780862093983

Church of England titles
Preceded by George Hacker	Bishop of Penrith; 1994–2001	Succeeded by James Newcome
Preceded by John Baycroft	Director of the Anglican Centre in Rome and Representative of the Archbishop of Canterbury to the Holy See; 2001–2003	Succeeded by John Flack
