= John Flack (bishop) =

English Anglican bishop

The Right Reverend John Flack
- Director, Anglican Centre in Rome & Archbishop's Representative to the Holy See
- Church: Church of England
- In office: 2003–2008 (retired)
- Predecessor: Richard Garrard
- Successor: David Richardson
- Other posts: Priest-in-charge, Nassington with Yarwell and Woodnewton with Apethorpe (2008–2012); Bishop of Huntingdon (1997–2003); Archdeacon of Pontefract (1992–1997)

Orders
- Ordination: 1966 (deacon); 1967 (priest)
- Consecration: 8 January 1997

Personal details
- Born: John Robert Flack; 30 May 1942 (age 84)
- Denomination: Anglican
- Parents: Edwin & Joan
- Spouse: Julia Slaughter (m. 1968; died 2021)
- Children: Alison & Robert
- Education: University of Leeds

John Robert Flack (born 30 May 1942) is a retired English Anglican bishop and former Director of the Anglican Centre in Rome.

Flack was educated at Leeds University and the College of the Resurrection at Mirfield. He was ordained deacon in 1966 and priest in 1967. After curacies at Armley and Northampton he was Vicar of St James Chapelthorpe from 1972 to 1981. After this he was successively Team Rector of Brighouse, Rural Dean of Elland and Archdeacon of Pontefract before his ordination to the episcopate. He was consecrated a bishop on 8 January 1997 at Southwark Cathedral, and served as Bishop of Huntington (suffragan bishop in the Diocese of Ely) until 2003. He was subsequently Director of the Anglican Centre in Rome until 2008. On his return to the UK, he was Priest-in-charge of Apethorpe, Nassington, Thornhaugh, Wansford, Woodnewton and Yarwell, in Northamptonshire and Cambridgeshire, until retiring in 2012. During this time, he also served as an Honorary Assistant Bishop in the Dioceses of Peterborough and Ely, from which he retired in 2017.

Church of England titles
Preceded by Gordon Roe	Bishop of Huntingdon; 1997–2003	Succeeded by John Inge
Preceded by Richard Garrard	Director of the Anglican Centre in Rome and Representative of the Archbishop of Canterbury to the Holy See; 2003–2008	Succeeded by David Richardson
