= Charles Roper =

Canadian Anglican bishop

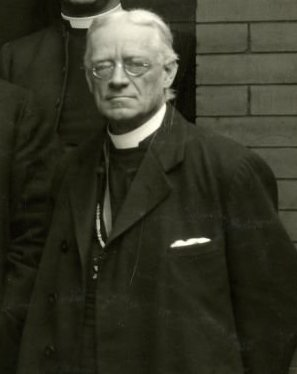
The Right Reverend Charles Roper in c.1924

John Charles Roper (1858 – 26 January 1940) was an Anglican bishop in the Anglo-Catholic tradition in the first half of the 20th century.

== Biography ==
Roper was educated at Keble College, Oxford.

Ordained in 1882, he began his ministry with a curacy at Herstmonceux and was then as chaplain of Brasenose College, Oxford.

In 1886, he was appointed Professor of Divinity at Trinity College, Toronto and also served as parish priest of St Thomas's Toronto. He was then Professor of Theology at the General Theological Seminary, New York City In 1912 he became the third Bishop of British Columbia and was translated to be the Bishop of Ottawa three years later, serving for 24 years - the last six as the Metropolitan of Ontario.

Anglican Communion titles
Preceded by William Perrin	Bishop of British Columbia; 1912–1915	Succeeded by Augustine Scriven
Preceded by Charles Hamilton	Bishop of Ottawa; 1915–1939	Succeeded by Robert Jefferson
Preceded by James Sweeny	Metropolitan of Ontario; 1933–1939	Succeeded by John Anderson
