= Robert Jefferson =

Canadian Anglican bishop

Robert Jefferson (11 July 1881 – 1 January 1968) was a Canadian Anglican bishop in the mid-20th century.

Jefferson was educated at St John's College, Manitoba and ordained in 1908. He began his ordained ministry with curacies in Edmonton and Winnipeg. He held incumbencies in Montague and Ottawa. He was a Canon at Ottawa Cathedral from 1926 to 1939, when he became Bishop of Ottawa. He resigned his See in 1954.

Anglican Communion titles
Preceded by Charles Roper	Bishop of Ottawa; 1939 –1954	Succeeded by Ernest Reed
