= Ernest Reed =

Canadian Anglican bishop

Ernest Samuel Reed (February 13, 1909 – February 28, 1970) was a Canadian Anglican bishop in the second half of the twentieth century.

Reed was born in Dublin, Ireland.

Reed was educated at the University of Manitoba and ordained in 1931. He began his ordained ministry with a curacy in Rupertsland and then held incumbencies at Cowansville, Noranda and Montreal after which he was Archdeacon of Gaspé. From 1954 until his death in 1970, at the age of 61 years, he was the fourth Bishop of Ottawa.

Anglican Communion titles
Preceded by Robert Jefferson	Bishop of Ottawa; 1954 –1970	Succeeded by William James Robinson
