= John Baycroft =

Canadian bishop (born 1933)

The Rt Revd John Baycroft MA(Cantab) BD
- Director, Anglican Centre in Rome & Archbishop's Representative to the Holy See
- Church: Church of England
- In office: 1999–2001
- Predecessor: Bruce Ruddock
- Successor: Richard Garrard
- Other posts: Honorary assistant bishop in Ottawa (?–present); Bishop of Ottawa (1992–1999); Suffragan Bishop of Ottawa (1986–1992); Dean of Ottawa (1984–1986)

Orders
- Ordination: 1954 (deacon); 1956 (priest)
- Consecration: 1984

Personal details
- Born: 2 June 1933 (age 93) Redcar, N. Yorks, England, U.K.
- Denomination: Anglican
- Parents: Robert & Mary Williams
- Spouse: Joan Lake (m. 1956)
- Children: 1 son; 2 daughters
- Profession: Author
- Education: Christ's College, Cambridge

John Arthur Baycroft (born 2 June 1933) is a Canadian Anglican bishop.

Baycroft was born in Redcar, North Yorkshire, was educated at Sir William Turner School, Redcar and Christ's College, Cambridge and ordained in 1956. He held incumbencies in Loughborough, Ontario, Ottawa and Perth, Ontario before becoming Dean of Ottawa in 1984. From 1986 to 1992, he was suffragan bishop of Ottawa and then its diocesan until 1999.

Anglican Communion titles
Preceded by Edwin Keith Lackey	Bishop of Ottawa; 1992–1999	Succeeded by Peter Coffin
Preceded by Bruce Ruddock	Director of the Anglican Centre in Rome and Representative of the Archbishop of Canterbury to the Holy See; 1999–2001	Succeeded by Richard Garrard
