= Benjamin Lett =

Canadian insurgent (1813–1858)

Benjamin Lett (14 November 1813 – 9 December 1858) was an Anglo-Irish-Canadian filibusterer who was a disciple of William Lyon Mackenzie.

Although he did not participate in the Upper Canada Rebellion, Lett was charged in 1838 with the murder of Captain Edgeworth Ussher who had piloted the boats of Allan Napier MacNab during what would come to be known as the Caroline affair. On the night of 16 November 1838, Ussher was roused from his bed to answer a knock on the door, only to be killed by a shot fired through a window.

Fleeing to the United States, in January 1839, Lett unsuccessfully attempted to burn British ships anchored at Kingston. That July, joined by Samuel Peters Hart and Henry J. Moon, the three embarked on a raid in Cobourg to rob and kill Robert Henry and abduct Sheppard McCormick, a veteran of the attack on the Caroline. However, word leaked out and the plot was foiled with Lett just managing to escape to the American side of Lake Ontario. In the wake of the "Cobourg conspiracy" Lieutenant Governor Sir George Arthur posted a reward of £500 for his capture. In March 1841 Lett attempted to burn the SS Minos but failed.

On 17 April 1840 came the act Lett is best known for; the bombing of the monument to British general Sir Isaac Brock near Queenston, Ontario. The explosion did serious and irreparable damage to the monument although it failed to bring it down. Although Lett was presumed to have orchestrated the plot, a subsequent Assizes (court hearing) failed to confirm this.

On or about 5 June 1840 in Oswego, New York, Lett attempted to burn the British steamship Great Britain while she was leaving the harbour. Shortly before departure, a man identifying himself as "Bill Johnson" boarded the ship, placing a package containing three gunpowder-filled jars connected to a lit slow match at the door to the ladies' cabin. A few minutes after departing the Oswego wharf, the package exploded. However the damage was limited to a few broken windows in the ladies' cabin and the skylight above. Returning to dock, "Bill Johnson" and his accomplice, Benjamin Lett were shortly apprehended. While being transported on the Auburn and Syracuse Railroad to serve a seven-year prison sentence for the crime, the shackled Lett escaped from the railroad car he was in and leaped to freedom when the train was within a few miles of its destination of Auburn, New York. This brought an additional $350 bounty for his capture; $250 by Governor William H. Seward and $100 by the Sheriff.

Lett was also suspected of having been responsible for the bombing of Lock #37 (Allanburg) of the first Welland Canal on 9 September of the next year. However, his luck in evading authorities on both sides of the border came to an end and that same month, he was captured in Buffalo, N.Y. and placed in solitary confinement in the Auburn prison. There he was mistreated, leading to his pardon in 1845 by the Governor of New York, Silas Wright.

In 1858 Lett was hired by whiskey maker Jonathan Reed in Earlville, Illinois to destroy the town school in retaliation for the mob of citizens that had destroyed his stock claiming it was poisoning the citizens. On 13 September 1858, the school exploded and during the resulting fire Lett and three others were arrested, with Lett being shot during his arrest.

While en route to Lake Michigan for a trading expedition, Lett died mysteriously of strychnine poisoning in Milwaukee. His brother Thomas would later claim that Tory agents were behind his death. He was buried in the Lette Cemetery, Northville, IL.
