= Eric Wall =

British Anglican bishop

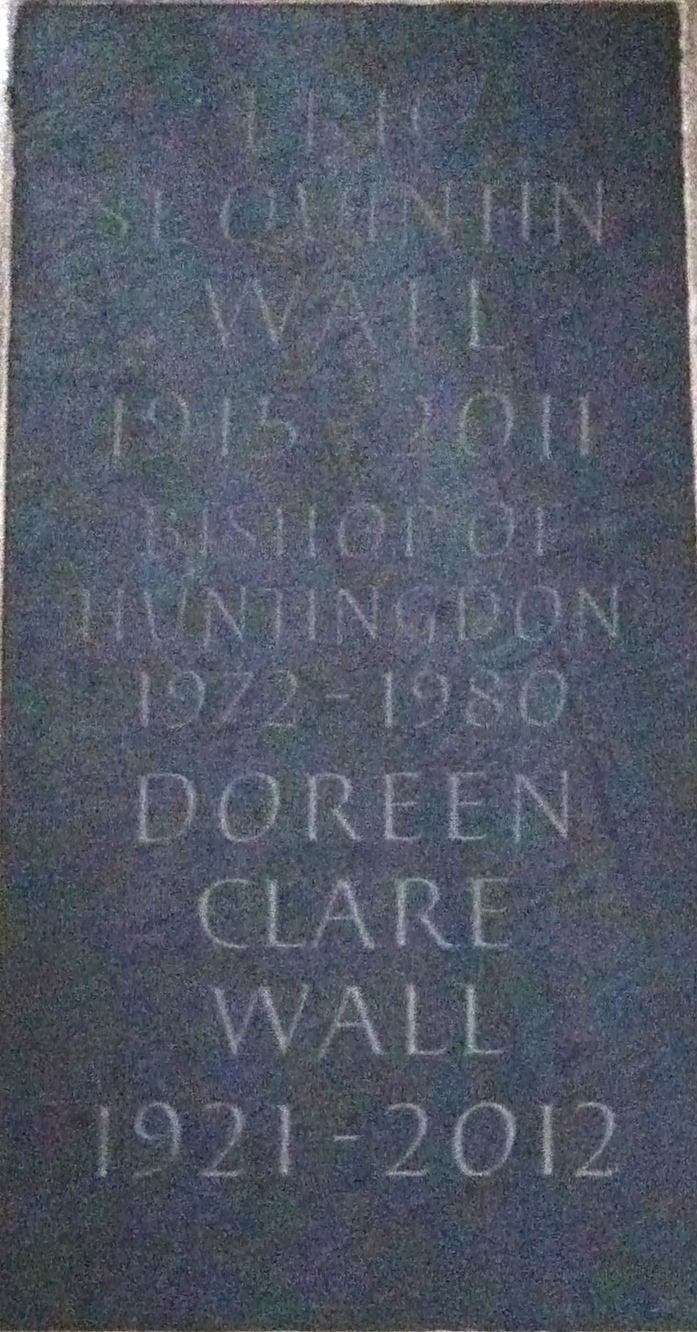
Memorial to Wall in Ely Cathedral

Eric St Quintin Wall (19 April 1915 – 11 April 2011) was the second Bishop of Huntingdon from 1972 to 1980 and from then on an Assistant Bishop within the Diocese of Gloucester. The son of a clergyman – Sydney Herbert Wall —, he was born on 19 April 1915 and educated at Clifton College and Brasenose College, Oxford. Ordained in 1939 he began his ecclesiastical career with a curacy in Boston, Lincolnshire after which he was a World War II chaplain in the RAFVR. When peace returned he held incumbencies at Malmesbury, Cricklade and then finally (before his appointment to the episcopate) at Westbury Park, Bristol.

Church of England titles
Preceded by Robert Martineau	Bishop of Huntingdon; 1972–1980	Succeeded by Gordon Roe
