= H.F. Hamilton =

Canadian theologian and academic (1876–1919)

Harold Francis Hamilton MA, DD (died 1919), was a Canadian theologian and ecclesiastical historian of the Church of England in the Dominion of Canada. He was born in Quebec City in 1876. His father, Charles Hamilton, was a clergyman who in 1884 was elevated to the episcopate.

He was educated at Trinity College School at Port Hope, Ontario, and Christ Church, Oxford. He taught for some years at the University of Bishop's College in Lennoxville, Quebec. He died on December 20, 1919.

He is best known as the author of The People of God, a two-volume work much admired by Michael Ramsey (among others), and Discovery and Revelation, a work of a more popular character.

== See also ==
- Bishop's University

== Notes ==
"Harold Francis Hamilton MA, DD", FamilySearch
