= Edgeworth Ussher =

British loyalist in Upper Canada

Captain Edgeworth Usher (c. 1804 – November 16, 1838) was a British Loyalist. He served in the 3rd Regiment of the Lincoln Militia during the 1837 Upper Canada Rebellion. He was reportedly murdered by Benjamin Lett on the front step of his home, Milford Lodge, for his participation in the destruction of the American vessel steamer Caroline.

== Biography ==
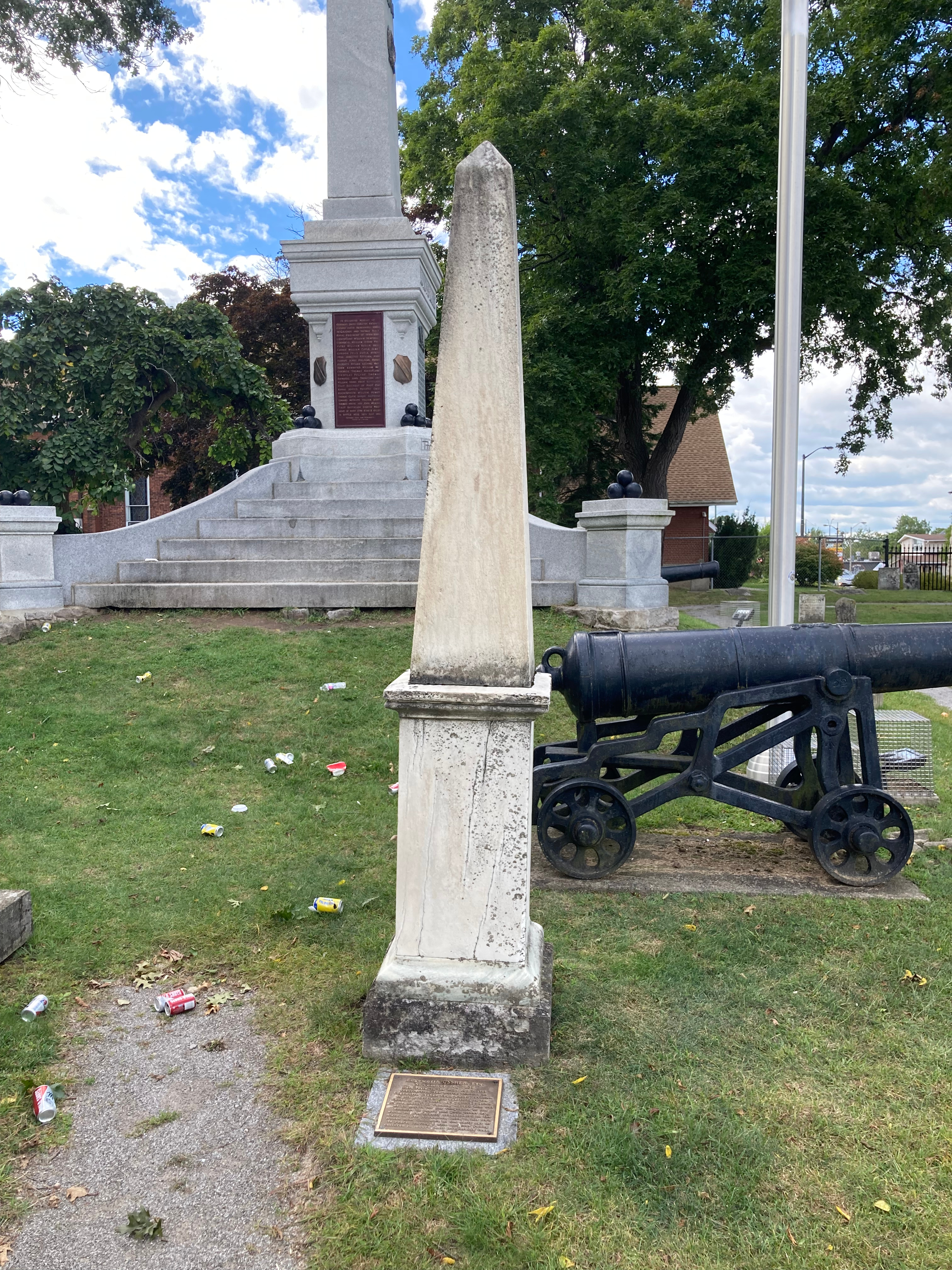
Ussher's grave at Drummond Hill Cemetery

Edgeworth was the son of Captain John Ussher and Mary Street, daughter of Samuel Street. He married Sarah Thompson and had four children. Mary Ussher (died young), Emily Augusta Ussher, John Frederick Campbell Ussher, and Victoria Ussher. Victoria Ussher was baptised Edgeworth Victoria Ussher after her father's death.

Edgeworth Ussher was shot to death at the door of his home in November 1838. He was buried at Drummond Hill Cemetery in Niagara Falls, Ontario.

Inscription on his tombstone:

Here rests in the hope of a joyful resurrection the mortal remains of Edgeworth Ussher, Esq., whose devotion to his sovereign and exertions in the cause of his country at a critical period in the history of Canada marked him out as an object of the vengeance of the enemies of peace and good order, by whom he was cruelly assassinated on the night of 16 Nov., 1838, in his own house near Chippawa, at the early age of 34 years, leaving a wife and four children to mourn their irreparable loss.

== Places and things named after Edgeworth Ussher ==
- Ussher's Creek (originally named Street's Creek for Samuel Street) is where the battle of Chippawa began on July 5, 1814
- Edgeworth Road in Niagara Falls (Ontario, Canada)
- "Edgeworth Ussher" Hole #6 - Usshers Creek Course at Legends on the Niagara
- Usshers Creek Estate Homes

== See also ==
- Johnny Ussher - nephew of Edgeworth Ussher
