= St. Matthew's Anglican Church (Toronto) =

Church in Toronto, Ontario

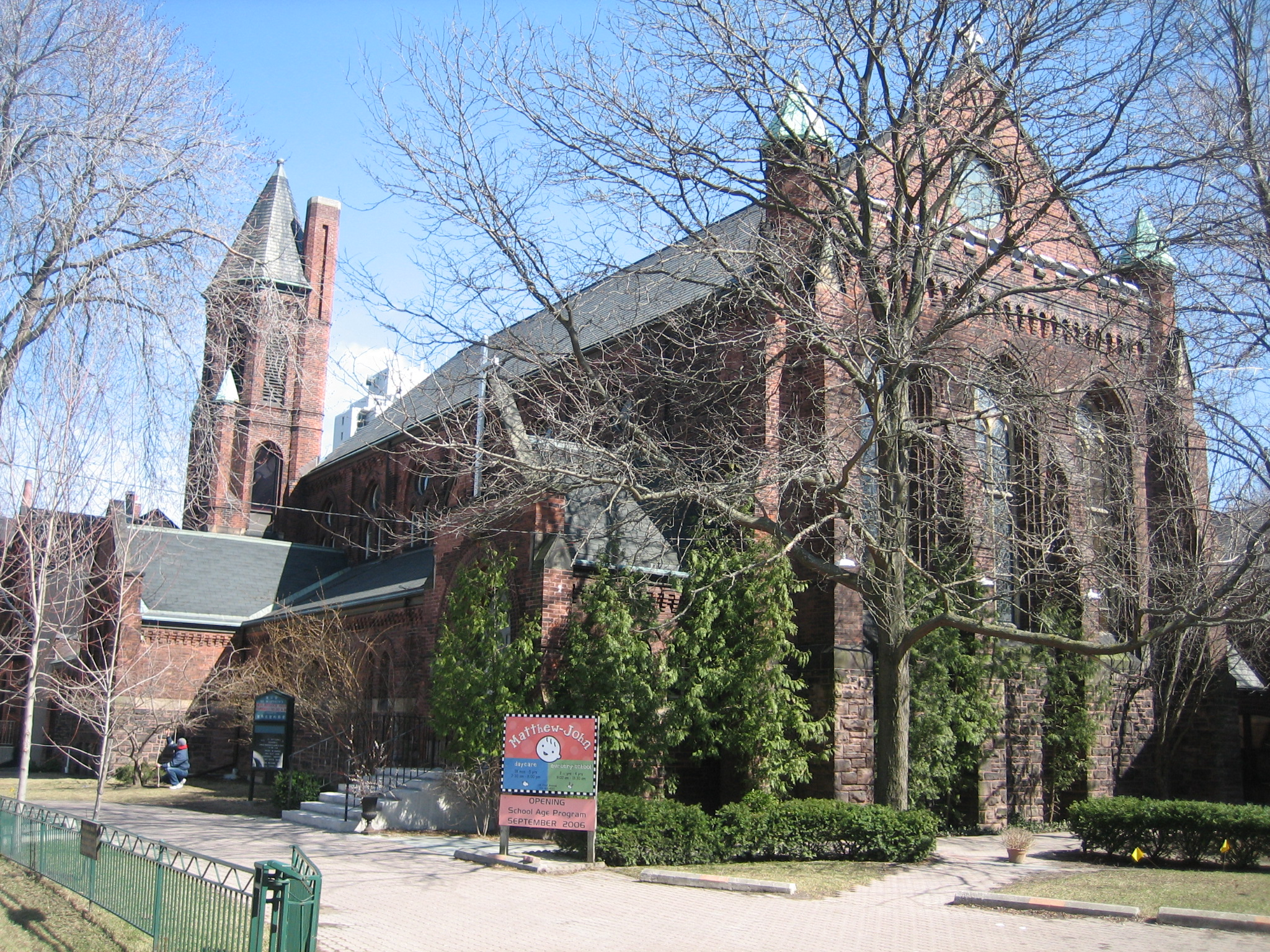
- St. Matthew's Anglican Church in 2009
- Interactive map of St. Matthew's Anglican Church
- 43.6656°N 79.3465°W
- Location: Riverdale, Toronto

History
- Built: 1889

Site notes
- Architect(s): Strickland & Symons

Ontario Heritage Act
- Official name: St. Matthew's Anglican Church and Church Hall
- Designated: October 27, 2009
- Reference no.: 2455

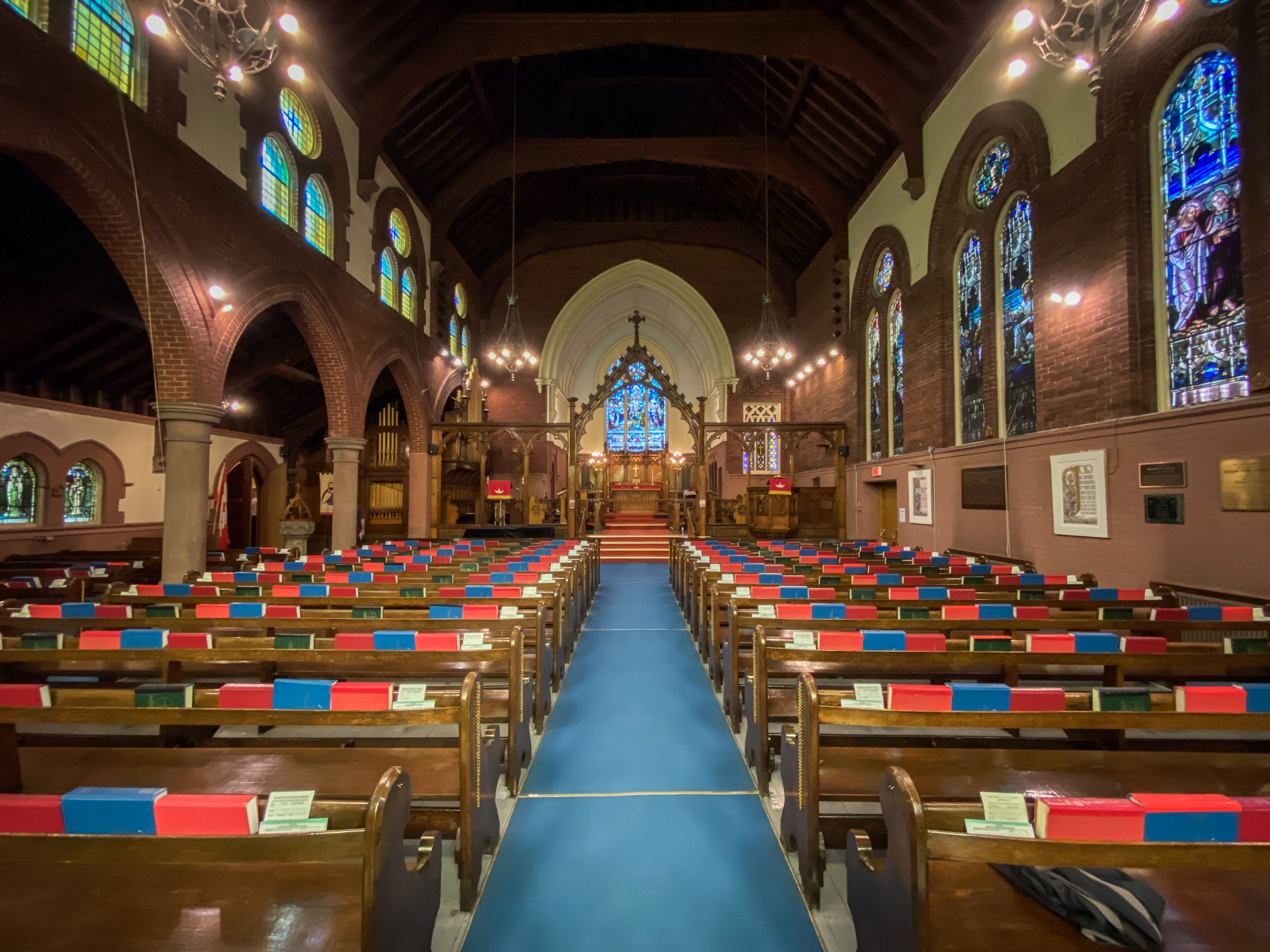
Church interior

St. Matthew's Riverdale (officially St Matthew First Avenue) is a church in Riverdale, Toronto, located at 135 First Avenue. It has been listed on the Ontario Heritage Register, pursuant to the Ontario Heritage Act, since October 27, 2009. It was designed by Strickland & Symons, a partnership between Walter Reginald Strickland and William L. Symons.

== Current ==
Today, St. Matthew's is home to a worshipping Anglican community with services of Holy Communion every Sunday at 10:30am. The current rector is the Rev. Karen Koiter, who has been serving at St. Matthew's since September 2026.

== History ==
Plans to develop the church began in 1887 and plans to complete it were approved in April 1889. A portion of the property was gifted to the congregation, and another sold at a low price. Construction finished in 1889. It opened for services on Easter 1890. The total cost to build St. Matthew's was about CA$20,000, or approximately equivalent to $759,000 in 2025.

== Design ==
As of 1904, shortly after St. Matthew's was constructed, its roof was open-timbered with six principal rafters, fitted with tracing and curved braces, with the rafters exposed. The choir was finished in pressed brick and oak panelling, while the walls were finished in colour, with arched ceiling ribbed into panels. The walls of the church were made of red brick, with brown Credit Valley stone, with Ohio stone dressings. The screen separating the choir from the nave was made of carved oak in the later Gothic style and the central arch was ornamented by a cross, which was slightly out of proportion in height to the size of the screen.

An issue of the Dominion Churchman published on August 22, 1889, stated that the church's interior would be finished in stucco, while the window and door trimmings and dados would be of brick. The sanctuary would be finished in pressed brick, sedilia, and piscina in Portage Entry stone, while the walls and ceilings of the sanctuary above the brickwork would be decorated in colour and bronze.

Carpentry was done by Davidson & Kelly, the brickwork by John Smith, the stone work by Yorke of Front Street, the glazing by McCauslands, and the gas fittings by Keith & Fitzsimmons.

== Sources ==
- Robertson, John Ross (1904). Robertson's Landmarks of Toronto. 4th series. Toronto. pp. 103–105.
