= Nigel Shaw =

Canadian Anglican Bishop

Nigel Shaw is a Canadian Anglican Bishop.

Shaw was educated at the University of Toronto; and ordained in 1985. He was a Chaplain with the Canadian Armed Forces from 1986 until his election as Bishop of the Anglican Military Ordinariate in 2016.
