= Arthur Weston (priest) =

Australian Anglican priest

Arthur Edward Weston was an Australian Anglican priest in the mid-twentieth century.

Weston was educated at St John's College, Armidale, and was ordained in 1922. After a curacy at All Saints' Cathedral, Bathurst, he was Rector of Parkes, then Archdeacon of Bathurst from 1934 to 1936. He was Rector of Norwood from 1936 to 1947, then of Glenelg until 1957; Archdeacon of Strathalbyn from 1939 to 1953; and Dean of Adelaide from 1957 until 1966.

Religious titles
Preceded by Thomas Thornton Reed	Dean of Adelaide; 1957–1966	Succeeded by Lionel Edward William Renfrey
