= Bishop of Huntingdon =

Anglican suffragan bishop in England

The Bishop of Huntingdon is an episcopal title used by a suffragan bishop of the Church of England Diocese of Ely, in the Province of Canterbury, England. The title takes its name after Huntingdon, the historic county town of Huntingdonshire, England.

== List of Bishops of Huntingdon ==
Bishops of Huntingdon
From	Until	Incumbent	Notes
1966	1972	Robert Martineau	Translated to Blackburn
1972	1980	Eric Wall	
1980	1997	Gordon Roe	
1997	2003	John Flack	
2003	2007	John Inge	Translated to Worcester
2008	2018	David Thomson	Formerly Archdeacon of Carlisle; retired 30 September 2018.
2019	present	Dagmar Winter	previously Rector of Hexham Abbey; consecrated 3 July 2019.
