= Edwin Lackey =

Canadian Anglican bishop (1929-1992)

Edwin Keith Lackey was a Canadian Anglican bishop in the second half of the 20th century.

Lackey was born on 10 June 1929 and educated at Bishop's University, Lennoxville. Ordained in 1954, he began his ministry with a curacy in Cornwall, Ontario and then held incumbencies at Russell, Vankleek Hill and St Michael and All Angels, Ottawa. He was then Director of Programmes and Archdeacon of the Diocese of Ottawa before his ordination to the episcopate as the 6th Bishop of Ottawa in 1981. In 1991 he was appointed Metropolitan of Ontario. He died on 9 January 1992.

Anglican Communion titles
Preceded by William James Robinson	Bishop of Ottawa; 1981 –1992	Succeeded by John Arthur Baycroft
Preceded by John Charles Bothwell	Metropolitan of Ontario; 1991 –1992	Succeeded by Percival Richard O’Driscoll
