= David Richardson (priest) =

Australian Anglican priest (born 1946)

The Very Reverend Canon David Richardson AO OBE
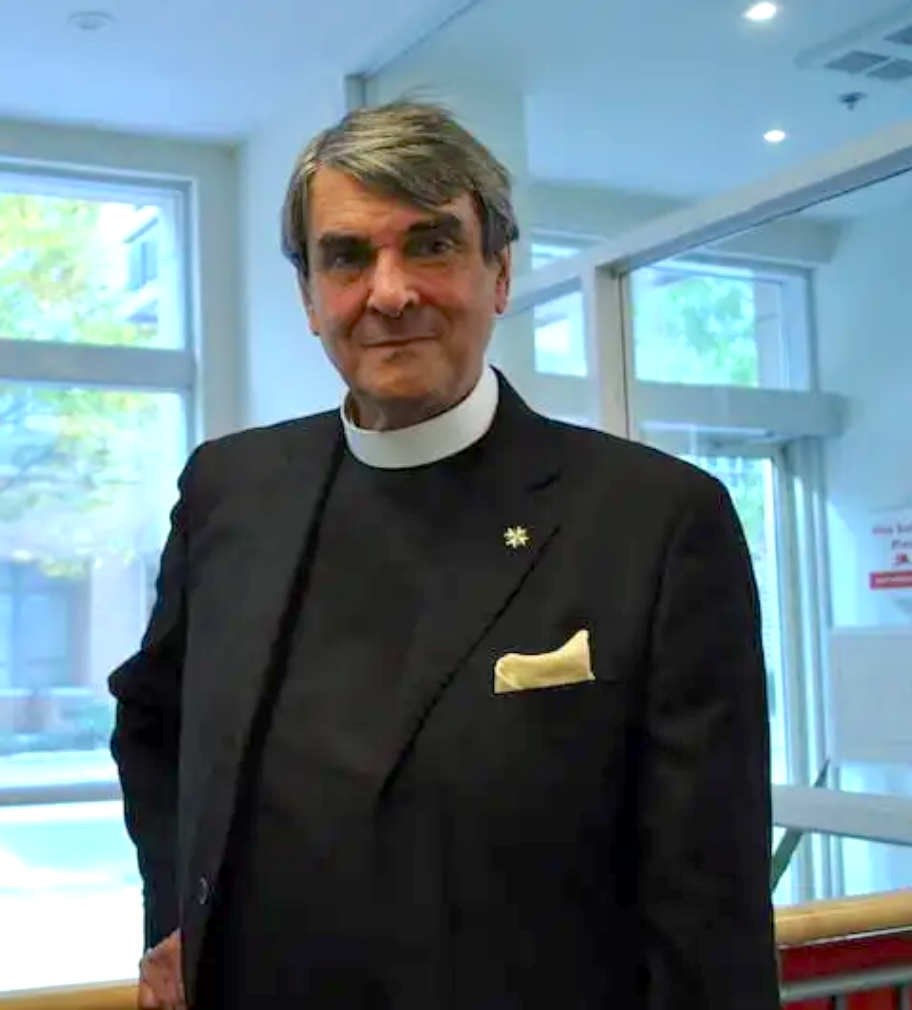
- Born: 14 March 1946 (age 80); Townsville, Queensland
- Died: 6 May 2026; Adelaide, South Australia
- Education: University of Queensland, University of Birmingham
- Occupation: Priest
- Title: Emeritus Dean of Melbourne
- Spouse: Margaret (m. 1972)
- Children: 2
- Other posts: Representative of the Archbishop of Canterbury to the Holy See and director of the Anglican Centre in Rome (2008–2013); Dean of Melbourne (1999–2008); Dean of Adelaide (1989–1999)

Orders
- Ordination: 1970 (deacon); 1971 (priest)

Personal details
- Denomination: Anglican

David John Leyburn Richardson (1946-2026) was an Australian Anglican priest, liturgist, ecumenist, cathedral dean and director of the Anglican Centre in Rome.

== Early life and ministry ==
David Richardson was born in Townsville, Queensland, as the youngest of three brothers, He spent most of his childhood in England where his father worked as a priest, first in North Devon and then in the Midlands. He finished his schooling at the Anglican (formerly Church of England) Grammar School, Brisbane, (known as "Churchie"), where he was a member of the chapel choir and the debating society.

After completing a degree in English literature at the University of Queensland, Richardson studied theology at St Barnabas College in Adelaide. He was ordained as deacon in 1970 and as priest in 1971 in the diocese of Brisbane. He was an assistant priest in parishes in Maryborough (1971-73) and Ipswich (1973-74), then priest-in-charge of East Ipswich (1974-75).

Richardson returned to the United Kingdom in 1975 to undertake a postgraduate diploma in pastoral theology at the University of Birmingham. He served a curacy at the Church of St Mary the Great, Cambridge, the civic and university church of Cambridge, in the diocese of Ely, while also working as the chaplain of Girton College at the university from 1976 to 1979.

Back in Australia, he was appointed as chaplain to postulants (potential ordinands) in the diocese of Adelaide (1979) and returned to St Barnabas College as sub-warden where he taught New Testament studies, liturgy, pastoral care and spirituality (1980-82). Following this, Richardson moved back to Queensland to become rector of Christ Church St Lucia (1982-88) and an examining chaplain (1983-87).

== Cathedral dean ==
In 1988, Richardson took up the position of rector of St Peter’s Cathedral, Adelaide (1988-89), and an examining chaplain (1988-99). The following year, he was appointed as the first person to fill the newly-created position of dean of St Peter's Cathedral, Adelaide, leading the cathedral for 11 years.

His next appointment was in 1999 when Richardson became the thirteenth dean of St Paul's Cathedral, Melbourne. At St Paul's, he led a public appeal which raised 18 million dollars to restore the cathedral's spires and improve the interior of the building. His contribution is commemorated by the 2009 stone sculpture of his head created by Melbourne artist Smiley Williams and carved by Daryl Gilbert high up on the exterior of the cathedral's central "Moorhouse" spire. He also developed the music at St Paul's, creating the new position of "Dean's Chorister".

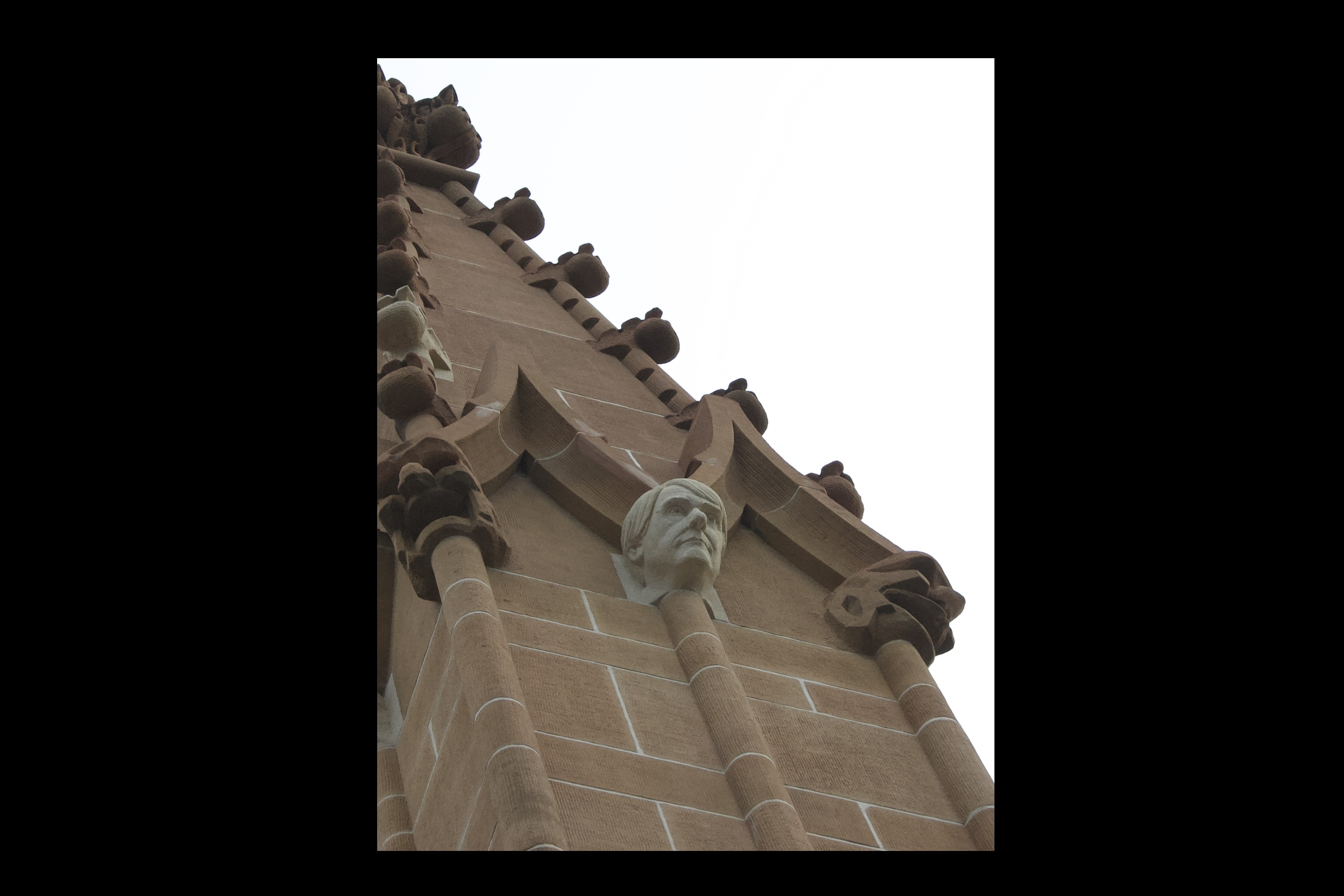
Sculpture of David Richardson on St Paul's Cathedral spire.

In 2003, Richardson was publicly criticised for the decision to hang a large banner on a cathedral spire facing Swanston Street with the words "Peace not War" as a protest against the Iraq War. He responded: "If the cathedral can't witness to the Prince of Peace, who can?"

On his departure from St Paul's in 2008, the cathedral chapter awarded Richardson the title of Dean Emeritus. This honour recognised "his ministry in two metropolitan cathedrals (Adelaide and Melbourne) for the past two decades, his marvellous achievement in restoring the building of St Paul’s Cathedral, and his ministry which built up the attendances and finances in Melbourne".

At the conclusion of his tenure as dean, Richardson reflected on the impact the role had made on his ministry:

...Melbourne matured me, and helped me to look for other interpretations, explanations, and nuances, than the one that immediately hits you in the face. And so I suppose [I’ve gained] a level of theological reflection, of being able to talk to people, get beside people, and understand where they’re coming from.

=== Wider church leadership ===
Richardson was for 10 years the clerical representative for Australia on the Anglican Consultative Council (1992–2002). He was also a member of the Anglican Church of Australia's General Synod (1988-2007) and its standing committee (1989-2007). Richardson also participated in Australian and international Anglican-Catholic ecumenical bodies including the Australian Consultation on Liturgy and the Malines Conversations Group.

=== Liturgical contributions ===
Richardson was a long-serving member of the Australian National Liturgical Commission (1982-2004) and was its executive secretary from 1985 to 2004. As a member of the commission, he was one of the authors of A Prayer Book for Australia and was the writer of Thanksgiving 2 within the Second Order Holy Communion service (1995). This Eucharistic prayer represented an innovation in Australian Anglican worship by drawing on the institution narrative in Mark's Gospel instead of the more commonly used Pauline sources.

== Anglican Centre in Rome ==
In December 2007, Richardson was appointed as the representative of the Archbishop of Canterbury, Rowan Williams, to the Holy See and the director of the Anglican Centre in Rome. He was installed in this position by Archbishop Williams in May 2008 at a ceremony in the Church of Santa Maria sopra Minerva. His responsibilities included running courses on spirituality and prayer and visiting countries including the UK, Canada and New Zealand to foster Anglican-Catholic dialogue and promote the work of the Anglican Centre.

Describing his approach to the directorship, Richardson stressed the centrality of teaching and learning:

...while it is thought of as ambassadorial, [the role is] essentially educational for it is about interpreting differing experiences of faith-stories, helping to dissolve unthinking pre-judgements with knowledge, to provide opportunities for people of differing beliefs and experiences of faith and life to meet God's truth in the unexpected.

During his tenure Richardson played key roles in the 2008 Lambeth Conference, the first state visit of a pope to the UK in 2010 (Pope Benedict XVI) and visits of the Archbishop of Canterbury to the Vatican in 2009 and 2012. He also hosted the first visit of a head of state to the centre (Australian prime minister Kevin Rudd) in 2009 and was an official Anglican delegate to the inauguration of Pope Francis in 2013.

One of Richardson's achievements was the co-drafting of an ecumenical "covenant" between the Anglican Centre and the Caravita Catholic Community (Oratory of San Francesco Saverio del Caravita in Rome) in April 2013. This affirmed the two organisations' commonalities of faith and mission and committed them to working together. The covenant was renewed in 2024 by the serving Archbishop of Canterbury.

Richardson's time in office coincided with what he called the "surprising" 2009 announcement by the Vatican of a provision to allow groups of Anglicans to join the Catholic Church while retaining several Anglican distinctives, including married clergy. He also witnessed the first resignation of a pope in the modern era (Benedict XVI in February 2013).

=== Later life ===
He retired from the Anglican Centre in Rome in April 2013 and was succeeded by Archbishop David Moxon. He returned to Australia where he was locum dean of St George's Cathedral, Perth (2014), and honorary associate priest at All Saints', Kooyong, in Melbourne (2021-2026).

== Honours and awards ==
Richardson was a chaplain of the Most Venerable Order of the Hospital of Saint John of Jerusalem (Order of St John) (ChStJ) from 1996 onward.

He was appointed an officer of the Order of the British Empire (OBE) in the 2013 Queen's Birthday Honours (UK) for services to strengthening relations between the UK, the Anglican Communion and the Holy See.

Richardson was named an officer of the Order of Australia (AO) in the 2016 Australia Day Honours for distinguished service to religion and to the Anglican Church of Australia, through international representational, ecumenical development and interfaith co-operation roles.

He was installed as one of four honorary provincial canons of Canterbury Cathedral in June 2010 and was an honorary provincial emeritus canon from 2013 onward.

Anglican Communion titles
Preceded by James Grant	Dean of Melbourne; 1999–2008	Succeeded by Mark Burton
Preceded by John Flack	Director of the Anglican Centre in Rome and Representative of the Archbishop of Canterbury to the Holy See; 2008–2013	Succeeded by David Moxon
