= Anglican Diocese of Ottawa =

Diocese of the Anglican Church in Canada

Diocese of Ottawa

Location
- Country: Canada
- Ecclesiastical province: Ontario
- Deaneries: 10
- Coordinates: 45°25′03″N 75°42′33″W

Statistics
- Parishes: 68 (2022)
- Members: 8,809 (2022)

Information
- Denomination: Anglican Church of Canada
- Rite: Anglican
- Established: April 7, 1896
- Cathedral: Christ Church Cathedral, Ottawa

Current leadership
- Bishop: Kathryn Otley

Map
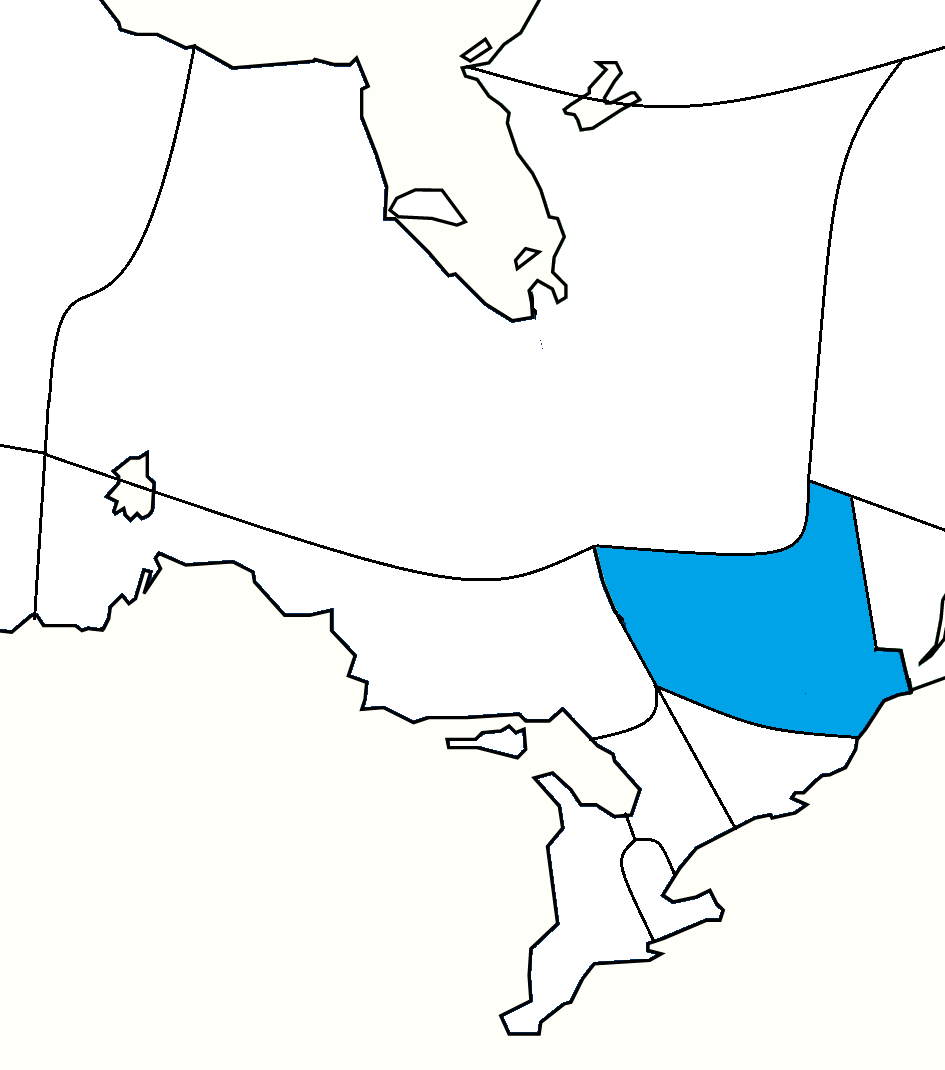
- The boundaries of the diocese within the Ecclesiastical Province of Ontario.

Website
- ottawa.anglican.ca

The Diocese of Ottawa is a diocese of the Ecclesiastical Province of Ontario of the Anglican Church of Canada, itself a province of the Anglican Communion, in Ottawa, Ontario, Canada. The diocese was established on April 7, 1896.

== Bishops of Ottawa ==
No.	Name	Dates	Notes
1	Charles Hamilton	1896-1914	Metropolitan of Canada, 1896-1914
2	Charles Roper	1915-1939	Metropolitan of Ontario, 1933-1939
3	Robert Jefferson	1939-1954	
4	Ernest Reed	1954-1970	
5	William Robinson	1970-1981	
6	Edwin Lackey	1981-1992	Metropolitan of Ontario, 1991-1992
7	John Baycroft	1992-1999	suffragan 1986 to 1992
8	Peter Coffin	1999-2007	also Bishop Ordinary to Canadian Forces, 2004
9	John Chapman	2007-2020	suffragan Kent Clarke
10	Shane Parker	2020-2025	previously dean of Ottawa and rector of Christ Church Cathedral; resigned to become Primate of the Anglican Church of Canada
11	Kathryn Otley	2026–present	
