= Same-sex marriage in British Columbia =

Same-sex marriage has been legal in British Columbia since July 8, 2003, after a series of court rulings in Barbeau v. British Columbia which ultimately landed in favour of same-sex couples seeking marriage licences. This made British Columbia the second province in Canada, the second jurisdiction in North America and the fourth in the world, after the Netherlands, Belgium and Ontario, to legalise same-sex marriage.

== Legal history ==
=== Background ===
On July 4, 1995, the Legislative Assembly of British Columbia approved the Adoption Act, permitting cohabiting same-sex couples to adopt children jointly. British Columbia became the first province in Canada to allow same-sex couples to adopt. The law took effect on November 4, 1996.

In July 1997, the New Democratic Party government of Premier Glen Clark introduced bills to recognise "the marriage-like relationship between persons of the same gender" in the Family Relations Act and the Family Maintenance Enforcement Act, granting same-sex couples the same legal rights as married spouses with regard to child custody and maintenance. Despite opposition from religious groups, the bills were passed overwhelmingly in the Legislative Assembly, and received royal assent by Lieutenant Governor Garde Gardom.

=== Barbeau v. British Columbia ===
==== Judgement ====
In July 2001, eight same-sex couples filed a lawsuit in court, Barbeau v. British Columbia, arguing that banning same-sex marriage violated the Charter rights of gays and lesbians. On October 2, 2001, British Columbia Supreme Court Justice Ian Pitfield ruled against same-sex marriage, arguing it was not allowed under the Canadian Constitution. "Parliament may not enact legislation to change the legal meaning of marriage to include same-sex unions," he said. "I concur in the submission of the Attorney General of Canada that the core distinction between same-sex and opposite-sex relationships is so material in the Canadian context that no means exist by which to equate same-sex relationships to marriage while at the same time preserving the fundamental importance of marriage to the community." Justice Pitfield would be the sole judge in Canada to rule against same-sex couples. The couples appealed the decision to the Court of Appeal.

On May 1, 2003, justices of the British Columbia Court of Appeal ruled 3–0 that the denial of marriage licences to same-sex couples was a violation of the Canadian Charter of Rights and Freedoms. "Gay rights have steadily expanded since homosexuality was made legal in Canada in 1969, and these developments have substantial public support, although the matter remains controversial," the court wrote. "This evolution cannot be ignored. Civil marriage should adapt to contemporary notions of marriage as an institution in a society which recognizes the rights of homosexual persons to non-discriminatory treatment." The court gave the Government of Canada until July 2, 2004 to change the definition of marriage to include same-sex couples, similar to the ruling issued in Ontario. On July 8, 2003, the Court of Appeal issued another ruling, lifting the stay it had put on the government in its May decision. The court said it was "satisfied" and noted the Ontario Court of Appeal lifting the stay in its own ruling in June 2003. The ruling stated that "any further delay will result in an unequal application of the law between Ontario and British Columbia." A few hours after the Court of Appeal ruling, Antony Porcino and Tom Graff became the first two men to be legally wed in British Columbia. Two conservative religious groups attempted to appeal the decision to the Supreme Court of Canada but, as they only had party intervenor status in the case, their attempt was unsuccessful. Several of the plaintiff couples, many of whom had been in a relationship for decades, announced they would marry in the coming months or year.

==== Reactions and aftermath ====
Craig Maynard, spokesman for Egale Canada, said that they were "thrilled by this decision", and said they would continue to push for the legalisation of same-sex marriage across Canada. Kathleen Lahey, who was a counsel to the couples, said that the court decision "confirms that the new federal law on same-sex marriage applies uniformly across the country -- and immediately. It also makes it clear that other provinces can and should act now to extend marriage to lesbian and gay couples, instead of putting the issue off until the Supreme Court of Canada and Parliament have confirmed the new law." A spokesperson for the Roman Catholic Archdiocese of Vancouver said the diocese was "saddened" by the decision, "We're also concerned that the courts have taken over the role of legislating in our democracy. This way of making important public decisions is very wrong. A third point of concern is the impact this will have on churches and religious freedom. The prime minister has given a guarantee with respect to religious freedom, but he can't give us a guarantee with respect to what the courts might do", the spokesperson said. Anglican Bishop Michael Ingham said he was "glad gay and lesbian people are receiving recognition of their equality rights", but that the Anglican Church would "still regard marriage as a union between husband and wife": "It goes considerably further than the church has gone. We have spoken of unions and not marriage. That remains the position of our diocese. I'm glad gay and lesbian people are receiving recognition of their equality rights, but it goes beyond where we are in the church. We still regard marriage as a union between husband and wife."

In August 2003, Celia Kitzinger and Sue Wilkinson married in Yaletown. They returned to England and demanded that it recognise their marriage. This was the beginning of the marriage equality movement in the United Kingdom, but the High Court of Justice ruled against the couple in July 2006.

On June 15, 2005, a Supreme Court judge in Nanaimo granted British Columbia's first same-sex divorce in the case of J.S. v. C.F.. Although same-sex marriage had been legal in British Columbia for two years, the Divorce Act still defined marriage as being "between a man and a woman". The judge, Madame Justice Laura Gerow, with the consent of the Attorney General, Irwin Cotler, changed the Divorce Act to include same-sex couples.

=== Provincial legislation ===
On November 23, 2011, the Legislative Assembly enacted the Family Law Act, which uses gender-neutral language with regard to married spouses. The Assembly also amended the Marriage Act to replace all references to "husband and wife" with the gender-neutral term "spouses". The legislation, which received royal assent by Lieutenant Governor Steven Point, amended provincial law to read that each of the parties to a marriage, in the presence of a marriage commissioner and at least two witnesses, says to the other:

I call on those present to witness that I, A.B., take C.D. to be my lawful wedded wife (or husband) (or spouse). [RSBC 1996, c 282, s 20(c)]

== First Nations ==
While the Indian Act (French: Loi sur les Indiens) (Note: In some of British Columbia's Indigenous languages: Haida: X̱aadas Kihl yahda; Haisla: C̓élc̓elksc̓uaqiala Núyemzis; Halkomelem: Xʷélmexʷ Snəw̓əyəɬ; Heiltsuk–Oowekyala: Híɫzaqv Ǧvi̓ḷás; Ktunaxa: ʔaqⱡsmaknik̓ ʔa·knumu¢tiⱡiⱡ; Lillooet: Úcwalmicw Nxékmen; North Strait Salish: W̱ILṈEW̱ SḴÁU; Nuxalk: Nuxalkmc Nunutsʼxlhuusnm; Okanagan: Sqilxʷ T̓q̓ʔípaʔstn; Sechelt: Sḵálmixw Slélattsut; Shuswap: Qelmecw7úw̓i Stk̓wemíple7; Squamish: Sḵwx̱wú7mesh Snew̓íyelh; Thompson: Ƛ̓ uʔsqáyxʷ Scutǝ́n; Tsimshian: Tsʼmsyen Ayaawx) governs many aspects of life for First Nations in Canada, it does not directly govern marriage or provide a framework for conducting customary marriages. Instead, marriage laws are primarily governed by provincial and territorial legislation. However, the Indian Act has some indirect impacts on marriage, particularly regarding band membership and property rights on reserves. The laws of various First Nation bands do not address same-sex marriages. The Lax Kw'alaams First Nation attempted to adopt a constitution safeguarding sexual orientation as a human right, but voters rejected this proposed constitution in a referendum on 9 April 2025. First Nations have deep-rooted marriage traditions, placing a strong emphasis on community, family and spiritual connections. For example, customary Haida marriages (gud iina g̱ihl) are a collective process of forming alliances between clans "practiced as a web of relationships that bind the human, natural, and Supernatural Beings of our world". Same-sex unions are not explicitly prohibited by traditional Indigenous law.

While there are no records of same-sex marriages being performed in First Nations cultures in the way they are commonly defined in Western legal systems, many Indigenous communities recognize identities and relationships that may be placed on the LGBT spectrum. Among these are two-spirit individuals—people who embody both masculine and feminine qualities. In some cultures, two-spirit individuals assigned male at birth wear women's clothing and engage in household and artistic work associated with the feminine sphere. Historically, this identity sometimes allowed for unions between two people of the same biological sex. The Haida refer to two-spirit individuals as ḵʼadx̱áan (pronounced [qʼʌ̀d̥χáːn]), and the Tsimshian as ma̱hana̱ʼa̱x (pronounced [mɒhæˈnɒʔɒχ]). The Nuxalk believe that two-spirit people are influenced in "some mysterious way" by the supernatural figure Sxints (pronounced [sχentsʰ]). Assigned male at birth, they wear women's clothing and take on roles traditionally associated with women. However, unlike two-spirit people in some other Indigenous cultures, they traditionally married cisgender women. They are known as tʼámiya (pronounced [ˈtʼæmi.jɛ]) in Halkomelem. Some Halkomelem-speaking two-spirit individuals also identify with the neologism stsʼiyáye smestíyexw, meaning "twin-spirit". Stó꞉lō intersex babies were sometimes left on Mount McGuire to die; "[Elders] couldn't tell its sex till about three years old; they didn't let them live unles [sic] found out only after grown, i.e. about three year old; the Chilliwacks left them to die up the mountain they called Tʼamiyahó꞉y." In the Okanagan language, two-spirit people are referred to as st̓ámyaʔ (pronounced [ˈstʼamjaʔ]).

Other nations also have distinct terms and respected roles for two-spirit people. The Nuu-chah-nulth refer to those born male as tuučuk (pronounced [ˈtuːtʃuk]), whereas those born female are čakusšƛ (pronounced [tʃaˈkusʃtɬ]). One famous Kutenai two-spirit person was Kaúxuma Núpika, who, after leaving his White fur trader husband, returned to his people and adopted men's clothing and weapons, and took a wife. Kaúxuma was one of the "principal leaders" of the tribe and supernatural powers were attributed to him. He "is remembered among the Kutenai as a respected shamanic healer", a masculine occupation. The Kutenai also recognise male-bodied two-spirit people who wear women's clothing and perform women's activities. They would "participate in gathering berries [and] roots, and also in making baskets and mats, in preparing lily seeds for consumption, and in cooking meals", and would marry men.

== Marriage statistics ==
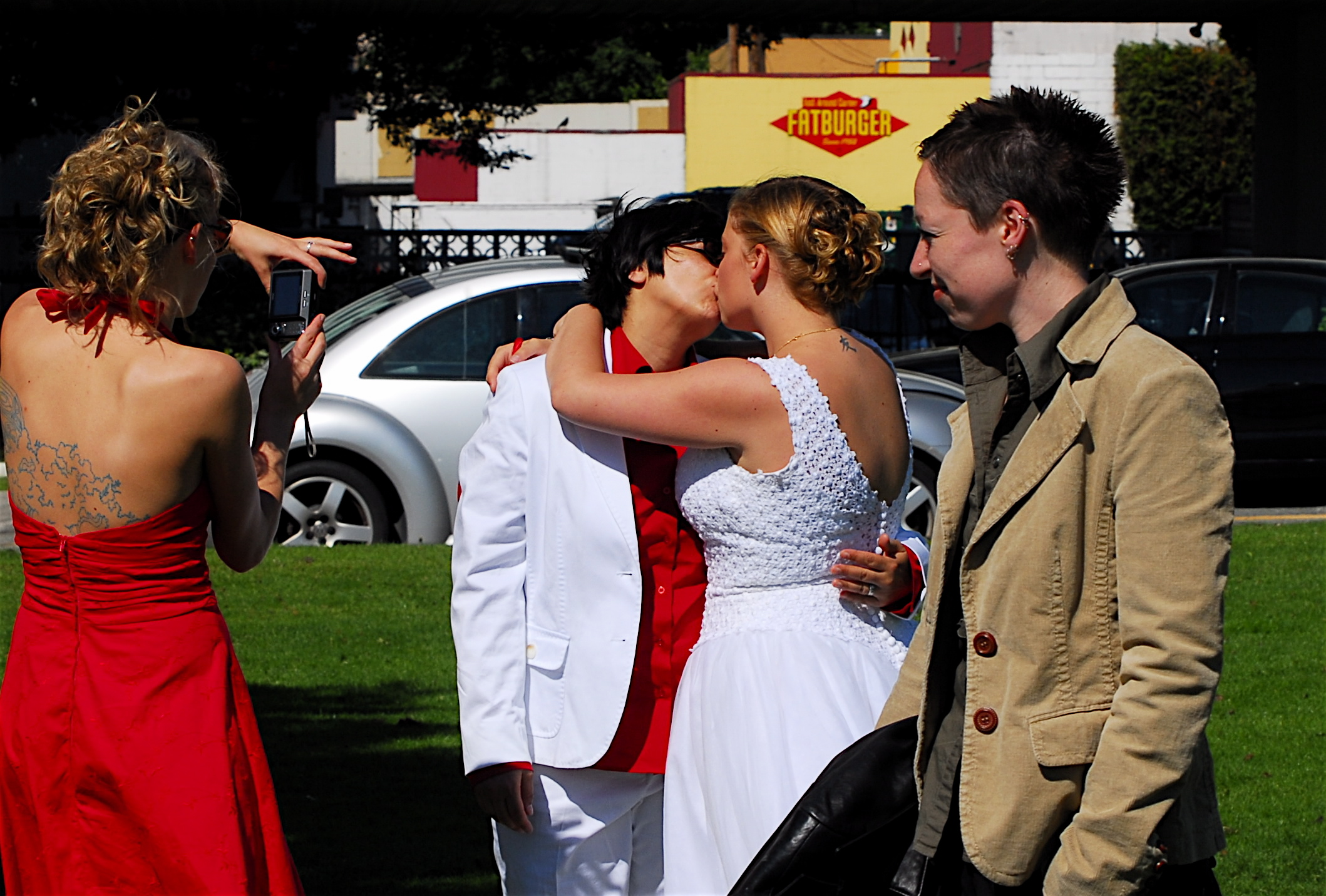
A lesbian wedding near English Bay, July 2007

735 same-sex marriages were performed in British Columbia in 2003. Most were between persons who resided in the United States rather than in Canada. British Columbia has become a popular marriage destination for same-sex couples, and Vancouver was listed in the "Top 10 Gay Wedding Destinations" by Lonely Planet in 2014.

The 2016 Canadian census showed that there were 11,230 same-sex couples living in British Columbia.

== Religious performance ==
Several dioceses of the Anglican Church of Canada allow their clergy to bless and perform same-sex marriages. The Diocese of British Columbia has authorised its clergy to bless same-sex civil marriages since 2013. In autumn 2016, Bishop Logan McMenamie announced at a diocesan synod meeting that he will "move forward with the marriage of same-sex couples in the diocese". Following the passage of a resolution known as "A Word to the Church" by the synod of the Anglican Church of Canada in July 2019, allowing its dioceses to choose whether to perform same-sex marriages, the bishops of the dioceses of New Westminster and Kootenay announced that clergy would be permitted to officiate at same-sex marriages from 1 August 2019. The measures include a freedom of conscience clause for clergy opposed to performing same-sex marriages. Pastoral arrangements are made if a same-sex couple wishes to marry in their home congregation and their priest has decided not to officiate at such marriages. The Territory of the People also allows its clergy to solemnise same-sex marriages. On the other hand, the Diocese of Caledonia, encompassing parts of northern British Columbia, does not perform same-sex marriages. Its marriage canons state that "it shall be the duty of the officiating clergyman to ensure that Canon XXVII on Marriage in the Church enacted by the 23rd Session of the General Synod of the Anglican Church of Canada is followed in its entirety".

Some other religious organisations also perform same-sex marriages in their places of worship, including the United Church of Canada, Quakers, the Evangelical Lutheran Church in Canada, and the Canadian Unitarian Council. In 2021, the Artisan Church left the Canadian Conference of Mennonite Brethren Churches due to the denomination's opposition to same-sex marriage. The congregation in Vancouver had decided to permit same-sex marriages, which proved highly controversial in the Mennonite Brethren denomination.

== Public opinion ==
A June 12 – July 6, 2003 Environics Research poll found a 53%–43% margin nationwide in favour of same-sex marriage. The poll concluded that British Columbia had one of the highest levels of support in the country, but did not give a figure.

A December 14 – January 5, 2005 Environics Research poll found a 54%–43% margin nationwide in favour of same-sex marriage. 214 British Columbians were surveyed in the poll, and 60% of respondents said they were in favour of same-sex marriage, while 38% were opposed.

== See also ==
- Same-sex marriage in Canada
- LGBT rights in Canada
- Smith v Knights of Columbus
