= Christ Church Historic Site =

Historic site in Hope, British Columbia

Coordinates: 49.3808°N 121.4441°W

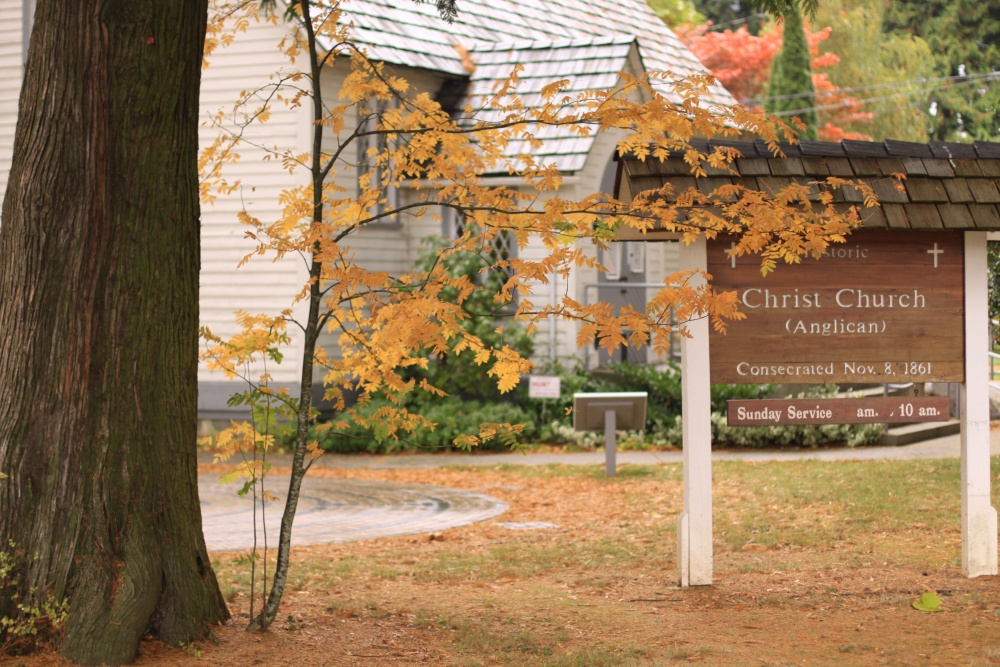
Christ Church Historic Site

The Christ Church National Historic Site in Hope, British Columbia, was consecrated on 8 November 1861 by Bishop George Hills, the colony's first bishop, making it the oldest church on the mainland of British Columbia, and the oldest church in the province still on its original foundation.

Aside from this, it was made a national historic site because "it is representative of the response of the British church and state to the social and political conditions created by the Fraser River and Cariboo gold rushes in colonial British Columbia," and "it is a fine example of Anglican parish church architecture in the Ecclesiological Gothic Revival style".

The church was commissioned by Reverend Alexander David Pringle, a Scottish missionary for the Anglican Communion, and it was run chiefly by missionaries for the first years of its existence. The building's architect was Captain John Marshall Grant of the Royal Engineers, Columbia Detachment, and it was built by the Royal Engineers that were in Hope laying out the town at the time.
