= Christ Church Cathedral (Ottawa) =

Coordinates: 45.417755°N 75.708198°W

Cathedral Church of Christ
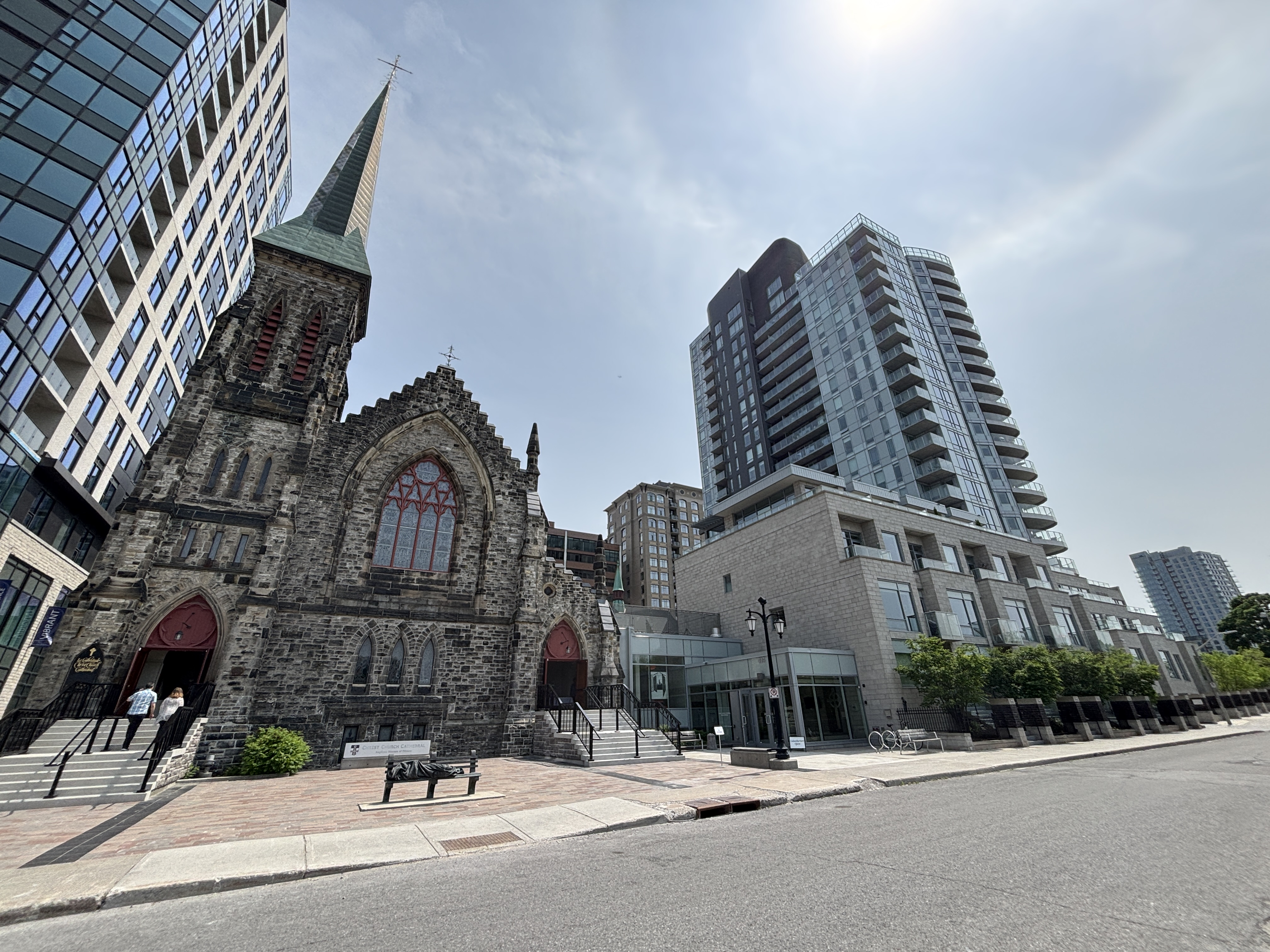
- Christ Church Cathedral Ottawa
- Cathedral Church of Christ
- Denomination: Anglican Church of Canada
- Churchmanship: Broad church
- Website: ottawacathedral.ca

Administration
- Province: Ontario
- Diocese: Ottawa

Clergy
- Bishop: Kathryn Otley
- Vicar: Doug Richards
- Dean: Beth Bretzlaff

The Cathedral Church of Christ is the Anglican cathedral in Ottawa, Ontario, Canada. The church is located at 414 Sparks Street in the northwest section of the city's downtown at the western end of Sparks Street on top of a promontory looking down to the Ottawa River.

== History ==
=== Beginnings ===
Philemon Wright, a native of Woburn, Massachusetts, came to Canada in 1800. Making his way up the Ottawa River, and looking for a satisfactory place to settle, he finally came to the Chaudière Falls, and was pleased with the character of the land on the north side of the river, so he decided to settle there. In later years, the flourishing settlement of Wrightstown would become the village, then later the City of Hull, and finally the City of Gatineau. Following the War of 1812, the Township of March was set aside for retired military officers and men. It was situated further up river on the south side. In 1824, Nicholas Sparks crossed the river from then Hull and carved a home for himself out of the heavy timber on the high cliffs of the south shore. In doing so, he became the first citizen of what would later become Bytown, and much later, the City of Ottawa. Colonel John By and the Royal Engineers arrived two years later to build the Rideau Canal, connecting the Ottawa River with Lake Ontario.

=== Early church ===
In 1824, the Reverend Amos Ansley, a native Canadian and the son of a United Empire Loyalist, arrived in Hull from England. Sent by the Society for the Propagation of the Gospel, his mission included the Township of March, and in later years, Bytown. Services were held in a schoolhouse in Hull, which proved to be very small and inconvenient. Through the generosity of Philemon Wright, a little stone church was built, and opened on the first of October 1826. From his headquarters in Hull, Reverend Ansley served the Church population of fourteen townships bordering on the Ottawa River. By 1827, he was serving eleven preaching stations in Lower Canada (Quebec) and Upper Canada (Ontario), visiting most places by water in bark canoes.

=== Call ===
In 1828, the Bishop of Quebec, the Right Reverend and Honourable Charles James Stewart, paid a visit to Bytown. Later that same year, the Venerable and Honourable John Strachan, an archdeacon and later the first Bishop of Toronto, also visited Bytown. The diaries of both these clergy record the fact that the Presbyterians, Roman Catholics and Methodists of Bytown were able to lay claim to small but significant places of worship to call their own; but those of the faith of the Church of England did not, "...yet (were) sufficient to deserve the attention of a missionary." Archdeacon Strachan and the Lieutenant Governor of Upper Canada paid a visit to the home of Colonel By, situated in what is now called Major's Hill Park. There, they discussed the problems of funding the building of the canal, and need for a place of worship for the large Protestant following in Bytown. Later, on October 6, 1828, Dr. Strachan was able to draw up a subscription list for the proposed church building. It was not until early 1832, after it was announced at a meeting in Bytown that Nicholas Sparks had donated a site for the church. He had already given land for the building of St. Andrew's Presbyterian Church, as well as for the Methodist church. The original church building was to be fifty feet by thirty feet in breadth, the inside wall twenty feet high from the level of the beams to the top of the wall plate, and a tower erected at the west end of the church.

=== Old church ===
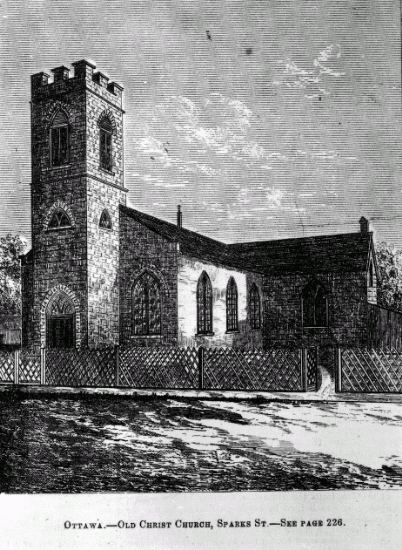
The old Christ Church in 1872

Though formally established in 1832, it was not until 1833 that the congregation was formally organized. The site was donated by Nicholas Sparks in 1832. The first service in Christ Church Bytown took place on July 21, 1833. Due to decreased givings and pledges over the next two years, the parishioners found themselves seated on temporary rough planks for pews, and the walls and ceiling were not completed for a number of years. The church had to be closed during the winter as two stoves were needed for sufficient heating, but only one was available. In spite of appeals, no funds were made available, and it was not until 1835 that the church finally owned its own property. By 1841, due to rapid growth in the population of Bytown, it was recognized that the church was not adequate in providing for the needs of the growing congregation. A proposed enlargement plan was drawn up, and Nicholas Sparks gave the additional land required for the enlargement. On July 12, 1841, the cornerstone was laid. Subscriptions were received from far and wide, and the enlargements were fully completed by October 1843. The church was consecrated and given its name, Christ's Church. Over the next quarter-century, a number of attempts were made to begin the building of a larger church. In 1860, Thomas Fuller designed a central school house for the congregation, which was demolished in 1872. In 1861, Alexander Cowper Hutchinson (architect) designed a stone font inside the chapel, however the church was demolished in 1872. In 1865, a rectory was completed immediately west of the existing church building.

=== New church ===
In January 1872, after many vestry and committee meetings, it was decided that a new church be constructed on the site of the old church. The last service in the old church was held on March 3, 1872, and demolition and reconstruction started immediately. The King McCord Arnoldi (architect) designed the new Christ Church Cathedral in an English Gothic style on the bluffs on Sparks Street near Bay Street, 1872–1873 The cornerstone was laid July 3, 1872 with a time-capsule containing monetary denominations and other artifacts. The building was formally opened September 29, 1873 and the first service took place at 11:00 am that day. The East Window is dedicated to the members of the Sparks Family.

Walter Chesterton (architect) designed a new pulpit in 1880.

Alfred Arthur Cox (architect) designed a new Sunday school and parish hall, 1902–1903.

=== Cathedral ===
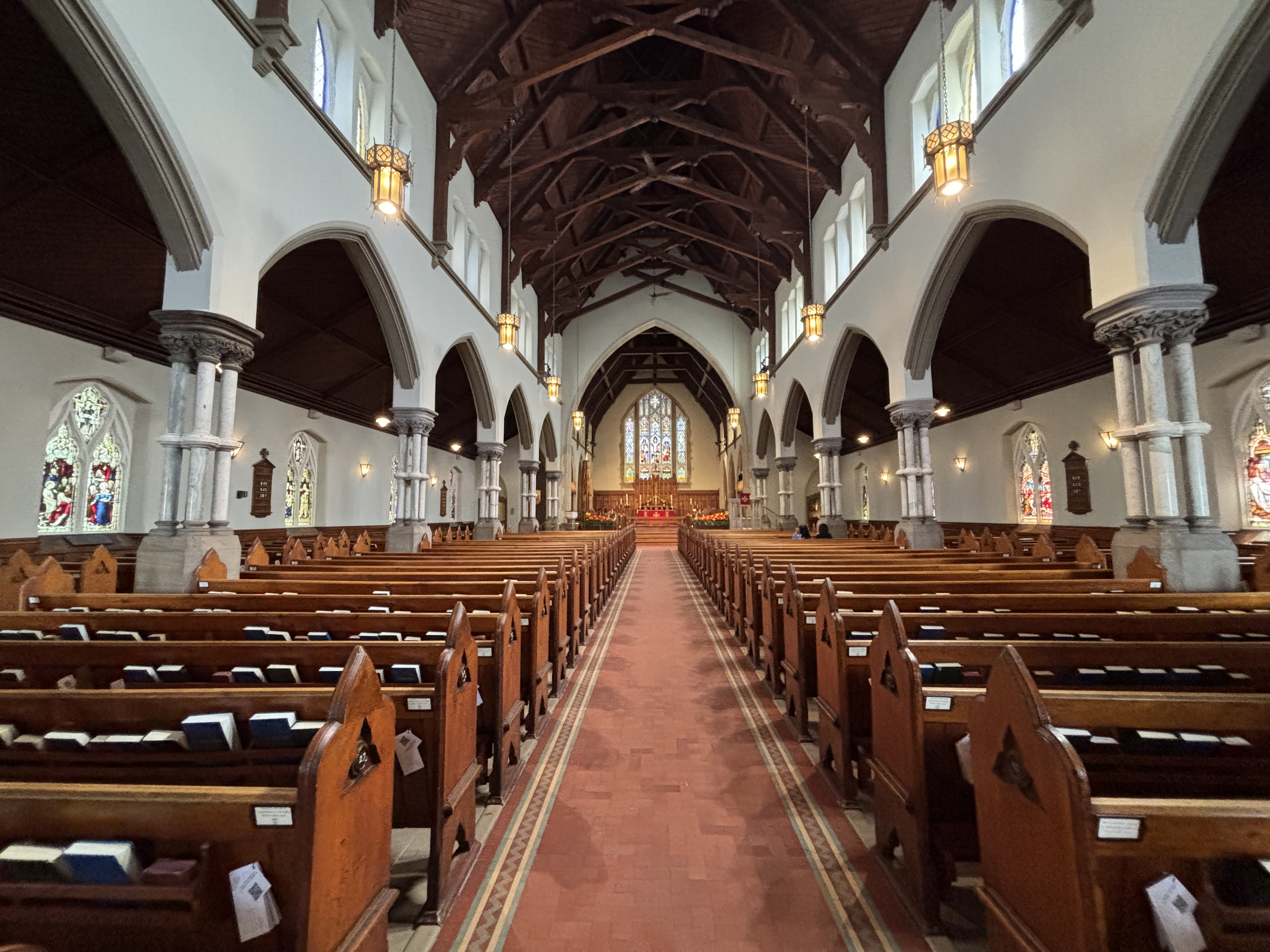
Cathedral interior

In 1896, the Diocese of Ottawa was carved out of the northern part of the Diocese of Ontario. The Right Reverend Charles Hamilton was elected as the first bishop of the new diocese. On Easter Day 1897, it was formally announced that Christ Church would become the cathedral of the new diocese.

A memorial plaque is dedicated to Zachary Richard Edmund Lewis, of the North-West Mounted Police and of "D" Co. 2nd Battery Royal Canadian Regiment who died 18 February, AD 1900 and his father Lewis, Esquire, M.D.

A memorial plaque is dedicated to members of the congregation who died or served during the Great War. Erected by the 77th Overseas Battalion, C.E.F., and unveiled on June 11, 1916, a memorial plaque is dedicated to members of the Battalion who attended service at Christ Church Cathedral.

Memorial plaques are dedicated to Lieutenant Ayton Richey Leggo, Eric Munro Anderson and to Lieutenant Edmund Brown, a chorister in the Cathedral who laid down his life for his friends on the fields of France during the Great War.

Erected by the Governor General's Foot Guards, a memorial 1916 Regimental Colour of the 77th Battalion (Ottawa), CEF is dedicated to the 77th Battalion (Ottawa), CEF.

In November 1931, a special meeting of Vestry unanimously agreed to begin the construction of a new chancel, extended to the street line of Queen Street to mark its 50th anniversary in 1932. An enlarged chancel was designed by A.J. Hazelgrove and the building contract was given to John Ferguson. The work of tearing down the old chancel began immediately after Easter 1932, and on December 22, 1932, a thanksgiving Eucharist was celebrated in the new largely expanded chancel. The completion of the new chancel marked 100 years since the establishment of the first church in Bytown.

A memorial Queens Colour, 1874 Regimental Colour, and description text erected by members of the Regiment, was unveiled on 21 May 1933, and is dedicated to the Governor General's Foot Guards.

Erected by the Christ Cathedral, a memorial Sanctuary lamp and the lights in the chancel are dedicated to members of the Cathedral who died in WWII.

Erected by the Governor General's Foot Guards and unveiled on 4 October 1959, a memorial King's Colour and plaque at Christ Church Cathedral is dedicated to the Governor General's Foot Guards. Erected by members of the Regiment, a memorial Queens Colour, Regimental Colour, and text was unveiled on 31 August 1969, and is dedicated to the 1st Battalion, The Canadian Guards. This Colour was presented by Governor General Vincent Massey, on 5 October 1957.

The Reredos was carved by the Rowley Family.

== Stained glass ==
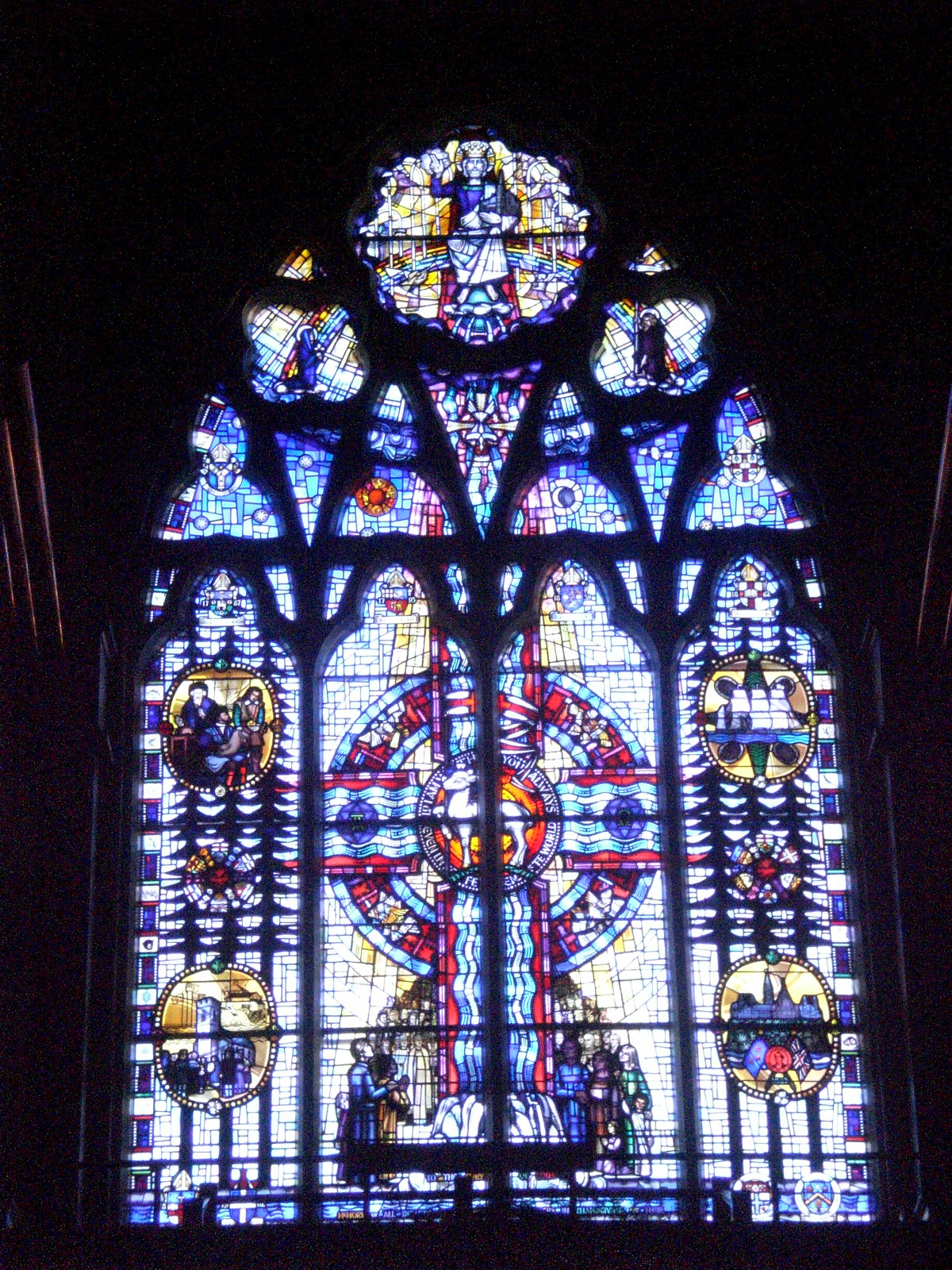
North side window

A stained glass memorial window "I am alive forevermore" is dedicated to Major Robert Donaldson, Late HM 41st The Welsh Regiment and family members. Major Donaldson had died in December 1864.

A stained-glass Memorial West Window, designed and installed by Christopher Wallis in 1982 depicts the cathedral's history, early French and English explorers in Bytown, and an ANIK-B satellite. The cathedral is regularly included amongst other architecturally interesting and historically significant buildings in Doors Open Ottawa, held annually in June.

== Present ==
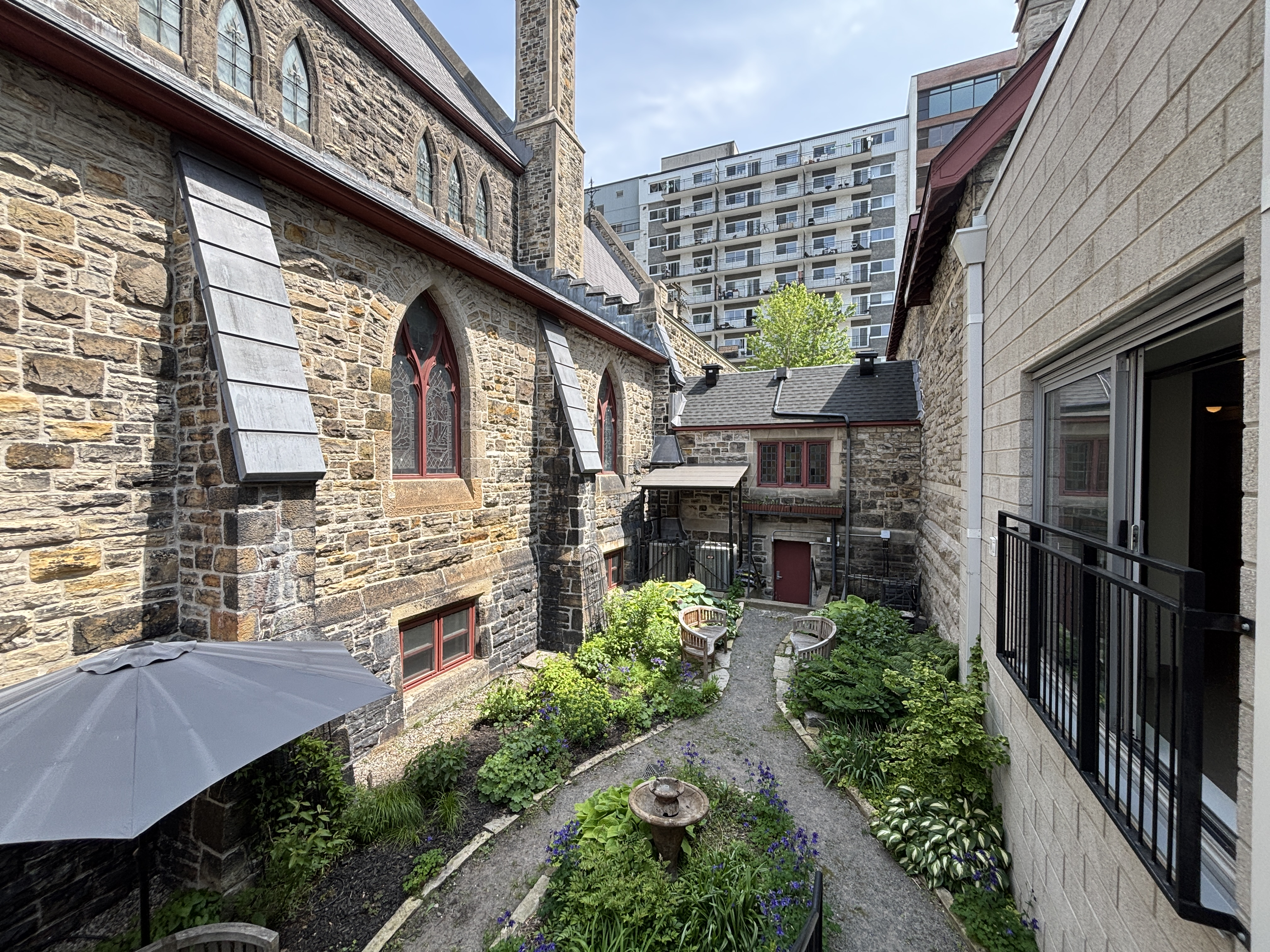
Courtyard of the church

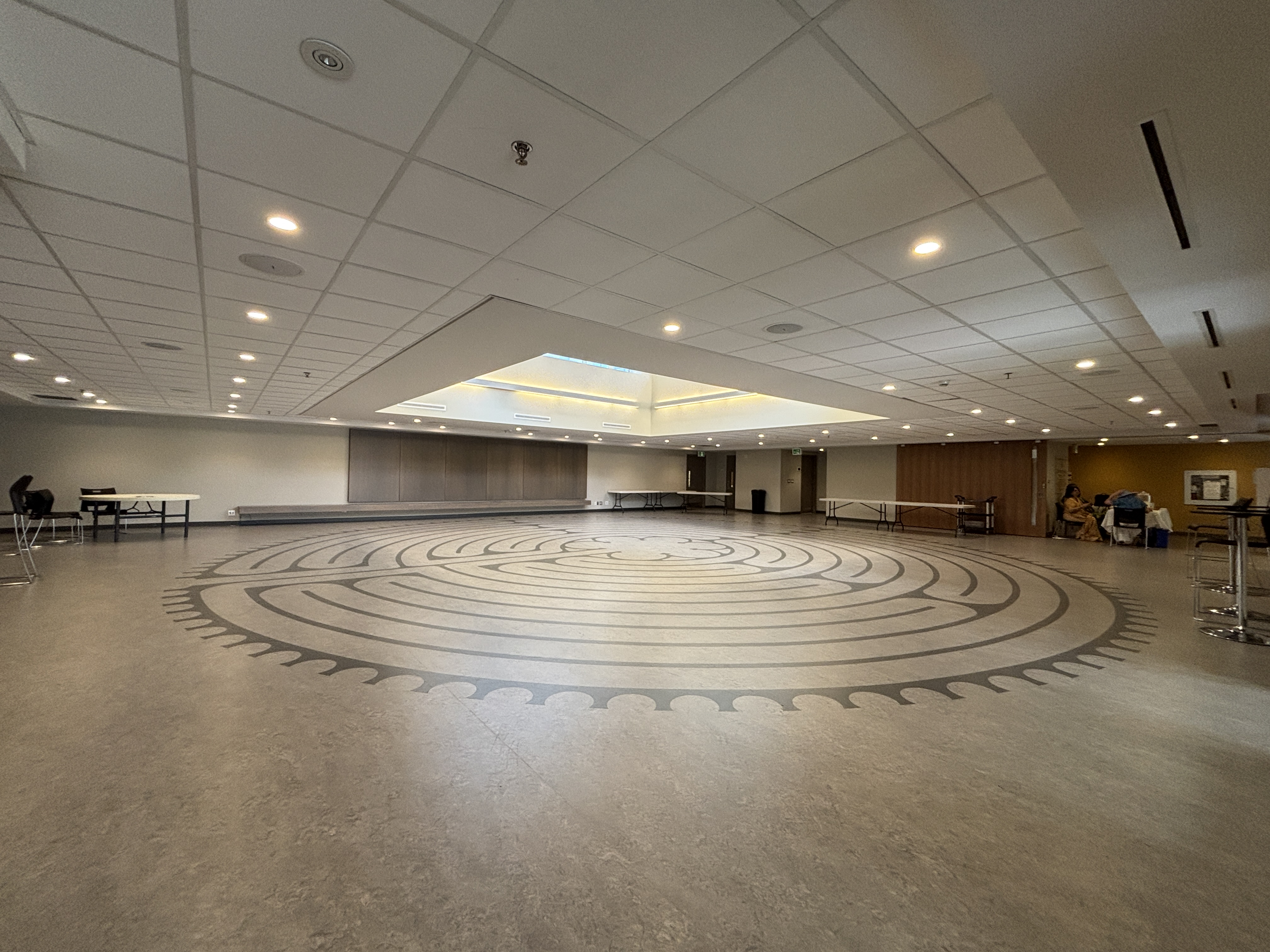
The Great Hall

Currently, the Right Reverend Kathryn Otley serves as the Bishop of Ottawa. The Very Reverend Elizabeth J. Bretzlaff serves as the Dean of Ottawa and the Rector of Christ Church Cathedral. The Reverend Canon Douglas Richards serves as the Vicar, and the Reverend Canon Hilary Murray serves as the Canon Pastor. Christ Church Cathedral is a diverse parish with a wide range of ministries. It is a place where faith is nurtured in creative, traditional and thought-provoking ways. The cathedral is frequently the site of diocesan, ecumenical, interfaith and state events, including the state funerals of Prime Ministers John Diefenbaker and Lester B. Pearson, Governors-General Ray Hnatyshyn, Vincent Massey, and Roland Michener, and the Canadian funeral services of Queen Elizabeth The Queen Mother, Prince Philip, Duke of Edinburgh, and Elizabeth II, Queen of Canada.

Since the 1970s the cathedral has also been that of the Anglican Military Ordinariate of Canada and a seat in the Sanctuary is that of the Anglican Bishop Ordinary to the Canadian Forces. A plaque with those who have served in this capacity is above it. The present Bishop Ordinary is the Right Reverend Nigel Shaw.

=== Music ===
The Cathedral Choir of Men and Boys is the only remaining all-male choir in a Canadian Anglican cathedral. They continue to set a high standard of vocal repertoire and musicality, visiting the UK and France in recent years, and serving as the resident choir at Ely, Salisbury, Edinburgh, and St. Paul's cathedrals, and have just concluded a residency at Gloucester Cathedral, and Westminster Abbey. The choir has sung to acclaim in the United States on several occasions, most recently singing in St. Thomas' Church in New York City, and in Washington National Cathedral. The choir currently is made up of 24 boys, aged from 8 to 15, and 14 professional men.

The Cathedral Girls' Choir is, likewise, the only ensemble of its kind in a Canadian Anglican cathedral. In addition to its liturgical duties at home and participation in important civic and national events, the Choir has toured widely since its founding in 2002 including two European tours (2012 and 2016) and numerous visits to the United States (2010 and 2014). Its 25 members come from across Canada's Capital Region and range in age from 8 to 18.

In 2018, the cathedral added a third group in its choir complement: a mixed-voice adult ensemble.

The Choirs share the singing of the principal weekly liturgies including Choral Eucharist on Sundays at 10:30, Evensong on Sundays at 4:30 and at major feast days.

Throughout its history, the cathedral has been served by a number of eminent church musicians including Godfrey Hewitt, Frances Macdonnell and Matthew Larkin.

James Calkin is the director of music and organist and director of the Cathedral Girls' Choir. Andrew McAnerney is the associate director and principal conductor of the Choir of Men and Boys. Nick Veltmeyer serves as music associate.

=== Organs ===
In 2009, the cathedral purchased a Rodgers Trillium 958 as their primary organ, due to ongoing concerns about the effectiveness and disrepair of the Warren/Casavant organ (1891/1932/1948/1967/1995). Although there was controversy in the choice of a digital instrument, the organ is very versatile and tonally varied. In 2014, the "en chamade" trumpet stop (Casavant 1997) was restored to use, and an antiphonal division added. While the long-range plan of the cathedral has been to raise funds for a new pipe instrument in the future, the digital organ has proven to be a robust, effective instrument, capable of supporting a wide variety of recital and choral literature. As well, the Cathedral owns a 4-stop portative instrument (Karl Wilhelm, 1972).

== Dean of Ottawa ==
The Dean of Ottawa is also Rector of Christ Church. An incomplete list of deans includes:

- c1900: John Strutt Lauder 1st Dean of Ottawa
- 1932–1938: Edgar Frank Salmon
- 1945–1953: Howard Hewlett Clark (afterwards Bishop of Edmonton 1953–59)
- 1954–1962: John Ogle Anderson (Bishop of British Columbia, 1968)
- 1962–1970: Frederick Gartrell (afterwards Bishop of British Columbia 1970)
- 1970–1983: Thomas Edward Downey
- 1984–1985: John Baycroft (afterwards Bishop of Ottawa)
- 1985-1990: Walter Asbil (afterwards Bishop of Niagara)
- 1990–1999: Peter Coffin (afterwards Bishop of Ottawa and Bishop Ordinary to the Canadian Armed Forces)
- 1999–2020: Shane A.D. Parker (afterwards Bishop of Ottawa)
- 2020–present: Elizabeth J. Bretzlaff

== See also ==
- List of designated heritage properties in Ottawa
