= William Perrin (bishop) =

Anglican bishop (1848–1934)

- Bishop of Willesden
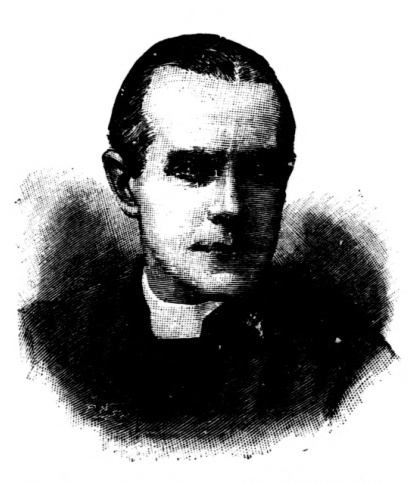
- Diocese: Diocese of London
- In office: 1911–1929 (ret.)
- Successor: Vernon Smith
- Other posts: Bishop of British Columbia (1893–1911); Rector of St Andrew Undershaft (1912–1934); Assistant Bishop of London (1929–1934)

Orders
- Ordination: 1870
- Consecration: 1893 by Edward White Benson (Canterbury)

Personal details
- Born: 11 August 1848 Westbury-on-Trym, Somerset, UK
- Died: 27 June 1934 (aged 85)
- Denomination: Anglican
- Education: King's College London

William Willcox Perrin (11 August 1848 – 27 June 1934) was an Anglican bishop in the late 19th and early 20th centuries.

Perrin was born at Westbury-on-Trym, Somersetshire, on 11 August 1848 and educated at both King's College London and Trinity College, Oxford. Ordained in 1870, he began his ministry with a curacy at St Mary's Southampton and was then vicar of St Luke's in the same city before his ordination to the episcopate as the Bishop of British Columbia. He was consecrated a bishop on 24 March 1893, by Edward White Benson, Archbishop of Canterbury, at Westminster Abbey. He was later translated to be the Bishop of Willesden. During this period he was also the rector of St Andrew Undershaft A noted Freemason (he kept the rectory until his death). He died on 27 June 1934 and is buried in the churchyard of St John-at-Hampstead Church, London. His sister Edith was a prominent social reformer.

Perrin unveiled and dedicated the Hampstead War Memorial in May 1922.

He retired in summer 1929, resigning his see in time for his successor's consecration on the Feast of St James (25 July). He became an Assistant Bishop of London until his death — he apparently retained oversight of Hampstead deanery throughout.

Church of England titles
| Preceded by George Hills | Bishop of British Columbia; 1893–1911 | Succeeded by Charles Roper |
| New title | Bishop of Willesden; 1911–1934 | Succeeded by Vernon Smith |
