= Barry Jenks =

Canadian bishop (1937–2018)

Raymond Barry Jenks (1937 – July 11, 2018) was an Anglican bishop who served as the eleventh Bishop of British Columbia from 1992 to 2002.

Jenks was educated at the Anglican Theological College British Columbia and ordained in 1965. Following a curacy at St John the Evangelist, North Vancouver he held incumbencies in Sechelt, Departure Bay, Lantzville and Victoria before his appointment to the episcopate.

Jenks died on July 11, 2018, at the age of 80–81.

Anglican Communion titles
Preceded by Ron Shepherd	Bishop of British Columbia; 1992–2002	Succeeded by James Cowan
