= Frank Salmon (priest) =

Canadian priest (1884–1979)

Edgar Frank Salmon, D.D. (1884-1979) was Dean of Ottawa from 1932

Salmon was educated at the Church Missionary Society College, Islington. He was ordained in 1908 and began his career at Elmvale, Ontario. After that he served at Cookstown and Galetta. He came to Christ Church Cathedral, Ottawa in 1921 serving as a curate until 1926, and then as its rector until 1932 and then as dean until 1938. He was then the Rector of Holy Trinity, Philadelphia from 1938 to 1951.
