= Anna Greenwood-Lee =

Canadian Anglican bishop

The Right Reverend Anna Greenwood-Lee
- Bishop of British Columbia
- Church: Anglican Church of Canada
- Diocese: British Columbia
- In office: 2021–present
- Predecessor: Logan McMenamie

Orders
- Ordination: 2000 (diaconate); 2001 (priesthood)
- Consecration: January 30, 2021 by Melissa M. Skelton

Personal details
- Born: 1974 or 1975 (age 50–51)

Anna Greenwood-Lee is a Canadian Anglican bishop. Elected in 2020 and consecrated in 2021, she is the 14th diocesan bishop of the Diocese of British Columbia in the Anglican Church of Canada.

== Life ==
Greenwood-Lee is a native of Edmonton. She received a B.A. in religious studies from Mount Allison University, an M.Div. from Episcopal Divinity School and an MBA from the Athabasca University. She is married to James Greenwood-Lee, and they have two teenage children. Ordained a priest in 2001, Greenwood-Lee spent early appointments in the dioceses of Calgary and Toronto. In 2006, she returned to Calgary as rector of St. Laurence Anglican Church, which was in decline prior to her 15-year tenure.

Greenwood-Lee was one of the so-called "Rogue 6", a group of Calgary clergy censured by Bishop Greg Kerr-Wilson for violating their ordination vows by disobeying their bishop by participating in "an irregular (same-gender) marriage ceremony".

Greenwood-Lee was elected Bishop of British Columbia at a virtual synod in October 2020 and consecrated and installed at Christ Church Cathedral in January 2021.

== Notes ==
Anglican Communion titles
Preceded by Logan McMenamie	Bishop of British Columbia; 2021–present	Incumbent
