= Hywel Jones =

Canadian cleric

Hywel James Jones (4 March 1918 – 23 April 2003) was the 9th Anglican Bishop of British Columbia, elected in 1980, and serving until 1984.

== Life ==
=== Early life and career ===
Jones was born in Porthcawl, Wales, and came to Canada as a boy. He graduated from the College of Emmanuel and St. Chad, a member of the Saskatoon Theological Union group of Protestant theological colleges within the University of Saskatchewan, and ordained in 1942.

After a curacy in Tofield, Alberta he was a travelling priest in the Diocese of Edmonton until 1944. He then moved to the Diocese of British Columbia and was the incumbent at Parksville-Qualicum from 1944 to 1947, of Colwood–Langford from 1947 to 1954, and of Oak Bay from 1954 to 1979. He was also Archdeacon of Quatsino from 1969 to 1971 and of Victoria from 1971 to 1976.

Jones was awarded an honorary Doctor of Divinity by his alma mater in 1980.

=== Personal life ===
Jones' wife, Margaret, died in 1985. They had a daughter and a son, and six grandchildren.

Anglican Communion titles
Preceded by Frederick Gartrell	Bishop of British Columbia; 1980–1984	Succeeded by Ron Shepherd
