= Christ Church Cathedral (Victoria, British Columbia) =

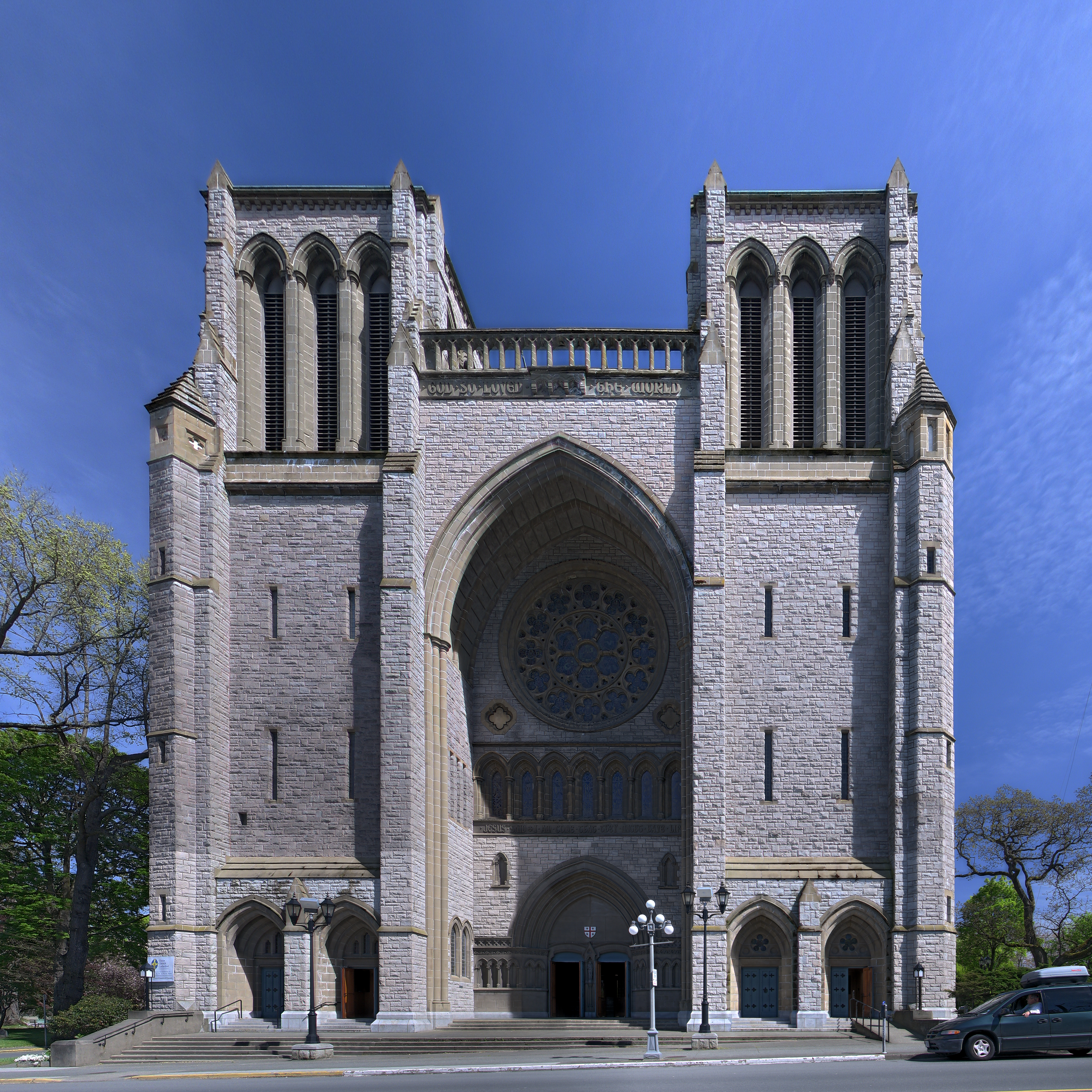
- Christ Church Cathedral
- Christ Church Cathedral
- 48°25′20″N 123°21′33″W
- Location: 930 Burdett Avenue; Victoria, British Columbia; V8V 3G8
- Denomination: Anglican Church of Canada
- Website: http://www.christchurchcathedral.bc.ca/

Administration
- Province: British Columbia and Yukon
- Diocese: British Columbia
- Deanery: Tolmie

Clergy
- Bishop: Anna Greenwood-Lee
- Dean: Ansley Tucker

Christ Church Cathedral in Victoria, British Columbia is the cathedral church of the Diocese of British Columbia of the Anglican Church of Canada.

== History ==
=== First church (1856–1869) ===
The Hudson's Bay Company hired Robert John Staines, graduate of Trinity College, Cambridge, to teach the children of Fort Victoria, and offered him a further stipend to take Holy Orders and serve as chaplain to the fort as well. He arrived at the fort with his wife Emma and servants in 1849, none too impressed with the rustic conditions at this remote trading post. For their part, the small fort community became increasingly dissatisfied with his teaching skills and manner, such that he was discharged in 1854. He in turn set off for London to grieve the Company's land policies at the Colonial Office on behalf of fellow settlers.

Staines had held Anglican services in the mess room of Fort Victoria and aboard visiting ships pending completion of a church. The Company appointed Edward Cridge, a college friend of Staines, as his replacement. Cridge and his new wife Mary arrived from England on April 1, 1855, via the new Panama Canal Railway. The 1855 census of Victoria reported "232 non-native persons". The company church, designed and supervised by J. D. Pemberton, Colonial Surveyor, was finally ready for use on August 31, 1856 and was initially known as the Victoria District Church.

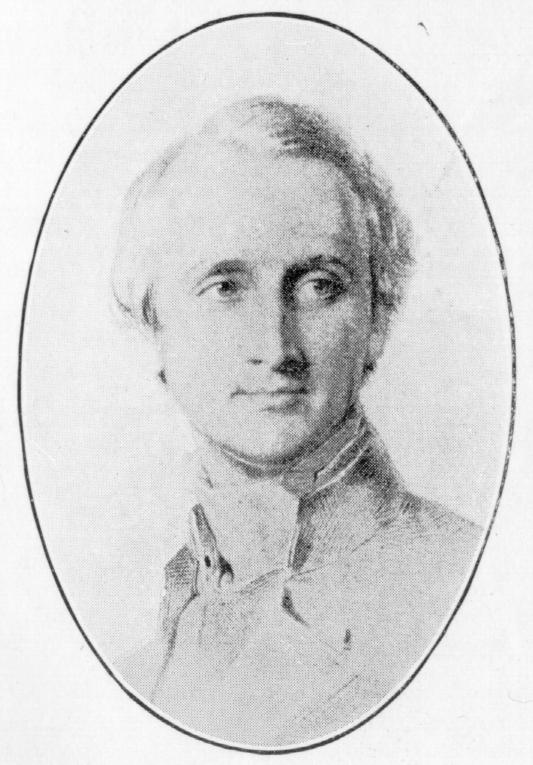
George Hills was consecrated as the first Bishop of British Columbia in 1859.

Beginning in 1858, Victoria was overrun with gold seekers on their way to the Fraser Canyon Gold Rush. Hundreds of makeshift structures went up and several years of intense growth ensued. December 12, 1859, Queen Victoria issued Royal Letters Patent creating the Bishopric of British Columbia. On January 12, 1859, Letters Patent created the Diocese of British Columbia, endowed by The Baroness Burdett-Coutts. On February 24, 1859, George Hills was consecrated in Westminster Abbey as its first Bishop. After a summer of fundraising for the Columbia Mission Fund, Hills sailed for Victoria and arrived on January 6, 1860. Hills had engaged the clipper barque Athelstan to bring from England a pre-fabricated church building and furnishings, which arrived in February. It was erected on Block R, Douglas St., about half a mile north of Christ Church, and was consecrated as the Church of St John the Divine, after his parish in Yarmouth.

The Town of Victoria was incorporated in 1862 with 6000 people and 1500 buildings. Vancouver Island reverted from the Hudson's Bay Company to the Crown, and Fort Victoria was demolished. Hills had to choose which of the two churches to make the cathedral. St John's could hold 600. Christ Church had been built with a capacity of 400, but an apse and south aisle were added to it in 1862 and a north aisle in 1865. On December 7, 1865, opting for the better location of Christ Church, he consecrated Christ Church Cathedral and appointed Cridge as its first dean.

On the night of September 30, 1869, the cathedral burned to the ground. The communion vessels and organ were rescued and the vestry books survived. The parish used a vacant Presbyterian church for several years while they rebuilt.

=== Second church (1872–1929) ===
The cornerstone for the new building was laid on May 20, 1872 by Lieutenant-Governor Joseph Trutch. It was to be another wooden structure as conditions were not ripe for a stone building. It was about 100 ft (30 m) by 50 ft (15 m) with a tower of 78 ft (24 m) Construction took a little over six months.

==== Schism of 1874 ====
As a low churchman, Cridge had little use for church hierarchy and authority; not for obedience to his bishop, and certainly not for formal liturgies. Things simmered privately between Cridge and Hills until evensong on December 5, 1872, the day of services for the consecration of the new cathedral, when guest preacher William S. Reece, Archdeacon of Vancouver (i.e. Vancouver Island), gave what Cridge interpreted as a rousing endorsement of ritualism. Rather than announcing the following hymn, Cridge hotly took issue with the homily, in breach of canon law which prohibited public disagreement among clergy. Hills then had to take official notice of the situation, trying first censure, the most lenient course. Cridge remained defiant. The citizens and newspapers of Victoria took sides.

Hills then tried Cridge in ecclesiastical court. The trial was held in the vacant Presbyterian church, was open to the public and received attentive press coverage. On September 22, 1874, Cridge was found guilty of 16 of 18 charges laid, and his licence was revoked. Cridge disregarded the revocation and demanded that the case be heard in "an unbiased secular court."

Hills then sought an injunction against Cridge in the Supreme Court of British Columbia sub nomine Bishop of Columbia v. Cridge. It fell to their mutual friend Supreme Court Chief Justice Matthew Baillie Begbie to adjudicate. He encouraged them to settle out of court. Cridge did apologise for his outburst at evensong, but would not recognise the authority of the Bishop. In his judgment of October 24, 1874, granting an injunction forbidding Cridge to act as a priest of the diocese, Chief Justice Begbie observed,

His [Hills'] reluctance to use his power may however, obviously be imputed to motives of the most christian forbearance … But if the defendant had been at once in December, 1872, excluded from the pulpit of Christ Church until due submission, I should not now have had the most painful duty of attending to this distressing case, and probably much correspondence of a most disagreeable nature would have been avoided.

Begbie had been a member of the cathedral parish and was on the building committee for the new cathedral, but after rendering this verdict, he transferred his membership to St. John the Divine.

Much of the Cathedral's congregation, among them some of Victoria's major figures such as Sir James Douglas and Dr. J.S. Helmcken, met with Cridge a few days later and voted to form a new congregation, the Church of Our Lord, under the auspices of the Reformed Episcopal Church, which had recently broken from the Episcopal Church of the United States. Even so, the Columbia Mission Report was able to state that givings at Christ Church in 1875 were similar to those in 1871. Cridge's new congregation met at the vacant Presbyterian church until their building was completed at the end of 1875.

=== Present church (1929–present) ===
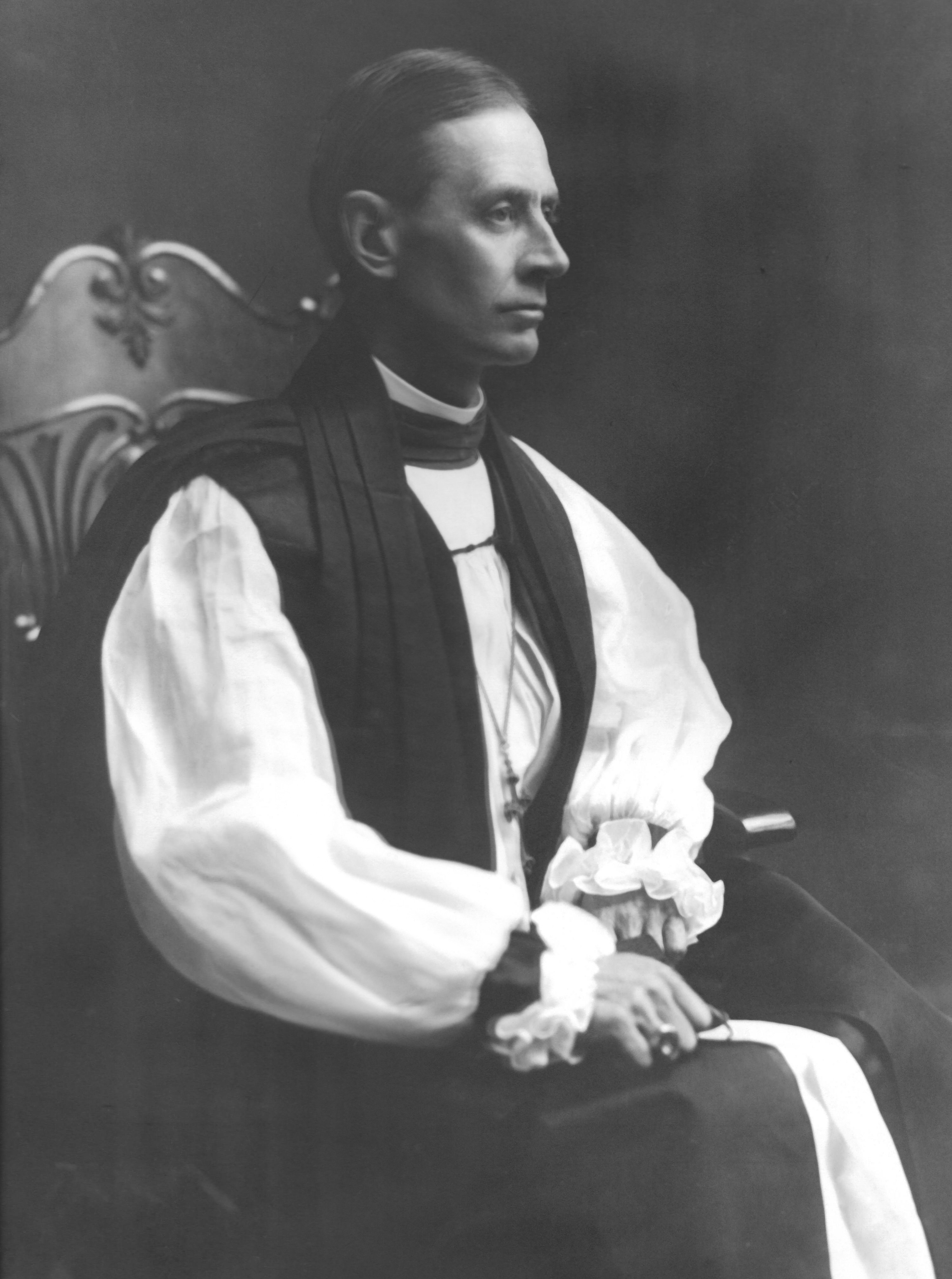
Charles Schofield oversaw the construction of the present church, as the Bishop of British Columbia.

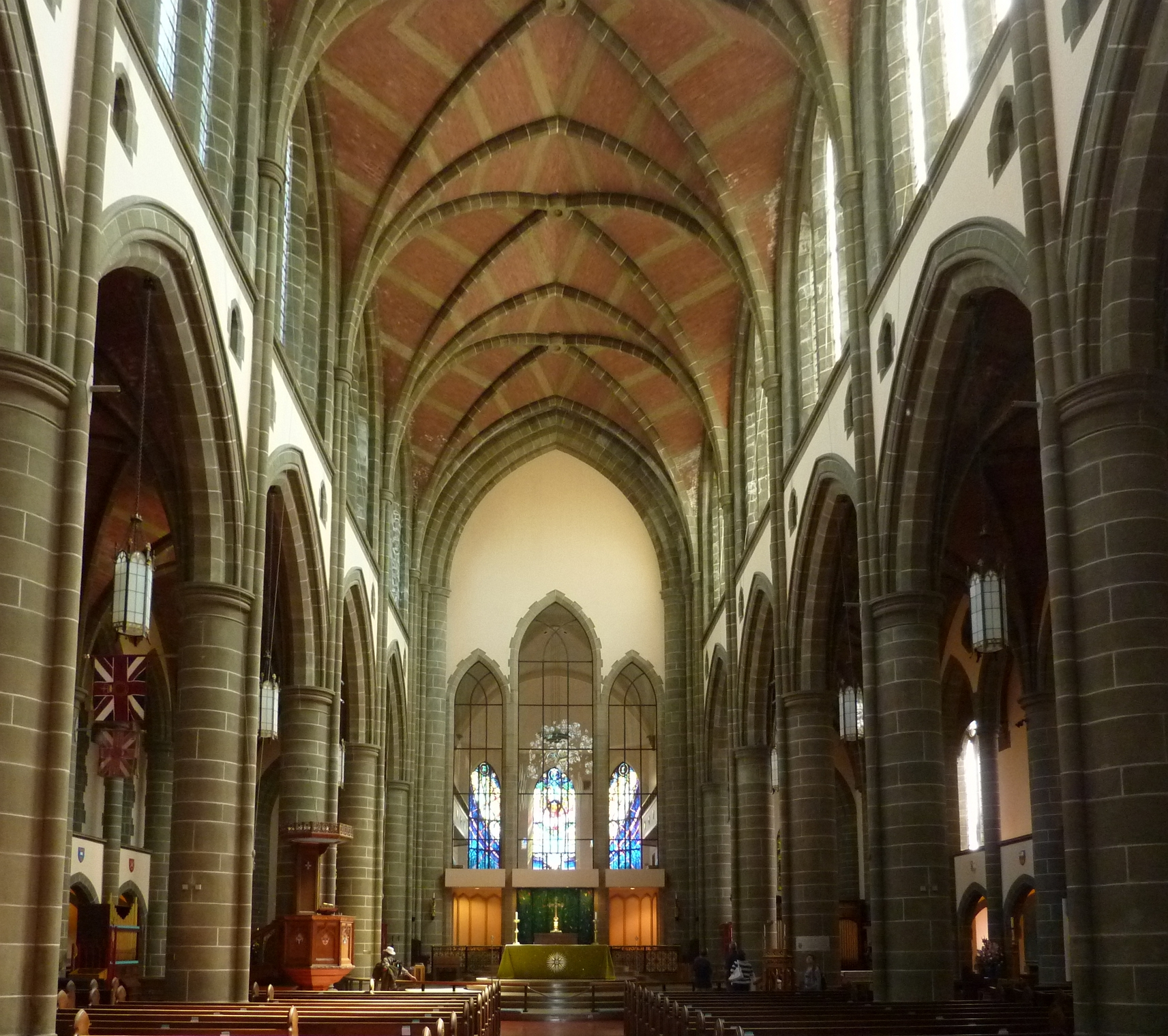
The nave

The wooden structure built in 1872 became inadequate for the size of the congregation. In 1891, an international design competition for a larger and more enduring edifice was held. In January 1893, architect J.C.M. Keith of Victoria was announced as the winner. He designed a 13th century Gothic style building with a spire. The congregation made a good start on a building fund, but it was not adequate to begin construction. Efforts were discontinued until 1920. By then, Keith had altered his original design to include two west towers and a central lantern tower, but the latter was never built.

Charles Schofield, elected bishop in 1916, had the judgement, tact, courage, perseverance and business sense to lead the project. He had recently overseen the rebuilding of Christ Church Cathedral, Fredericton, which was ignited by lightning in 1911 during his tenure there as Dean. In 1919, a new Cathedral Buildings Campaign for $250,000 was authorized.

==== Construction ====
Schofield had Memorial Hall built first; its cornerstone was laid on October 1, 1923. A service for breaking ground on the new Cathedral took place on May 20, 1926. Fortunately, Mr. Keith was still available to supervise the project. The cornerstone was laid on September 9, 1926 by Arthur Winnington-Ingram, the Bishop of London.

Funds were just sufficient to construct the nave, narthex and the lower portions of the northwest and southwest towers only. Vaulting was of brick rather than stone, and was flattened by two feet to reduce costs. The organ from the previous building was rebuilt on top of temporary vestries in the south-east corner of the nave. The east end of the nave was closed with a temporary wooden wall, and this much was consecrated on September 28, 1929. Winston Churchill visited the site several weeks earlier, on September 9, 1929, and was quick to help when the superintendent asked him to lay a stone on the north tower.

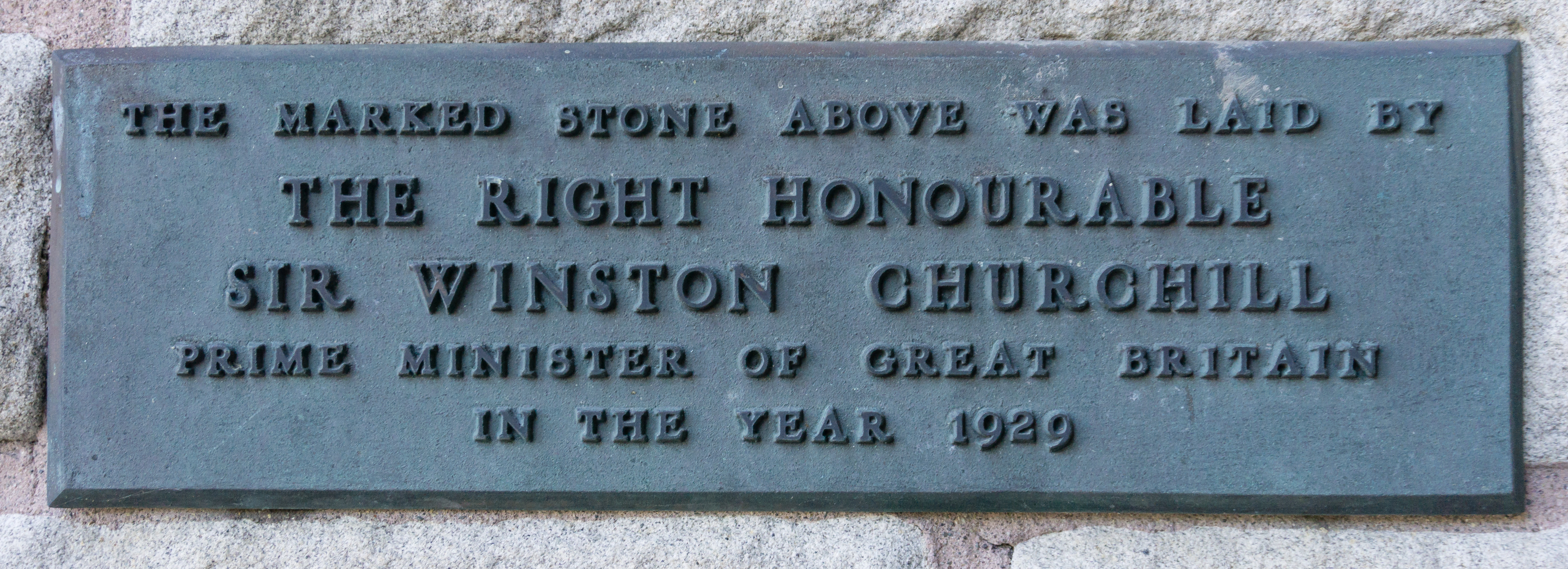
In September 1929, Winston Churchill laid a stone for the church's north tower.

During construction, a robin nested atop scaffolding next to the top of one of the main pillars of the nave. Work in that area was deferred until the end of nesting season. R. W. Marsh, who was responsible for production of the many cast stone elements of the interior pillars and arches, suggested that a sculpture of the robin on its nest be placed atop the pillar, and offered to cast one in stone, given a model. Reginald Dove, the architect's assistant, sculpted the bird and nest in clay, and a stone casting of his model was made and installed on the capital of the pillar.

In 1933, thanks to an anonymous donation of £5000, a contract was let to continue the north-west tower as far as the bell chamber floor. In 1936, through the generosity of two donors, Mrs. Mozley and Mrs. Matson, a peal of eight bells for change ringing was purchased and installed atop this floor. The bells were made by Mears & Stainbank of Whitechapel, London and were shipped via the Panama Canal. They are of the same design as the peal at Westminster Abbey. The eight tons of steel girders and seven and a half tons of bells were hoisted the seventy feet onto the tower and installed by Yarrows Shipyard of Victoria under the direction of Edward W. Izard in just six working days. As the tower was incomplete, a wooden shed was built over the bells to protect them from the elements. The bells were first rung on July 12, 1936.

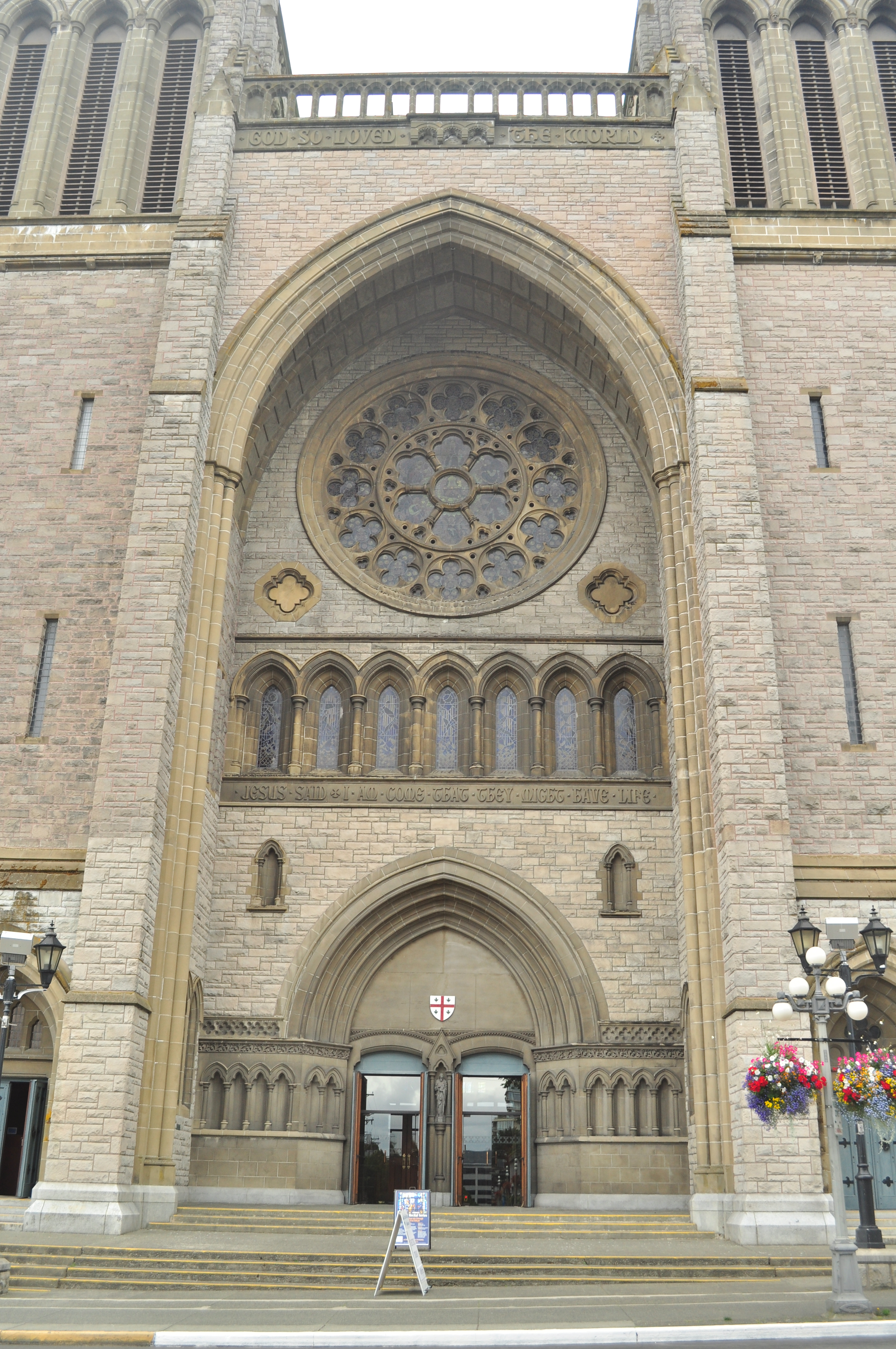
The installation of concrete and stone facings on the western towers and arch over the cathedral's rose window was completed in 1952.

In 1952, a columbarium was constructed under the nave. In 1957, the western towers and the arch over the rose window were completed in concrete with stone facing. To reduce costs, the 20 foot lantern band at the top of each tower was omitted. Skilled stone cutters were in short supply, so workers from Europe were brought to the quarry on Texada Island, where they produced and shipped finished stones. In 1958, a proposal to rebuild the main organ for $40,000 was approved.

==== Renovations since completion ====
The high altar which had been brought from the second cathedral was moved to the Lady Chapel. A new free-standing altar was put on a raised platform with the choir behind, and fronted by a semi-circular altar rail. A large hexagonal corona lighting fixture was suspended over the altar to draw attention there. A portable classroom was attached to the rear of the building as choir practice room and vestry. Fairbridge Farms Society offered their Harrison and Harrison organ, which was installed in the west gallery in 1975. The small Bevington organ which had been there was moved to the main floor and put on casters.

In 1980, a decision was taken to rebuild the main organ yet again, and to relocate it to an engineered shelf over the west gallery. The Harrison and Harrison organ was moved from the gallery to where the main organ had been. Several years later, two smaller bells were added to the peal of eight. They were dedicated on March 8, 1983 in the presence of Elizabeth II and Prince Philip, Duke of Edinburgh before being hung in the tower. The Treble is dedicated to the memory of Mr. Izard, who led the ringing in the tower for nearly forty years, and the Second to the Queen's grandson Prince William, Duke of Cambridge.

The temporary wooden east wall had become unsound. In 1985, completion of the design with central tower was abandoned, and a design for a worthy completion in the spirit of the original was adopted, a stone-clad addition containing a chapel, vestries, chapter room, and wash rooms. It was expected that the addition might exist with simple sheet metal cladding for many years before stone cladding could be afforded, but several unexpected large bequests came along, which allowed the project to be completed immediately, and removed all construction debt. The exterior was, however, finished not on stone, but in concrete masonry and EIFS. Birds of the precinct have found EIFS to be an ideal substrate for nest cavity construction.

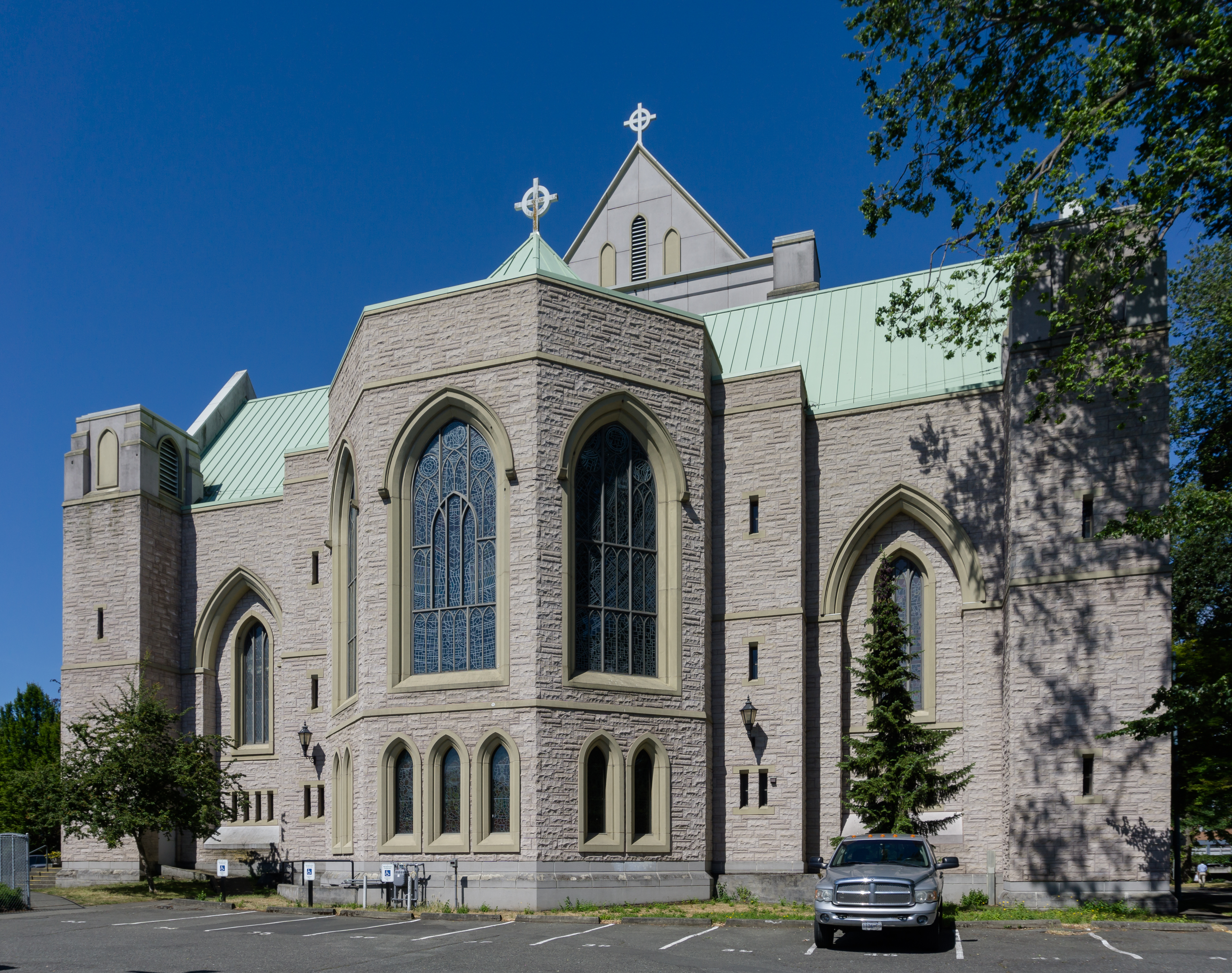
Eastern wall of the cathedral. The concrete and EIFS wall replaced a temporary wooden wall in the late 20th century.

In 1988, the corona over the altar was removed. In 1994, the columbarium was enlarged. In 1997, bonding and ballasting of the brick vaulting was undertaken as a seismic upgrade. It was to have been parged when constructed, but this was done only on the aisle vaulting.

In 2000, a contract for a new four-manual mechanical action pipe organ was signed with Hellmuth Wolff & Associés of Laval QC. Site preparation began in 2002 with removal of the old organ and the shelf on which it stood. It had been thought at the time of signing that the project would have to proceed in several phases due to fund-raising constraints, but by the time that site preparation had begun, pledges for the whole amount were in hand, so the contract was re-negotiated as a single project. This entailed rescheduling to 2004, as the builder had since signed other contracts which he had to fulfil first. The organ was completed in September 2005.

In June 2019, the Cathedral became a partner in the Community of Cross of Nails (CCN) founded by Coventry Cathedral after the destruction of it and the city by bombing in the Second World War. In Christ Church, the former baptistry was re-dedicated as the Chapel of Reconciliation and Cross of Nails by John Witcombe, Dean of Coventry, who presented the Cathedral with a Cross of Nails which was mounted on the wall below the carved words "Creator Forgive." An explanatory marble plaque was also mounted on the wall.

== Deans of Columbia ==
The Dean of Columbia is also Rector of Christ Church Cathedral, Victoria. Past and current Deans of Columbia include:

- 1860–1874: Edward Cridge (1st Dean, left church after ecclesiastical trial)
- 1876: Sam Gilson
- 1878–1881: George Mason
- 1881–1892: Duties performed by Bishop
- 1910–1914: Alexander Doull (Bishop of Kootenay, 1915)
- 1915–1916: Charles Schofield (afterwards Bishop of British Columbia, 1916)
- 1917–1937: Cecil S. Quainton
- c.1945: Spenser Elliot
- 1949–1952: George Calvert (afterwards Anglican Bishop of Calgary, 1952)
- 1952–1955: Philip Beattie (afterwards Bishop of Kootenay, 1955)
- 1955–1980: Brian William Whitlow, MA Trinity College, Dublin
- 1981–1995: John Timothy Frame
- 1996–2005: John Wright
- 2006–2015: Logan McMenamie (afterwards Bishop of British Columbia, 2014)
- July 2015–2022: Margaret Ansley Tucker
- September 2024–present: Jonathan Thomas

== Organists ==
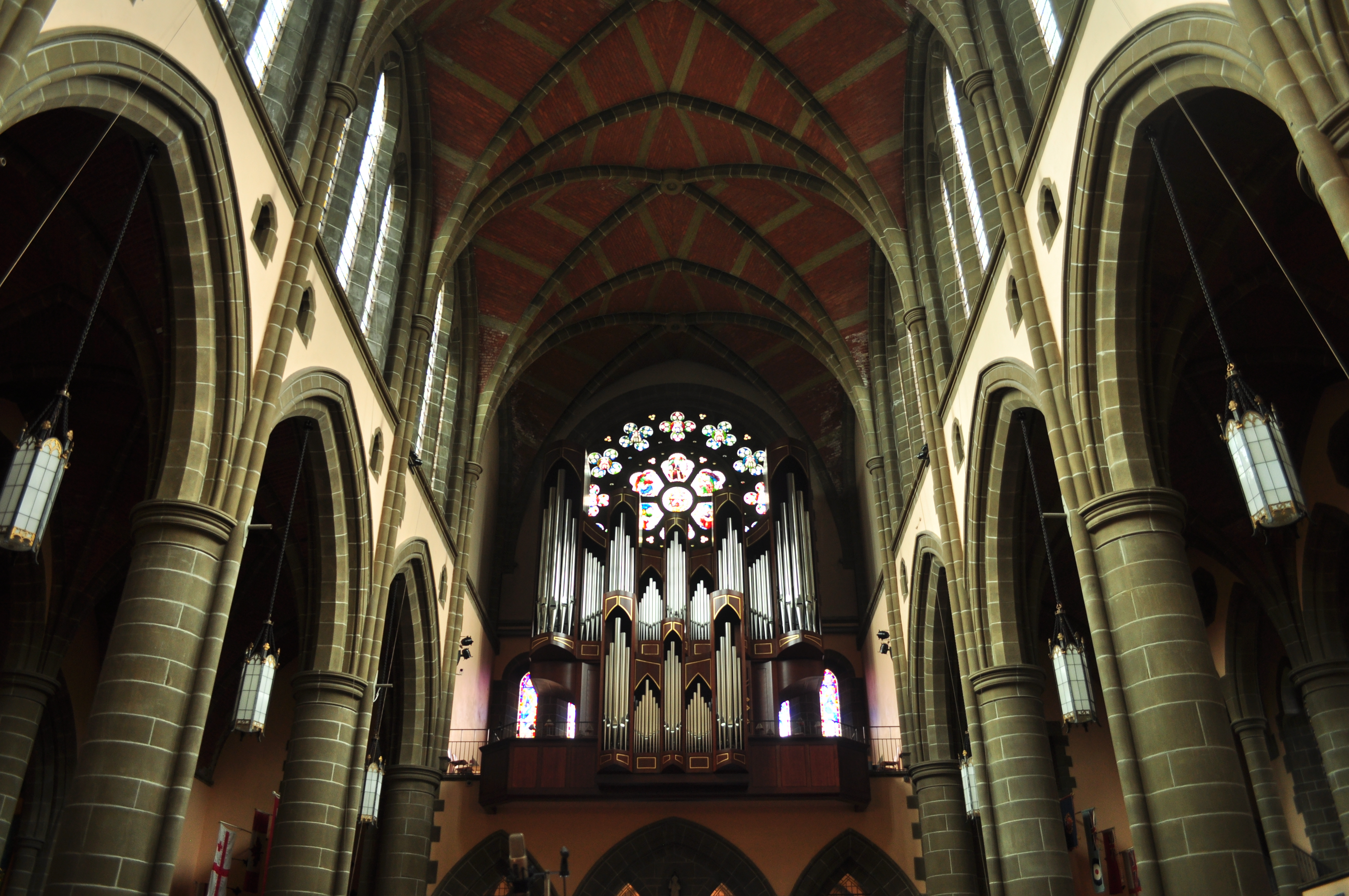
The cathedral's pipe organ

Past pipe organists at the cathedral include:

- Stanley Bulley
- Graham Percy Steed, B.Mus Durham University, Fellow of the Royal College of Organists
- Richard Proudman, M.A. Cambridge University
- Beal Thomas, M.M.
- Canon Michael Gormley
- Donald Hunt, MMus (McGill), FRCO, ARCCO (Organ Scholar, St. Paul's Cathedral, London (2010–2011), Assistant Organist, St. Mary's Cathedral, Edinburgh (2012–2017)
