= It Happened at the Cathedral =

"It Happened at the Cathedral" is an illustrated volume of selected letters of Bishop R. F. Shepherd, dating from 1948 to 2012. It chronicles his experiences over several decades, serving as an Anglican rector, dean, and bishop in various parts of Canada, and also as a "Snowbird" rector in the States during the 1990s at Borrego Springs, California.

The book was compiled and published autonomously by Shepherd's daughter, Mary. The autobiography-in-letters features her father's official letters, personal letters, and poetry, and each entry is complemented by Mary's visual artwork, in the form of collages, portraits, and photographs.
