= Ron Shepherd (bishop) =

Canadian Anglican bishop

Ronald Francis Shepherd (15 July 1926 – 12 October 2012) was the tenth Anglican Bishop of British Columbia, serving from 1984 to 1991.

Shepherd was educated at the University of British Columbia and trained for the priesthood at King's College London and ordained in 1953. Following a curacy at St Stephen's, Rochester Row he was Rector of St Paul's, Glanford, Ontario and then All Saints, Winnipeg. He was Dean of Edmonton from 1967, and then, from 1969, Dean of Montreal before his election to the episcopate in 1984.

Shepherd's daughter, Mary Shepherd, published an illustrated volume of his letters, entitled “It Happened at the Cathedral.” The book includes his personal letters, his sermons, as well as poetry, all accompanied by her collages and portraits.

Anglican Communion titles
Preceded by Hywel Jones	Bishop of British Columbia; 1984–1991	Succeeded by Barry Jenks
