= John Lauder (priest) =

John Strutt Lauder (1829–1900) was Dean of Ottawa from 1897 until his death.

Lauder was educated at Trinity College, Toronto and ordained in 1854. After a curacy at St. Catharines he held incumbencies at Carleton Place and Merrickville. In 1856 he married Henrietta Lyon of Richmond, Ontario. He was Archdeacon of Ottawa from 1874 to 1897.
