= Ed Downey =

Thomas Edward Downey (1918-2005) was Dean of Ottawa from 1970 to 1983.

Downey was educated at Trinity College, Toronto. He was ordained in 1946 and began his career at Aultsville. After that he served at Navan, Manotick, Westboro and St. Catharines. He was also Domestic Chaplain to the Bishop of Niagara from 1967 to 1970.
