= Mount McGuire (Cascade Range) =

Mountain in the country of Canada

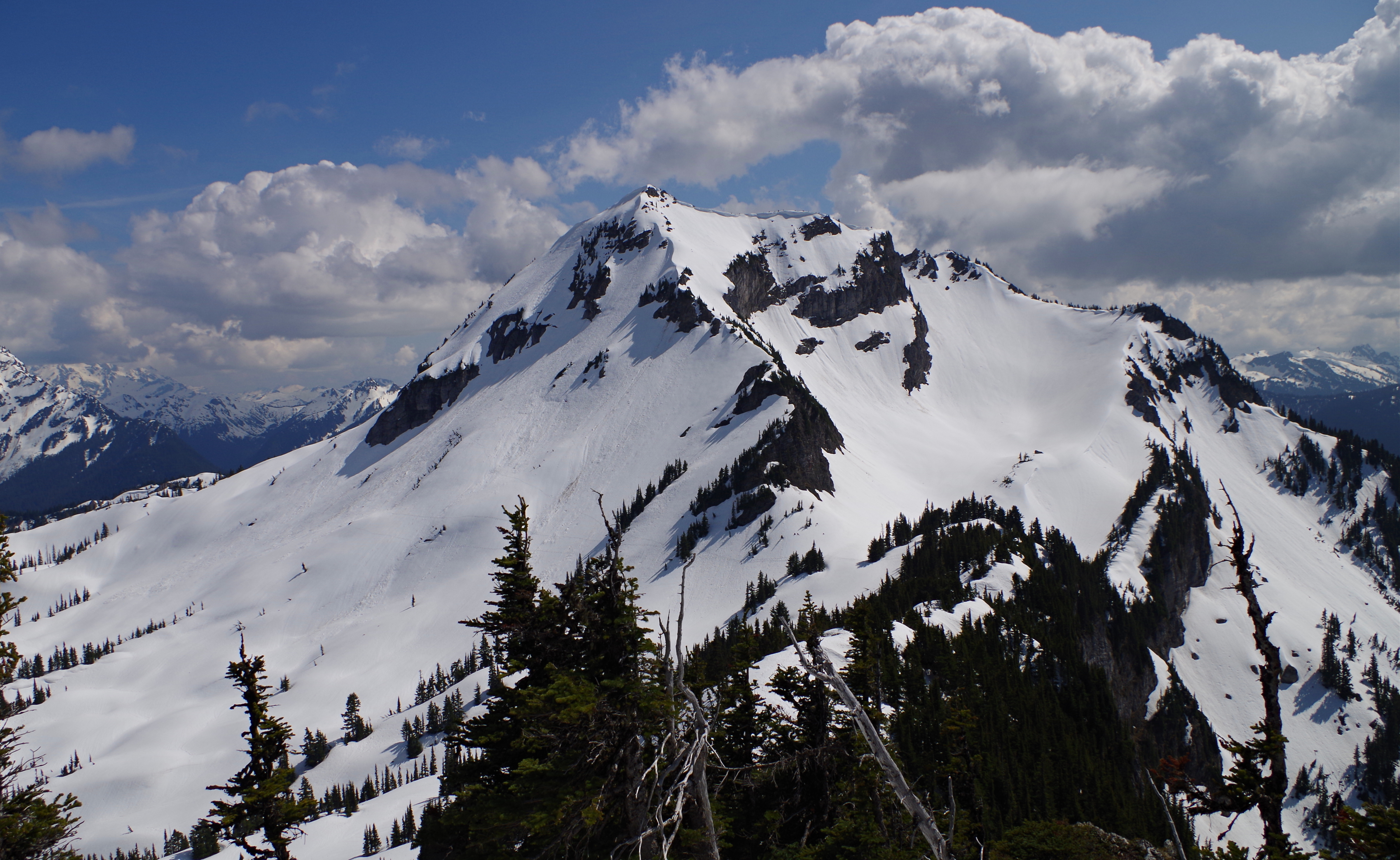
- Mt. McGuire, north aspect

Highest point
- Elevation: 2,008 m (6,588 ft)
- Prominence: 465 m (1,526 ft)
- Parent peak: Canadian Border Peak
- Listing: Mountains of British Columbia
- Coordinates: 49°02′01″N 121°46′23″W

Geography
- Location within British Columbia Location within Canada
- Interactive map of Mount McGuire
- Location: British Columbia, Canada
- District: Yale Division Yale Land District
- Parent range: Skagit Range; North Cascades
- Topo map: NTS 92H4 Chilliwack

Geology
- Rock type: Intrusive
- Volcanic belt: Pemberton Volcanic Belt

Climbing
- First ascent: 1906 by James J. McArthur
- Easiest route: Scramble

Mount McGuire is a 2,008-metre (6,588-foot) mountain summit located in the Cascade Mountains of southwestern British Columbia, Canada. It is situated 4 km (2 mi) north of the Canada–United States border, 19 km (12 mi) southeast of Chilliwack, and 7.4 km (5 mi) northwest of Canadian Border Peak, which is its nearest higher peak. Precipitation runoff from the peak drains into tributaries of the Chilliwack River. The steep western slope of the peak plunges 1800 metres into Tamihi Creek. The mountain was originally known as Tamihi, a Halkomelem name that means "deformed baby finishes." Such infants were sometimes left exposed on the mountain to die. The mountain's name was labelled on 1917 map as McGuire, and officially adopted on October 6, 1936, by the Geographical Names Board of Canada. The peak was first climbed in 1906 by James J. McArthur and survey party via the Southeast Ridge.

== Geology ==
Mount McGuire is related to the Chilliwack batholith, which intruded the region 26 to 29 million years ago after the major orogenic episodes in the region. This is part of the Pemberton Volcanic Belt, an eroded volcanic belt that formed as a result of subduction of the Farallon Plate starting 29 million years ago.

During the Pleistocene period dating back over two million years ago, glaciation advancing and retreating repeatedly scoured the landscape leaving deposits of rock debris. The U-shaped cross section of the river valleys is a result of recent glaciation. Uplift and faulting in combination with glaciation have been the dominant processes which have created the tall peaks and deep valleys of the North Cascades area.

The North Cascades features some of the most rugged topography in the Cascade Range with craggy peaks and ridges, deep glacial valleys, and granite spires. Geological events occurring many years ago created the diverse topography and drastic elevation changes over the Cascade Range leading to various climate differences which lead to vegetation variety defining the ecoregions in this area.

== Climate ==
Based on the Köppen climate classification, Mount McGuire is located in the marine west coast climate zone of western North America. Most weather fronts originate in the Pacific Ocean, and travel east toward the Cascade Range where they are forced upward by the range (Orographic lift), causing them to drop their moisture in the form of rain or snowfall. As a result, the Cascade Mountains experience high precipitation, especially during the winter months in the form of snowfall. Temperatures can drop below −20 °C with wind chill factors below −30 °C. The months July through September offer the most favorable weather for climbing McGuire.

== Climbing Routes ==
Established rock climbing routes on Mount McGuire:

- Southeast Ridge - class 2 First Ascent 1906
- Northeast Ridge - class 2
- North Ridge- class 3
- Northwest Ridge/North Face - class 4-5
- South Face - class 5

== Gallery ==
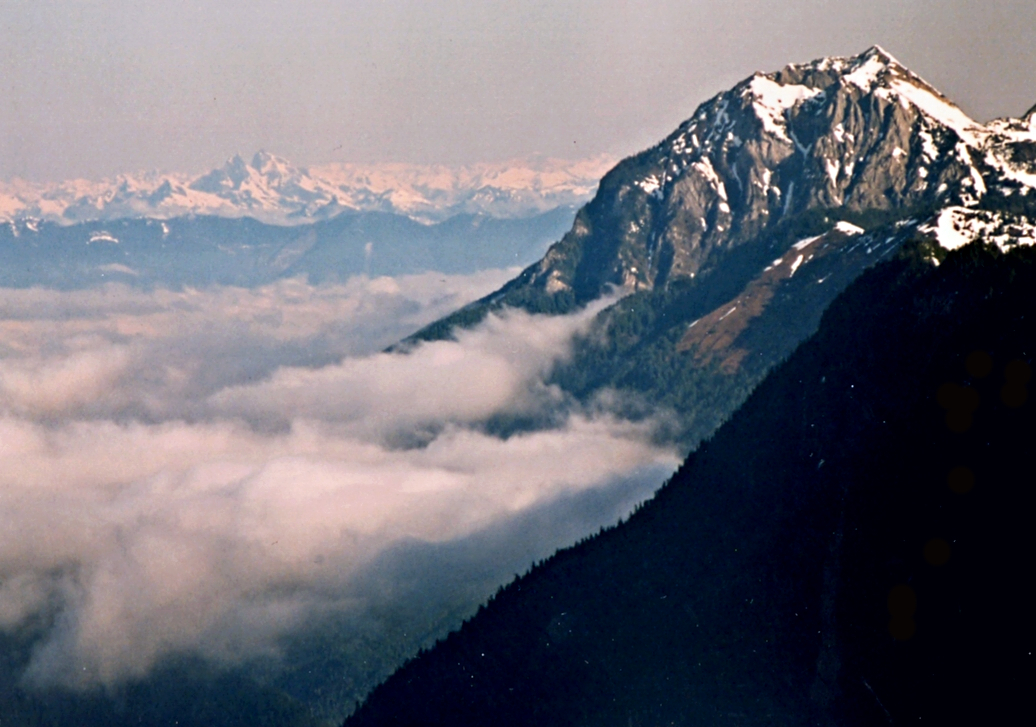
Mount McGuire's south aspect

== See also ==
- Geography of the North Cascades
- Geology of British Columbia
