= Frederick Gartrell =

Canadian Anglican bishop

Frederick Roy Gartrell (1914–1987) was an Anglican bishop in the 20th century.

He was educated at McMaster University and ordained in 1939. After a curacy at St James the Apostle, Montreal, he was Rector of St George's Winnipeg then Archdeacon of the area. From 1962 to 1970 he was Dean of Ottawa, before his elevation to the episcopate as the eighth Bishop of British Columbia.

Anglican Communion titles
Preceded by John Anderson	Bishop of British Columbia; 1971–1979	Succeeded by Hywel Jones
