= Logan McMenamie =

Canadian Anglican bishop

The Right Reverend Logan McMenamie
- 13th Bishop of British Columbia
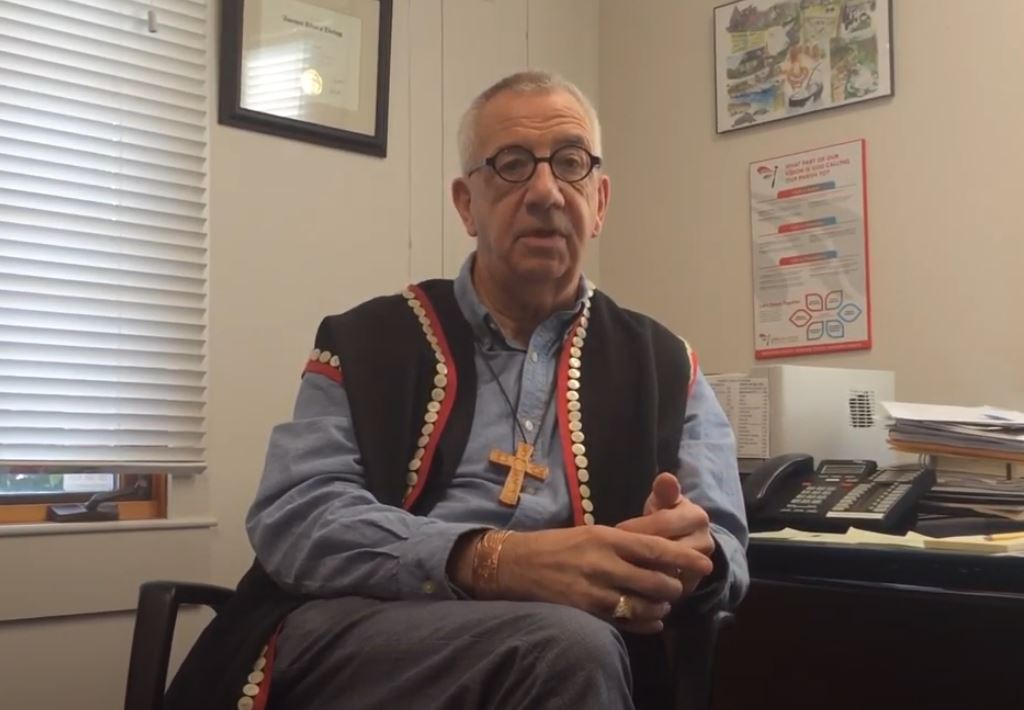
- Church: Anglican Church of Canada
- Province: British Columbia and Yukon
- Diocese: British Columbia
- Elected: December 7, 2013
- Installed: March 2, 2014
- Term ended: Resigned Sunday January 5, 2020. Effective May 1, 2020
- Predecessor: James Cowan
- Successor: Anna Greenwood-Lee

Orders
- Ordination: 1986 by Bp Ronald Shephard
- Consecration: March 2, 2014

Personal details
- Education: Vancouver School of Theology

Logan McMenamie was the 13th Bishop of British Columbia in the Anglican Church of Canada. He was elected on December 7, 2013, and was consecrated and enthroned on March 2, 2014. McMenamie previously served as Dean of Columbia and Rector of Christ Church Cathedral, Victoria, from 2006 to 2014 and as Archdeacon of Juan de Fuca from 1997 to 2006.

Anglican Communion titles
Preceded by John Wright	Dean of Columbia; 2006–2015	Succeeded by Margaret Ansley Tucker
Preceded by James Cowan	Bishop of British Columbia; 2014–2020	Succeeded by Anna Greenwood-Lee
