= John Anderson (bishop of British Columbia) =

Canadian Anglian bishop

John Ogle Anderson (1912–1969) was an Anglican bishop in the mid 20th century.

Anderson was born in Manitoba and educated at St. John's College, Winnipeg. Ordained in 1937, after curacies at St Anne's, Wandsworth and All Saints' Winnipeg he was a chaplain during World War II with the Canadian Grenadier Guards and then rector of St Aidan's Winnipeg from 1946 to 1949. He was Dean of Rupert's Land (Winnipeg) (1949-1954) and then of Ottawa (1954-1962) before his ordination to the episcopate as Bishop of Red River, a suffragan bishop of Rupert's Land. In 1967, he was translated to British Columbia but died the following year.

Anglican Communion titles
Preceded by Harold Sexton	Bishop of British Columbia; 1967–1969	Succeeded by Frederick Gartrell
