= James Cowan (bishop) =

Canadian Anglican bishop (born 1951)

The Right Reverend James Cowan
- Bishop of British Columbia
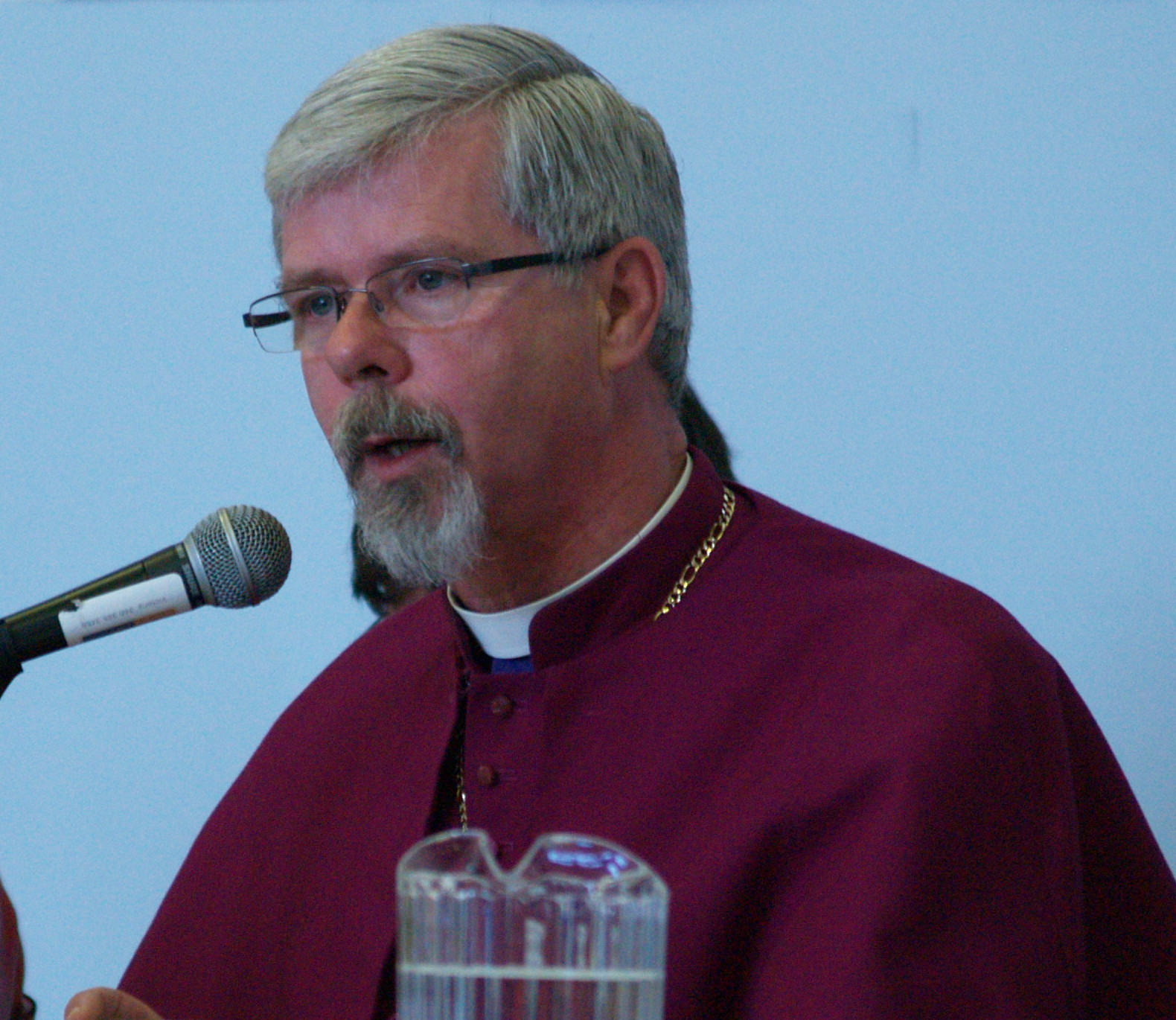
- Bishop Cowan in 2010
- Church: Anglican Church of Canada
- Province: British Columbia and Yukon
- Diocese: British Columbia
- Elected: October 18, 2003
- Installed: 2004
- Term ended: 2013
- Predecessor: Barry Jenks
- Successor: Logan McMenamie

Orders
- Ordination: 1976 by Frederick Jackson
- Consecration: 2004 by David Crawley

Personal details
- Born: 1951 (age 74–75) Saskatoon, Saskatchewan
- Denomination: Christian/Anglican
- Education: University of Saskatchewan Nashotah House Theological Seminary, Nashotah, Wisconsin

James Cowan (born 1951) was the twelfth Anglican Bishop of British Columbia, serving from 2004 to 2013.

Cowan was educated at the University of Saskatchewan and ordained in 1977. He worked in the Diocese of Qu’Appelle for 20 years before coming to British Columbia to be its Diocesan Executive Officer, a post he held until his appointment to the episcopate.

Anglican Communion titles
Preceded by Barry Jenks	Bishop of British Columbia; 2004–2012	Succeeded by Logan McMenamie
