= Smith v Knights of Columbus =

Smith v Knights of Columbus was a Canadian human rights case which upheld the right of a Christian group to ban celebrations of same sex marriages in their rental facility. The case was decided by the British Columbia Human Rights Tribunal on November 29, 2005 and is cited as 2005 BCHRT 544.

== Background ==
Tracy Smith and Deborah Chymyshyn, two lesbians, intended on renting a hall from a male Catholic organization called the Knights of Columbus. After being banned from renting the hall, the couple filed a complaint with the B.C. Humans Rights Tribunal alleging they had been discriminated against according to s. 8 of the Human Rights Code. The complainants argued that while churches may have the right to ban same sex marriages, they should not also have the right to ban celebrations of same sex marriages in property that they own.

The respondents to the complaint argued they have a bona fide reason to discriminate because they are practicing Catholics firmly opposed to same sex marriage. They also argue that s. 2(a) of the Canadian Charter of Rights and Freedoms (the section dealing with religious freedom in Canada) gives them the right to practice their religion free from discrimination.

== Decision of the Tribunal ==
All the issues boiled downed down to a single question: Having found that the Catholic organization (by its own admission) discriminated, was the discrimination an appropriate standard for the purpose or goal that is rationally connected to the function of the Catholic organization?

The first thing the tribunal examined was the purpose or goal of the Catholic organization. Through research and common knowledge, they concluded that the Catholic organization sincerely believed that they have a duty to protect a traditional view of marriage, which excluded same sex unions.

The tribunal found that while the hall's primary purpose is not to advance the interests of the Catholic Church, the hall's managers believed they couldn't rent the hall out to those whose interests oppose the Church.

The tribunal then examined whether the standard is absolutely necessary for establishing the purpose. The tribunal found that forcing the hall to rent out the space to celebrate a homosexual wedding would force the Catholic organization to act against its religious beliefs, and that this would violate the Charter.

However, the tribunal found that the organization could have discriminated in a way that was less injurious to the feelings of the complainants. Instead of simply canceling their appointment, they could have directed them to other halls and assisted them in finding another place to celebrate their wedding. Therefore, the tribunal fined the hall $1,000.

== See also ==
- Masterpiece Cakeshop v. Colorado Civil Rights Commission
