= Canadian Border Peak =

Mountain in British Columbia, Canada

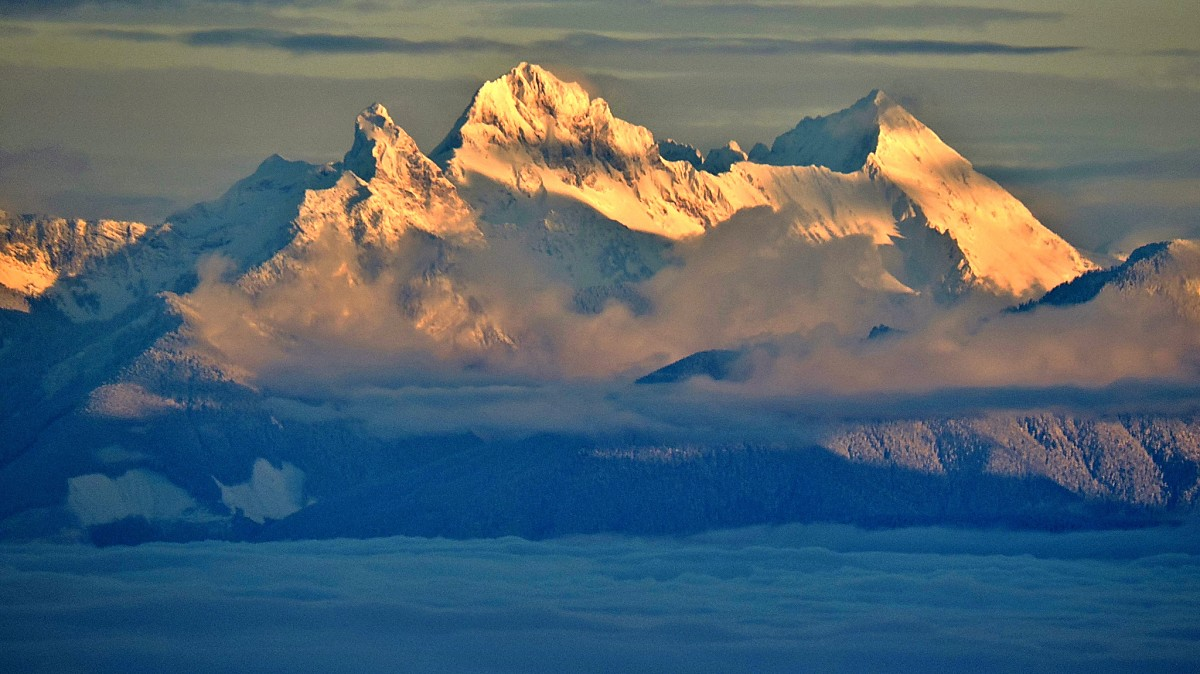
- Canadian Border Peak (left), American Border Peak (middle) and Mount Larrabee (right) seen from Canada

Highest point
- Elevation: 2,291 m (7,516 ft)
- Prominence: 311 m (1,020 ft)
- Listing: Mountains of British Columbia
- Coordinates: 49°00′15″N 121°40′46″W

Geography
- Location within British Columbia
- Interactive map of Canadian Border Peak
- Location: British Columbia, Canada
- District: Yale Division Yale Land District
- Parent range: North Cascades
- Topo map: NTS 92H4 Chilliwack

Climbing
- First ascent: 1932 by T. Fyles and . Henderson

Canadian Border Peak, 2,291 metres (7,516 ft), originally known simply as Border Peak, is a mountain at the head of Tamihi Creek in the Cascade Mountains of the Lower Mainland of British Columbia, Canada. As its name suggests, it is near the Canada–US border and is connected via a high ridge or col to American Border Peak, which is slightly higher at 2,437 metres (7,995 ft). The two together are known as the Border Peaks or American-Canadian Border Peaks and are most easily visible within nearby settled parts of Canada from the northern part of Sumas Prairie and the western part of Chilliwack Prairie in the area of Greendale, which is just east of the boundary between the cities of Chilliwack and Abbotsford.

== Climate ==
Canadian Border Peak is located in the marine west coast climate zone of western North America. Most weather fronts originate in the Pacific Ocean, and travel northeast toward the Cascade Mountains. As fronts approach the North Cascades, they are forced upward by the peaks of the Cascade Range, causing them to drop their moisture in the form of rain or snowfall onto the Cascades. As a result, the west side of the North Cascades experiences high precipitation, especially during the winter months in the form of snowfall. Due to its temperate climate and proximity to the Pacific Ocean, areas west of the Cascade Crest very rarely experience temperatures below 0 °F (−18 °C) or above 80 °F (27 °C). During winter months, weather is usually cloudy, but, due to high pressure systems over the Pacific Ocean that intensify during summer months, there is often little or no cloud cover during the summer. Because of maritime influence, snow tends to be wet and heavy, resulting in high avalanche danger.

== Geology ==
The North Cascades feature some of the most rugged topography in the Cascade Range with craggy peaks, ridges, and deep glacial valleys. Geological events occurring many years ago created the diverse topography and drastic elevation changes over the Cascade Range leading to the various climate differences.

The history of the formation of the Cascade Mountains dates back millions of years ago to the late Eocene Epoch. With the North American Plate overriding the Pacific Plate, episodes of volcanic igneous activity persisted. In addition, small fragments of the oceanic and continental lithosphere called terranes created the North Cascades about 50 million years ago.

During the Pleistocene period dating back over two million years ago, glaciation advancing and retreating repeatedly scoured the landscape leaving deposits of rock debris. The U-shaped cross section of the river valleys is a result of recent glaciation. Uplift and faulting in combination with glaciation have been the dominant processes which have created the tall peaks and deep valleys of the North Cascades area.

== Gallery ==
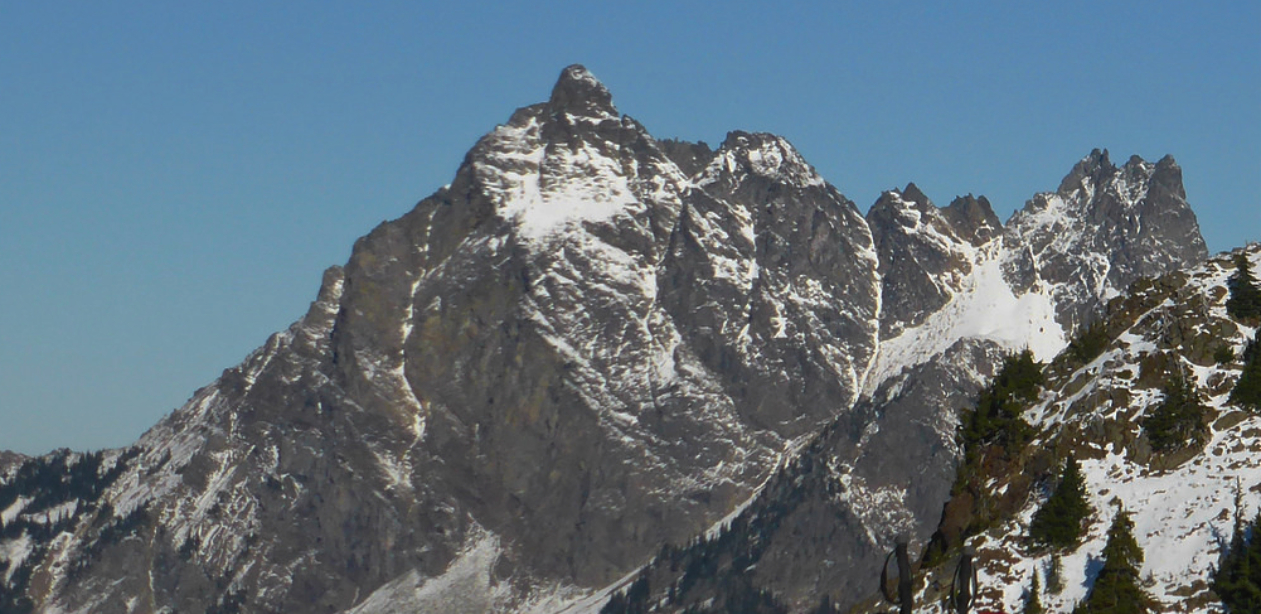
Canadian Border Peak
