= Diocese of British Columbia =

Diocese of the Anglican Church in Canada

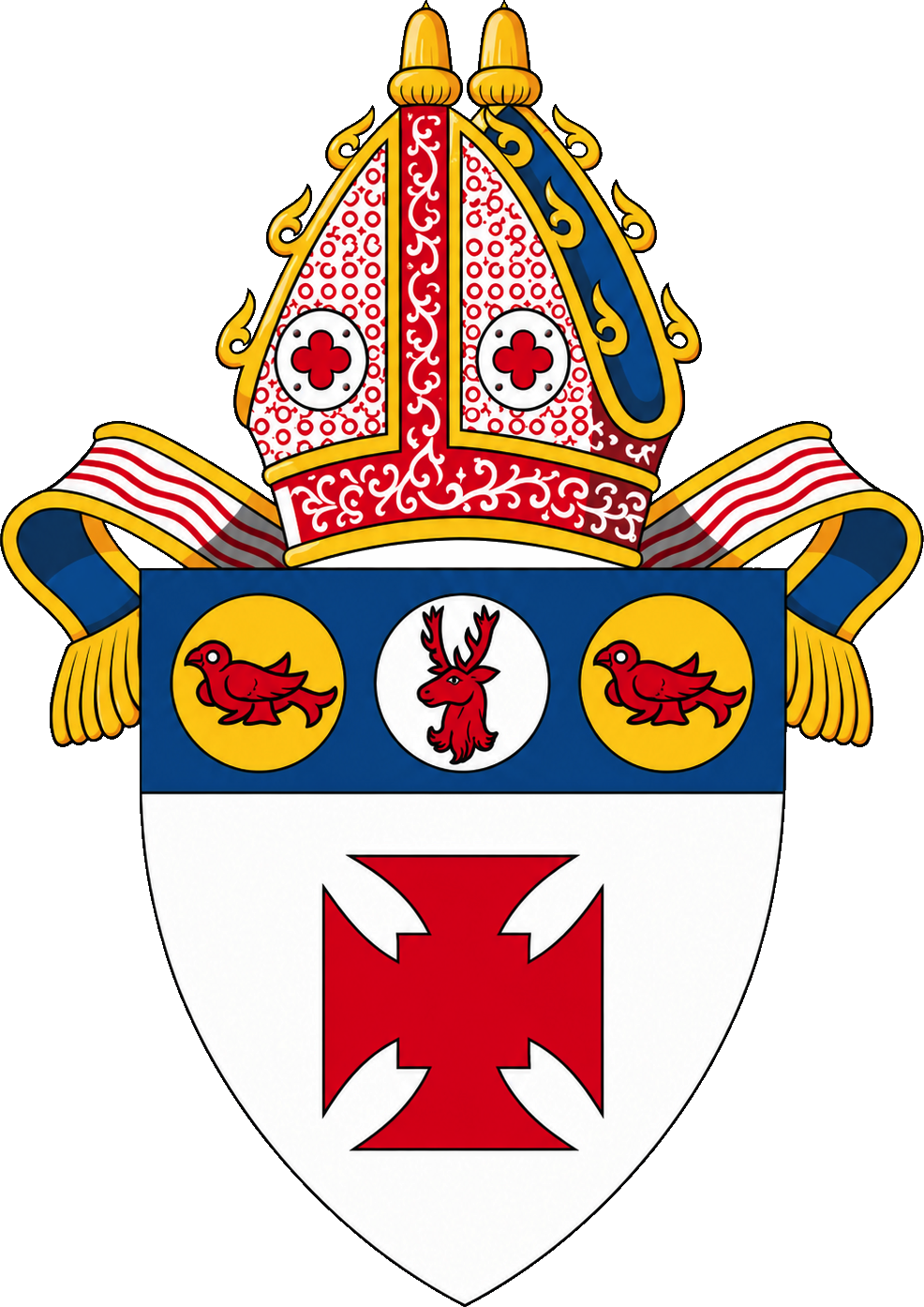

Location
- Ecclesiastical province: British Columbia and Yukon

Statistics
- Parishes: 45 (2022)
- Members: 4,890 (2022)

Information
- Rite: Anglican
- Cathedral: Christ Church Cathedral (Victoria, British Columbia)

Current leadership
- Bishop: Anna Greenwood-Lee

Map
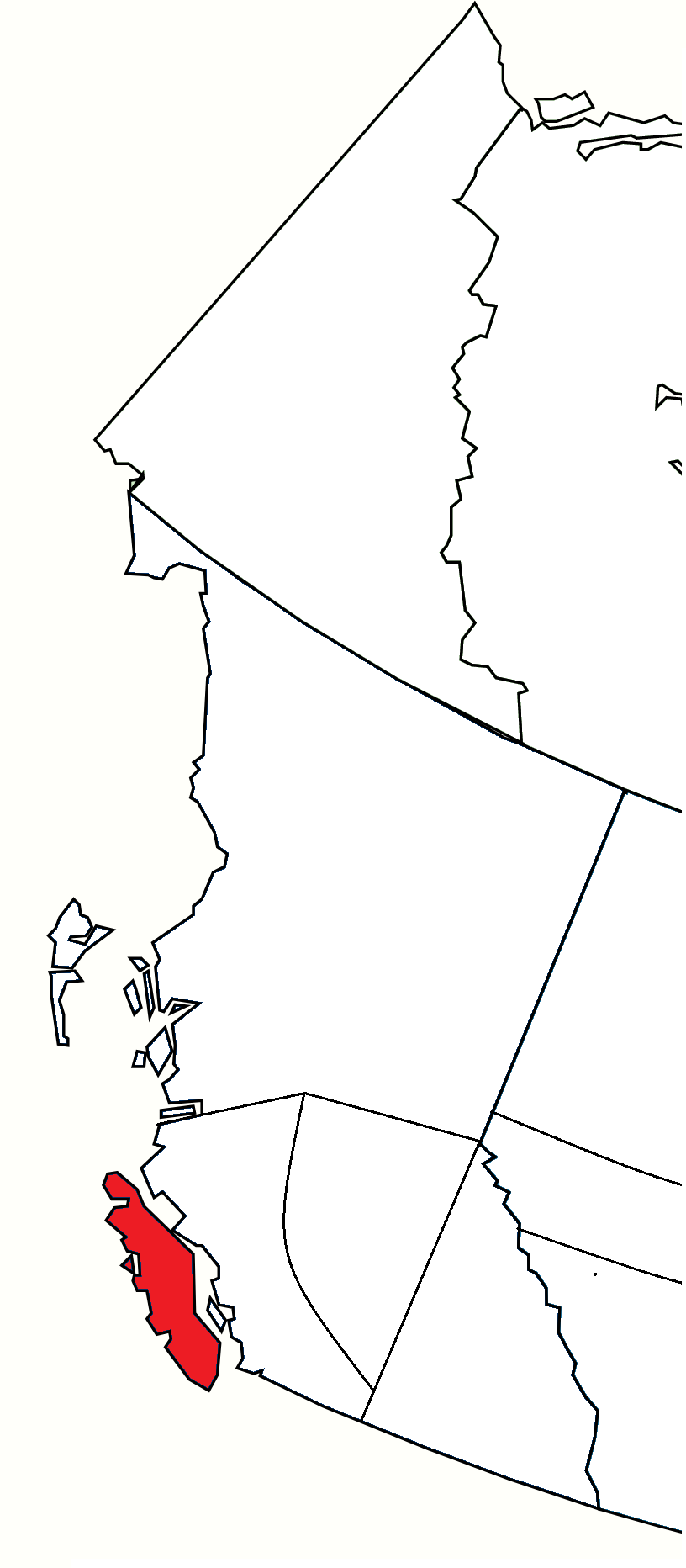
- Location of the diocese within the Ecclesiastical Province of British Columbia and Yukon.

Website
- bc.anglican.ca

The Diocese of British Columbia, also known as the Anglican Diocese of Islands and Inlets, is a diocese of the Ecclesiastical Province of British Columbia and Yukon of the Anglican Church of Canada.

Despite the name, the diocese comprises only the 32,630 square kilometres of Vancouver Island and the adjacent Gulf Islands in the civil Province of British Columbia. Its see city is Victoria, and it presently maintains 45 parishes serving nearly 7,000 Anglicans according to the most recent statistics published by the ACC.

The diocese was established in 1859, and is the oldest in the ecclesiastical province, once extending over the entire civil province of British Columbia, hence the origin of its name. Its first bishop was George Hills. In 1866, there were two archdeaconries: H. P. Wright was Archdeacon of Columbia and Samuel Gilson of Vancouver. Notable parishes include Christ Church Cathedral and the Church of St. John the Divine, both in Victoria. The current bishop is Anna Greenwood-Lee.

As part of the diocese's commitments to making indigenous land acknowledgements, the diocese around June 2021 began replacing its formal name referencing the colonial identity of British Columbia with the alternative name Anglican Diocese of Islands and Inlets on its website, in its newsletters, and other publicity materials.

== Bishops of British Columbia ==
No.	Image	Name	Dates	Notes
1		George Hills	1859–1892	
2		William Perrin	1893–1911	
3		Charles Roper	1912–1915	Bishop of Ottawa 1915–1939, Metropolitan of Ontario 1933–39
4		Augustine Scriven	1915–1916	
5		Charles Schofield	1916–1936	
6		Harold Sexton	1936–1967	Archbishop of British Columbia 1952–1969
7		John Anderson	1967–1969	
8		Frederick Gartrell	1969–1979	
9		Hywel Jones	1979–1984	
10		Ron Shepherd	1984–1991	
11		Barry Jenks	1992–2002	
12		James Cowan	2004–2012	
13		Logan McMenamie	2014–2020	
14		Anna Greenwood-Lee	2021–present	
