= George Hills =

Canadian Anglican bishop

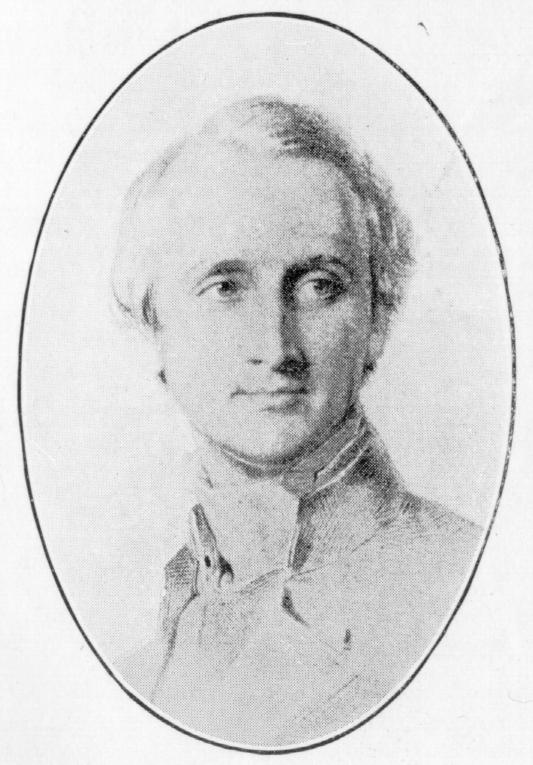
George Hills

George Hills (June 21, 1816 – December 10, 1895) was a Canadian Anglican bishop.

He was born in Eythorne, England. His father was a rear-admiral in the British navy. He was educated at Durham University, ordained a priest in 1840, and was successively curate of North Shields, lecturer and curate at Leeds Parish Church, and a Vicar of Great Yarmouth.

He became canon of Norwich Cathedral in 1850, and in 1859 was consecrated at Westminster Abbey as the first bishop of the Diocese of British Columbia. He arrived in 1860, taking the final leg of his journey from San Francisco to Victoria a week before his travelling companion Frank Blomfield, who drowned in the SS Northerner disaster. He was kept busy travelling around the diocese, working with First Nations groups, and creating churches and schools.

Hills and former Hudson's Bay Company chaplain Edward Cridge had strong disagreements which resulted in a court case in 1874 (Cridge became later a Bishop in the Reformed Episcopal Church). Hills returned to England in 1892 and died in Suffolk three years later. Bishop Hills Memorial Church of St Mary the Virgin, located in Vancouver, is named for him.
