= Rowan Williams =

Archbishop of Canterbury from 2003 to 2012

The Right Reverend and Right Honourable The Lord Williams of Oystermouth PC FBA FRSL FLSW
- Archbishop of Canterbury
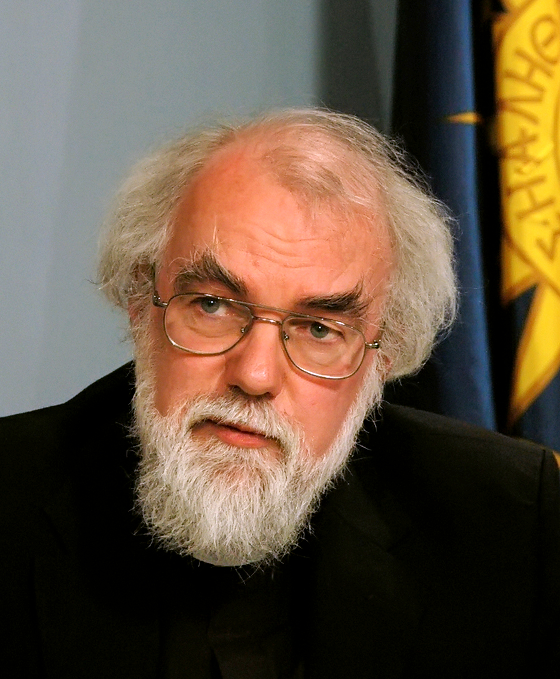
- Williams in 2007
- Church: Church of England
- Province: Canterbury
- Diocese: Canterbury
- Elected: 2 December 2002
- Installed: 27 February 2003
- Term ended: 31 December 2012 (retired)
- Predecessor: George Carey
- Successor: Justin Welby
- Other posts: Archbishop of Wales (2000–2002); Bishop of Monmouth (1992–2002)

Orders
- Ordination: 2 October 1977 (deacon) by Eric Wall; 2 July 1978 (priest) by Peter Walker
- Consecration: 1 May 1992 by Alwyn Rice Jones

Personal details
- Born: Rowan Douglas Williams; 14 June 1950 (age 76) Ystradgynlais, Powys, Wales
- Denomination: Anglicanism
- Parents: Aneurin Williams; Delphine née Morris
- Spouse: Jane Paul (m. 1981)
- Children: 2
- Profession: Bishop, theologian
- Education: Christ's College, Cambridge; Wadham College, Oxford
- Motto: Cultus Dei Sapientia Hominis; "(The worship of God is the wisdom of man")
- Signature: The Lord Williams of Oystermouth's signature

- Coat of arms: The Lord Williams of Oystermouth's coat of arms

Master of Magdalene College, Cambridge
- In office January 2013 – October 2020
- Preceded by: Duncan Robinson
- Succeeded by: Sir Christopher Greenwood

Member of the House of Lords
- Lord Temporal
- Life peerage 8 January 2013 – 31 August 2020
- Lord Spiritual
- Ex officio as Archbishop of Canterbury; 3 February 2003 – 31 December 2012

Academic background
- Education: Dynevor School, Swansea
- Alma mater: Christ's College, Cambridge; Wadham College, Oxford; College of the Resurrection
- Thesis: The Theology of Vladimir Nikolaievich Lossky: An Exposition and Critique (1975)

Academic work
- Discipline: Theology
- Sub-discipline: Church Fathers; moral theology
- School or tradition: Affirming Catholicism
- Institutions: College of the Resurrection; Westcott House, Cambridge; Clare College, Cambridge; Faculty of Divinity, University of Cambridge; Christ Church, Oxford; Faculty of Theology and Religion, University of Oxford; Magdalene College, Cambridge; St. Stephen's House, Oxford

Rowan Douglas Williams, Baron Williams of Oystermouth (born 14 June 1950), is a Welsh Anglican bishop, theologian and poet, who served as the 104th Archbishop of Canterbury from 2002 to 2012. Previously the Bishop of Monmouth and Archbishop of Wales, Williams was the first Archbishop of Canterbury in modern times not to be appointed from within the Church of England.

Williams's primacy was marked by speculation that the Anglican Communion (in which the Archbishop of Canterbury is the leading figure) was fragmenting over disagreements on contemporary issues such as homosexuality and the ordination of women. Williams worked to keep all sides in dialogue. Notable events during his time as Archbishop of Canterbury include the rejection by a majority of dioceses of his proposed Anglican Covenant and, in the final general synod of his tenure, his unsuccessful attempt to secure a sufficient majority for a measure to allow the appointment of women as bishops in the Church of England.

Having spent much of his earlier career as an academic at the universities of Cambridge and Oxford successively, Williams speaks three languages and reads at least nine.

Williams retired as Archbishop of Canterbury on 31 December 2012 and was succeeded by Justin Welby. On 26 December 2012, 10 Downing Street had announced Williams's elevation to the peerage as a life peer, so that he could continue to speak in the House of Lords. Following the creation of his title on 8 January and its gazetting on 11 January 2013, he was introduced to the temporal benches of the House of Lords as Baron Williams of Oystermouth on 15 January 2013, sitting as a crossbencher. Oystermouth is a district of Swansea.

Williams delivered the Gifford Lectures at the University of Edinburgh in 2013 and served as Master of Magdalene College, Cambridge, between 2013 and 2020. He took up the position of chancellor of the University of South Wales in 2014. He retired from the House of Lords on 31 August 2020 and from Magdalene College that autumn, returning to Abergavenny in his former Diocese of Monmouth.

== Early life and ordination ==
Williams was born on 14 June 1950 in Ystradgynlais, now in the county of Powys, Wales, into a Welsh-speaking family. He was the only child of Nancy Delphine (known as "Del") (née Morris) and Aneurin Williams – Presbyterians who became Anglicans in 1961. In 1954 the Williams family relocated to Swansea where he attended the state sector Dynevor Secondary Grammar School, before reading theology at Christ's College, Cambridge, graduating with starred first-class honours. He then went to Wadham College, Oxford, where he studied under A. M. Allchin and graduated with a Doctor of Philosophy degree in 1975 with a thesis titled "The Theology of Vladimir Nikolaievich Lossky: An Exposition and Critique".

Williams lectured and trained for ordination at the College of the Resurrection in Mirfield, West Yorkshire, for two years (1975–1977). In 1977, he returned to Cambridge to teach theology as a tutor (as well as chaplain and director of studies) at Westcott House; he was made a deacon in the chapel by Eric Wall, Bishop of Huntingdon, at Michaelmas (2 October). While there, he was ordained a priest the Petertide following (2 July 1978), by Peter Walker, Bishop of Ely, at Ely Cathedral.

== Personal life ==
On 4 July 1981, Williams married Jane Paul, a writer and lecturer in theology. They have two children.

Williams speaks or reads eleven languages: English, Welsh, Spanish, French, German, Russian, Biblical Hebrew, Syriac, Latin, and both Ancient (koine) and Modern Greek. He learnt Russian in order to be able to read the works of Dostoevsky in the original. He has since described his spoken German as a "disaster area" and said that he is "a very clumsy reader and writer of Russian". He also stated that he knows some Italian, which means he knows twelve languages.

== Career ==
=== Early academic career and pastoral ministry ===
Williams did not have a formal curacy until 1980, when he served at St George's, Chesterton, Cambridge, until 1983, after having been appointed a university lecturer in divinity at Cambridge. In 1984, he became dean and chaplain of Clare College and, in 1986 at the age of 36, he was appointed the Lady Margaret Professor of Divinity at Oxford, a position which brought with it appointment to a residentiary canonry of Christ Church Cathedral. In 1989, he received the degree of Doctor of Divinity (DD) and, in 1990, was elected a Fellow of the British Academy (FBA).

=== Episcopal ministry ===
On 5 December 1991, Williams was elected Bishop of Monmouth in the Church in Wales: he was consecrated a bishop on 1 May 1992 at St Asaph Cathedral and enthroned at Newport Cathedral on 14 May. He continued to serve as Bishop of Monmouth after he was elected to also be the Archbishop of Wales in December 1999, in which capacity he was enthroned again at Newport Cathedral on 26 February 2000.

In 2002, he was announced as the successor to George Carey as Archbishop of Canterbury — the senior bishop in the Church of England. The Archbishop of Canterbury in England acts as a focus of unity recognised as primus inter pares ("first among equals") but does not exercise authority in Anglican provinces outside the Church of England. As a bishop of the disestablished Church in Wales, Williams was the first Archbishop of Canterbury since the English Reformation to be appointed to this office from outside the Church of England. His election by the chapter of Canterbury Cathedral was confirmed by nine bishops in the customary ceremony in London on 2 December 2002, when he officially became Archbishop of Canterbury. He was enthroned at Canterbury Cathedral on 27 February 2003 as the 104th Archbishop of Canterbury.

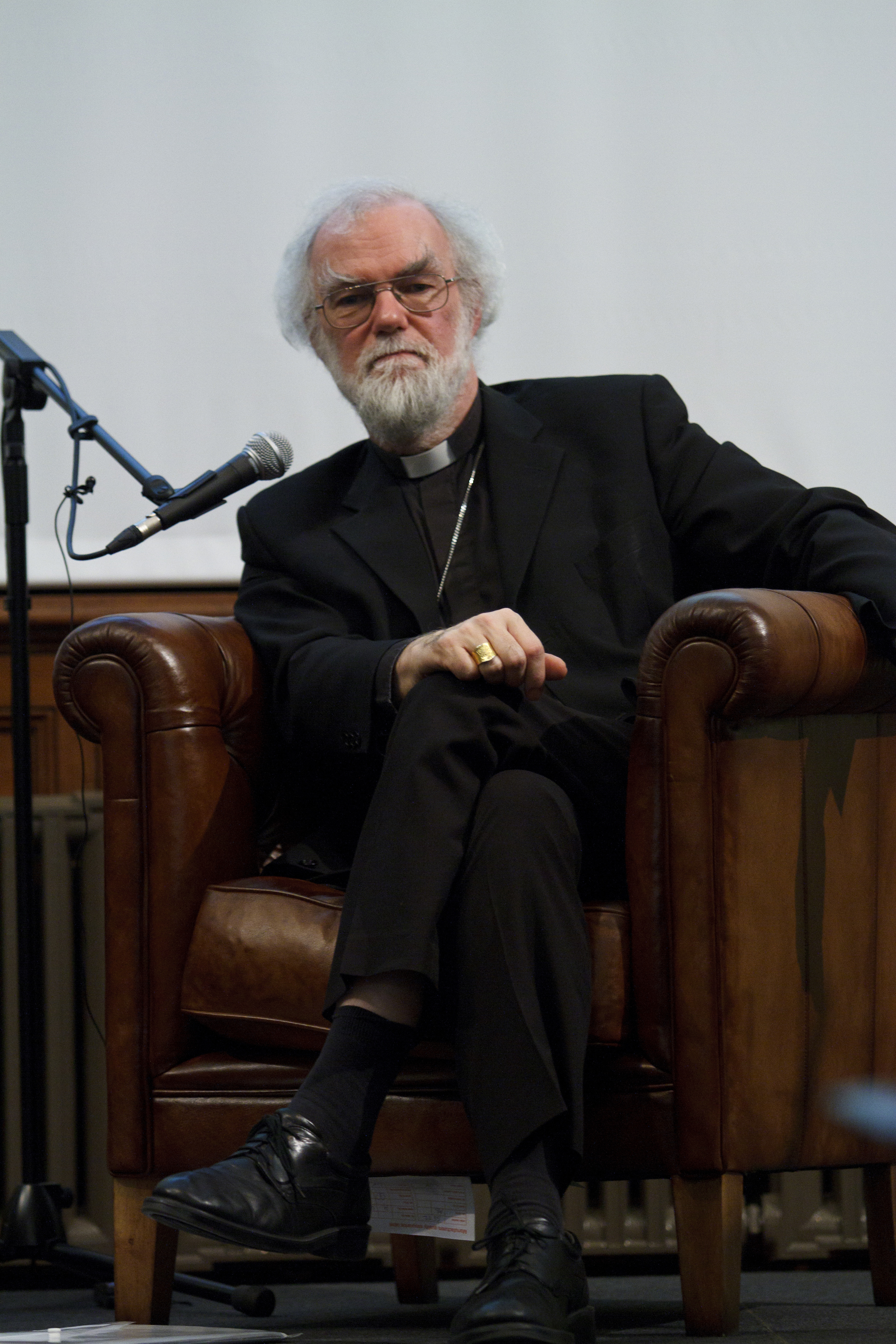
Williams visiting the National Assembly for Wales, March 2012

The translation of Williams to Canterbury was widely canvassed. As a bishop he had demonstrated a wide range of interests in social and political matters and was widely regarded, by academics and others, as a figure who could make Christianity credible to the intelligent unbeliever. As a patron of Affirming Catholicism, his appointment was a considerable departure from that of his predecessor and his views, such as those expressed in a widely published lecture on homosexuality were criticised by a number of evangelical and conservative Anglicans. The debate had begun to divide the Anglican Communion, however, and Williams, in his new role as its leader was to have an important role.

As Archbishop of Canterbury, Williams acted ex officio as visitor of King's College London, the University of Kent and Keble College, Oxford, governor of Charterhouse School, and, since 2005, as (inaugural) chancellor of Canterbury Christ Church University. In addition to these ex officio roles, Cambridge University awarded him an honorary doctorate in divinity in 2006; in April 2007, Trinity College and Wycliffe College, both associated with the University of Toronto, awarded him a joint Doctor of Divinity degree during his first visit to Canada since being enthroned and he also received honorary degrees and fellowships from various universities including Kent, Oxford, and Roehampton.

Williams is also a poet and translator of poetry. His collection The Poems of Rowan Williams, published by Perpetua Press, was longlisted for the Wales Book of the Year award in 2004. Besides his own poems, which have a strong spiritual and landscape flavour, the collection contains several fluent translations from Welsh poets. He was criticised in the press for allegedly supporting a "pagan organisation", the Welsh Gorsedd of Bards, which promotes Welsh language and literature and uses druidic ceremonial but is actually not religious in nature.

In 2005, Prince Charles married Camilla Parker Bowles, a divorcee, in a civil ceremony. Afterwards, Williams gave the couple a formal service of blessing. In fact, the arrangements for the wedding and service were strongly supported by the Archbishop "consistent with the Church of England guidelines concerning remarriage". The "strongly-worded" act of penitence by the couple, a confessional prayer written by Thomas Cranmer, Archbishop of Canterbury, to King Henry VIII, was interpreted as a confession by the bride and groom of past sins, albeit without specific reference and going "some way towards acknowledging concerns" over their past misdemeanours.

Williams officiated at the wedding of Prince William and Catherine Middleton on 29 April 2011.

On 16 November 2011, Williams attended a special service at Westminster Abbey celebrating the 400th anniversary of the King James Bible in the presence of Queen Elizabeth, Prince Philip and Prince Charles, Patron of the King James Bible Trust.

To mark the ending of his tenure as Archbishop of Canterbury, Williams presented a BBC television documentary about Canterbury Cathedral, in which he reflected upon his time in office. Titled Goodbye to Canterbury, the programme was screened on 1 January 2013.

==== 2010 General Synod address ====
On 9 February 2010, in an address to the General Synod of the Church of England, Williams warned that damaging infighting over the ordination of women as bishops and gay priests could lead to a permanent split in the Anglican Communion. He stressed that he did not "want nor relish" the prospect of division and called on the Church of England and Anglicans worldwide to step back from a "betrayal" of God's mission and to put the work of Christ before schism. But he conceded that, unless Anglicans could find a way to live with their differences over women as bishops and homosexual ordination, the church would change shape and become a multi-tier communion of different levels – a schism in all but name.

Williams also said that "it may be that the covenant creates a situation in which there are different levels of relationship between those claiming the name of Anglican. I don’t at all want or relish this, but suspect that, without a major change of heart all round, it may be an unavoidable aspect of limiting the damage we are already doing to ourselves." In such a structure, some churches would be given full membership of the Anglican Communion, while others had a lower-level form of membership, with no more than observer status on some issues. Williams also used his keynote address to issue a profound apology for the way that he had spoken about "exemplary and sacrificial" gay Anglican priests in the past. "There are ways of speaking about the question that seem to ignore these human realities or to undervalue them," he said. "I have been criticised for doing just this, and I am profoundly sorry for the carelessness that could give such an impression."

=== Subsequent academic career ===
On 17 January 2013, Williams was admitted as the 35th Master of Magdalene College, Cambridge and served until September 2020. He was also made an honorary Professor of Contemporary Christian Thought by the University of Cambridge in 2017. On 18 June 2013, the University of South Wales announced his appointment as its new chancellor, the ceremonial head of the university.

In 2015, it was reported that Williams had written a play called Shakeshafte, about a meeting between William Shakespeare and Edmund Campion, a Jesuit priest and martyr. Williams suspects that Shakespeare was Catholic, though not a regular churchgoer. The play took to the stage in July 2016 and was received favourably.

== Patronage ==
Williams is patron of the Canterbury Open Centre run by Catching Lives, a local charity supporting the destitute. He has also been patron of the Peace Mala Youth Project For World Peace since 2002, one of his last engagements as Archbishop of Wales being to lead the charity's launch ceremony. In addition, he is president of WaveLength Charity, a UK-wide organisation which gives TVs and radios to isolated and vulnerable people; every Archbishop of Canterbury since the charity's inception in 1939 has actively participated in this role.

Williams is also patron of the T. S. Eliot Society and delivered the society's annual lecture in November 2013.

Williams was also patron of the Birmingham-based charity The Feast, from 2010 until his retirement as Archbishop of Canterbury.

Williams has been a patron of the Cogwheel Trust, a local Cambridgeshire charity providing affordable counselling, since 2015 and is active in his support.

On 1 May 2013 he became chair of the board of trustees of Christian Aid. He is the Chair of Trustees of the Council for the Defence of the British Universities (CDBU).

Together with Grey Ruthven, 2nd Earl of Gowrie, and Sir Daniel Day-Lewis, Williams is a patron of the Wilfred Owen Association, formed in 1989 to commemorate the life and work of the World War I poet Wilfred Owen.

He is the visitor of the Oratory of the Good Shepherd, a dispersed Anglican religious community of male priests and lay brothers. He also acts as a visitor to the new monastic Holywell Community in Abergavenny.

He is also a patron of the Fellowship of Saint Alban and Saint Sergius which promotes ecumenical relationships between the Anglican and Orthodox churches. As of 2026, Williams is also a patron of Operation Noah, a Christian climate charity.

== Theology ==
Williams, a scholar of the Church Fathers and a historian of Christian spirituality, wrote in 1983 that orthodoxy should be seen "as a tool rather than an end in itself..." It is not something which stands still. Thus "old styles come under increasing strain, new speech needs to be generated". He sees orthodoxy as a number of "dialogues": a constant dialogue with Christ, crucified and risen; but also that of the community of faith with the world – "a risky enterprise", as he writes. "We ought to be puzzled", he says, "when the world is not challenged by the gospel." It may mean that Christians have not understood the kinds of bondage to which the gospel is addressed. He has also written that "orthodoxy is inseparable from sacramental practice... The eucharist is the paradigm of that dialogue which is 'orthodoxy'". This stance may help to explain both his social radicalism and his view of the importance of the Church, and thus of the holding together of the Anglican communion over matters such as homosexuality: his belief in the idea of the Church is profound.

John Shelby Spong once accused Williams of being a "neo-medievalist", preaching orthodoxy to the people in the pew but knowing in private that it is not true. In an interview with the magazine Third Way, Williams responded:

I am genuinely a lot more conservative than he would like me to be. Take the Resurrection. I think he has said that of course I know what all the reputable scholars think on the subject and therefore when I talk about the risen body I must mean something other than the empty tomb. But I don't. I don't know how to persuade him, but I really don't.

Although generally considered an Anglo-Catholic, Williams has broad sympathies. One of his first publications, in the largely evangelical Grove Books series, has the title Eucharistic Sacrifice: The Roots of a Metaphor.

=== Moral theology ===
Williams's contributions to Anglican views of homosexuality were perceived as quite liberal before he became the Archbishop of Canterbury. These views are evident in a paper written by Williams called "The Body's Grace", which he originally delivered as the 10th Michael Harding Memorial Address in 1989 to the Lesbian and Gay Christian Movement, and which is now part of a series of essays collected in the book Theology and Sexuality (ed. Eugene Rogers, Blackwells 2002). At the Lambeth Conference in July 1998, then Bishop Rowan Williams of Monmouth abstained and did not vote in favour of the conservative resolution on human sexuality. These actions, combined with his initial support for openly gay Canon Jeffrey John, gained him support among liberals and caused frustration for conservatives.

== Social views ==
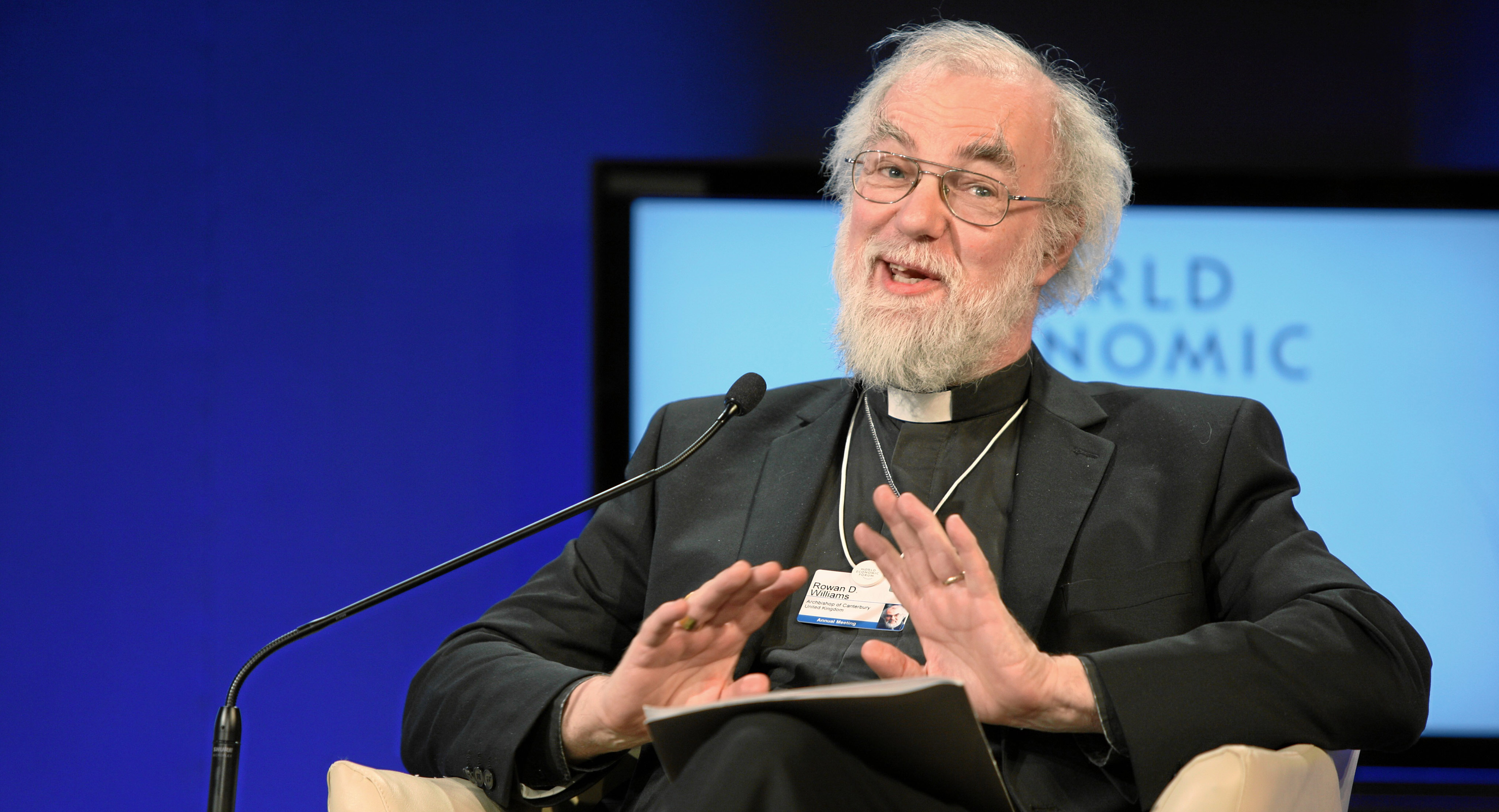
Williams speaking at the 2010 World Economic Forum in Davos

His interest in and involvement with social issues is longstanding. While chaplain of Clare College, Cambridge, Williams took part in anti-nuclear demonstrations at United States bases. He said he was part of a small group from Cambridge Christian CND who climbed into the USAF base at RAF Alconbury on Ash Wednesday 1985, held a service on the runway with scattering of ashes; they were arrested and released in Huntingdon.

In 1985, he was arrested for singing psalms as part of a protest organised by the Campaign for Nuclear Disarmament at Lakenheath, an American air base in Suffolk; his fine was paid by his college. At this time, he was a member of the left-wing Anglo-Catholic Jubilee Group headed by Kenneth Leech and he collaborated with Leech in a number of publications including the anthology of essays to commemorate the 150th anniversary of the Oxford Movement titled Essays Catholic and Radical in 1983.

He was in New York at the time of September 2001 attacks, only yards from Ground Zero delivering a lecture; he subsequently wrote a short book, Writing in the Dust, offering reflections on the event. In reference to Al Qaeda, he said that terrorists "can have serious moral goals" and that "Bombast about evil individuals doesn't help in understanding anything." He subsequently worked with Muslim leaders in England and on the third anniversary of 9/11 spoke, by invitation, at the Al-Azhar University Institute in Cairo on the subject of the Trinity. He stated that the followers of the will of God should not be led into ways of violence. He contributed to the debate prior to the 2005 general election criticising assertions that immigration was a cause of crime. Williams has argued that the provisional adoption of Islamic sharia law as a valid means of arbitration (in matters such as marriage) among Muslim communities in the United Kingdom is "unavoidable", and should not be resisted.

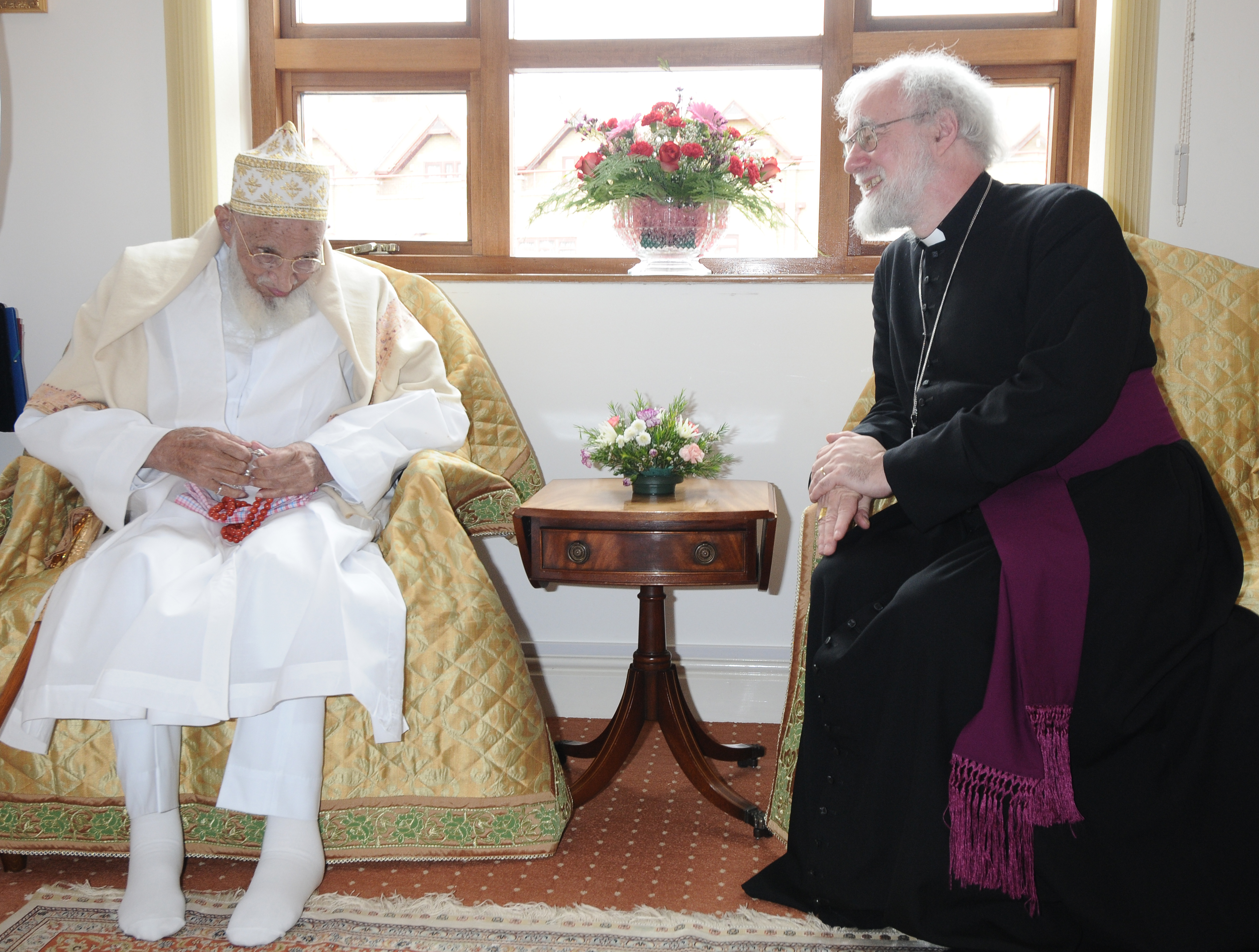
Williams in conversation with Burhanuddin, an Indian Islamic leader, in London (2010)

On 15 November 2008 Williams visited the Balaji Temple in Tividale, West Midlands, on a goodwill mission to represent the friendship between Christianity and Hinduism. On 6 May 2010 Williams met Indian Islamic leader, Mohammed Burhanuddin, at Huseini Mosque in Northolt, London, to discuss the need for interfaith co-operation; and planted a "tree of faith" in the mosque's grounds to signify the many commonalities between the two religions.

=== Economics ===
In 2002, Williams delivered the Richard Dimbleby lecture and chose to talk about the problematic nature of the nation-state but also of its successors. He cited the "market state" as offering an inadequate vision of the way a state should operate, partly because it was liable to short-term and narrowed concerns (thus rendering it incapable of dealing with, for instance, issues relating to the degradation of the natural environment) and partly because a public arena which had become value-free was liable to disappear amidst the multitude of competing private interests. (He noted the same moral vacuum in British society after his visit to China in 2006.) He is not uncritical of communitarianism, but his reservations about consumerism have been a constant theme. These views have often been expressed in quite strong terms; for example, he once commented that "Every transaction in the developed economies of the West can be interpreted as an act of aggression against the economic losers in the worldwide game."

Williams has supported the Robin Hood tax campaign since March 2010, re-affirming his support in a November 2011 article he published in the Financial Times. He is also a vocal opponent of tax avoidance and a proponent of corporate social responsibility, arguing that "economic growth and prosperity are about serving the human good, not about serving private ends".

=== Iraq War and possible attack on Syria or Iran ===
Williams was to repeat his opposition to American action in October 2002 when he signed a petition against the Iraq War as being against United Nations (UN) ethics and Christian teaching, and "lowering the threshold of war unacceptably". Again on 30 June 2004, together with then-Archbishop of York, David Hope, and on behalf of all 114 Church of England bishops, he wrote to Tony Blair expressing deep concern about UK government policy and criticising the coalition troops' conduct in Iraq. The letter cited the abuse of Iraqi detainees, which was described as having been "deeply damaging" — and stated that the government's apparent double standards "diminish the credibility of western governments". In December 2006 he expressed doubts in an interview on the Today programme on BBC Radio 4 about whether he had done enough to oppose the war.

On 5 October 2007, Williams visited Iraqi refugees in Syria. In a BBC interview after his trip he described advocates of a United States attack on Syria or Iran as "criminal, ignorant and potentially murderous". He said, "When people talk about further destabilization of the region and you read some American political advisers speaking of action against Syria and Iran, I can only say that I regard that as criminal, ignorant and potentially murderous folly." A few days earlier, the former US ambassador to the UN John R. Bolton had called for the bombing of Iran at a fringe meeting of the Conservative Party conference. In Williams's Humanitas Programme lecture at the University of Oxford in January 2014, he "characterized the impulse to intervene as a need to be seen to do something rather than nothing" and advocated for "a religiously motivated nonviolence which refuses to idolise human intervention in all circumstances."

=== Unity of the Anglican Communion ===
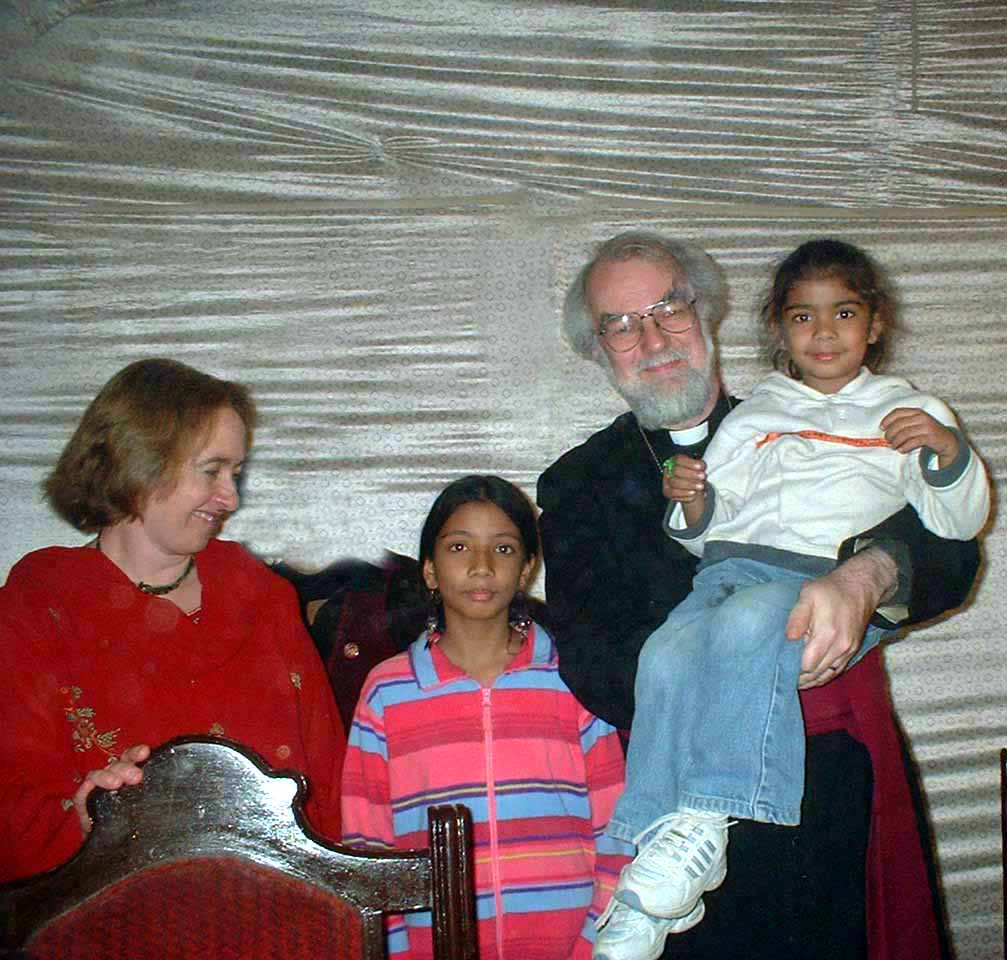
Williams visiting Pakistan in 2005

Williams became Archbishop of Canterbury at a particularly difficult time in the relations of the churches of the Anglican Communion. His predecessor, George Carey, had sought to keep the peace between the theologically conservative primates of the communion such as Peter Akinola of Nigeria and Drexel Gomez of the West Indies and liberals such as Frank Griswold, the then primate of the US Episcopal Church.

In 2003, in an attempt to encourage dialogue, Williams appointed Robin Eames, Archbishop of Armagh and Primate of All Ireland, as chairman of the Lambeth Commission on Communion, to examine the challenges to the unity of the Anglican Communion, stemming from the consecration of Gene Robinson as Bishop of New Hampshire, and the blessing of same-sex unions in the Diocese of New Westminster. (Robinson was in a same-sex relationship.) The Windsor Report, as it was called, was published in October 2004. It recommended solidifying the connection between the churches of the communion by having each church ratify an "Anglican Covenant" that would commit them to consulting the wider communion when making major decisions. It also urged those who had contributed to disunity to express their regret.

In November 2005, following a meeting of Anglicans of the "global south" in Cairo at which Williams had addressed them in conciliatory terms, 12 primates who had been present sent him a letter sharply criticising his leadership which said that "We are troubled by your reluctance to use your moral authority to challenge the Episcopal Church and the Anglican Church of Canada." The letter acknowledged his eloquence but strongly criticised his reluctance to take sides in the communion's theological crisis and urged him to make explicit threats to those more liberal churches. Questions were later asked about the authority and provenance of the letter as two additional signatories' names had been added although they had left the meeting before it was produced. Subsequently, the Church of Nigeria appointed an American cleric to deal with relations between the United States and Nigerian churches outside the normal channels. Williams expressed his reservations about this to the General Synod of the Church of England.

Williams later established a working party to examine what a "covenant" between the provinces of the Anglican Communion would mean in line with the Windsor Report.

=== Position on Freemasonry ===
In a leaked private letter, Williams said that he "had real misgivings about the compatibility of Masonry and Christian profession" and that while he was Bishop of Monmouth he had prevented the appointment of Freemasons to senior positions within his diocese. The leaking of this letter in 2003 caused a controversy, which he sought to defuse by apologising for the distress caused and stating that he did not question "the good faith and generosity of individual Freemasons", not least as his father had been a Freemason. However, he also reiterated his concern about Christian ministers adopting "a private system of profession and initiation, involving the taking of oaths of loyalty."

=== Opinion about hijab and terrorism ===
Williams objected to a proposed French law banning the wearing of the hijab, a traditional Islamic headscarf for women, in French schools. He said that the hijab and any other religious symbols should not be outlawed.

Williams also spoke up against the scapegoating of Muslims in the aftermath of the 7 July 2005 London bombings on underground trains and a bus, which killed 52 and wounded about 700. The initial blame was placed on Al-Qaeda, but Muslims at large were targeted for reprisals: four mosques in England were assaulted and Muslims were verbally insulted in streets and their cars and houses were vandalised. Williams strongly condemned the terrorist attacks and stated that they could not be justified. However, he added that "any person can commit a crime in the name of religion and it is not particularly Islam to be blamed. Some persons committed deeds in the name of Islam but the deeds contradict Islamic belief and philosophy completely."

=== Creationism ===
Williams responded to a controversy regarding creationism being taught in privately sponsored academies saying that it should not be presented in schools as an alternative to evolution. When asked if he was comfortable with the teaching of creationism, he said "I think creationism is, in a sense, a kind of category mistake, as if the Bible were a theory like other theories" and "My worry is creationism can end up reducing the doctrine of creation rather than enhancing it."

Williams has maintained traditional support amongst Anglicans and their leaders for the teaching of evolution as fully compatible with Christianity. This support has dated at least back to Frederick Temple's tenure as Archbishop of Canterbury.

=== Interview with Emel magazine ===
In November 2007, Williams gave an interview for Emel magazine, a British Muslim magazine. Williams condemned the United States and certain Christian groups for their role in the Middle East, while his criticism of some trends within Islam went largely unreported. As reported by The Times, he was greatly critical of the United States, the Iraq War, and Christian Zionists, yet made "only mild criticisms of the Islamic world". He claimed "the United States wields its power in a way that is worse than Britain during its imperial heyday". He compared Muslims in Britain to the Good Samaritans, and praised the Muslim salat ritual of five prayers a day, but said in Muslim nations, the "present political solutions aren't always very impressive".

=== Sharia law ===
Williams was the subject of a media and press furore in February 2008 following a lecture he gave to the Temple Foundation at the Royal Courts of Justice on the subject of "Islam and English Law". He raised the question of conflicting loyalties which communities might have, cultural, religious and civic. He also argued that theology has a place in debates about the very nature of law "however hard our culture may try to keep it out" and noted that there is, in a "dominant human rights philosophy", a reluctance to acknowledge the liberty of conscientious objection. He spoke of "supplementary jurisdictions" to that of the civil law. Noting the anxieties which the word sharia provoked in the West, he drew attention to the fact that there was a debate within Islam between what he called "primitivists" for whom, for instance, apostasy should still be punishable and those Muslims who argued that sharia was a developing system of Islamic jurisprudence and that such a view was no longer acceptable. He made comparisons with Orthodox Jewish practice (beth din) and with the recognition of the exercise of conscience of Christians.

Williams's words were critically interpreted as proposing a parallel jurisdiction to the civil law for Muslims (Sharia) and were the subject of demands from elements of the press and media for his resignation. He also attracted criticism from elements of the Anglican Communion.

In response, Williams stated in a BBC interview that "certain provision[s] of sharia are already recognised in our society and under our law; ... we already have in this country a number of situations in which the internal law of religious communities is recognised by the law of the land as justified conscientious objections in certain circumstances in providing certain kinds of social relations" and that "we have Orthodox Jewish courts operating in this country legally and in a regulated way because there are modes of dispute resolution and customary provisions which apply there in the light of Talmud." Williams also denied accusations of proposing a parallel Islamic legal system within Britain. Williams also said of sharia: "In some of the ways it has been codified and practised across the world, it has been appalling and applied to women in places like Saudi Arabia, it is grim."

Williams's position received more support from the legal community, following a speech given on 4 July 2008 by Nicholas Phillips, Lord Chief Justice of England and Wales. He supported the idea that sharia could be reasonably employed as a basis for "mediation or other forms of alternative dispute resolution". He went further to defend the position Williams had taken earlier in the year, explaining that "It was not very radical to advocate embracing sharia law in the context of family disputes, for example, and our system already goes a long way towards accommodating the archbishop's suggestion."; and that "It is possible in this country for those who are entering into a contractual agreement to agree that the agreement shall be governed by a law other than English law." However, some concerns have been raised over the question of how far "embracing" sharia law would be compliant with the UK's obligation under human rights law.

In March 2014, the Law Society of England and Wales issued instructions on how to draft sharia-compliant wills for the network of sharia courts which has grown up in Islamic communities to deal with disputes between Muslim families, and so Williams's idea of sharia in the UK was, for a time, seen to bear fruit. The instructions were withdrawn in November 2014.

=== Comments on the British government ===
On 8 June 2011, Williams said that the British government was committing Britain to "radical, long-term policies for which no-one voted". Writing in the New Statesman magazine, Williams raised concerns about the coalition's health, education and welfare reforms. He said there was "indignation" due to a lack of "proper public argument". He also said that the "Big Society" idea was viewed with "widespread suspicion", noting also that "we are still waiting for a full and robust account of what the Left would do differently and what a Left-inspired version of localism would look like". The article also said there was concern that the government would abandon its responsibility for tackling child poverty, illiteracy and poor access to the best schools. He also expressed concern about the "quiet resurgence of the seductive language of 'deserving' and 'undeserving' poor" and the steady pressure to increase "what look like punitive responses to alleged abuses of the system". In response, David Cameron said that he "profoundly disagreed" with Williams's claim that the government was forcing through "radical policies for which no one voted". Cameron said that the government was acting in a "good and moral" fashion and defended the "Big Society" and the coalition's deficit reduction, welfare and education plans. "I am absolutely convinced that our policies are about actually giving people a greater responsibility and greater chances in their life, and I will defend those very vigorously", he said. "By all means let us have a robust debate but I can tell you, it will always be a two-sided debate."

On 26 November 2013, at Clare College, Cambridge, Williams gave the annual T. S. Eliot Lecture, with the title Eliot's Christian Society and the Current Political Crisis. In this, he recalled the poet's assertion that a competent agnostic would make a better prime minister than an incompetent Christian. "I don't know what he would make of our present prime minister", he said. "I have a suspicion that he might have approved of him. I don't find that a very comfortable thought."

=== Comments on antisemitism ===
In August 2017, Williams condemned antisemitism and backed a petition to remove the works of David Irving and other Holocaust denial books from the University of Manchester. In a letter to the university, Williams said "At a time when there is, nationally and internationally, a measurable rise in the expression of extremist views I believe this question needs urgent attention."

=== Climate and ecological crisis ===
In October 2018, he signed the call to action supporting Extinction Rebellion.

=== 2022 Russian invasion of Ukraine ===
In March 2022, following the 2022 Russian invasion of Ukraine, Williams urged senior leaders of the Russian Orthodox Church Outside Russia to call for an immediate ceasefire in Ukraine and the re-opening of diplomatic engagement. On 3 April, on BBC Radio 4's Sunday programme, Williams said there was a strong case for expelling the Russian Orthodox Church from the World Council of Churches, saying, "When a Church is actively supporting a war of aggression, failing to condemn nakedly obvious breaches of any kind of ethical conduct in wartime, then other Churches do have the right to raise the question… I am still waiting for any senior member of the Orthodox hierarchy to say that the slaughter of the innocent is condemned unequivocally by all forms of Christianity."

On 12 April 2022, Williams called for an Easter ceasefire in Ukraine. He gave his remarks in Chernivtsi, at the "Faith in Ukraine" event, organised by the Elijah Interfaith Institute and the Peace Department.

=== LGBT rights ===
In April 2022, Williams and several other UK religious leaders signed an open letter to the then-prime minister Boris Johnson, urging him to include a ban on conversion therapy targeting transgender people alongside planned legislation to ban conversion therapy targeting sexuality.

== Ecumenism ==
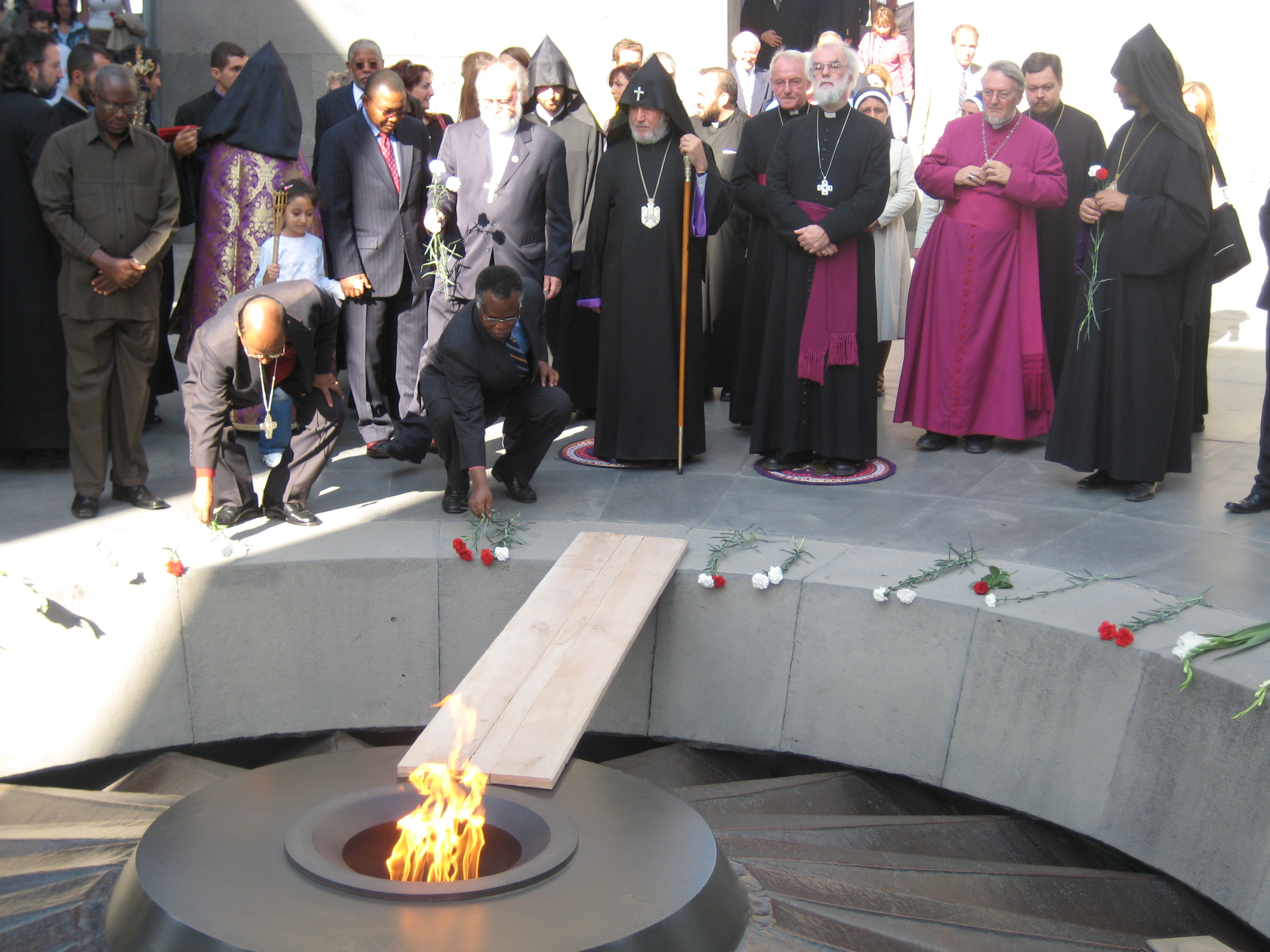
Williams and Catholicos of All Armenians Karekin II at the Armenian genocide monument in Yerevan for a torch lighting ceremony for the genocide victims in Darfur. The two men are standing on purple cloth.

Williams did his doctoral work on the mid-20th-century Russian Orthodox theologian Vladimir Lossky. He is currently patron of the Fellowship of Saint Alban and Saint Sergius, an ecumenical forum for Orthodox and Western (primarily Anglican) Christians. He has expressed his continuing sympathies with Orthodoxy in lectures and writings since that time.

Williams has written on the Spanish Catholic mystic Teresa of Ávila. On the death of Pope John Paul II, he accepted an invitation to attend his funeral, the first Archbishop of Canterbury to attend the funeral of a Pope since the break under Henry VIII. He also attended the inauguration of Pope Benedict XVI. During the Pope's state visit to the United Kingdom in September 2010, the two led a service together at Westminster Abbey.

Williams said in April 2010 that the child sexual abuse scandal in the Catholic Church in Ireland had been a "colossal trauma" for Ireland in particular. His remarks were condemned by the second most senior Catholic bishop in Ireland, the Archbishop of Dublin, Diarmuid Martin, who said that "Those working for renewal in the Catholic Church in Ireland did not need this comment on this Easter weekend and do not deserve it."

== Honours and awards ==
- Life peerage (created 8 January 2013)
- Royal Victorian Chain (2012)
- Chaplain of the Order of St John (1999)
- Knight Grand Cross of the Royal Order of Francis I (2004)
- Order of Friendship of Russia (2010)
- Sitara-e-Pakistan (2012)
- Membership in the Privy Council of the United Kingdom, 2002
- Fellow of the British Academy (FBA), 1990
- Fellow of the Royal Society of Literature (FRSL), 2003
- Founding Fellow of the Learned Society of Wales (FLSW), 2010
- Honorary doctorates: University of Kent, DD, 2003; University of Wales, DD, 2003; Evangelisch-Theologische Fakultät, University of Bonn, Dr. theol. honoris causa, 2004; University of Oxford, DCL, 2005; University of Cambridge, DD, 2006; Wycliffe College, University of Toronto, DD, 2007; Trinity College, University of Toronto, DD, 2007; Durham University, DD, 2007; Rikkyo University, DD, 2009; St. Vladimir's Orthodox Theological Seminary, DD, 2010; Katholieke Universiteit Leuven, Belgium, DD, 2011; King's College London, DD, 2011; DUniv Canterbury Christ Church University, 2012; University of South Wales, DUniv, 2013; University of Warwick, LLD, 2016; Sewanee: The University of the South, DD, 2016; Uppsala University, Sweden, teol. dr honoris causa 2017; Yale University, 2018; The General Theological Seminary, New York, D.D. 11 February 2019; Huron University College, London, Ontario, DD 18 March 2019; Berkeley Divinity School, DD honoris causa 21 February 2024.
- Honorary Student of Christ Church, Oxford
- Honorary Fellow of Wadham College, Oxford
- Honorary Fellow of Clare College, Cambridge
- Honorary Fellow of Christ's College, Cambridge
- Honorary Fellow of Glyndŵr University, Wrexham
- Honorary Fellow of St Chad's College, Durham
- Freedom of the City of Swansea, Wales: 31 July 2010.
- Freedom of the City of Canterbury, Kent: 17 November 2012.
- Freeman of the City of London, and Liveryman of the Worshipful Company of Wax Chandlers.
- In 2011, he was awarded the President's Medal by the British Academy.
- In 2015, he received an honorary doctorate of laws from the University of Bath.

In 2024, he received an honorary doctorate from the Teresianum Pontificia Facoltà Teologica Pontificio Istituto di Spiritualità, Roma.

== Arms ==
Coat of arms of Rowan Williams
Notes Williams's family arms as archbishop. Escutcheon Per Pale Gules and Azure a Chevron Ermine between three Lions Passant Guardant armed within Roundels Or all counterchanged Motto Cultus Dei Sapientia Hominis (Latin: "The worship of God is the wisdom of man") Other elements The exterior heraldic ornaments pertaining to a Church of England archbishop.

== Works ==
- The Theology of Vladimir Nikolaievich Lossky: An Exposition and Critique (1975 DPhil thesis)
- The Wound of Knowledge (Darton, Longman and Todd, 1979)
- Resurrection: Interpreting the Easter Gospel (Darton, Longman and Todd, 1982)
  - new edition (2014) ISBN 9780232530285
- Eucharistic Sacrifice: The Roots of a Metaphor (Grove Books, 1982) ISBN 9780907536321
- Essays Catholic and Radical ed. with K. Leech (Bowerdean, 1983)
- The Truce of God (London: Fount, 1983)
- Peacemaking Theology (1984)
- Open to Judgement: Sermons and Addresses (1984)
- Politics and Theological Identity (with David Nicholls) (Jubilee, 1984)
- Faith in the University (1989)
- Christianity and the Ideal of Detachment (1989)
- Teresa of Avila (1991) ISBN 0-225-66579-4
- Open to Judgement: Sermons and Addresses (Darton, Longman and Todd, 1994)
- After Silent Centuries: Poems (Perpetua Press, 1994) ISBN 9781870882101
- A Ray of Darkness (Cowley, 1995) ISBN 9781561011124
- Lost Icons: Essays on Cultural Bereavement (T & T Clark, 2000)
- On Christian Theology (2000)
- Christ on Trial (2000) ISBN 0-00-710791-9
- Arius: Heresy and Tradition (2nd ed., SCM Press, 2001) ISBN 0-334-02850-7
- The Poems of Rowan Williams (2002) ISBN 9781847774521
- Writing in the Dust: Reflections on 11 September and Its Aftermath (Hodder and Stoughton, 2002)
- Ponder These Things: Praying With Icons of the Virgin (Canterbury Press, 2002) ISBN 9781557255099
- Faith and Experience in Early Monasticism (2002)
- Silence and Honey Cakes: The Wisdom of the Desert (2003) ISBN 0-7459-5170-8)
- The Dwelling of the Light—Praying with Icons of Christ (Canterbury Press, 2003) ISBN 9780802827784
- Darkness Yielding, co-authored with Jim Cotter, Martyn Percy, Sylvia Sands and W. H. Vanstone (2004) ISBN 1-870652-36-3
- Anglican Identities (2004) ISBN 1-56101-254-8
- Why Study the Past? The Quest for the Historical Church (Eerdmans, 2005) ISBN 9780802876478
- Grace and Necessity: Reflections on Art and Love (2005) ISBN 9780819281180
- Tokens of Trust: An Introduction to Christian Belief (Canterbury Press, 2007) ISBN 9780664236991
- Wrestling with Angels: Conversations in Modern Theology, ed. Mike Higton (SCM Press, 2007) ISBN 0-334-04095-7
- Where God Happens: Discovering Christ in One Another (New Seeds, 2007) ISBN 9781590303900
- Dostoevsky: Language, Faith and Fiction (Baylor University Press, 2008); ISBN 1-84706-425-6
- Choose Life: Christmas and Easter Sermons in Canterbury Cathedral (Bloomsbury, 2009) ISBN 9781408190388
- Faith in the Public Square (Bloomsbury, 2012) ISBN 9781408187586
- The Lion's World - A Journey into the Heart of Narnia (SPCK, 2012); ISBN 9780281068951
- Meeting God in Mark (SPCK, 2014), reprinted as Meeting God in Mark: Reflections for the Season of Lent (Westminster John Knox Press, 2015) ISBN 978-0664260521
- Being Christian: Baptism, Bible, Eucharist, Prayer (Eerdmans, 2014) ISBN 9780802871978
- The Edge of Words: God and the Habits of Language (Bloomsbury, 2014) ISBN 9781472910431
- Meeting God in Paul (SPCK, 2015) ISBN 978-0281073382
- On Augustine (Bloomsbury, 2016) ISBN 9781472925275
- Being Disciples: Essentials of the Christian Life (SPCK/Eerdmans, 2016) ISBN 9780802874320
- The Tragic Imagination: The Literary Agenda (Oxford University Press, 2016) ISBN 9780198736417
- God With Us: The Meaning of the Cross and Resurrection - Then and Now (SPCK, 2017) ISBN 9780281076642
- Holy Living: The Christian Tradition for Today (Bloomsbury, 2017) ISBN 9781472946089
- Christ the Heart of Creation (Bloomsbury, 2018) ISBN 9781472945549
- Being Human: Bodies, Minds, Persons (SPCK, 2018) ISBN 9780802876560
- Luminaries: Twenty Lives that Illuminate the Christian Way (SPCK, 2019) ISBN 9780281082957
- The Book of Taliesin (translation and introductions with Gwyneth Lewis; Penguin, 2019) ISBN 9780141396934
- The Way of St Benedict (Bloomsbury, 2020) ISBN 9781472973078
- Looking East in Winter: Contemporary Thought and the Eastern Christian Tradition (Bloomsbury, 2021) ISBN 9781472989246
- A Century of Poetry 100 poems for searching the heart (SPCK, 2022) ISBN 9780281085521
- Passions of the Soul (Bloomsbury, 2024) ISBN 9781399415682
- Discovering Christianity: A Guide for the Curious (SPCK, 2025) ISBN 9780281090631
- Solidarity: The Work of Recognition (Bloomsbury Continuum, 2026) ISBN 9781399431514

=== Forewords and afterwords ===
- Foreword to W. H. Auden in Great Poets of the 20th century series, The Guardian, 12 March 2008.
- Rowan Williams (2019). "Afterword". In Extinction Rebellion (ed.). This Is Not a Drill: An Extinction Rebellion Handbook. Penguin Books. pp. 181–184. ISBN 9780141991443.
- Foreword in God’s Biker: Motorcycles and Misfits, by Sean Stillman. (SPCK, 2018) ISBN 978-0281079421

== See also ==
- Cultural bereavement

Church in Wales titles
Preceded by Clifford Wright	Bishop of Monmouth; 1992–2002	Succeeded by Dominic Walker
Preceded by Alwyn Rice Jones	Archbishop of Wales; 1999–2002	Succeeded by Barry Morgan
Church of England titles
Preceded by George Carey	Archbishop of Canterbury; 2002–2012	Succeeded by Justin Welby
Academic offices
Preceded by John Macquarrie	Lady Margaret Professor of Divinity; 1986–1991	Succeeded by John Webster
Preceded by Duncan Robinson	Master of Magdalene College, Cambridge; 2013–2020	Succeeded by Christopher Greenwood
