= Hiraeth =

Welsh term for homesickness for Wales

Hiraeth (Welsh pronunciation: [hɪraɨ̯θ, hiːrai̯θ]) is a Welsh word for a type of longing or homesickness for Wales, particularly with a nostalgic character.

== Etymology ==
Derived from hir 'long' and -aeth (a nominal suffix creating an abstract noun from an adjective), the word is literally equivalent to English 'longing'. A less likely, but possible, etymology is hir 'long' + aeth 'pain, grief, sorrow, longing'. In the earliest citations in early Welsh poetry it implies 'grief or longing after the loss or death of someone'.

== Culture ==
Nineteenth-century attempts to spread the English language through its exclusive use in schools at the expense of the Welsh language, following the 1847 Reports of the Commissioners of Inquiry into the State of Education in Wales (commonly known as the "Treachery of the Blue Books" in Wales), led to an increase in hiraeth. Between 1870 and 1914, approximately 40% of Welsh emigrants returned to Wales, a much higher percentage than the rest of Britain, and it has been claimed that this was due to hiraeth.

== See also ==
- Heimat
- Saudade
- Ḥuzn
- Solastalgia
- Cultural bereavement
