= United Nations Security Council Resolution 1611 =

United Nations Security Council resolution

UN Security Council Resolution 1611
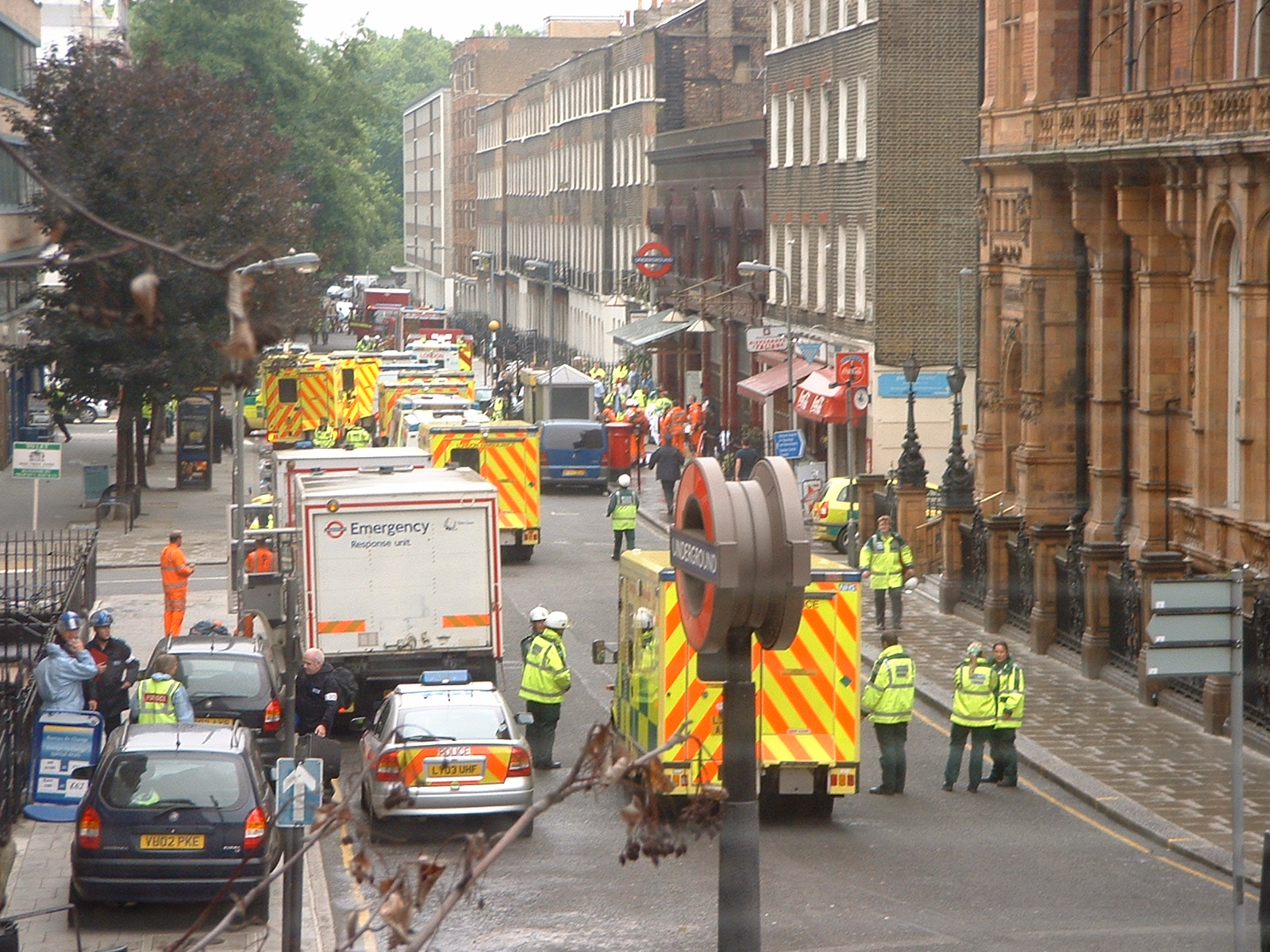
- Scene of one of the attacks in Russell Square
- Date: 7 July 2005
- Meeting no.: 5,223
- Code: S/RES/1611 (Document)
- Subject: Threats to international peace and security caused by terrorist acts
- Voting summary: 15 voted for; None voted against; None abstained
- Result: Adopted

Security Council composition
- Permanent members: China; France; Russia; United Kingdom; United States
- Non-permanent members: Algeria; Argentina; Benin; Brazil; Denmark; Greece; Japan; Philippines; Romania; Tanzania

United Nations Security Council resolution 1611, adopted unanimously on 7 July 2005, after reaffirming the principles of the United Nations Charter and resolutions 1373 (2001) and 1566 (2004), the Council condemned the 7 July 2005 London bombings.

The Security Council reaffirmed the need to combat threats to international peace and security caused by terrorist acts and condemned the bomb attacks in London, in which there were many injuries and deaths. It expressed sympathy and condolences to the families of the victims and the people and government of the United Kingdom.

The resolution called upon all states to co-operate to bring the perpetrators to justice in accordance with their obligations under Resolution 1373. Finally, the Council concluded by expressing its determination to combat all forms of terrorism.

== See also ==
- List of terrorist incidents
- List of United Nations Security Council Resolutions 1601 to 1700 (2005–2006)
- Response to the 2005 London bombings
