= Lost Icons: Reflections on Cultural Bereavement =

Work by Rowan Williams

- Author: Rowan Williams
- Language: English
- Subject: Cultural bereavement, cultural continuity
- Genre: Non-fiction
- Published: 2000
- Publisher: Morehouse (Bloomsbury Publishing)
- Publication place: United Kingdom
- Pages: 200
- ISBN: 9780819219480

Lost Icons: Reflections on Cultural Bereavement (later Lost Icons: Essays on Cultural Bereavement) is a 2000 collection of essays by theologian Rowan Williams.

== Content ==
The work deals with the loss of traditions, which he terms "icons", in exchange for short term fads, "fashions", mainly in the United Kingdom. In the view of Williams this change of societal values results in cultural bereavement. He is particularly focused on childhood.

== Reception ==
Mark Allen McIntosh writing for Spiritus was positive towards the book, naming one of its greatest strengths as "its irreducibly social and political vision". Theology Today likewise praised it, stating that it is a rare example of a work that is in touch with both "Christian theology and contemporary culture, politics, education, and spirituality". Richard Chartres of The Journal of Theological Studies lauded it for its willingness to engage in conversation with those who hold opposing views. The writer for Scottish Journal of Theology was overall positive towards Williams work but disagreed with some of his conclusions, arguing that society has not lost as much as Williams believes.
