= Reactions to the 2005 London bombings =

Responses to the 2005 London bombings

The 7 July 2005 London bombings were a series of suicide attacks carried out by homegrown terrorists on London's public transport network during the morning rush hour.

The bombings, three on the London Underground and one on a bus, killed 52 people and prompted a massive response from the emergency services, and in the immediate aftermath the almost-complete shut down of the city's transport system. Over the following hours and days there were several security alerts throughout the United Kingdom, and in some foreign cities. London largely returned to normality in the following days, though with several further security alerts and a reduced service on the Underground.

== Security alerts ==
=== Security responses in the UK ===
==== London ====
- Cabinet Office Briefing Room A (COBRA) was activated within minutes of the first reports of explosions, and remained open round the clock for over a week.
- The London Underground was closed in the hours following the attacks, and did not re-open until the following day, with a reduced service. The Circle line, and the Piccadilly line between Hyde Park Corner and Holloway Road, remained closed. Several other lines remained disrupted in the areas affected. Security alerts were also causing disruption.
- The entire London Buses network was suspended on 7 July, with all buses sent back to depot for security checks. Eventually, services outside Zone 1 in central London returned to operations, and a reduced Zone 1 service operated in the evening of 7 July. Services returned to normal on 8 July, except through affected areas.
- All major Network Rail stations in London closed on the morning of 7 July, re-opening in late afternoon. King's Cross remained closed until 8 July. Most National Rail services terminated outside London, with Great North Eastern Railway trains stopping at Peterborough and Virgin Trains West Coast stopping at Watford Junction.
- The London Ambulance Service reported that they would "only be sending ambulances to patients across the capital with life-threatening illnesses or injuries".
- The Metropolitan Police Service urged people not to enter London, and to limit their usage of public transport.
- Schools in the capital did not close on 7 July, as police thought it safer for children to remain in classes. On 8 July, most schools in central London were closed due to transport difficulties.
- In London, security responses saw major buildings such as the Houses of Parliament and Buckingham Palace sealed off. Most landmarks such as the London Eye and Westminster Abbey were closed. All theatre productions in the West End were cancelled, as were several concerts. The Bank of England commenced financial continuity plans, to keep the financial system operational.
- East Croydon station was closed due to a suspect package, but was later re-opened. There were reports of Victoria station being cordoned off by police amid reports of a "suspicious package" on a bus near the station.

==== Nationwide ====
- Security alerts were reported in Edinburgh, Cardiff, Birmingham, Sheffield, Southampton, Portsmouth, Swindon, Brighton and Poole.
- In Edinburgh, two controlled explosions were carried out on a Lothian Buses double-decker on Princes Street in the centre of Edinburgh at around 17:30; neither of the objects destroyed contained explosives.
- In Cardiff, the Central railway and Central bus stations were closed after a security alert.
- In Birmingham, 20,000 people were evacuated from the city centre on 9 July while police carried out four controlled explosions.
- There were bomb scares in Sheffield City Centre on 5 July.
- In Southampton, the main coach station and the surrounding area was cordoned off after a suspect package.
- In Portsmouth the Portsmouth Harbour railway station and the nearby Hard bus interchange were closed for a few hours following a hoax bomb threat. Ian Tebbut was subsequently jailed for 6 months.
- In Swindon, a suspicious package was spotted at the town's station. The area was evacuated and bomb disposal experts carried out a controlled explosion, but the parcel was found to contain two gifts and a bag of washing.
- In Brighton there was a controlled explosion of a suspicious briefcase at approximately 12:55 in a telephone box outside Brighton station. The briefcase was later found to be harmless, and the station was re-opened.
- Poole railway station was also closed in response to the discovery of a suspicious package. The package was later detonated by police in a controlled explosion.
- At the G8 summit in Gleneagles, armed police patrolled the surrounding villages, and over 1,000 Metropolitan Police officers were re-deployed back to London.

=== Security responses abroad ===
- In other European countries, security was also tightened at major transport networks.
- Prime Minister of France Dominique de Villepin announced that France had increased its level of terror alert to red, the second-highest level, in response to the events in London.
- Meanwhile, Berlin transport officials indicated that security alert levels for the public transport system of the German capital had been raised to yellow, the second of four levels.
- Spanish Interior Minister José Antonio Alonso raised the level of antiterrorist prevention and protection alert to level three, the highest level. This implied the use of all security forces in the country patrolling public transports and others mass confluence sites. For example, military forces patrolled in commuter trains in Madrid.
- Transportation security was also tightened in Canada, particularly in the Toronto Subway and the Montreal Metro.
- In Singapore, where a major presence of British, American and Australian interests are located, security measures were enforced immediately on the public transport system. Armed police officers from the Special Operations Command began patrols at MRT stations, plans for CCTVs to be installed in all trains and buses were mooted, and the public was also updated on the progress of the planned MRT Security Unit of the Singapore Police Force. Security was also stepped up at the then on-going 117th IOC Session.
- In Singapore, Liu Tze Yuen was behind Hougang bomb hoax on 7 July 2005 and 12 August 2005. Lin Zhenghang was arrested for posting bomb hoax at Toa Payoh Bus Interchange which is similar to the 2005 London bombings on 11 February 2007.
- In the United States, the Department of Homeland Security raised the terror alert level to orange, specifically for mass transit in large cities. In Seattle, to name just one example of a major American city in which security on public transit was increased after the London bombings, Seattle police and King County sheriffs patrolled at each stop in the downtown Downtown Seattle Transit Tunnel.
- In Denmark, at least two controlled explosions were carried out in the week after the incident. Both incidents turned out to be left luggage. One of these controlled explosions took place on 11 July at Amalienborg Palace, the residence of the Royal Family. Generally, police patrol activity in public transportation areas was increased significantly after the incident.
- On 11 July it became known that commanders at US airbases in East Anglia had issued orders immediately after the bombings forbidding servicemen from travelling within the M25 motorway until further notice, and strongly discouraged family members not subject to their orders from doing so. The orders were revoked by higher authority on 12 July once they became generally known.

== Media response ==
The first indication of the attacks came at 9:15 a.m., when Sky News, during its Sunrise breakfast show, flashed a report of an explosion at Liverpool Street Station in the City of London. The main UK TV networks (BBC One and ITV) dropped programming and carried news solidly within 30 minutes of the first reports. Initially, the BBC's response was slow. At 9:20 a.m., a graphic appeared on BBC News 24 reporting an explosion in the City of London, only for it to be removed and go unmentioned by the channel's presenters for a further five minutes. Around this time, BBC One made a short news report before Homes Under the Hammer, only to interrupt the programme several minutes later when the gravity of the incident became clearer. The major television channels' coverage continued throughout the day with simulcasts of the channels' respective rolling news services BBC News 24 and the ITV News Channel. The length of this media coverage in the UK was unprecedented: for example it was the single longest broadcast in ITN's history. There was total blanket coverage on all British rolling news channels for several days.

Radio stations toned down their programming with extended news and information throughout the day. BBC Radio 4 took rolling news programming from BBC Radio 5 Live during the morning. GCap Media's London music radio stations – Capital Radio, Capital Gold, Choice FM and Xfm – simulcast rolling news coverage from the time the first reports came in. This coverage, aimed at Londoners struggling to get home or to work in the aftermath of the attacks, was much acclaimed within the industry and won the coveted Sony Gold Award.

BBC Radio 4 pulled its scheduled Classic Serial without explanation; it was to have been John Buchan's Greenmantle, about the revolt of Muslims against British interests abroad. ITV cancelled a broadcast of the film The X-Files at midnight on 9 July, which featured an explosion at a U.S government building caused by a bomb. Another film, Stakeout, was shown instead. The following evening, the terrorism-themed action film The Siege, originally scheduled for a 10:15 p.m. broadcast on ITV1, was replaced by Gone in 60 Seconds. Similarly, in Denmark Blown Away featuring Tommy Lee Jones as a bomber was replaced on national TV station Danmarks Radio by Rain Man. Five postponed the showing of the CSI fifth-season finale by a week because it featured a suicide bomber. It was replaced with a repeat from an earlier season. Sky One replaced the advertised episode of their documentary series Conspiracies on 10 July. The planned episode was due to focus on the Lockerbie bombing. It was replaced with an episode that focused on the Siege of Waco instead. Meanwhile, the network removed references to terrorism when broadcasting an episode of WWE SmackDown!. The episode was taped two days before the attacks. (However, this episode, in which The Undertaker was the subject of a mock attack by two Muslim wrestlers, was shown unedited in the United States, to the chagrin of many viewers and critics.)

BBC Two's topical news quiz Mock the Week was cancelled – the episode had been the last one of the show's first series and was replaced instead by a clip show showing edited highlights and outtakes from previous episodes in the show's run. Channel 4's comic panel game 8 out of 10 Cats was edited to remove a section of the show in which the panellists discussed which news stories the public had been discussing that week, and that portion remained absent from most of the rest of the series.

BBC Radio 1's programming proceeded as normal throughout the day but with regular reports and updates both from the incumbent DJs and the Newsbeat team generally including listener feedback on the transport situation. Scott Mills at the time usually had an afternoon slot but was standing in that morning for Chris Moyles' Breakfast Show (Moyles was on holiday), with Vernon Kay in turn due to stand in for Mills in the evening. Due to the transport disruption Kay was unable to make it into the studio and Mills (also unable to travel out from the studio) filled in his usual evening slot. He managed to speak to Kay on the phone, who assured listeners that he was OK and just stuck somewhere. Finally due to high listener demand (he claimed) Mills rounded off this show with "Tubthumping" by Chumbawamba. The lyrics "I get knocked down, but I get up again, you're never gonna keep me down" were meant to represent the defiant attitude of the tuned-in listeners.

The bbc.co.uk website recorded an all time bandwidth peak of 11Gbit/s at 12:00 on 7 July. BBC News received some 1 billion total hits on the day of the event (including all images, text and HTML), serving some 5.5 terabytes of data.

Press photographs of a victim of the attacks being assisted by former firefighter Paul Dadge became iconic of the attacks.

R.E.M.'s concert in Hyde Park, scheduled for 9 July, was postponed until 16 July. Queens of the Stone Age were also obliged to call off their 7 July show at Somerset House.

=== Opinion and reaction ===
In The Guardian Tariq Ali and Robert Fisk in The Independent, echoing earlier comments by George Galloway in parliament, claimed that the Iraq War was the cause of the attacks, though both also ran opinion pages and letters responding that such claims were too oversimplified, and the general mood of the press was that Britain was always a terrorist target and at most the war made Britain a more prominent target.

The American Fox News network was criticised for its response to the news. Brian Kilmeade claimed that the attacks worked to the advantage of conservatives, putting terrorism back on the political agenda at a time when the G8 were discussing climate change and poverty. Washington managing editor, Brit Hume, claimed his first response to the news was that it was "time to buy", referring to the stock market, and host John Gibson quipped that if the International Olympic Committee "picked France instead of London to hold the Olympics, it would have been the one time we could look forward to where we didn't worry about terrorism. [Terrorists would] blow up Paris, and who cares?"

== Legislative reaction ==
On 19 July 2005, the Home Secretary Charles Clarke announced in parliament the fast-tracking of a trimmed-down anti-terror bill, for which cross-party support had been secured, to become law by the end of the year. The new law would make criminal 'acts preparatory to terrorism' (possibly to include the accessing of any websites offering knowledge of terror tactics and bomb-making information), seeking or providing terrorist training domestically or overseas, and 'indirect incitement to terrorism'.

This law became the Terrorism Act 2006, which despite broad cross-party support for many of the new offences legislated, created controversy due to the government's desire to introduce 90-day detention, though this was later reduced to 28 days.

== Community responses and remembrance services ==
Within hours of the explosions, several websites were established including You Will Fail, which celebrated Mayor of London Ken Livingstone's defiant words and We're Not Afraid, inviting all people to express their resolution not to be 'afraid, intimidated or cowed by the cowardly act of terrorism'. The theme of the latter site was to post a picture of individuals or groups holding a note with the words 'We are not afraid'. While initially intended for Londoners, the site was soon receiving supporting messages worldwide.

On Sunday 17 July around 1,000 people joined a 'peace' vigil in Russell Square called by the Stop the War Coalition (StWC) and the Muslim Association of Britain. Speaking at the rally the StWC national convenor Lindsey German condemned the bombings but added that "The only way to end the bombings is to withdraw from Afghanistan, Iraq and Palestine. When we have justice around the world we will have peace as well." The StWC also participated in vigils across the country.

== Speeches and offerings of condolence ==
=== 7 July 2005 London bombings ===
==== United Kingdom ====
===== Royal Family =====
- Queen Elizabeth II issued an official statement, saying "I know I speak for the whole nation in expressing my sympathy to all those affected and the relatives of the killed and injured. I have nothing but admiration for the emergency services as they go about their work". On 8 July, Queen Elizabeth II visited the Royal London Hospital, near Liverpool Street, where she visited some of the victims of the attacks, and emergency staff who responded to the attacks. She later made a speech described by the BBC as "unusually forthright", in which she called the bombings an outrage, and said that "those who perpetrate these brutal acts against innocent people should know that they will not change our way of life". On 10 July, Queen Elizabeth II again commented on the attacks, during the UK's commemoration services for the 60th anniversary of World War II. The Queen also ordered that the Union Flag on Buckingham Palace fly at half-mast.
- Charles, Prince of Wales and Camilla, Duchess of Cornwall visited St Mary's Hospital in Paddington on 8 July. The Prince said "It's been one of the things that many of us have dreaded for a long time and now they have finally got through," and added, "What I can never get over is the incredible resilience of the British people who have set us all a fantastic example of how to react to these kinds of tragedies." The Duchess also commented "It makes me very proud to be British" in response to the efforts of the emergency services.
- Prince William of Wales, on tour in New Zealand with the British and Irish Lions said, "At this time I'm sure that I'm joined by New Zealanders and Lions supporters alike in extending to the families and loved ones of all those directly involved, my heartfelt sympathies".
- Prince Andrew, Duke of York visited the Transport for London staff and the Metropolitan Police at CentreComm, the London Buses Command and Control Complex in Buckingham Palace Road on 8 July. The Duke met staff who co-ordinated the transport network in London following the attacks, and praised Londoners for their reactions, saying "The way that Londoners pulled together yesterday was quite extraordinary".
- Prince Richard and Birgitte, Duke and Duchess of Gloucester visited the Chelsea and Westminster Hospital on 9 July to meet victims of the attack and to thank staff.

===== Scottish, Northern Irish and Welsh responses =====
- First Minister of Scotland Jack McConnell issued a statement in behalf of the Scottish Executive saying, "I had planned today (Thursday) to have a conversation with Mayor Ken Livingstone to congratulate him on the success for London yesterday in Singapore in winning the Olympic Games for 2012. Instead I have sent a message of condolence on behalf of the people of Scotland to the people of London and the families of those who have been injured or deceased in the terrorist atrocities that were seen in different locations in central London today".
- First Minister of Wales Rhodri Morgan issued a statement on behalf of the National Assembly for Wales, saying, "The whole of Wales will feel nothing but revulsion at these savage acts of terrorism targeted at commuters during London's busy rush hour. On behalf of the people of Wales, I would like to express my deepest sympathies to the relatives of those killed and injured in this morning's attacks".
- The four major political parties in Northern Ireland condemned the attacks. William McCrea spoke on behalf of the Democratic Unionist Party saying "I sympathise with those who have been bereaved as a result of this terrible atrocity and our thoughts are with the many families who have been so cruelly robbed of their loved ones". The DUP also used their statement to attack Sinn Féin and the IRA, whom they accused of "planting more bombs in London than anyone else". Sinn Féin also condemned the attacks, with the Mayor of Moyle District Council, saying "On behalf of Sinn Féin I offer my sincere condolences to the victims and the families of those killed and injured and to the people of London".

===== Greater London =====
- Mayor of London Ken Livingstone delivered a message of defiance on behalf of the people of London, speaking directly to the bombers and their sponsors and saying that "That isn't an ideology, it isn't even a perverted faith, it is just indiscriminate attempt at mass murder". He also addressed the bombers, saying that people "flee you because you tell them how they should live. They don't want that and nothing you do, however many of us you kill, will stop that flight to our cities where freedom is strong and where people can live in harmony with one another. Whatever you do, however many you kill, you will fail".

==== Multinational bodies ====
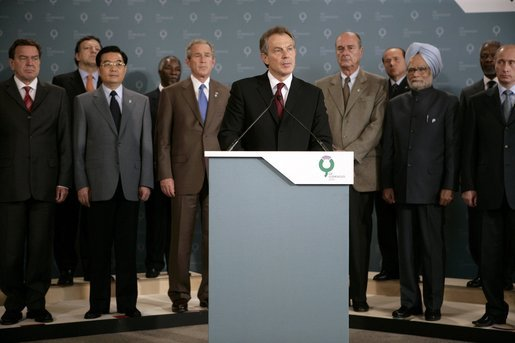
Prime Minister Tony Blair, flanked by the G8 leaders, reads a statement on their behalf condemning the attacks in London

- European Union: The European Parliament held a minute of silence to mourn the victims of the explosions.
- Commonwealth of Nations Secretary-General Don McKinnon issued a statement saying, "All of us throughout the Commonwealth family are shocked by these barbaric and cowardly attacks. Our thoughts go to all the victims and their families and friends. Terrorism cannot be allowed to succeed. The Commonwealth has spoken out loudly and clearly against this scourge. The killing and maiming of innocent men, women and children is unjustifiable".
- G8 leaders prepared a statement, read on behalf of them all by Tony Blair, condemning the attacks as "an attack on civilised peoples everywhere", and saying that the G8 summit would proceed.
- (Cooperation Council for the Arab States of the Gulf) The Gulf Co-operation Council "condemns the terrorist attacks which hit the British capital in several locations this morning".
- At NATO headquarters in Brussels, the North Atlantic Council met for an extraordinary session, and issued a statement saying "The Council condemned in the strongest possible terms terrorism in all its forms. NATO Allies reaffirmed their determination to combat this scourge, and to defend with all means at their disposal the Alliance's values of freedom, tolerance and democracy".
- The International Olympic Committee stated that "The IOC was appalled by the barbaric attack". The IOC also confirmed that the attacks would not affect London's successful Olympic bid for the 2012 Summer Olympics, stating "Security is one of the 17 themes of evaluating the Olympics and we have full confidence in the London authorities for a secure Olympic Games".
- : United Nations Secretary-General Kofi Annan described the bombings as "an attack on humanity itself", and joined other world leaders in condemning the attacks. He said that he was personally "devastated" by the events.
- The Security Council condemned "without reservation" the terror attacks and urged nations to prosecute perpetrators of such "barbaric acts." In a resolution adopted by a 15–0 vote in an emergency meeting, the Council expressed condolences to the victims of the bomb blasts.

==== International responses ====
===== Africa =====
- Morocco – Communication Minister Nabil Benabdallah gave a statement on behalf of the government, saying that "these heinous attacks underline the need for the international community to...unite its efforts to fight these acts and abort their objectives".
- Egypt – Foreign Trade and Industry Minister Rachid Mohamed Rachid, who lived in London until his appointment in 2004, condemned the attacks while at a conference in Brussels. "Everyone is following what's happening in London with great anxiety. It is important to be brave in facing up to the scourge of terrorism," the state news agency MENA quoted him as saying.
- Sahrawi Arab Democratic Republic – President of the Sahrawi Republic, Mohamed Abdelaziz expressed his condolences on behalf of the Saharawi people to the British people and government, vehemently condemning "the terrorist acts" that stroked the British capital.
- Saint Helena – Governor of Saint Helena, Michael Clancy said "On behalf of the people of Saint Helena, Ascension and Tristan Da Cunha I convey our sympathy to those who have suffered injury or trauma as a result of yesterday's tragic events in London. We send our sincere condolences to the families of those who have lost their lives. While we are thousands of miles away, we feel very close to the people of Britain in spirit, and we know that they will respond with resolve and determination".
- South Africa – President Thabo Mbeki has condemned the series of explosions on London's transport system: "As South Africa, we join the rest of the international community in condemning any acts of terrorism".

===== Americas =====
- Argentina – President Néstor Kirchner sent a press release that stated "We're convinced that the respect to life is the pillar of the democratic coexistence, and manifest our total condemn of any kind of terrorist act, such as the one suffered by the British citizenship, and hope for the people responsible to be apprehended and submitted to justice. The Argentine people feels deeply identified with the victims and their relatives, to whom we would like to express our deepest sentiments of consternation and solidarity."
- Brazil – President Luiz Inácio Lula da Silva said that "Brazil expresses its harshest condemnation of this most recent, deplorable terrorist act" and voiced "solidarity with the suffering of the victims' families".
- Canada – The Governor General of Canada, Adrienne Clarkson, said in a statement, "The world has once again witnessed the horrors of terrorism and we have all been shaken by these shocking and terrifying events. All Canadians are saddened to see this tragedy unfold and we give the people of Britain our heartfelt sympathy".
  - Prime Minister Paul Martin offered his condolences to the families of the victims of the bombings also calling the bombings "an unspeakable attack on the innocent and on a way of life," as well as "our collective freedom has come under attack by those who would use violence and murder to force extremism on the world". Martin also requested Canadian flags on all federal buildings be lowered to half-staff.
  - Deputy Prime Minister Anne McLellan said,"Acts of terrorism are completely without conscience...terrorism is a scourge on our civilisation. Those who commit the acts do not care whom they kill or how much damage they inflict on those who are truly innocent".
  - Conservative Party leader Stephen Harper said,"We should not be under any illusion that we couldn't just as easily be a target, and certainly, obviously, we could be a basis from which terror could be launched", and "those who oppose the war in Iraq also oppose the war in Afghanistan, and Canada is very involved in that".
  - New Democratic Party leader Jack Layton felt,"repulsed by the violence we have witnessed today in London...we will not allow it to undermine Canadian society, our institutions or our beliefs in democracy, human rights, tolerance, and equality. Indeed, we must go forward today with greater determination to build a world that embraces these ideals".
- Chile – President Ricardo Lagos said that "every Chilean repudiates what has happened today at dawn in London".
- Cuba – President Fidel Castro wrote, in a letter to the Queen, "I can assure you that the Cuban people, who have been a victim of terrorism for more than four decades, share your grief and condemn this unjustifiable attack on the British people".
- Falkland Islands – Governor Howard Pearce sent a message of condolence to Elizabeth II, saying, "The people of the Falkland Islands are deeply shocked and outraged by the appalling attacks which took place in London earlier today. On behalf of all Falkland Islanders, I convey our sympathy to those who have suffered injury or trauma as a result of these events and our deepest condolences to the families of those who have lost their lives. While we may be many thousands of miles away in distance, we feel very close to all Londoners in spirit, and we know that they will respond with courage and fortitude".
- Mexico – A spokesman for President Vicente Fox said that "on behalf of the people of Mexico, the president would like to express his solidarity and support to the people and government of the United Kingdom, terrorism and violence against civilian population have no possible justification, President Vicente Fox has already given his condolences to Prime Minister Blair".
- Panama – President Martín Torrijos visited the British ambassador to Panama, James Ian Malcom, to express condolences and solidarity with the UK.
- USA – President George W. Bush spoke at the 31st G8 summit in Scotland, saying "I spent some time recently with the Prime Minister, Tony Blair, and had an opportunity to express our heartfelt condolences to the people of London, people who lost lives. I appreciate Prime Minister Blair's steadfast determination and his strength. He's on his way now to London here from the G8 to speak directly to the people of London. He'll carry a message of solidarity with him".
  - Secretary of Defense Donald Rumsfeld has said: "Before long, I suspect that those responsible for these acts will encounter British steel. Their kind of steel has an uncommon strength. It does not bend or break. The British have learned from history that this kind of evil must be confronted. It cannot be appeased. Our two countries understand well that once a people give in to terrorists' demands, whatever they are, their demands will grow. The British people are determined and resolute. And I know the people of the United States are proud to stand at their side".
  - Democratic Party Chairman Howard Dean stated, "I join all Americans today in offering my condolences to the victims of today's vicious terrorist attacks in London. Our thoughts and prayers are with the victims, their friends and their families. We remain steadfast in our commitment to defeating those who threaten our freedom and values. At a time when world leaders were working together to help make our world a better place, these terrorists were plotting to disrupt that effort by killing and injuring innocent people. We will continue to stand with our allies around the world to defeat terrorism and protect our liberty and freedom".

===== Asia =====
- Bangladesh – Prime Minister Begum Khaleda Zia within hours of the attacks condemned the act of terrorism and expressed deep sorrow upon the deaths in the attacks. Foreign Minister M. Morshed Khan later visited the British High Commissioner Anwar Choudhury to convey the condemnation of the Government of Bangladesh upon the attacks.
- India – Speaking at the G8 summit in Scotland, Prime Minister Manmohan Singh said, "Just a couple of days back, India faced a major terrorist attack and these incidents show that global terrorism does not recognise international boundaries and we all need to work together to counter it".
- Indonesia – Foreign Ministry spokesman Marty Natalegawa has said, "We're shocked to hear the bombing attacks. We condemned them," He also expressed condolences to the victims and their relatives, and pray for the wounded for their early recovery.
- Japan – Prime Minister Junichiro Koizumi has said, "This terrorist action will never be forgiven, but remembered with great indignation. I offer Mr. Blair my full support to his response, and will gladly cooperate in any way possible".
- Malaysia – Prime Minister Abdullah Ahmad Badawi said all Malaysians were saddened and distressed over the bomb attacks in London. He said every Malaysian hates violence and condemns it because violence is not the solution. He stated "I believe all countries and races condemn what had happened in London although we do not know yet who is responsible for the bombing".
- Pakistan – Information Minister Sheikh Rashid said "We offer our heartfelt sympathies to those who suffered due to such acts".
- People's Republic of China – Foreign Ministry spokesman Liu Jianchao has said that "China is shocked" by this tragedy and "strongly condemns" any terrorist attacks targeted at civilians.
  - Hong Kong – Chief Executive Donald Tsang said he was shocked and saddened by what has happened. He felt aggrieved, and had spoken to the Consul General of the United Kingdom in Hong Kong to convey condolences, saying that British nationals in Hong Kong would be protected. He added the government was not complacent, although Hong Kong is a low-risk area. Security arrangements were upgraded. The market had good foundations and fundamentals. Secretary for Security Ambrose Lee also condemned terrorist attack. Necessary assistance was provided to Hong Kong people in the United Kingdom.
- Philippines – President Gloria Macapagal Arroyo and Foreign Secretary Alberto Romulo offered condolences to the families of the victims.
- Singapore – Prime Minister Lee Hsien Loong condemned the terrorist attacks in London and expressed Singapore's sympathy to the victims of the attacks and their families, and to the British people and government.

===== Europe =====
- Cyprus – President Tassos Papadopoulos stressed that "the Government and the people of Cyprus strongly condemn such horrendous acts of terror and stand in full solidarity with the British people and the rest of the international community in the fight against terrorism of all kinds".
- Czech Republic – President Václav Klaus wrote in a statement to the Queen: "We are jointly facing those who would like to destroy the values upon which our civilisation rests by their coward inhuman acts." "Along with you, we are determined not to yield to the forces which are seeking to destroy everything in which we believe through violence," Klaus wrote in the letter, in which he voiced his deepest sympathies.
- Denmark – Prime Minister Anders Fogh Rasmussen stated: "Again we're witnessing scruples' and barbaric attacks against completely innocent people – civilians, women and children... Terrorists use fear and terror as political pressure. We can't – and will not allow that. We shall never give in to terrorists."
- Finland – president Tarja Halonen expressed condolences in a letter to the Queen. In it she said "It is with profound sadness that we in Finland have received the news of the fatal bomb explosions in London, in which precious human lives were lost and many seriously injured". Foreign Minister Erkki Tuomioja also expressed condolences, stating: "I vehemently condemn these shocking and cruel acts".
- France – president Jacques Chirac, describing the attackers as "savages" said that "these attacks have without any doubt reinforced the solidarity between the eight [heads of government]" at The G8 summit, adding that the attacks would also strengthen the fight against terrorism.
  - Prime Minister Dominique de Villepin called the attack "a tragedy for Great Britain" and "a tragedy for Europe as a whole which had already been hit in Madrid in March 2004." In a letter to Prime Minister Tony Blair, De Villepin also offered "immediate, full and total collaboration of French services in helping you identify the authors of these crimes".
- Germany – Chancellor Gerhard Schröder called the attacks "cowardly and perfidious", while Foreign Minister Joschka Fischer declared his "unswerving solidarity" with London.
- Gibraltar – Chief Minister Peter Caruana, sent a message of condolence to the Queen, saying "Please accept the sympathy and solidarity of the people and Government of Gibraltar in the face of these cowardly and wicked attacks on London and its people. Please accept our condolences on the loss of life".
- Greece – Prime Minister Kostas Karamanlis stated "On the part of the government and the Greek people, I would like to express my deepest condolences" and added "Our thoughts are with the families of the victims".
- Hungary – Prime Minister Ferenc Gyurcsány called the attacks "lowly and inhuman", and expressed his "sincere sympathy" with the families of victims and with the inhabitants of London. Outgoing President Ferenc Mádl likewise condemned the attacks and expressed his condolences.
- Iceland – president Ólafur Ragnar Grímsson, says that terrorist attacks have paralysed the city. "The British nation has shown great courage and is resolved to deny the terrorists success in their attack on the open and free society".
  - Prime Minister Halldór Ásgrímsson said it is the duty of all countries to stand together in the fight against the forces that organise attacks like the 7/7 bombings. He said that counter-terrorist preparations and surveillance would increase in European countries in the wake of the attacks, including Iceland.
- (Republic of Ireland) Ireland – Taoiseach Bertie Ahern said that "after yesterday's outpouring of great joy, today is a tragic and difficult day for London." Mary McAleese, then President of Ireland also offered her condolences in a statement released from Áras an Uachtaráin.
- Netherlands – Prime Minister Jan Peter Balkenende stated: "Continuous intensive attention is required in the war against terrorism. Terrorism is an evil that can hit each European country. Cooperation in the EU and worldwide is crucial to counter this evil".
- Norway – King Harald V sent a message to The Queen saying "It was with great sorrow I received the shocking news about the horrible incidents that happened in London this morning, that have injured and claimed the lives of innocent humans".
  - Prime Minister Kjell Magne Bondevik said "On behalf of the Norwegian Government, I wish to express my deepest condolences and sympathy. My thoughts are with all those who were injured and the bereaved families, and with the people of the United Kingdom. We are mourning with you in this time of grief".
- Poland – The Polish Parliament, Sejm lower house observed a moment of silence as 3 Polish nationals were killed in the bombings and the kids channel MiniMini+, known as MiniMini back then until 2011, stopped programming for a moment of silence, with the grey version of the logo being on the screen.
- Portugal – Prime Minister José Sócrates said in a statement made from the national Parliament "The terrorist threat is global and demands for a global response. If any doubt would existed about the priorities of Europe, this dramatic attack obliges all the 25 European Union states to stay together in this fight".
- Romania – President Traian Băsescu expressed his solidarity with the British people and authorities.
- Russia – President Vladimir Putin expressed his condolences over the attacks and called on all countries to unite in the fight against international terrorism.
- Spain – Prime Minister José Luis Rodríguez Zapatero has stated "I want to express the condolences of the Government and the Spanish people to relatives of the victims of this horrible attacks. I absolutely share the sentiments stated by my colleague Tony Blair. Moral strength of democracy is far superior than such vile and cowardly methods of terrorism".
- Sweden – Prime Minister Göran Persson stated: "It is an attack on our open society. It's an attack on a democracy that's hosting a meeting to discuss such difficult issues as the climate change and the poverty of Africa. In this situation it's important that we hold together, that we're steady in the fight against terror and that we give all the support that we can give to British authorities but also to the people who has been affected, and we of course also express our sympathy with the British people and all the single people who today have received messages that near and dear have been affected by serious injuries or death. [...] The same icy feeling as after 9/11, the same definite opinion: this is not something that we'll give away for. If this will become the future norm for how to decide the political agenda, then we'll live in a whole other Europe, a whole other world, and that's something none of us wishes. Now we defend the open society".

===== Middle East =====
- Israel – Prime Minister Ariel Sharon said "In these moments, Israel entirely expresses its solidarity with the people of Britain, aching with their pain, and sending condolences to the families of the dead and wishes of fast recovery to the wounded".
- Kuwait – denounced the attacks in a letter to British Prime Minister Tony Blair from Prime Minister Shaikh Sabah al-Ahmad al-Sabah, who is in the United States. Shaikh Sabah expressed Kuwait's "strong condemnation" of the blasts that left a number of "innocent casualties," said the state news agency KUNA. "These terrorist attacks which target innocent lives are against all human norms and values," the Kuwaiti leader said. Shaikh Sabah also expressed "Kuwait's sympathy and support to friendly Britain and to all actions it will take to eradicate vicious terror in order to preserve security and stability".
- Lebanon – President Émile Lahoud said that "Lebanon, which has been the victim of violence for years, shares with the British their pain".
- Saudi Arabia – Social Affairs Minister Abdulmohsen al-Akkas said his country, battling a two-year wave of attacks by Osama bin Laden's al Qaeda network, knew what London was suffering. "We understand. Since May 2003 we have been experiencing the horrors of terrorist acts" said Akkas, who was visiting London.
- Syria – President Bashar al-Assad condemned the attacks in a cable sent to Prime Minister Tony Blair.
- Turkey – Prime Minister Recep Tayyip Erdoğan said that "we have always stressed that the fight against terror is something we all have to join into together. I believe especially that our mutual intelligence organisations need to pool their information and knowledge to be better able to support one another against attacks of this kind".
- United Arab Emirates – Deputy Prime Minister and Minister for Foreign Affairs Shaikh Hamdan bin Zayed al-Nahayan said the UAE government "condemns in the strongest possible terms these horrific crimes and declares full solidarity with the British government" and that the UAE also "supports any measures [the British government] may take to deal with" the attacks.

===== Oceania =====
- Australia – Prime Minister John Howard, in a live-to-air broadcast, expressed his "horror and disgust at this cowardly attack on innocent people." Mr Howard also stated that "It's important that we stand shoulder to shoulder with our British allies at a time such as this" and that "these types of attacks will not alter the determination of free countries to do the right thing". Recognising an Australian connection to the British capital, Mr. Howard said "Australians will feel very deeply about this because London is the city, above all others outside our own country, we know and identify with". In a radio interview with Australian Broadcasting Corporation on 8 July 2005, PM Howard commented "This attack will not cow the British. It will not cow free people anywhere in the world. It will in fact steel the determination of people who recognise the threat that terrorism poses to democratic societies, to go on with the fight against terrorism".
  - Australian Labor Party leader Kim Beazley said the terrorists were "sub-human filth who must be captured and eliminated". He also stated: "The evil that they stand for must be confronted and they need to know that nothing they can do changes our values and nothing they do eliminates our resolve to deal with them".
- New Zealand – Prime Minister Helen Clark has conveyed to the British government the "deep shock and sympathy and concern of the government and people of New Zealand", and has also requested New Zealand flags be flown at half-mast.

==== Religious reactions ====
===== Muslim =====
- The Grand Mufti of Saudi Arabia, Sheikh Abdul Aziz Al-Asheikh denounced the deadly blasts that rocked London, saying "Killing and terrorising innocent people and the destruction of property are not condoned by Islam". He also censured the terrorists for tarnishing the image of Islam by attaching their heinous crimes to the religion.
- The Muslim Council of Britain said that it "utterly condemns" the "indiscriminate acts of terror".
- The Australian Muslim Civil Rights Advocacy Network have issued a public statement condemning the attacks, offering their condolences to the British people, and pledging their support in bringing the terrorists to justice.
- The Council on American-Islamic Relations condemned the attacks, stating "We join Americans of all faiths, and all people of conscience worldwide, in condemning these barbaric crimes that can never be justified or excused. American Muslims offer their sincere condolences to the loved ones of those who were killed or injured in the attacks and call for the swift apprehension and punishment of the perpetrators".
- The Islamic Circle of North America released a statement saying, "The Islamic Circle of North America (ICNA) is shocked and horrified at the several attacks on the people of London during the rush hour mass transit. We join everyone in condemning such acts of terror and senseless violence. Our thoughts and prayers are with the victims and their loved ones at this tragic moment. We trust that the authorities will determine those responsible for these barbaric acts and bring them to justice quickly".
- Leading Lebanese Shi'ite Muslim scholar Mohammad Hussein Fadlallah stated, "These crimes are not accepted by any religion. It is a barbarism wholly rejected by Islam."
- Most British Muslims were deeply hurt and disgusted at these attacks, especially due to the fact that the bomb site by Aldgate station had a huge surrounding Muslim and Asian community. However, they cited the British government foreign policy as the main reason for the attacks. One in four British Muslims supports the reasons mentioned by the terrorists, whilst 6% felt the attacks were fully justified.
- Al Qaeda cleric Omar Bakri Mohammed approved of the bombings and called them a "warning" for the British government.
- The cousin of Shehzad Tanweer, one of the suicide bombers, approved of the suicide bombings by Tanweer and called him a "good Muslim".
- About 2,000 villagers in Shehzad Tanweer's Pakistani village of origin prayed for him at his funeral.
- Grand Imam Mohammed Sayyed Tantawi of Cairo's Al-Azhar University condemned the attacks and said that the attacks could be not justified as an attempt to force Britain out of Iraq. "This is illogical and cannot be the motive for killing innocent civilians".

===== Christian =====
- Church of England – The Bishop of London, Richard Chartres, issued a statement saying "The attack on London is not an attack on Presidents and men of power but an attack on ordinary Londoners travelling to work by bus and tube...On Wednesday evening St Paul's Cathedral was packed with Londoners come to listen to the Secretary General of the UN and the Chancellor of the Exchequer on what can be done to tackle poverty in the world. The atmosphere was electric and the determination to do something practical to help was obvious. That is the real agenda in today's world. By contrast this act of violence is a cruel irrelevance".
  - Archbishop of Canterbury, Dr Rowan Williams, spoke of his horror and grief. Amid widespread speculation that the bombings were the work of Islamic extremists, he said that, as it happened, he had "spent this morning with Muslim colleagues and friends in West Yorkshire; and we were all as one in our condemnation of this evil and in our shared sense of care and compassion for those affected in whatever way. Such solidarity and common purpose is vital for us all at this time of pain and sorrow and anger". On Friday he gave the "Thought for the Day" on BBC Radio 4 in which he spoke of the difference between shocked silence and calmness.
- Salvation Army – General of The Salvation Army John Larsson sent out mobile relief teams and said to continue to pray for the people of London.
- Vatican City – Pope Benedict XVI has called the attacks "inhuman" and "barbaric acts against humanity."

=== Political forces ===
Organisations such as the Stop the War Campaign take the view that the fault for the bombings lies with the foreign policy decisions of Tony Blair, and particularly his decision to send troops to Iraq to attack the régime of Saddam Hussein, which he claimed harboured weapons of mass destruction. Journalist John Pilger in a column published in the New Statesman on 25 July 2005, ascribed blame to Blair, whose decision to support the invasion of Iraq, and the overthrow of the Saddam Hussein regime, generated the rage that he claimed precipitated those bombings.

- Hamas – Moussa Abu Marzouk, a spokesman for The Palestinian Islamist organisation Hamas, has condemned the bombings, saying "Targeting civilians in their transport means and lives is denounced and rejected".
- – Mayor of Toronto David Miller stated, "residents of Toronto stand in solidarity with people around the world in their condemnation of this and every act of terror".
- – Bertrand Delanoë, the mayor of Paris: "Today, we're all Londoners".

=== 21 July 2005 London bombings ===
==== United Kingdom ====
Tony Blair and Home Secretary Charles Clarke, among other ministers and key officials from government and the emergency services attended a meeting in COBR after the second wave of attacks occurred. Blair also interrupted a meeting with Prime Minister of Australia John Howard to attend a COBR meeting, although he and Howard would later gave a joint news conference in response to the attacks on both the London Underground and Bethnal Green (Howard was also in Washington, D.C., at the time of the 11 September 2001 attacks.)

=== International reaction ===
- United States: The Pentagon raised its security level in response to the attacks. In addition, New York City Police announced that they would begin randomly searching backpacks on the New York City Subway system, though they have said that this move had been under consideration before the events in London.
- Australia: John Howard condemned the attack on the London Underground and Bethnal Green stated that Australia stood by Britain and that people should "beware the minds of terrorists" during a press conference with Tony Blair.
