= Ḥuzn =

The Arabic word found as ḥuzn and ḥazan in the Qur'an and hüzün in modern Turkish refers to the pain and sorrow over a loss, death of relatives in the case of the Qur'an. Two schools further interpreted this feeling. The first sees it as a sign that one is too attached to the material world, while Sufism took it to represent a feeling of personal insufficiency, that one was not getting close enough to God and did not or could not do enough for God in this world. The Turkish writer Orhan Pamuk in the book Istanbul further elaborates on the added meaning hüzün has acquired in modern Turkish. It has come to denote a sense of failure in life, lack of initiative and to retreat into oneself, symptoms quite similar to melancholia. According to Pamuk it was a defining character of cultural works from Istanbul after the fall of the Ottoman Empire. One may see similarities with how melancholic romantic paintings in the west sometimes used ruins from the age of the Roman Empire as a backdrop.

As a parallel with physicians of classical Greece, ancient Arabic physicians and psychologists also categorized ḥuzn as a disease. Al-Kindi (c. 801–873 CE) links it with disease-like mental states like anger, passion, hatred and depression, while Avicenna (980–1037 CE) diagnosed ḥuzn in a lovesick man if his pulse increased drastically when the name of the girl he loved was spoken. Avicenna suggests, in remarkable similarity with Robert Burton, many causes for melancholy, including the fear of death, intrigues surrounding one's life, and lost love. As remedies, he recommends treatments addressing both the medical and philosophical sources of the melancholy, including rational thought, morale, discipline, fasting and coming to terms with the catastrophe.

The various uses of ḥuzn and hüzün thus describe melancholy from a certain vantage point, show similarities with Female hysteria in the case of Avicenna's patient and in a religious context it is not unlike sloth, which by Dante was defined as "failure to love God with all one's heart, all one's mind and all one's soul". Thomas Aquinas described sloth as "an oppressive sorrow, which, to wit, so weighs upon man's mind, that he wants to do nothing".
