= Cultural bereavement =

Grief for loss of culture

Cultural bereavement is the experience of grief over feeling bereaved of one's perceived culture or cultural identity. The phenomenon can include the loss of societal structures or native language, among other things. It is a common feature of human migration. Authors for World Psychiatry state that it "can be viewed as a healthy reaction and a natural consequence of migration; however, if the symptoms cause significant distress or impairment and last for a specified period of time, psychiatric intervention may be warranted".

== See also ==
- Deculturalization
- Cultural assimilation
- Cultural loss
- Cultural genocide
- Lost Icons: Reflections on Cultural Bereavement
- Refugee health
- Hiraeth
