= List of dioceses of the Anglican Church of Canada =

The Anglican Church of Canada, a member church of the worldwide Anglican Communion, contains thirty-two jurisdictions, consisting of twenty-nine dioceses, one administrative region with diocesan status, one ordinariate (for military chaplaincy), and one national pastoral jurisdiction (for indigenous people). The 29 dioceses and the special administrative area are organised into four ecclesiastical provinces.

Most dioceses are contained within a single civil province or territory. The six exceptions are the Arctic, Mishamikoweesh, Moosonee, Nova Scotia and Prince Edward Island, Ottawa, and Rupert's Land dioceses.

Each diocese has a bishop, four of whom are archbishops as metropolitans of their ecclesiastical province. Dioceses are self-governing entities, incorporated under the Corporations Act of the civil province or territory in which they are active.

Diocesan synods generally meet annually and have responsibility for those aspects of church life which do not concern doctrine, discipline, or worship. These latter matters are the purview of the General Synod of the national church, which meets triennially and at other times delegates its powers to an elected body of clergy and laity, called the Council of General Synod, and to the Primate of the Anglican Church of Canada.

== Provinces ==
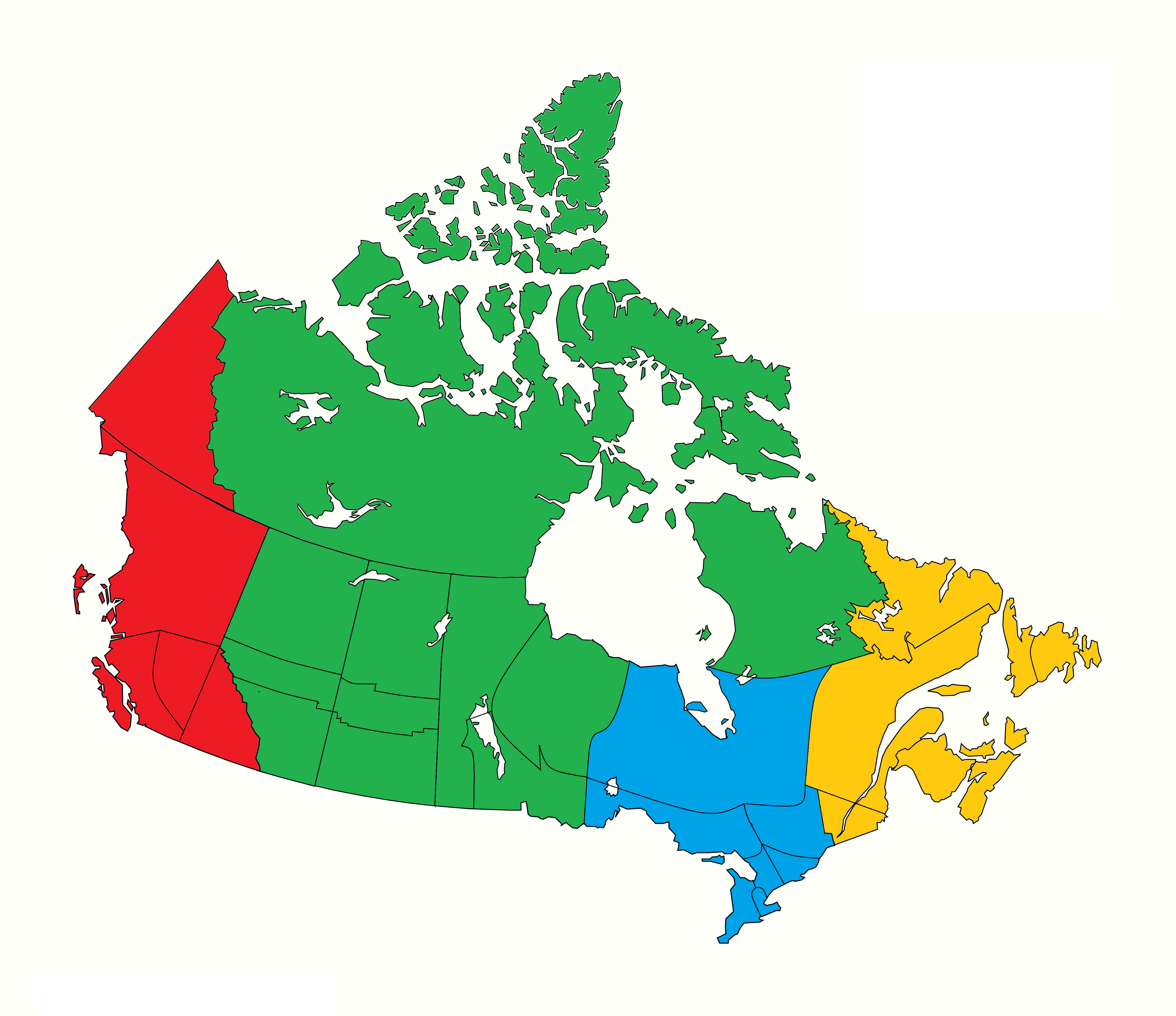
The ecclesiastical provinces and dioceses of the Anglican Church of Canada.

The Anglican Church of Canada is divided into four ecclesiastical provinces, each under the jurisdiction of a provincial synod and a metropolitan archbishop. Originally the metropolitans were bishops of particular dioceses within the provinces. In 1893 the metropolitans were granted the title of "archbishop", and they are now elected from among the bishops of each province.

- The Ecclesiastical Province of Canada was founded in 1860, originally consisting of the four dioceses in the then civil Province of Canada (Upper and Lower Canada, i.e. modern Ontario and Quebec, respectively) under the metropolitical authority of the Bishop of Montreal. The province was expanded in 1870 and 1871 to include New Brunswick and Nova Scotia. In 1913, the Ontario dioceses were split off to form the province of Ontario (see below). The Province was expanded to include the civil province of Newfoundland following its entrance into Confederation in 1949. The province today comprises seven dioceses.
- The Ecclesiastical Province of the Northern Lights (formerly Rupert's Land) was formed in 1875, covering the Prairie Provinces and initially under the metropolitical authority of the Bishop of Rupert's Land. Today it comprises ten dioceses.
- The Ecclesiastical Province of Ontario was formed out of the Province of Canada and the Diocese of Moosonee (which had been in the Ecclesiastical Province of Rupert's Land) in 1912. Today, it comprises seven dioceses.
- The Ecclesiastical Province of British Columbia and Yukon was formed out of the Ecclesiastical Province of Rupert's Land as the Ecclesiastical Province of British Columbia in 1914. It was expanded in 1943 (and consequently renamed) to incorporate the Diocese of Yukon, which was transferred from Rupert's Land. The province today comprises five dioceses and one ecclesiastic territory.

== Archbishops ==
The Primate of Canada (who has no diocese) bears the title Archbishop and is styled The Most Reverend. The current Primate is Shane Parker. The Primate is elected from among all the bishops across the country.

The four metropolitans (who all bear the style of The Most Reverend and the title Archbishop) are:

- Canada: David Edwards, Archbishop of Fredericton
- Rupert's Land: Greg Kerr-Wilson, Archbishop of Calgary
- Ontario: Anne Germond, Archbishop of Algoma
- British Columbia and Yukon: John Stephens, Archbishop of New Westminster

The National Indigenous Anglican Archbishop has no metropolitical authority, but also bears the style of The Most Reverend and the title Archbishop. The holder of this office (established as a bishopric in 2005, inaugurated in 2007, and raised to the status of an archbishopric in 2019) has the spiritual leadership of indigenous people nationwide. Mark MacDonald, the first holder of the office, resigned in 2022 as a result of sexual misconduct. Nicholls appointed Bishop Sidney Black as interim National Indigenous Bishop. In December of that year, Bishop Chris Harper of Saskatoon was announced as the new archbishop-elect.

== Dioceses and bishops ==
Diocese	Province	Territory	Cathedral	See city	Bishop(s)	Founded	Number of parishes (2022)	Membership (2022)	Average Sunday attendance (2022)	Diocese map
Nova Scotia and Prince Edward Island	Canada	Nova Scotia Prince Edward Island	All Saints' Cathedral St. Peter's Cathedral	Halifax Charlottetown	Sandra Fyfe	11 August 1787 (Nova Scotia), covering all British North America (the first Church of England diocese outside England)	94	21,892	5,126	
Quebec	Canada	Quebec	Cathedral of the Holy Trinity	Quebec City	Bruce Myers	28 June 1793, from Nova Scotia diocese	65	1,586	375	
Eastern Newfoundland and Labrador	Canada	Newfoundland and Labrador	Cathedral Church of St. John the Baptist	St. John's	Samuel Rose	1839 (Newfoundland), from Nova Scotia diocese (Note: The old Diocese of Newfoundland was founded in 1839. The Diocese of Eastern Newfoundland and Labrador came into being upon that diocese's 1976 split.)	39	21,053	1,600	
Toronto	Ontario	Ontario	St. James' Cathedral	Toronto	Diocesan: Andrew Asbil; Suffragan: Kevin Robertson, Riscylla Shaw	1839 (a.k.a. Upper Canada), from Quebec diocese	178	37,646	13,810	
Fredericton	Canada	New Brunswick	Christ Church Cathedral	Fredericton	David Edwards	1845 (a.k.a. New Brunswick), from Nova Scotia diocese	72	9,823	2,373	
Rupert's Land	Northern Lights	Manitoba and Ontario	Cathedral of St. John	Winnipeg	Naboth Manzongo	1849 (originally covering all of what is now the ecclesiastical province), probably from Quebec diocese	52	4,215	1,608	
Montreal	Canada	Quebec	Christ Church Cathedral	Montreal	Victor-David Mbuyi Bipungu	1850, from Quebec diocese	68	7,017	3,405	
Huron	Ontario	Ontario	St. Paul's Cathedral	London	Todd Townshend	1857, from Toronto diocese	124	21,000	6,000	
British Columbia (also known as the diocese of Islands and Inlets)	British Columbia and Yukon	British Columbia	Christ Church Cathedral	Victoria	Anna Greenwood-Lee	1859, from Rupert's Land diocese	45	4,890	2,200	
Ontario	Ontario	Ontario	St. George's Cathedral	Kingston	William Cliff	1862, from Toronto diocese	46	5,896	2,261	
Moosonee	Ontario	Ontario and Quebec	St. Matthew's Cathedral	Timmins, ON	Rod BrantFrancis	1872, from Rupert's Land diocese	21	14,219	350	
Algoma	Ontario	Ontario	St. Luke's Cathedral	Sault Ste. Marie	Anne Germond	1873, from Toronto diocese (missionary diocese); 1906 (independence)	52	5,053	923	
Athabasca	Northern Lights	Alberta	St. James' Cathedral	Peace River	David Greenwood	1874, from Rupert's Land diocese	17	896	306	
Saskatchewan	Northern Lights	Saskatchewan	St. Alban's Cathedral	Prince Albert	Diocesan: Richard Reed; Indigenous Bishop: Adam Halkett	1874, from Rupert's Land diocese	22	8,417	915	
Niagara	Ontario	Ontario	Christ's Church Cathedral	Hamilton	Susan Bell	1875, from Toronto diocese	80	12,967	3,916	
Caledonia	British Columbia and Yukon	British Columbia	St. Andrew's Cathedral	Prince Rupert	David Lehmann	1879, from BC diocese	20	1,048	405	
New Westminster	British Columbia and Yukon	British Columbia	Christ Church Cathedral	Vancouver	John Stephens	1879, from BC diocese	63	9,952	3,296	
Mackenzie River	Rupert's Land	Northwest Territories	St Paul's Pro-Cathedral	Fort Chipewyan	Lapsed in 1933 (territory split between the Yukon and Arctic dioceses)	1883, from Athabasca diocese	N/A	N/A	N/A	N/A
Qu'Appelle	Northern Lights	Saskatchewan	St. Paul's Cathedral	Regina	Helen Kennedy	1884 (as Assiniboia), from Rupert's Land and Saskatchewan dioceses; name changed later in 1884	26	2,727	852	
Calgary	Northern Lights	Alberta	Cathedral Church of the Redeemer	Calgary	Greg Kerr-Wilson	1888, from Saskatchewan diocese	67	7,523	2,496	
Yukon	British Columbia and Yukon	Yukon	Christ Church Cathedral	Whitehorse	Vincent Fenga	1891 (as Selkirk; from Mackenzie River)	13	963	122	
Ottawa	Ontario	Ontario and Quebec	Christ Church Cathedral	Ottawa	Kathryn Otley	7 April 1896, from Ontario diocese	68	8,809	2,277	
Kootenay	British Columbia and Yukon	British Columbia	St. Michael and All Angels Cathedral	Kelowna	Lynne McNaughton	1899, from New Westminster diocese	26	2,363	840	
Keewatin	Northern Lights	Ontario and Manitoba	St. Alban's Cathedral (former)	Kenora, ON	Lapsed in 2015 (territory split between the Moosonee and Mishamikoweesh dioceses)	1902, from Rupert's Land diocese	N/A	N/A	N/A	N/A
Brandon	Northern Lights	Manitoba	St. Matthew's Cathedral	Brandon	Rachael Parker	1913, from Rupert's Land diocese	25	2,935	337	
Edmonton	Northern Lights	Alberta	All Saints' Cathedral	Edmonton	Stephen London	1913, from Calgary diocese	44	5,912	1,417	
Cariboo	British Columbia and Yukon	British Columbia	St. Paul's Cathedral	Kamloops	Ceased operation as at December 31, 2001	1914, from New Westminster diocese	N/A	N/A	N/A	N/A
Arctic	Northern Lights	Northwest Territories and Nunavut	St. Jude's Cathedral	Iqaluit, NU	Diocesan: Alexander Pryor Suffragan: Annie Ittoshat, Ann Martha Keenainak, Jared Osborn	1933, from Mackenzie River diocese and parts of Moosonee and Keewatin dioceses	48	33,889	1,808	
Saskatoon	Northern Lights	Saskatchewan	St. John's Cathedral	Saskatoon	Chad McCharles	1933, from Saskatchewan diocese	19	1,500	525	
Central Newfoundland	Canada	Newfoundland and Labrador	St. Martin's Cathedral	Gander	John Watton	1976, from Newfoundland diocese	27	9,375	2,642	
Western Newfoundland	Canada	Newfoundland and Labrador	Cathedral of St. John the Evangelist	Corner Brook	Vacant	1976, from Newfoundland diocese	30	16,360	1,394	
Indigenous Spiritual Ministry of Mishamikoweesh	Northern Lights	Ontario and Manitoba	none designated	Kingfisher Lake	Diocesan: Lydia Mamakwa; Suffragans: Larry Beardy, Morris Fiddler	2014, from Keewatin diocese	28	14,000	900	
Territory of the People	British Columbia and Yukon	British Columbia	St. Paul's Cathedral	Kamloops	Clara Plamondon	2015 ("recognized territory" status) (Note: On November 14, 2015, the Council of the Anglican Church of Canada's General Synod gave final approval to recognition of then-Anglican Parishes of the Central Interior as a "recognized territory [with] the status of a diocese" (but not called one) and the former territory of the former Cariboo diocese.); 2002 (closure of Cariboo diocese) (Note: The Territory of the People encompasses the area formerly known as the Anglican Diocese of Cariboo, which was rendered insolvent by legal claims arising from abuse that occurred in Church-administered First Nations residential schools, and ceased to operate on December 31, 2001. The parishes are currently the pastoral responsibility of the Metropolitan of the ecclesiastical province, and are overseen by a suffragan bishop to the Metropolitan.)	19	1,005	295	
Anglican Military Ordinariate of Canada	NA	Extra-Territorial	Christ Church Cathedral	Ottawa	Jennifer Gosse-Vingerhoeds	1939	N/A	N/A	N/A	N/A

== See also ==
- List of Anglican Communion dioceses
- List of Roman Catholic dioceses in Canada
