= Jenny Andison =

Canadian Anglican cleric (born 1971)

The Right Reverend Jenny Andison
- Rector of St. Paul's, Bloor Street
- Church: Anglican Church of Canada
- Province: Ontario
- Diocese: Toronto
- In office: Since 2021
- Previous posts: Suffragan bishop, Anglican Diocese of Toronto (2017–2021)

Orders
- Consecration: 17 January 2017 by Colin Johnson

Personal details
- Born: September 18, 1971 (age 54) United Kingdom
- Education: Queen's University; Wycliffe College, Toronto

Jennifer Ann Andison (born September 18, 1971) is a Canadian Anglican cleric. She was suffragan bishop of the York-Credit Valley episcopal area in the Diocese of Toronto from 2017 to 2021. She is currently the rector of St. Paul's, Bloor Street, the largest Anglican church in Toronto and St. George's Grange Park.

== Biography ==
Andison was born in 1971 in the United Kingdom. Her parents were medical missionaries with the Church Mission Society, she spent formative years in Pakistan and the family emigrated to Canada when she was 11. She has lived in Pakistan, India, Singapore and Japan.

She was educated at Queen's University and graduated from Wycliffe College, University of Toronto, with a Masters of Divinity in 1997. She was ordained in the Anglican Church of Canada in 1999.

Andison served as deacon at St. Alban's, Tokyo, in 1998; assistant curate at St. Timothy's, Agincourt, from 1999–2001; associate vicar at St. James's, Clerkenwell, from 2001–2005; associate priest at St. Paul's, Bloor Street from 2006–2013; and incumbent at St. Clement's, Eglinton, from 2013–2017.

On September 17, 2016, Andison was elected as a suffragan bishop, alongside Kevin Robertson and Riscylla Shaw. She was consecrated on January 7, 2017, by Colin Johnson, Bishop of Toronto, and Fred Hiltz, Primate of the Anglican Church of Canada, at St. Paul's, Bloor Street. Johnson appointed her to the York-Credit Valley episcopal area. In October 2020, she announced her intention to step down as bishop in early 2021 and become the incumbent of St. Paul's, Bloor Street. She has retained the title of bishop and the style The Right Reverend.

== Awards ==
Honorary Doctorate of Divinity, Tyndale University

== Personal life ==
Andison is married to Tim, a corporate lawyer, and they have three daughters.
