= Riscylla Shaw =

Canadian Anglican bishop (born 1972)

The Right Reverend Riscylla Shaw
- Suffragan Bishop of Toronto
- Church: Anglican Church of Canada
- Province: Ontario
- Diocese: Toronto
- In office: 2017–present

Orders
- Ordination: 6 May 2001 (diaconate); 18 November 2001 (priesthood) by Terence Finlay (diaconate); George Elliott (priesthood)
- Consecration: 17 January 2017 by Colin Johnson

Personal details
- Born: August 22, 1972 (age 53) Ontario, Canada
- Spouse: Jana Shaw
- Children: 2
- Education: Lancaster University (M.Sc.); Wycliffe College, Toronto (M.Div.); University of Toronto (B.A.)

Riscylla Walsh Shaw (born 22 August 1972) is a Canadian Anglican bishop. Since 2017, she has been a suffragan bishop in the Anglican Diocese of Toronto, where she oversees the north and east archdeaconries.

== Early life and education ==
Shaw was born in 1972 to a Métis mother and raised on a farm near Bracebridge, Ontario. She was a cradle Anglican, attending church in the Diocese of Algoma. After completing high school in Bracebridge, she attended the University of Toronto and then Wycliffe College.

== Ordained ministry ==
After a period of working in youth ministry, Shaw was ordained in the Diocese of Toronto in 2001. She was a curate in King City from 2000 to 2002 then incumbent of a two-point parish in Minden Hills and Kinmount from 2003 to 2009, and finally incumbent at Christ Church, Bolton, from 2009 to 2016—all in the Diocese of Toronto. She also served as a diocesan ambassador for Truth and Reconciliation Commission of Canada, participating in TRC events in Winnipeg and Inuvik.

Shaw was elected as one of three new suffragan bishops on 17 September 2016. Alongside Kevin Robertson and Jenny Andison, she was consecrated on January 7, 2017, at St. Paul's, Bloor Street. She was initially responsible for 57 parishes in the Trent-Durham area.

Shaw was a candidate for bishop co-adjutor of the Diocese of Toronto in 2019, although she withdrew after the first ballot. Andrew Asbil was elected. After Asbil's installation and following a reduction in the number of suffragan bishops, Shaw had oversight of the northern and eastern areas of the diocese, including Barrie, Peterborough, and Durham.

At the 2019 General Synod, Shaw supported the effort to revise the Anglican Church of Canada's marriage canon to include same-sex marriage. When the motion failed, she wrote that "we failed the Church again at our General Synod 2019. . . . Once again, we have acted in spiritual arrogance against those made in the image of God, this time our gay, lesbian, bisexual, transgendered and two-spirited siblings in Christ, in denying the validity and sacredness of their love within the sacrament of marriage."

Shaw has also been episcopal visitor to the Worker Sisters of the Holy Spirit, a member of the Anglican Consultative Council and a central committee member of the World Council of Churches. Shaw was a candidate to serve as Primate of the Anglican Church of Canada in the June 2025 election by the General Synod; Shane Parker was elected.

== Personal life ==
Shaw is a citizen of the Métis Nation of Ontario. She is married to Jana Shaw; they have two adult children.

== Publications ==
- Shaw, Riscylla (2020). "Let Ours Be Hands That Bless". In Michaelson, Valerie E.; Durrant, Joan E. (eds.). Decolonizing Discipline: Children, Corporal Punishment, Christian Theologies, and Reconciliation. Winnipeg: University of Manitoba Press. ISBN 9780887558665.
- Shaw, Riscylla (2023). "'I Call Myself Riscylla, Child of God, Métis Citizen': Indigenous Realities". In Hamilton, Karen A. (ed.). Faith as Protest: Answering the Call to Mend the World. Toronto: Novalis. ISBN 9782896888719.
