= Caleb Lawrence =

Canadian retired Anglican bishop (born 1941)

Ordination history of Caleb Lawrence
History
Episcopal consecration
- Consecrated by: Lewis Garnsworthy
- Date: 06-Jan-1980
Episcopal succession
Bishops consecrated by Caleb Lawrence as principal consecrator
- Maurice Philip Poole: 05-Feb-2005
- Patrick Tin-Sik Yu: 25-Mar-2006
- John Holland Chapman: 17-May-2007
- Michael Allan Bird: 30-Sep-2007
- Linda Carol Nicholls: 02-Feb-2008
- Terrance Arthur Dance: 06-Jun-2009
- Stephen Gregory Weed Andrews: 29-Jun-2009

Caleb James Lawrence (born 26 May 1941) is a Canadian retired Anglican bishop.

Lawrence was educated at Dalhousie University and ordained in 1965. He was a missionary at Great Whale River from 1965 until 1975 then Archdeacon of Arctic Quebec. In January 1980 he became the coadjutor bishop of the Diocese of Moosonee and in November of that year the diocesan bishop. He was the diocesan bishop for 30 years and from 2004 to 2009 he was also the Metropolitan of Ontario.

Anglican Communion titles
Preceded by James Augustus Watton	Bishop of Moosonee; 1980–2010	Succeeded by Tom Corston
Preceded by Terence Finlay	Metropolitan of Ontario; 2004–2009	Succeeded by Colin Johnson
