= Colin Johnson (bishop) =

Canadian Anglican archbishop

The Most Reverend Colin Johnson SCP
- 18th Metropolitan of Ontario; Archbishop of Toronto and Moosonee
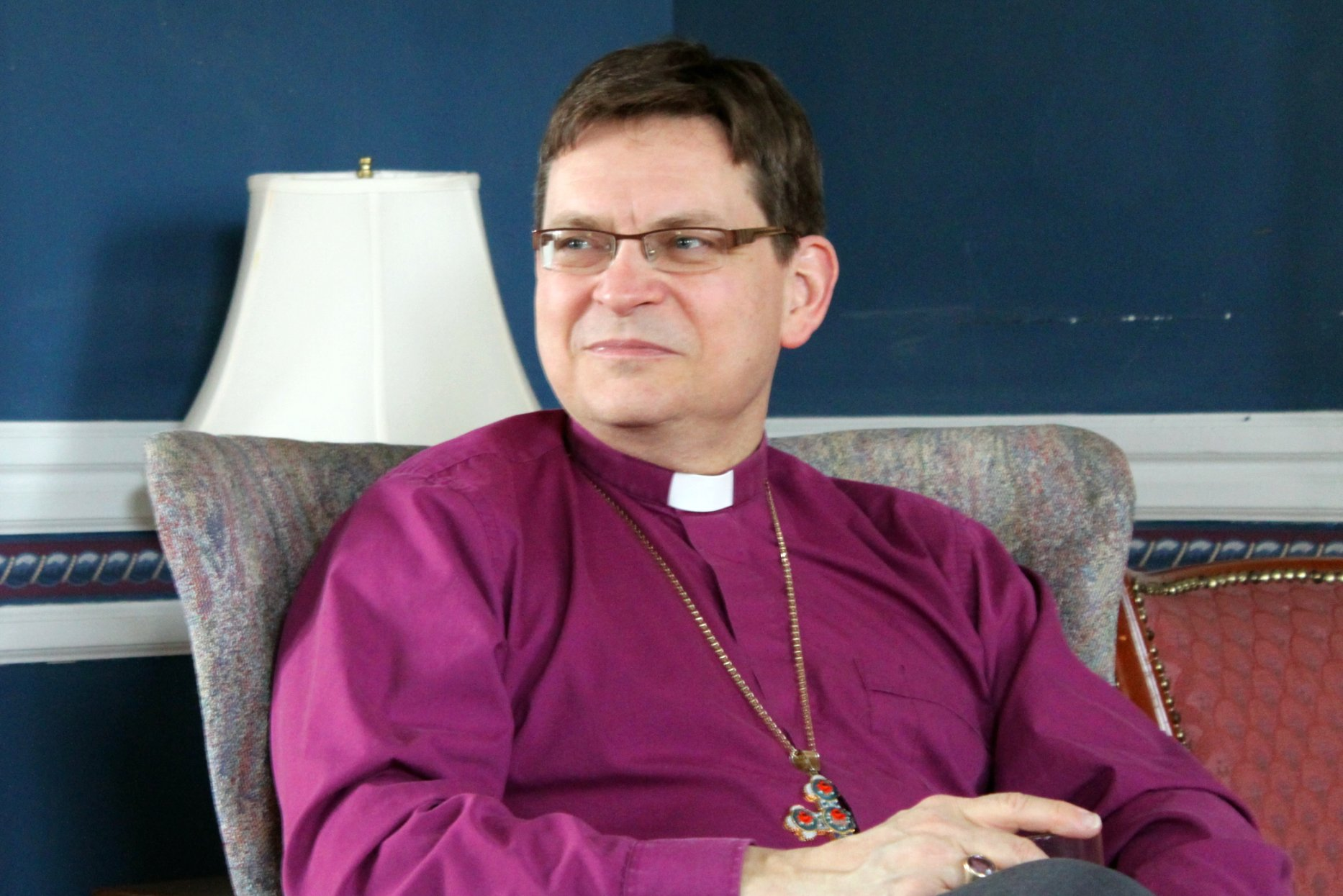
- Archbishop Johnson in 2010
- Church: Anglican Church of Canada
- Province: Province of Ontario
- Diocese: Diocese of Toronto
- In office: 2009–2018 (as Metropolitan)
- Predecessor: Caleb Lawrence
- Successor: Anne Germond
- Other posts: Bishop of Toronto (2004–2018); Bishop of Moosonee (2014–2018); Episcopal Visitor of the Sisterhood of St. John the Divine (2005–2018)

Orders
- Ordination: 1977 (deacon); 1978 (priest)
- Consecration: 21 June 2003

Personal details
- Born: Colin Robert Johnson; November 6, 1952 (age 74)
- Denomination: Anglican
- Spouse: Ellen Smith
- Children: 3
- Education: University of Western Ontario; Trinity College, Toronto

Ordination history of Colin Johnson
History
Episcopal consecration
- Consecrated by: Terence Finlay
- Date: 21-Jun-2003
Episcopal succession
Bishops consecrated by Colin Johnson as principal consecrator
- Thomas Alexander Corston: 06-Jul-2010
- Michael Oulton: 11-Jun-2011
- Peter Fenty: 22-Jun-2013
- Riscylla Shaw: 07-Jan-2017
- Kevin Robertson: 07-Jan-2017
- Jennifer Ann Andison: 07-Jan-2017
- Anne Germond: 11-Feb-2017
- Susan Bell: 05-May-2018
- Andrew Asbil: 29-Sep-2018

Colin Robert Johnson SCP (born 1952) is the former Anglican archbishop of Toronto and Moosonee, and he served as Metropolitan of the Ecclesiastical Province of Ontario from 2009 to 2018. He was the 11th Bishop of Toronto, the largest diocese in the Anglican Church of Canada.

== Early life and education ==
Born in 1952, Johnson was educated at the University of Western Ontario and then received his Master of Divinity degree in 1977 from Trinity College in the University of Toronto.

He was awarded the degree of Doctor of Divinity (honoris causa) by Wycliffe College and Trinity College, both in 2005, and by Huron College in 2015. Johnson was made an Honorary Senior Fellow of Renison University College in 2017. He was elected an honorary Fellow of Trinity College by its Corporation in 2019.

== Ordained ministry ==
He was made a deacon in 1977, ordained to the priesthood in 1978, and served a number of parishes in the Diocese of Toronto before becoming executive assistant to the diocesan bishop in 1992 and archdeacon of York in 1994.

=== Episcopal ministry ===
Johnson was elected suffragan bishop by the diocesan synod on April 23, 2003, at the Cathedral Church of St. James (Toronto) and was consecrated on June 21, 2003, to serve as the area bishop of Trent-Durham, the eastern region of the diocese. He was elected diocesan bishop on June 12, 2004, and installed as the 11th bishop of Toronto on September 12, 2004. He succeeded Terence Finlay, who retired on June 4, 2004, after serving ex officio as diocesan bishop for over 15 years. John Strachan was the first bishop of Toronto when the diocese was created in 1839.

On October 15, 2009, Johnson was elected the 18th metropolitan of the Ecclesiastical Province of Ontario. The Ecclesiastical Province of Ontario includes the dioceses of Moosonee, Algoma, Ontario, Ottawa, Toronto, Niagara and Huron. It extends from the Great Lakes in the south to the shores of James Bay in the north and from Martin Falls (Ogoki Post) in western Ontario to Val D'Or in northern Quebec and Cornwall, Ontario in the east. Collectively, Anglicans in the province represent more than half of the Anglican population in all of Canada. Johnson succeeded Caleb Lawrence of the Diocese of Moosonee, who had been the metropolitan since 2004.

When the 9th Bishop of Moosonee, Tom Corston, retired on December 31, 2013, the Diocese of Moosonee was reorganized as a mission area of the Province of Ontario, with Johnson, as metropolitan, serving as bishop of Moosonee in addition to his jurisdiction in the Diocese of Toronto. He was formally installed as the 10th Bishop of Moosonee on April 1, 2014 at Bishop Anderson Memorial Church, Cochrane and enthroned at St. Matthew's Cathedral, Timmins the next day.

He was elected episcopal visitor of the Sisterhood of St. John the Divine in 2005 and re-elected in 2010, serving until 2015. In 2009, he was named episcopal visitor to the Ontario chapter of the newly constituted North American branch of the Society of Catholic Priests (SCP).

Johnson chaired the Theological Education for the Anglican Communion (TEAC2) Working Group and was a member of the Council of General Synod (2008–2013), the executive body of the Anglican Church of Canada. He is a member of the board of directors of the College for Bishops], of the Episcopal Church, a member of its faculty and a coach for new bishops. He represented the Anglican Church on the National Church Council of the Evangelical Lutheran Church in Canada and is honorary patron of a number of not-for-profit or social service organisations. For several years (1996–2003) he was a member of the Ontario Press Council. He is a founding member of the Bishops in Dialogue consultation to build understanding and respect among diverse leaders within the Anglican Communion.

In October 2018, Johnson stepped down as Metropolitan of Ontario and as Bishop of Moosonee. He retired as Bishop of Toronto on December 31, 2018.

== Personal life ==
Johnson is married to Ellen (née Smith). They have three children (Andrea, Rachel and Timothy) and three granddaughters.

== Coat of arms ==
Coat of arms of Colin Johnson

Crest
Issuant from a circlet of trilliums Argent, a bookwheel Gules its books Argent.
Escutcheon
Gules two Tau crosses in pale their crossbars to the centre, all between 1st and 4th a dove close holding in its beak a sprig of olive and 2nd and 3rd a rose Argent.
Motto
For The Least Of These

Anglican Communion titles
Preceded by Terence Finlay	Bishop of Toronto; 2004–2018	Succeeded by Andrew Asbil
Preceded by Caleb Lawrence	Metropolitan of Ontario; 2009–2018	Succeeded by Anne Germond
Preceded by Tom Corston	Bishop of Moosonee ex officio 2014–2018	Succeeded by Anne Germond
