= Rod BrantFrancis =

Canadian Anglican bishop (born 1967)

The Right Reverend Rod BrantFrancis
- Bishop of Moosonee
- Church: Anglican Church of Canada
- Province: Ontario
- Diocese: Moosonee
- Elected: 26 March 2025
- In office: 2025–present
- Predecessor: Anne Germond (ex officio)

Orders
- Ordination: 2006 (diaconate); 2007 (priesthood) by Caleb Lawrence
- Consecration: May 28, 2025 by Anne Germond

Personal details
- Born: June 13, 1967 (age 59)
- Denomination: Anglicanism
- Spouse: Lisa BrantFrancis
- Education: Church Army Training College, Toronto

Rodney Wallace BrantFrancis (born June 13, 1967) is a Canadian Anglican bishop. In 2025, he was elected the 12th bishop of the Anglican Diocese of Moosonee in the Anglican Church of Canada. Prior to being elected bishop, BrantFrancis was a priest in the Diocese of Ontario.

== Biography ==
BrantFrancis is Mi'kmaq and was raised in Newfoundland. He trained for ministry at the Toronto-based Church Army Training College and was commissioned as a Church Army (now Threshold Ministries) evangelist in 1994. He was ordained as a deacon in 2006 and as priest in 2007 in the Diocese of Moosonee. BrantFrancis has worked as a prison chaplain, in Mission to Seafarers in the Diocese of Fredericton, and in parish ministry in Wemindji, a Cree community in remote northern Quebec, from 2006 to 2016 and in the Tyendinaga Mohawk Territory in the Diocese of Ontario from 2016 to 2025.

In March 2025, he was elected bishop of Moosonee, the first diocesan bishop since 2013, when the diocese became a mission area of the Ecclesiastical Province of Ontario during a period of financial difficulty. He was consecrated and seated as a bishop on May 28, 2025, at St. Matthew's Cathedral in Timmins.

== Personal life ==
In 2017, BrantFrancis, a member of the Qalipu First Nation, was accepted into the Mohawks of the Bay of Quinte First Nation. He is married to Lisa BrantFrancis, a fellow priest and Threshold Ministries evangelist.

Anglican Communion titles
Preceded by Anne Germond	Bishop of Moosonee; Since 2025	Incumbent
