= St. George's Anglican Church (Georgina, Ontario) =

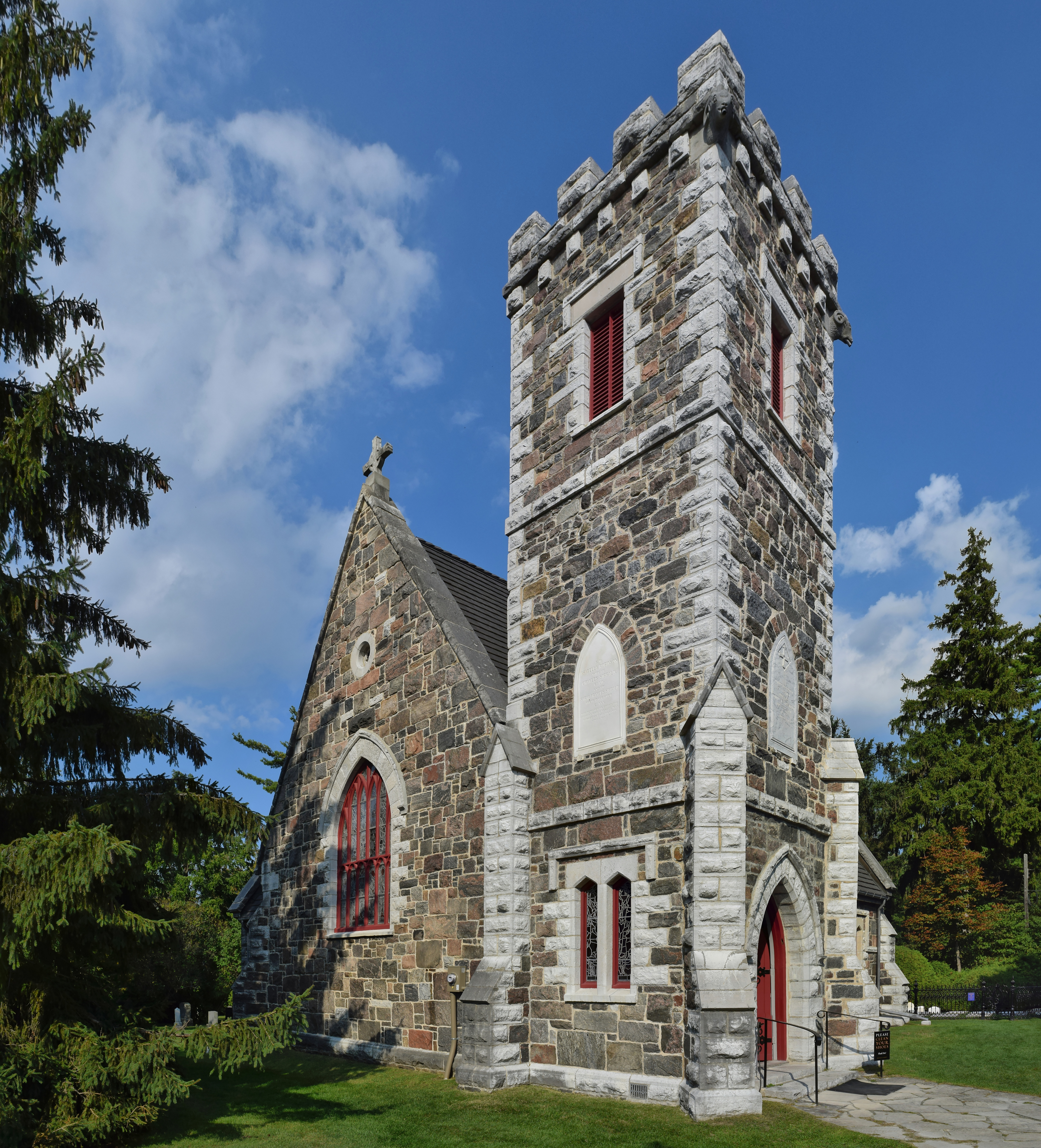
- St. George's Anglican Church.
- St. George's Anglican Church
- 44.33134°N 79.33236°W
- Location: Georgina, Ontario
- Country: Canada
- Denomination: Anglican Church of Canada
- Website: Official Website

History
- Status: Parish church
- Founded: 1839
- Dedication: Saint George

Architecture
- Functional status: Active
- Style: Neo-Gothic
- Completed: 1839 (Original wooden structure); 1877 (Current stone structure)

Specifications
- Materials: Stone

Administration
- Province: Ontario

Ontario Heritage Act
- Type: Property of Historical and Architectural Value and Interest
- Designated: August 13, 2001
- Diocese: Toronto

St. George's Anglican Church is a Neo-Gothic stone church located in Georgina listed under the Ontario Heritage Act. It is located in the community of Sibbald Point, and the current building was consecrated in 1877.
