= Philip Poole =

Philip Poole may refer to:

- Phillip Poole (born 1981), English ice dancer and ice dance coach
- Philip Poole (bishop), suffragan bishop in the Anglican Diocese of Toronto, Canada
- Philip Poole (soccer) (born 1981), English-born soccer coach
