= Lewis Garnsworthy =

Canadian Anglican bishop (1922–1990)

Lewis Samuel Garnsworthy (1922 – January 26, 1990) was a Canadian religious leader. He served as the Anglican Bishop of Toronto from 1972 to 1989 and was the Archbishop of the ecclesiastical province of Ontario from 1979 to 1985.

== Early life ==
Garnsworthy was born in Edmonton, Alberta, the son of an unemployed carpenter. Raised in a non-religious environment, he became a practising Christian after being taken to Bible class at age seventeen. He received a Bachelor's Degree at the University of Alberta in 1943 and later earned a theological degree from Wycliffe College in Toronto. He spent twenty-two years as a priest at St. Mary's, Richmond Hill and St. John's, York Mills, in the city before being elected as an assistant bishop in 1968.

== Bishop of Toronto ==
In 1972, he was chosen as the ninth Bishop of Toronto. In this capacity, he presided over a diocese of 160,000 people, the largest in Canada. He became an archbishop in 1979. When the Anglican Diocese of Toronto was divided into five regions in 1980, Garnsworthy himself was given charge of the downtown division. Garnsworthy was a frequent guest at official state functions, and in October 1982 he conducted the funeral ceremonies for former premier John Robarts.

Views on the Church in Canadian society

Garnsworthy argued in 1982 that the Anglican Church should stop performing civil marriage ceremonies. Saying that the church should not act as a "cheap auxiliary to the state," he called for Canadian marriages to consist of a civil marriage performed by the state with the additional option of a "service of blessing" for those who wish it. At the time, Garnsworthy's views were considered controversial.

He acknowledged in 1986 that the Anglican Church had only limited influence in Canada's "comfortable" society, saying that it had more authority in places like South Africa where it was the victim of persecution. He rejected the suggestion that the church could rebrand itself in the manner of American televangelists, saying "I don't think you can sell religion like soap." In 1988, he accepted a court ruling that ended compulsory recitations of the Lord's Prayer in Ontario public schools.

In 1983, Garnsworthy and Community and Social Services Minister Frank Drea signed an agreement for the Government of Ontario and various churches to provide housing, meals, and day programs for poor and mentally ill individuals.

The role of women within the Church

Garnsworthy initially opposed the ordination of women, but later reversed his position and became a proponent of the policy.

LGBT issues

In 1979, Garnsworthy defended the Anglican Church's decision to accept openly gay priests on condition that such individuals not participate in same-sex sexual activity. He argued that the decision was not a change of policy for the church and that equivalent restrictions existed for heterosexual priests in relationships out of wedlock. Brent Hawkes of the Metropolitan Community Church of Toronto cautiously accepted the Anglican Church's decision as a step forward, although he added that the requirement for celibacy would still result in gay priests being closeted.

Separate school funding

Garnsworthy took part in a high-profile dispute with the Government of Ontario from 1984 to 1986, after Progressive Conservative premier Bill Davis made a surprise decision to fund Ontario's public and Catholic high schools on an equal footing. (The province had previously funded Catholic education only as far as Grade Ten.) Garnsworthy strongly opposed the decision and wrote an article complaining that the religious and moral values of the Roman Catholic Church had in effect been given official state sanction. In particular, he wrote that he did not accept the Catholic positions on family planning, contraception, and abortion, nor did he accept the church's claim to be the sole arbiter of religious truth. Some believe that this intervention had the effect of dividing the funding issue along religious lines. Garnsworthy responded that he was not anti-Catholic and did not want to revive sectarian conflicts from the nineteenth century, but that he believed in and wanted to defend Ontario's public education system.

During the 1985 provincial election, Garnsworthy accused Davis of changing the province's education system in the same manner as Adolf Hitler in 1930s Germany. He declined to withdraw the analogy, saying "This is how Hitler changed education in Germany, by exactly the same process, by decree. I won't take that back." (He later clarified that he was not comparing Davis with Hitler in a more general sense.) Frank Miller, who had by this time succeeded Davis as premier and was continuing his funding policy, described the comment as "odious" and "totally unfounded."

Many believe this controversy caused significant damage for the Progressive Conservatives in the 1985 election, costing them support among their historically strong constituency of Anglican voters. David Rotenberg, a cabinet minister defeated in his bid for re-election, remarked, "I think [Garnsworthy] would probably get the Ian Paisley award of the year because his speech certainly made it respectable to be anti-Catholic." The Progressive Conservatives actually won the election by a narrow margin and formed a minority government afterwards, but lost power two months later after being defeated on a confidence vote in the legislature.

The new government of Liberal premier David Peterson continued Davis and Miller's support for full Catholic school funding, and Garnsworthy continued his battle against the legislation. In 1986, Garnsworthy argued that teachers applying for positions in the Catholic system should not be required to have a letter of recommendation from a priest; his position was that this requirement prevented non-Catholics from seeking a publicly funded office. Despite his efforts, full funding was extended to Catholic schools by the Peterson government.

Other views

Garnsworthy defended Ontario's Sunday shopping laws in 1986 and argued that store owners who violated the laws were exploiting their non-unionized employees. In 1987, he spoke against a proposal to re-institute the death penalty in Canada. Garnsworthy spoke in support of AIDS victims in 1987, saying that they have a right to pastoral care within the church community and expressing concern at "fear and ignorance abroad about AIDS."

== Final years ==
Garnsworthy did not seek re-election to his provincial office in 1985. He retired as Bishop of Toronto in 1989; in his last address, he called on the various churches of Toronto to work together and take a greater role in combatting social ills.

Garnsworthy underwent surgery to remove a cancerous lung in July 1983. He died in January 1990. The Lewis Garnsworthy Residence on Toronto's Dufferin Street is named in his honour.

Anglican Communion titles
Preceded by George Boyd Snell	Bishop of Toronto; 1972 – 1988	Succeeded by Terence Edward Finlay
Preceded by James Augustus Watton	Metropolitan of Ontario; 1979 – 1985	Succeeded by John Charles Bothwell
