= Ann Tottenham =

Canadian Anglican bishop

The Right Reverend Ann Tottenham
- Bishop of the Credit Valley
- Church: Anglican Church of Canada
- Diocese: Anglican Diocese of Toronto
- In office: 1997–2005
- Predecessor: Victoria Matthews
- Successor: Philip Poole
- Other posts: Incumbent of St. George's parish, Newcastle, and St. Saviour's parish, Orono, Ontario

Orders
- Ordination: 1983
- Consecration: 1997

Personal details
- Born: July 21, 1940 (age 86) Kingston, Ontario, Canada
- Education: Trinity College, Toronto

Ann Elizabeth Tottenham (born July 21, 1940) is a retired bishop of the Anglican Church of Canada.

She is the oldest child of Charles Tottenham, 8th Marquess of Ely who emigrated to Ontario, Canada. Although entitled to the style Lady Ann Tottenham, she does not use this. Her brother is John Tottenham, 9th Marquess of Ely.

Tottenham was the second Anglican woman to be elected as a bishop in Canada, in the Diocese of Toronto. She served until her retirement in 2005.

== Teacher ==
She was educated at the University of Toronto, Trinity College, Toronto and a seminary in New York. In the late 1960s she became an Anglican nun for three years before becoming a teacher. She became the headmistress of Bishop Strachan School, a private school with Anglican links, in Toronto from 1981 to 1995.

== Religious life ==
Tottenham was ordained in 1983 and, after leaving teaching, was the incumbent priest in two parishes, St. George's, Newcastle, and St. Saviour's, Orono, Ontario. In 1997, she was elected as a suffragan bishop with responsibility for the Credit Valley area of the Diocese of Toronto. She was the second woman to be elected an Anglican bishop in Toronto and Canada. She succeeded the first Canadian Anglican woman to become a bishop, Victoria Matthews, as Credit Valley area bishop.

She retired in 2005, but in 2007 was appointed Assistant Bishop in the Diocese of Niagara and served part-time in this role until the retirement of Bishop Ralph Spence in 2008.
