= Frederick Wilkinson =

Canadian Anglican bishop (1896–1980)

Frederick Hugh Wilkinson MM (two bars), ED (1896 – 1980) was the 7th Bishop of Toronto.

== Life and ministry ==
Wilkinson was born in 1896 into an ecclesiastical family and educated at the University of Toronto. He was ordained in 1925.

He began his ordained ministry as a curate at the Church of the Ascension, Hamilton, Ontario. After this he was a professor at the College of Emmanuel and St. Chad, Saskatoon and then Rector of St Stephen's Calgary . He was Sub-Dean of Christ Church Cathedral, Vancouver from 1932 to 1936. Further incumbencies at St James's Montreal and St Paul's Toronto followed before he became a coadjutor bishop of the Diocese of Toronto in 1953 and its diocesan bishop in 1955. He served until 1966 and died in 1980.

Religious titles
Preceded by Alton Ray Beverley	Bishop of Toronto; 1955 – 1966	Succeeded by George Boyd Snell
