= Tom Corston =

Canadian Anglican bishop (1949–2022)

Thomas Alexander Corston (May 29, 1949 – January 7, 2022) was a Canadian Anglican bishop. He served as the 9th Bishop of Moosonee from 2010 to 2013.

== Life and career ==
Corston was born in Chapleau, Ontario, on May 29, 1949. He was educated at Chapleau High School and Lakehead University, and ordained in 1975. His first post was as a curate at the Church of St. Michael and All Angels in Toronto. He then held incumbencies in Gogama, Longlac, South Porcupine, Fredericton, Sault Ste. Marie and Sudbury.

He was Archdeacon of Manitoulin for eight years until his ordination to the episcopate as the 9th Bishop of Moosonee in 2010. He served in that position until he retired on December 31, 2013, and thereafter acted as Assisting Bishop. At that point, the diocese was reorganized as a mission area of the Ecclesiastical Province of Ontario, with the Metropolitan of Ontario serving as Bishop of Moosonee.

Corston died from cancer on January 7, 2022, at the age of 72.

Religious titles
Preceded by Caleb Lawrence	Bishop of Moosonee; 2010–2013	Succeeded by Colin Johnson
