= James Ferry (priest) =

The Reverend James Ferry
- Assistant priest at the Church of the Holy Trinity
- Church: Anglican Church of Canada
- Province: Ontario
- Diocese: Diocese of Toronto
- Appointed: 2011

Personal details
- Born: 1952 (age 73–74)

James Ferry (born 1952) is a Canadian Anglican priest who became a central figure in the struggle of LGBTQ+ inclusion within the church due to his sexual orientation as a gay man. The issues surrounding Ferry arose in the early 1990s when he was publicly defrocked by the Anglican church after being outed by Archbishop Terence Finlay, who ordered him to end his relationship with his partner. After Ferry's refusal, Finlay took him to a bishop's court and had his license as a priest revoked. Ferry wrote a memoir titled In the Courts of the Lord: A Gay Minister’s Story in response to this, detailing the spiritual, personal, and professional hardships caused by the church's position on homosexuality, and how he has overcome those struggles in the years following.

== Life and career ==
James Ferry grew up a Baptist but converted to Anglicanism in his young adult years. He had married young and had been in a failed marriage with an evangelical woman, and several relationships with men. In his memoir, he talks about how he eventually came to terms with his sexuality. Ferry calls out the church for its divisiveness on the topic of gay clergy. He further reflects that he has become a one-dimensional victim, which is exactly what he was trying to avoid. He wanted to return to the life of ministry that he enjoyed and be valued as a good minister who just so happens to be gay.

Ferry was appointed as the honorary assistant at the parish of St. Peter's Church in Erindale, where he also married his husband, Jun, in 2017. He is a graduate of the University of Toronto and Wycliffe College and was ordained in 1980, serving as an assistant curate at St. Michael & All Angels, followed by serving as a priest at St. Saviour's in East Toronto and St. Philip's on-the-hill in Unionville.

After being removed from active ministry in 1992, he attended Holy Trinity in Toronto for 20 years and became an honorary assistant in 2011 before going to St. Peter's. While at Holy Trinity, his sermon "Pride and Prejudice" was used as the opening of the church's annual Pride Week celebrations. Ferry worked for the Ontario Advocacy Commission and then at the Ministry of Health and Long-Term Care's Psychiatric Patient Advocate Office for 20 years before retiring in 2019.

== Bishop's court ==
A bishop's court is a practice that was introduced in the Tudor period to persecute and subdue heretics and other people that the church deemed sinners. It was rarely ever used but was reintroduced to reprimand Ferry's unwillingness to end his relationship with his partner after being advised by Archbishop Finlay.

In the 1992 trial, Finlay ruled that "Ferry was guilty of wrongdoing by refusing to refrain from a homosexual relationship", which subsequently reinstated the 1979 ruling put in place by the Anglican House of Bishops in Canada. This ruling recognizes gay priests, but states that they must remain celibate and not act upon their sexualities.

Ferry had been a priest for 11 years at the time of his trial but was defrocked after the proceedings. He vowed to fight his removal from the church and called attention to over 40 homosexual clergy in the Toronto Anglican diocese who were known by the bishops, signalling the hypocrisy of the church and how they handled these issues. The results of these court proceedings sent Ferry into nearly a decade of grieving, where he viewed God as an "abusive father" who was allowing his son to be prosecuted out of love. Despite the loss of his ministry as a priest, he remained engaged within other forms of ministry because of his strong religious beliefs.

== Service of reconciliation ==
In 2011, after 20 years of estrangement, Ferry and the former Archbishop of Toronto, Terence Finlay, reconnected in a service of reconciliation. This service included a sermon, a Eucharist, and Ferry's forgiveness of Finlay's prior actions. Finlay had outed Ferry to the parish after Ferry had confided in him about his sexuality, resulting in the bishop's court revoking his priesthood. In the time since Finlay's outing of Ferry's sexuality, he came to deeply regret his decision. He began advocating for lesbian and gay members of the church, even going as far as to officiate at a same-sex wedding. Finlay has become very supportive of the queer community. He wishes that he had made more of an effort to de-escalate the situation instead of outing Ferry. Finlay has said that conversations about homosexuality have led the church's opinion on the community and their inclusion to advance.

Ferry called the service a moment of grace for both he and Finlay, and it symbolized a moment of healing and understanding between two people who represented conflicting perspectives on LGBTQ+ inclusion within the Anglican Church. The service led Archbishop Colin Johnson of the Diocese of Toronto to reinstate Ferry's license as a priest.
