= Cooper Robinson =

Cuthbert Cooper Robinson was an Anglican bishop in the 20th century.

He was born into an ecclesiastical family on 26 May 1893 and educated at the University of Toronto. Ordained after World War I service with the Canadian Army, in 1920 he was engaged in educational work in Japan until 1938. He held incumbencies at Geraldton, Forest and Noranda. He was Dean of Moosonee from 1948 until 1954 when he became its diocesan bishop, a post he held until his retirement in 1963. He died on 30 May 1971.

Anglican Communion titles
Preceded by Robert John Renison	Bishop of Moosonee; 1954–1963	Succeeded by James Augustus Watton
