= George Elliott (bishop) =

George Elliott, M.Div. (born 1949) is a retired Canadian Suffragan Bishop: he was in charge of the York-Simcoe area of the Diocese of Toronto from 2001 until 2013.
