= Patrick Yu (bishop) =

Patrick Yu was a suffragan bishop in the Anglican Diocese of Toronto, Canada from 2006 to 2017: he is in charge of the York-Scarborough area of the Diocese.

Yu was educated at Wycliffe College, Toronto and the Toronto School of Theology; and ordained in 1981. After a curacy at Scarborough, he was the incumbent of Coldwater-Medonte from 1983 to 1990, St Theodore of Canterbury, Toronto from 1991 to 1997 and Saint Timothy, Agincourt from 1997 until his election as Suffragan Bishop in 2006.

Bishop Yu retired in early 2017 and commenced as a teacher at Minghua Theological College in Hong Kong.
