= Renison University College =

Canadian college in Waterloo, Ontario

Coordinates: 43°28′7″N 80°32′50″W

- Coat of arms of Renison University College
- Former name: Renison College
- Motto: Sed Coelum Solum
- Motto in English: One Sky Over All
- Type: University college
- Established: 1959
- Affiliations: University of Waterloo
- Religious affiliation: Anglican Church of Canada
- Endowment: $2.4 Million
- Chairperson: Joseph Olubobokun
- President: The Rev. Dr. Marc Jerry
- Dean: Vacant
- Visitor: The Rt. Rev. R. Todd Townshend, ThD (as Bishop of Huron)
- Academic staff: 32
- Administrative staff: 57
- Undergraduates: 702
- Postgraduates: 195
- Other students: 214 (Residence Students)
- Location: Waterloo, Ontario, Canada
- Degree Programs Offered: Bachelor of Arts, Bachelor of Social Work, Master of Social Work
Colors
- Sporting affiliations: Waterloo Warriors
- Mascot: Reni Moose
- Website: uwaterloo.ca/renison

Renison University College is an affiliated university college of the University of Waterloo and located in Waterloo, Ontario, Canada. Renison's campus is situated on the western border of Waterloo's main campus. The university college offers academic programs that count as credit toward a University of Waterloo degree. Most academic courses are offered within Waterloo's Faculty of Arts, focusing on social sciences, language, and culture.

Renison focuses its academic work in three primary areas: Social Engagement and Innovation; Global Engagement through Languages and Cultures; and Community Engagement through the offering of non-degree programs and praxis-based learning related to various degrees. Renison's social engagement and Innovation focus is developed in the work of the department of Social Development Studies and Renison's School of Social Work. The focus on global engagements finds expression in a variety of forms, most notably through the work of the department of Culture and Language Studies and the Studies in Islam program unit. Its focus on Community Engagement is gathered in the Centre for Community and Professional Education.

Renison University College maintains a residence that houses up to 214 University of Waterloo students. Residents may be in any field of undergraduate study at the University of Waterloo and are not mandated to take courses at Renison. The university college residence maintains one of the lowest don-to-student ratios of all the on-campus residences.

The institution was established on January 14, 1959, as Renison College, under the authority of the Synod of the Anglican Diocese of Huron. In 2010, it officially became Renison University College as a reflection of Renison's academic focus. It was founded by members of the local Anglican community in Waterloo, Ontario, and Kitchener, Ontario, and continues to be affiliated with the Anglican Church of Canada.

== History ==
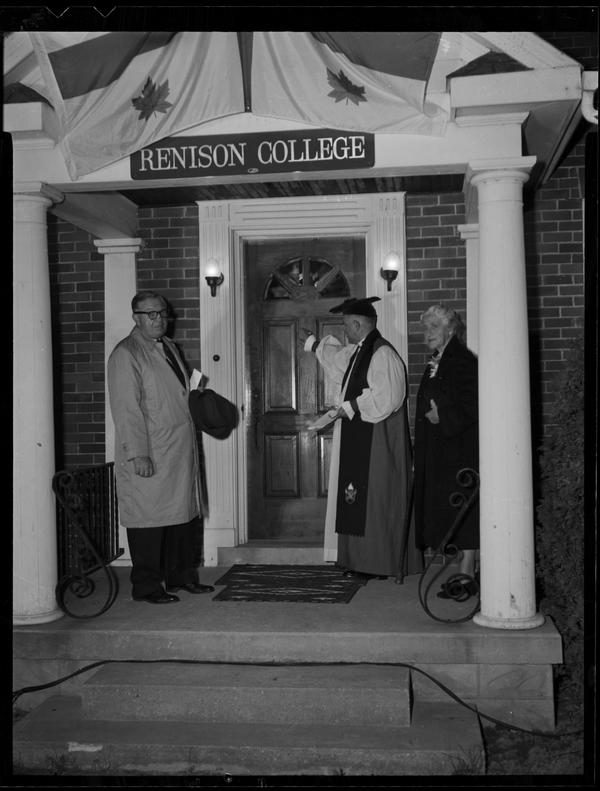
Carl Dunker, G.N. Luxton and Mrs. R.J. Renison during the official opening of Renison College on October 16, 1959.

Renison was incorporated on January 14, 1959, by provincial Letters Patent and under the authority of the Synod of the Diocese of Huron, due to the efforts of the Kitchener and Waterloo Anglican communities. The efforts of Renison Founder The Ven. Harvey Southcott, who was rector of Church of the Holy Saviour at the time, were particularly influential as he had the original vision for an Anglican college in Waterloo. Renison continues to enjoy support from the Anglican community and, in particular, from within the diocese.

Originally a two-storey, seven-room house at 193 Albert Street in Waterloo that opened its doors in 1959, Renison College featured a small chapel, chaplain's office, a small library, a study and meeting space for students, and three bedrooms that accommodated seven male students. The college offered courses in religious knowledge, geography and philosophy.

On July 1, 1960, Renison struck an affiliation agreement with the University of Waterloo for the right to offer programs in Arts and the Social Sciences for credit towards a Bachelor of Arts degree from Waterloo. The university transferred five acres of land on the west side of its campus to Renison in 1961, and Renison purchased an additional acre.

=== Name change ===
Originally incorporated in 1959 as Renison College, it was felt that the addition of the word ‘university’ would strengthen Renison's reputation and identity with international partners. During her tenure as Principal, Dr. Gail Cuthbert Brandt had explored the option of gaining an individual charter for Renison. However, it wasn't until Dr. John Crossley's tenure in the mid-2000s that the process began to move forward. In 2010, following years of negotiations, supplementary Letters Patent were issued by the Government of Ontario, making the official name of the college 'Renison University College' and reflecting Renison's academic focus.

=== Namesake ===
Renison University College was named after a contemporary Canadian church leader, The Most Reverend Robert John Renison. Archbishop Renison served in the Anglican Church of Canada with great distinction for nearly six decades, a significant amount of that time being spent in Northern Ontario. Before his death in 1957, he became Metropolitan of Ontario and Archbishop of Moosonee. Archbishop Renison's widow, Elisabeth, presented the college with his portrait and a painting of his personal coat of arms. The family agreed to let the new institution use his heraldic emblem and accompanying motto, Sed Coelum Solum (one sky over all), until the college was granted its own unique coat of arms in 1978.

== Campus ==
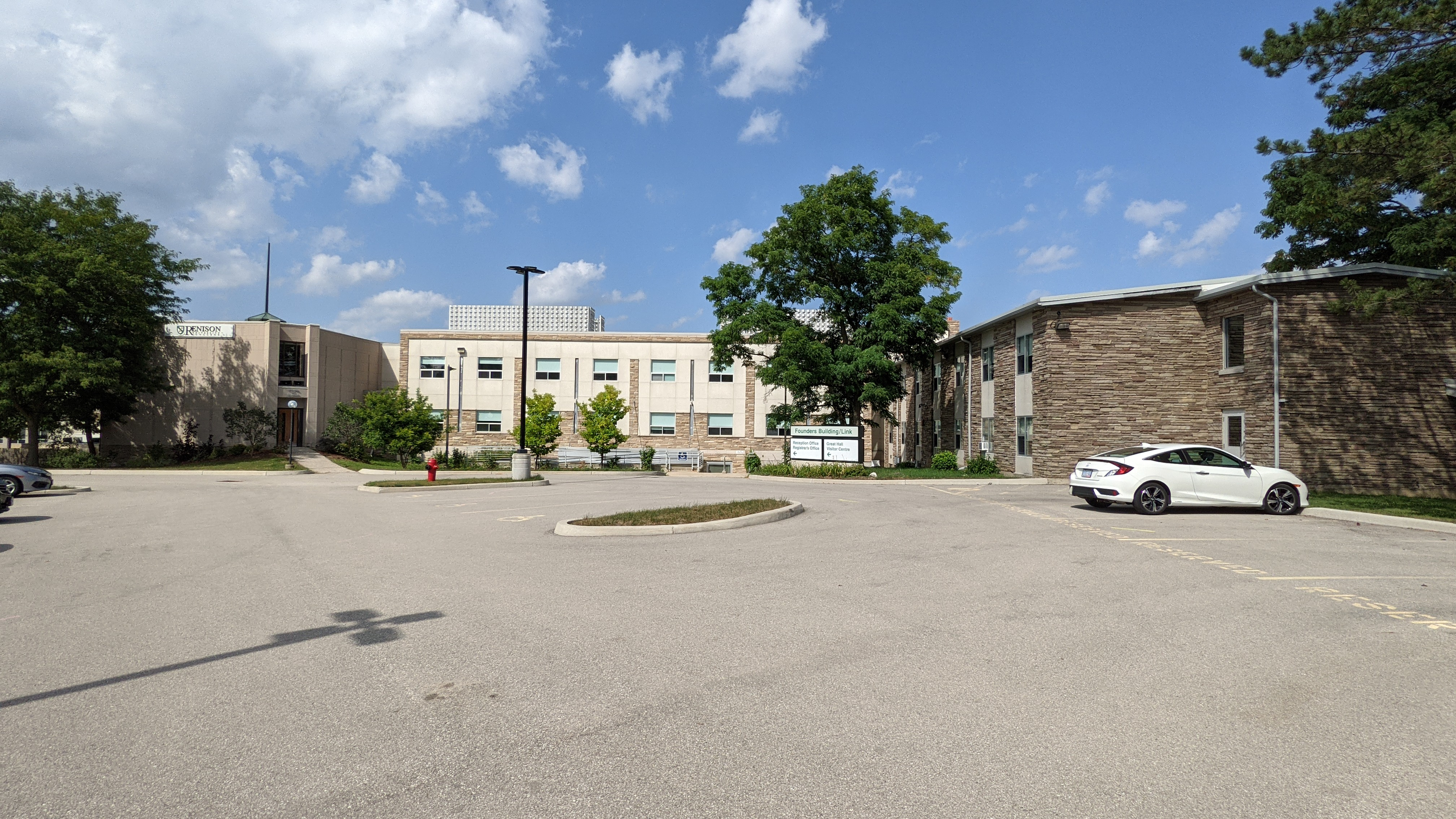
Renison's campus

Renison is situated on 6 acres of land in Waterloo, Ontario and is directly adjacent to the University of Waterloo campus. Most buildings on the University of Waterloo campus are a five-minute walk from Renison. Renison's campus is bordered by the University of Waterloo, St. Jerome's University, and United College. One numbered road intersects Renison's campus: Westmount Road North.

=== Buildings ===
In 1962, Renison completed its first building on the current campus, the Founders Building, which provided offices, classrooms, and two residence wings to house 40 men and 40 women. The cornerstone of this first building on Renison's campus was laid by Elizabeth Renison and LCol. J. Keiller MacKay, 19th Lieutenant Governor of Ontario.

Thanks to Renison and the other affiliated colleges, 1962 was the first time Waterloo students could live on campus as the first Waterloo residence would not be opened until 1965.

In 1964, Renison expanded with the construction of the Luxton Building, with classrooms, faculty offices, and a residence for 98 men, allowing the Founders Building to be used as the women's residence. This building was named for George N. Luxton, Bishop of Huron and Renison's first chancellor and, later, first Visitor. The Luxton Building would also come to include a favourite place for student relaxation at Renison, the Moose Room.

Then, in 1992, the college expanded further with the addition of the Chapel of St. Bede, the Great Hall cafeteria, two additional residence floors, and an enlarged library. This would be followed in 2005 with the addition of the Academic Centre. This building included six large classrooms, office space to accommodate Renison's growing faculty and staff, the Keiko and Charles Belair Centre for East Asian Studies, a substantially larger library with meeting rooms and the Ministry Centre.

2013 saw the completion of the East Side Extension, which is home to new classroom space, student lounges, and Renison's School of Social Work. Ontario's 28th Lieutenant Governor, David C. Onley, was in attendance at the grand opening to declare the building officially open.

Renison completed its newest building in 2015 and was opened by David Johnston, Governor General of Canada and former president of the University of Waterloo. This building is home to Renison's English Language Institute and English Language Studies. With 17 new classrooms, the complex also features student lounges, meeting rooms, a glass atrium capable of hosting small events, and office space for staff and faculty members.

=== Lusi Wong Library ===
Renison houses the Lusi Wong Library, whose collection focuses on the subjects taught at Renison. Renison students have access to over 7 million items within the library's resources through the Tri-University Group of Libraries (TUG) system. TUG is part of a partnership involving the libraries of the University of Waterloo, Wilfrid Laurier University, and the University of Guelph. Students have access to library resources totaling 7.5 million items through the automated library system. Renison students are able to borrow books and other resources from any of the three libraries and have them delivered to the Lusi Wong Library for pick-up. Likewise, any books borrowed from these three universities’ libraries can be returned at Renison. Study rooms are available for students to book for group work or small meetings. In a poll conducted by the University of Waterloo's student newspaper, The Imprint, Renison's Lusi Wong Library was voted the best place to study on campus.

=== The Luscott Ministry Centre ===
Renison is home to the Luscott Ministry Centre, where all students, staff, and faculty have the opportunity to relax on couches, enjoy free coffee, tea, and cookies, and make use of a variety of stress relief activities. The Ministry Centre contains the offices of the Assistant Director, Student Experience and Housing, and Renison's Chaplain, with whom many students, staff, and faculty discuss questions (big and small), concerns, and joys. The Ministry Centre is a meeting place where community forms, faith is a welcome part of conversation, and transformation is championed.

=== Link Inclusion Lounge ===
In September 2024, a new space was unveiled at the college called the Link Inclusion Lounge. The space celebrates itself as a welcoming and inclusive space for students from equity-deserving communities to connect together and strengthen their feelings of belonging on campus. The space, located in the “Link” wing of Renison in the previous Registrar's Office space, includes office space for two Inclusion Coordinators (Bachelor of Social Work placement students) as well as a one-on-one meeting space. Events to bring students from equity-deserving communities together are facilitated in this space.

=== Chapel of St. Bede ===
The Chapel of St. Bede is the Anglican chapel at Renison University College, and is part of the Diocese of Huron. Monday evening worship is held here, along with midweek prayers, and is officiated by the college's chaplain, The Rev. Scott McLeod. The chapel is also available for anyone to use for prayer or meditation.

== Administration ==
The college operates under a unicameral system consisting of a board of governors. The board of governors has responsibility for the university's properties, affairs and income and determines approval for tenure and sabbatical for professors of the college.

The board of governors consists of nine ex officio members including the college's chancellor, president, the president of the University of Waterloo, the Bishop of the Diocese of Huron, one representative for the faculty and one for the staff, and the presidents of both the residence and academic student leadership committees of Renison. The other nine members of the board are elected members. One of these members must be a representative of the Anglican Diocese of Niagara and at least one member of the board must be an alumnus/alumna of Renison.

The president, appointed by the board of governors, acts as the chief executive officer of the college and is responsible for administering the affairs of the college. The president acts on behalf of the board with respect to the operational management and control of the college. The president is the chair of Academic Council as well as Student Affairs and Community Education (SACE) Council, and is a member of the board. The president is appointed for a term of five years with the possibility of renewal. The president also holds the position of vice-chancellor of the college, assuming the duties of the chancellor during his/her absence or temporary vacancy in the office. The current president and vice-chancellor is The Rev. Dr. Marc Jerry who began his term as the twelfth president (formerly called principal) of the college in July, 2024.

The chancellor, who serves as the titular head of the college, is elected by the members of the board for a term of four years with the possibility of renewal. The primary duty of the chancellor is to preside at all Renison convocations, and grant honours to candidates on behalf of the college at Founders Day. The office of the Chancellor is currently vacant.

The visitor to the college is the bishop of the Anglican Diocese of Huron, currently The Rt. Rev. R. Todd Townshend, Th.D. The visitor is a member of the corporation of Renison University College and maintains the right to inspect the state of the college from time to time. The Visitor maintains a seat on the board but may appoint a representative to fulfill this position. The visitor may also make comment on the state of the college to the board of governors and/or the president.

=== Title change ===
As of January 25, 2017, the title of the head administrator of the college was changed by the board of governors from principal to president. This was done to clarify the role of the president as the head of a university college when travelling abroad. The title of president was felt to be more universally recognized.

== Academics ==
Renison focuses its academic work in three primary areas: Social Engagement and Innovation; Global Engagement through Languages and Cultures; and Community Engagement through the offering of non-degree program and praxis-based learning related to various degrees. Renison's social engagement and Innovation focus is developed in the work of the department of Social Development Studies and Renison's School of Social Work. The focus on global engagements finds expression in a variety of forms, most notably through the work of the department of Culture and Language Studies and the Studies in Islam program unit. Its focus on Community Engagement is gathered in the Centre for Community and Professional Education.

=== Liberal arts ===
Renison University College offers courses and undergraduate programs in the liberal arts, the humanities, and the social sciences for credit towards a Bachelor of Arts degree from the University of Waterloo.

==== Social development studies ====
Social development studies is a multi-faceted Bachelor of Arts program that provides a well-rounded background in the social sciences and gives students the knowledge and skills to promote and implement social change. It prepares students for a breadth of careers, including social work, education, communications, law, and working in community and international service organizations. The program can be completed full-time or part-time, through on-campus, online and mixed delivery.

==== Culture and language studies ====
The culture and language studies (CLS) department offers academic minors towards degrees granted by the University of Waterloo in Applied Language Studies, East Asian Studies, and Studies in Islam. The department also offers a variety of certificates and diplomas, offering degree credit courses in Applied Language Studies, Arabic, Chinese, East Asian Studies, English for Multilingual Speakers, Japanese, and Korean that contribute to these programs. The CLS department also supports Renison and University of Waterloo students by offering credit courses in English, Fine Arts, History, and Religious Studies.

=== School of Social Work ===
Renison maintains a School of Social Work through which students can obtain a Bachelor of Social Work (BSW) and a Master of Social Work (MSW) from the University of Waterloo.

==== Bachelor of Social Work ====
The Bachelor of Social Work is offered as a full-time or part-time professional, generalist degree program. The program prepares students for ethical, critically reflective, anti-oppressive, competent and accountable social work practice. Field practicums are a requirement of the program in addition to in-class lectures.

==== Master of Social Work ====
The Master of Social Work is Canada's first health-focused, online Master of Social Work (MSW) program. The MSW Program is being offered for full-time or part-time study in collaboration with the Faculty of Health Sciences at the University of Waterloo. A Bachelor of Social Work (BSW) degree is a mandatory entrance requirement.

=== Centre for Community and Professional Education ===
The Centre for Community and Professional Education (CAPE) was founded in 2015 through the unification of various institutes and programs within the Renison community including the English Language Institute, the Renison Institute of Ministry, the Renison International Office, the Confucius Institute, the King Sejong Institute, Sakura Japanese language school, and Japanese non-credit courses.

CAPE offers non-credit courses, workshops as well as special events and programs that explore topics such as language, culture, and spirituality. These are all available for the community at large and do not require enrollment for a degree at the University of Waterloo. Included among the courses is "Reconciliation: Discussions and Implications for Settler Peoples in Canada" taught by Kelly Laurila since 2018.

==== Lifelong language learning ====
The lifelong language learning (LLL) program within CAPE offers an array of non-credit language and culture courses offered by Chinese program coordinators, the King Sejong Institute (KSI), and Japanese program coordinators; these courses cover a wide array of topics from basic language acquisition to traditional medicine to Japanese manga.

==== Renison Institute of Ministry ====
The Renison Institute of Ministry (RIM) offers theologically and biblically based courses, workshops, and events. They cover a variety of topics including but not limited to: topical issues such as physician assisted dying and water justice; pastoral care, preaching, congregational development, church history, biblical studies, theology, spirituality; and multi-faith dialogues. Participants can earn a Certificate in Christian Studies or a Licentiate in Theology (in partnership with Huron University College).

==== Renison International Office ====
The Renison International Office (RIO) offers opportunities for students wanting to study abroad as well as an array of customizable programs. In addition, RIO is also a certified International English Language Testing System (IELTS) testing centre.

==== English Language Institute ====
Renison University College's English Language Institute (ELI) has offered high-quality English as a second language (ESL) programs and courses since 1970, and is the official English as a Second Language (ESL) provider for the University of Waterloo. Renison ELI welcomes over 1000 students per year from countries across the globe, and is a founding member of Canada's largest body for language program accreditation, Languages Canada. Renison ELI offers a variety of non-credit ESL programs, including English for Academic Success (EFAS), a rigorous academic ESL program designed to meet the English language requirement for the University of Waterloo; English for Success (EFS), a summer English immersion experience centred on English conversation and Canadian cultural experiences; and General English at Renison (GEAR), a four-week general English program designed to improve students’ reading, writing, and speaking skills. As well, Renison ELI offers the Bridge to Academic Success in English (BASE) Program, a conditional undergraduate pathway program offered in conjunction with participating faculties at the University of Waterloo. In Fall 2024, Renison ELI also launched its Go Abroad: Learning for Sustainability (GOALS) Program.

== Student experience and housing ==
=== Residence ===
Renison can house up to 214 students per term. The college's residence consists of 10 floors, each with its own residence don and an average of 21 residents. There are both double-occupancy and single-occupancy rooms available. There are a variety of student lounges available that make for quiet study space and activity space.

Meals are provided in house with a cafeteria providing three meals a day during the week and brunch and dinner on weekends. Bagged lunches are available on request for students that are unable to return to the college for lunch. All meal costs are included in residence fees and, as such, do not have a decreasing balance of meal plan money to monitor.

==== Residence don team ====
Dons are upper-year students who live in the residence and support Renison's Student Experience and Housing team in their work of providing support to students, facilitating recreation programming, facility supervision, and rule enforcement. Dons are the primary point of contact for all residents whether it is asking for assistance, resolving conflict, responding to emergencies, or planning floor events. Renison's residence has the distinction of having the lowest don-to-student ratio on campus (1 to 21).

=== Student leadership committees ===
In Fall 2024, Renison repositioned its student government councils into student leadership committees, reframing these student volunteer opportunities as a chance for all students to build and develop their leadership skills without fear of needing to possess any prior student governance experience.

==== Renisix (residence student leadership committee) ====
Renisix is tasked with enhancing the social atmosphere of the college for those who live in its residence halls. A student-run leadership team headed by a peer leader, Renisix gives students the opportunity to take ownership of their residence experience and provide opportunities for students to have fun and meet others in the college.

==== Renison Academic Student Committee (RASC) ====
The Renison Academic Student Committee (RASC) (formerly known as the Renison Academic Student Council) is a student-led initiative composed of undergraduate, Renison-registered students who take courses on campus. The goals of RASC are to provide opportunities for service learning to Renison students and to support students’ mental health wellness via outreach initiatives.

==== Social Development Studies Student Society ====
As a student society, the Social Development Studies (SDS) Society works to better the student experience of those students in the Social Development Studies program. The group is currently on hiatus.

=== Living-learning communities ===
==== Social Development Studies Living-Learning Community ====
The Social Development Studies (SDS) Living-Learning Community aims to help first year students living at Renison navigate the academic landscape of their first year of university. Working under the supervision of Renison's Student Life Coordinator and in collaboration with faculty and staff in the SDS department, Peer Leaders’ responsibilities include: providing learning opportunities that complement in-class studies, establishing informal relationships between students and faculty, providing academic related programming, and advising students on how to have a positive, healthy and successful residence and university experience.

==== Warrior Academic Leadership Community ====
In 2012, Renison and the University of Waterloo Department of Athletics formed a partnership to house varsity athletes at Renison and to create a living-learning community that is best suited for varsity athletes, now known as Warrior Academic Leadership Community (WALC). The athletes are grouped in residence so that it is easy to find other athletes with similar interests with equally demanding schedules. Peer Leaders’ responsibilities include: providing learning opportunities that complement in-class studies, helping athletes become involved in Renison Residence community events, providing support for academic success, and acting as a resource to assist with athletic or personal concerns. A WALC Scholarship of $1000 was developed that is awarded to 5 members of the community with the highest academic average after their first term on a full-time course load.

==== Bridge to Academic Success in English (BASE) Living-Learning Community ====
The Bridge to Academic Success in English (BASE) Living-Learning Community supports English language learners in their cultural adjustment and navigating life in a North American university. The Living-Learning Community is known for hosting BASE Family Dinner social events, social hours, and study sessions, for the BASE students.

=== English Language Institute peer leaders ===
The English Language Institute (ELI) hires a number of peer leaders each year to oversee their wide range of language programs. Peer Leaders provide leadership for students studying in all programs. ELI Peer Leaders specifically support students studying in the English For Academic Success (EFAS), General English at Renison (GEAR), and Bridge to Academic Success in English (BASE) program. EFS Peer Leaders support the English For Success (EFS) program, Exploring Science Peer Leaders support students in the 3-week Exploring Science summer program, in addition to Business Language & Leadership Program (BLLP) Peer Leaders.

Peer Leaders are responsible for facilitating weekly activities and conversation social events with the students to help them build their language skills. Peer Leaders for EFAS and BASE also provide academic skill support, called "meet-ups", where students can meet one-on-one with their Peer Leader for support with study strategies, time management, textbook reading, mental health wellness, etc. EFAS and BASE students also attend mandatory check-in meetings twice a term with their Peer Leaders to assess their adjustment to North American studies.

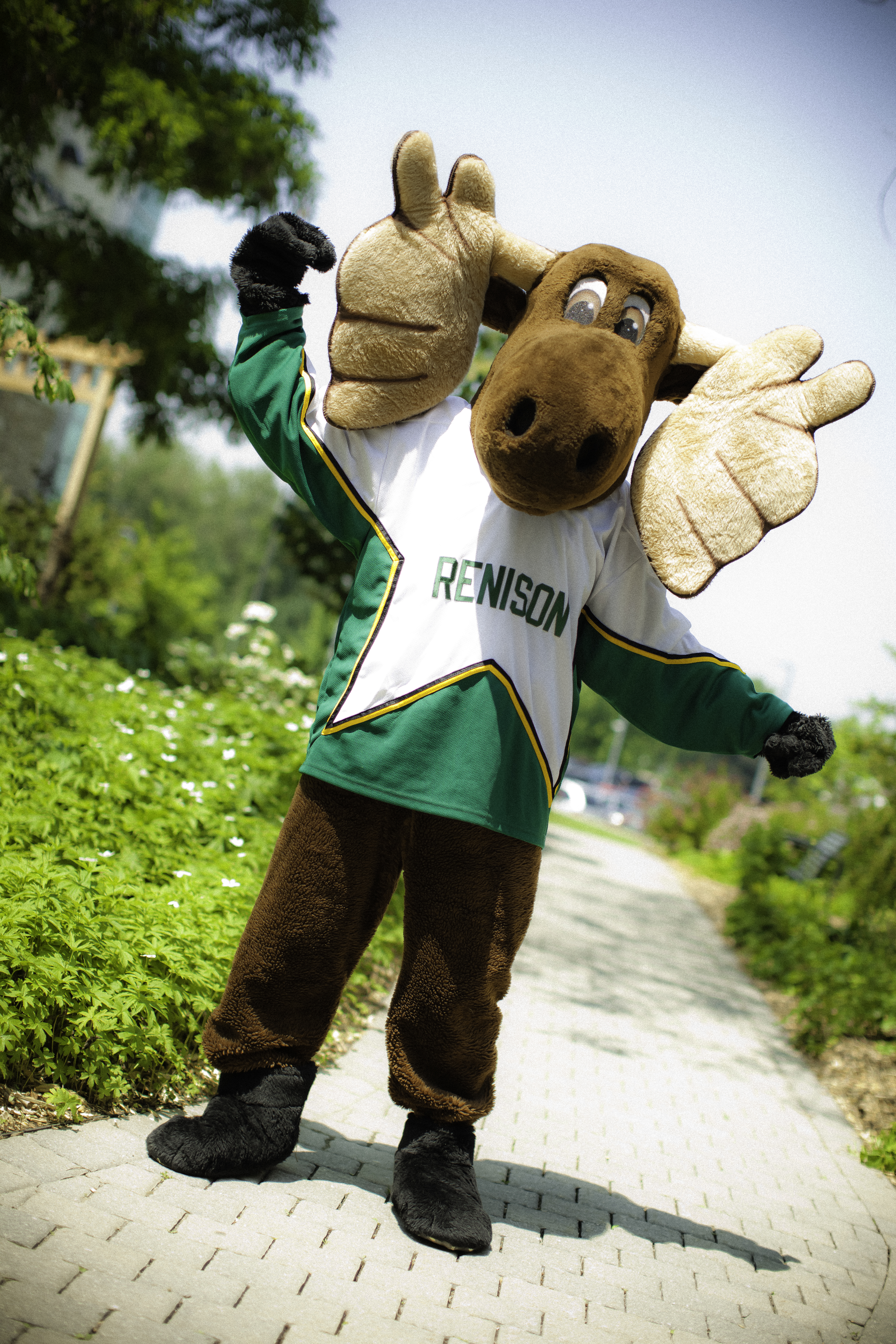
Renison's mascot, Reni Moose

== Mascot ==
Renison University College's mascot is Reni Moose. Reni has represented the college at a variety of events including Orientation Week, Waterloo Warriors hockey games, convocations, Renison's One Sky Festival, to name but a few. Renison uses a moose as its mascot as its namesake, The Most Reverend Robert Renison, was the archbishop of Moosonee. A moose is also found in the crest of Renison's coat of arms and College Badge.

Annually, Renison students celebrate Reni Moose's birthday at a celebration that happens around the date of January 14, coinciding with the date of Renison's founding.

At Renison's 40th anniversary in 1999, an inflatable moose head was introduced to the college. That fall, though a moose had long been associated with Renison, a "name the moose" contest was held which officially named Renison's mascot "Reni Moose". Part of the mythology of Renison, the critter is the subject of many "moosterious tales" told round the fireplace in the student lounge, known as the Moose Room!

== Honours granted by Renison ==
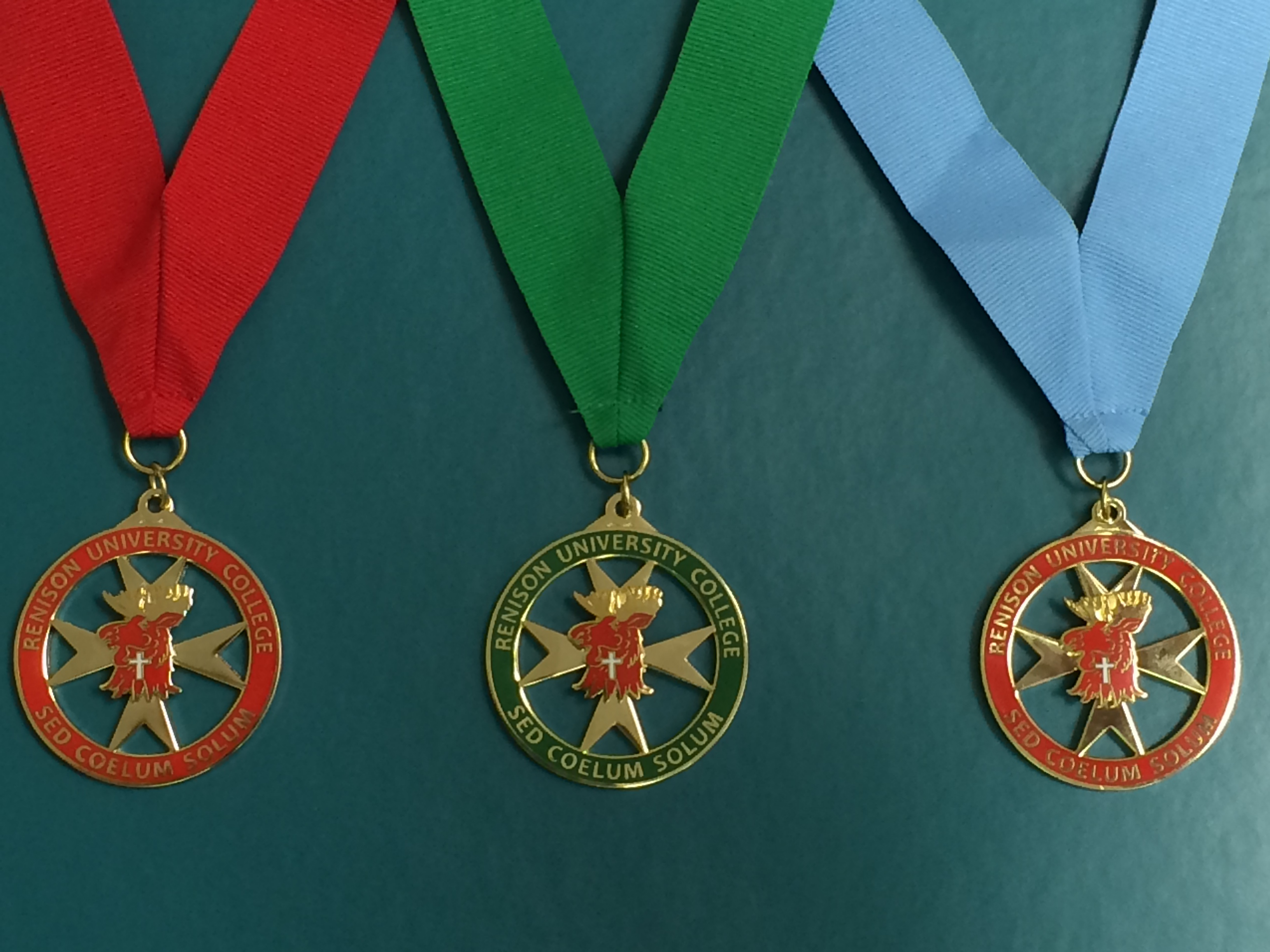
Insignia for three Renison honours

Renison University College grants several honours to individuals that have provided exceptional service to the college, to the Anglican Church, to Canada or to their community. The honours are bestowed by the chancellor at the annual Founders' Day celebration which celebrates the founders of the college and marks the founding of Renison.

=== Senior Fellow ===
Members of the regular faculty of Renison University College, the University of Waterloo, and its other federated and affiliated institutions, are eligible to receive the designation of Senior Fellow of Renison University College. The nominee must have made a substantial and noteworthy contribution to Renison University College, to his or her field, and/or to the community at large.

Insignia: Badge of the college within a circular border of green, upon which is inscribed the name and motto of the college, suspended from a green ribbon.

=== Honorary Senior Fellow ===
The Honorary Senior Fellowship is Renison University College's equivalent to honorary doctorates awarded by degree-granting universities. It is granted to persons who have distinguished themselves in the wider community through their contributions to one or more of the following: Renison, the University of Waterloo, the Anglican Church, the wider community of Kitchener-Waterloo, Ontario, Canada, or the world, and may have some affinity with the college. This honour may also be granted to persons who have served as volunteers for the college.

Insignia: Badge of the college within a circular border of red, upon which is inscribed the name and motto of the college, suspended from a red ribbon.

=== Honorary Member ===
Honorary Membership is normally granted to members of the staff of Renison University College, the University of Waterloo, or the other Affiliated and Federated Institutions of Waterloo. The nominee must have made noteworthy contributions to Renison over an extended period of time during his or her employment at the college, the University of Waterloo, or the other university/colleges on campus.

Insignia: Badge of the college within a circular border of pale blue, upon which is inscribed the name and motto of the college, suspended from a pale blue ribbon.

=== Distinguished Alumnus/Alumna Award ===
The designation Distinguished Alumnus or Alumna is granted to persons who, having graduated from academic programs administered by the college or lived in residence at Renison for two terms within one academic year, have pursued and gained notable recognition in a subsequent career.

Insignia: Badge of the college within a circular border of green, upon which is inscribed the name and motto of the college, suspended from a gold ribbon.

=== Teaching Excellence Award ===
The Teaching Excellence Award recognizes excellent teaching in a given year for presenters of at least one credit course offered by Renison University College. The nominee for this award must have received excellent teaching evaluations from the academic dean and/or the president, for teaching in at least one credit course offered by the college. Other indicators of teaching excellence may be cited, including, but not exclusively, performance in formal or informal tutorial situations, preparation and use of outstanding teaching materials, etc.

=== Chancellor or president emeritus ===
Upon the completion of their service at Renison University College, a chancellor or president may be provided by the board of governors with the honorary designation of chancellor emeritus or president emeritus. This designation is not automatic but granted only after approval by the board of governors. This designation is to be a rare honour bestowed for the most significant and noteworthy service to the college.

Insignia: Badge of the college within a circular border of red, upon which is inscribed the name and motto of the college, suspended from a purple ribbon.

=== Founder ===
The designation of ‘founder’ has only been granted to those whose names appear on the incorporating Letters Patent of the college.

Insignia: Badge of the college within a circular border of dark blue, upon which is inscribed the name and motto of the college, suspended from a dark blue ribbon.

== Coat of arms and other insignia ==
Coat of arms of Renison University College
Notes The coat of arms and motto of The Most Rev. Robert Renison was used by the College with permission from the Archbishop’s family until the college was granted its own arms. Adopted 1978 Crest A moose's head erased Gules attired Or and charged on the neck with a passion cross Argent Escutcheon Argent, on a bend vert between two maple leaves Gules, a bishop's mitre between two Maltese crosses Or, all within a bordure of the Second charged with three buckles between three maple leaves Or Supporters Dexter a beaver proper sinister a lion Gules, each collared Or pendent therefrom a wagon wheel composed of a cross potent Or conjoined with a saltire potent Azure surmounted by a plate bearing the letters IHS Sable Compartment A grassy mount Vert strewn with trillium flowers and maple keys Or Motto Sed Coelum Solum; This latin motto was originally granted to Bishop Renison but was allowed for use by the College. Archbishop Renison’s preferred translation of this motto was “One Sky Over All”. Banner A banner of the arms of Renison University College Badge On a Maltese Cross Or a moose's head erased Gules attired Or and charged on the neck with a passion cross Argent Symbolism Bishop Renison’s arms were incorporated into Renison University College’s unique shield to create what is known as a differenced arms. Granted by the Lord Lyon King of Arms in Scotland in 1978, the College added to the design with a green border placed around the perimeter of the archbishop’s shield. On this green border are three gold maple leaves and three gold buckles. The buckles were borrowed from the arms of The Ven. Archie Skirving, Chair of the Board of Governors at the time of the grant. The crest of the College’s arms was granted in 1984 by the Lord Lyon King of Arms. Like Archbishop Renison's crest, the College's crest is also a red moose with gold antlers. The moose head faces forward and features a white ‘passion cross’ on the neck of the moose. This cross was borrowed from the arms of Ian Campbell, Principal and Vice-Chancellor of Renison at the time of the grant. The supporters of the College's arms were granted in 2014 by the Canadian Heraldic Authority. The red lion on the right is taken from the arms of the University of Waterloo, and thus symbolizes Renison's affiliation with the university. The red lion is also found in the arms of Bishop D. Ralph Spence, Chancellor of the College at the time of the grant. The beaver is taken from the arms of the Anglican Diocese of Huron, the Bishop of which is the Visitor to the College. The wagon wheel is taken from the arms of the Church of the Holy Saviour, Waterloo, the founding parish of the College. The grassy green mount represents Renison's verdant campus. The trilliums recall the college's location in Ontario and the Regional Municipality of Waterloo, because they are the provincial flower and are found in the Region's arms. The maple keys symbolize the ten founders of the College and their vision that those being educated will grow and develop for the benefit of their communities. The badge of the College features the College crest – a red moose with gold antlers and a white cross on its neck – on a gold Maltese cross. This was granted in 1990 by the Canadian Heraldic Authority and painted by Renison alumnus and Honorary Senior Fellow, The Rev. Canon David Bowyer. Previous versions Coat of Arms of The Most Rev. Robert Renison Coat of Arms of Renison University College (1984-2014)

∗All heraldic devices belonging to Renison University College have been registered with the Canadian Heraldic Authority.

== Convocation regalia ==
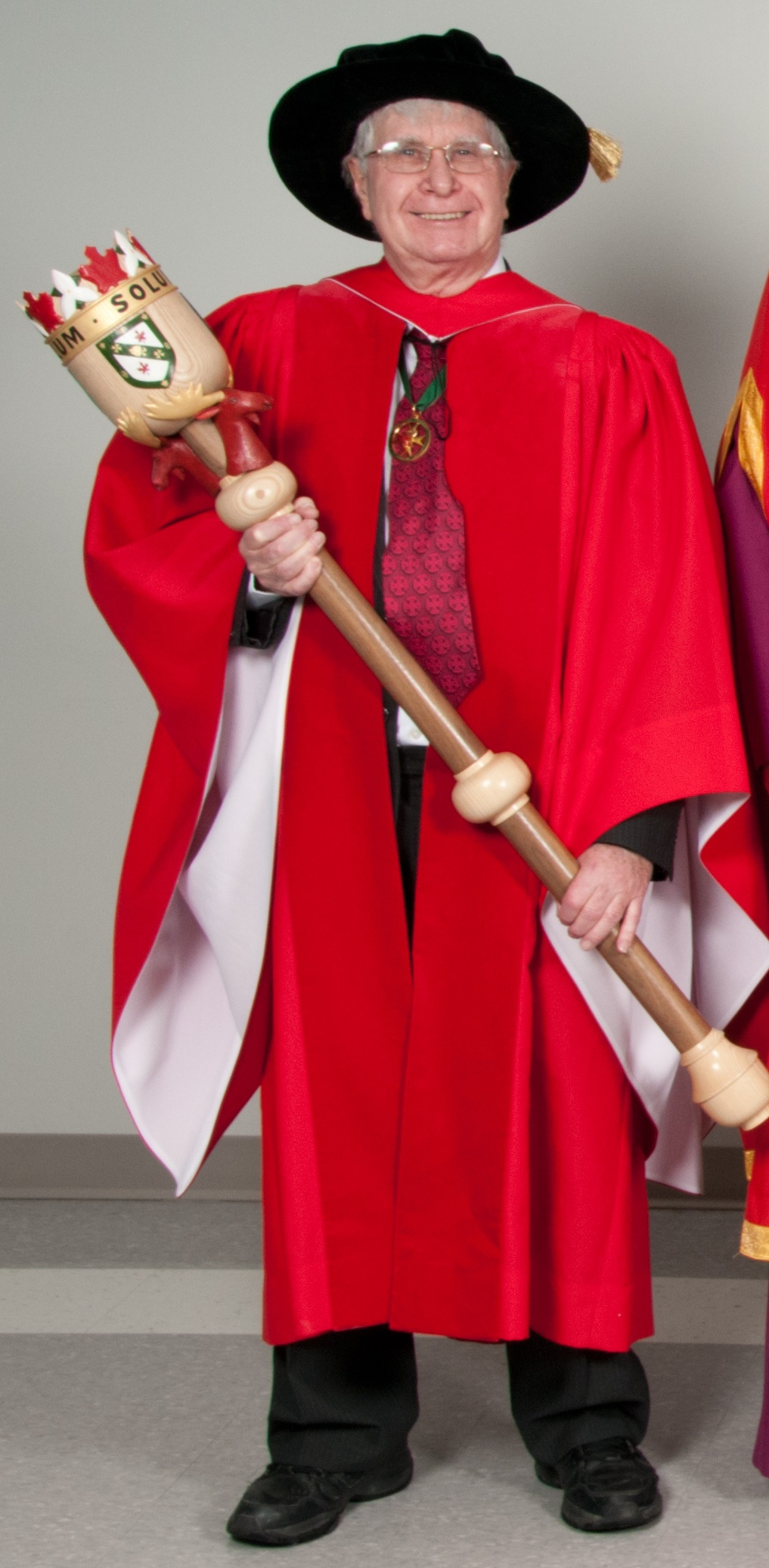
Dr. Michael Smyth, senior fellow of Renison University College, carrying the college mace

Renison's convocation regalia, a mace and two staves, were gifts to the college by D. Ralph Spence and Mrs. Carol Spence on the occasion of Bishop Spence's Installation as Renison's eighth chancellor.

=== Mace ===
Maces have been used to symbolize authority and order since early medieval times. Parliaments, universities and civic governments use a mace to remind all that their right to govern and teach comes from the Crown; in Renison's case, the Crown in Right of Ontario.

Renison's mace is made of local wood from the Waterloo area and fashioned by local artisans. It follows the shape of most maces with a crown, a bowl, and a wooden shaft. The Mace is to be carried by an honoured member of the college in front of the chancellor at convocations and special ceremonies.

The crown is carved with maple leaves and trilliums, reflecting the institution of the Crown in Canada and Ontario. The bowl has three coats of arms; Renison University College, University of Waterloo, and the personal arms of Spence. Carved moose heads, derived from the crest of the coat of arms, support the bowl.

Down the shaft of the mace is the small coat of arms belonging to The Rev. Canon David Bowyer, Honorary Senior Fellow of Renison and painter of the mace.

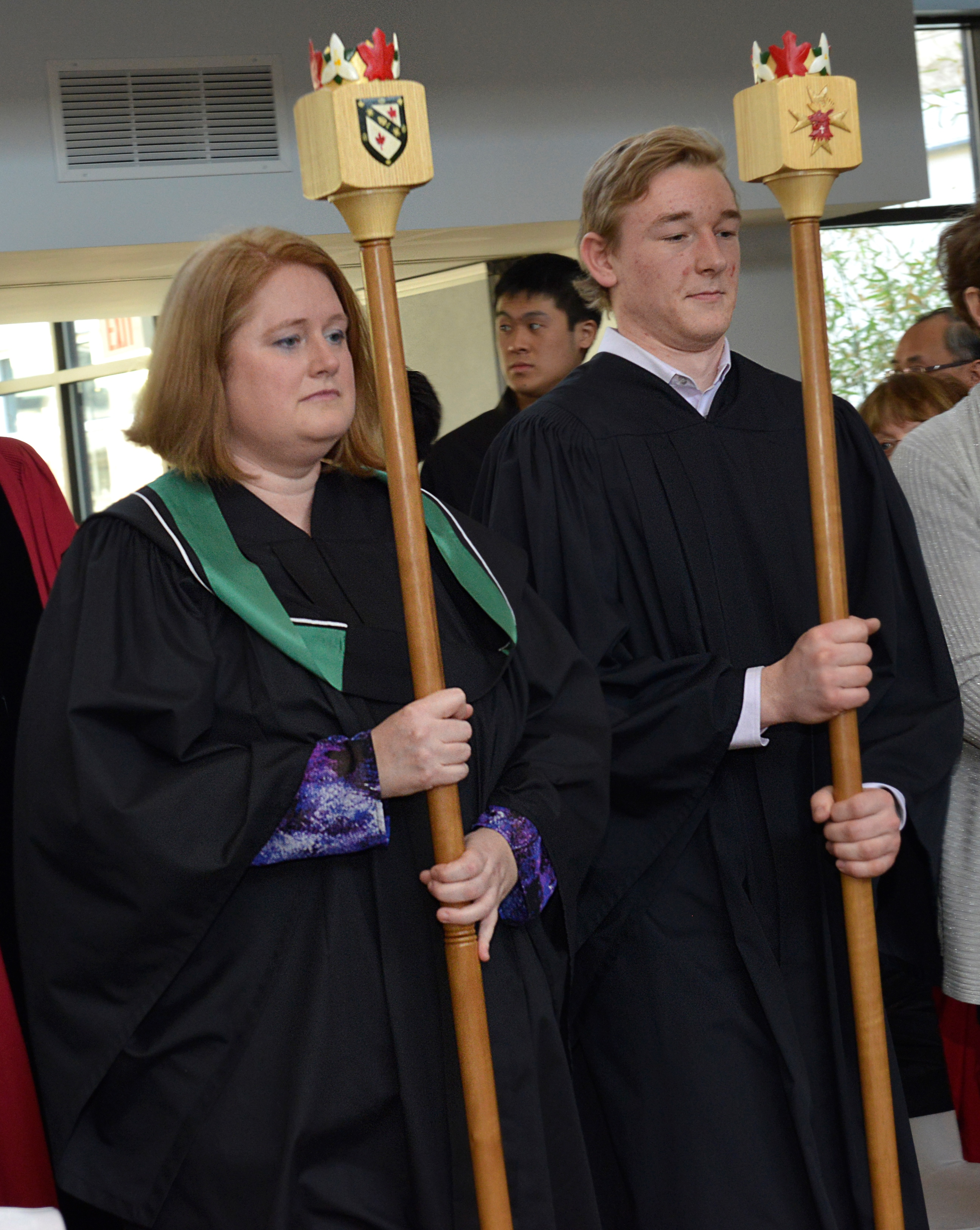
Two Renison students lead an academic procession carrying the Processional Staves

=== Staves ===
Normally carried by two students, the two Processional Staves lead the academic procession. Each bears Renison's shield and badge of the college. They represent the two halves of Renison's student body: the residents and the academic students.

=== Convocation robes ===
==== Chancellor ====
The chancellor of Renison University College wears red and maroon robes with gold braiding, in addition to a maroon Tudor bonnet with a gold cord and tassel. The colour gold is used to indicate the chancellor's senior position in the college.

==== President and vice-chancellor ====
The president and vice-chancellor of Renison University College wears red-and-maroon robes with silver braiding, in addition to a maroon Tudor bonnet with a silver cord and tassel. The colour silver indicates the president and vice-chancellor's secondary position in the hierarchy of the college.

==== Chair of the board of governors ====
The chair of the board of governors of Renison University College wears green robes with gold braiding.

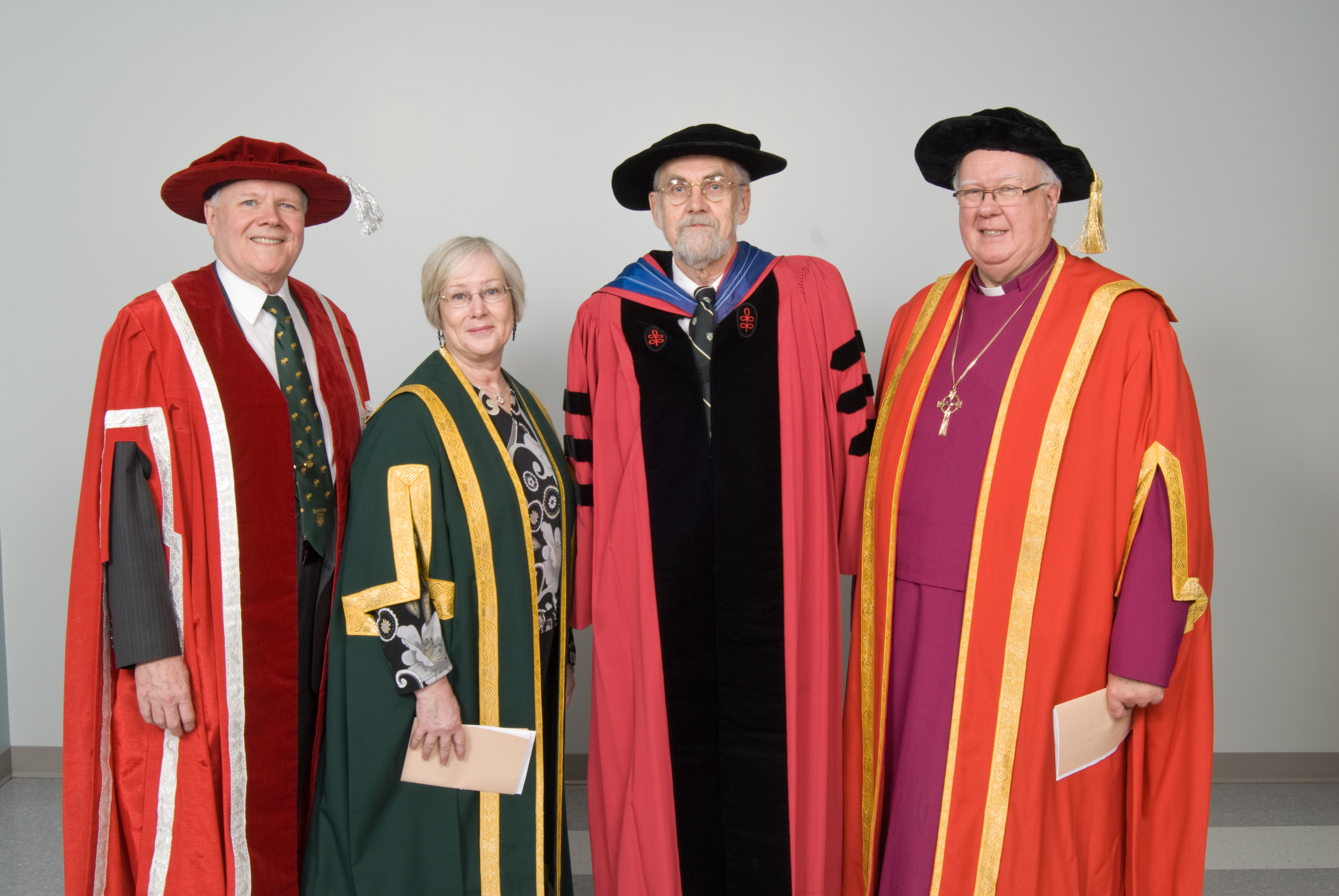
L-R: Dr. Glenn F. Cartwright, former principal and vice-chancellor; Lynn Schumacher, former chair of the board of governors; Prof. Darrol Bryant; Ralph Spence, former chancellor and present chancellor emeritus

== See also ==
=== Books ===
- Dr. Gail Cuthbert Brandt 'Bold and Courageous Dreams' Renison University College © 2008
- Dr. Kenneth McLaughlin 'Enthusiasm for the Truth: An Illustrated History of Saint Jerome's University', (Waterloo: University of Waterloo Press © 2002)
- Dr. Kenneth McLaughlin 'Waterloo: The Unconventional Founding of an Unconventional University' (Waterloo: University of Waterloo Press © 1997)
- Dr. Kenneth McLaughlin 'Out of the Shadow of Orthodoxy: Waterloo @ 50' (Waterloo: University of Waterloo Press © 2007)
- Professor Brian McKillop, 'Matters of Mind: The University in Ontario, 1791-1951' (Ottawa: University of Ottawa Press ©1951)
