= Kelly Laurila =

Canadian academic and Indigenous rights advocate

Academic background
- Education: University of Waterloo (B.A.); Brock University (B.Ed); South Texas State University (M.Ed); Wilfrid Laurier University (MSW & PhD)
- Thesis: Reconciliation: Facilitating ethical space between Indigenous women and girls of a drum circle and white, Settler men of a police chorus (2018)
- Doctoral advisor: Kathy Absolon-King

Kelly Laurila is a Canadian academic and Indigenous rights advocate known for research and teaching related to Indigenous peoples in Canada and settler engagement with the outputs of the Truth and Reconciliation Commission of Canada.

== Early life and education ==
Laurila was born and raised in northern Ontario and is of Sámi and Irish ancestry. She moved to southern Ontario in 1980, where she reconnected with her Indigenous heritage. She has spent several decades learning the teachings of Indigenous peoples in Canada, most notably the Anishinaabe.

Laurila studied psychology at the University of Waterloo before pursuing a Bachelor of Education at Brock University. She holds a Master of Education from South Texas State University and a Master of Social Work from Wilfrid Laurier University, and obtained a PhD at Laurier in 2018. The focus of her doctoral research focused on Indigenous peoples in Canada.

== Career ==
Laurila is an instructor with Laurier's Faculty of Social Work. She also teaches in Renison University College's School of Social Work. Since 2018 Laurila has taught "Reconciliation: Discussions and Implications for Settler Peoples in Canada", a non-credit course offered by Renison. The central focus of the course is the final report of the Truth and Reconciliation Commission of Canada and was developed based on Laurila's realization that Canadians don't always understand the need for reconciliation. Prior to pursuing an MSW, she worked as a counsellor at Conestoga College for more than a decade.

Laurila took over from Jean Becker as the songcarrier for Mino Ode Kwewak N’gamowak (Good Hearted Women Singers) in 2006. Founded in 2003, and composed of predominantly of First Nations women, the group met weekly to drum and sing. Building on the teachings Becker brought to the group, Laurila expanded its scope into the community, leading public performances and building relationships with non-Indigenous communities including a police choir. The group received the Waterloo Regional Heritage Foundation Award of Excellence in 2016.

== Select publications ==
- Laurila, Kelly; Carey, Kevin Christopher (30 March 2022). "Rethinking Freedom: A Framework for the Implementation of Ethical Space in the Academy". Educational Studies. 58 (2): 200–224. doi:10.1080/00131946.2022.2051027. ISSN 0013-1946. S2CID 247889710.
- Laurila, Kelly (2021). "Song as the Catalyst that Promotes Envisioning Ethical Spaces". In Willingham, Lee (ed.). Community music at the boundaries. Waterloo, Ontario, Canada. ISBN 9781771124577.
- Laurila, Kelly (28 September 2020). "The Ethical Space of Engagement Between Indigenous Women and Girls of a Drum Circle and White, Settler Men of a Police Chorus: Implications for Policing Ideology, Policies, and Practices". Journal of Leadership, Accountability and Ethics. 17 (4). doi:10.33423/jlae.v17i4.3095.
- Laurila, Kelly; Willingham, Lee (1 July 2017). "Drum circles and community music: Reconciling the difference". International Journal of Community Music. 10 (2): 139–156. doi:10.1386/ijcm.10.2.139_1.
