= Ray Beverley =

Alton Ray Beverley (1884–1956) was the 6th Bishop of Toronto.

Educated at the University of Toronto, he was ordained in 1908. He began his career as a curate at St Paul's, Halifax, Nova Scotia. He was Rector of Trinity Church, Quebec from 1910 to 1919 and Vicar of Trinity Church, Barrie until 1934 when he became Suffragan Bishop of Toronto, a post he held until 1947. In that year he became its diocesan bishop, retiring in 1955. He died a few months later.

Religious titles
Preceded by Derwyn Trevor Owen	Bishop of Toronto; 1947–1955	Succeeded by Frederick Hugh Wilkinson
