= James Watton =

Canadian Anglican bishop

James Augustus Watton (1915–1995) was a Canadian Anglican bishop in the second half of the 20th century.

== Life and career ==
Watton was born on 23 October 1915, educated at the University of Western Ontario and ordained in 1939. He held curacies at Lucknow, Ontario and Merlin, after which he was the incumbent of Plympton–Wyoming. After time at Geraldton, Kirkland Lake and Timmins, he became Dean of Moosonee in 1955.

In 1957, he became Rector of St John's Port Hope and in 1958 of St Michael and All Angels, Toronto. In 1963, he became the Bishop of Moosonee, a position he held until 1979, for the last five years of which he was also Metropolitan of Ontario.

He retired to Southampton, Ontario, and died on 14 August 1995, in Walkerton, Ontario, after some years of battling Alzheimers. He is buried in Southampton Cemetery, overlooking the Saugeen River where he used to fish.

Religious titles
| Preceded by Cuthbert Cooper Robinson | Bishop of Moosonee; 1963–1979 | Succeeded by Caleb James Lawrence |
| Preceded by John Charles Roper | Metropolitan of Ontario; 1974–1979 | Succeeded by Lewis Samuel Garnsworthy |
