= John Anderson (archbishop of Moosonee) =

Canadian Anglican bishop

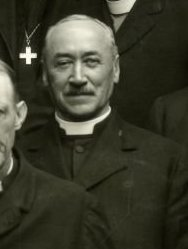
Anderson c. 1924

John George Anderson was a Canadian Anglican bishop in the 20th century.

Anderson was born at Stoneywood Orkney, Scotland, on 23 March 1866. The Land of Moosoneek, Olive Mackay Petersen.

Anderson ordained in 1889 after which he was a Church Mission Society (CMS) missionary at Long Sault and then Vicar of St Peter's Manitoba. From 1899 to 1909 he was Rural Dean of Lisgar. In 1909 he became Bishop of Moosonee, a post he held until 1943, for the last three years of which he was also Metropolitan of Ontario. He died on 15 June 1943.

Religious titles
Preceded by George Holmes	Bishop of Moosonee; 1909–1943	Succeeded by Robert Renison
Preceded by Charles Roper	Metropolitan of Ontario; 1940–1943	Succeeded by Charles Seager
