= Peter Fenty =

Canadian bishop

Peter Decourcy Fenty has been a suffragan bishop in the Anglican Diocese of Toronto, Canada since 2013: he is in charge of the York-Simcoe area of the Diocese.

Fenty was born in 1951 in Barbados. He was educated at the University of the West Indies and ordained in 1975. After a curacy at St Matthias, Barbados he held incumbencies in both Barbados and Canada and Aurora until his election as Suffragan Bishop in 2013.

Personal Life In 2020, Bishop Fenty had announced his retirnment from the bishop at York Simcoe. He is now an inactive bishop at the Diocese. More information can be found here: https://events.r20.constantcontact.com/register/eventReg?oeidk=a07eh3w608z864753d3&oseq&c&ch
