= Robert Renison =

Canadian Anglican bishop (1875–1957)

The Most Reverend Robert Renison
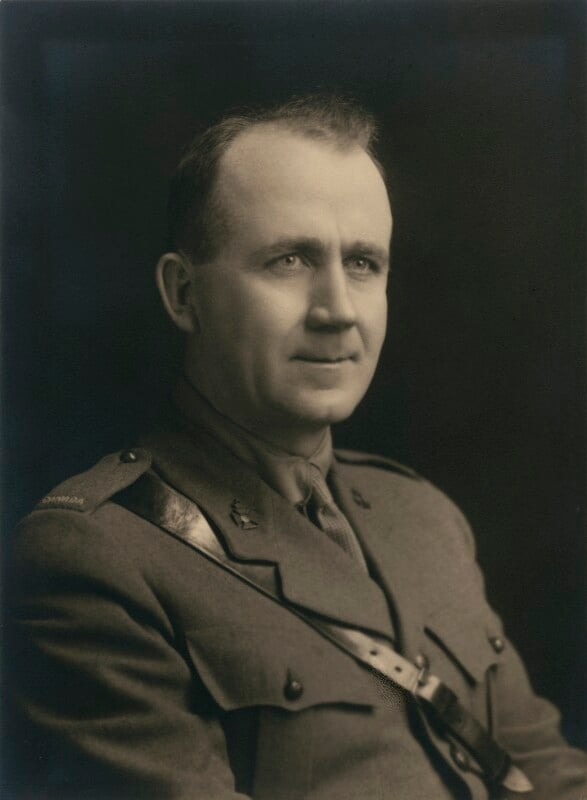
- Renison, 1914–18
- Church: Church of England in Canada
- Province: Ontario
- Diocese: Moosonee
- Installed: 1952

Orders
- Ordination: 1898 (deacon); 1899 (priest)
- Consecration: 1931 by Isaac Stringer

Personal details
- Born: Robert John Renison; 8 September 1875 Cashel, County Tipperary, Ireland
- Died: 6 October 1957 (aged 82) Toronto, Ontario, Canada
- Denomination: Anglican
- Spouse: Elisabeth Maud Bristol
- Education: University of Toronto

Robert John Renison (8 September 1875 – 6 October 1957) was an Irish-born Anglican bishop who worked in Canada.

Renison was born in Cashel, County Tipperary into an ecclesiastical family on 8 September 1875 and educated at Trinity College School and the University of Toronto. Ordained in 1896, his first position was as a curate at the Church of the Messiah, Toronto, after which he was a missionary at Fort Albany. He was the Archdeacon of Moosonee and, after World War I service, the Archdeacon of Hamilton. He was then rector of Christ Church, Vancouver until 1929 when he became Dean of New Westminster. In 1931 he was elected Bishop of Athabasca but only held the post for a year. From then until 1943 he was rector of St Paul's Toronto when he became the Bishop of Moosonee. In 1952 he became the Metropolitan of Ontario, a position he held until retirement in 1954. He died on 6 October 1957. Renison University College in Waterloo, Ontario is named after him.

== Arms ==
Coat of arms of Robert Renison
Notes Originally recorded by Sir Nevile Rodwell Wilkinson, Ulster King of Arms, 7 December 1935. Crest A moose’s head erased Gules attired Or. Escutcheon Argent on a bend Vert between two maple leaves Gules a mitre between two Maltese crosses Or. Motto Sed Coelum Solum

Anglican Communion titles
Preceded by Edwin Frederick Robins	Bishop of Athabasca; 1931–1932	Succeeded by Arthur Henry Sovereign
Preceded by John George Anderson	Bishop of Moosonee; 1943–1954	Succeeded by Cuthbert Cooper Robinson
Preceded by John Lyons	Metropolitan of Ontario; 1952–1954	Succeeded by William Lockridge Wright
