= Anne Germond =

South African-born Anglican bishop (born 1960)

The Most Reverend Anne Germond
- Archbishop of Algoma; Metropolitan of Ontario
- Church: Anglican Church of Canada
- Province: Ontario
- Diocese: Algoma, Moosonee
- Elected: 10 October 2018
- In office: 2018–present (as metropolitan 2017–present (as bishop of Algoma)
- Predecessor: Colin Johnson (as metropolitan); Stephen Andrews (as bishop of Algoma)
- Other posts: Acting Primate of Canada (2024–2025); Archbishop of Moosonee ex officio (2018–2025)

Orders
- Ordination: 2001 (diaconate); 2002 (priesthood) by Ron Ferris
- Consecration: 11 February 2017 by Colin Johnson

Personal details
- Born: 1960 (age 65–66)
- Denomination: Anglican
- Spouse: Colin Germond

Ordination history
History
Diaconal ordination
- Ordained by: Ron Ferris
- Date: February 2001
Priestly ordination
- Ordained by: Ron Ferris
- Date: May 2002
Episcopal consecration
- Consecrated by: Colin Johnson
- Date: February 11, 2017
- Place: St. Luke's Cathedral (Sault Ste. Marie, Ontario)
Episcopal succession
Bishops consecrated by Anne Germond as principal consecrator
- Todd Townshend: January 25, 2020
- Shane Parker: May 31, 2020
- Rod BrantFrancis: May 27, 2025
- Kathryn Otley: 9 May 2026

Anne Germond (born 1960) is a Canadian Anglican bishop. Since 10 October 2018, she has been metropolitan of the Ecclesiastical Province of Ontario, as well as Archbishop of Algoma and Archbishop of Moosonee, in the Anglican Church of Canada. She had been Bishop of Algoma from February 2017 until becoming its archbishop upon election as 19th Metropolitan of Ontario. She was also acting Primate of the Anglican Church of Canada for several months in 2024 and 2025.

== Early life and education ==
Germond was born in South Africa. She was educated at St. Theresa's School, Johannesburg, a convent Catholic school. She converted from Roman Catholicism to Anglicanism during high school. She and her husband, Colin Germond, migrated to Canada in 1986. Germond is a graduate of Thorneloe University's School of Theology. She was ordained as a deacon in 2001 and as a priest in 2002.

== Ordained ministry ==
Germond was the rector of the Anglican Church of the Ascension in Sudbury, Ontario, until 2016. She also held the position of archdeacon within the Deanery of Sudbury-Manitoulin. She has been the chancellor of Thorneloe University, an affiliated college of Laurentian University in Sudbury, since 2015.

She was elected as the 11th Bishop of Algoma on 14 October 2016, and consecrated and installed on 11 February 2017. Germond is the first woman to serve as the Bishop of Algoma Diocese.

On 10 October 2018, she was elected as the next metropolitan of the Province of Ontario. As metropolitan, she was also promoted to archbishop of the dioceses of Algoma and Moosonee (the metropolitan was ex officio diocesan bishop of Moosonee until 2025).

Germond is the third woman to hold the position of archbishop in the Anglican Communion and the first woman to hold the role of metropolitan of Ontario. As metropolitan, Germond oversees the Ecclesiastical Province of Ontario's synod and house of bishops.

On 15 September 2024, Germond became acting primate of the Anglican Church of Canada following the retirement of Linda Nicholls. She served in the acting role until June 2025, when the church's General Synod elected Shane Parker as primate. She announced in 2026 that she would retire in 2027 after the Diocese of Algoma elected a successor at its annual synod.

Anglican Communion titles
Preceded by Stephen Andrews	Bishop of Algoma; 2017–present	Incumbent
Preceded by Colin Johnson	Metropolitan of Ontario; 2018–present	Incumbent
Preceded by Colin Johnson	Archbishop of Moosonee ex officio 2018–2025	Succeeded by Rod BrantFrancis
Preceded by Linda Nicholls	Acting Primate of the Anglican Church of Canada; 2024–2025	Succeeded by Shane Parker
