= Fidelity (Anglican) =

Canadian organization

- Formation: c. 1996
- Dissolved: c. 2006
- Location: Canada

Fidelity was a conservative organization within the Anglican Church of Canada committed to retaining traditional understanding of human sexuality within that church. It was opposed to, but in dialogue with, Integrity Canada.

== See also ==
- Anglican Essentials Canada
