= St Paul's Pro-Cathedral (Fort Chipewyan) =

Church in Alberta, Canada

Coordinates: 58°42′52″N 111°09′30″W

St. Andrew's Cathedral was the Anglican Pro-cathedral of the former Canadian Diocese of Mackenzie River: it was in Fort Chipewyan but reverted to parish church status in 1933 when the diocese was abolished: it is the oldest Anglican church in Alberta.
