= Kevin Robertson (bishop) =

Canadian Anglican bishop (born 1971)

The Right Reverend Kevin Thomas Robertson
- Suffragan Bishop of Toronto
- Church: Anglican Church of Canada
- Province: Ontario
- Diocese: Toronto
- In office: 2017–present

Orders
- Consecration: 7 January 2017 by Colin Johnson

Personal details
- Born: May 25, 1971 (age 55)
- Denomination: Anglican
- Spouse: Mohan Sharma
- Children: 2
- Occupation: Bishop
- Education: Huron University College; Trinity College, Toronto

Kevin Robertson (born May 25, 1971) is a Canadian Anglican bishop.

== Education ==
Robertson was educated at Holy Trinity School (Richmond Hill), Huron University College in London, and Trinity College, Toronto.

== Ordination ==
Robertson was ordained a deacon at the Cathedral Church of St. James (Toronto) on May 4, 1997 and a priest at Grace Church on-the-Hill on May 10, 1998.

== Ordained ministry ==
Robertson served as assistant curate of St. Philip on-the-Hill, Unionville in 1997 and then at the Cathedral Church of St. James, Toronto from 1997 to 2000. He held three incumbencies: St. Peter, Oshawa (2000-2005), St. Nicholas, Birch Cliff (2005-2011), and Christ Church Deer Park (2011-2016).

=== Episcopal ministry ===
Robertson was elected bishop on September 17, 2016, and consecrated at St. Paul's, Bloor Street on January 7, 2017. He is responsible for approximately 80 parishes in the South and West of the Diocese of Toronto and is the link bishop to the Anglican schools within the Diocese. Robertson is the first openly gay and partnered bishop in the Anglican Church of Canada.

== Awards ==
Doctor of Divinity (honoris causa), University of Trinity College, 2018.

Doctor of Divinity (honoris causa), Huron University College, 2018.

== Marriage ==
In late December 2018, the Diocese of Toronto issued a congratulatory note to Bishop Kevin Robertson and Mr. Mohan Sharma, who were married at the Cathedral Church of St. James (Toronto) The report stated that:

"Bishop Kevin and Mohan, who have been a couple since 2009, had their relationship blessed in 2016 according to the Pastoral Guidelines of the Diocese of Toronto and are now married under the marriage provision of the same guidelines."
