= St. Matthew's Cathedral (Timmins) =

Anglican cathedral in Ontario, Canada

Coordinates: 48.2834°N 81.2010°W

St. Matthew's Cathedral is the Anglican cathedral of the Anglican Diocese of Moosonee. It is located in Timmins, Ontario, and celebrated its centenary in 2013.
