= Philip Poole (bishop) =

Canadian bishop

Maurice Philip Poole was a suffragan bishop in the Anglican Diocese of Toronto, Canada from 2005 to 2017: he was in charge of the York-Credit Valley area of the diocese.

Poole was educated at Wilfrid Laurier University and ordained in 1978. After a curacy at Holy Trinity, Thornhill he held incumbencies at Stouffville and Aurora until his election as Suffragan Bishop in 2005.

In April 2016, Poole announced that he would retire on 30 September 2016.
