= George Snell (bishop) =

Canadian bishop

George Boyd Snell (1907-2006) was the eighth Bishop of Toronto.

Born in Toronto on 17 June 1907, he was educated at Trinity College, Toronto and ordained in 1931. He was a curate at St Michael and All Angels, Toronto from 1931 to 1940 and then its Rector to 1948. From then until 1951 he was Dean of Calgary. After this he was Rector of St Clement, Eglinton and Archdeacon of Toronto until 1956 when he became Suffragan Bishop of Toronto. He was elected coadjutor bishop in 1959 and diocesan in 1966. He retired in 1972 and died on 26 December 2006. A series of lectures has been named after him.
