= Anglican Diocese of Moosonee =

Diocese of the Anglican Church in Canada

Coordinates: 48°28′31.5″N 81°17′37.5″W

Diocese of Moosonee
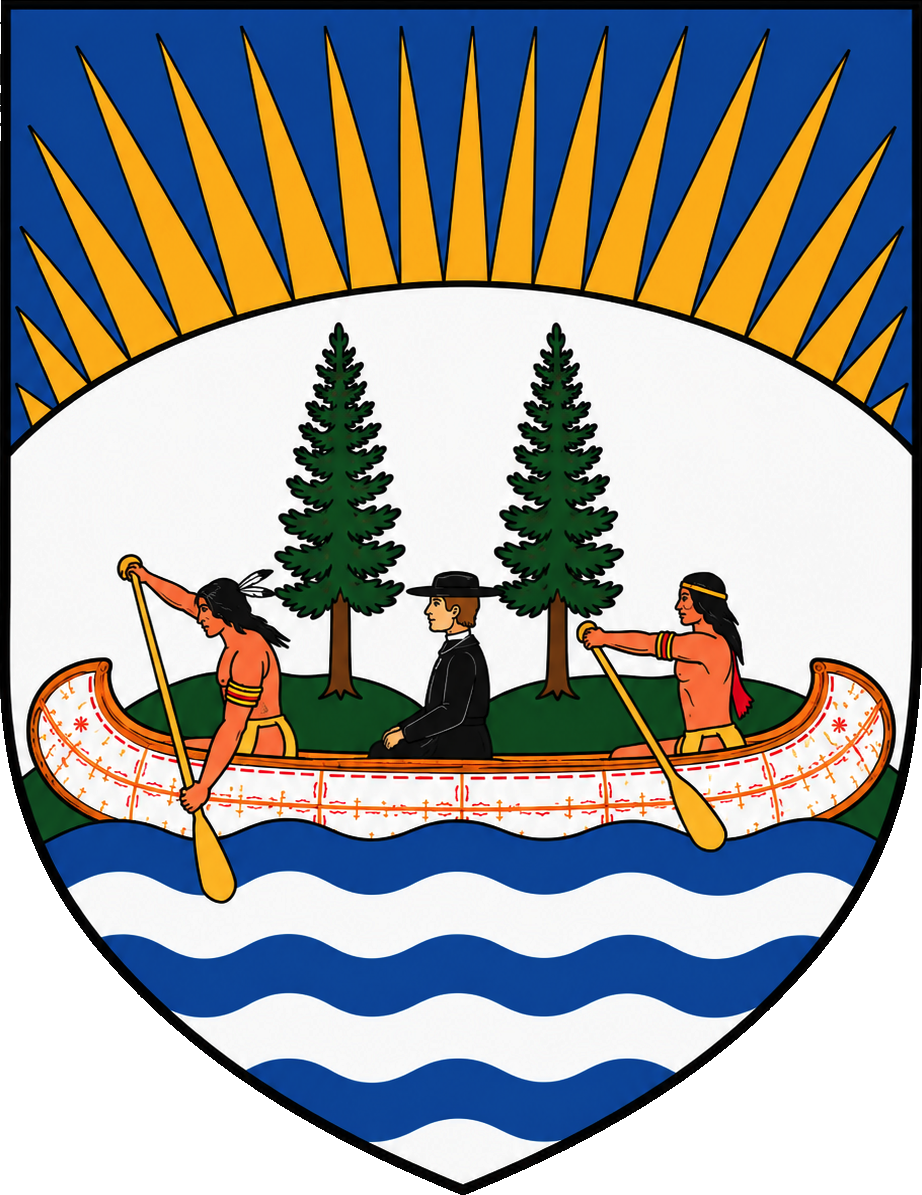
- Coat of arms

Location
- Country: Canada
- Ecclesiastical province: Ontario

Statistics
- Parishes: 21 (2022)
- Members: 14,219 (2022)

Information
- Denomination: Anglican Church of Canada
- Rite: Anglican
- Cathedral: St. Matthew's Cathedral, Timmins

Current leadership
- Bishop: Rod BrantFrancis

Map
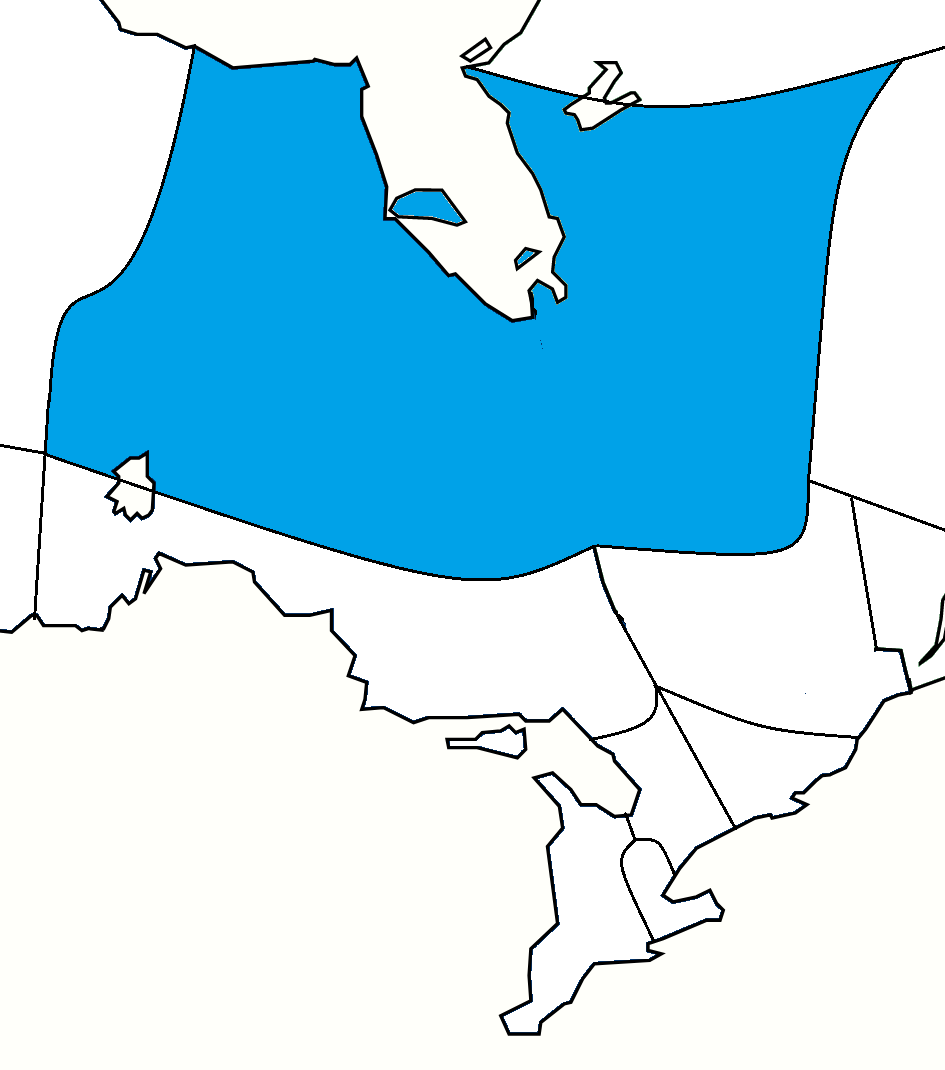
- The boundaries of the diocese within the Ecclesiastical Province of Ontario.

The Diocese of Moosonee is a diocese of the Ecclesiastical Province of Ontario of the Anglican Church of Canada.

== History ==
It was created in 1872 from part of the Diocese of Rupert's Land, in what is now the Province of the Northern Lights, and transferred in 1912 to the new Province of Ontario. Now headquartered in Timmins, Ontario, it was originally headquartered in Moose Factory. Its first bishop was John Horden.

Following the retirement of the 8th bishop of Moosonee, Caleb Lawrence, in January 2010, an election synod was held on April 10, 2010, under the chairmanship of the then metropolitan of Ontario, Colin Johnson. The synod elected Tom Corston to be the 9th bishop of Moosonee; he was consecrated as a bishop and installed as Bishop of Moosonee on July 6, 2010. He served in that position until he retired on December 31, 2013, and thereafter acted as assisting bishop.

At that point, the diocese was reorganized as a mission area of the Province of Ontario, with the metropolitan of Ontario serving ex officio (i.e. automatically) as diocesan Bishop of Moosonee. On October 10, 2018, Anne Germond became the metropolitan of Ontario and served as Bishop of Moosonee, in addition to her jurisdiction in the Diocese of Algoma. Victoria Matthews represented her as episcopal administrator.

In 2025, having returned to financial stability, the diocese elected its own bishop again. Rod BrantFrancis, a First Nations priest who had previously served in a remote Moosonee parish, was chosen and seated as the 12th bishop of Moosonee on May 28, 2025.

== Bishops of Moosonee ==
No.	Name	Dates
1	John Horden	1872–1893
2	Jervois Newnham	1893–1904 (subsequently Bishop of Saskatchewan, 1903–1921)
3	George Holmes	1905–1909
4	John Anderson	1909–1943 (Metropolitan of Ontario, 1940–1943)
5	Robert Renison	1943–1954 (Metropolitan of Ontario, 1952–1954)
6	Cooper Robinson	1955–1963
7	James Watton	1963–1980 (Metropolitan of Ontario, 1974–1979)
8	Caleb Lawrence	1980–2010 (Metropolitan of Ontario, 2004–2009)
9	Tom Corston	2010–2013
10	Colin Johnson	2014–2018 (ex officio as Metropolitan of Ontario)
11	Anne Germond	2018–2025 (ex officio as Metropolitan of Ontario)
12	Rod BrantFrancis	Since 2025

== Deans of Moosonee ==
The dean of Moosonee is also the rector of St. Matthew's Cathedral in Timmins:

- 1948–1954: Cuthbert Cooper Robinson (Bishop of Moosonee, 1955)
- 1955–1957: James Watton (Bishop of Moosonee, 1963)
- 1957–1961: S. J. Bell
- c.1974: G. Coster Scovil
- c.1977: John Fowler
- ?–?: Jerry Smith (for 5 years)
- 2007–?: Sharon Murdoch
- 2011–present: Gregory Gilson
