= Terence Finlay =

Canadian Bishop

Terence Edward Finlay (May 19, 1937 – March 20, 2017) was a Canadian Anglican bishop. He served as Metropolitan of Ontario and Archbishop of Toronto from 2000 to 2004.

He graduated from Huron University College at University of Western Ontario in 1959, where he became a member of the Sigma Chi fraternity. On June 30, 1962, he married Alice-Jean Cracknell in the Huron University College Chapel.

He became a priest in the Anglican Church of Canada. He was consecrated as a bishop in 1986 and appointed area bishop of the Trent-Durham episcopal area. He was elected co-adjutor bishop of Toronto in 1987 and installed as the 10th Bishop of Toronto in 1989. He became the 16th Metropolitan of Ontario and Archbishop of Toronto in October 2000. He retired in 2004.

Renison University College awarded him an Honorary Senior Fellowship in 1992. Huron University College at Western University bestowed him with its "Alumni Award of Distinction" in 2006.

In 1992 he dismissed the Reverend James Ferry for maintaining a homosexual relationship, while saying that the church had maintained "a conspiracy of silence" regarding the issue of homosexuality and the priesthood.

Finlay was disciplined by the church body for marrying a same-sex lesbian couple in 2006. He commented that he agreed with the principle of allowing same-sex marriages, and regretted his actions in 1992.
