= Anglican Diocese of Toronto =

Diocese of the Anglican Church of Canada

Coordinates: 44.300°N 79.200°W

Diocese of Toronto
- Logo

- Coat of arms

Location
- Country: Canada
- Ecclesiastical province: Ontario

Statistics
- Parishes: 178 (2022)
- Members: 37,646 (2022)

Information
- Denomination: Anglican Church of Canada
- Established: 1839
- Cathedral: The Cathedral Church of St. James, Toronto

Current leadership
- Bishop: Andrew Asbil
- Suffragans: Riscylla Shaw; Kevin Robertson

Map
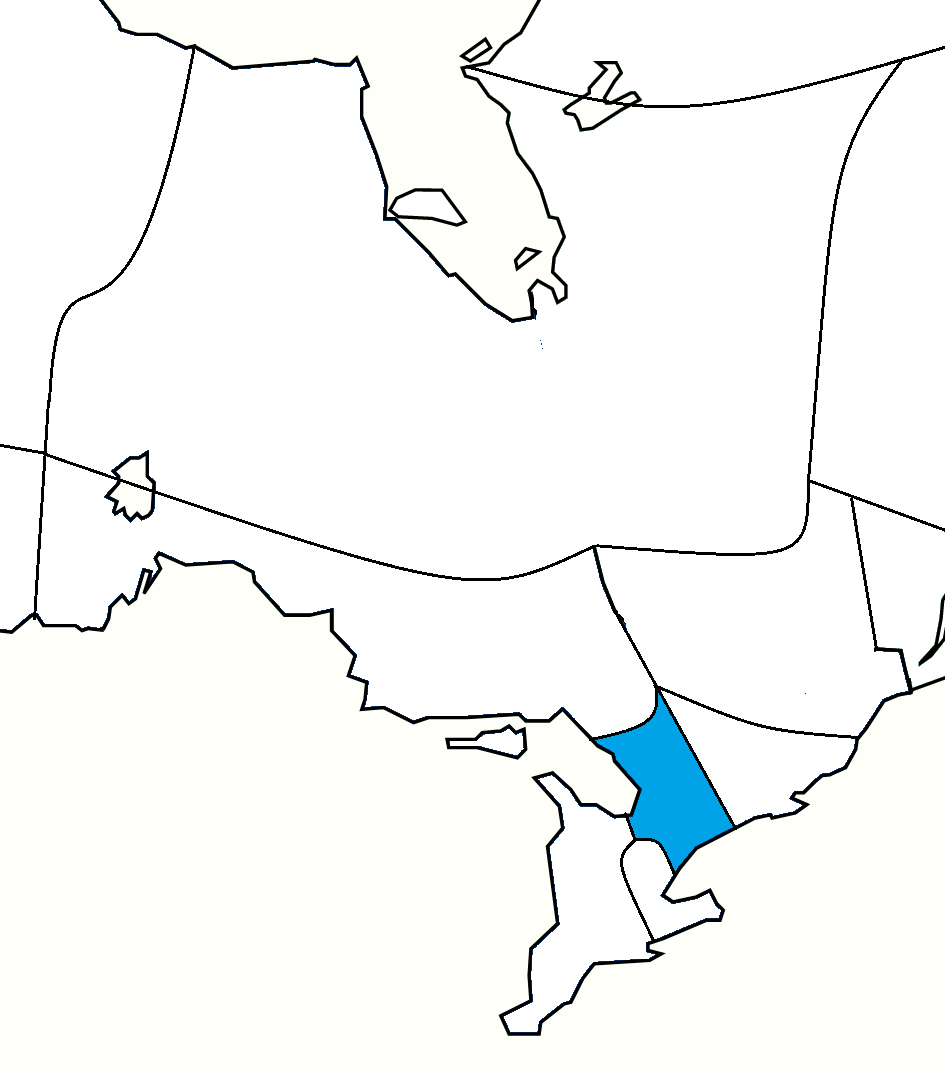
- The boundaries of the diocese within the Ecclesiastical Province of Ontario.

Website
- toronto.anglican.ca

The Diocese of Toronto is an administrative division of the Anglican Church of Canada covering the central part of southern Ontario. It was founded in 1839 and is the oldest of the seven dioceses comprising the Ecclesiastical Province of Ontario. It has the most members of any Anglican diocese in Canada. It is also one of the biggest Anglican dioceses in the Americas in terms of numbers of parishioners, clergy and parishes. As of 2018, the diocese has around 230 congregations and ministries in 183 parishes, with approximately 54,000 Anglicans identified on parish rolls.

In 1839, the area of the current Diocese of Toronto made up a fifth of what was then known as the Diocese of Upper Canada, which also comprised the current Dioceses of Huron, Ontario, Algoma and Niagara, which were respectively set apart in 1857, 1861, 1873 and 1875. In 1842, her jurisdiction was described as "Canada West" or "Upper Canada" (technically an historical term in 1842).

The Cathedral Church of St. James in Toronto is the centre of the Diocese of Toronto. The church originated as The English Church when it was first erected in 1803. It later became the seat of the Anglican bishop and was reconsecrated as the Cathedral Church of St. James in 1830. The church remained under the direction of John Strachan for most of the early nineteenth century. He was buried on the cathedral grounds in 1867.

== Bishops ==
The diocese's first bishop was John Strachan, who became Bishop of Toronto in 1839, after being ordained in the Anglican Church in 1803 and becoming Archdeacon of York in 1827. In 1848, Alexander Neil Bethune was Archdeacon of York and George O'Kill Stuart was Archdeacon of Kingston. By 1866, York was listed as the sole archdeaconry.

The current diocesan bishop of Toronto is Andrew Asbil, who has served since January 2019. He is assisted by two suffragan bishops, being The Rt. Rev'd Riscylla Shaw and the Rt. Rev'd Kevin Robertson. Shaw is Métis, and Robertson is the first openly gay and partnered bishop to be elected in Canada. The three new bishops were consecrated on January 7, 2017.

Before reforms in 2023, the Diocese was organized by episcopal area, having assigned area bishops. This arrangement was replaced by a geographical deanery, each assigned to an archdeacon. The position of area bishop was reverted to the more traditional arrangement of suffragan bishops, each functioning with delegated authority from the diocesan bishop, who retains ultimate jurisdiction for the whole diocese.

The first two women consecrated as bishops in the Anglican Church of Canada also served as suffragan bishops of Toronto: first, Victoria Matthews, elected in 1994 (for the Credit Valley area), translated to the Diocese of Edmonton as diocesan bishop in 1997 (and then became Bishop of Christchurch, New Zealand until April 2018); and second, Ann Tottenham, elected in 1997, retired in 2005, and later served as an assistant bishop in the Diocese of Niagara. Linda Nicholls was elected Suffragan Bishop of Toronto on the third ballot at an electoral synod on November 17, 2007, at St. Paul's Bloor Street. She was consecrated on February 2, 2008, at the Cathedral Church of St. James, becoming the third female Anglican bishop in the Diocese of Toronto and the fourth in the Anglican Church in Canada. She became diocesan Bishop of Huron in 2016, and was elected the first female Primate of the Anglican Church of Canada in 2019.

== Parishes ==
As of 2018, the Diocese of Toronto has around 230 congregations and ministries in 183 parishes. The cathedral of the diocese is the Cathedral Church of St. James in Toronto.

A few notable parishes include:

- Church of the Epiphany and St. Mark, Parkdale
- Church of St. Mary Magdalene
- Church of The Messiah
- Church of the Holy Trinity
- Church of the Redeemer
- Grace Church on the Hill
- Little Trinity Anglican Church
- St. Matthias Bellwoods
- St. Paul's, Bloor Street
- St. Thomas's, Huron Street
- St. James on-the-Lines, Penetanguishene

== Educational institutions ==
- Bishop Strachan School
- Havergal College
- Royal St. George's College
- Trinity College School
- University of Trinity College
- Wycliffe College

== List of Bishops of Toronto ==
1. John Strachan, 1839–1867
2. Alexander Bethune, 1867–1879
3. Arthur Sweatman, 1879–1909 (6th Metropolitan of Canada and 3rd Primate of All Canada, 1907–1909)
4. James Sweeny, 1909–1932 (4th Metropolitan of Ontario, 1932–1932)
5. Derwyn Owen, 1932–1947 (6th Primate of All Canada, 1934–1947)
6. Ray Beverley, 1947–1955 (previously Suffragan Bishop since 1934)
7. Frederick Wilkinson, 1955–1966
8. George Snell, 1966–1972
9. Lewis Garnsworthy, 1972–1989 (12th Metropolitan of Ontario, 1979–1985)
10. Terence Finlay, 1989–2004 (16th Metropolitan of Ontario, 2000–2004)
11. Colin Johnson, 2004–2018 (Metropolitan of Ontario, 2009–2018)
12. Andrew Asbil, 2019–present

== See also ==
- Dean of Toronto
- Roman Catholic Archdiocese of Toronto
- Fidelity (defunct)
- Dorian Baxter
- Integrity Toronto
- James Ferry
- Tom Harpur
- Henry Scadding
- Reg Stackhouse
- Company of the Cross
