= Ecclesiastical Province of Ontario =

Unit of the Anglican Church of Canada

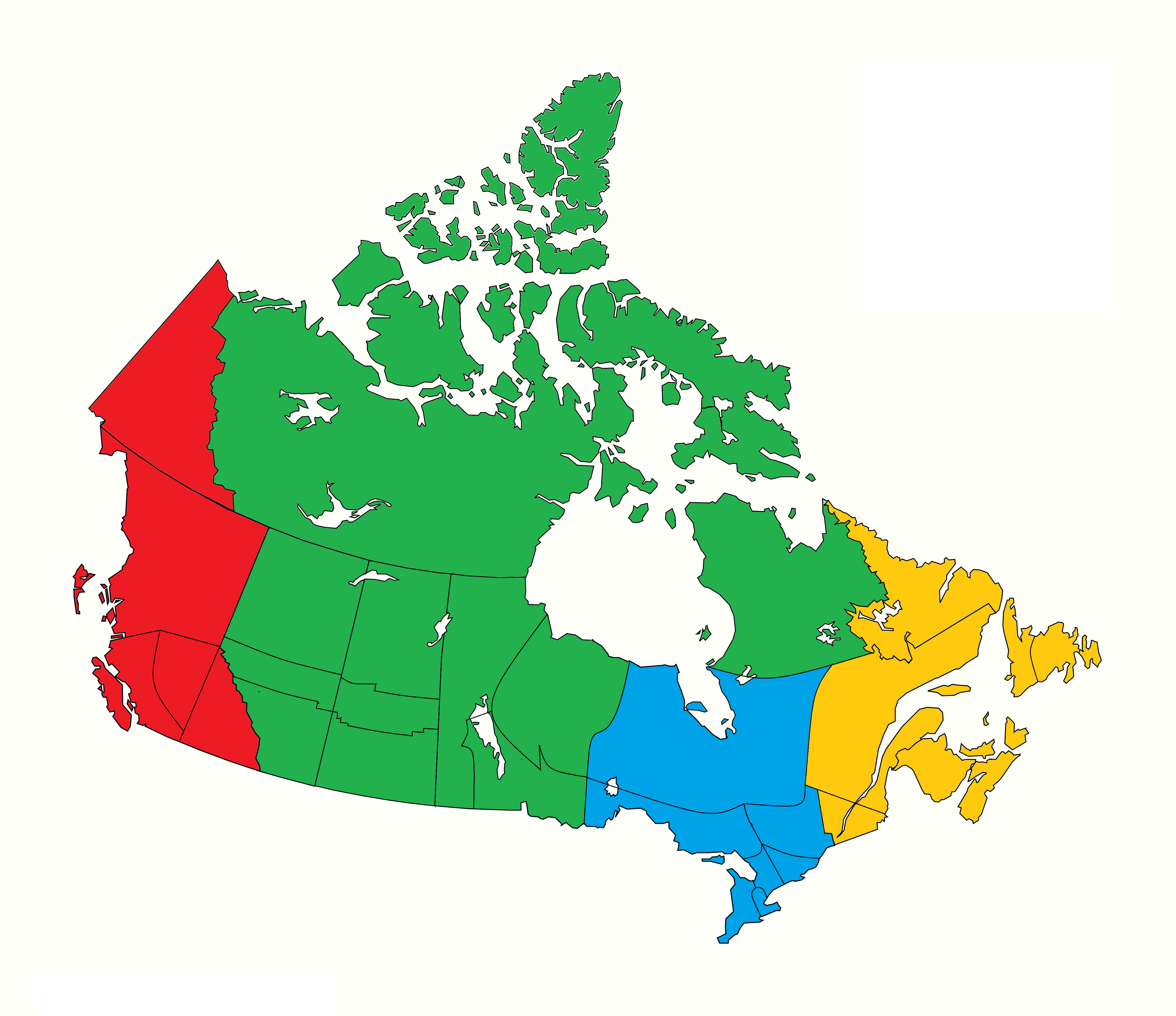
- The extent of the Province of Ontario shown in blue
- Church: Anglican Church of Canada
- Metropolitan bishop: Anne Germond
- Cathedral: St. Luke's Cathedral
- Dioceses: 7

Arms of the Ecclesiastical Province

The Ecclesiastical Province of Ontario is one of four ecclesiastical provinces in the Anglican Church of Canada. It was established in 1912 out of six dioceses of the Ecclesiastical Province of Canada located in the civil province of Ontario, and the Diocese of Moosonee from the Province of Rupert's Land.

== Overview ==
The seven dioceses are:

- Algoma (Ontario),
- Huron (Ontario),
- Moosonee (Ontario and part of northern Quebec on the coast of James Bay),
- Niagara (Ontario),
- Ontario (Ontario),
- Ottawa (Ontario and a portion of southwestern Quebec), and
- Toronto (Ontario).

Provinces of the Anglican Church of Canada are headed by a Metropolitan, who is elected from among the province's diocesan bishops. This bishop then becomes Archbishop of his or her diocese and Metropolitan of the province. Since 2014, the Metropolitan of Ontario also becomes ex officio the diocesan Bishop of Moosonee. The current Metropolitan of the Province of Ontario is Anne Germond, Archbishop of Algoma and Moosonee, who succeeded Archbishop Colin Johnson of Toronto and Moosonee in October 2018.

The Metropolitan presides at the triennial meeting of the Provincial Synod of the Ecclesiastical Province of Ontario. The next Provincial Synod will take place in 2027. In addition, the Metropolitan presides at electoral synods and the consecration of bishops in the Ecclesiastical Province of Ontario.

== Metropolitans of Ontario ==
Order	Name	Diocese	Dates
1st	Charles Hamilton	Archbishop of Ottawa	1912–1914
2nd	George Thorneloe	Archbishop of Algoma	1915–1926
3rd	David Williams	Archbishop of Huron	1926–1931
4th	James Sweeny	Archbishop of Toronto	1932–1932
5th	Charles Roper	Archbishop of Ottawa	1933–1939
6th	John Anderson	Archbishop of Moosonee	1940–1943
7th	Charles Seager	Archbishop of Huron	1944–1948
8th	John Lyons	Archbishop of Ontario	1949–1952
9th	Robert Renison	Archbishop of Moosonee	1952–1954
10th	William Wright	Archbishop of Algoma	1955–1974
11th	James Watton	Archbishop of Moosonee	1974–1979
12th	Lewis Garnsworthy	Archbishop of Toronto	1979–1985
13th	John Bothwell	Archbishop of Niagara	1985–1991
14th	Edwin Lackey	Archbishop of Ottawa	1991–1993
15th	Percy O'Driscoll	Archbishop of Huron	1993–2000
16th	Terence Finlay	Archbishop of Toronto	2000–2004
17th	Caleb Lawrence	Archbishop of Moosonee	2004–2009
18th	Colin Johnson	Archbishop of Toronto (from 2014: Archbishop of Toronto and Moosonee)	2009–2018
19th	Anne Germond	Archbishop of Algoma and Moosonee (from 2025: Archbishop of Algoma)	2018–present

== See also ==
- Ecclesiastical provinces of the Anglican Church of Canada
- List of dioceses of the Anglican Church of Canada
