= Shirley Fletcher Horn =

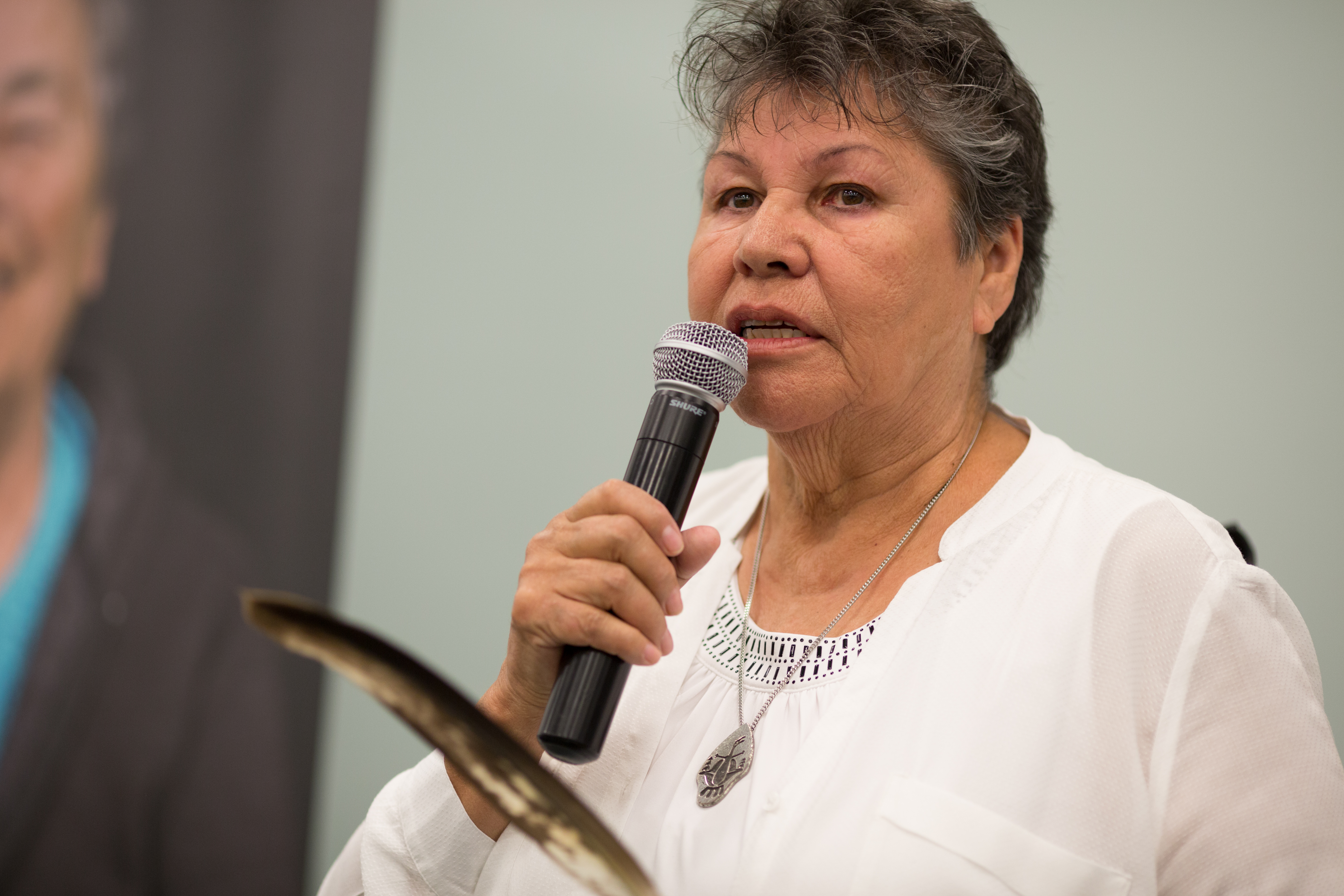
- Shirley Fletcher Horn, Shingwauk Gathering at Algoma University in 2015
- Born: Shirley Fletcher; 1940 (age 85–86); Chapleau, Ontario, Canada
- Citizenship: Cree, Canadian
- Education: Algoma University College
- Occupations: Chancellor, Algoma University. Artists
- Organization: Children of Shingwauk Alumni Association
- Known for: Residential School advocacy work, artist works.
- Parent(s): Gilbert Fletcher, Dinah Sheshequin
- Awards: Order of Ontario

Shirley Fletcher Horn is the first chancellor of Algoma University. Born in Chapleau, Ontario Horn attended the St. John's Indian Residential School (Chapleau, Ontario) and the Shingwauk Indian Residential School (Sault Ste Marie, Ontario). She is well known for her advocacy work relating to the legacy of residential schools in Canada. She is a member of Missanabie Cree First Nation and she served as Missanabie's Chief for six years.

== Personal life and education ==
Horn is one of ten children born to Dinah Sheshequin and Gilbert Fletcher. She was taken from her family home at the age of five and sent to the St. John's Indian Residential School in Chapleau, Ontario. She attended that school until the age of seven at which time she was transferred to the Shingwauk Indian Residential School. She attended residential school for a total of eight years.

Horn's reflections on her experience at Residential School have been published in The Toronto Star, University Affairs, and in other popular press. Her experience is also shared in the 2014 publication Residential Schools With The Words and Images of Survivors by Larry Loyie. Horn's experience is also documented in the forthcoming book Shirley :An Indian Residential School Story, a children's book written collaboratively by Joanne Robertson and Horn.

In 1993 Horn moved to Burnaby, British Columbia to attend the Nicola Valley Institute of Technology. In 2009 she graduated from the Bachelor of Fine Arts program at Algoma University, which is now located on the site of the former Shingwauk School. In 2015 Horn was awarded the Algoma Alumni Achievement Award.

Horn has three children: Jutta, Bonnie, and Dieter. Both Jutta and Bonnie have followed in their mother's footsteps by attending Algoma University.

== Career ==
Horn has been actively involved in the governance of Missanabie Cree First Nation. She served as the Chief of the First Nation from 1995 to 2001 and has also sat on the community's Elders Council.

Along with Michael Cachagee and others Shirley was a founding member of the Children of Shingwauk Alumni Association and the Shingwauk Education Trust. She has held many positions within the Children of Shingwauk Alumni Association include president, vice-president, heritage committee member, and executive board member.

She is also well known Cree artist and her artistic work has been exhibited both locally and provincially. In 2009, Shirley and her sister Jackie Fletcher founded the Echoes of the World Drum Festival in Sault Ste Marie, Ontario. She was one of the artists selected to participate in the Project of Heart commemoration initiative. Her sculptural contribution to this project is installed in the East Wing of Algoma University.

Since 2015 Shirley has been working with the Soulpepper theater company on their imagiNation initiative. Playwright Falen Johnson is currently working on a play chronicling the life of Horn in context of the history of Residential Schools in Canada.

On June 13, 2015 Horn was installed as the first ever Chancellor of Algoma University.

In 2016, Horn worked with Donna Hilsinger and Malgorzata Nowacka-May, Artistic Director of The Chimera Project, to create "Bears Stars and Trees" an interpretive dance art piece reflecting on the seven grandfather teachings.

Horn was the 2022 recipient of the Thomas Symons Award for Commitment to Conservation, presented by the Ontario Heritage Trust.

Horn was among the 2025 Order of Ontario appointees.
