= Krista McCracken =

Canadian public historian, educator, curator and archivist

- Education: University of Western Ontario
- Occupations: archivist, curator
- Website: kristamccracken.ca

Krista McCracken is a Canadian public historian, educator, curator and archivist known for their work raising awareness about the history of the Canadian Indian residential school system.

== Career ==
McCracken holds an MA in public history from the University of Western Ontario. They work Researcher/Curator at Arthur A. Wishart Library and Shingwauk Residential Schools Centre, an archival repository and cross-cultural education centre within Algoma University where they have worked since 2010. McCracken's research focuses on community archives, residential schools, research and access. In their role they have supported former attendees of the Shingwauk Indian Residential School in developing survivor-driven art exhibits like Reclaiming Shingwauk Hall which opened in 2018.

A book about archival practice and the work being done by the Children of Shingwauk Alumni Association and staff at Shingwauk Residential Schools Centre co-authored by McCracken and former Shingwauk Residential Schools Centre student employee Skylee-Storm Hogan was announced in January 2021 and published in August 2023. In July 2023, McCracken's co-edited publication Trans and Gender Diverse Voices in Libraries with Kalani Adolpho and Stephen G. Kruger was published Library Juice Press.

Beyond their work at Algoma University, Krista is an editor of ActiveHistory.ca and has served on the board of directors of the National Council on Public History. They also served as president of the Archives Association of Ontario from 2021 to 2022.

== Awards ==
In 2021, McCracken was the first winner of Sault Ste. Marie's Community Builders Award (Education) in recognition of their achievement in education related the outputs of the Truth and Reconciliation Commission of Canada. The same year they won the best article prize for the article "Challenging Colonial Spaces: Reconciliation and Decolonizing Work in Canadian Archives" Canadian Historical Association's Indigenous History Group.

Trans and Gender Diverse Voices in Libraries won a Choice Outstanding Academic Title award for 2024. Additionally, McCracken was named the 2024 Algoma University Thunderbird Award recipient.

== Select publications ==
- McCracken, Krista (1 March 2015). "Community Archival Practice: Indigenous Grassroots Collaboration at the Shingwauk Residential Schools Centre". The American Archivist. 78 (1): 181–191. doi:10.17723/0360-9081.78.1.181.
- Eidinger, Andrea; McCracken, Krista (3 April 2019). Beyond The Lecture: Innovations in Teaching Canadian History. ISBN 9781999020101.
- Mccracken, Krista (May 2019). "Challenging Colonial Spaces: Reconciliation and Decolonizing Work in Canadian Archives". Canadian Historical Review. 100 (2): 182–201. doi:10.3138/chr.2018-0033. S2CID 182084700.
- McCracken, Krista; Hogan, Skylee-Storm (20 February 2021). "Laughter Filled the Space: Challenging Euro-Centric Archival Spaces". The International Journal of Information, Diversity, & Inclusion. 5 (1): 97–110. doi:10.33137/ijidi.v5i1.34648.
- McCracken, Krista; Adolpho, Kalani; Krueger, Stephen G. (2023). Trans and Gender Diverse Voices in Libraries. Library Juice Press. ISBN 978-1-63400-120-5.
- McCracken, Krista; Hogan-Stacey, Skylee-Storm (2023). Decolonial Archival Futures. ALA Neal-Schuman. ISBN 9780838937150.
