= Joanne Robertson =

Canadian author, illustrator and water protection activist

- Misko Anungo Kwe (Red Star Woman)
- Education: Algoma University
- Occupation: Author
- Notable work: The Water Walker (2017)

Joanne Robertson, also known as Misko Anungo Kwe or Red Star Woman, is a Canadian author, illustrator, and water protection activist. Joanne is a member of Atikameksheng Anishnawbek and is of the Bald Eagle clan.

== Education and career ==
Robertson graduated with a Bachelor of Fine Arts degree from Algoma University and Shingwauk Kinoomaage Gamig.

During her time as a student, Robertson started an environmental project known as The Empty Glass for Water Campaign. The campaign began as a response to the drinking water crisis facing First Nations communities in the spring of 2009. The Campaign has a two-step action, one involving participants mailing an empty glass of water to the Canadian Prime Minister Stephen Harper with a letter outlining the need for action and the other focusing on the connection between prayer and water protection. She produced a short film about the Campaign called Glass Action.

In 2011, Robertson produced the Paquataskimik is Home film as part of the Paquataskimik Project created by the NORDIK Institute. The film documented traditional Indigenous life along the Albany River.

Robertson is currently a walk coordinator for the Mother Earth Water Walkers and has written a children's book about the organization's founder, Josephine Mandamin. She is also currently involved with the ArtSpeaks Project, a Sault Ste. Marie, Ontario initiative which utilizes an arts-based practice to work with trauma survivors.

== Literary works ==
=== The Water Walker ===
Robertson released a children's book in September 2017 titled The Water Walker published by Second Story Press. The book follows the journey of Josephine Mandamin to protect Nibi (water). The book includes an Ojibwe vocabulary and pronunciation page to help readers contextualize the Anishinaabe worldview. Robertson both wrote and illustrated the book. She began writing the book after coordinating the four directions walk in 2011 and meeting Josephine. The book was originally an entry into an indigenous writers competition that Robertson did not win, however the company was impressed and still offered her a publishing contract. Robertson has noted that the book's purpose is to continue spreading Josephine's message after she was diagnosed with Parkinson's disease and unable to continue with future water walks. In September 2019 a dual language edition of The Water Walker was published, with translation into Ojibwe done by Shirley Williams and Isadore Toulouse.

==== Awards for The Water Walker ====
- Finalist, Most Significant Work of Prose in English by an Emerging Indigenous Writer, Indigenous Voices Awards (2019).
- Indigenous Literature Award, Periodical Marketers of Canada and First Nation Communities Read (2018).
- Short listed, Most Significant Work of Prose in English by an Emerging Indigenous Writer, Indigenous Voices Awards (2018).
- Ontario Library Association, Best Bets in the Junior Non-Fiction category (2018).
- Listed on the Quill & Quire Books of the Year List, Bookseller's kidlit, selected by A Different Booklist (2017)

=== Nibi Is Water and Water Is Life ===
In 2020 Robertson published Nibi Is Water and Water Is Life with Second Story Press. This board book, aimed at young children is in both English and Anishinaabemowin The book talks about the ways children use and interact with water.

==== Recognition for Nibi Is Water ====
- Commended, TD Summer Reading Club - Top Recommended Reads (2021)
- Commended, The Educator’s Playbook list of Best Books for Young Readers (2020)
- Commended, American Indians in Children's Literature's Best Books of the Year (2020)
- Commended, CBC - Best Books for Kids and Teens (2020)

=== Shirley :An Indian Residential School Story ===
Published in 2026, Shirley: An Indian Residential School Story is a collaboration between Robertson and Shirley Fletcher Horn. Published by Second Story Press, this children's book documents Horn's experiences at the St. John's Indian Residential School and the Shingwauk Indian Residential School.
