= Michael Cachagee =

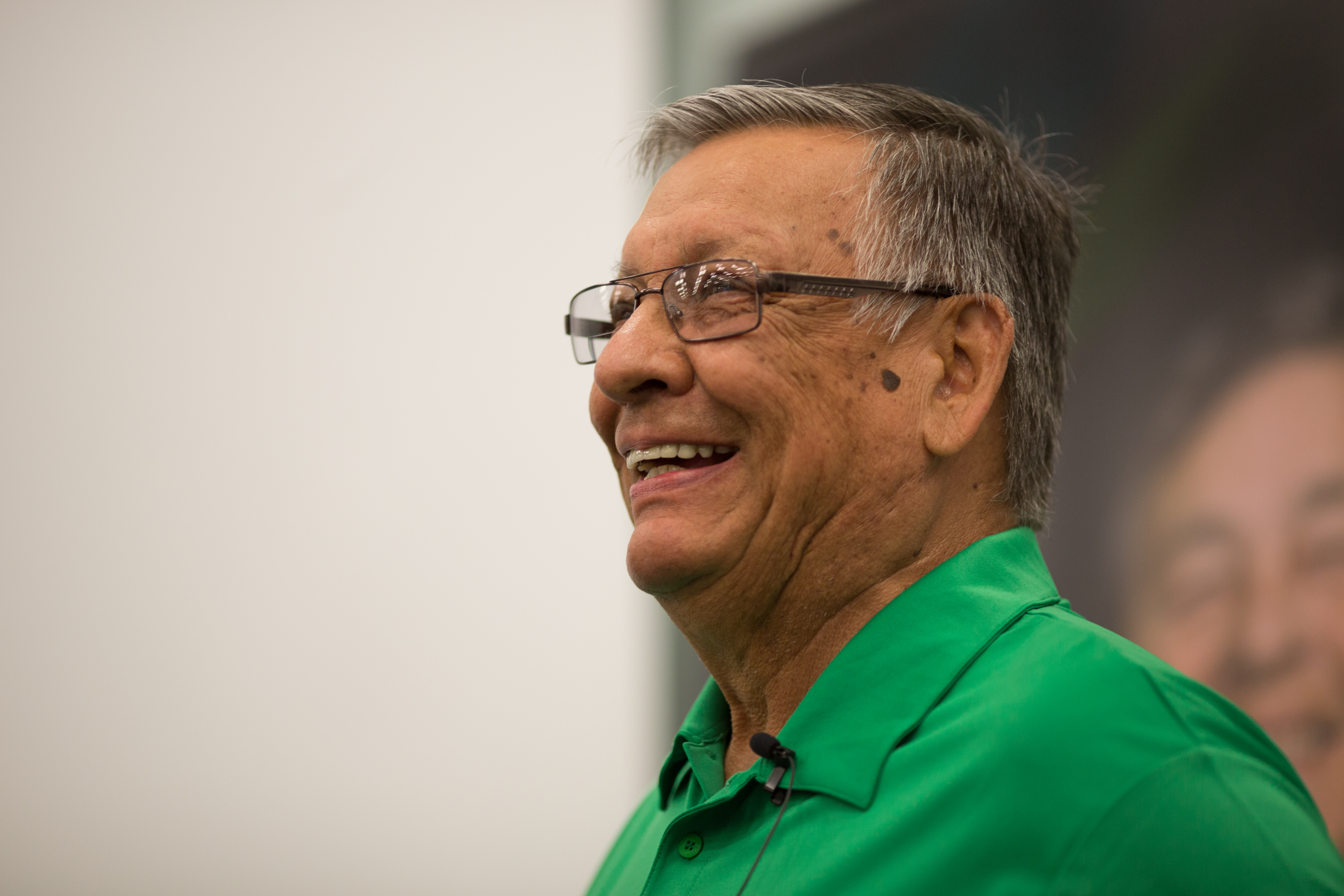
- Mike Cachagee at the Shingwauk Gathering and Conference, Algoma University, August 2015.
- Born: Michael Cachagee; 1940; Chapleau Cree First Nation, Ontario
- Died: July 15, 2023 (aged 82–83)
- Citizenship: Cree, Canadian
- Education: Algoma University College
- Organization(s): National Residential School Support Services, Ontario Indian Residential School Support Services
- Known for: Residential School advocacy, Indigenous politics

Michael (Mike) Cachagee (1940 – July 15, 2023) was a prominent Indigenous rights activist, speaker, and community leader. He was a member of Chapleau Cree First Nation and was one of the founding members of the Children of Shingwauk Alumni Association. He was a well known residential school survivor and has been an advocate for residential school rights, healing, and reconciliation. Mike died at the Sault Area Hospital on July 15, 2023.

== Education ==
Michael Cachagee attended three residential schools: St. John's Indian Residential School in Chapleau, Ontario, the Bishop Horden Indian Residential School in Moose Factory, and the Shingwauk Indian Residential School from 1952 to 1957. He entered the St. John's Indian Residential School at three and a half years of age and he was in the residential school system until the age of sixteen.

He went on to graduate from Algoma University in 1994 with a Bachelor of Arts degree in Political science. In 2011 Cachagee received the Distinguished Alumni Award from Algoma University. In June 2017 he was recognized as an honorary member of Algoma University. This recognition was presented at the 2017 Algoma University convocation by the senate of AlgomaU and is in recognition of his ongoing and long term service to the university.

He went on to work as a native student advisor at Algoma University College and later at Confederation College as the Dean of Native Studies.

== Advocacy ==
Michael Cachagee was a well known advocate and speaker on relating to residential schools. He was a founding member of the Children of Shingwauk Alumni Association, the National Residential School Survivor Society, and Ontario Indian Residential School Support Services. He was also the chair of the Board of Directors of Weecheetowin Support Services. All of these organizations have been dedicated to working with former residential school students and have played advocacy roles relating to residential schools.

Cachagee was on the floor of the House of Commons of Canada when Prime Minister Stephen Harper delivered his 2008 apology to residential school survivors. He was also involved throughout the Settlement Agreement process acting as health support throughout national events held by the Truth and Reconciliation Commission of Canada.

In 2012 through his work at the National Residential School Survivors Society Cachagee called for a review of the Indian Residential Schools Settlement Agreement and criticized the court process that was related to the agreement.

Cachagee was vocally opposed to the destruction of Independent Assessment Process court documents that were created as part of the Indian Residential School Settlement Agreement. He argued for the preservation of these documents which documented the experience of over 38,000 Survivors and supported their historical and education value for future generations learning about residential schools.

== Career ==
Cachagee has held numerous positions in First Nation government, council, and community organizations, including:

- Chief, Chapleau Cree First Nation, Fox Lake Reserve
- Lead Negotiator, Fox Lake Treaty Land Entitlement claim
- Governance and Education negotiation team, Nishnawbe Aski Nation
- Political advisor to Grand Chief, Nishnawbe Aski Nation
- President, Indian Friendship Centre, Sault Ste Marie (two terms)
- Board of Governors, Algoma University
- Executive Director, National Residential School Survivor Society (two terms)
- Chair, Ontario Indian Residential School Support Services
