= Children of Shingwauk Alumni Association =

Canadian grassroots organization

- Abbreviation: CSAA
- Formation: 1998
- Founder: Michael Cachagee, Shirley Fletcher Horn, Don Jackson
- Founded at: Sault Ste Marie, Ontario
- Region served: Canada
- CSAA Chair: George Diamond
- Vice Chair: Margaret Diamond
- Website: childrenofshingwauk.org

The Children of Shingwauk Alumni Association (CSAA) is a grassroots, community based intergenerational residential school survivor organization based in Sault Ste Marie, Ontario.

== Founding ==
Prior to 1998 the Children of Shingwauk Alumni Association (CSAA) operated as a grassroots community based organization and focused much of its efforts on organizing school reunions for former Shingwauk Indian Residential School students. These reunions invited former staff, students, and community members connected to the Shingwauk School to return to the School site, talk about their experiences, and connect with other members of the survivor community.

The CSAA held its first official meeting in 1998 and established an office at Algoma University College in the same year. The Shingwauk Project and the CSAA also established the Shingwauk Healing Project in 1998, dedicated to sharing, healing and learning in relation to the legacy of residential schools.

In 2020, the archives of the Children of Shingwauk Alumni Association, held by the Shingwauk Residential Schools Centre, were added by UNESCO to its Canada Memory of the World Register.

== Shingwauk reunions ==
The first Shingwauk reunion was held in 1981 at Algoma University College on the former site of the Shingwauk Indian Residential School. Ten years later, in 1991, the second Shingwauk reunion was held on the same site. Advertised as "Shingwauk Reunion 1991: 160th anniversary of Chief Shingwauk's Vision" the event resulted in hundreds of residential school survivors, community members, politicians, clergy, and residential school staff gathering at Algoma University College. The 1991 event also marked a shift in the discussion of life residential schools and many of the former students began to speak out about their experiences, including the abuse at the Shingwauk School.

The third gathering of the former students and staff of the Shingwauk School was held July 4–7, 1996. At this reunion the Children of Shingwauk Alumni Association issued a "Declaration of the Shingwauk Reunion 1996" in which the former students pledged themselves to the fulfilling the vision of Chief Shingwauk and the ongoing work related to healing and education. This declaration and subsequent activities resulted in the formal establishment of the Children of Shingwauk Alumni Association.

== Relationship with Algoma University ==
The organization has a longstanding relationship with the administration of Algoma University and other partner organizations located on the historic Shingwauk site. The CSAA has two seats on the board of the Shingwauk Education Trust, are represented on a number of internal Algoma University committees such as the Anishinaabe Peoples' Council, and holds a seat on the Algoma University board of governors. In 2006 the relationship between Algoma University and the Children of Shingwauk Alumni Association was formalized through the signing of an articles of agreement which governs the relationship of their partnership. This document also outlines governance of the CSAA archival collection held in the Shingwauk Residential Schools Centre in partnership with Algoma University. Since 2006 the CSAA has continued to be involved in University decisions relating to Indigenous communities, reconciliation, and residential schools.

The 2017 Algoma University statement on the Truth and Reconciliation Commission of Canada drew heavily on the experience of the CSAA and committed the University to marking the history of the survivors of the Shingwauk Residential School.

== Programming ==
In 2003 CSAA became a founding partner of the National Residential School Survivor Society, a national organization which provided a survivor advocacy voice during the Indian Residential School Settlement Agreement process. In the following year the CSAA was selected by Indian Residential Schools Resolutions Canada to act as the Ontario site for the Alternative dispute resolution pilot project.

From 2008 to 2014 the CSAA held the Ontario portion of the Health Canada health and cultural support worker contract in relating to the Indian Residential School Settlement Agreement. This included providing health and cultural support services at community and commemoration events, at national Truth and Reconciliation Commission of Canada events, and as part of the Independent Assessment Process under the settlement agreement. In 2014 the Children of Shingwauk Alumni Association cut ties with this program and this work was taken over by Ontario Indian Residential Schools Support Services.

In 2012 the CSAA in partnership with Shingwauk Kinoomaage Gamig launched the Charlie Hunter Scholarship fund for residential school descendants who are studying at Algoma University. The scholarship is in memory of Charlie Hunter, a student who died while at St. Anne's Indian Residential School. Charlie was buried at the residential school against the wishes of his family and the Hunter family worked for over thirty years to bring Charlie's body back to his home community. In 2011 Charlie's body was finally returned to his home community of Peawanuck, Ontario. Past winners of the scholarship have included: Frank Belleau (2015), Mitch Case (2015).

In 2016 the Children of Shingwauk Alumni Association through the work of the Shingwauk Residential Schools Centre partnered with the Archives of Ontario to contribute to the "Family Ties: Ontario Turns 150" exhibit which featured content relating to the Shingwauk family and Shingwauk Residential School.

== Logo and commissioned artwork ==
The CSAA logo utilizes the public domain image of Chief Shingwauk from the 1850 Robinson-Huron Treaty signing. Chief Shingwauk was a signatory to the 1850 Robinson Huron Treaty and the Shingwauk Indian Residential School was named after him.

Since 1981 CSAA has commissioned a number of local Indigenous artists to create artwork to be used in promotion and educational programming. This artwork is currently part of the Shingwauk Residential Schools Centre archival holdings and is on display in Algoma University. Artwork commissioned by the CSAA includes:

- Shingwaukonse: Rising Crane (1981), Brian Wagoosh
- Shingwauk's Vision: The Teaching Wigwam (1991), Jesse Agawa
- Gathering (2002), Leland Bell
- Celebrating Resilience Through Education (2012), Shelly Fletcher

== See also ==
- Shingwauk Indian Residential School
- Canadian Indian Residential School System
