= Shingwauk Residential Schools Centre =

Education centre and archive at Algoma University, Ontario, Canada

- Location: East Wing, Algoma University, Sault Ste Marie, Ontario, Canada
- Type: Academic
- Established: 1979

Other information
- Director: Paul Sayers
- Website: http://srsc.algomau.ca/

The Shingwauk Residential Schools Centre (SRSC) is an archival repository and cross-cultural education centre within Algoma University with a special mandate to collect and preserve material relating to the legacy of residential schools in Canada, healing and reconciliation, and Indigenous communities. The Shingwauk Residential Schools Centre is jointly governed by Algoma University and the Children of Shingwauk Alumni Association. It is a partner with the Engracia de Jesus Matias Archives and Special Collections which is also located at Algoma University.

== History ==
The Shingwauk Residential Schools Centre developed out of the Shingwauk Project initiative.

=== Shingwauk Project ===
Shingwauk Project logo

The Shingwauk Project was started in 1979 by Algoma University professor Don Jackson and numerous local partners including: Lloyd Bannerman of Algoma University College, Ron Boissoneau of Garden River First Nation, Dan Pine Sr. a residential school survivor and member of Garden River First Nation, and many other former students of the Shingwauk and Wawanosh Indian Residential Schools. The Shingwauk Project was established as a cross-cultural educational and cross-cultural research project which aims to acknowledge the legacy of residential schools and bring to the forefront the history of the Shingwauk Indian Residential School.

Since 1979 the Shingwauk Project has under taken numerous projects in the spirit of 'healing, sharing, and learning.' These projects have included hosting residential school reunions, the creation of historical pamphlets, educational displays, offering guided tours of the Shingwauk site, and the establishment of an archive, library and heritage collections that would become the foundation for the Shingwauk Residential Schools Centre.

=== Establishment of an Archive ===
The collection of archival material under the auspices of the Shingwauk Project began in 1981 at the first Shingwauk reunion. This event invited former students and staff of the Shingwauk Indian Residential School to return to the Shingwauk site and discuss their experiences. Many of the attendees brought with them documents and photographs that they wished to share with others. The result was the establishment of an informal archive. This grassroots archival effort evolved into the formal archival holdings of the Shingwauk Residential Schools Centre.

From 2010-2012 the Shingwauk Residential Schools Centre archival holdings underwent significant changes and began the process of professionalization. This process included the hiring of dedicated archival staff, creating digital records, and applying the Canadian Rules for Archival Description to the archival holdings.

=== Directors ===
- Don Jackson, 1979-2010
- Co-Directors Ken Hernden and Don Jackson, 2010-2012
- Jonathan Dewar, 2012-2016
- Co-Directors Ken Hernden and Don Jackson, 2016-2018
- Elizabeth Edgar-Wekamigad, 2018–2021
- Krista McCracken, 2021 (Interim Director).
- Nicole Nicholas-Bayer, 2022-2023 (Director of Mukwa Waakaa'igan).
- Joel Syrette, 2023-2025 (Director of Makwa Waakaa'igan).
- Paul Sayers, 2025-Present (Interim Director of Makwa Waakaa'igan)

=== Collections ===
The Shingwauk Residential Schools Centre contains archival material relating to the history of residential schools across Canada, Indigenous organizations, Indigenous artists, and organizations engaged in healing and reconciliation work. The archives include residential school administrative records, photographs, school newsletters, church publications, staff correspondence, artifacts and artwork created by students during and following their time in residential schools, and other material.

In September 2020 the Children of Shingwauk Alumni Association and Shingwauk Reunion fonds held at the Shingwauk Residential Schools Centre were added to the UNESCO Memory of the World Register.

=== Cross-Cultural Programming ===
Cross-cultural programming provided by the Shingwauk Residential Schools Centre includes outreach and education activities for elementary, high school, and professional development groups. In 2018 the Centre launched a partnership called Shifting Indigenous Frontline Tactics (SHIFT) with the Sault Ste. Marie Police Service to facilitate ongoing cultural training for police staff. In 2019, the SHIFT program was nominated for the Sault Innovation Award, Innovative Project of the Year.

== Logo ==
The Shingwauk Residential Schools Centre logo evolved out of the Shingwauk Project logo. The image of the crane was selected for the original logo because of Chief Shingwauk's connection the crane. He was a member of the crane clan and his dodem was a crane. The Shingwauk Project logo was modeled after the 'Rising Crane' painting commissioned by the Project. In 2011 Shingwauk Residential Schools Centre staff member Michelle McMillan designed a modern take on the classic crane logo. The logo created by McMillan is still currently in use by the Centre.

== Awards ==
In 2013 the work of the Centre was recognized by the Archives Association of Ontario when the Shingwauk Residential Schools Centre and Algoma University's Arthur A. Wishart Library received the Archives Association of Ontario Institutional Award. In 2013 the archives was also the recipient of the Project of the Year award from the Sault Ste. Marie Innovation Centre's SMMARt Innovation Awards.

In 2016 the Centre partnered with the Archives of Ontario to contribute to the "Family Ties: Ontario Turns 150" exhibit which featured content relating to the Shingwauk family and Shingwauk Residential School. The Family Ties exhibition went on to win the 2017 Award of Excellence in Exhibitions offered by the Ontario Museum Association.

In August 2018 the Shingwauk Residential Schools Centre, including researcher and curator Krista McCracken, worked in partnership with Algoma University and the Children of Shingwauk Alumni Association, opened the Reclaiming Shingwauk Hall exhibition space. This space is an exhibit which tell this history of the Shingwauk Residential School site, within the context of colonialism in Canada, while also celebrating the resilience of residential school survivors. The Reclaiming Shingwauk Hall space won the 2018 Ontario Historical Society Indigenous History award.

In 2019 the Reclaiming Shingwauk Hall space was shortlisted for the Governor General's History Award for Excellence in Community Programming. In the same year, the Reclaiming Shingwauk Hall project won the Sault Innovation Award, Innovative Project of the Year award. The Shingwauk Residential Schools Centre was also awarded the Municipal Heritage Award by the City of Sault Ste. Marie.

In March 2020, the Shingwauk Residential Schools Centre was presented with the Leading Cultural Destination, Soft Power Best Cultural Organisation award.

In 2023 the Reclaiming Shingwauk Hall exhibition was recognized with the Ontario Museum Association Award of Excellence in Exhibitions.
