= Project of Heart =

Collaborative art based project

Project of Heart is a collaborative art based education project designed to teach about the history of Indigenous people in Canada. The initiative aims to foster reconciliation, commemorate those students who died as a result of residential schools, and encourage social justice among Canadians. They encourage art from kids in schools around Canada.

== History ==
Project of Heart is a national education program that has been offered at schools across Canada since 2009. It was founded by Sylvia Smith with a desire to commemorate those who were and still are impacted by residential schools. In 2011 Charlene Bearhead joined the Project as part of her role at the Native Counselling Services of Alberta. Bearhead's assisted the Project of Heart in expanding across Canada and in building a sustainable network of Project of Heart hubs.

In December 2011 Canada's History Society awarded Sylvia Smith the Governor General's Award for Excellence in teaching for her work associated with the Project of Heart. Thousands of schools across Canada have used Project of Heart to teach about residential schools and Indigenous people in Canada.

Project of Heart has six core steps 1) Learning about the Canadian residential school system 2) Learning more in-depth about a specific residential school. Here a class or group chooses a residential school to learn about, focusing on the original peoples on whose land the school stood and their contributions 3) A gesture of reconciliation, which often includes creating an art piece to reflect on the history of residential schools 4) Providing an opportunity for students to speak with a residential school survivor 5) Creating a social justice response. 6) Creating cards or gifts for residential school survivors.

== Social Justice ==
As part of their engagement with the Project of Heart a group located in Regina, Saskatchewan researched the history of the Regina Indian Residential School. Their research helped built a local narrative around the site and included information about the residential school graveyard that was associated with the school. The group was also responsible for the founding of the Regina Indian Industrial School Commemorative Association and petitioning the local government to become involved in preserving the history of the Regina site. On September 26, 2016 the Regina city council designed the site as a local heritage site. In 2017 the residential school cemetery associated with the school was designed as a provincial heritage site.

In 2016 Marie Wilson, former commissioner of the Truth and Reconciliation Commission, used the social justice portion of the Project of Heart to send a petition to the Government of Quebec regarding the need to implement curriculum changes so all students in Quebec learn about residential schools.

== Education and Art Projects ==
The British Columbia partners of Project of heart published the book and interactive ebook "Project of Heart: Illuminating the hiding history of Indian Residential Schools in BC" with the goal of providing teachers with educational resources they can use to teach about residential schools. Additionally, in August 2013 a canoe constructed with commemorative tiles created by BC student participants in Project of Heart was unveiled.

In 2013 Algoma University unveiled "Children to Children" a Project of Heart commemorative art project created by artists Shirley Fletcher Horn, Shelley Fletcher and Zenith Lillie-Eakett. "Children to Children" speaks to the historical legacy of residential schools and the ongoing work of reconciliation, it also includes a number of Project of Heart commemorative tiles that were created by students from throughout Ontario. This art installation is on permanent display at AlgomaU.

In September 2013, the Project of Heart hosted a multi-day artwork exhibition and event at the Pacific National Exhibition. Artists that contributed to this exhibition included children from schools in Vancouver as well as professional artists. Paintings, carvings and canoes were among the pieces of art that were on display.
