= Algoma Ink =

Juried Canadian journal

Algoma Ink is a juried Canadian journal devoted to the publication of poetry, prose, and art from both established and emerging artists which reflects a diversity of social and cultural experience with a focus on literary and artistic excellence. An annually published literary magazine co-sponsored by Algoma University's Department of English and Film, it is archived at the National Library of Canada in Ottawa, Ontario and at the Engracia de Jesus Matias Archives and Special Collections at Algoma University in Sault Ste. Marie, Ontario.

Algoma Ink was launched in 1996. It is a Northern Ontario publication, and aims to reflect the themes of consciousness in that region, without being limited to this focus. It is hand-bound and individually numbered by its production team. Algoma Ink has been supervised over the years by Executive Editors Karl E. Jirgens and Alanna F. Bondar.

== See also ==
- Canadian literature
