= Edward Francis Wilson =

Rev Edward Francis Wilson
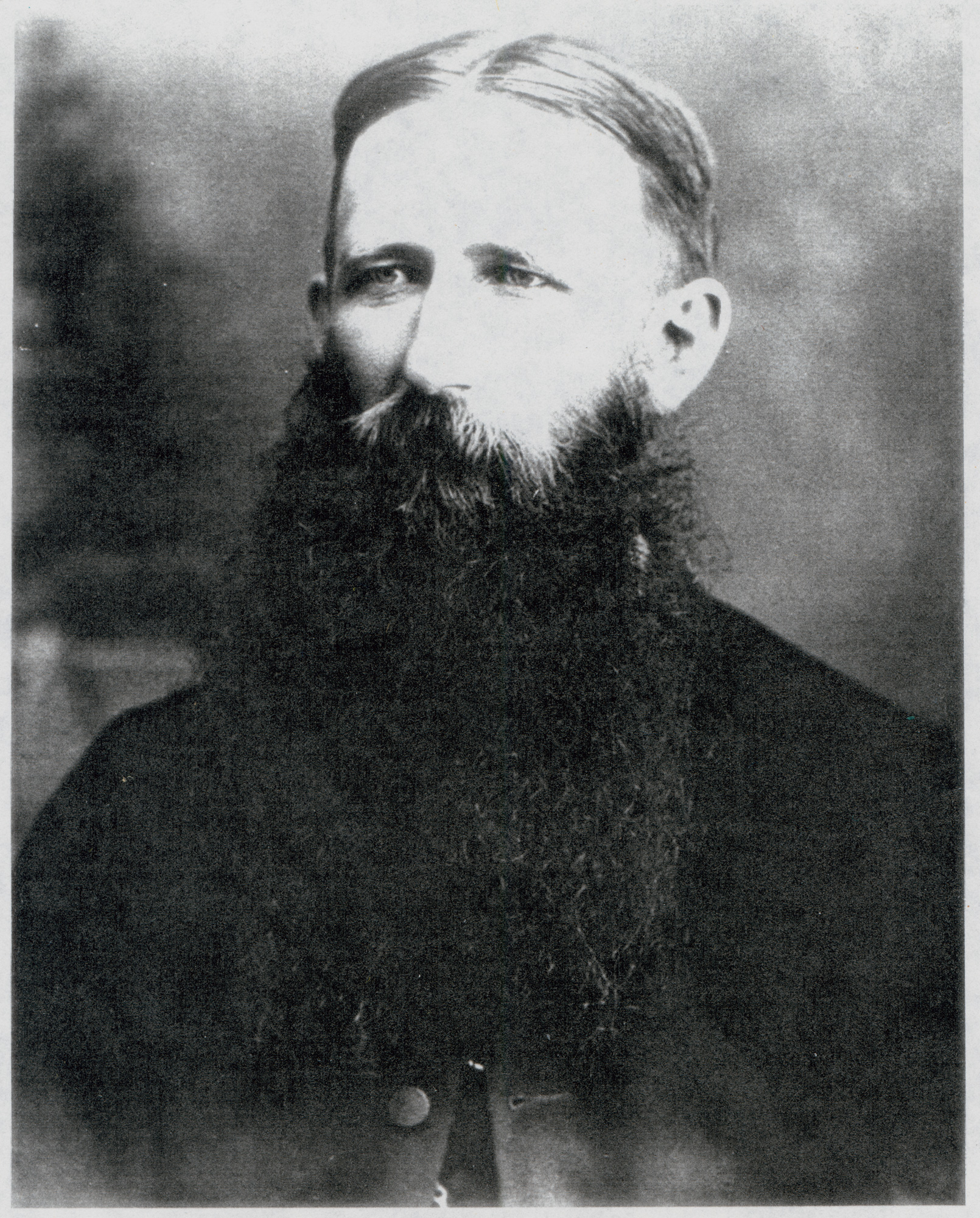
- Rev. E.F. Wilson, circa 1880
- Born: December 7, 1844; Islington, England
- Died: May 11, 1915 (aged 70); Salt Spring Island, British Columbia, Canada
- Education: Huron College
- Occupation: missionary
- Spouse: Frances Spooner
- Parent(s): Daniel Wilson and Lucy Sarah Atkins

Ecclesiastical career
- Church: Church of England, Anglican Church of Canada
- Ordained: 1867 December 22

The Rev Edward Francis Wilson (7 December 1844 – 11 May 1915) was a prominent Canadian Anglican missionary and clergyman in the second half of the 19th century.

== Life ==
Edward Francis Wilson (also known as E.F. Wilson) was born in Islington, England on December 7, 1844, to Daniel Frederick Wilson and Lucy Sarah Atkins. His grandfather was Daniel Wilson the Church of England Bishop of Calcutta. Wilson was born into the British upper-middle class and was well acquainted with the Evangelical community in England. Three of his sisters married clergymen and one of his brothers also served as a member of the clergy.

Wilson emigrated to Canada in 1865 with ambitions of becoming a farmer. However, upon his arrival he studied at Huron College in London, Ontario with the ambition of becoming a missionary in Canada. He was ordained as a deacon on December 22, 1867, by the Bishop of London at the Chapel Royal in England. He returned to Huron as part of the Church Missionary Society. Wilson met his wife Frances (Fanny) Spooner in 1863 and they were married on June 3, 1868. They went on to have eleven children.

Wilson's early missionary work under the Church Missionary Society was focused on conversion of Indigenous peoples in Southwestern Ontario to the Anglican faith. This work was with Indigenous communities in Sarnia, Kettle Point, and Saint Claire First Nation. He also worked with the communities at Sauble, Cape Croker, and New Credit. While working in this region Wilson established a network of Anglican catechists to help him with his work. He also established a sewing circle focused on using English fabrics and patterns.

In 1871 Wilson moved to the Sault Ste. Marie and Garden River First Nation region. He was the founding principal of the Shingwauk Indian Residential School from 1873 until 1892 when he retired from missionary work and moved to British Columbia. He was also responsible for the construction of schools in Batchawana Bay, Nipigon, Elkhorn, Manitoba (Washakada Home for Girls and Kasota Home for Boys), and Medicine Hat.

In 1894 he moved to Salt Spring Island and worked as a pastor to the white local community. He died in Victoria, British Columbia in 1915.

A cairn commemorating Wilson and his work with the Shingwauk Home currently sits on the front lawn of Algoma University.

== Publications ==
In addition to his missionary work Wilson was a prolific writer and was also responsible for the publication of a number of missionary journals. His work typically appeared under his own name. However, in the 1890s articles appeared in the Canadian Indian under the pen name Fair Play which are believed to have also been written by Wilson.

- Wilson, Edward F. (1874). The Ojebway language: a manual for missionaries and others employed among the Ojebway Indians. Toronto: Printed by Rowsell and Hutchison for the Venerable Society for Promoting Christian Knowledge, London. ISBN 9780665259845.
- Wilson, Edward F. (1877). Shingwauk Hymn Book. Sault Ste. Marie, Ontario: Shingwauk Home.
- Wilson, Edward F. (1886). Missionary Work Among the Ojebway Indians. London: Society For Promoting Christian Knowledge.
- Wilson, Edward F. (1888). Report on the Sarcee Indians. London. ISBN 9780665173820.
- Wilson, Edward F. (1890). Our Indians in a New Light: A Lecture on the Indians. Halifax, Nova Scotia: Printed by Holloway Bros. ISBN 9780665355776.
- Our Forest Children, contributor and publisher (1887–1890)
- Canadian Indian, editor and contributor (1890–1891)
- Algoma Missionary News and Shingwauk Journal, editor and contributor (1876–1889)
- Wilson, Edward F. (1895). Salt Spring Island, British Columbia. Victoria: Colonist Press.
- Wilson, Edward F. (1908). Autobiographical Journal: From Barnsbury, England to Barnsbury, Canada, 1868-1908 (PDF). Salt Spring Island, British Columbia.
- The Object of the Bible (1914)
