= Mica Bay Incident =

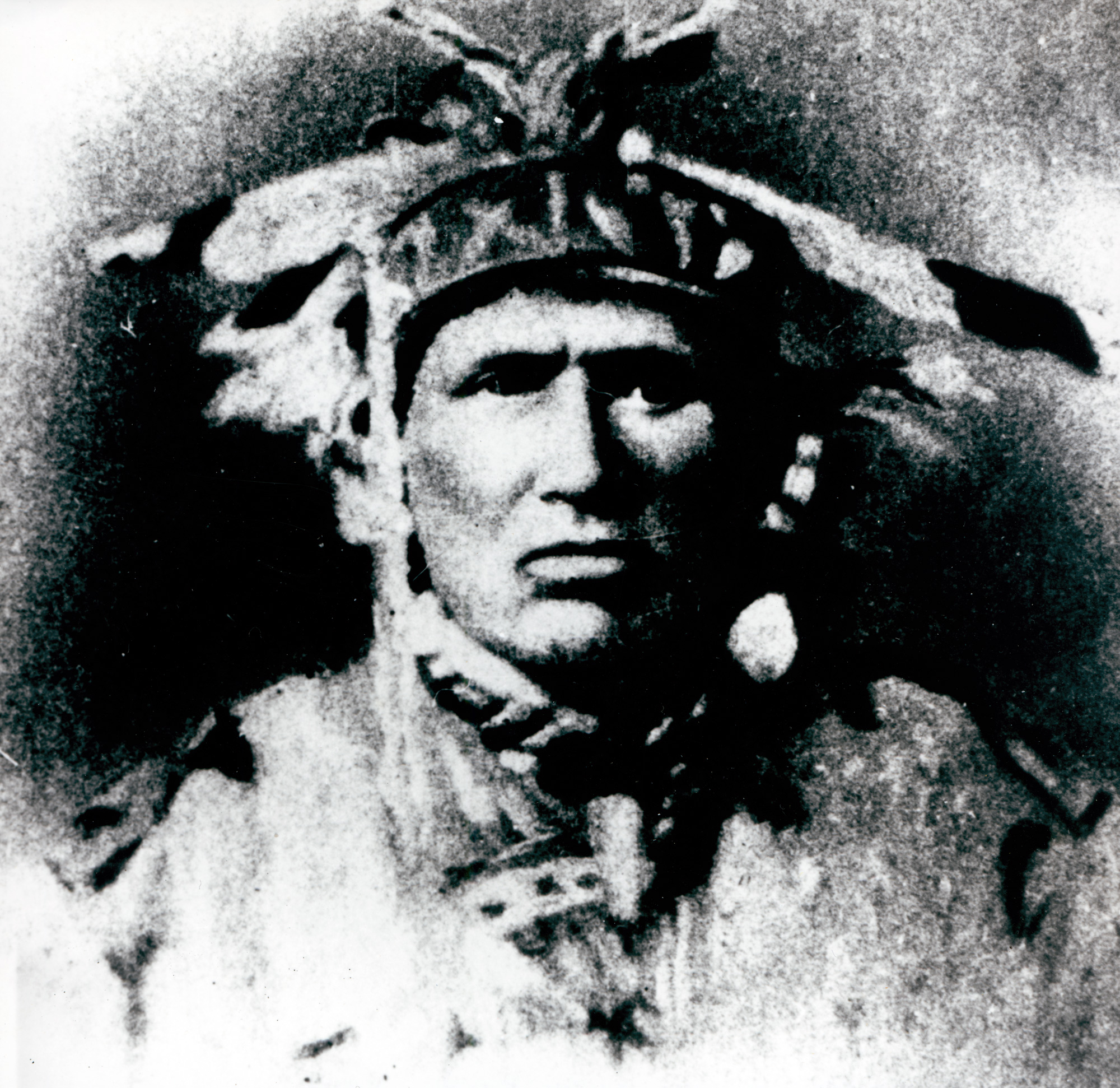
Chief Shingwaukonse of Garden River

The Mica Bay Incident (also known as the Michipicoten War or the Mica Bay Uprising) was a land and resources dispute in along the shore of Lake Superior in November 1849. A group of Indigenous activists attacked copper mining sites established by the Quebec Mining Company, in attempt to force the Company off the land. Soldiers were sent to put down the protesters, and in December a number of the group's leaders were arrested and detained in Toronto. The protest was partly responsible for the signing of the 1850 Robinson-Huron Treaty.

== Background ==
The political tensions leading up to the incident reflected Indigenous concerns about their lack of land rights, the impacts of mineral extraction, and corporate/Crown encroachment on their traditional territories.

== Incident ==
In 1849 a group of Anishinaabek (now recognized as First Nations in Canada) in the Sault Ste. Marie, Ontario area people were displeased with ongoing mineral extraction by local mining companies. This mining was occurring outside of a negotiated treaty and contrary to the 1763 Royal Proclamation's statements on Indigenous land and resource rights. In November 1849 a group traveled from Sault Ste. Marie to Mica Bay on the shore of Lake Superior. Upon arrival at Mica Bay the group attacked copper mining sites established by the Quebec Mining Company, with the goal of forcing the Company off the land. Over 100 soldiers were sent to put down the incident and in December a number of the leaders were arrested and detained in Toronto.

Leaders of the incident included Chief Shingawukonse (Garden River), Chief Nebenaigoching (Batchewana), Chief Oshawana (Walpole Island), Allan Macdonell, Metcalfe, and others.

== Aftermath ==
The Mica Bay incident is known as the tipping point which forced the government to negotiate treaty agreements with Indigenous communities in the Lake Huron and Lake Superior region. The Mica Bay Incident occurred shortly before the signing of the Robinson Treaties.

== See also ==
- 1849 in Canada
