= Shingwauk Kinoomaage Gamig =

Indigenous institute in Ontario, Canada

- Motto: An Anishinabe Worldview: Our Story... the truth.
- Type: Indigenous Institute
- Established: September 2008
- Affiliations: Algoma University
- Location: Sault Ste. Marie & Garden River, Ontario, Canada
- Website: www.shingwauku.org

Shingwauk Kinoomaage Gamig is a Canadian Indigenous-led institute, with Algoma University in Sault Ste. Marie as one of its main partners. Shingwauk Kinoomaage Gamig is one of nine Indigenous institutes in Ontario's post-secondary system and collaborates with other colleges and universities to offer post-secondary programs geared specifically toward Indigenous students.

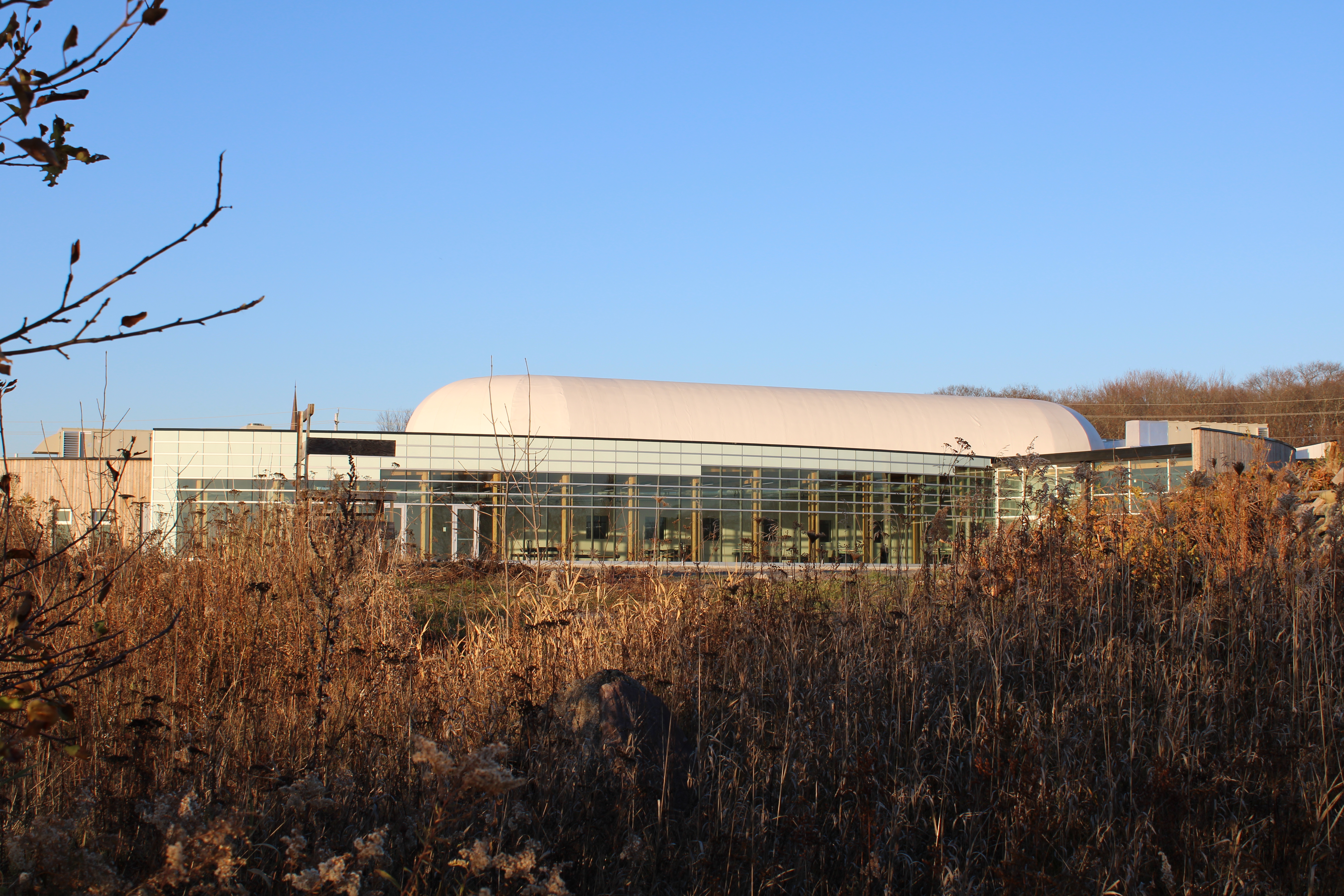
Southside image of Shingwauk Kinoomaage Gamig (Autumn 2020)

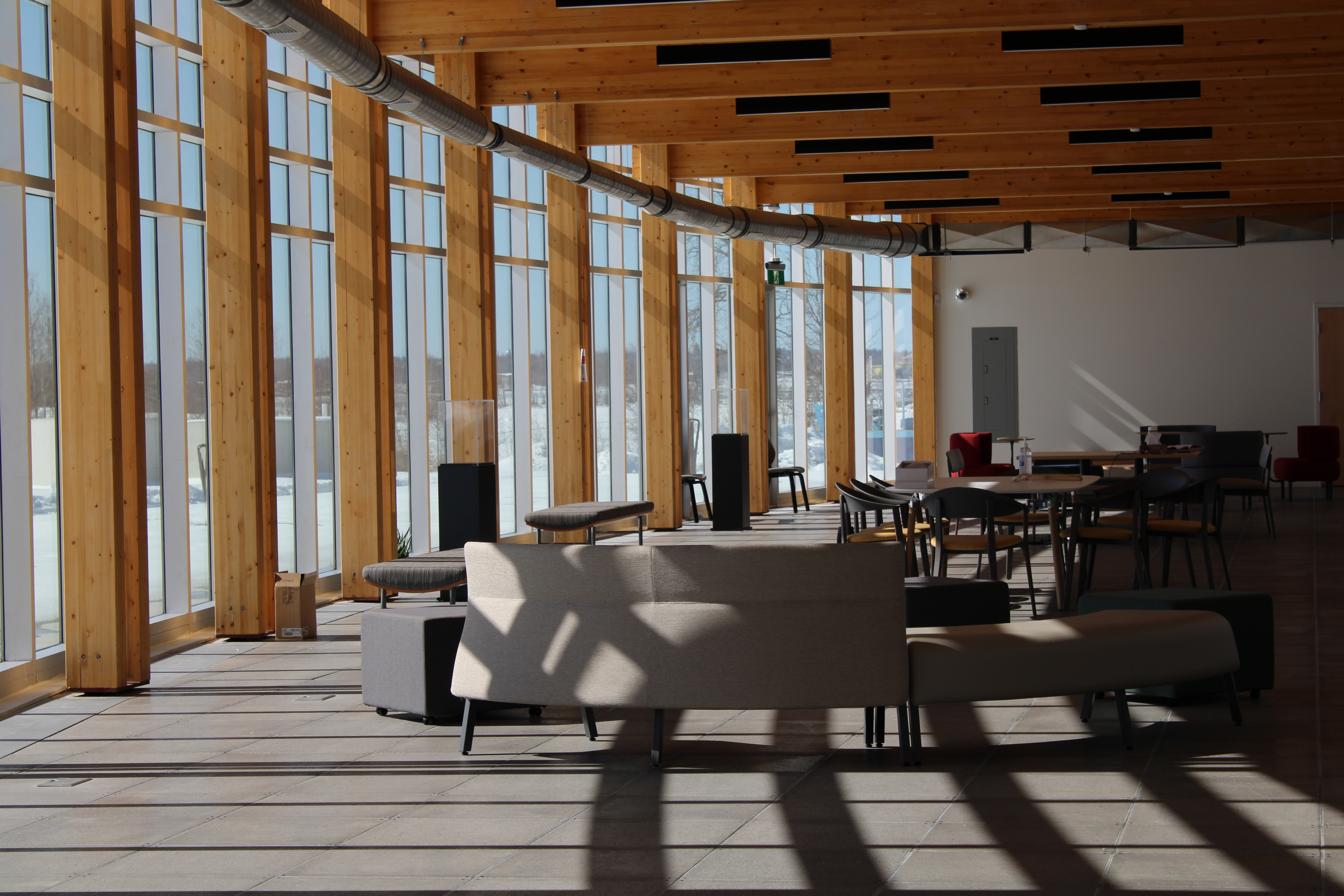
Image of the gallery at Shingwauk Kinoomaage Gamig and the southside facing windows

== Founding ==
In 2006 the Shingwauk Education Trust established Shingwauk Kinoomaage Gamig to act as its educational arm, dedicated to providing Anishinaabe centered post-secondary education. In 2006, Shingwauk Kinoomaage Gamig and Algoma University signed a covenant that promised to assist each other in their journey towards independence. This was a major contributing factor to Algoma University's independence as the partnership was held in high regard.

The name Shingwauk Kinoomaage Gamig, when fully vocalized in Anishinaabemowin, is Zhingwaak Gikinoo'amaagegamig, meaning "Shingwauk's Place of learning & knowledge". The creation of a space for Anishinaabe learning, often referred to as a teaching wigwam, was first envisioned by Chief Shingwauk. In the winter of 1833–34, this vision, along with other concerns for the well-being of his people, prompted Chief Shingwauk to travel by snowshoe to York, Ontario (now Toronto): a voyage of nearly 700 km (430 mi).

When Chief Shingwauk died in 1854, the fulfillment of his vision fell on his sons, Augustin Shingwauk and Bugujjewenene, and the Anglican Church. In 1873, the "Teaching Wigwam Lodge" became a reality with a school (Shingwauk Industrial Home) being constructed in the Garden River community. However, because of the Anglican Church and the assimilation policies of the Government of Canada, the operations and purpose of this iteration of the "Teaching Wigwam Lodge" were not true to Chief Shingwauk's vision. Rather, the School became part of the Canadian residential school system instead of its initial purposes originally advocated by Shingwaukonse.

Today, the work of Shingwauk Kinoomaage Gamig sits on the lands once used by the Shingwauk Indian Residential School and actively works to returns to the original vision of Chief Shingwauk and emphasizes culture-based, Anishinaabe center learning.

== Programming ==
In September 2008 Shingwauk Kinoomaage Gamig began offering courses in Anishinaabe studies. In September 2012 the institution became accredited by the World Indigenous Nations Higher Education Consortium (WINHEC). On November 8, 2018, Shingwauk Kinoomaage Gamig and Algoma University reaffirmed their relationships by signing an addendum to the 2006 covenant.

Shingwauk Kinoomaage Gamig is recognized as one of the nine Indigenous Institutes in Ontario and currently partners with Algoma University to provide undergraduate degree programs in Anishinaabemowin and Anishinaabe studies. Formalized in 2018, the Anishinaabe Studies program is the first of its kind in Canada.

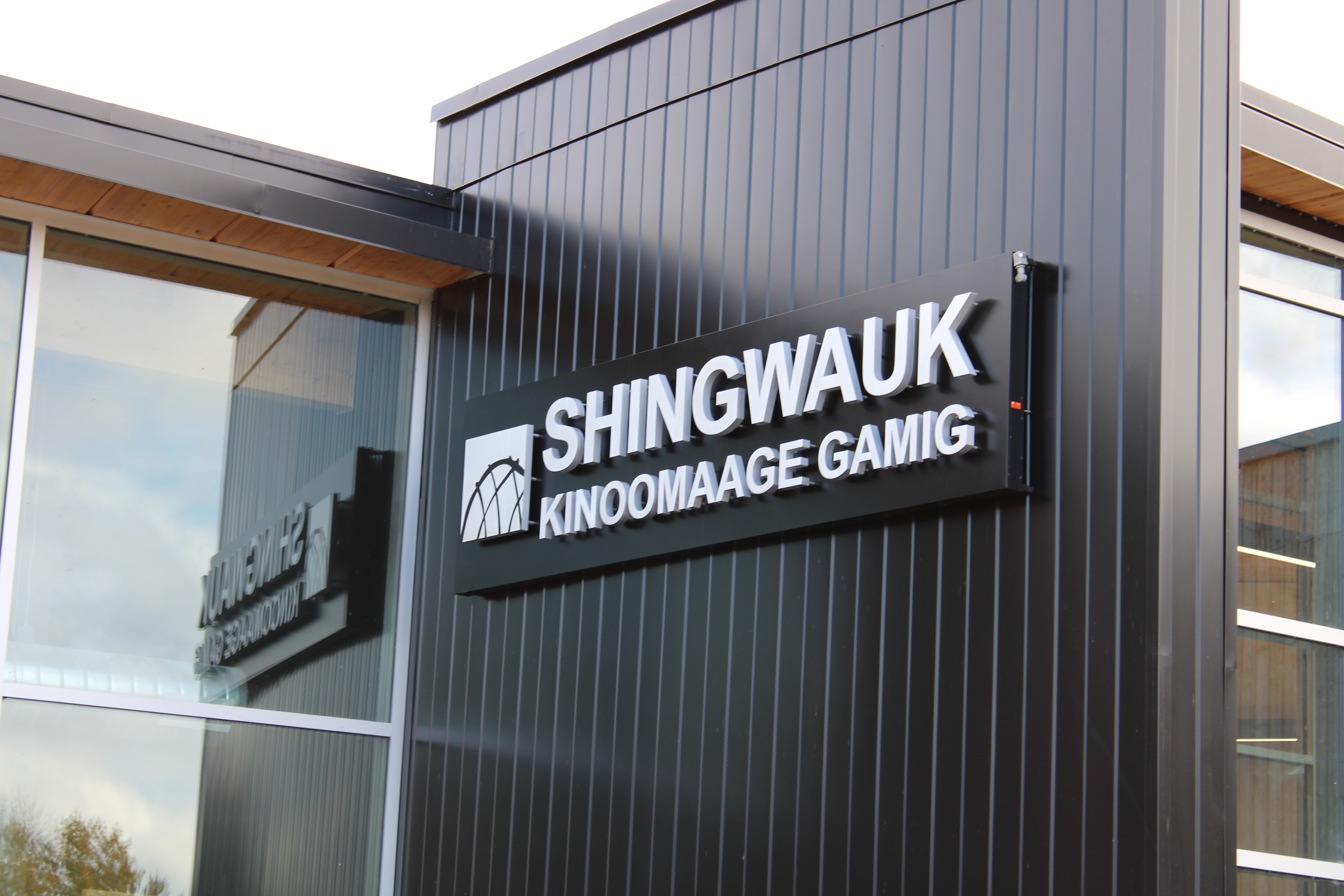
Front entrance to Shingwauk Kinoomaage Gamig

In 2016 Shingwauk Kinoomaage Gamig was granted federal infrastructure funding for the establishment of an Anishinabek Discovery Centre. The construction of this facility will drastically change the programming and capacity of Shingwauk Kinoomaage Gamig to provide culture based learning opportunities. In 2018 the Assembly of First Nations unanimously passed a resolution for the National Chiefs Library to be housed at the Anishinabek Discovery Centre.

== Faculty and alumni ==
Notable alumni and past faculty members include:

- Joanne Robertson
- Josephine Mandamin
- Eddie Benton-Banai
- Patricia M. Ningewance
- Jerry Fontaine
- Howard Webkamigad

== Partners ==
The new university was initiated by the Shingwauk Education trust and supported by a number of partnerships including :

- Algoma University
- Anglican Church of Canada
- Anishinabek Nation
- Assembly of First Nations
- Batchewana First Nation
- Chiefs of Ontario
- Garden River First Nation
- Indian Residential Schools Truth and Reconciliation Commission
- K-Net
- Laurentian University (Native Studies)
- Leech Lake Tribal Council
- Library and Archives Canada
- Mi'kmaq Association of Tribal Studies
- National Centre for First Nations Governance
- North Shore Tribal Council
- Northern Michigan University (American Indian Studies)
- Sagkeeng First Nation
- Seven Generations of Fort Frances
- Shingwauk Healing Project
- Te Wānanga o Aotearoa "University of New Zealand"
- Three Fires Midewiwin Lodge
- Union of Ontario Indians
- University of Arizona, Tucson (Native Studies)
- University of Sudbury (Native Studies)
