= St. John's Indian Residential School =

Residential school in Ontario

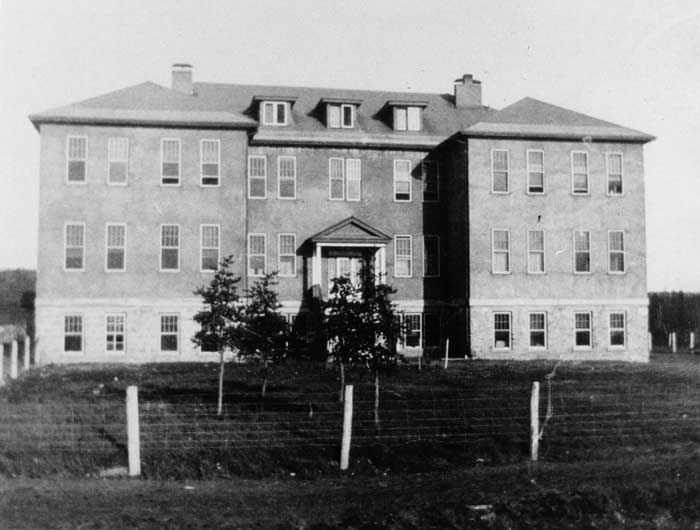
- St. John's Indian Residential School building, circa 1920-1930
- Chapleau, Ontario

Information
- Other name: Chapleau Indian Residential School
- School type: residential school
- Religious affiliation: Anglican Church of Canada
- Established: 1907
- Closed: 1948

The St. John's Indian Residential School, also known as the Chapleau Indian Residential School, was a Canadian Indian Residential School operated by the Anglican Church of Canada from 1907 to 1948 in Chapleau, Ontario.

== History ==
The original residential school in Chapleau was operated by the Anglican Diocese of Moosonee from 1907 to 1920. In 1920, the school's administration was taken over by the Department of Indian Affairs. The school was built to accommodate 40 students, and in 1919 it was expanded to accommodate 45. The residential school was located on 153 acres on the east side of Chapleau near the Nebskwashi River. This original school building burned down on June 27, 1926. The original residential school site in Chapleau was never developed and is now part of the forest.

By 1912 it was decided that the current building was too small to accommodate the school. In 1914 a new location of 1,184 acres was bought from the Ontario government for one dollar an acre. However, the new location was far from the town of Chapleau and did not have convenient road access. In 1920 a new 2,142-acre site, closer to town, was purchased. The new two-storey school building designed to accommodate 100 students was built at a cost of $89,000. School was ultimately built on the 1,184 site plus two small parcels purchased from Chapleau businessman James McNiece Austin. The site was not far from Chapleau and was adjacent to a lumber mill and hydroelectric plant.

The school operated at capacity until it closed on July 1, 1948. Many of its students were transferred to the Shingwauk Indian Residential School or the Moose Factory Indian Residential School. The school property was purchased by Nick Gionet for $7,000 in 1948 and eventually all of the school buildings were demolished, this site is now a small residential subdivision.

== Cemetery ==
For many years the cemetery associated with the St. John's School was unmarked. Chapleau Cree First Nation has since worked to put a fence around the cemetery and install a commemorative plaque that lists twenty eight names of those who are known to have died at the School. This cemetery is on the grounds of what was the second school and only students who attended that school are buried there. The location of the graves of the children who died at the first school are a mystery but are likely on the grounds of the first school.

As part of the Truth and Reconciliation Commission of Canada's missing children residential school cemetery project, archeologists identified 42 grave sites in the cemetery associated with the newer St. John's Residential School building that operated from 1920 to 1948. The names of the students who are known to have died at the School are listed in the National Memorial Death Register.

== Student experience ==
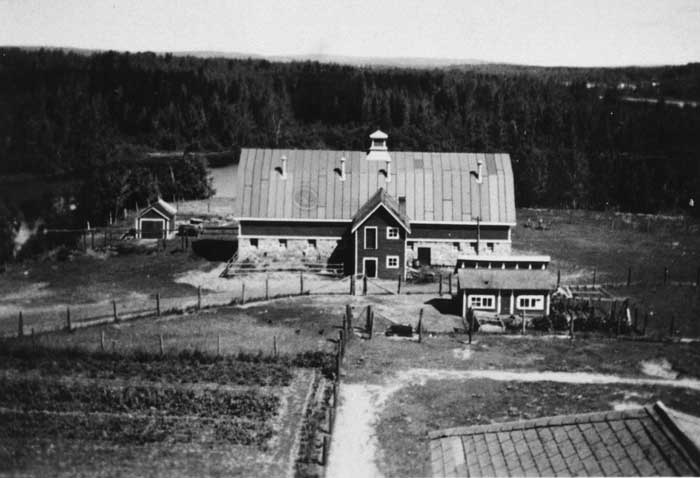
Chapleau Residential School farm, circa 1930

Students came to St. John's School largely from the Diocese of Moosonee region, including New Brunswick House, Chapleau Cree, Missanabie Cree First Nation, Fort Albany, Fort Frances, and Six Nations, Nipigon. As at residential schools across Canada, students at St. John's were forbidden from speaking their traditional Indigenous languages, and harsh punishments were used. Students attended school on a half-day system.

From April 1 to June 30, 1908, seven students out of 31 died while attending the school for "unknown reasons".

In 1921 many parents complained about the Rev. Prewer's role as principal and his treatment of students at the school. That year, over 150 people traveled to Chapleau to voice their complaints over the cruelty and neglect of the children at the school. Depositions were taken from some of these parents and as a result the offending principal was removed within a year

== Principals ==
The following individuals served as principals of the St. John's Indian Residential School:

Name	Dates
Rev. Ernest O. Duke	1908
Rev. P.R. Soanes	1909-1912
Miss G.M. Sutherland	1912 - February 1913
Rev. George E. Prewer	1913-1923
Rev. J.H. Gibson	1912-1927*
Rev. G.T. Snowden (Vice-Principal, Acting Principal)	1925-1927
Rev. Alf J. Vale	1927-1946
Rev. G.A. Crawley	1946-1948

**From July 1925 to May 1927, Rev. Gibson still held formal title of Principal, but due to illness Vice-Principal G.T. Snowden was appointed to take charge of the school.
