= Engracia de Jesus Matias Archives and Special Collections =

- Location: Arthur A. Wishart Library, Algoma University, Sault Ste Marie, Ontario, Canada
- Type: Academic
- Established: 2006 (Algoma University Archives); renamed 2011
- Branches: 1

Collection
- Size: 170 fonds

Other information
- Director: Mark Jones (Library manager)
- Website: http://archives.algomau.ca/

The Engracia de Jesus Matias Archives and Special Collections is a department of the Arthur A.Wishart Library at Algoma University in Sault Ste. Marie, Ontario. It is the official repository for the university's records as well as those of the Anglican Diocese of Algoma and the Ecclesiastical Province of Ontario. It is a partner with the Shingwauk Residential Schools Centre, also located at the university. The archives collects private records of individuals, families, organizations and businesses with a focus on northern Ontario.

== History ==
The Engracia de Jesus Matias Archives and Special Collections (formerly the Algoma University Archives) were established in 2006 and renamed in honour of Engracia de Jesus Matias.

== Collections ==
As of 2016 the archives holds over 170 unique archival fonds or collections. Areas of strength include the history of higher education in Sault Ste. Marie; faculty, staff and student associations at the university, university programming, the industrial history of the Great Lakes region; the railroad history of northern Ontario; the history of the fur trader Charles Oakes Ermatinger and the Ermatinger Old Stone House; the labour history of Sault Ste. Marie; the sinking of the SS Edmund Fitzgerald and Anglican Diocese of Algoma history from Kakabeka Falls the west to the Ontario/Quebec border in the east and from Manitouwadge in the north to Gravenhurst in the south.
