= Shingwauk =

Anishnaabe chief (c. 1773–1854)

Shingwaukonse
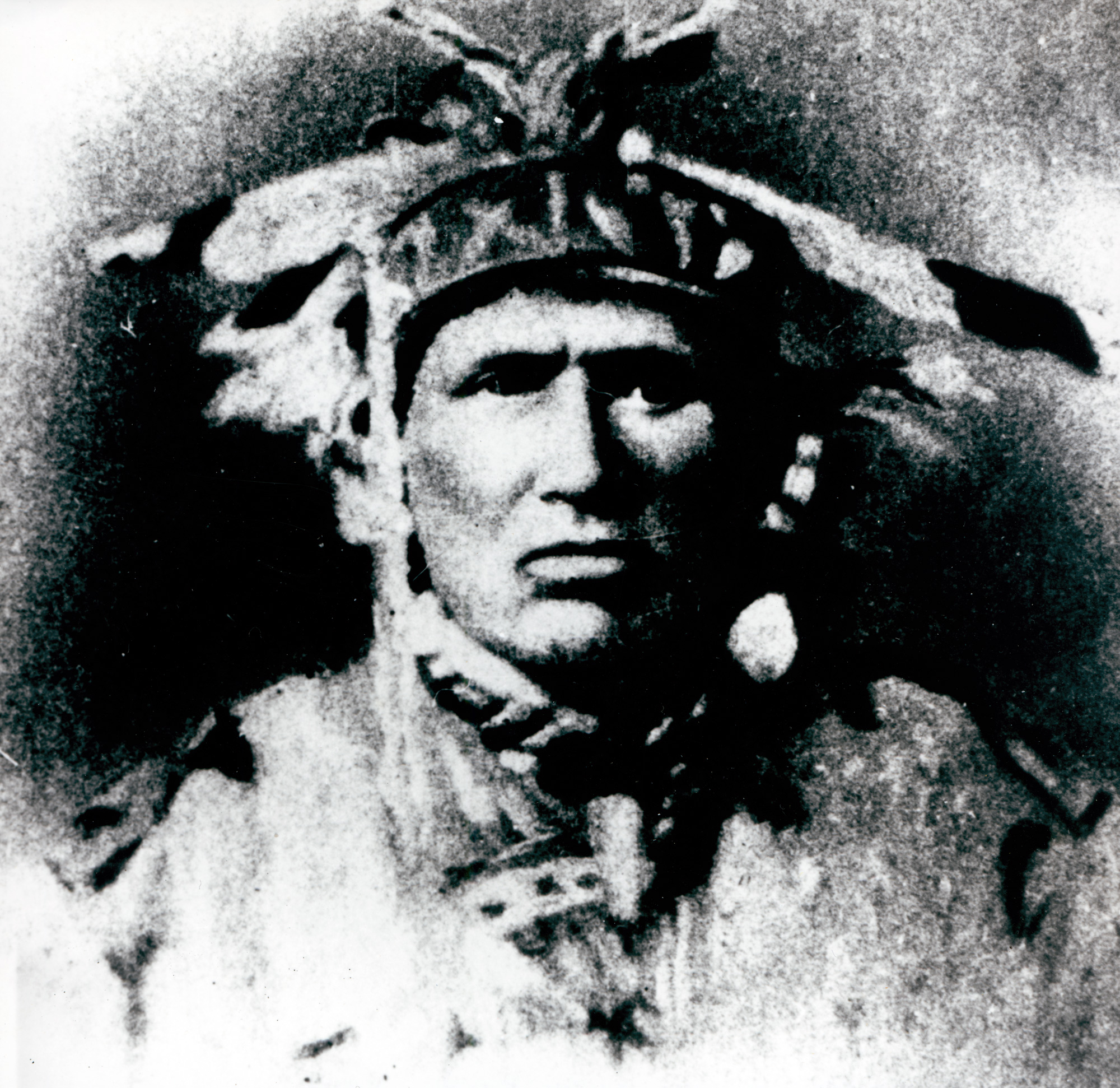
- Chief Shingwauk at Robinson Huron Treaty Signing in 1850
- Born: c. 1773; Garden River, Quebec, British North America
- Died: 1854; Garden River, Canada West
- Other names: Shingwauk, Little Pine, Zhingwaakoons, Shinguacouse
- Citizenship: Ojibwe
- Occupations: Indigenous chief and warrior
- Known for: Taking of Fort Michilimackinac; Signatory to Robinson-Huron Treaty

Shingwaukonse (Fiero spelling: Zhingwaakoons; "Little Pine"), or Shingwauk (Fiero spelling: Zhingwaak; "Pine") (c. 1773–1854) was an Anishnaabe chief, who was instrumental in the establishment of the Garden River First Nation near Sault Ste. Marie, Ontario as a signatory to the Robinson Huron Treaty of 1850.

== Personal life ==
Shingwaukonse was born in the Sault Ste. Marie area in 1773. The names of his parents are unknown, but his father was a Frenchman, and his mother was Ogemahqua (Chief Woman) from the crane clan.

Shingwaukonse had many children including Augustine (1800-1890), Buhgwujjenene (1811-1900), John Askin (1836-1919), and George Menissino (1838-1923). (Fiero spelling: Bagwajinini; "Wildman"), who served as successive hereditary chiefs of Garden River after Shingwauk's death. Augustine served as hereditary chief from 1854-1890 and Buchkwujjene held the position from 1890-1900. Shingwaukonse's youngest son, George Shingwauk (1838-1923) (also known as George Menissino or George Pine), was elected chief of Garden River First Nation from 1899-1902 and again from 1903-1916.

Other less well known children of Shingwauk include: Tegoosh (1796-1876), Thomas Shingwauk (1796-1883), Nahwahquashkum (1799-1840), Jean Baptise Tegoosh (b. 1799), Waintegoochequai (b. 1800), Owiaquahgeyhegoqua (b. 1805), Marie (1816-1887), Ogimaqua (b. 1813), Joseph Shingwauk (b. 1837), and Louis Shingwauk (1839-1899).

He was a well-known member of the Midewiwin lodge and a follower of traditional Anishnaabe religion for most of his life, Shingwauk converted to Anglicanism in approximately 1833. He died in March 1854.

== War of 1812 ==
Shingwaukonse is also known for his role as a national leader, warrior, and war chief during the War of 1812. He fought on the side of the British during the War. He received a handful of commendations for his wartime service including a chief's medal, and the general military service medal. Following the war Lieutenant Governor Sir John Colbourne also bestowed another medal on him for his service. His wartime contributions resulted in him receiving the "deserving chief" status which was granted to Indigenous chiefs in British North America who had served the crown during the War of 1812. Tangibly, this status resulted in preferred treatment by the crown and superior 'presents' from the government during any negotiations.

== Indigenous governance ==
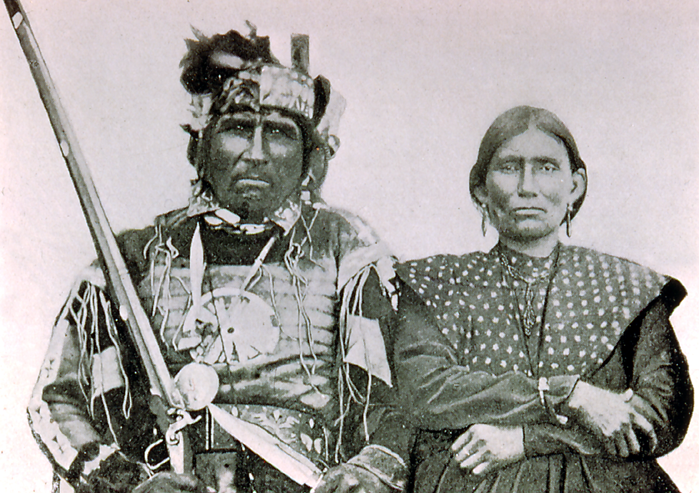
Chief Shingwauk and his wife Ogahbagehequa, c. 1840

Following the War of 1812 Shingwaukonse developed a vision of Indigenous rights and self-determination for his community. He believed in the sharing of resources with European settlers in a way that would benefit the people of Garden River and the creation of a relationship with the crown which allowed for independence and autonomy of his people. Shingwauk's advocacy around land-use rights can be seen in his participation in the Mica Bay Incident, which protested against the Quebec Mining Company.

== Education advocacy ==
In addition to his role as a prominent chief during the war years Shingwauk also strongly advocated education to help the Anishnaabe people preserve their language and culture. In 1832, he snowshoed all the way from Sault Ste. Marie to York to ask Governor John Colborne to provide a teacher for his people. He also advocated the creation of a "Teaching Wigwam Lodge" for his people to learn how to read and write in the English language. This vision would create a space where they can receive education while retaining to their traditions and culture. Shingwauk's vision led to the creation of Shingwauk Kinoomaage Gamig in 2008.

The Shingwauk Indian Residential School was named after Shingwauk. The operation of the residential school did not align with Shingwauk's educational advocacy, it operated as an assimilationist institution, as part of the residential school system in Canada.
