= Algoma University =

Canadian public university

- Former names: Shingwauk Indian Residential School, Algoma University College
- Type: Public
- Established: 1965
- Academic affiliations: COU, Universities Canada
- Chair: Robert Battisti
- Chancellor: Mario Turco
- President: Kofi Campbell
- Location: Brampton, Sault Ste Marie, Timmins, Ontario, Canada
Colours
Algoma Red, Cool Grey Dark, Cool Grey Light
- Nickname: Thunderbirds
- Sporting affiliations: U Sports; OUA
- Mascot: Boomer the Thunderbolt
- Website: algomau.ca

Algoma University, commonly shortened to Algoma U, is a Canadian public university in the province of Ontario, with campuses in Brampton, Sault Ste. Marie, and Timmins. Algoma U offers bachelor's degrees, master's degrees and graduate certificate programs in liberal arts, sciences and professional disciplines.

Algoma University specializes in liberal arts, sciences, management and professional degree programs.

From its founding in 1965 until June 18, 2008, Algoma U was an affiliated college of Laurentian University in Sudbury and was officially known as Algoma University College. The enabling legislation is the Algoma University Act, 2008.

== History ==
=== Shingwauk Hall: From "Teaching Wigwam" to residential school ===
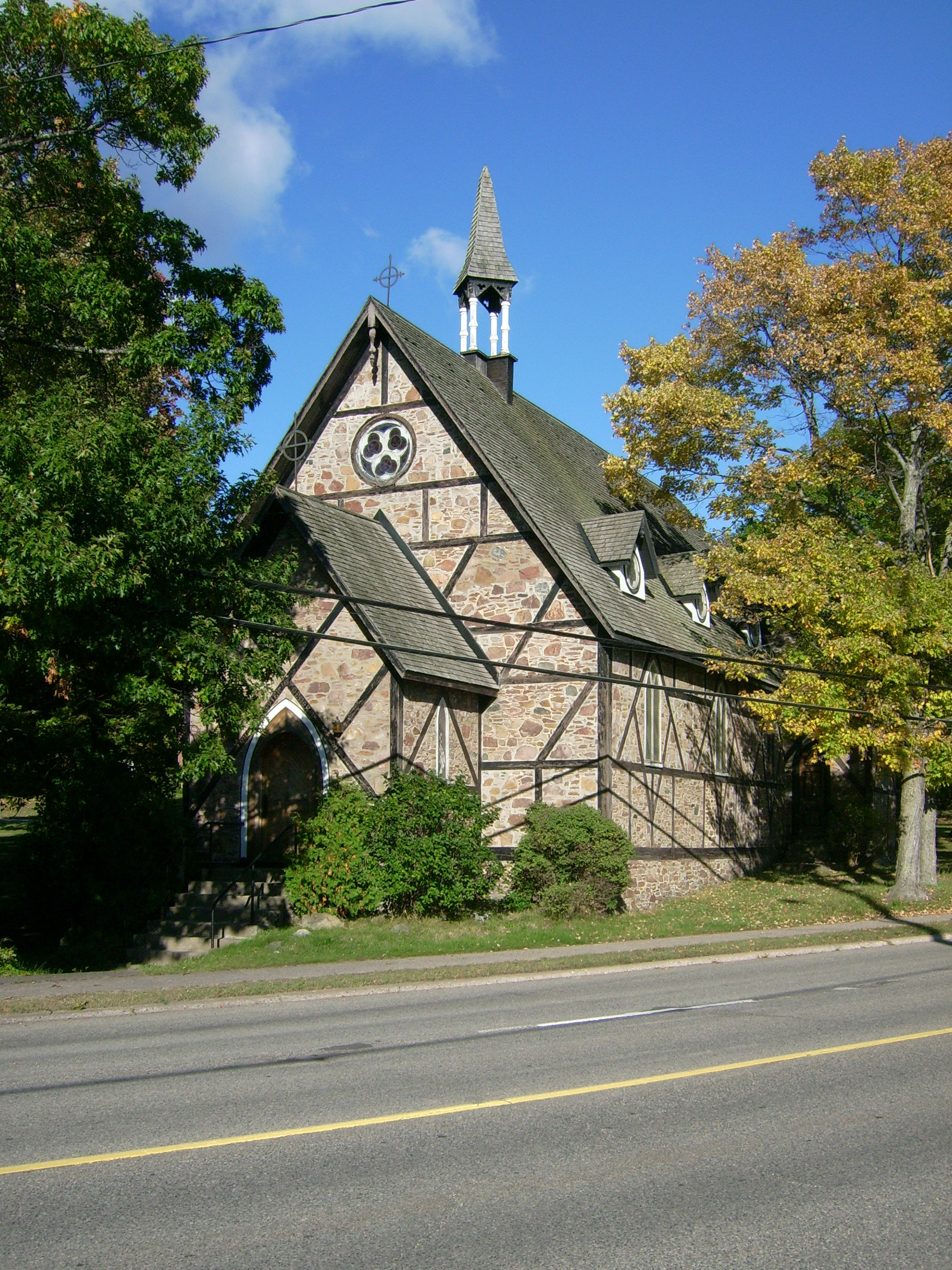
Bishop Fauquier Memorial Chapel

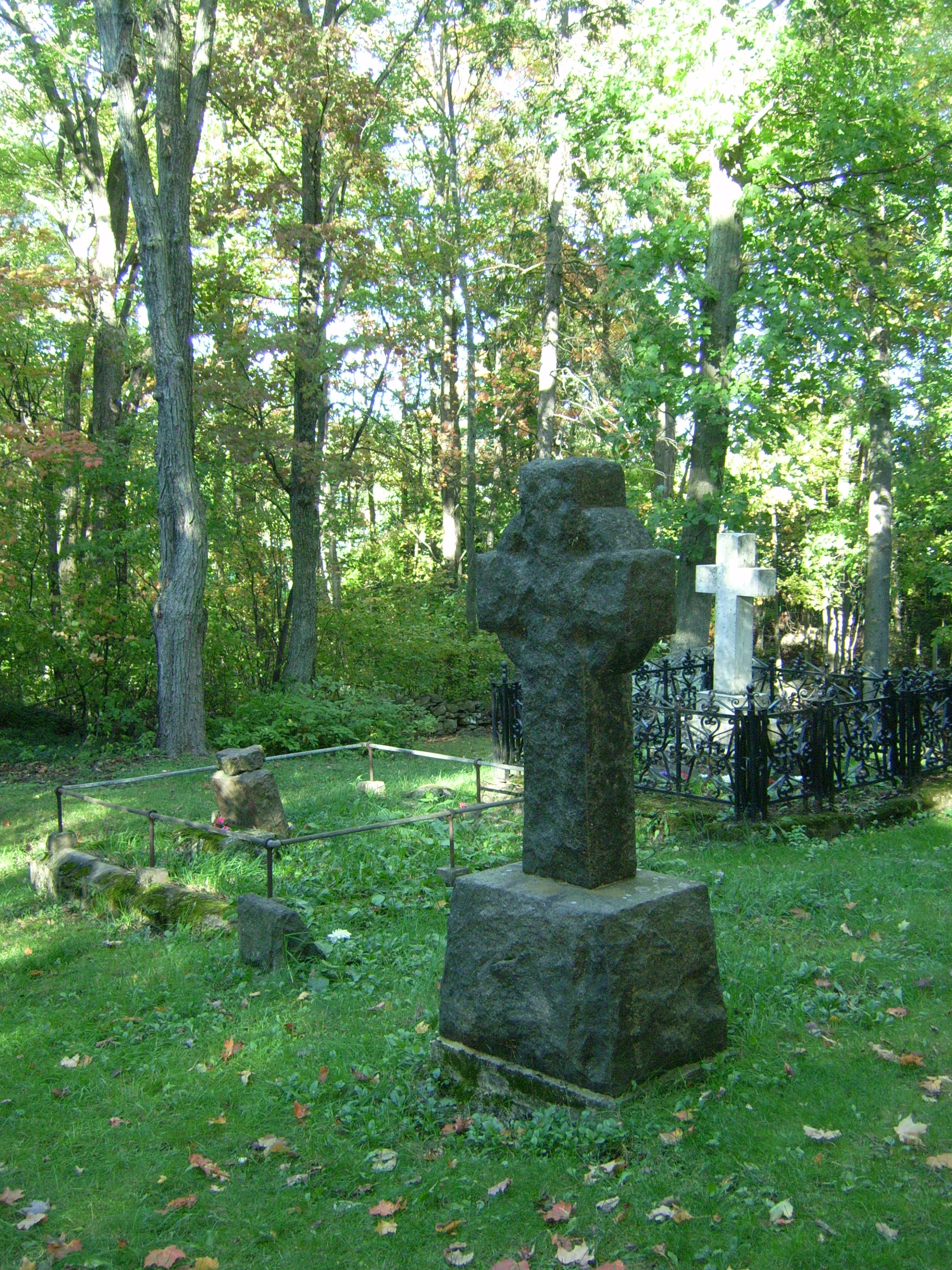
Residential school memorial

The original vision for Shingwauk Hall in the early 19th century came from Chief Shingwauk, the chief of the Garden River First Nation, as he felt "that the future Ojibway needed to learn the white man's academic method of education in order to survive in what was becoming a 'predominately non-native world with non-native values'".

While Chief Shingwauk's vision of a teaching wigwam for his people would not come to fruition in his lifetime, a residential school would eventually receive funding in 1872 from the combined efforts of Chiefs Augustin Shingwauk and Buhkwujjenene Shingwauk (Chief Shingwauk's sons) and the Anglican Missionary, Rev. Edward Francis Wilson. The initial building was constructed in Garden River First Nation in 1873 and housed 16 students. It burnt down 6 days later. A new building was erected in Sault Ste. Marie in 1875.

Shingwauk Hall would become part of the broader residential school system across Canada designed to assimilate Canada's Indigenous peoples, straying far from Chief Shingwauk's vision for a teaching wigwam. Students in the residential school system endured poor living conditions, physical and emotional abuse and segregation from their own family members.

Shingwauk Hall, presently the main building of Algoma University's Sault Ste. Marie campus, was erected in 1935 after it was deemed the Shingwauk Home original building had deteriorated beyond repair. Shingwauk Hall ceased operation as a residential school in 1970.

=== Algoma University College to Algoma University ===
The desire to establish an undergraduate liberal arts college in Sault Ste. Marie originated as a broad citizens' movement in the 1950s. In October 1964, the Algoma College Association was incorporated by letters patent of the province of Ontario. One year later, on Dec. 17 1965, Algoma University College was established as a non-sectarian institution affiliated with Laurentian University after the Affiliation Agreement was signed. In September 1967, Algoma University College began offering courses to its first 77 students at what is today Sault College, formally then known as Cambrian College, under the leadership of Principal Reverend Charles A. Krug (1966–68). The majority of students studying at Algoma University College were mature or "extension" students looking to enhance their post-secondary education by taking first-year Bachelor of Arts (BA) or Bachelor of Science (BSc) courses.

Part-time enrolment expanded to over 1,000 students by 1969–1970. The year 1971 marked a significant turning point in Algoma University College's history in respect to both program and facilities. In May, in recognition of the rapid maturation of the post-secondary institution, the Department of University Affairs approved Algoma University College's request to offer second-and third-year level courses, thereby giving the institution the ability to offer full-time, three-year programming in Bachelor of Arts degrees. In addition, in September 1971, the Algoma University College was relocated to a new site, acquiring by lease Shingwauk Hall and the former Shingwauk Indian Residential School site. In 1975, with the assistance of a grant from the Ministry of Colleges and Universities, the college purchased Shingwauk Hall and 37 acres (15 ha) of land surrounding the buildings. Algoma University College would later purchase Shingwauk Hall.

The Shingwauk Project was founded in 1979, which laid the foundation for the reaffirmation of a positive and respectful relationship between the post-secondary institution and First Nations people. Algoma University College also received its own emblem, the Thunderbird, as designed by Dora de Pedery-Hunt in 1972.

Construction began to further enhance the new site of Algoma University College. In 1989, the Arthur A. Wishart Library opened, followed by the opening of the George Leach Centre in 1992. Student residence buildings were constructed in 1995 and 2001, and later in 2012. In 2005, a $6 million technology wing was opened, which included state-of-the-art technology and computer labs, the 'Great West Life Amphitheatre' (a 250+ seat lecture hall), a new student centre, cafeteria, faculty offices, a bookstore and campus shop, and a new pub. During this time, academic programming also expanded tenfold, with many of Algoma University College's programs becoming four-year Bachelor of Arts and Bachelor of Science honours programs.

On May 19, 2006, Algoma University College entered into a new relationship, which further entrenched its pre-existing relationship with First Nations people. Algoma University College and Shingwauk Education Trust (SET) / Shingwauk Kinoomaage Gamig (SKG) signed the Covenant, which demonstrated the two parties' agreement to work together alongside each other in the pursuit of their goals to provide quality education to Anishinaabe students and students of all cultural backgrounds.

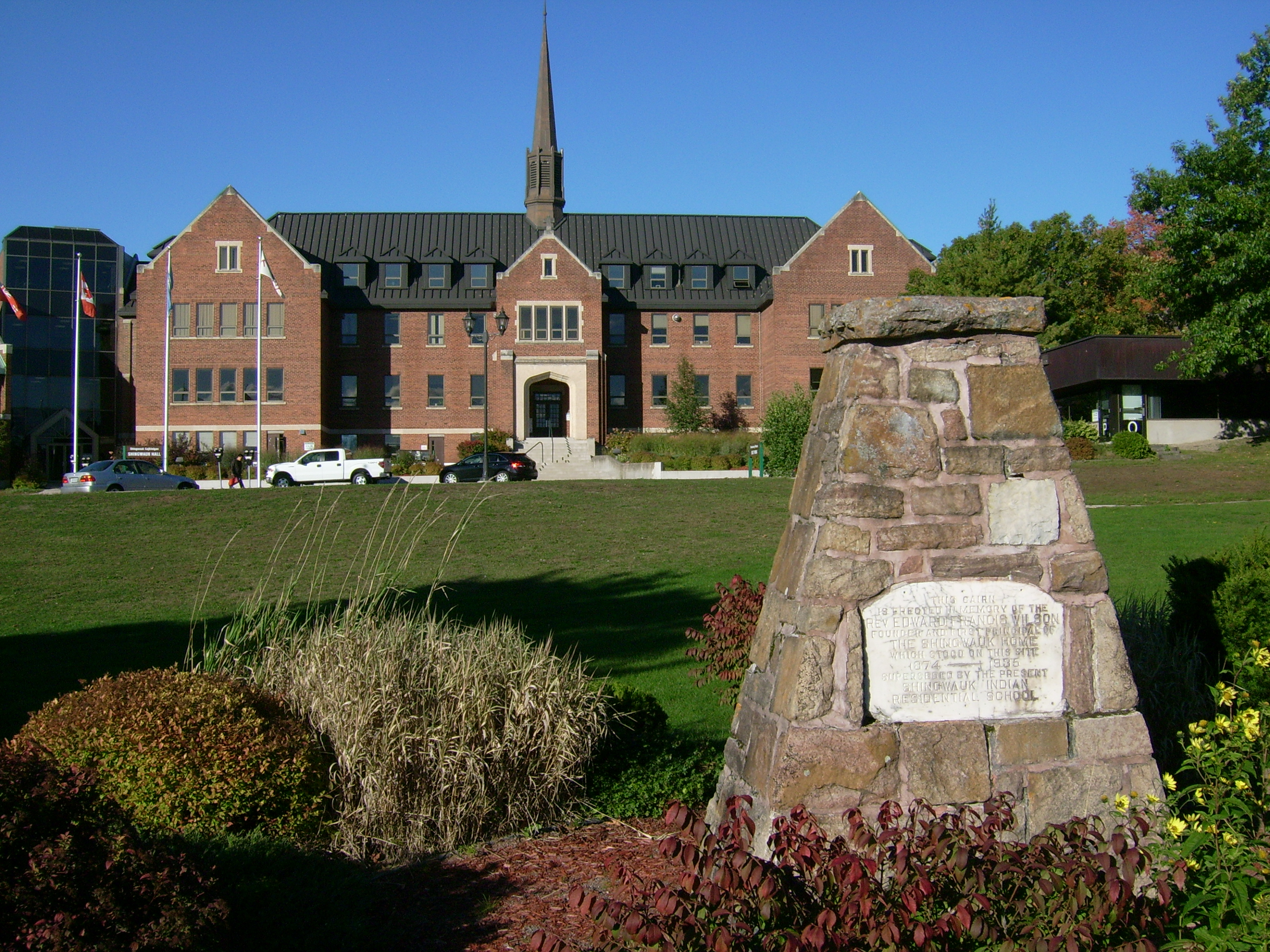
Algoma University campus in 2012

Algoma's independence from Laurentian University was first proposed in 1994. The original proposal would have seen the school renamed Shingwauk University, but it was not ultimately pursued by the MTCU. On May 31, 2007, the government of Ontario announced that it would introduce legislation to charter Algoma University College as a fully independent university. After the government passed the Algoma University Act, it was given royal assent by David Onley, the Lieutenant Governor of Ontario, on June 18, 2008. On July 13, 2009, Algoma University conferred its first degrees as an independent university, with 60 students earning Algoma University degrees.

In 2013 Algoma hired Myles McLellan as a law professor. McLellan had been disbarred by the Law Society in 2009 and was subsequently convicted of mortgage fraud, serving a 22-month sentence. He taught at the college until 2021, during which time he completed his Ph.D. on wrongful conviction law and published Compensation for Wrongful Convictions in Canada. Having experienced the humiliation of incarceration, he became a strong advocate for the wrongfully convicted, most notably as founding editor of the Wrongful Conviction Law Review based at the University of Alberta, and executive director of Miscarriage of Justice Canada (MJC), which represents persons who claim to have been wrongfully convicted.

In 2021, Algoma began examining the campus for unmarked graves from the time as the Shingwauk Indian Residential School. Three months later a search was undertaken. Federal government officials refused to release names that would allow the identification of deceased children. In 2023, questions still remained as to the number of graves underneath the campus.

=== Focus on international students ===
A 2022 Ontario Auditor General report cited Algoma as "overburdened by debt in 2016/17" the university began a strategy of mass enrolment of Indian international students at its Brampton campus. From 540 students in 2021/22 the population exploded by 900% over the next three years to 5,372.

In 2023, a group of Algoma students reported a tuition payment fraud perpetrated by a fellow student that left them owing tens of thousands of dollars.

In 2024, days of protests were held by international students at the Brampton Campus. The protest was later joined by students from other campuses, many of whom alleged racial bias. The students called for a third-party review of Algoma's grading practices. International students claim the protests resulted in the university changing the failing grades of a hundred students in a computer class to passing grades. Algoma publicly denied the students assertions. Later that year Algoma computer science professor Michael Lajoie, who had been charged multiple times with sexual assault in 2023, was convicted of assaulting students. In July, Algoma Faculty association took an overwhelming vote of no confidence in the university's leadership in 2024. The no-confidence vote was later backed by support staff. Algoma's Board of Governor's maintained they had full confidence in the president.

== Programs ==
Algoma University offers bachelor's degrees and master's degrees in disciplines such as biology, business, economics, computer science, community development, English, geography, history, psychology, social work, sociology, political science, music and fine arts.

It also offers undergraduate-certificate and graduate-certificate programs in disciplines such as Construction Project Management, IT Project Management, Information Technology, Human Resources Management, Business, and in unique streams such as E-Sports Management and Aviation Management.

== Partnerships ==
=== Learners Early Access Program (LEAP) ===
In 2023, Algoma University created formal partnerships with the Peel District School Board (PDSB) and the Dufferin-Peel Catholic District School Board (DPCDSB) to offer the Learners Early Access Program (LEAP). LEAP invites Grade 11 and 12 students from the Peel region to spend a semester on the Algoma University campus in Brampton in an on-campus state-of-the-art classroom, providing them with the opportunity to take two university courses (six credits) while they complete their high school requirements. LEAP focuses on students who belong to groups traditionally under-represented on university campuses, including Black and Indigenous students.

=== UArctic ===
Algoma University is an active member of the University of the Arctic. UArctic is an international cooperative network based in the Circumpolar Arctic region, consisting of more than 200 universities, colleges, and other organizations with an interest in promoting education and research in the Arctic region.

Algoma University participates in UArctic's mobility program north2north. The aim of that program is to enable students of member institutions to study in different parts of the North.

=== Other partnerships ===
The Algoma Conservatory of Music, which offers music lessons to about 1,000 students in the community, has a working relationship with Algoma.

Concurrently with Algoma's charter as an independent university, Shingwauk Kinoomaage Gamig, an Anishinaabe cultural and linguistic federated school opened in the fall of 2008.

The university has diploma-to-degree agreements with Cambrian College, Confederation College, George Brown College, Humber College, Mohawk College, Northern College, Sheridan College, Sault College and Seneca College, as well as a number of student exchange programs, such as the agreement with the University of the Sunshine Coast in Queensland, Australia, and study-abroad or travel programs.

== Libraries and archives ==
The Arthur A. Wishart Library at Algoma University is a member of the Ontario Council of University Libraries and is a contributor to Open Content Alliance.

There are two distinct archival repositories at Algoma University: the Engracia de Jesus Matias Archives and Special Collections and the Shingwauk Residential Schools Centre. The Engracia de Jesus Matias Archives and Special Collections is the official repository for records of Algoma University, the Anglican Diocese of Algoma and the Ecclesiastical Province of Ontario. The Engracia de Jesus Matias Archives and Special Collections strengths are in Northern Ontario business history, Algoma University institutional history, industrial history of the Great Lakes region and the history of the Algoma region more broadly. The Shingwauk Residential Schools Centre (SRSC) is a community based archive jointly managed with the Children of Shingwauk Alumni Association dedicated to documenting the legacy of residential schools in Canada. The SRSC holds one of the largest residential school archival collections in North America.

== Campuses ==
=== Brampton campus ===
In Brampton, the university offers an urban option for Algoma University students.

In Brampton, Algoma University occupies more than seven buildings, most surrounding historic Garden Square, including 8 Queen St. E, 24 Queen St. E and 28 Main St.

=== Sault Ste. Marie campus ===
==== Shingwauk Hall and adjacent wings (East, West and North-West) ====
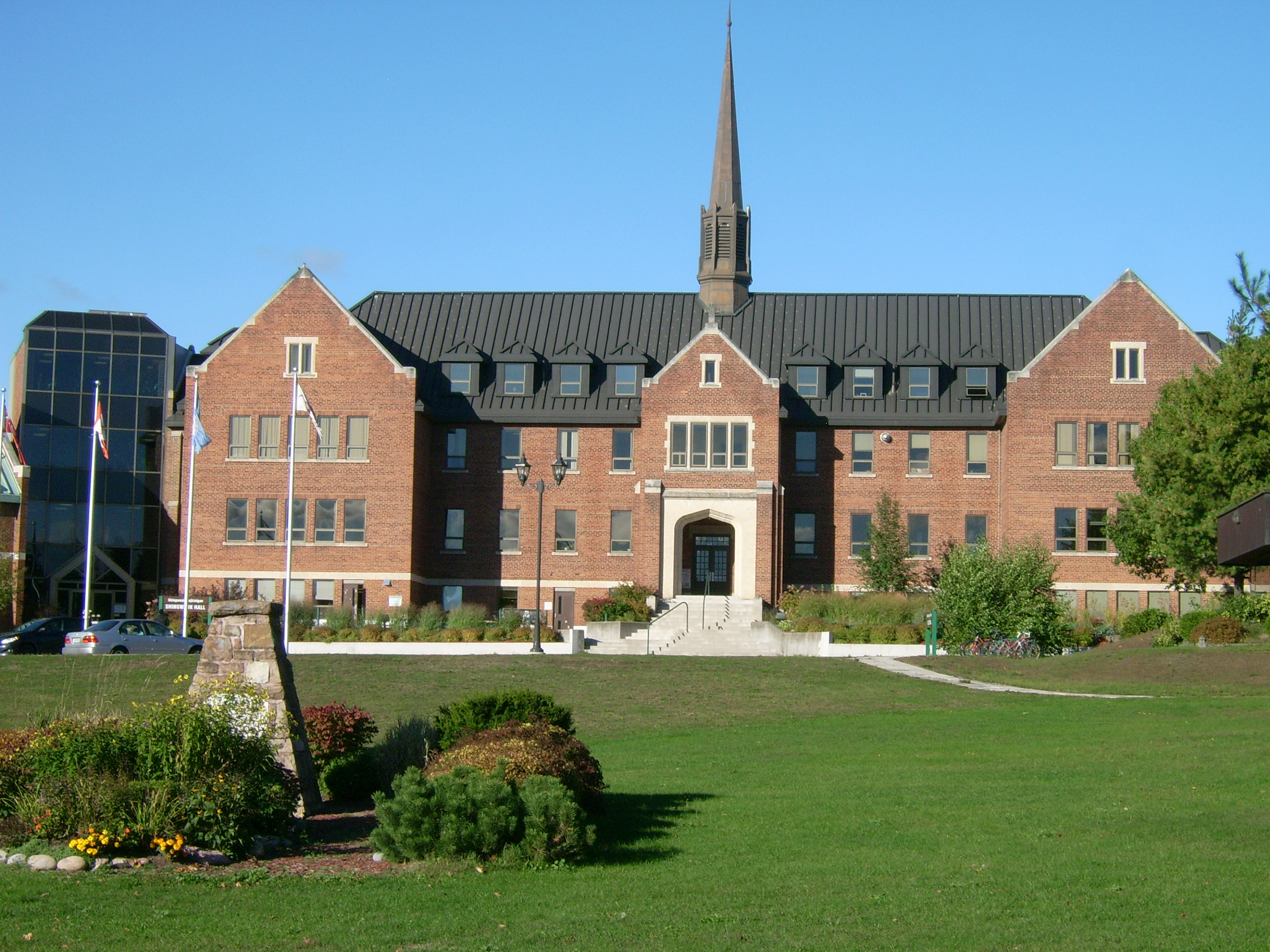
Shingwauk Hall

Shingwauk Hall is currently used to house various classrooms, as well as administrative and faculty offices. It is connected on the first, second and third levels by links to the newer East, West and North-West wings that house further classrooms, research space and offices.

In 2025 the East Wing of the university was decommissioned and demolished in preparation for the construction of the new Makwa Waakaa'igan building.

==== Convergence Centre ====
In 2009 Algoma received more than $16 million to build a biosciences and technology convergence centre. Ground was broken for the new building in September 2009. Along with state-of-the-art classroom and laboratory space for students and professors, the building is home to various research institutes, including the Health Informatics Research Institute, the Invasive Species Research Institute, the Sault Ste. Marie Innovation Centre and Algoma Games for Health. The building opened its doors to students in September 2011 and was officially named the Convergence Centre in a ceremony including David Johnston, Governor General of Canada, in August 2012.

Makwa Waakaa'igan

An earth turning ceremony for this new space occurred in June 2025. Once completed, Makwa Waakaa'igan will be a centre of cultural excellence focused on honouring Indigenous knowledges and experiences. The facility will include space for the Shingwauk Residential Schools Centre, the Children of Shingwauk Alumni Association, culturally-appropriate learning spaces and cultural areas. It is currently anticipated to open in early 2027.

==== George Leach Centre ====
The George Leach Centre (GLC), the home of the Algoma Thunderbirds, is located on the university's campus. Built in 1992, and named after Algoma University's first Athletics Director, the GLC provides Algoma University students and community members with access to fitness equipment. The GLC also hosts regional, provincial, and national level competitions.

In March 2015, the GLC opened a new 10,000-square-foot expansion, in addition to its 39,000-square foot pre-existing structure. This new weight room fitness space features new strength and cardio equipment. These large spaces overlook the campus.

The gymnasium, or field house, features three regulation court surfaces, which accommodate a wide range of athletic activities such as badminton, basketball, volleyball, and tennis. The gym area is surrounded by a 1/9th mile indoor walking and jogging track. The GLC also has a sauna, change rooms with lockers, varsity change rooms, and private change rooms for refereeing officials.

==== The Speakeasy ====
The Speakeasy is Algoma University's student centre. Attached to the cafeteria, The Speakeasy operates as a patio, pub, and entertainment hub.

In 2020, AUSU, (the Algoma University Students' Union), invested about $1.7 million to renovate the Speakeasy facilities.

==== Residences ====
===== Dr. Lou Lukenda Dormitory =====
Built in September 2003, the facility contains 45 single bedrooms.

===== Spirit Village Townhouse =====
The entire complex consists of 15 townhouses, housing 75 students. Each townhouse unit has five single bedrooms, two bathrooms, a common kitchen and living room.

===== Algoma Dormitory, (known colloquially as "The New Dorm") =====
With construction starting in late 2011, a new residence building opened at Algoma University for the start of the 2012 school year. Housing over 96 students, Algoma Dormitory is furnished with an open concept area, a single bed, wardrobe and a desk with a high speed wireless internet connection. The student shares a bathroom with another roommate of the same sex. There is a shared common room on each floor of the complex with microwaves and HD TV with satellite.

=== Timmins campus ===
Algoma University at Timmins offers bachelor's degrees in Social Work and Community Development on the campus of Northern College in South Porcupine. These programs are designed for diploma-to-degree or university transfer students.

== Student life ==
Demographics of student body (2014–15)
	Undergraduate	Graduate
Male	52.5%	—N/a
Female	47.5%	—N/a
Canadian student	73.5%	—N/a
International student	26.5%	—N/a

The Algoma University Thunderbirds participate in the Ontario University Athletics (OUA) and U Sports conferences in the sports of basketball, soccer, cross-country running, curling, wrestling, and Nordic skiing. Prior to making the move to the OUA and CIS in 2013, the Algoma Thunderbirds competed in the Ontario Colleges Athletics Association (OCAA) in the sports of basketball, curling, and indoor soccer.

The students are represented by the Algoma University Students' Union (AUSU). AUSU is local 82 of the Canadian Federation of Students. Anishinaabe students of Algoma University have an active Shingwauk Anishinaabe Students' Association (SASA) and are represented on the Algoma University Student Union executive, the Anishinaabe Peoples Council (an advisory committee of the Board of Governors) and the Cross Cultural Committee.

Student Publications

The university's student newspaper operated by AUSU is The Sentient. As of Summer 2026 the newspaper was not operational. The Engracia de Jesus Matias Archives and Special Collections holds a back issues of the newspaper.

Algoma has also published an annual juried literary journal, Algoma Ink.

In 2024, Algoma began publishing The Algomian an online literary journal which provides a publishing platform to the Algoma community. The journal is focused on a range of creative writing practices.

== See also ==
- List of Ontario Universities
- Ontario Student Assistance Program
- Higher education in Ontario
- Canadian government scientific research organizations
- Canadian university scientific research organizations
- Canadian industrial research and development organizations
