= Shingwauk Indian Residential School =

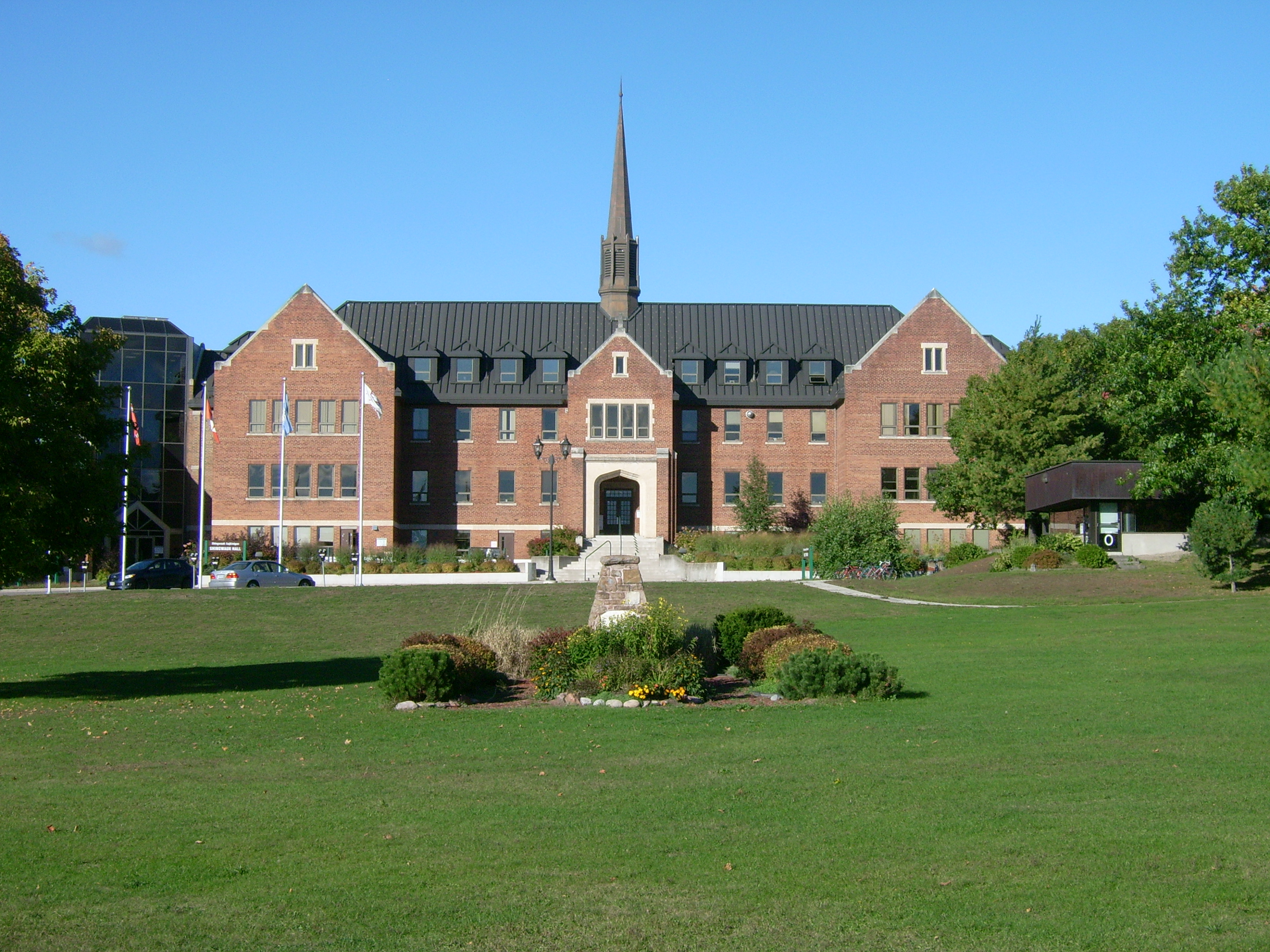
- Shingwauk Hall, now the central building of Algoma University.
- Interactive map of Shingwauk Indian Residential School
- Type: Residential school
- Location: Sault Ste Marie, Ontario

History
- Built: original building, 1874; Shingwauk Home, 1875; Shingwauk Hall, 1935

Site notes
- Architect: Roland Gurney Orr
- Owner: Algoma University, Shingwauk Education Trust

Shingwauk Indian Residential School was a Canadian residential school for First Nations, Métis, and Inuit children that operated in Canada between 1873 and 1970 in Sault Ste. Marie, Ontario, by the Anglican Church of Canada and the Government of Canada.

Today, Shingwauk Hall, built in 1935, forms the central building of Algoma University.

== History ==
=== Early Indian Schools in Sault Ste. Marie ===
Prior to the establishment of the Shingwauk School, smaller mission schools existed in Sault Ste. Marie.

In the 1830s, Chief Shingwauk traveled by canoe and snowshoe to York (now Toronto) to petition Governor John Colborne to provide resources for a 'Teaching Wigwam' in Garden River.

In 1833 William McMurray, an Anglican missionary arrived in Garden River First Nation. His arrival resulted in the establishment of a day school at the top of Pim Hill in Sault Ste. Marie. This day school was attended by children from Garden River First Nation and was funded by the government and the Anglican Church. A second day mission school was later established in the Garden River community in 1870.

=== Shingwauk Industrial Home ===
In 1871, Anglican Missionary Reverend Edward Francis Wilson arrived in Garden River First Nation. He worked with the Anglican Church, government, and local First Nation community to raise money for a school. As a result of his fundraising efforts, the first Shingwauk Industrial Home opened on September 22, 1873, in Garden River First Nation. The school opened with sixteen boys enrolled as students. Six days after opening, the school was completely destroyed by fire.

=== Shingwauk Home ===
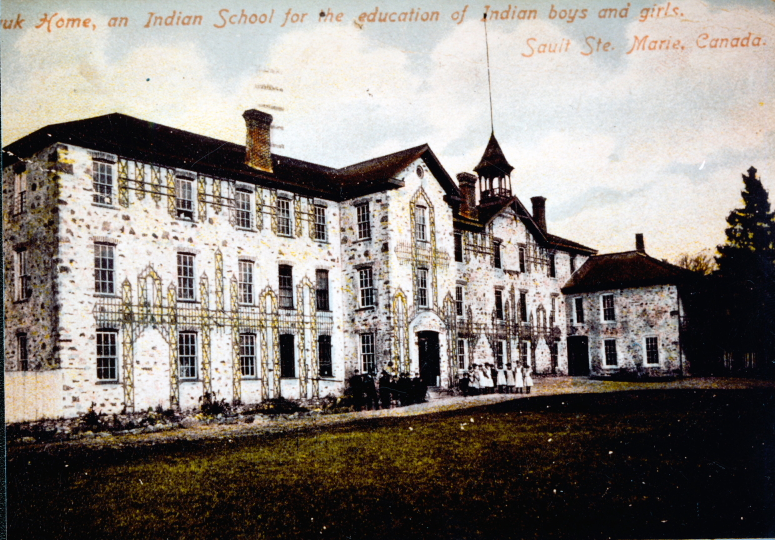
Shingwauk Home, 1880

Following the destruction of the School in Garden River, Wilson purchased a 90-acre site in Sault Ste. Marie, at what is now known as 1520 Queen Street East. On July 31, 1874, the Earl of Dufferin, Governor General of Canada visited the school site and laid the cornerstone of what would become the Shingwauk Home. The new school officially opened on August 2, 1875, to 50 students. The school did not have running water or electricity. This building was replaced by the New Shingwauk Hall in 1935.

=== Wawanosh Home ===
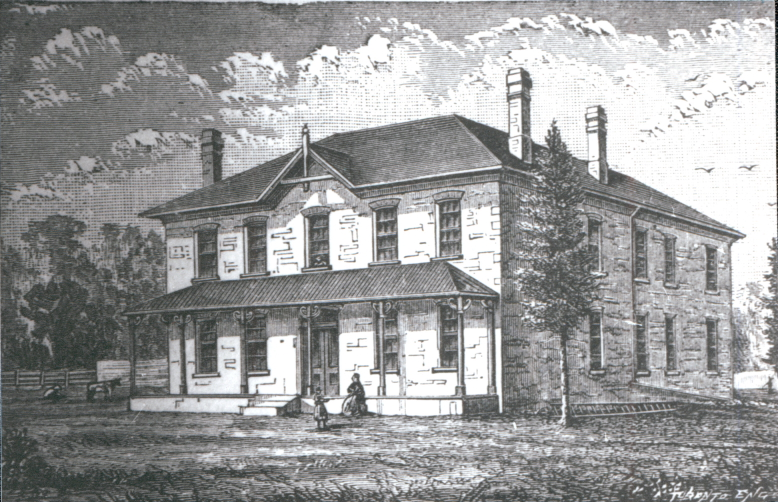
Wawanosh Home, 1900

The Shingwauk Home building was not designed to accommodate both male and female students. As a result, the Wawanosh Home, a separate girls residential school, was established five km away in Tarentorus. The school opened in 1877 with an initial enrollment of ten female students. Construction continued on the Wawanosh Home until 1879 when the school was opened in earnest and enrollment increased to 15 students. The government provided funding of $600 per year for the industrial educational of the Wawanosh students. The Wawanosh Home was administered by the Anglican Church and overseen by Shingwauk Home principal Rev. E.F. Wilson.

By the mid-1880s Wilson decided that the Wawanosh Home could be more effectively managed if the girls were located on the same site as the Shingwauk Home. As a result, a girls wing was added onto the Shingwauk Home on Queen Street. In 1900 the Wawanosh Home officially relocated to the Shingwauk site.

The old Wawanosh Home was purchased by the Children's Aid Society of Algoma. The building was operated as a shelter from 1912 to 1955. Now the site is home to the Sault Ste. Marie Legion Hall, branch 25

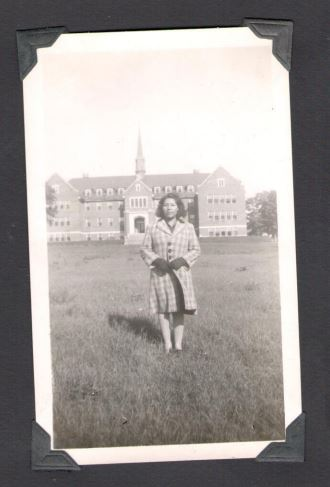
Miss Irene Dowen SS Marie Ont 1945 Shingwauk School

=== New Shingwauk Indian Residential School ===
In 1935 the new Shingwauk Hall opened on the Shingwauk site, immediately behind the old building. This new building was designed for 140 students and contained many modern conveniences such as running water and electricity that the old Shingwauk Home did not have. New Shingwauk Hall was designed by Roland Gurney Orr the Chief Architect for the Department of Indian Affairs, the building was built in an industrial style that was replicated in many residential schools and government building across Canada. Many of Orr's buildings, including Shingwauk Hall were designed in the Collegiate Gothic style. The architecture of the Shingwauk building is almost identical to other residential schools across Canada - including the Indian Residential School in Edmonton, Alberta, the Kamloops Residential School, and the St. Paul's Indian Residential School - all built in the 1920s based on Orr's plans.

The Shingwauk School was closed by the Department of Indian Affairs in June 1970. Algoma University College moved onto the Shingwauk site in 1971 and the Shingwauk Hall building is presently the main building of Algoma University. Until April 1, 1969, all iterations of the Shingwauk Residential School were operated by the Missionary Society of the Church of England. From April 1 to the closure of the Shingwauk School on June 30, 1970, the Government of Canada took over the administration of the church. Despite this transfer of administrative power the land held by the Shingwauk School remained in the hands of the Diocese of Algoma. This was due to a previous agreement that stipulated that the cost of the land or the land itself would be transferred back to the Diocese at the conclusion of use by the Government.

== School chapel ==
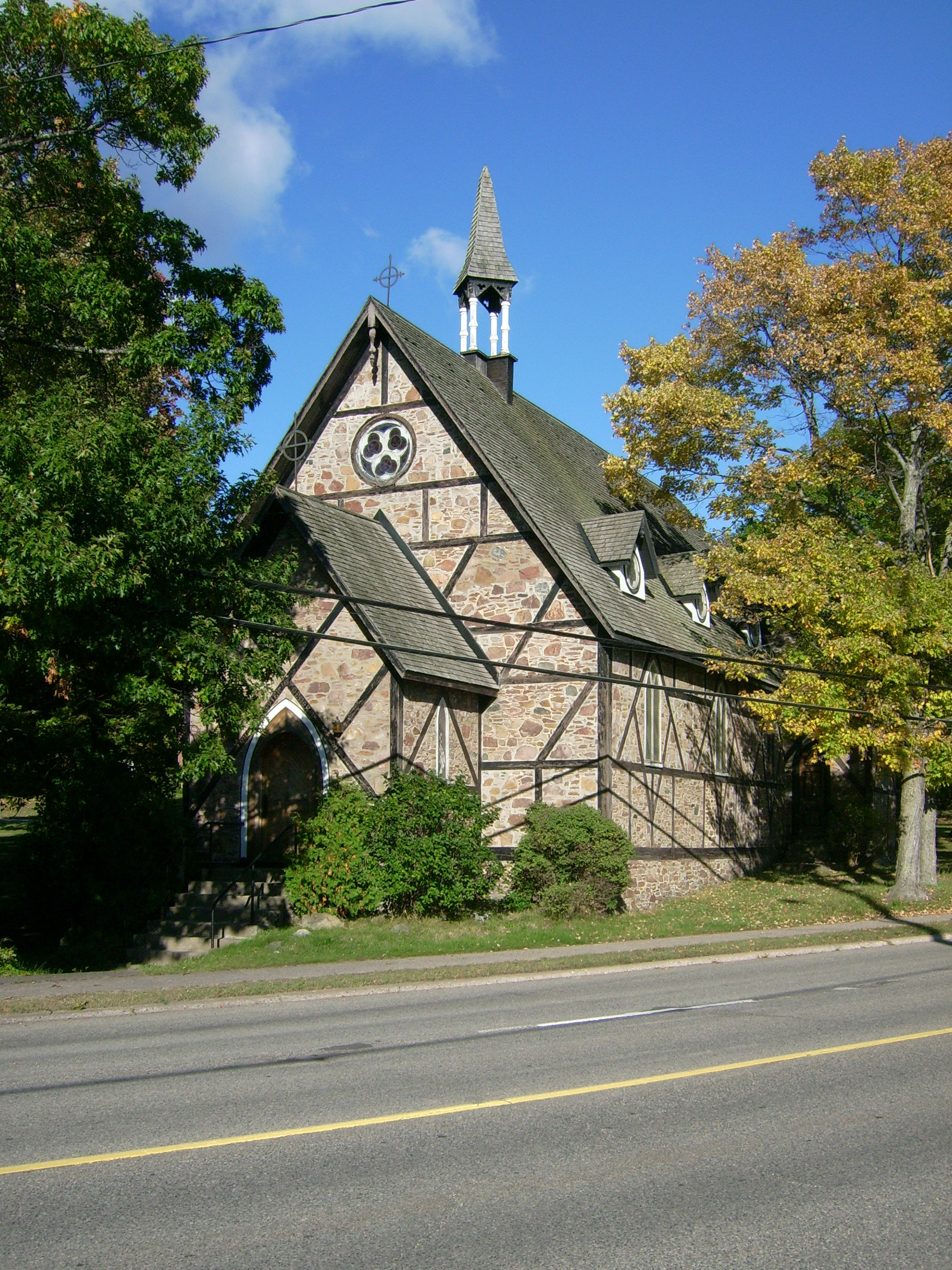
Bishop Fauquier Memorial Chapel, present day

The Bishop Fauquier Memorial Chapel is the only remaining building from the early years of the Shingwauk School. Construction of the chapel began in 1881 and was completed in 1883. It was constructed under the guidance of Edward Francis Wilson, who also designed the building. The building is a mixture of Gothic and Tudor architectural styles and was constructed using sandstone found locally in Sault Ste. Marie, Ontario. It was consecrated by Anglican Diocese of Algoma Bishop Edward Sullivan on August 29, 1883.

The chapel is named after Bishop Frederick Dawson Fauquier, the first Bishop of the Anglican Diocese of Algoma. During the operation of the Shingwauk Indian Residential School students and staff attended weekly services at the chapel and the building was also used for weddings, funerals, and special occasions.

In 1981 the chapel was designated as a heritage site under the Ontario Heritage Act by the City of Sault Ste. Marie.

== School cemetery and student death ==
The Shingwauk Memorial Cemetery contains the graves of over 120 students and staff of the Shingwauk Indian Residential School. It is located in a wood lot northeast of Shingwauk Hall next to Snowdon Park. Many of these graves are unmarked. During the residential school era staff and church officials received stone headstones but the majority of the students' graves were marked with wooden crosses. As a result of vandalism and the deterioration of wood none of these wooden crosses are left.

The land for the cemetery was donated to the Shingwauk School by William Stratton, the owner of the adjacent farm to the Shingwauk School. The cemetery was consecrated by Bishop Frederick Dawson Fauquier on June 2, 1876. The stone wall which surrounds the older original portion of the cemetery was constructed by the students of the Shingwauk School.

In 1988 the Children of Shingwauk Alumni Association and other concerned survivors of the Shingwauk school erected a monument in memory of all who are buried in the cemetery. A list of known individuals buried was created to accompany this monument, copies are held in the Bishop Fauquier Memorial Chapel and the Shingwauk Residential Schools Centre at Algoma University. In 2021, the Shingwauk Residential Schools Centre created an updated burial register with additional names of those buried in the cemetery. Deaths at the Shingwauk Residential School are also part of the National Memorial Register created by the National Centre for Truth and Reconciliation.

Following the 2021 discovery of unmarked burials at the Kamloops Indian Residential School, a site search for unmarked burials at the Shingwauk School began in September 2021.

== Life at Shingwauk ==
At its peak over 150 students were living and attending school at the Shingwauk Indian Residential School. During the Shingwauk Home era, the school was operated on the industrial school model. A model similar to that of the manual labor college in the United States, in these schools, students would attend classes for half a day and do manual labor around the school for the other half. The Shingwauk Home was designed as a self-sufficient institution with a fully functioning farm. Much of the work the students engaged in related to the day-to-day operation of the farm and school.

Similar to other residential schools across Canada there were poor living conditions at Shingwauk and the quality of education that many children received was sub-par. Many survivors from Shingwauk have spoken about abuse, neglect, and the long-term impacts of the assimilation process that occurred at residential schools. In latter years, many of the residents at the Shingwauk Home lived at the Home but went to school at nearby elementary and high schools. Anna McCrea Public School and Sir James Dunn Collegiate and Vocational School (operated by the Algoma District School Board) were built on the original Shingwauk site in the 1950s as part of a government led integration process.

== Publications ==
=== Our Forest Children ===
A monthly periodical called Our Forest Children, edited by Shingwauk principal Rev. E.F. Wilson, was published out a printmaking shop on the site of the Shingwauk Home. Students at the Shingwauk Home would have worked at the printmaking shop as part of their manual or industrial school labour. Our Forest Children was published in the supposed interest of Indian Education and Civilization. Active between 1887 and 1907, the publication was published monthly, claiming sixteen to twenty pages each. The paper sold for 10 cents a year and had a self-reported circulation of 2,000 subscribers.

Boasting themselves as the only illustrated magazine providing detailed information about the Indian tribes of North America, their articles include details of the student's lives in the schools, the missionaries' experiences interacting with the Indians, some details on recruitment practices, as well as the missionary goals and viewpoints. Included are tidbits of grammar and vocabulary, and cultural practices from different tribes, provided within each issue. Scattered throughout are insights into how certain tribes reacted to their mission, and the opinions some individuals held on Residential schooling, and Christianity. All while keeping the focus on the Education and Christian Training of young Indians in Boarding Schools and Industrial Homes.

=== Algoma Missionary News and Shingwauk Journal ===
This paper was established as the first diocesan newspaper in the Algoma region by Rev. E.F. Wilson in 1874. It underwent substantial name changes through the years and was known as the Algoma Quarterly and the Algoma Missionary News and Shingwauk Journal. In 1956, the publication was replaced by Algoma Anglican. The publication and its editorship was transferred to the Anglican Diocese of Algoma following the departure of Wilson from the Shingwauk Home. A complete set of back issues of the Algoma Missionary News and the Algoma Anglican are housed in the Anglican Diocese of Algoma Archives at Algoma University.

=== The Peace Pipe ===
The first issue of The Peace Pipe was published on October 1, 1878. The tagline of the paper was "an Ojibway newspaper published monthly at the Shingwauk Home". Subscriptions were available for 35 cents a year. The paper had an eight-page form and aimed to start with 300 subscribers. It hoped to cover topics in both English and Ojibway and include translations of bible verses, hymns, and extracts from Ojibway grammar books. This publication served as a supplement to the Algoma Missionary News.

== School principals ==
Principal Name	Years
Rev. E.F. Wilson	1873-1893
Rev. James Irvine	1893-1894
James Lawler	1894
George Ley King	1897-1906
Rev. Benjamin P. Fuller	1910-1929
Rev. Charles F. Hives	1929-1941
Rev. Canon Arthur E. Minchin	1941-1948
Rev. Douglas C. Wickenden	1948-1954
Rev. Roy Phillips	1954-1966
Robert Martin	1964-1965
David Lawson	1966-1967
Alan Wheatley (administrator)	1967-1968
Rev. Noel Goater (administrator)	1968-1970

== Memorials ==
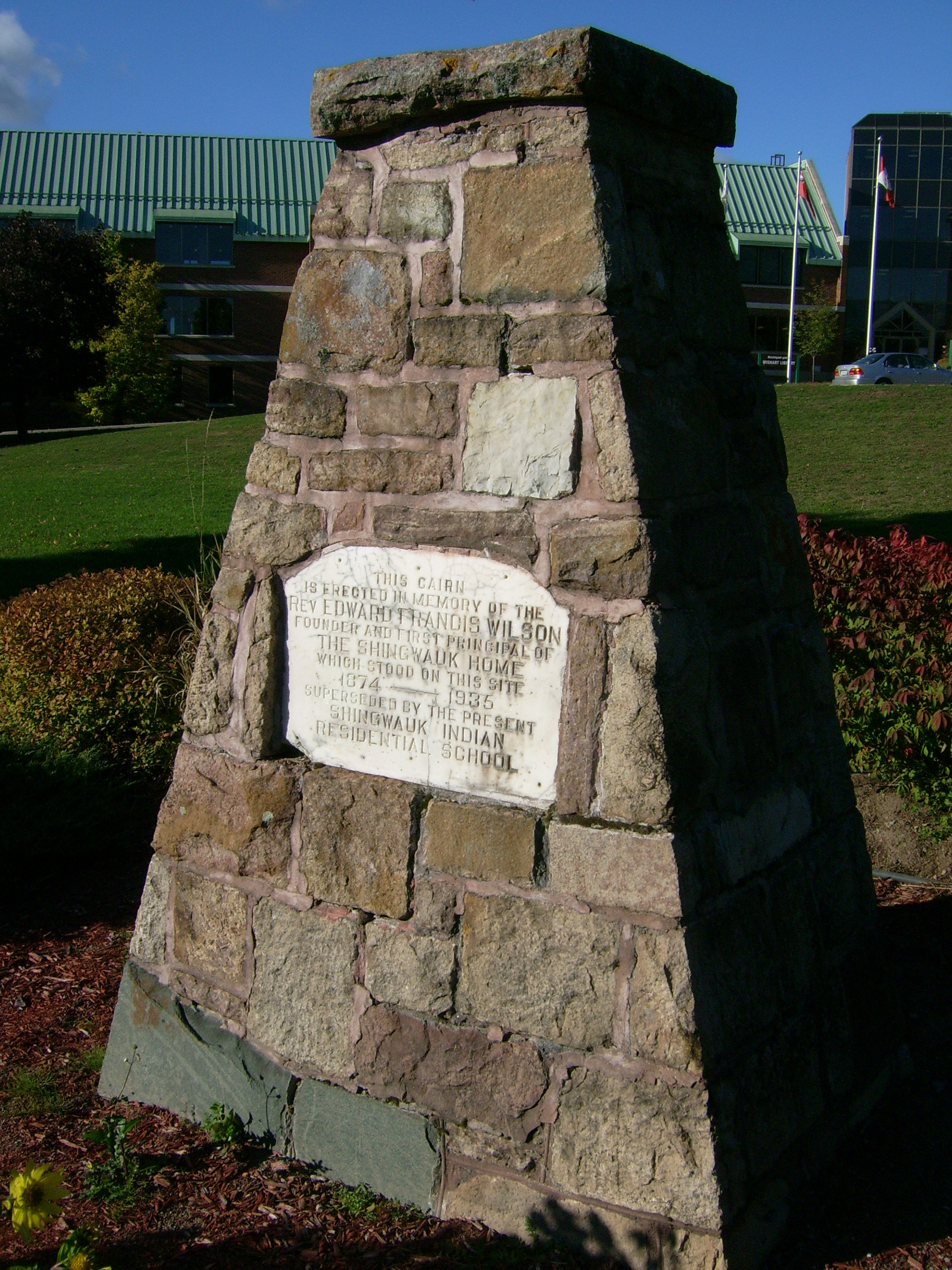
Memorial to School Founder

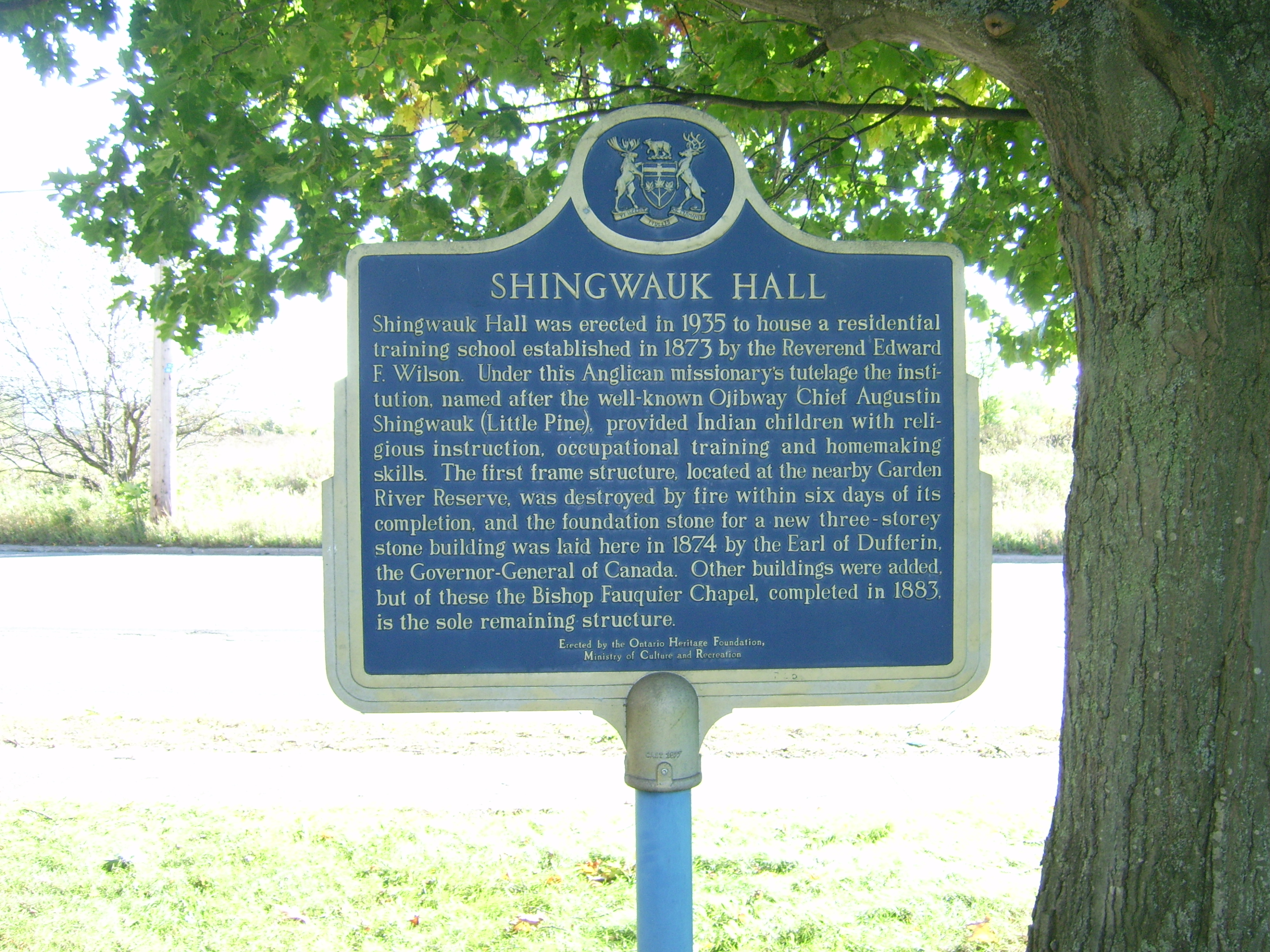
Memorial plaque at Shingwauk Hall

There are numerous memorials on the Shingwauk Indian Residential School Site, including:

- Cairn dedicated to the founder of the Shingwauk School, Rev. E.F. Wilson. This monument is current located on the front lawn of Algoma University and was constructed from stones from the original principal's residence that was on the site until 1935.
- Directly behind the Wilson Cairn is a monument put up by the Children of Shingwauk Alumni Association. This monument was erected in August 2012 and is in memory of all who attended residential school across Turtle Island with an emphasis on those who didn't return home. The commemorative plaque is surrounded by the seven grandfather teachings. This monument was constructed as part of larger the Truth and Reconciliation Commission of Canada community commemoration event program.
- The Shingwauk Memorial Cemetery cairn erected in 1988 by the Children of Shingwauk Alumni Association and the cemetery committee following the 1981 Shingwauk Reunion commemorates all who are buried in the cemetery.
- Also located in the Shingwauk Memorial Cemetery is a commemorative bench. The bench features the inscription "In Memory of Shingwauk Residential School. Students Remembering Students" and was placed in the cemetery in 2012.
- There is also an Ontario Heritage Foundation plaque commemorating the history of the Shingwauk site. This marker is situated outside the Bishop Fauquier Chapel, the only remaining structure from the early years of the Shingwauk School. This plaque was vandalized with red paint in 2021 and replaced with two new commemorative plaques on September 30, 2022 that included more accurate language describing residential schools.
- The Shingwauk Residential School site has also received two commemorative markers as part of the Assembly of First Nations commemorative marker project. These markers are for the Shingwauk Indian Residential School and the Wawanosh Indian Residential School. One of the markers is temporarily on display in the Shingwauk Residential Schools Centre. The permanent placement of the markers is still being decided.
- On August 3, 2018, the Reclaiming Shingwauk Hall commemorative exhibition was opened on the Shingwauk Site. This exhibition honors the experience of residential school survivors and also teaches the general public about this history of the site.
- In April 2021 the Shingwauk Residential School site was designated as a national historic site under the Historic Sites and Monument Board of Canada.
- In August 2023 the Children of Shingwauk Alumni Association, in partnership with the City of Sault Ste. Marie, unveiled the Every Child Matters Sacred Memorial in Snowdon Park. This memorial is dedicated to the children who drowned in the pond which was located behind the Shingwauk Residential School.

=== Wawanosh Memorials ===
- In 1967 the South Tarentorus Women’s Institute installed a sandstone monument dedicated to the Wawanosh Home. This monument was designated under municipal heritage legislation by the City of Sault Ste. Marie in June 2021.
- On September 30, 2024 a new memorial space recognizing the Wawanosh Home was unveiled. Created in partnership between the Children of Shingwauk Alumni Association, the Royal Canadian Legion Branch 25, and SalDan Developments Ltd., the memorial preserves the original 1967 Wawanosh monument, while adding seating and interpretive panels.

== See also ==
- List of Canadian residential schools
- Canadian Indian residential school system
