= Frank Nock =

Canadian Anglican bishop

Frank Foley Nock (February 27, 1916 - August 17, 1989) was a Canadian Anglican bishop in the 20th century.

Nock was born on 27 February 1916 in Toronto. He received his Bachelor of Arts in 1938, his Bachelor of Divinity in 1946, and his Doctor of Divinity in 1957 all from Trinity College, Toronto. He later earned his Doctor of Sacred Theology from Thorneloe University in Sudbury, Ontario in 1980.

He was ordained was a deacon in 1940 and as a priest in 1941. His first post was as an assistant Curate at St Matthew's, Toronto from 1940 to 1942. He later held incumbencies at, Christ Church, Sault Ste. Marie, Ontario (1942-1945), St Thomas, Bracebridge (1945-1948) and the Church of the Epiphany, Sudbury (1948-1957), and St. Luke's Cathedral (Sault Ste. Marie) (1957-1974) He also served as Dean of Algoma from 1957 to 1974.

From 1975 to 1983 he served as its diocesan bishop. His last post was as priest in charge of St John the Divine, Arva (until 1986). He died on 17 August 1989: and his wife in 2010.

== Personal life ==
Nock was involved in numerous community groups including: the Sault Ste Marie and District Group Health Association and the Community Concerts Association of Sudbury. He served as director for both groups. He also held the position of Chancellor at Thorneloe University and the position of secretary for the Canadian House of Bishops.

Religious titles
Preceded by William Lockridge Wright	Bishop of Algoma; 1974 – 1983	Succeeded by Leslie Ernest Peterson
