= William Wright (Canadian bishop) =

Canadian Anglican bishop

William Lockridge Wright (September 4, 1904 - January 19, 1990) was a Canadian Anglican bishop in the 20th century.

== Personal life and education ==
Wright was born into an ecclesiastical family on 8 September 1904 in Roslin, Ontario. He was educated at Queen's University, Kingston, Ontario and ordained in 1927. He married Margaret Clare on July 30, 1936, in the former Chapel of Trinity College, Toronto. Wright and his wife had four children and thirteen grandchildren.

== Early career ==
After a curacy at St George's, Toronto he was then the Incumbent at St James', Tweed from 1928 to 1932. His next appointment was as a curacy at Christ's Church Cathedral (Hamilton, Ontario). In 1936 he became rector at Church of St. George the Martyr, Toronto. He became rector of St. Luke's Cathedral (Sault Ste. Marie) in 1940 and 1941 he became Dean of St Luke's.

== Bishop and Metropolitan ==
On May 30, 1944, Wright was consecrated as Bishop of Algoma. At the time of his election as Bishop he was the youngest to ever be elected to the House of Bishops. In 1955 he also became Metropolitan of Ontario, posts he held until 1974.

While holding the position of Bishop of Algoma, Wright established the Archbishop Wright Extension Fund on January 16, 1957. This fund was designed to help purchase new sites for churches and rectories, and assistant in church extension projects across Algoma. The fund resulted in more than twenty churches and twenty rectories being built. The fund also provided capital funds for the building of Thorneloe University in Sudbury, Ontario. Wright went on to serve as the first Chancellor of Thoneloe University.

In 1970, following the retirement of Archbishop Howard Clark, Wright was temporarily made the Acting Primate of All Canada. He was also elected Chairman of the Anglican Council of North America and the Caribbean in 1970. Wright also served as co-chairman of the General Commission on Church Union in Canada.

He died on 19 January 1990.

Religious titles
Preceded by George Frederick Kingston	Bishop of Algoma; 1944 – 1974	Succeeded by Frank Foley Nock
Preceded by Robert John Renison	Metropolitan of Ontario; 1955 – 1974	Succeeded by James Augustus Watton
