= Edward Sullivan (bishop) =

Canadian Anglican bishop (1832–1899)

- Bishop of Algoma
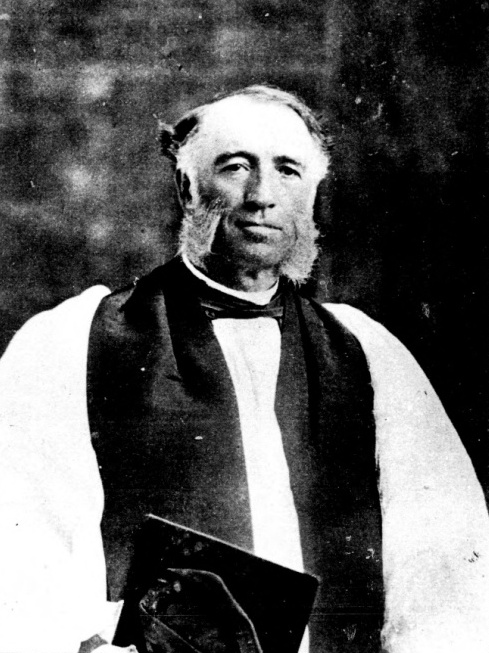
- Church: Anglican Church of Canada
- Diocese: Diocese of Algoma
- In office: 1882–1897
- Predecessor: Fredrick Dawson Fauquier
- Successor: George Thorneloe

Orders
- Ordination: 1859
- Consecration: 1882

Personal details
- Born: 18 August 1832 Lurgan, County Armagh, Northern Ireland
- Died: 6 January 1899 (aged 0) Toronto, Ontario
- Denomination: Anglicanism
- Spouse: Mary Hutchison, Frances Renaud

Edward Sullivan (18 August 1832 – 6 January 1899) was a Canadian Anglican priest.

Sullivan was the son of a Wesleyan minister and was born in Lurgan, County Armagh, Northern Ireland, in 1832. He attended grammar school at Clonmel in County Tipperary and went on to be educated at Trinity College, Dublin.

He emigrated to Upper Canada in 1858 at which point he was ordered to the diaconate by Diocese of Huron Bishop Benjamin Cronyn. He was ordained as a priest in 1859. He married Mary Hutchison, a family friend from Ireland. Following Hutchison's death he remarried Frances Renaud, who he had five children with.

== Incumbencies ==
His first appointment was a curate near, London, Ontario, in 1859. In 1863 he was appointed to St. George's Church in Montreal. In 1868 he left Montreal to become the rector of Holy Trinity, Chicago from 1868 to 1879. Sullivan was at Holy Trinity during the Great Chicago Fire of 1871, during which the church burned to the ground. Sullivan and his congregation raised funds to rebuild Holy Trinity in mere months. In 1879 Sullivan returned to Canada and of St George, Montreal as rector.

== Bishop of Algoma ==
Following the death of Fredrick Dawson Fauquier, the Diocese of Algoma's first bishop in 1882, Sullivan was elected in May 1882 to the episcopate as the second bishop of Algoma. At age 49 he was consecrated as bishop at St. George's Church, Montreal on June 29, 1882. When Sullivan took charge of the Algoma Diocese the diocese was still very much a missionary diocese that spanned a huge physical area and was under considerable financial strain. Sullivan was responsible for the expansion of the Diocese Mission Fund and proactively seeking support from the Missionary Society of England which resulted in many churches in the diocese becoming debt free. He also started a Widows' and Orphans' Fund to help financially with the dependents of deceased clergy. In 1896 this fund had reached $18,000. The fund was later renamed as the Bishop Sullivan Memorial Sustentation Fund. By the 1970, the fund has reached a value of $168,000.

Sullivan was also responsible for the division of the Algoma Diocese into rural Deaneries. He initially appointed priests with regional oversight to four deaneries: Muskoka, Parry Sound, Algoma, and Thunder Bay. In 1895 Nipissing and Manitoulin were added as deaneries.

Sullivan's health began to decline in 1893 and he began spending winters in France to recover. He resigned as bishop in 1896 and became the rector of St James Cathedral, Toronto, until his death in June 1899.

Religious titles
| Preceded by Fredrick Dawson Fauqier | Bishop of Algoma; 1882 – 1897 | Succeeded by George Thorneloe |
