= Diocese of Algoma =

Diocese of the Anglican Church in Canada

Coordinates: 46.5105°N 84.3267°W

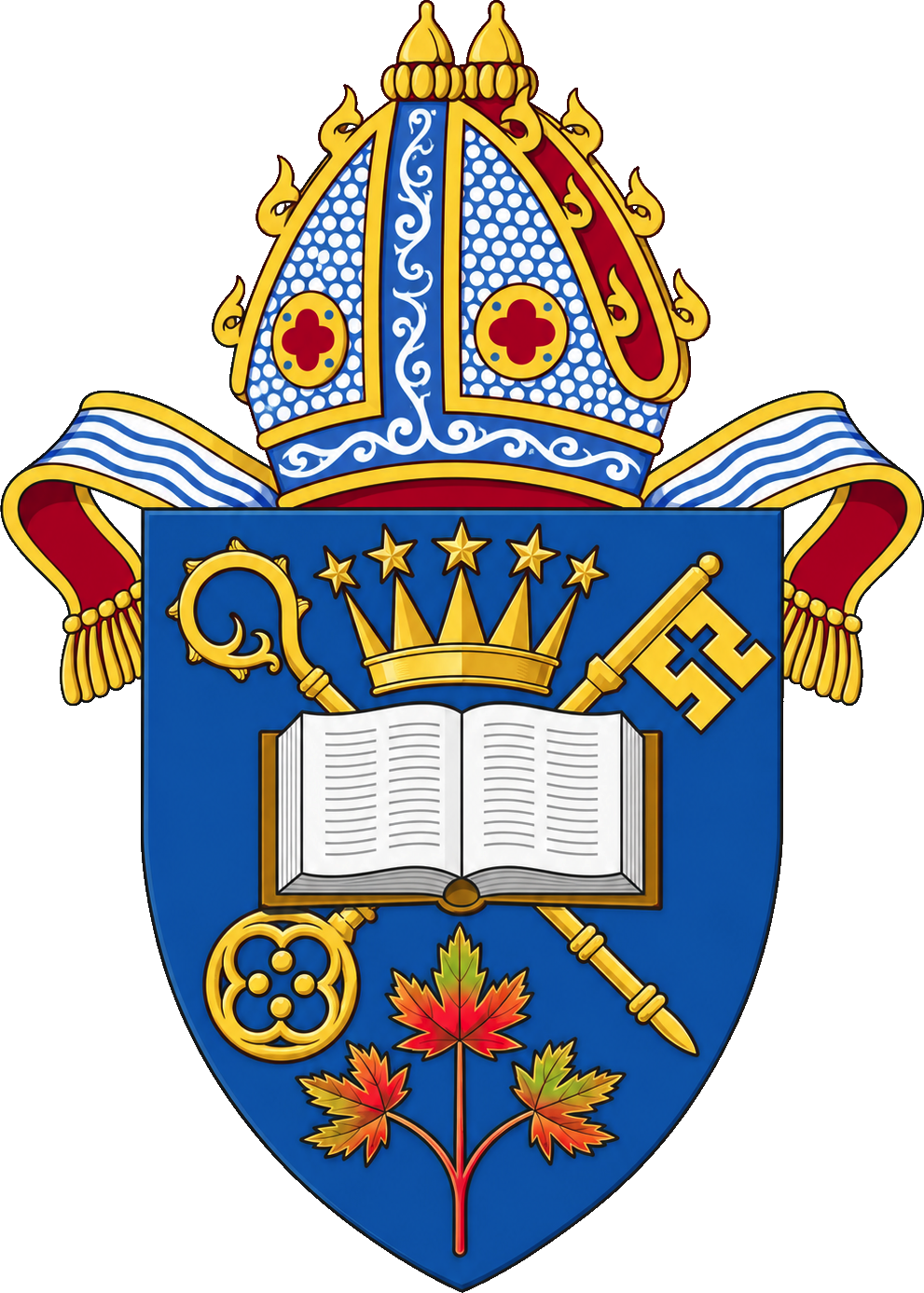

Location
- Country: Canada
- Ecclesiastical province: Ontario
- Archdeaconries: 5

Statistics
- Parishes: 52 (2022)
- Members: 5,053 (2022)

Information
- Denomination: Anglican Church of Canada
- Rite: Anglican
- Cathedral: St. Luke's Cathedral, Sault Ste. Marie

Current leadership
- Bishop: Anne Germond

Map
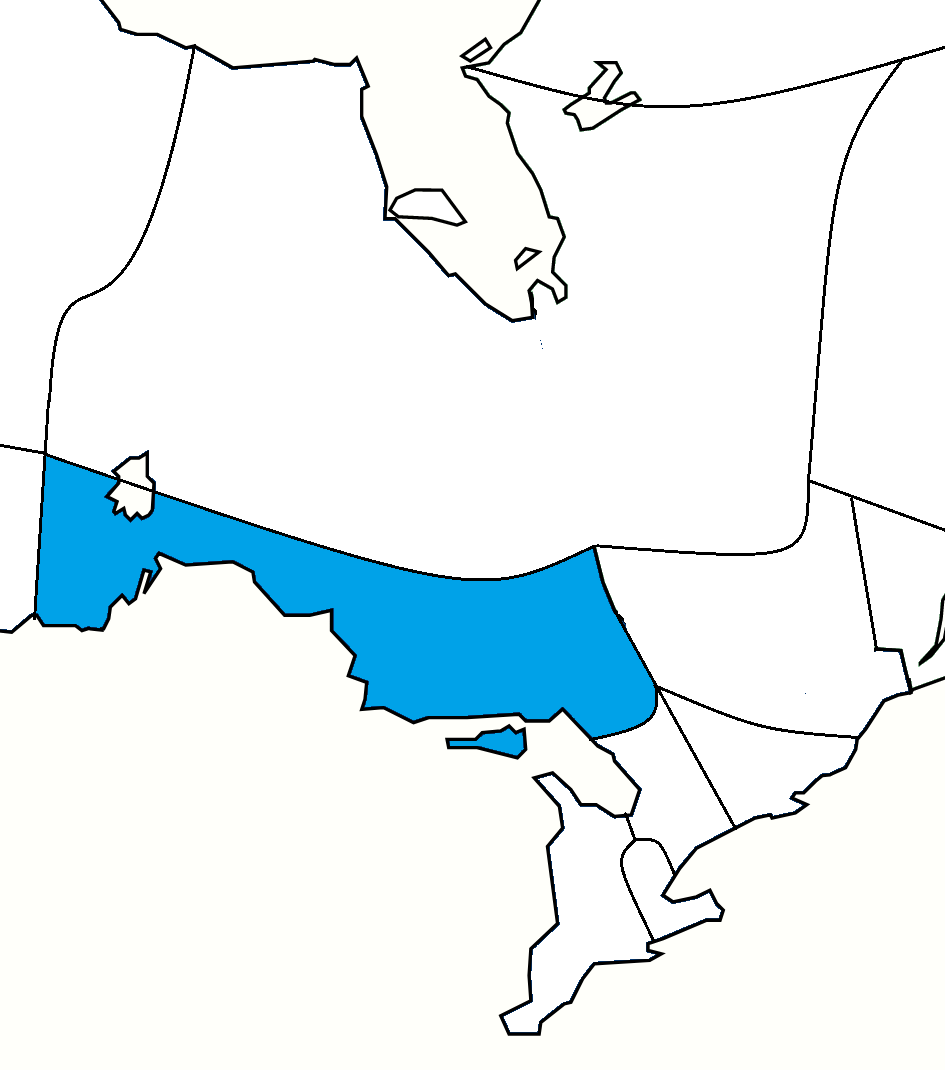
- The boundaries of the diocese within the Ecclesiastical Province of Ontario.

Website
- dioceseofalgoma.com

The Diocese of Algoma is a diocese of the Ecclesiastical Province of Ontario of the Anglican Church of Canada. It comprises nearly 182,000 square kilometres of the Ontario districts of Algoma (from which it takes its name), Thunder Bay, Sudbury, Manitoulin, and parts of the districts of Nipissing and Timiskaming. The diocese forms a wide band stretching from just west of Thunder Bay on the northern shore of Lake Superior east to the border of Ontario and Quebec. Neighbouring Anglican dioceses are Rupert's Land to the west, Moosonee to the north, Ottawa to the east, and Ontario, Toronto, Huron to the south.

== History ==
The Diocese of Algoma, founded in 1873, was one of four carved off from the original Diocese of Toronto. Consisting of a large First Nations population, the primary focus of the new diocese was intended to be missionary activity combined with ministry to the growing European settlements in the Muskoka and Parry Sound areas around Lake Huron. By the turn of the twentieth century, the demographics of the territory had shifted considerably, as mining and forestry attracted more European settlement. By 1906, Algoma ceased to be a missionary diocese of the ecclesiastical province and held its first independent synod.

The mission of the diocese is "To share in the gathering work of Christ so that His newness of life overflows into our hearts, homes, churches, and community."

== Bishops of Algoma ==
No.	Image	Name	Dates	Notes
1		Frederick Fauquier	1873–1881	
2		Edward Sullivan	1882–1896	
3		George Thorneloe	1896–1926	Metropolitan of Ontario, 1915–1926
4		Rocksborough Smith	1927–1939	
5		Frederick Kingston	1939–1944	
6		William Wright	1944–1974	Metropolitan of Ontario, 1955–1974
7		Frank Nock	1974–1982	
8		Leslie Peterson	1982–1994	
9		Ronald Ferris	1995–2008	
10		Stephen Andrews	2009–2016	
11		Anne Germond	2016–present	Metropolitan of Ontario, 2018–present

== Organization of the modern diocese ==
Algoma's See city is Sault Ste. Marie, and its Anglican population of 18,000 on the parish rolls is served by 50 parishes. The current bishop of Algoma is Anne Germond. The title of Dean and incumbent of St. Luke's Cathedral is currently vacant following the death of Dean Jay Koyle. Apart from Sault Ste. Marie, other major centres in the diocese include North Bay, Sudbury, and Thunder Bay. Nineteen of the diocese's fifty parishes are located in these communities. Most of the rest of the parishes are located in small towns and First Nations communities. The Diocese of Algoma is currently divided into five deaneries including: Algoma, Muskoka, Sudbury-Manitoulin, Temiskaming, and Thunder Bay-North Shore.

The diocese operates three camping ministries: Camp Gitchigomee located on Sandstone Lake near Thunder Bay; Camp Temiskaming on Fairy Lake, near New Liskeard; and Camp Manitou near Whitefish Falls.

The diocese maintains active chaplaincies at Thorneloe University located in Sudbury and the Mission to Seafarers, located in Thunder Bay. The archival collection of the Anglican Diocese of Algoma is held at Algoma University in the Engracia de Jesus Matias Archives and Special Collections.

The dean of Algoma is also rector of St Luke's Cathedral, Sault Ste. Marie.

- 1935–1940: Percy Alfred Paris
- 1941–1944: William Lockridge Wright (Bishop of Algoma, 1944)
- 1944–1951: James Hannington Craig
- 1951–1957: Walter Bruce Jennings
- 1957–1974: Frank Foley Nock (Bishop of Algoma, 1974)
- 1975–1992: I. Lawrence Robertson
- 1993–2001: Allan R. Reed (7th dean; Dean of Kootenay, 2001)
- 2001–2007: Garry Dobinson
- 2007–2010: Nelson Small
- 2011–2024: James McShane
- 2024–2026: Jay Koyle

== Diocesan newspapers ==
The first diocesan newspaper was established in the Algoma region in 1874 by the Rev. Edward Francis Wilson, the first principal of the Shingwauk Indian Residential School. This newspaper was first known as the Algoma Missionary News and was published out of the Shingwauk School. In 1978 an Ojibway-language supplement to the Algoma Missionary News was published under the name The Peace Pipe with the tag line "an Ojibway newspaper published monthly at the Shingwauk Home".

Over the years the name of this paper changed a number of times and was known successively as Algoma Quarterly, The Algoma Missionary News and Shingwauk Journal, and finally Algoma Missionary News. Publication of the Algoma Missionary News ceased in 1956.

In 1957, the newspaper was replaced by the Algoma Anglican, which is still in publication today. The publisher of the Algoma Anglican is always the current bishop of Algoma, with the editor being assigned by the bishop. The newspaper has a mandate to share with the Algoma Anglican community about ongoing diocesan issues, news, and events. The paper also includes updates about the numerous parishes within the Anglican Diocese of Algoma.

Editors of the numerous iterations of the newspaper have included:

Editor name	Dates	Publication
Rev. E. F. Wilson	1874-1889	Algoma Missionary News
G. H. Gaviller	1889-1892	Algoma Missionary News
Charles Piercey	1892-1918	Algoma Missionary News
F.W. Colloton	1918-1944	Algoma Missionary News
Frank F. Nock	1944-1956	Algoma Missionary News
Rev. J.E. Jordan	1957	Algoma Anglican
Rev David Mitchell Rector of bracebridge 1960’s		
Rev. Peter Simmons	Present	Algoma Anglican
