= Ragg =

Ragg is a surname. Notable people with the surname include:

- Amie Ragg (1878–1957), Fijian engineer, civil servant and politician
- David Ragg (1919–2002), Canadian Anglican bishop
- Edward Ragg (born 1976), British poet, critic and writer on wine
- Harry Ragg (1889–1967), Canadian Anglican bishop
- Hugh Ragg (1882–1963), Fijian businessman and politician
- Kathlyn Ragg (born 1962), Fijian cyclist
- Lonsdale Ragg (1866–1945), British Anglican priest and author

== See also ==
- The Ragg, a village in County Tipperary, Ireland
