= Thorneloe =

Thorneloe is a surname. Notable people with the surname include:

- Rupert Thorneloe (1969–2009), British Army officer
- George Thorneloe (1848–1935), Canadian bishop
  - Thorneloe University, named for him

== See also ==
- Thornloe
