= Leslie Peterson =

Leslie Peterson may refer to:

- Leslie Peterson (politician) (1923–2015), Canadian politician
- Leslie Esdaile Banks (Leslie Ann Peterson, 1959–2011), American writer
- Leslie Peterson (bishop) (1928–2003), Canadian bishop

== See also ==
- Leslie Petersen, American politician, former Democratic candidate for governor of Wyoming
