= St. Paul's Cathedral (London, Ontario) =

Coordinates: 42°59′09″N 81°14′59″W

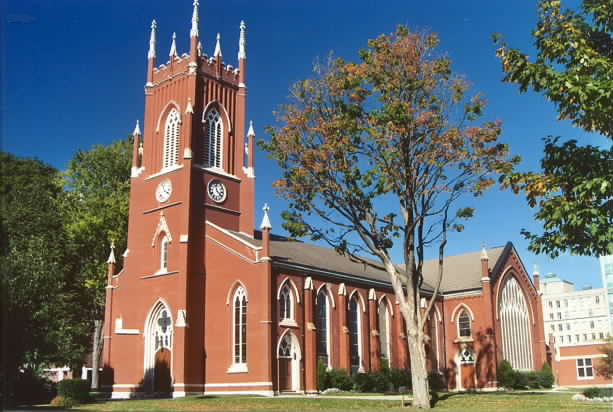
- St. Paul's Cathedral in London, Ontario
- St. Paul's Cathedral
- Location: 472 Richmond Street; London, Ontario; N6A 3E6
- Denomination: Anglican Church of Canada
- Website: stpaulscathedral.on.ca

Administration
- Province: Ontario
- Diocese: Huron

Clergy
- Dean: Kevin George

St. Paul's Cathedral in London, Ontario, Canada, is the seat of the Diocese of Huron of the Anglican Church of Canada. It was designed in the Gothic Revival style by William Thomas and built between 1844 and 1846, replacing the previous church, which was built in 1834 and burned down in 1844. It is the oldest church in the city. Sculptors John Cochrane and Brothers undertook the work on the cathedral's interior.

In 1966, the cathedral commissioned its history to be written by the Rev. Orlo Miller.

== Deans of Huron ==
The dean of Huron is normally also the rector of St Pauls.

- 1866–1871: Isaac Hellmuth, the first dean and afterwards bishop of Huron and founder of Western University of London, Ontario
- 1871–1888: Michael Boomer
- 1888–1903: George Mignon Innes
- 1903–1918: Evans Davis
- 1918–1934: L. Norman Tucker
- 1935–1940: Charles E. Jeakins
- 1940–1944: P. N.Harding
- 1944–1948: George Luxton (afterwards Bishop of Huron, 1948)
- 1948–1961: R. C.Brown
- 1961–1980: Kenneth B. Keefe
- 1980–1987: Percy O'Driscoll (afterwards Bishop of Huron, 1987)
- 1988–2000: Bruce H. W. Howe (afterwards Bishop of Huron, 2000)
- 2000–2009: Terry Dance (afterwards Suffragan Bishop of Huron, 2009)
- 2010–2015 Kevin Dixon
- 2015–2016: Interim Dean Barry Clarke, retired Bishop of Montreal
- 2016–2022: Paul Millward
- 2022–2023: Interim Dean Robert Bennett, former Bishop of Huron
- 2024–: Kevin George

== See also ==
- St Paul's Cathedral, London, England
