= Frederick Kingston =

Canadian Anglican bishop

George Frederick Kingston (1889 – 20 November 1950) was a Canadian Anglican bishop in the 20th century.

== Education and first bishopric ==
Kingston was born in Prescott, Ontario to Richard and Elizabeth Kingston. He was one of ten children. Before attending post-secondary education Kingston taught at a one-room school in eastern Ontario. He was educated at Trinity College, Toronto earning his Bachelor of Arts in 1913, followed by his Master of Arts degree. He obtained his Bachelor of Divinity at University of King's College in Halifax, Nova Scotia and was ordained as a Deacon in 1916 in St. Thomas' Church Belleville, Ontario. In 1917 he was ordained as a priest at All Saints' Church, Halifax.

He was Professor of Philosophy at King's College, Nova Scotia and then Dean of Residence at Trinity College until April 25, 1940 when he was consecrated to the episcopate as the fifth Bishop of Algoma. A stained glass window in St. Luke's Pro-Cathedral in Sault Ste. Marie, Ontario was installed as a memorial to Kingston's work in the Diocese of Algoma.

== Archbishop and Primate ==
Kingston was translated to Nova Scotia and Prince Edward Island as bishop in 1944. He subsequently became both Metropolitan (Archbishop of Nova Scotia) and the Primate of the Anglican Church of Canada in 1947. He died in post on 20 November 1950. Following his death a memorial stained glass window was commissioned for St. Luke's Cathedral (Sault Ste. Marie) in memory of his service to the Algoma Diocese.

== Personal life ==
Kingston married Florence Belle Brown in 1919 and went on to have three children with her. Their one son, Temple Kingston went on to be the Principal of Canterbury College (Windsor, Ontario).

He was an active Freemason, in Craft Freemasonry, Royal Arch Freemasonry, and the Red Cross of Constantine, and served as Grand Chaplain of the Grand Lodge of Canada (Ontario) and Nova Scotia, from 1948 until his death in 1950.

Anglican Communion titles
Preceded by Rocksborough Remington Smith	Bishop of Algoma; 1940 – 1944	Succeeded by William Lockridge Wright
Preceded by John Hackenley	Bishop of Nova Scotia; 1944 – 1950	Succeeded by Robert Harold Waterman
Preceded by Derwyn Trevor Owen	Primate of the Anglican Church of Canada; 1947 – 1950	Succeeded by Walter Barfoot
