= Leslie Peterson (bishop) =

Canadian Anglican bishop (1928–2002)

Leslie Ernest Peterson (November 4, 1928 – July 25, 2002) was a Canadian Anglican bishop in the 20th century.

== Education ==
Peterson was born on 4 November 1928 in Rouyn-Noranda, Quebec. He received at Bachelor of Arts degree in 1952 from the University of Western Ontario and in 1952 he earned a Licentiate in theology from Huron University College. He later went on to earn a Doctor of Sacred Theology from Thorneloe University in Sudbury, Ontario. He was ordained as a Deacon in 1954 and as a priest 1955.

== Incumbencies ==
Between 1955 and 1983 he held numerous incumbencies including:

- All Saints’ Coniston, Ontario
- St Peter's Elliot Lake
- Christ Church North Bay
- Trinity Church Parry Sound.

== Bishop ==
In 1983 he became the coadjutor bishop and then the diocesan Bishop of Algoma. He resigned his see in 1994 and moved to London, Ontario for his retirement. He died on 25 July 2002.

Religious titles
Preceded by Frank Nock	Bishop of Algoma; 1983 – 1994	Succeeded by Ronald Ferris
