= Maurice Baldwin =

Canadian Anglican bishop (1836–1904)

Maurice Scollard Baldwin
- Bishop of Huron
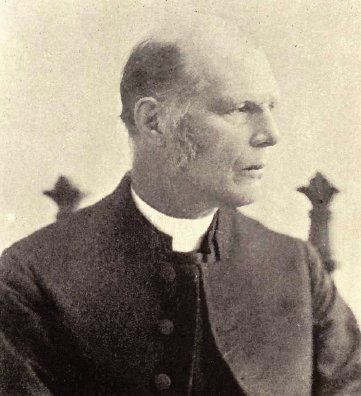
- Church: Anglican
- Diocese: Huron
- Installed: 1883
- Term ended: 1904
- Predecessor: Isaac Hellmuth
- Successor: David Williams

Personal details
- Born: 21 June 1836 Toronto, Upper Canada
- Died: 19 October 1904 (aged 68) London, Ontario, Canada
- Education: Trinity College, Toronto

Maurice Scollard Baldwin (21 June 1836 – 19 October 1904) was a Canadian Anglican Bishop.

== Biography ==
Born 21 June 1836, in Toronto, Baldwin was the son of John Spread Baldwin of Toronto. His parents were from influential families; he was the grandson of Æneas Shaw and the cousin of Robert Baldwin. He attended Upper Canada College and Trinity College, Toronto.

He was ordained a Deacon in 1860 and Priest in 1861. In 1865, he moved to Montreal as Incumbent of St. Luke's Church and in 1870 became assistant Rector of Christ Church Anglican Cathedral in Montreal and a Canon in 1871. Following the death of John Bethune in 1871, he was appointed to succeed him as Rector, and in 1879 made Dean of Montreal.

Noted for his evangelism and skillful oratory, he was elected the third Bishop of Huron in 1883, succeeding Isaac Hellmuth. He was less passionate about administrative matters than spiritual ones, but delegated such matters effectively. Under his leadership, the diocese adopted parliamentary rules for its synod, balanced its budget, and first broke off, then restored, its association with Western University of London, Ontario.
