= Todd Townshend =

Canadian Anglican bishop (born 1967)

The Right Reverend Todd Townshend
- 14th Bishop of Huron
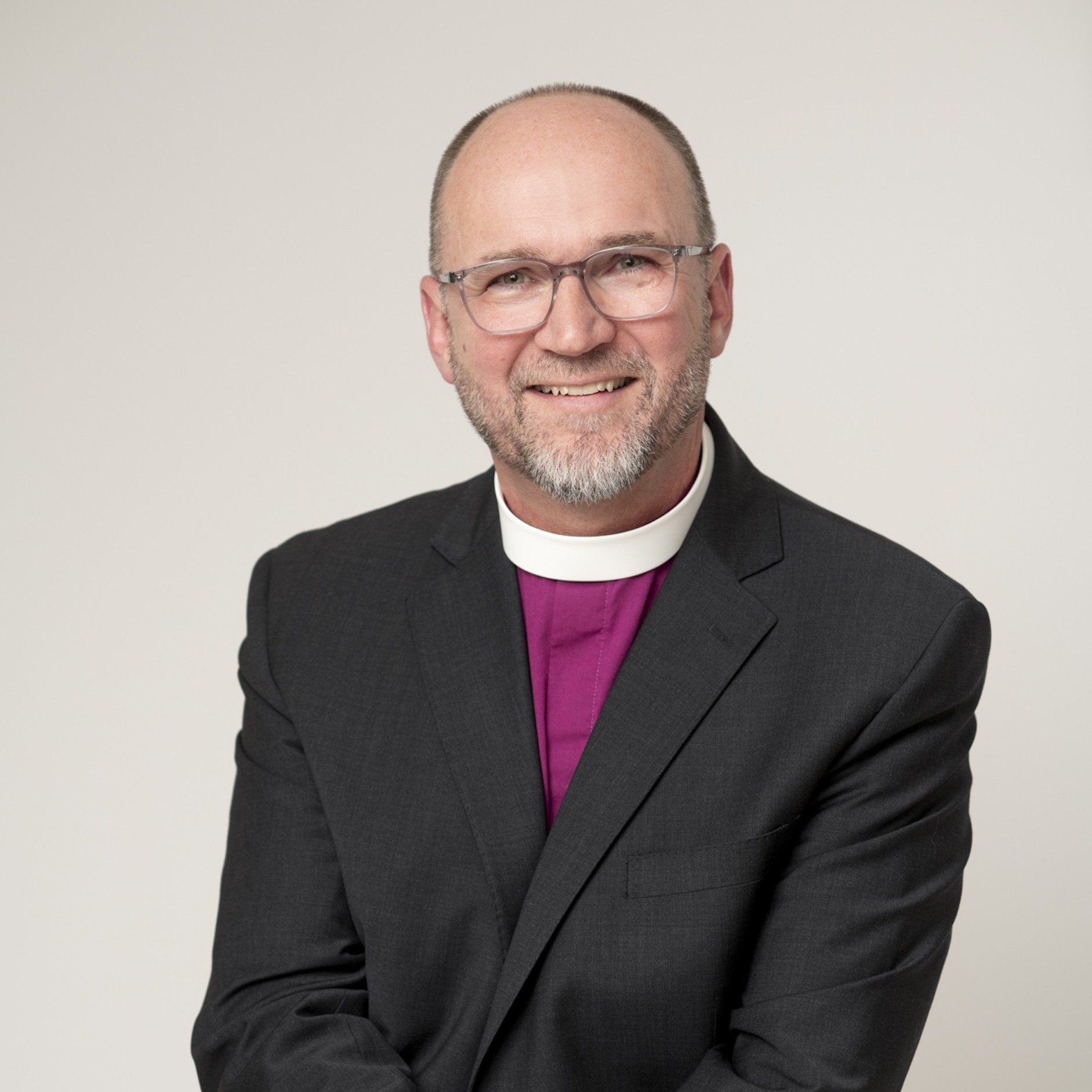
- Church: Anglican Church of Canada
- Province: Ecclesiastical Province of Ontario
- Diocese: Huron
- Elected: October 26, 2019
- In office: 2020–Present
- Predecessor: The Most Rev. Linda Nicholls

Orders
- Ordination: 1992 (deacon); 1992 (priest)
- Consecration: January 25, 2020 by The Most Rev. Anne Germond

Personal details
- Born: Robert Todd Townshend; August 19, 1967 (age 58)
- Denomination: Anglican
- Spouse: Stacey Townshend
- Children: 3
- Education: University of Waterloo; Huron University College; Wycliffe College, Toronto; University of Toronto

Todd Townshend (born August 19, 1967) is the 14th Bishop of The Diocese of Huron in the Anglican Church of Canada. He was Ordained to the diaconate May 14, 1992, ordained to the priesthood on November 30, 1992, and Consecrated a Bishop and Installed as the 14th Bishop of Huron at St. Paul's Cathedral, London, Ontario on Saturday January 25, 2020.

Townshend received a BSc from the University of Waterloo in 1989, an MDiv with honours from Huron University College in 1992, and a ThD from the University of Toronto and Wycliffe College in 2007. His dissertation is titled "The Sacramentality of Preaching".

Townshend has served in several London parishes. Townshend also served as the Dean of the Faculty of Theology at Huron University College between 2013 and 2019. Prior to assuming his role as Dean of the Faculty, Townshend taught at Huron University College since 2002 in a variety of roles including Professor of Homiletics and Pastoral Theology and Associate Professor of Contextual Theology.

Townshend chairs various diocesan committees and has chaired or continues to serve on various national committees of the Anglican Church of Canada.

== Personal life ==
Townshend's grandfather (William) and father (Robert) also served as bishops in the Diocese of Huron.

Townshend is married to Stacey, and they have three children.

== Published works ==
Townshend academic work includes the aforementioned book, The Sacramentality of Preaching, as well as contributions to multi-author works:

- Townshend, Todd (2009). The sacramentality of preaching : homiletical uses of Louis-Marie Chauvet's theology of sacramentality. New York: Peter Lang. ISBN 9781433105166.
- "What Can Death Teach Us About Preaching?", Liturgy Journal Volume 33, 2018 - Issue 1: Death and the Liturgy.
- "Lectionary Homiletics", Four entries: Advent II to Christmas I, December 2014.

Anglican Communion titles
Preceded by Linda Nicholls	Bishop of Huron; 2020–	Succeeded by Incumbent
