= George Thorneloe =

Canadian Anglican bishop

- Bishop of Algoma, Metropolitan of Ontario, Archbishop of Algoma
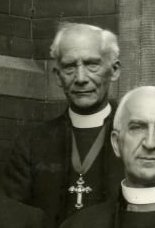
- The Right Reverend George Thorneloe in c.1924
- Church: Anglican Church of Canada
- Metropolis: Ontario
- Diocese: Diocese of Algoma
- In office: 1897–1927
- Predecessor: Edward Sullivan
- Successor: Rocksborough Smith

Orders
- Ordination: 1875 by Bishop Williams

Personal details
- Born: October 4, 1848 Coventry, England
- Died: August 3, 1935 (aged 86) Sault Ste. Marie, Ontario
- Buried: Malvern Cemetery, Lennoxville, Quebec
- Denomination: Anglicanism
- Spouse: Mary Fuller
- Children: Walter Thorneloe, Katharine Isobel Louise Thorneloe

George Thorneloe (4 October 1848 – 3 August 1935) was a Canadian Anglican bishop at the end of the 19th century and the beginning of the 20th.

== Biography ==
Thorneloe was born in Coventry, England on October 4, 1848. He emigrated to Canada alongside his parents in 1858. His father was a Wesleyan Methodist minister, who was later ordained in the Anglican Church. In 1875 Thorneloe married Mary Fuller, whom he had two children with.

Thorneloe was educated at Bishop's College, Lennoxville where he graduated with a First Class in Classics and won the Prince of Wales Medal. He was ordained in 1874 by Bishop Williams. He was a missionary at Stanstead in Quebec Province until 1885 when he became Rector of St Peter's Sherbrooke. While at St. Peter's Thorneloe was made a canon of the Cathedral of the Holy Trinity, Quebec City. He was almost elected as Bishop of Quebec and Bishop of the Diocese of New Westminster, British Columbia.

In 1896 he was elected as the third Bishop of Algoma. He was consecrated as Bishop on January 6, 1897, in the Cathedral of the Holy Trinity, Quebec City by Bishop Bond of Montreal. In 1915 he also became Metropolitan of Ontario and Archbishop of Algoma. Thorneloe held is positions as Bishop and Metropolitan until he resigned in 1927 due to ill health.

Thorneloe died on 3 August 1935. A memorial service was held for him at St. Luke's Anglican Pro-Cathedral in Sault Ste. Marie, Ontario. He was buried in Malvern Cemetery, Lennoxville, Quebec. A limestone baptismal font in the bapitistry of St. Luke's Cathedral memorializes the work of Thorneloe.

== Awards and honors ==
Thorneloe's work was recognized in numerous ways including:

- Bishop's University bestowed an honorary Doctorate of Divinity degree on him in 1896.
- Trinity College, Toronto honored Thorneloe with a Degree honoris causa in 1898.
- In 1920 he received a second honorary Doctor of Divinity degree from the University of Oxford
- Thorneloe University an affiliated college at Laurentian University in Greater Sudbury is named after him.
- A village in rural Ontario is named after him.

Religious titles
Preceded by Edward Sullivan	Bishop of Algoma; 1897–1927	Succeeded by Rocksborough Smith
Preceded by Charles Hamilton	Metropolitan of Ontario; 1915–1927	Succeeded by David Williams
