= Carmen Queen =

Canadian Anglican bishop

Carmen John Queen (10 August 1912 – 23 February 1974) was Anglican Bishop of Huron in Canada in the third quarter of the 20th century.

Educated at the University of Western Ontario, Queen was ordained in 1925. After curacies at London, Ontario and Burford he became Rector of Princeton in 1938. After further incumbencies at Ridgetown, Tillsonburg and Ingersoll he became Domestic Chaplain to the Bishop of Huron. Further promotions (to be the Archdeacon then Suffragan Bishop of Huron) followed before he became its Diocesan in 1970. He died in post on 23 February 1974.

== Notes ==
Religious titles
Preceded by George Nasmith Luxton	Bishop of Huron; 1970 – 1974	Succeeded by Theodore David Butler Ragg
