= Ron Ferris =

Canadian Anglican bishop

The Right Reverend Ron Ferris
- Assisting Bishop of the Anglican Diocese of Canada
- Church: Anglican Church in North America
- Diocese: Canada
- Other posts: Bishop of Algoma; Bishop of Yukon

Orders
- Ordination: 1970
- Consecration: 1981

Personal details
- Born: 2 July 1945 (age 81)

Ronald Curry Ferris (born 2 July 1945) is a Canadian Anglican bishop. A former bishop of the Anglican Church of Canada, he now serves as an assistant bishop of the Anglican Diocese of Canada. He is married to Jan, has six adult children and several grandchildren, and lives in Langley, British Columbia.

Ferris was educated at The University of Western Ontario He was ordained an Anglican priest in 1970. He has doctorates in sacred theology, ministry and theology. He had incumbencies at St Luke's Church, Old Crow, Yukon, and St Stephen's Memorial Church, London, Ontario. In 1981 he became the Bishop of Yukon. He was translated to be the Bishop of Algoma in 1995 and resigned that see in September 2008.

A theological conservative, he was candidate at the election for Primate of the Anglican Church of Canada in 2004. He disapproved of the pro-homosexuality policies taken by some dioceses of the Anglican Church of Canada and decided to leave. He was received as a bishop of the Anglican Church of the Southern Cone of America in January 2009 by Archbishop Gregory Venables. Ferris became an assisting bishop for the Anglican Network in Canada, a founding diocese of the Anglican Church in North America, in June 2009. Ferris' main focus is church planting in the Lower Mainland of British Columbia, while he also assists the moderator bishop. He became the vicar of a newly founded parish in Langley, the Church of Ascension.

Religious titles
| Preceded by John Timothy Frame | Bishop of Yukon; 1981 – 1995 | Succeeded by Terrence Owen Buckle |
| Preceded by Leslie Ernest Peterson | Bishop of Algoma; 1995 – 2008 | Succeeded by Stephen Andrews |
