= Terry Dance =

The Right Reverend Terry Dance
- Suffragan Bishop of Huron
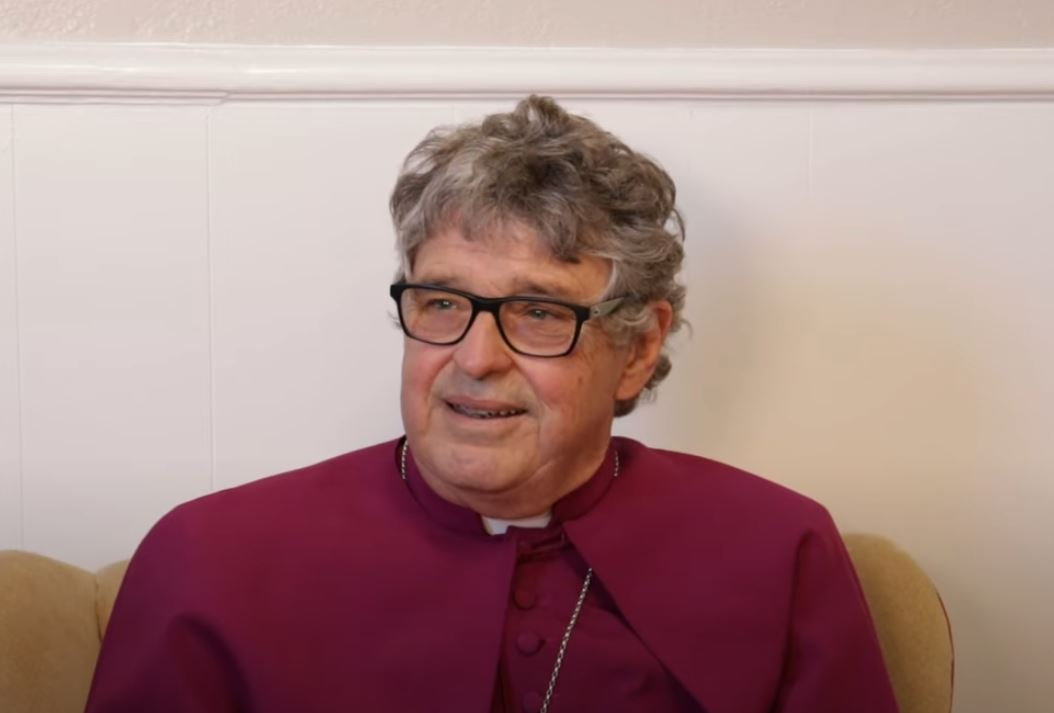
- Church: Anglican Church of Canada
- Province: Province of Ontario
- Diocese: Huron
- In office: 2009–2015
- Other post: Dean of Huron

Orders
- Ordination: 1977 (priesthood)
- Consecration: 2009

Personal details
- Born: Terrance Arthur Dance; 1952 (age 73–74)
- Denomination: Anglican
- Education: University of Western Ontario

Terrance Arthur (Terry) Dance was a suffragan bishop in the Anglican Diocese of Huron, Ontario, Canada, where he was in charge of the Norfolk area of the diocese from 2009 until his retirement from active ministry 31 December 2015.

Dance was born in 1952, educated at the University of Western Ontario and ordained in 1977. After a curacy at St John the Evangelist, London, Ontario he served parishes in Chesley, Tara, Windsor and Simcoe. He was also regional dean of Norfolk, archdeacon of Brant and dean of Huron.
