= George Luxton =

Canadian Anglican bishop

George Nasmith Luxton (August 13, 1901 – October 2, 1970) was the Anglican bishop of Huron in Canada in the mid-20th century.

Educated at the University of Toronto, he was ordained in 1925. He was a curate at Christ's Church Cathedral, Hamilton then rector at Christ Church, Calgary. After further incumbencies at St Catharines, Ontario and Grace Church on-the-Hill, Toronto he became Dean of Huron in 1943 and its bishop in 1948.

== Notes ==
Religious titles
Preceded by Charles Allen Seager	Bishop of Huron; 1948 – 1970	Succeeded by Carman John Queen
