= Frederick Fauquier =

Canadian Anglican priest

Frederick Dawson Fauquier
- Bishop of Algoma
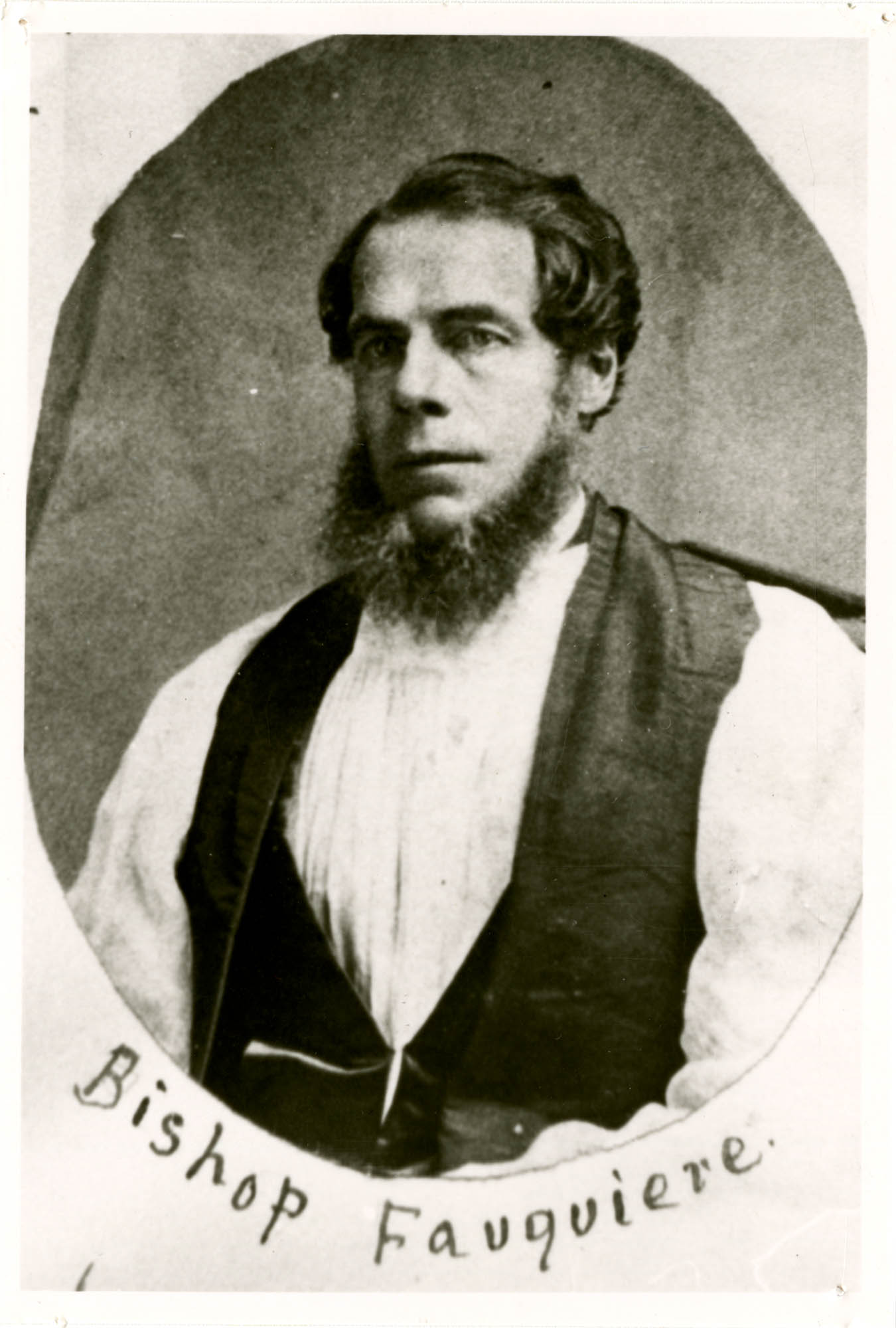
- Church: Anglican Church of Canada
- Diocese: Diocese of Algoma
- In office: 1873–1881
- Successor: Edward Sullivan

Orders
- Ordination: by Bishop Strachan
- Consecration: 1873

Personal details
- Born: July 29, 1817 Malta
- Died: December 7, 1881 (aged 64) Sault Ste. Marie, Ontario
- Buried: Shingwauk Memorial Cemetery
- Denomination: Anglicanism
- Spouse: Sarah Eliza Burrowes

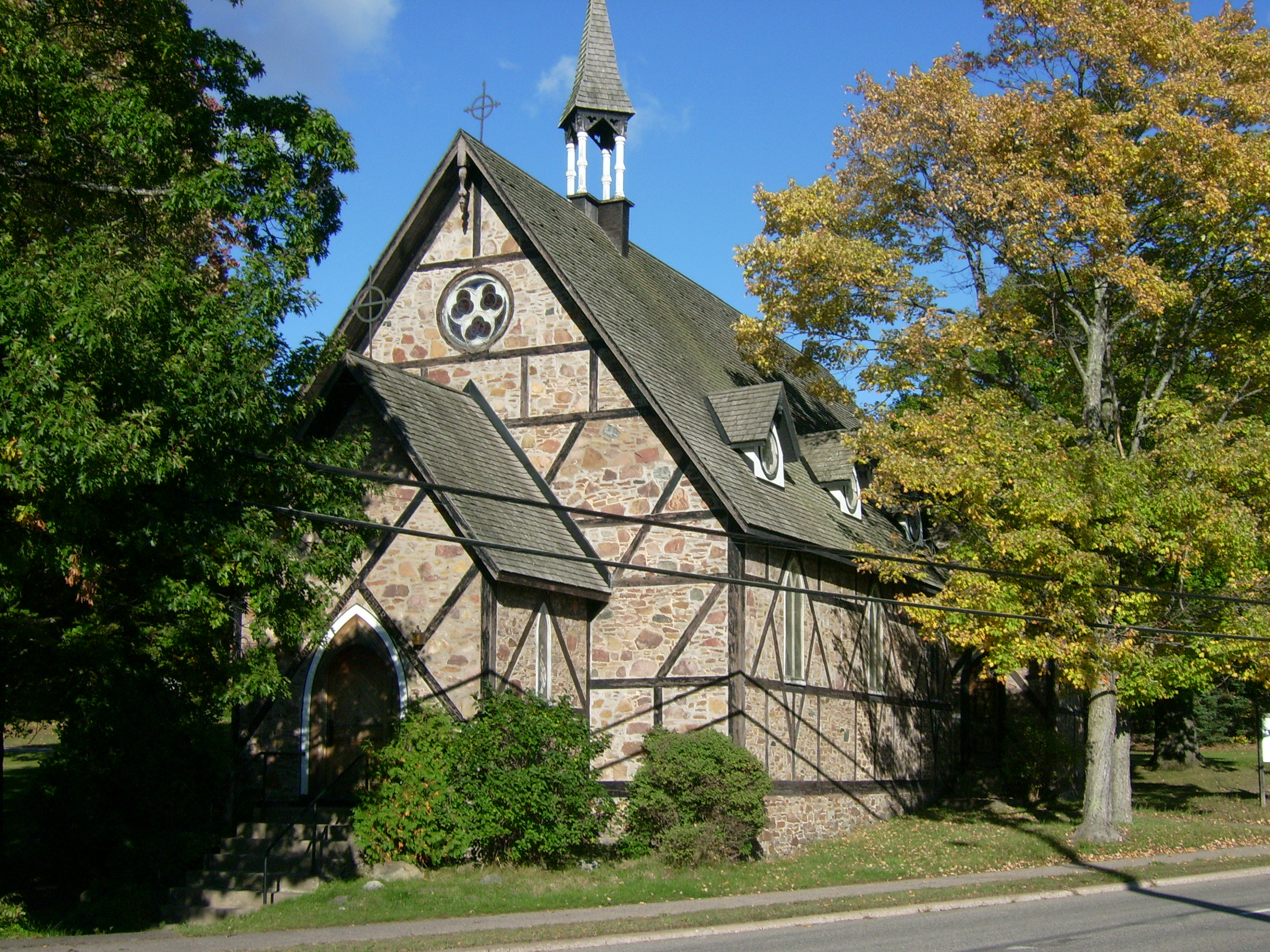
Bishop Fauquier Memorial Chapel

Frederick Dawson Fauquier (29 July 1817 – 7 December 1881) was an eminent Canadian Anglican priest in the second half of the 19th century.

== Personal life ==
Fauquier was born in Malta on 29 July 1817. He was orphaned at a young age and adopted by an aunt who lived in Hampton, London, England. Fauquier received his formative education in Richmond, London.

In 1836 Fauquier emigrated to Upper Canada and settled as a farmer in at East Zorra. He married Sarah Eliza Burrowes, daughter of Colonel Burrowes of the British Army in approximately 1846. Burrowes and Fauquier had two sons.

== Ordained life ==
Fauquier attended the Diocesan Theological Institute in Cobourg in 1842 and studied under Archdeacon A.B. Bethune. He was ordained as a Deacon in 1845 and was ordained by Bishop John Strachan as a priest in 1846. Fauquier was appointed as the incumbent of his home parish at Huntingford, Ontario in 1875.

In 1873 he was appointed to the episcopate as the inaugural Bishop of Algoma. He was consecrated as bishop in St. James' Cathedral, Toronto in 1873 and following his consecration he traveled to his see city of Sault Ste. Marie, Ontario. Within three weeks of his appointment Fauquier traveled to England to raise funds for the new Diocese of Algoma. His trip resulted in support from the Society for the Propagation of Christian Knowledge, the Colonial and Continental, the Society for the Propagation of the Gospel, and many individual donors.

Fauquier was involved in missionary work to First Nations communities in Northern Ontario. He assisted in establishing and maintaining missions at Sheguiandah, Garden River First Nation, and Batchewana First Nation. He was also involved in the administration of the Shingwauk Indian Residential School.

Having become a Doctor of Divinity (DD), he died in post on 7 December 1881. During Fauquier's time as Bishop the Diocese of Algoma grew substantially with the number of clergy doubling, congregations increasing from fifteen to ninety and churches from nine to thirty-four.

Fauquier is buried in the Shingwauk Memorial cemetery, located on the current campus of Algoma University and Shingwauk Kinoomaage Gamig. The Bishop Fauquier Memorial Chapel at the Shingwauk Indian Residential School was named after him.

Religious titles
New title	Bishop of Algoma; 1873–1881	Succeeded by Edward Sullivan
