= David Williams (archbishop of Huron) =

Canada-based Anglican bishop (1853–1931)

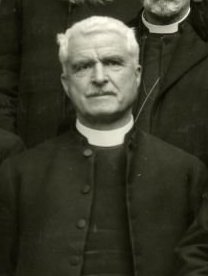
The Right Reverend David Williams in 1924

David Williams was the Anglican Bishop of Huron and later Metropolitan of Ontario in the 20th century.

Born in 1853 and educated at St David’s College, Lampeter, he was ordained in 1885. His first post was a Curate at Blaenau Ffestiniog. In 1887 he became a professor at Huron Theological College. He was the rector of St James’ Stratford from 1892 to 1904 then Archdeacon of Perth. He was ordained to the episcopate as the Bishop of Huron in 1905 and became the Metropolitan of the Province of Ontario in 1926. He died in post on 7 October 1931.

== Notes ==
Anglican Communion titles
Preceded by Maurice Scollard Baldwin	Bishop of Huron; 1905 – 1931	Succeeded by Charles Allen Seager
Preceded by George Thorneloe	Metropolitan of Ontario; 1926– 1931	Succeeded by James Fielding Sweeny
