= Rocksborough Smith =

British bishop (1872–1955)

Rocksborough Remington Smith
- Bishop of Algoma
- Church: Anglican Church of Canada
- Metropolis: Ontario
- Diocese: Diocese of Algoma
- In office: 1926–1939
- Predecessor: George Thorneloe
- Successor: George Frederick Kingston

Orders
- Ordination: 1900 by Bishop Moorhouse
- Consecration: 21 September 1926 by George Thorneloe

Personal details
- Born: November 30, 1872 Brighton, England
- Died: March 5, 1955 (aged 82) Hove, Sussex
- Denomination: Anglicanism

Rocksborough Remington Smith (30 November 1872 – 5 March 1955) was a British Anglican bishop in the first half of the 20th century.

Smith was born in Brighton, England. He earned a Bachelor of Arts degree from the University of London, he also earned a Bachelor of Theology from Salisbury Theological College in 1899. He was ordained as a deacon in 1900 and to priesthood in 1901 in the Manchester Cathedral by Bishop Moorhouse.

In 1902 he completed a Master of Arts degree at Selwyn College, Cambridge. Smith went on to earn a Doctor of Divinity in 1925 from University of King's College, Halifax, Nova Scotia.

He was a Lecturer at Ordsall Hall, Manchester then Vice-Principal of Salisbury Theological College. After this he was Principal of Clergy House, Wimbledon until 1909. He then held a similar post at the Diocesan High School for Europeans in Rangoon until 1914 when he became Vicar of Broadstone, Dorset. In 1921 he became Professor of Divinity at Bishop's University, Lennoxville, Quebec. From 1924 to 1926 he was the examining chaplain to the Anglican Bishop of Quebec.

Smith was consecrated as co-adjutor Bishop of Algoma in Sault Ste. Marie, Ontario on September 21, 1926, by Archbishop George Thorneloe. Smith was the first Bishop of Algoma to be consecrated in his See-Church. In 1927 following the retirement of the previous Bishop, Smith was made Diocesan Bishop of Algoma. He served as Bishop of Algoma until 1939. During his time as Bishop of Algoma Smith brought the Society of St. John the Evangelist to the Muskoka region of the Algoma Diocese.

Returning to England he was first General Secretary of the Church Union, then Rector of Lapford from 1943 until his retirement in 1952; he was also Assistant Bishop of Exeter, 1947–1952. Smith died on April 5, 1955, at Hove, Sussex.

Smith won numerous prizes for his academic scholarship, including:

- Greek Testament Prize (University of Cambridge)
- First Class Theological Tripos Prize (University of Cambridge)
- Bishop John Selwyn Scholarship (University of Cambridge)
- University Hebrew Prize (Salisbury Theological College)
- Delhi Durbar Medal recipient

He was the author of The Epistle of St. Paul's First Trial (1899) and Christianity in the Home (1933).

== Notes ==
Religious titles
Preceded by George Thorneloe	Bishop of Algoma; 1926 – 1939	Succeeded by George Frederick Kingston
