= John Hackenley =

Canadian Anglican bishop (1877–1943)

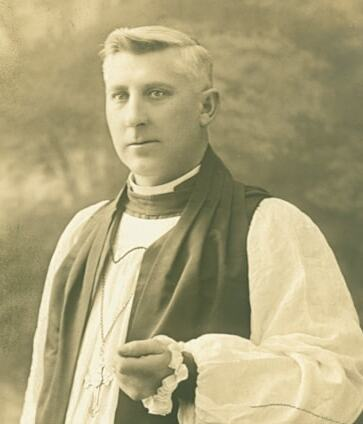

John Hackenley (4 August 1877 – 16 November 1943) was an eminent Anglican priest, the seventh Bishop of Nova Scotia.

Educated at the University of King's College he was ordained in 1904. His first post was a curacy at Digby Neck after which he held incumbencies at Granville, Indian Harbour, La Have and North Sydney. He was then Bishop Coadjutor of Nova Scotia from 1925 until 1934, Bishop of Nova Scotia to 1939 and Archbishop until his death. He married late in life and there is a memorial to him in the church at French Village.

Religious titles
Preceded by Clarendon Worrell	Bishop of Nova Scotia (Archbishop of Nova Scotia from 1939); 1934–1943	Succeeded by Frederick Kingston
Preceded by John Richardson	Metropolitan of Canada; 1939–1943	Succeeded by Philip Carrington
