= Derwyn Jones (bishop) =

Canadian Anglican bishop and priest

Derwyn Dixon Jones DD (5 August 1925 – 8 March 2005) was an eminent Anglican priest and bishop in the second half of the 20th century.

He was born into an ecclesiastical family on 5 August 1925. His father was Walter Jones, priest and Doctor of Divinity. He was educated at the University of Western Ontario, and was ordained in 1947. He held curacies at Holy Trinity, Winnipeg and All Saints', Windsor. He was Rector of St Andrew's, Kitchener and then Assistant Rector at St Paul's Cathedral, London, Ontario. After further incumbencies at the Canon Davis Memorial Church, Sarnia, St Barnabas, Windsor, St Peter's, Brockville and St James, Westminster he became Archdeacon of Middlesex. He was suffragan bishop of Huron in 1982, coadjutor in 1983 and diocesan from 1984 to 1990. After having gained, at some point, a Doctorate of Divinity (DD), he died on 8 March 2005.

Church of England titles
| Preceded by David Ragg | Bishop of Huron; 1984–1994 | Succeeded by Percy O'Driscoll |
