= Percy O'Driscoll =

Canadian Anglican bishop (1934–2026)

The Most Reverend Percy O'Driscoll
- Archbishop of Huron
- Church: Anglican Church of Canada
- Province: Ontario
- Diocese: Huron
- Elected: 1989
- In office: 1990–2000
- Predecessor: Derwyn Jones
- Successor: Bruce Howe
- Other post: Metropolitan of Ontario (1993–2000)
- Previous posts: Suffragan bishop of Huron (1987–1991); Dean of Huron (1980–1986)

Orders
- Ordination: 1964 (diaconate); 1966 (priesthood)
- Consecration: 1987

Personal details
- Born: 4 October 1934
- Died: 17 April 2026 (aged 91)
- Spouse: Sue
- Education: Bishop's University

Percival Richard O'Driscoll (4 October 1934 – 17 April 2026) was a Canadian Anglican bishop. He was bishop of Huron from 1990 to 2000 and metropolitan of the Ecclesiastical Province of Ontario in the Anglican Church of Canada (ACC) from 1993 to 2000.

== Biography ==
O'Driscoll was born on 4 October 1934. He was educated at Bishop's University, and was ordained a deacon in 1964 and a priest in 1966. He was a curate at St Matthias, Ottawa, then at St John the Evangelist, Kitchener. He moved to the Diocese of Huron in 1969 as assistant curate at St. Paul's Cathedral, then held incumbencies at St Michael & All Angels, London and St Batholomew's, Sarnia.

He was Dean of Huron (1980–86) and then its suffragan bishop from his election in 1987. In 1989, he became the coadjutor bishop of Huron, by which he automatically succeeded as diocesan bishop in 1991, serving until 1999. He was also Metropolitan of Ontario for the last seven years of his episcopate. In his metropolitical capacity, he consecrated Victoria Matthews as the first woman bishop in the ACC in 1994.

O'Driscoll retired as diocesan bishop and metropolitan in 2000. He died on 17 April 2026, at the age of 91.

Anglican Communion titles
| Preceded by Derwyn Jones | Bishop of Huron; 1990–2000 | Succeeded by Bruce Howe |
| Preceded by Edwin Lackey | Metropolitan of Ontario; 1993–2000 | Succeeded by Terence Finlay |
