= Bruce Howe =

Canadian Anglican bishop

Bruce Herbert Warren Howe was the 4th coadjutor bishop of Huron who later became its diocesan.

He was born in 1947, educated at the University of King's College and ordained in Nova Scotia in 1974. After working in the Anglican Diocese of Toronto, he returned to Nova Scotia for several years, after which he returned to Ontario in 1988 as Dean of Huron and Rector of St. Paul's Cathedral. He was elected the 11th Bishop of Huron in 2000. He announced his retirement to take effect on 1 September 2008.

Coat of arms of Bruce Howe

Crest
A cross bottony conjoined to the flukes of an anchor Argent surmounted by four trillium leaves in saltire charged with a trillium flower proper;
Escutcheon
Per saltire Azure and Argent, in chief a cross bottony conjoined to the flukes of an anchor, in base a sword Argent hilt and pommel Or surmounted by an open book Argent bound Or, in each flank four trillium leaves in cross charged with a trillium flower proper.
Motto
The Song Not The Singer

Church of England titles
Preceded by Percy O'Driscoll	Bishop of Huron; 2000 – 2008	Succeeded by Bob Bennett
