= Bob Bennett (bishop) =

Canadian Anglican bishop (1949–2025)

The Right Reverend Bob Bennett D.D.
- Bishop of Huron
- Church: Anglican Church of Canada
- Province: Ontario
- Diocese: Huron
- Elected: November 2008
- In office: 2009–2016
- Predecessor: Bruce Howe
- Successor: Linda Nicholls
- Previous posts: Bishop suffragan, Diocese of Huron (2002–2009)

Orders
- Ordination: May 1, 1974 (diaconate); 1975 (priesthood)
- Consecration: September 14, 2002

Personal details
- Born: May 30, 1949
- Died: April 14, 2025 (aged 75) London, Ontario, Canada
- Spouse: Kathleen
- Children: 2
- Education: Huron College

Robert Franklin Bennett (May 30, 1949 – April 14, 2025) was a Canadian Anglican Bishop. He was bishop of Huron between 2009 and 2016.

== Biography ==
Born in 1949 and educated at the University of Western Ontario, Bennett was ordained in 1974. He held curacies at Chesley and Windsor and incumbencies at Simcoe, Port Ryerse, Kitchener and Brantford, all in Ontario. His last posts before elevation to the episcopate were as Rector of All Saints Church, Windsor, Ontario and Archdeacon of Essex.

Bennett was suffragan bishop of Huron from 2002 until his election as the 12th diocesan bishop of Huron in 2008. He was installed as bishop in January 2009 and served until his retirement in 2016.

Bennett died in London, Ontario on April 14, 2025, at the age of 75.

Anglican Communion titles
Preceded by Bruce Howe	Bishop of Huron; 2009–2016	Succeeded by Linda Nicholls
