= Isaac Hellmuth =

Anglican Bishop of the Diocese of Huron in Canada and founder of Huron University College

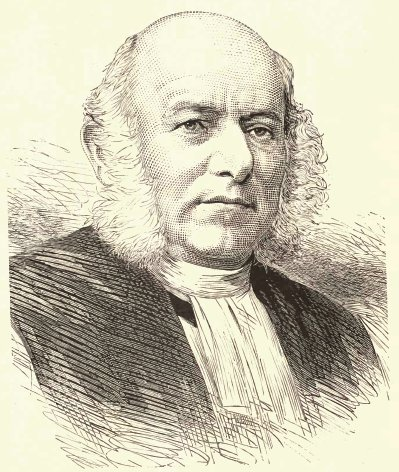
The Right Reverend Isaac Hellmuth

Isaac Hellmuth (December 14, 1819 – 28 May 1901), second Anglican Bishop of the Diocese of Huron, was the founder of Huron University College and the University of Western Ontario, one of Canada's leading universities. He was also founder of Hellmuth Ladies' College and Hellmuth Boys' College, both now defunct, formerly of London, Ontario.

== Biography ==
Isaac was born in Poland in 1819 into a Jewish family and educated at the University of Breslau. His father was a rabbi and he trained to be a rabbi himself. However, intellectual discourse with theologians of other faiths made him question his faith and his father disowned him. He was forced to take his mother’s maiden name.

He moved to England in 1842 and made his decision to convert to Christianity, specifically Anglicanism, and later confirmed to the Church of England in the Dominion of Canada. By 1844 he entered the ministry and was sent to the Anglican Diocese of Toronto. He studied for his ordination and, because of his prior education, soon had an appointment to Bishop's University (Bishop's College) in Lennoxville where he was ordained and became a professor of Hebrew and rabbinical literature.

In 1854 he returned to England and became organizing secretary in London for the Colonial Church and School Society but was asked by the Society to move back to Canada in 1856 as a Superintendent. He resigned in 1861 and was collated Archdeacon of Huron by Bishop Benjamin Cronyn. He acted in a fund-raising capacity to establish Huron College, a training establishment for clergy and the founding college of the University of Western Ontario. He was the first principal of the college until 1866, when he was appointed Dean of Huron. In 1871 he was elevated to coadjutor Bishop of Huron, becoming bishop on Cronyn's death later that year.

Hellmuth founded the Western University of London, Ontario in 1878, which was later renamed University of Western Ontario.

He returned to England in 1883, to become Assistant Bishop of Ripon, but served only briefly; he died in Weston-super-Mare, England in 1901. He had married twice: firstly Catherine Maria Evans, daughter of Thomas Evans, with whom he had three children and secondly Mary Louisa Glyn, née Duncombe. His son, I. F. Hellmuth (1845–1944), was the first champion of what became the Canadian National Tennis Championship, now known as the Canadian Open or the Rogers Cup. Isadore Hellmuth also founded the Toronto Lawn Tennis Club and won the inaugural United States national tennis championship tournament played in 1881 at the Toronto Lawn Tennis Club.

Academic offices
Preceded by New position	Chancellor of the Western University of London, Ontario; 1878–1885	Succeeded by Alfred Peache
