= David Ragg =

Canadian Anglican bishop

Theodore David Butler Ragg (23 November 1919 – 1 July 2002) was the Bishop of Huron in the last third of the 20th century.

Born into an ecclesiastical family and educated the University of Manitoba, he was ordained in 1950. After a curacy at St Michael and All Angels, Toronto he held incumbencies at Nokomis, Wolseley Wolseley and North Vancouver before becoming Archdeacon of Saugeen. He was Bishop of Huron from 1974 to 1984 and died in 2002.

Religious titles
| Preceded by Carmen Queen | Bishop of Huron; 1974–1984 | Succeeded by Derwyn Jones |
