= Linda Nicholls =

Anglican Church of Canada Primate (2019–2024)

The Most Reverend Linda Nicholls
- Primate Emeritus of the Anglican Church of Canada
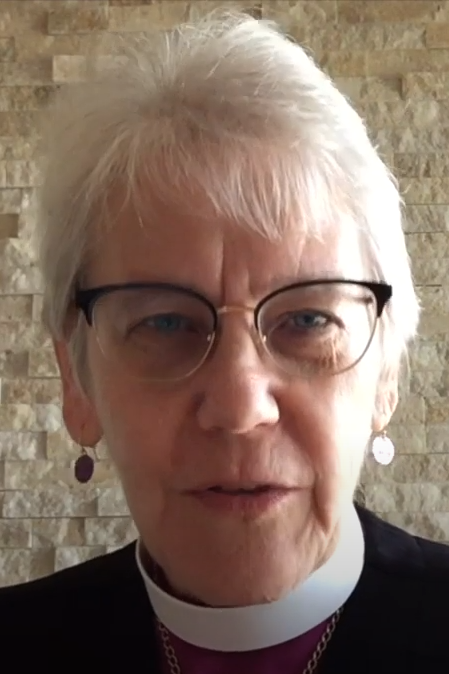
- Nicholls in 2020
- Church: Anglican Church of Canada
- See: Extra-diocesan
- In office: 2019–2024
- Predecessor: Fred Hiltz
- Successor: Shane Parker
- Previous posts: Bishop of Huron (2016–2019); Area Bishop (Trent-Durham), Diocese of Toronto (2008–2016)

Orders
- Ordination: 1986
- Consecration: 2 February 2008

Personal details
- Born: October 25, 1954 (age 72)
- Denomination: Anglicanism

Linda Carol Nicholls (born October 25, 1954) is a Canadian Anglican bishop who served as Primate of the Anglican Church of Canada from 2019 until her retirement in 2024. She was previously Bishop of Huron from 2016 to 2019 and a suffragan bishop in the Anglican Diocese of Toronto from 2008 to 2016. She is the first woman to head the Anglican Church of Canada and the second female primate in the Anglican Communion.

== Ordained ministry ==
Nicholls was educated at Wycliffe College, Toronto, and ordained in 1986. After a curacy in Scarborough, she was the incumbent of the Parish of Georgina from 1987 to 1991 and Holy Trinity, Thornhill from 1991 to 2005. She was also the Co-ordinator for Dialogue within the Anglican Church of Canada until her election as suffragan bishop of the Diocese of Toronto in 2007.

Internationally, Nicholls serves as a member of the Primate's Task Group of the Anglican Communion Office, a member of the Anglican Roman Catholic International Commission III, a participant of Indaba and a faculty member of Living our Vows of the Episcopal Church College of Bishops.

Nationally, Nicholls has served as a member of the Commission on the Marriage Canon from 2013 to 2016, the co-chair of the Anglican-Roman Catholic Dialogue in Canada from 2012–present, a member of the Faith, Worship and Ministry Committee of the Anglican Church of Canada from 2011 to 2016, first as a member and then as the chair of the Standing Committee on Religious Orders of the Anglican Church of Canada House of Bishops, the chair of the Primate's Theological Commission of the Anglican Church of Canada from 2008 to 2010, a member of the Task Force on the Role of the Primacy in the Anglican Church of Canada from 2008 to 2010, co-chair of the Ecumenical Health Care Network of the Canadian Council of Churches, a member of the Canadian Christian Jewish Consultation from 2005 to 2008, co-chair of the National Muslim Christian Liaison Committee from 2005 to 2008, staff resource to the Human Life Task Force from 2005 to 2008, member of the Interfaith Task Group of the Canadian Council of Churches from 2005 to 2008, staff resource to the Faith, Worship and Ministry Committee of the Anglican Church of Canada from 2006 to 2008, a member of the Canadian Anglican-Roman Catholic Dialogue from 1989 to 1998, chaplain to Church House, the national office of the Anglican Church of Canada, a general synod delegate in 2004 and staff to general synod in 2007, a member of the Partners in Mission Committee of General Synod in 2005 and a member of the Windsor Report Response Task Force of the Anglican Church of Canada in 2004–2005.

=== Episcopal ministry ===
Nicholls was consecrated a bishop on 2 February 2008. She served as a suffragan bishop in the Anglican Diocese of Toronto, Canada from 2008 to 2016: she was in charge of the Trent Durham area of the diocese. On 13 February 2016, she was elected coadjutor bishop of the Diocese of Huron – she was the first woman to be elected a bishop in the diocese – and she automatically succeeded to the role of diocesan Bishop of Huron on 1 November 2016, upon the retirement of Robert Bennett.

On 13 July 2019, Nicholls was elected the first female Primate of the Anglican Church of Canada. She was installed as primate on 16 July during a service at Christ Church Cathedral, Vancouver. Nicholls retired on 15 September 2024, one month before reaching 70, the mandatory retirement age for bishops in the Anglican Church of Canada. She was succeeded by Anne Germond, Metropolitan of Ontario, as acting primate.

Anglican Communion titles
Preceded by Fred Hiltz	Primate of the Anglican Church of Canada; 2019–2024	Succeeded by Shane Parker
