= Huron University College =

College in London, Ontario, Canada

Coordinates: 43°0′42.94″N 81°16′47.80″W

- Former names: Huron College (1863–2000)
- Motto: Vera Religio Ac Scientia Vera (Latin)
- Motto in English: True Religion and Sound Learning
- Type: Affiliated college
- Established: 5 May 1863
- Parent institution: University of Western Ontario
- Religious affiliation: Anglican Church of Canada
- Academic affiliations: AUCC; IAU; COU; CIS; ACU; ATS; CUP
- Chancellor: Prem Watsa
- President: Barry L. Craig
- Administrative staff: 125 (faculty included)
- Undergraduates: 1500 full-time
- Postgraduates: 15
- Location: London, Ontario, Canada
- Campus: Urban
- Colours: Red; white; black
- Mascot: Beaver
- Website: huronatwestern.ca

Huron University College is a university college affiliated with the University of Western Ontario in London, Ontario, Canada. It was Incorporated on the 5 May 1863. Huron is the founding institution of the University of Western Ontario.

It was established by two Anglican clergyman in the year 1863 and the oldest affiliated institution of the University of Western Ontario. Huron is also home to an Anglican seminary and predates the establishment of the University of Western Ontario by 15 years and acted as a founding element of the larger university. In the latter half of the 20th century, Huron evolved from its theological roots into a modern liberal arts college.

== History ==
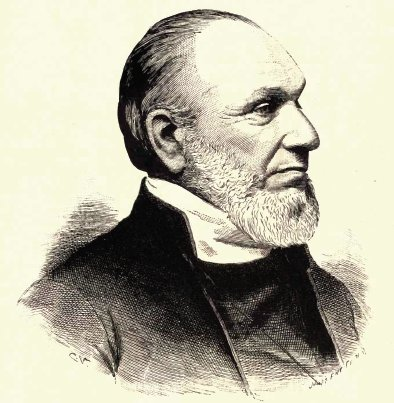
Benjamin Cronyn

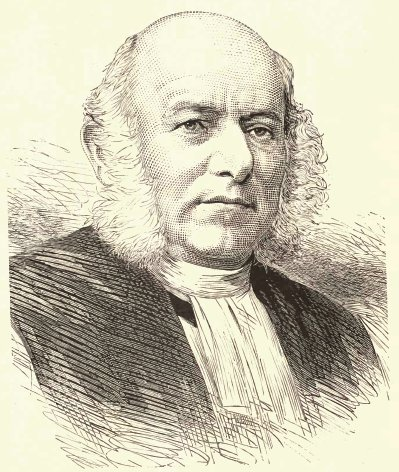
Isaac Hellmuth

Huron was founded on 5 May 1863 by Benjamin Cronyn (first Bishop of Huron) and Isaac Hellmuth (Archdeacon of Huron), as an evangelical low-church alternative to the high-church University of Trinity College in Toronto. The first class of 13 students was taught by Isaac Hellmuth (Huron's first principal) in the winter of 1863.

The evangelical section of the Church of England obtained a charter for Huron, under the name of the Western University of London in 1878. It has been a University of Western Ontario founding institution since 1878 (the oldest affiliated institution of the University of Western Ontario).

William A. Joanes (architect) designed an addition to Huron College's original property in 1891.

Over one-fifth of Canadian Anglican chaplains who served in the First and Second World Wars were trained at Huron. A plaque was unveiled on 11 November 1997 to commemorate the lives of 18 Huron graduates who died in the First and Second World Wars.

Its original property, known as Rough Park, occupied the block bounded by Grosvenor, St. George and St. James Streets. In 1951, Huron moved to its present location and has since seen a growth in not only student enrollment, but also in its residence facilities, classrooms, library, and faculty offices. Huron's faculty of Arts and Social Science has been in partnership with the University of Western Ontario since 1956.

An Act respecting Huron was given Royal Assent on 23 June 2000. The name was changed to Huron University College on 23 June 2000. The Huron University College Corporation's Arms, Supporters, Flag and Badge were registered with the Canadian Heraldic Authority on 15 September 2005.

== Administration ==
=== Governance ===
Huron is currently governed by the Ontario Huron University College Act, 2000. The act provides for an executive board composed of The Bishop of Huron, the Coadjutor and Suffragan Bishop or Bishops of Huron, the principal of Huron, the president of the Huron's Students' Council, the deans of Huron, the president of the alumni association, a full-time student from each of the Faculty of Theology and Faculty of Arts and Social Sciences, and up to 12 additional members. The Act also provides for an Academic Council to oversee issues relating to the academic life of Huron College.

As an affiliate of the University of Western Ontario, Huron is also subject to an Affiliation Agreement which outlines the relationship between both universities. Under this agreement, the university grants degrees on behalf of Huron College and has authority to set common academic and admission standards in consultation with Huron and the other affiliate college, King's College. Huron retains the right to grant Honorary Doctor of Divinity degrees.

The strategic plan for 2005–2010 aims to "nurture a sense of community respectful of individual differences and responsive to individual needs; to support an active student life which encourages the personal and intellectual growth of its members; and, through its chapel and theological programs, to affirm its heritage as an Anglican university."

=== School structure ===
The majority of students are enrolled in the Faculty of Arts and Social Sciences, which offers over 60 undergraduate programs of study. The remainder of students are enrolled in undergraduate and graduate programs through the Faculty of Theology.

=== Campus property ===
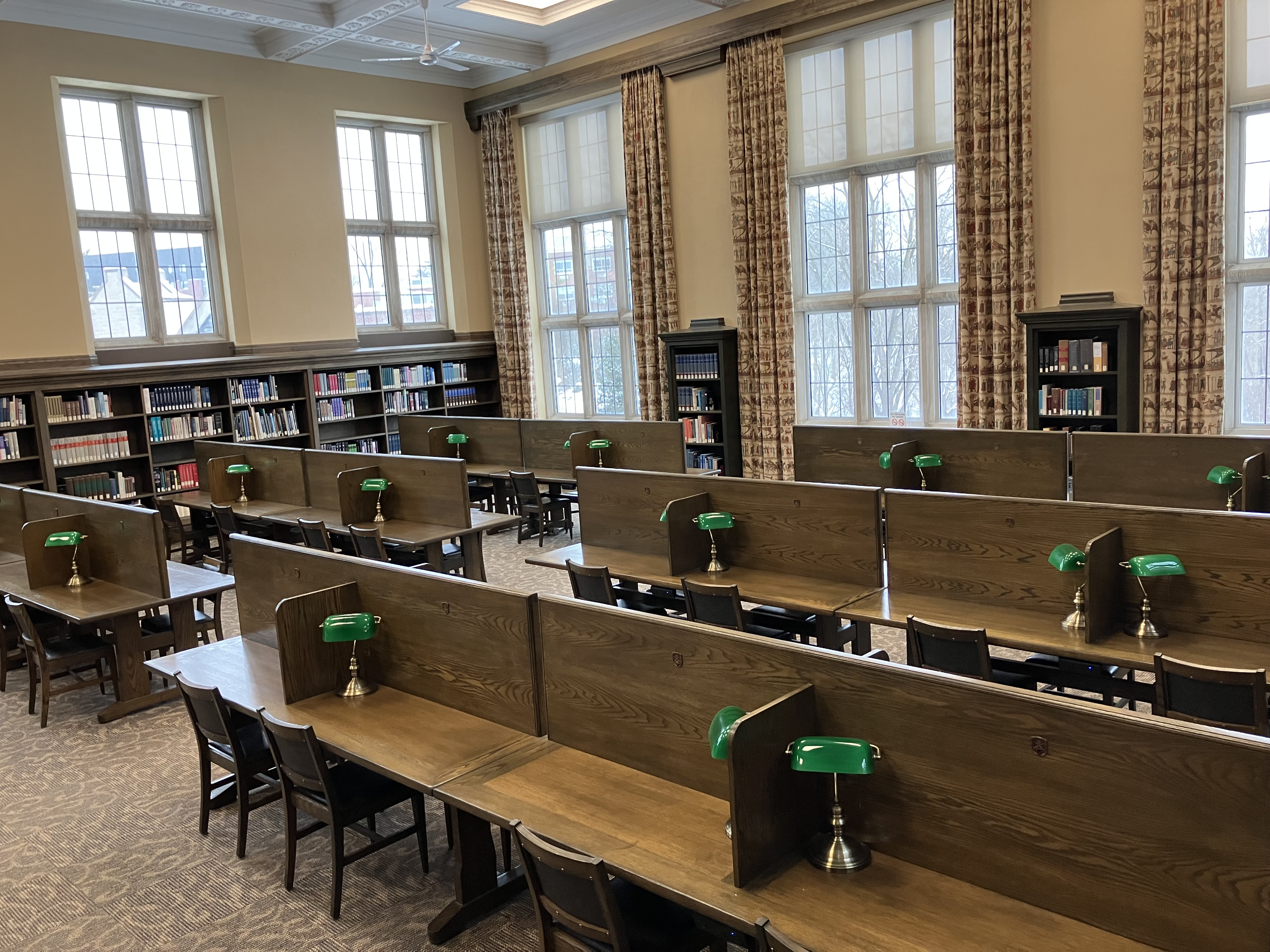
Huron University Library

Rough Park, its original property, occupied the block bounded by Grosvenor, St. George and St. James Streets in London Ontario. In 1951, Huron moved to its present location steps from the University of Western Ontario.

Huron is located on the western side of Western Road, across from the centre of the University of Western Ontario Main Campus. The University Community Centre (UCC) and the Weldon Library are also nearby.

The Administrative Wing includes the Silcox Memorial Library, the Great Hall and the Chapel of St. John the Evangelist. The Valley Wing includes Jago Courtyard and classrooms. The Huron dining hall is steps from the Western campus. Classroom W12, one of Huron's largest classrooms, which holds 120 seats, is used for many first-year courses and larger lectures. The Kingsmill Room in Huron's main building is used for larger events such as convocations and guest lectures.

Chapel

Huron is also home to the collegiate-style Chapel of St. John the Evangelist, which was built in the 1950s to replace the original chapel. The chapel has a seating capacity of 160 and includes a Casavant organ. There are also a number of Orthodox icons, including a 19th-century hand-painted Russian icon of the Holy Trinity. The chapel is open to students of all denominations.

Huron Library

The Huron University College Library is located on the main floor of the administration wing of the Huron campus. The library has a collection of over 165,000 volumes. The Kimel Family Information Commons has 3 PC workstations and wireless Internet access. Comfortable reading alcoves and private group study rooms are available in addition to personal study carrels. All registered students, faculty and staff at Huron and Western, as well as qualified guest borrowers may borrow from the Huron Library.

== Campus life ==
=== Residence ===
Huron has four residence halls: Hellmuth Hall, a co-ed residence accommodating approximately 98 first-year students; O'Neil/Ridley Hall, a co-ed dormitory, 185 students including a hall for upper-year students; Southwest Residence, a suite-style residence building, 56 first-year students; and Burnlea Hall, a co-ed dormitory with over 300 bedrooms. Huron also has two houses on campus, Brough House and Henderson House, which provide lodging for upper-year students.

=== Huron University College Students' Council ===
The Huron University College Students’ Council (HUCSC) is a student government organization and non-profit corporation at Huron.

There are typically 70+ members and positions on the HUCSC ranging from executive positions, elected councillors and representatives, hired bartenders, commissioners, coordinators, and associate vice-presidents. The HUCSC consists of 6 portfolios: the President's Portfolio, the Student Affairs Portfolio, the Student Events Portfolio, the Finance and Administration Portfolio, the Communications Portfolio, and the Governance Portfolio.

== Academics ==
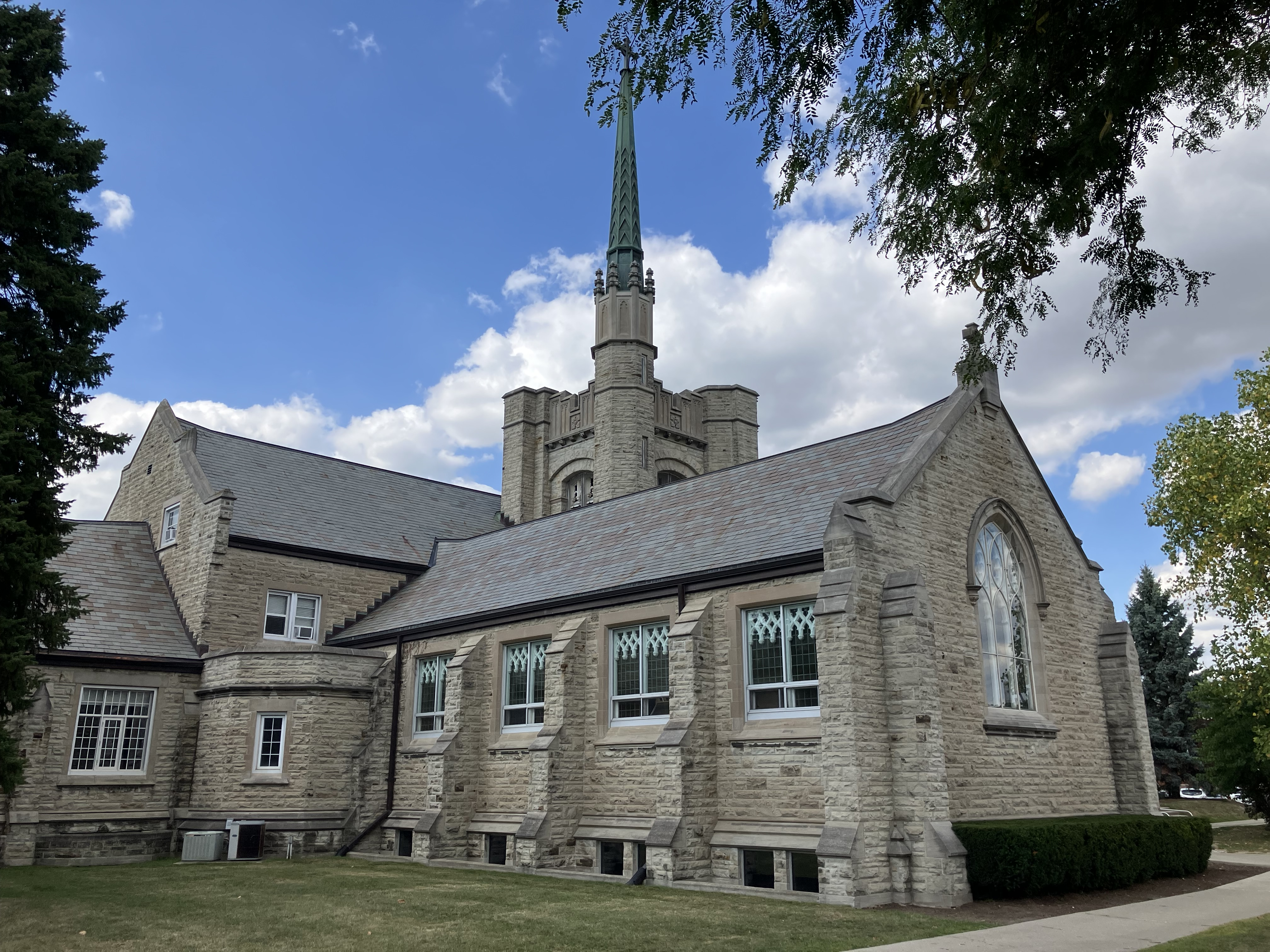
A view of Huron University College in 2025

Huron offers programs in the arts and social sciences, business, and theology. Degrees are granted by Western University. Students are free to take up to forty percent of their courses at Western, and thus can even complete a major at Western.

Students may choose to pursue a dual degree in collaboration with the Ivey School of Business. Moreover, Huron has established a partnership with Harvard Business School, enabling students to earn online a Credential of Readiness (HBX CORe).

The Faculty of Theology has 56 students enrolled in its Master of Divinity and Master of Theological Studies programs. The faculty includes Ingrid Mattson, who is the chair of Islamic Studies.

=== Research Opportunities ===
Centre for Undergraduate Research Learning

Through the Centre for Undergraduate Research Learning (CURL) students apply for funding and research fellowships. After completing a research project, they are able to present their findings in a capstone CURL Showcase event at the end of the year.

Liberated Arts Undergraduate Research Journal

To Liberated Arts, a peer-reviewed academic journal, students submit original research. This is an open access publication. It is available online and at the University of Western Ontario and Huron University College libraries. The ISSN number is 2369–1573.

== Principals of Huron ==
- Isaac Hellmuth 1863–1866
- William Wickes 1866–1868
- Isaac Brock 1868–1872
- Michael Boomer 1872–1885
- R. G. Fowell 1885–1890
- H. G. Miller 1890–1895
- B. Watkins 1895–1901
- C. C. Waller 1902–1941
- A. H. O'Neil 1941–1952
- W. R. Coleman 1952–1960
- W. A. Townshend (Acting Principal) 1961–1962
- J. G. Morden 1962–1984
- J. A. Trentman 1984–1985
- F. W. Burd (Acting Principal) 1985–1987
- C. J. Jago 1987–1995
- T. Fulton (Acting Principal) 1995–1996
- D. Bevan 1996–2001
- R. Lumpkin 2001–2010
- T. Fulton (Acting Principal) October 2010 – June 2011
- S. McClatchie 2011–2016
- B. L. Craig 2016–present

== Notable alumni ==
- Terence Finlay (BA 1959) — retired Anglican archbishop of Toronto and Metropolitan of the Ecclesiastical Province of Ontario.
- William Cliff (M.Div 1992, H.D.Div 2013) — Bishop of the Anglican Diocese of Ontario.
- Todd Townshend (M.Div 1992, H.D.Div 2022) — Bishop of the Anglican Diocese of Huron.
- Julio César Martín-Trejo (1991, H.D.Div 2023) — Bishop of the Anglican Diocese of Southeast Mexico.
- Andrew Asbil (M.Div 1988, H.D.Div 2019) — Bishop of the Anglican Diocese of Toronto
- Robert Skirving (M.Div 1986) — Bishop of the Episcopal Diocese of East Carolina.
- Kevin Robertson (BA 1992) - Suffragan Bishop of the Anglican Diocese of Toronto
- Geoffrey Woodcroft (M.Div 1990, H.D.Div 2019) - Retired Bishop of the Anglican Diocese of Rupert's Land
- John Chapman (M.Div 1978) — Anglican Bishop of Ottawa
- Michael Medline – CEO of Empire Company Limited (BA 1984)
- Richard McLaren – law professor, (HBA 1968)
- David Beaupre – vice president of business development for LafargeHolcim Canada (BA 1997)
- Peter Aceto — president and chief executive officer of ING DIRECT Canada, (BA 1991)
- Alfred Apps (BA 1979) — president of the Liberal Party of Canada since 2009
- Paul Beeston (BA 1967) — president of the Toronto Blue Jays.
- J. Douglas Cunningham (BA 1963) — Associate Chief Justice of the Ontario Superior Court of Justice
- Michael Eizenga (BA 1979) — former president of the Liberal Party of Canada
- Adrienne Arsenault (BA 1990) - Chief Correspondent, CBC News.
- Norman Elder (BA 1962) — notable eccentric and Olympic competitor.
- Charles Jago (BA 1965) — former principal of Huron University College, former president of University of Northern British Columbia
- Janice MacKinnon (BA 1969) — former Saskatchewan Minister of Finance
- Paul Macklin (BA 1967) — former Member of Parliament
- John A. MacNaughton CM (BA 1967) — former CEO of the Canada Pension Plan, member of the Order of Canada
- Constantine 'Gus' Meglis (BA 1985) — Greek-Canadian opera singer
- Peter Mercer (BA 1976) — president of Ramapo College
- Ian D. C. Newbould — University President, Richmond, The American International University in London (BA 1964)
- Rachael Parker — Canadian Anglican bishop (MDiv 1999)
- David Patchell-Evans (BA 1977) — founder of GoodLife Fitness
- Ruth Phelan (BA 1981) — Canadian food critic and author, contributor to the Toronto Sun
- David Steinberg — judge of the Ontario Superior Court of Justice (BA 1960)
- Allison Vuchnich (BA 1992) — correspondent for Global Television
- Louis Weatherhead — former president of the Canadian Dermatology Association
- Frank E. Holmes (BA 1978) — CEO and chief investment officer for U.S. Global Investors Inc.
- Galen Weston (BA 1961) — executive chairman of George Weston Limited
