= Diocese of Huron =

Diocese of the Anglican Church in Canada

Location
- Country: Canada
- Ecclesiastical province: Ontario
- Coordinates: 42.618°N 81.914°W

Statistics
- Parishes: 124
- Members: 21,000

Information
- Denomination: Anglican Church of Canada
- Rite: Anglican
- Cathedral: St. Paul's Cathedral, London

Current leadership
- Bishop: Todd Townshend

Map
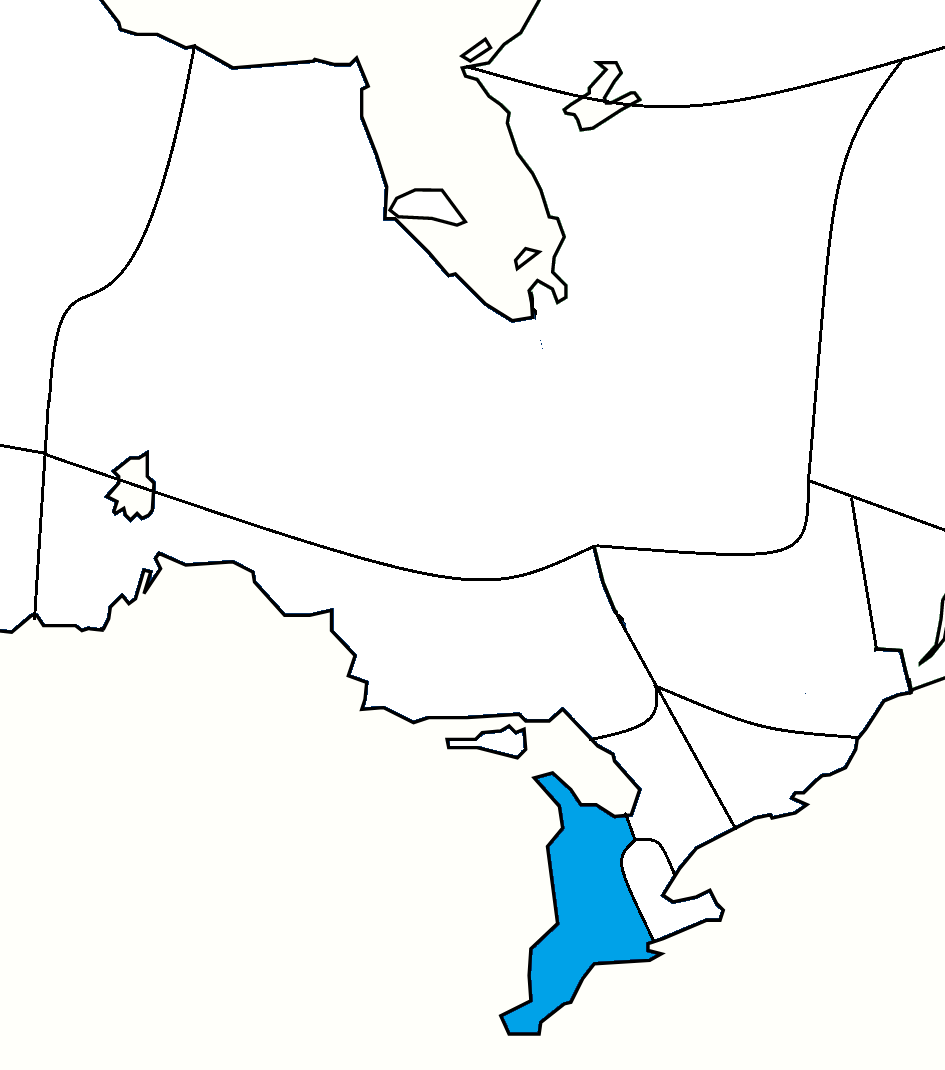
- The boundaries of the diocese within the Ecclesiastical Province of Ontario.

Website
- diohuron.org

The Diocese of Huron is a diocese of the Ecclesiastical Province of Ontario of the Anglican Church of Canada. The diocese comprises just over 31,000 square kilometres in southwestern Ontario, sandwiched between Lake Huron and Lake Erie. Its See city is London, and its parish rolls of 50,000 are served by 177 congregations.

The territory covered by the diocese was under the jurisdiction of the Diocese of Quebec until 1839, and was included in the Diocese of Toronto from 1839 until 1857. Its first bishop, Benjamin Cronyn, was the first to be elected by a diocesan synod in Canada. In 1866, there were two archdeaconries: C. Crosbie Brough was Archdeacon of Huron and Isaac Hellmuth of London. In addition to London, other major communities within the diocese are: Brantford, Cambridge, Chatham, Kitchener, Sarnia, Stratford, Waterloo, and Windsor. The diocese maintains chaplaincies at Canterbury College in Windsor, Renison University College in Waterloo and Huron University College in London, which has an affiliated seminary. A parish in Brantford, Ontario also supports chaplaincy ministry at the local campus of Wilfrid Laurier University.

The diocesan bishop from July 2009 to November 2017 was Robert Bennett, who retired November 1, 2016. He was supported by Terry Dance, who was elected as suffragan bishop on 28 March 2009 and consecrated in St. Paul's Cathedral, London, Ontario, on 6 June 2009. Bishop Terry Dance retired December 31, 2015. Linda Nicholls, former suffragan bishop of the Diocese of Toronto area of Trent-Durham was elected coadjutor bishop on February 13, 2016, and assumed the role of the diocesan bishop on November 1, 2016, with the retirement of Robert Bennett.

In July 2019 Linda Nicholls was elected Primate of the Anglican Church of Canada at the 2019 General Synod. Before assuming her duties as the head of the Anglican Church of Canada, she had to leave her post in Huron on September 30, 2019. Until the installment of the new bishop, the diocese was administered by Colin Johnson, retired metropolitan of Ontario and archbishop of Toronto and Moosonee.

On October 26, 2019, Todd Townshend was elected the next bishop of Huron. He assumed his role as the 14th bishop of Huron when consecrated 25 January 2020.

The dean of St. Paul's Cathedral is Kevin George. He was appointed by Bishop Todd Townshend as dean of St. Paul's Cathedral on January 1, 2024.

== Bishops of Huron ==
| No. | Image | Name | Dates | Notes |
|---|---|---|---|---|
| 1 | | Benjamin Cronyn | 1857–1871 | |
| 2 | | Isaac Hellmuth | 1871–1883 | |
| 3 | | Maurice Baldwin | 1883–1904 | |
| 4 | | David Williams | 1905–1931 | Metropolitan of Ontario, 1926–1931 |
| 5 | | Charles Seager | 1932–1948 | Metropolitan of Ontario, 1944–1948 |
| 6 | | George Luxton | 1948–1970 | |
| 7 | | Carmen Queen | 1970–1974 | |
| 8 | | David Ragg | 1974–1984 | |
| 9 | | Derwyn Jones | 1984–1990 | |
| 10 | | Percy O'Driscoll | 1991–2000 | Suffragan Bishop, 1987–1989; Bishop coadjutor, 1989–1991; Metropolitan of Ontario, 1993–2000 |
| 11 | | Bruce Howe | 2000–2008 | |
| 12 | | Bob Bennett | 2008–2016 | |
| 13 | | Linda Nicholls | 2016–2019 | Primate of Canada, 2019- |
| 14 | | Todd Townshend | 2020–present | |
