= Benjamin Cronyn =

Irish Bishop

The Right Reverend Benjamin Cronyn
- 1st Bishop of Huron
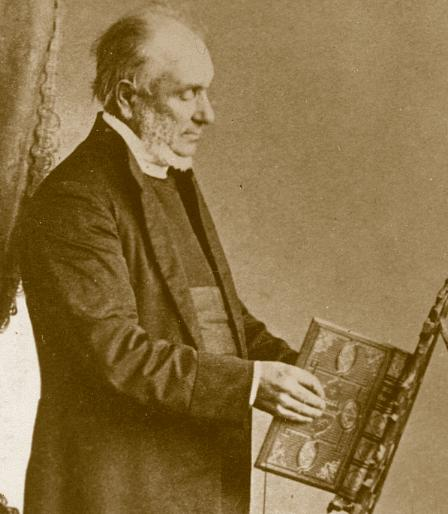
- Cronyn c. 1860s
- Church: Church of England in Canada
- Diocese: Huron

Personal details
- Born: July 11, 1802 Killermogh, County Laois, Ireland
- Died: September 21, 1871 (aged 69) London, Middlesex County, Ontario, Canada
- Denomination: Anglican

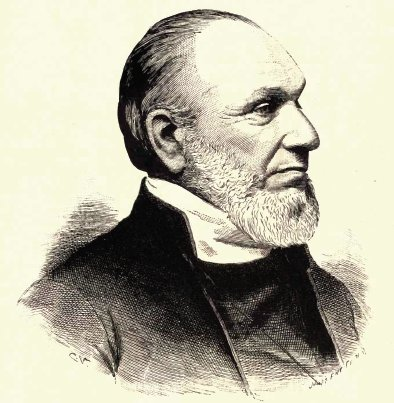
The Right Reverend Benjamin Cronyn

The Rt. Rev. Benjamin Cronyn (11 July 1802 – 21 September 1871) was an Irish prelate who served as the first bishop of the Anglican Diocese of Huron.

Cronyn was born in County Laois, Ireland, and educated at Trinity College, Dublin. A member of the prominent Anglo-Irish Cronyn family, who were part of the Protestant Ascendancy in Ireland, he emigrated to Canada in 1832. He was posted to London, Ontario, where he completed the church building started by his predecessor. In 1844, he relocated the church to a better site, now occupied by St Paul's Cathedral. When the new Diocese of Huron was created in 1857, he was elected its first bishop and travelled to London in Great Britain to be consecrated, the last Canadian bishop required to go to Britain to do so.

A noted Low Church cleric, he distrusted what he considered to be the Romanising tendencies of Toronto's Trinity College, and in 1863 he founded Huron University College, which in 1908 grew into the secularised University of Western Ontario.

He died in London, Ontario, in 1871. He had been married in Ireland to Margaret Ann Bickerstaff of Lislea, County Longford, with whom he had seven children. On her death, he was married to Martha Collins. He was father to Benjamin Cronyn, Jr., a former Mayor of London, Ontario. He was the father-in-law of Edward Blake, Premier of Ontario, and grandfather of politician Hume Cronyn, Sr., and great-grandfather of actor Hume Cronyn, Jr., and artist Hugh Verschoyle Cronyn, GM.

In 1957, a biography, entitled Benjamin Cronyn: First Bishop of Huron, was written by The Very Reverend Alfred Henchman Crowfoot and was published by The Incorporated Synod of the Diocese of Huron.

== See also ==
- Huron University College
- Robert Whitehead (theatre producer), relative
