= St. Luke's Cathedral (Sault Ste. Marie, Ontario) =

Anglican cathedral of the Diocese of Algoma in Sault Ste. Marie, Ontario

Cathedral and Metropolitical Church of St. Luke
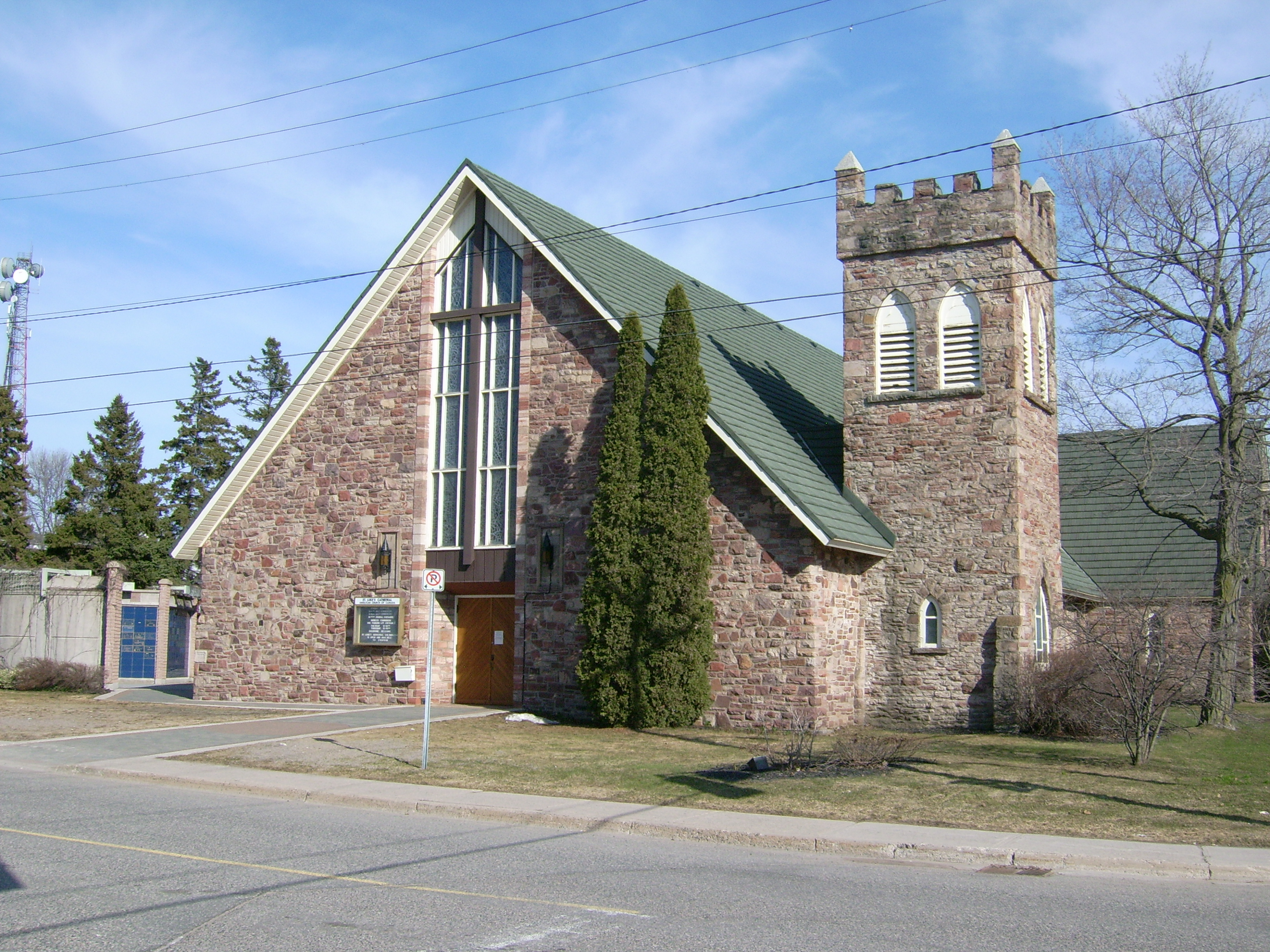
- Cathedral and Metropolitical Church of St. Luke
- 46.51014°N 84.32835°W
- Location: 160 Brock Street; Sault Ste. Marie, Ontario; P6A 3B7
- Country: Canada
- Denomination: Anglican
- Website: www.stlukesalgoma.com

History
- Status: Cathedral

Architecture
- Functional status: Active
- Architectural type: Gothic Revival; Modernist
- Completed: 1870

Clergy
- Archbishop: The Most Rev. Anne Germond
- Dean: The Very Rev. Victoria Matthews

Cathedral and Metropolitical Church of St. Luke is the Anglican cathedral of the Diocese of Algoma. It is located in Sault Ste. Marie, Ontario, and was built in 1870.

St. Luke's was the first Anglican church built in Sault Ste. Marie. The building was consecrated on October 18, 1870. In 1873, when the Diocese of Algoma was established, St. Luke's was designated as the Diocese's Pro-Cathedral.
