= Thorneloe University =

College in Ontario, Canada

Coordinates: 46.46307°N 80.97054°W

- Religious affiliation: Anglican Church of Canada
- Academic affiliations: ACCC, CBIE
- Chancellor: The Rev. Dr. Patti Brace
- President: The Rev. Jason Tripp
- Vice-Chancellor: The Rev. Jason Tripp
- Provost: The Rev. Dr. GailMarie Henderson (interim)
- Location: Sudbury, Ontario, Canada
- Campus: Urban/suburban
- Sporting affiliations: CCAA
- Website: thorneloe.ca

Thorneloe University, also known as Thorneloe University at Laurentian, is an Anglican affiliated university formerly federated with, and still inset on the campus of, the larger Laurentian University in Sudbury, Ontario, Canada.

== Programs ==
The university offers programs in fine arts including music (in conjunction with Laurentian University), theatre performance, theatre production (in conjunction with Cambrian College) and film production, religious studies, classical studies, women's studies and theatre arts. Thorneloe University also offers a certificate, diploma, and bachelor's degree in theology.

== Faculty ==
- The Chancellor is the Rev. Dr. Patti Brace.
- The President and Vice Chancellor is the Rev. Jason Tripp.
- The Provost, Director of the School of Theology, and Dean of the Fielding Memorial Chapel of St. Mark is the Very Rev. Dr. Jay Koyle.
- The Dean of Residence is Stacy Allarie-Sathaseevan.
- The Executive Administrator and Registrar is Jessica Lamirande.

== Facilities ==
In addition to classroom, administrative and faculty offices, Thorneloe University houses a 143-seat theatre and a 58-room student residence.

=== Fielding Memorial Chapel of St. Mark ===
The Fielding Memorial Chapel of St. Mark is a Chapel located on the site of Thorneloe. Designed by Townend Stefura Baleshta Architects (now Bélanger Salach Architecture), construction was completed in 1968 by Neil Smith Construction Ltd. From September to April, the chapel is used as a place of Anglican worship at noon on Thursdays. Some professors decide to use the space for teaching their courses, or host performances from Thorneloe's theatre and acting programs. In 2017, it received both the Ontario Association of Architects Landmark Award and heritage building status from the city of Greater Sudbury.
