= Holy Trinity Anglican Church (Winnipeg) =

Church in Winnipeg, Manitoba, Canada

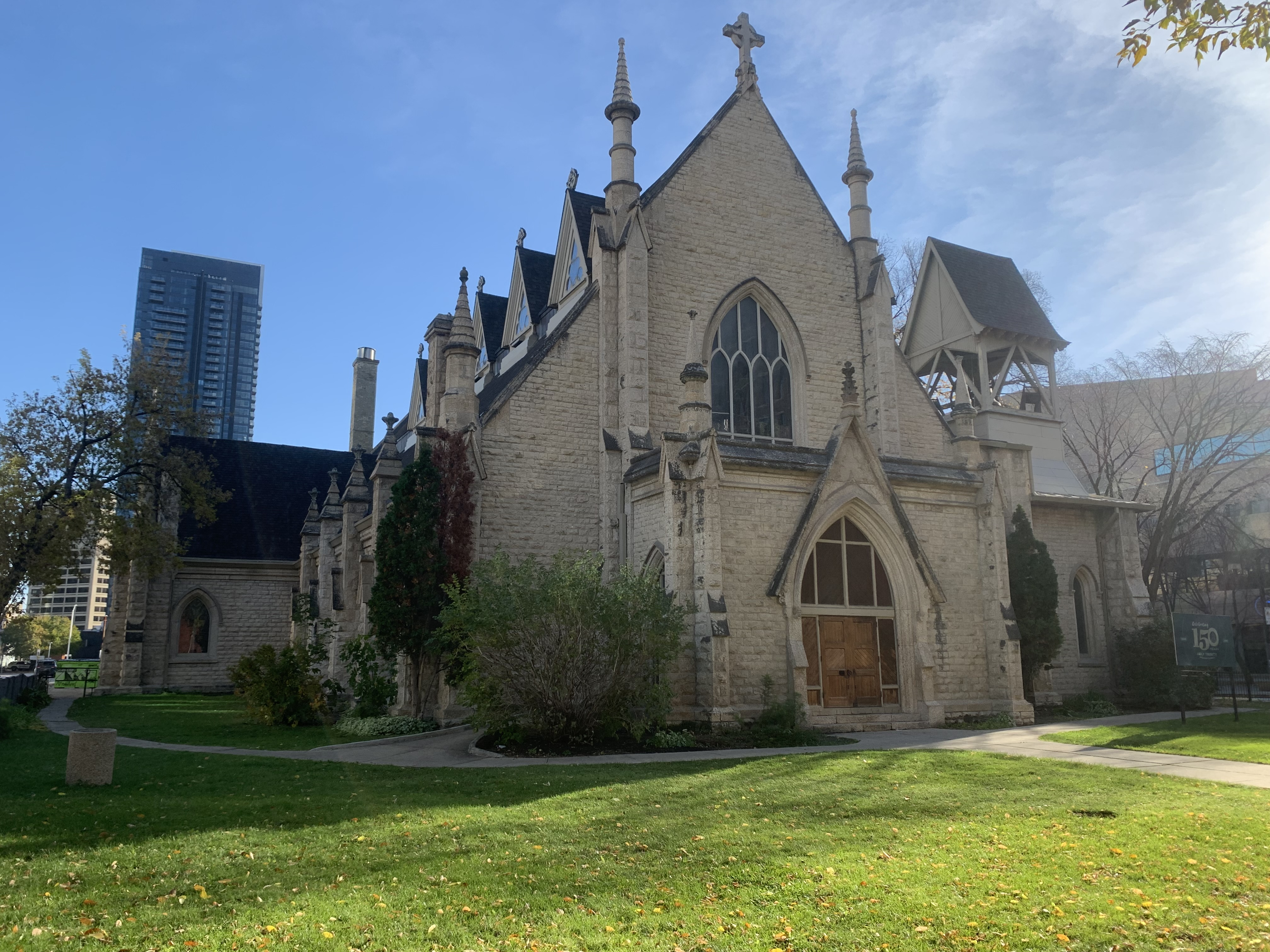
- The west entrance of Holy Trinity Church in 2025
- Holy Trinity Anglican Church
- 49.8926°N 97.1422°W
- Location: Winnipeg, Manitoba
- Address: 256 Smith Street
- Country: Canada
- Denomination: Anglican Church of Canada
- Website: holytrinitywpg.com

History
- Founded: 1867
- Founder: John McLean
- Dedication: Trinity
- Dedicated: August 4, 1884

Architecture
- Architect: Charles Henry Wheeler
- Style: High Victorian; Gothic revival
- Years built: 1883–1884
- Groundbreaking: August 13, 1883

Specifications
- Capacity: 800
- Length: 45.8 m (150 ft)
- Width: 17.1 m (56 ft)
- Materials: Limestone

Administration
- Province: Northern Lights
- Diocese: Rupert's Land

National Historic Site of Canada
- Designated: February 23, 1990

Holy Trinity Anglican Church is a historic Anglican church in downtown Winnipeg, Manitoba, Canada. Founded in 1867, the fourth and current Gothic Revival church was built from 1883 to 1884. It is part of the Anglican Church of Canada's Diocese of Rupert's Land. Since 1990, it has been recognized as a National Historic Site of Canada and listed on Winnipeg's heritage register for its expression of the High Victorian Gothic style.

== History ==
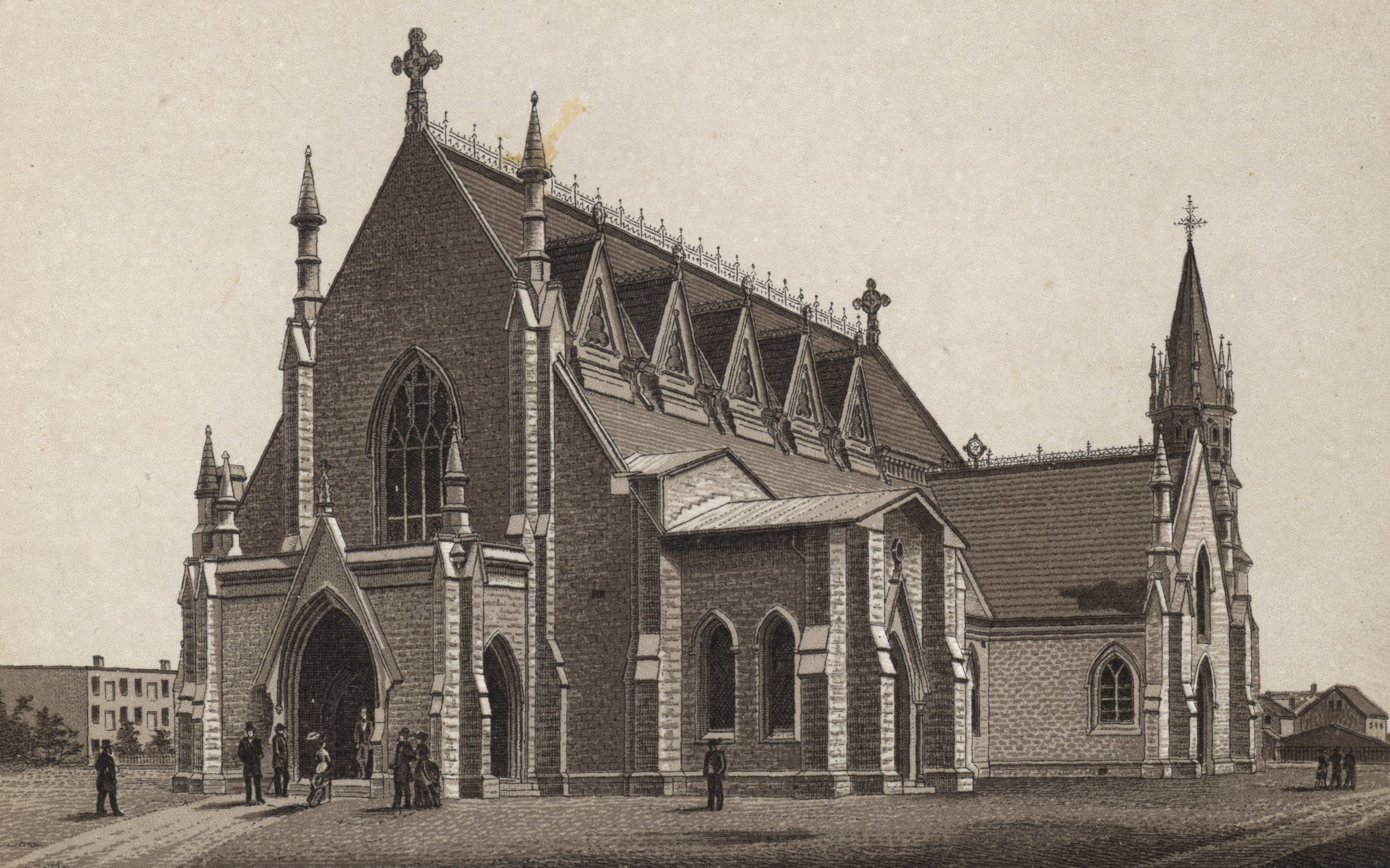
A sketch of the completed church c. 1889

Holy Trinity was founded in 1867, predating the founding of Winnipeg. As the region boomed with the arrival of settlers in the Red River Valley and then the advent of the railroad, the church outgrew three different locations before settling on a vacant lot and Donald Street and Graham Avenue, then on the outskirts of the town. The church hired Charles H. Wheeler, a young architect newly arrived in Canada from Britain, to design its building. The church was dedicated on August 4, 1884, by Archbishop Robert Machray.

The church has had a number of notable clergy during its history, including first rector Octave Fortin (archdeacon of Winnipeg), John Grisdale (a future bishop of Qu'Appelle), Derwyn Jones (a future bishop of Huron), Henry Martin and founding priest John McLean (future bishops of Saskatchewan), and Naboth Manzongo (a future bishop of Rupert's Land). The church has also been used for major events of the Anglican Church of Canada, hosting, for example, the election of Fred Hiltz as primate during the 2007 General Synod.

In 1989, a geological survey found the church's foundation needed total replacement. The following year, the church was designated a National Historic Site for its well-preserved expression of Victorian Gothic church design, interior woodwork and use of Gothic decorative motifs. However, no work was done on the foundation, and by 2024, the church reached such a state of disrepair that the estimates had climbed to $7 million and the building was on the brink of structural collapse or condemnation. Bishop Geoffrey Woodcroft authorized the church to explore a sale or redevelopment opportunity. The church had also declined in attendance, with 30 to 60 people worshipping each week in a building designed to seat 800. In April 2025, Holy Trinity and the diocese signed a memorandum with Winnipeg's downtown development agency and an architectural firm to support the church's restoration, beginning with a rehabilitation study that would focus on designing a new foundation for the troubled structure.

== Architecture ==
=== Exterior ===
Wheeler designed the church in a High Victorian Gothic style. The church is built of rusticated Tyndall limestone. At the time of its completion, the Manitoba Free Press called it "as fine a specimen of pure Gothic architecture as to be found on this continent."

The church is topped by a steeply pitched double hammerbeam roof in which one set of hammerbeams rests atop another, expanding the width of the nave but creating a more delicate roof structure. Buttresses below the roofline are capped with turrets. Dripstones above each door feature carved human faces.

=== Interior ===
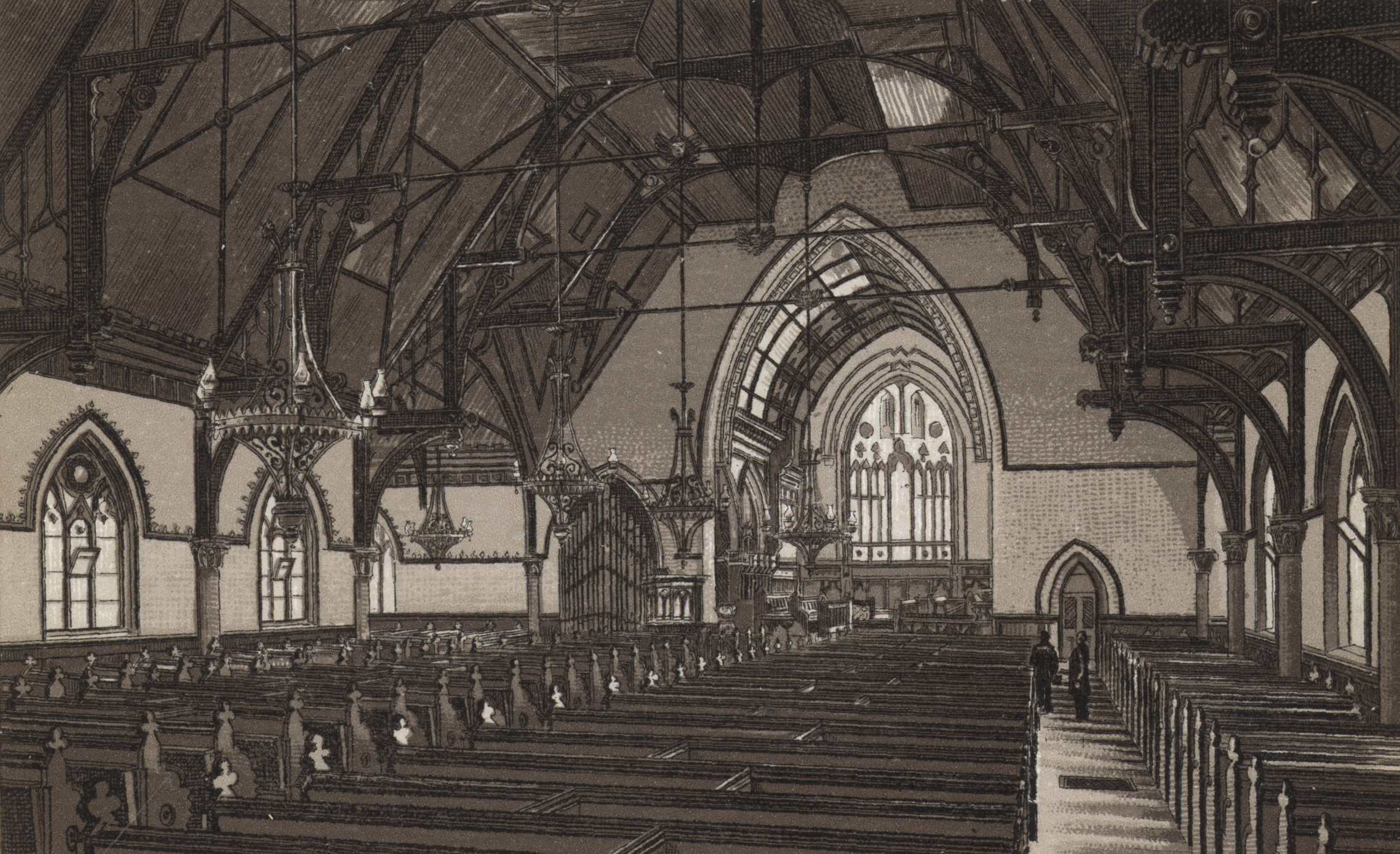
The interior of the church, looking toward the chancel, sketched c. 1889

The church is laid out in an irregular cruciform outline. Instead of a traditional clerestory, Wheeler designed a row of high dormer stained-glass windows in the roof in addition to larger windows along the walls. Each clerestory window features trefoil tracery symbolising the Trinity; tracery is more elaborate in the large west window and the east window in the chancel. The chancel features a segmented, arched wooden ceiling in wood and is separated from the nave by a wooden rood screen. Overall, 26 stained glass windows adorn the church.

At some point, the church's west entrance on Donald Street was sealed, with access then being routed through the adjacent parish hall. By the early 2000s this entrance had been reopened. However, according to the Canadian Directory of Federal Heritage Designations, "[w]ith most of its original layout and furnishings intact, the church interior has a remarkable integrity, which has been supported by a long-term regime of maintenance and care."

The church includes two bronze plaques memorialising members of the Fort Garry Horse who died during World Wars I and II, as well as plaques honouring other parishioners who died in combat during the wars. Music is provided by a four manual pipe organ from the Canadian Pipe Organ Company with more than 4,000 pipes and 67 stops. An earlier instrument was two-manual, 24-stop organ from S. R. Warren & Son installed in 1878 and enlarged when the church was opened in 1884.

=== Incomplete bell tower ===
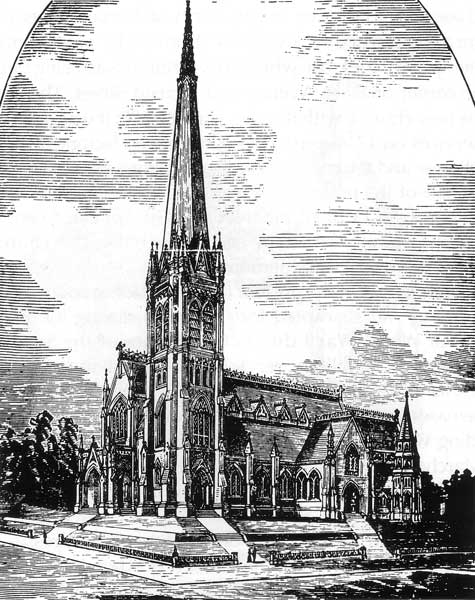
Wheeler's original design 1883 design for Holy Trinity included a 56.7-meter bell tower that was never completed.

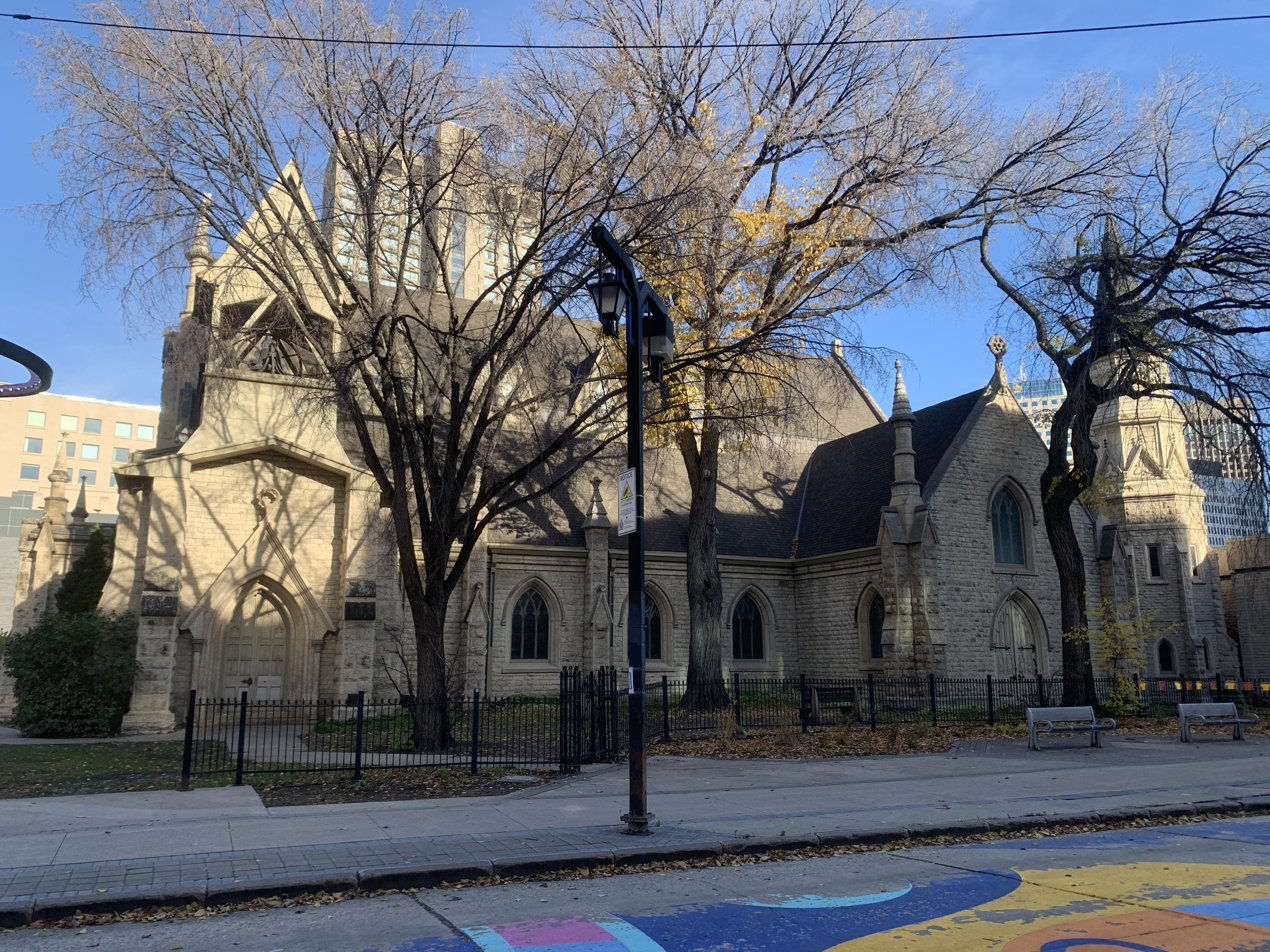
The church's south side with belfry on left

Wheeler's original plans called for a 56.7 metres (186 ft) bell tower that was not completed due to lack of funds. A smaller belfry was built where the tower was planned, and a 706 kilograms (1,556 lb) bell was placed there in 1887.

=== Parish hall ===
In the 1890s, the church erected a two-storey parish hall that blocked the east window at the rear of the chancel. A future extension provided space for a gymnasium, assembly hall, choir room, offices, Sunday school, library, bookshop and kitchen. In the 1960s, the parish hall was replaced by a modernist one-storey structure that allowed light to enter through the chancel window. Despite the differences in design, the new hall was faced with Tyndall stone to match the 1884 church.

== See also ==
- List of historic places in Winnipeg
- List of National Historic Sites of Canada in Manitoba
- St. Boniface Cathedral
- Westminster United Church
