= BC Report =

Canadian newsmagazine (1989–2003)

BC Report (ISSN 0847-2998, later ISSN 1486-4959) was a newsmagazine published in British Columbia, Canada, that was noted for its right-wing or conservative editorial stance. BC Report was published by the producers of the comparable Alberta Report and Western Report magazines, and its first editor-in-chief was Alberta Report founder Ted Byfield.

First published in 1989, BC Report became noted for controversial cover photos, and provocative editorials by regular columnists such as Ted Byfield and Link Byfield.

During the government of British Columbia Premier Glen Clark, the magazine came under fire for a cover story which featured a satirical photo of the Premier dressed as a beggar with the title "The Next Have Not Province?"

BC Report was noted for hosting a number of outspoken columnists such as libertarian economist Walter Block, talk show host Rafe Mair and constitutional lawyer Mel Smith. Mair and Smith made their mark through the magazine as prominent opponents of the Charlottetown Accord.

In its first 11 months of publication, the magazine had a shortfall of $1.2 million.

As of 1999, its circulation was 17,000. Its final edition was published in October 1999, when BC Report joined its two sister publications in a new national newsmagazine called The Report, which was catalogued by the National Library of Canada as Report Newsmagazine, ISSN 1488-8092 (Alberta edition), ISSN 1488-8106 (British Columbia edition), ISSN 1488-8084 (national edition). Terry O'Neill, the editor in chief of BC Report, went to work at the new publication as associate editor and B.C. bureau chief.

This reorganization failed to stem the flagging sales of the publication, and The Report ceased publication in June 2003.

The Western Standard, ISSN 1710-1026, was launched in March 2004 by lawyer and former Reform Party and Canadian Alliance activist Ezra Levant as a sequel publication to the Alberta Report, employing some of the writers and staff from the prior publication.
