= Alberta Report =

Canadian newsmagazine (1973–2003)

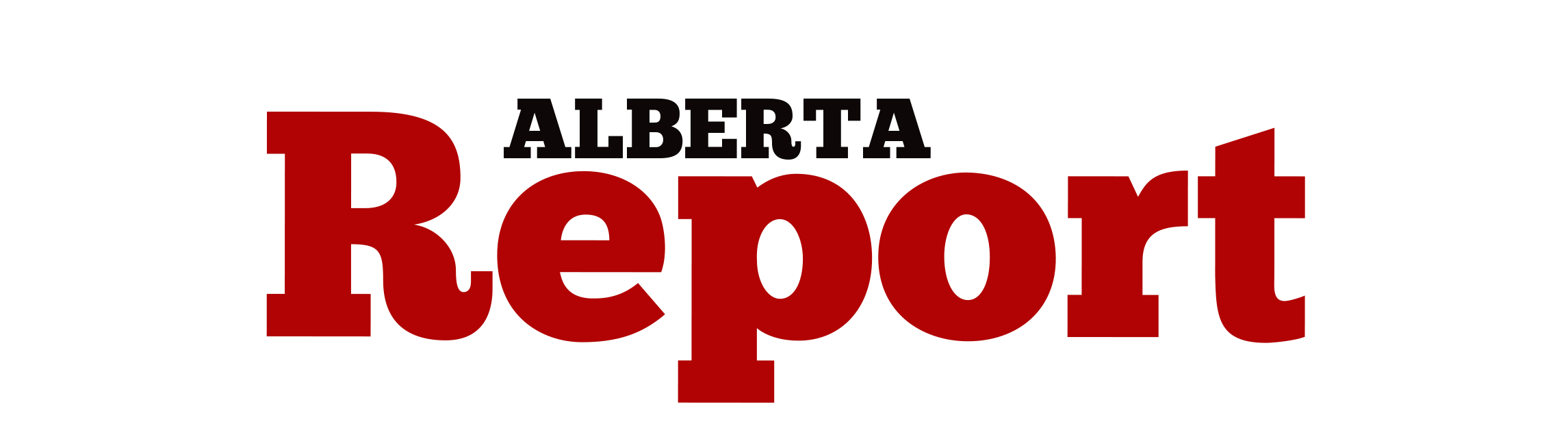
- News Editor: Dave Naylor
- Opinion Editor: Nigel Hannaford
- Publisher: Derek Fildebrandt
- Founder: Ted Byfield
- First issue: 1973; 53 years ago
- Final issue: 2003; 23 years ago
- Website: albertareport.com

The Alberta Report was a conservative weekly newsmagazine based in Edmonton. It was founded and edited by Ted Byfield, and later run by his son, Link Byfield. It ceased publication in 2003.

Promoting his own successor publication in 2004, Ezra Levant described the Report as having been the only general interest magazine in Western Canada covering the news from a conservative perspective.

In 2022, the Alberta Report was returned as an online publication under the ownership of Western Standard New Media Corp.

== History and profile ==
In 1973, Byfield returned to journalism by publishing the St. John's Edmonton Report, a local paper, as part of the operations of the Company of the Cross, a lay Anglican religious order, also co-founded by Byfield, which included a series of traditional Anglican private boarding schools for boys, starting with the Saint John's Cathedral Boys' School in 1957. The minister of St. John's School, Keith T. Bennett, served on the original editorial board. In the early years the school and the magazine operated under the same system where staff lived in a communal apartment block and everyone worked for a dollar a day plus room and board.

The St. John's Edmonton Report combined Byfield's interest in journalism and current affairs with his desire to use media to education others about Christian values. It provided a space for Byfield to comment on "homosexuals, abortionists, human rights commissions and public education" which he strongly opposed. Prior to the establishment of the Alberta Report in 1979, Byfield also launched the St. John's Calgary Report in 1977. When the two magazines were merged into the Alberta Report, Byfield shifted the business model from that of the lay order to a more commercial enterprise to attract a higher quality of journalists.

The emergence of the Alberta Report coincided with Alberta's energy wars with the federal government. Byfield's Report provided the voice for Western Canada's growing sense of discontent and alienation in the 1970s and 1980s. In response to the province of Quebec's call for separation, Byfield wrote about "western separatism". The magazine became so popular in Alberta that the circulation reached a record average of 53,277 a week by 1987. In the late 1980s as the economy of Alberta declined, so did the circulation. In 1990 a group of Calgary oil magnates offered to buy the report in an effort to provide financial stability to a journal they regarded as politically congenial.

The magazine was published for a time in three separate editions, the Alberta Report, BC Report, and Western Report. These were merged in 1999 into The Report, later known as the Citizens Centre Report in connection with Link Byfield's successor organization, the Citizens Centre for Freedom and Democracy.

The magazine often struggled financially, with the senior Byfield mortgaging his own house four times to keep it afloat. It shut down in June 2003. According to the Edmonton Sun, some employees were still owed back pay nearly six months later, and complained when the Citizens Centre was directing money toward its political agenda.

A number of right-wing journalists and commentators in Canada who are prominent today began their careers writing for The Report magazines, including Kenneth Whyte, the editor in chief of Maclean's; Colby Cosh of the National Post, Kevin Michael Grace, Lorne Gunter, Ezra Levant, Brian Mulawka, and Kevin Steel. Other former staff include: freelance journalist Ric Dolphin, former National Post writer Dunnery Best, U.S. food writer (and founding editor of Equinox magazine) Barry Estabrook, former Profit editor and publisher Rick Spence, author D'Arcy Jenish, and Paul Bunner, who in 2006 became a speechwriter for Prime Minister Stephen Harper and later for Alberta Premier Jason Kenney. C.P. (Chris) Champion started The Dorchester Review, a small but influential history magazine, in 2011, and in 2020 served as a curriculum advisor under Minister of Education, Andrea LaGrange. Canadian Conservative leader Pierre Poilievre also contributed to the Alberta Report.

The Western Standard, launched in 2004, by Levant with the participation of several other Report alumni, aimed to fill the space in the market that had been held by the Report. The Standard ceased publication in 2007, but returned as an online daily news publication in 2019.

In 2022, Alberta Report was acquired by Western Standard New Media Corp., returning it to publication online.

== Topics ==
In the 1990s, AR produced a number of articles expressing opposition to a possible amendment to the Canadian Human Rights Act (CHRA) that would prohibit discrimination against homosexuals.

In the wake of the successful lawsuit against the government of Alberta for wrongful sterilization, launched by Leilani Muir, and the subsequent 1995 trial on eugenics, the weekly magazine published five articles on eugenics from 1995 and 1999. The articles covered the court case, placing it into an historical context. A 1995 article by Joe Woodward and a 1996 article by Chris Champion investigated the decision by the University of Alberta to remove the name of the John M. MacEachran (1877 – 1971)—co-founder of the Canadian Psychological Association and the Alberta Eugenics Board's chairman responsible for the forced sterilizations—from several scholarships and a library at the university.
