= Company of the Cross =

The Company of the Cross was a lay religious order which was affiliated with the Anglican Church of Canada when founded in 1957 by Frank Wiens and Ted Byfield. For many years, the Company operated under the authority of the Anglican bishops in Winnipeg (diocese of Rupert's Land), the diocese of Edmonton and the diocese of Toronto On November 17, 1990, the Company of the Cross was unincorporated in Manitoba.

== Overview ==
It was founded in 1962 by Frank Wiens and Ted Byfield who later also published magazines, and was originally named the Dynevor Society after Baron Dynevor and the historical St. Peter's Dynevor Anglican diocese. The name Company of the Cross came from Byfield's reading of C.S. Lewis.

Individual members of the Company of the Cross in Alberta still meet and renew their vows.

=== St. John's traditional private Anglican schools for boys ===
It ran three boys' boarding schools: Saint John's School of Alberta near Stony Plain, Alberta (closed in 2008), Saint John's School of Ontario (closed in 1989) and Saint John's Cathedral Boys' School (closed in 1990).

The religious and social viewpoints of the Company of the Cross were conservative. Its principles and ideas have been controversial. Although few investigations or lawsuits resulted in claims being against these private schools, a January 19, 1990 child welfare investigation undertaken by Ted Shaw, then manager of the Leduc District Office, described in detail the punishments that were meted out on students by staff at St. John's Anglican School in response to an "abusive discipline complaint."

In an October 21, 1996 Alberta Report article, Byfield wrote that the most traditional of all St. John's schools' rules, was discipline. In his articles, Byfield described his belief in the use of discipline to strengthen the character of his students by pushing them to their psychological breaking points. Byfield described how was enforced "with a flat stick across the seat of the pants -- failure to complete assignment, four swats; late for a work detail, three swats; caught smoking, six swats." He admitted that such punishment was "barbarous" in comparison with "what would follow over the next three decades" but it was "unremarkable" when "compared with what had gone before, over the previous two to three millennia of human history." In a 1990s CBC radio's Tapestry interview with Don Hill, Ted Byfield, a co-founder of St. John's, said standards for disciplining students had changed, and that he would have been arrested in the 1990s" for the "harsh discipline...meted out to children" in the 1970s in their schools. By 1998, Byfield's columns had attracted the attention of Alberta Human Rights. There were lawsuits regarding abuse of students at its schools, and improper preparation for arduous wilderness excursions.

In his February 8, 2003 Calgary Herald article, Daryl Slade reported on a 2003 lawsuit by a former Saint John's Cathedral Boys' School student, who said that his life was put at risk in 1976, when he was forced to undertake "100-kilometre hike through steep mountain passes and a 500-kilometre canoe trip through some of the most treacherous parts of the North Saskatchewan River" for which the 13-year old was "untrained, unprepared and unsuitable", according to the defendant's Calgary-based lawyer, Vaughn Marshall. A year later, a child died at the same school while on a lengthy snowshoe march.

The next year, in 1978, at Saint John's School of Ontario—also operated by the Company of the Cross—twelve boys and one teacher from its Saint John's School of Ontario died while canoeing on Lake Temiskaming. While the coroner's inquest ruled it was an accident and no charges were laid, the coroner's report said, "We feel that for boys from 12 to 14 years of age, this entire expedition constituted an exaggerated and pointless challenge." Two books were written describing the accident and The New York Times and The Washington Post covered the story. In a May 26, 2002 statement, a former student of the school who survived the accident, described the canoe trip undertaken by 27 boys and 4 leaders. It was meant to be a three-week trip to re-trace the journey of Pierre de Troyes, Chevalier de Troyes, a 17th-century French explorer who canoed along Lake Timiskaming on the Quebec-Ontario border to James Bay.

While the schools have been criticized for their harsh conditions and discipline, some of the former students and parents appreciated the character building and the outdoor experience, the St. John's schools offered.

By 2008 the last school that remained open had self-described as nondenominational implying that it was no longer operating under the auspices of an Anglican bishop and it was no longer affiliated with the Anglican Church of Canada.

== Publications ==
The Company of the Cross also operated St. John's Edmonton Report in the 1970s with the staff of both the school and the paper living as lay members of the religious community. Originally, the staff of the schools and the magazine were paid $1.00 per day, plus living expenses. This changed in the 1970s, when the Byfields renamed the paper the Alberta Report, shifting the management style to that of a commercial magazine paper, and began to pay the magazine staff regular wages. The Alberta Report increased circulation and became influential in the province reaching a peak in the mid-1980s. Its circulation declined from the late 1980s onward and Ted Byfield began publishing a series of history books with United Western Publishers, which has been also referred to legally as the Alberta Report/United Western Publishers. The Report discontinued operations in 2003. The Alberta Report was also referred to legally as the United Western Publishers through which Byfield published a series of books. Originally, the staff of the schools and the magazine were paid $1.00 per day, plus living expenses. Its formal operation of the Company of the Cross, which included publishing magazines as well as running schools ended.
