= Octave Fortin =

The Ven Octave Fortin (b Iberville, Quebec, 5 January 1842; d Santa Monica 2 October 1927) was a French convert to Anglicanism who rose to become Archdeacon of Winnipeg from 1888 to 1917.

He was educated at Bishop's University, Lennoxville; and ordained in 1866. After a curacy in Sorel he was the incumbent at St Jude, Montreal from 1869 to 1872, and then of Trinity Church, Montreal until 1875. He then began a 45-year association with Holy Trinity, Winnipeg.
