= Ted Byfield =

Canadian journalist and publisher (1928–2021)

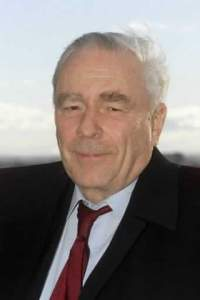
- Byfield in 2001
- Born: Edward Bartlett Byfield; 10 July 1928; Toronto, Ontario, Canada
- Died: 23 December 2021 (aged 93); Edmonton, Alberta, Canada
- Occupations: Teacher; Journalist; Historian; Publisher
- Known for: Christian principles, Western Canadian interests, Conservatism, educational reform
- Notable work: Alberta Report
- Spouse: Virginia Nairn (m. 1949; died 2014)
- Children: 6, including Link Byfield
- Website: tedbyfield.wordpress.com

Edward Bartlett Byfield (10 July 1928 – 23 December 2021) was a Canadian teacher, journalist, historian, and publisher. He co-founded Saint John's Cathedral Boys' School and Saint John's School of Alberta, started the Alberta Report, BC Report and Western Report newsmagazines, and published two 12-volume history book series, Alberta In the 20th Century and The Christians: Their First Two Thousand Years.

== Early life and career ==
Edward Bartlett Byfield was born into a Unitarian family in Toronto, Ontario, in 1928 as the son of Caroline (née Gillett) and Vernon "Vern" Byfield, a reporter for the Toronto Telegram and Toronto Star. During WW2 Byfield attended Lakefield College School for two "unforgettable years. The place established the first positive values of my life--moral, mathematical, literary--and introduced me to the Christian faith." Byfield then moved with his parents to Washington, D.C. in 1945 at the age of 17.

He began his journalism career as a copy boy for the Washington Post. He returned to Canada in 1948 and worked at the Ottawa Journal and Timmins Daily Press and married Virginia Byfield. In 1952, the Byfields moved from Toronto with their two children under two, to Winnipeg where Ted Byfield began working at the Winnipeg Free Press. Covering Winnipeg city hall news, he once "crawled into an air conditioning duct in order to eavesdrop on a secret city council meeting enabling him to get a scoop on a funding scandal".

=== Byfield role in Winnipeg election upset ===
While a political reporter for the Winnipeg Free Press Byfield was enlisted by recently elected MLA Stephen Juba in a bid for mayor. Juba's win was "the upset of the decade in Winnipeg municipal politics. Once his man was in power Ted made great use of his favored status. In particular, he enlisted the mayor’s support for a personal project he had just begun – a weekend boys’ club. The effect, of course, was to give the project instant credibility. But more importantly, it got the kind of publicity no money could buy."

== Religious conversion and founding of "one of the most demanding outdoor schools in North America" ==
=== Company of the Cross ===
In 1952, Ted Byfield underwent a profound religious conversion. Inspired by the writings of Christian apologists, such as Dorothy L. Sayers, C.S. Lewis, and G. K. Chesterton, the couple committed to living their Christian faith fully. Through the St. John's Cathedral choir, Ted Byfield became part of a cell or group of seventeen men, which included Frank Wiens, that shared similar beliefs. They founded what they first called the Dynevor Society, and later the Company of the Cross, a lay Anglican order affiliated with the Anglican Church of Canada. The boy's choir at St. John's Cathedral became a club, then a weekend residential school starting in 1957, and finally, in 1962, a full-time "traditionalist" Anglican private boarding school for boys. The Company of the Cross had acquired the abandoned Dynevor Indian Hospital in Selkirk, north of Winnipeg where they held their weekend schools. The cell officially changed their name from Dynevor to the Company of the Cross under the Manitoba Societies Act.

=== St. John's Cathedral Boys' School ===
In 1962, Byfield and five other members of the Company opened the first in a series of St. John's full-time boarding schools for boys "dedicated to the reassertion of Christian educational principles"—Saint John's Cathedral Boys' School. The school operated intentionally on "traditional" methods. They used mathematics textbooks from pre-World War II advancing from "arithmetic to calculus" with constant testing. Ginger Byfield taught French "developed from French-Canadian history." They watched hockey on the French channel. Byfield taught history which required that students read copiously from Thomas Costain to Francis Parkman. In 1973 parents were paying $1700 a year tuition.

==== Rationale for a rigorous outdoor program ====
"Without real challenge and real adventure," said Byfield in a 1968 CBC TV documentary on why the school promoted such a challenging physical education program, "we will never produce real men."

===== St. John's canoe trips =====
A 1974 National Film Board documentary described the St. John's Cathedral Boys' School as "one of the most demanding outdoor schools in North America." Upon arrival at the school, the new boys, 13- to 15-years old, undertook a 2-week canoe on the English River (Ontario) from Ear Falls to Lake Winnipeg. In the spring there is a second longer canoe trip starting from Grand Portage to the school covering 900 miles (1,440 kilometers) with 55 portages. "The boys stand up to it (the New Boy canoe trip) according to the individual boy," said Byfield, "and this is a very difficult thing to determine. For instance, we have eminent success with youngsters who are physically ill-coordinated. For the youngster who has never succeeded in anything physically, often this causes them to have terrible inhibitions and fears. If they go through a canoe trip, when they get back they've done something, and this does enormous things for their confidence."

===== St. John's snowshoe runs =====
By spring, most senior students will have travelled at least 300 miles (or 500 kilometers) on snowshoes. Each week every boy will spend his Wednesdays snowshoeing significant distances, the seniors covering about 30 miles (50km), intermediates about 23 (37km), and juniors 15 (24km). "We find that of all the programs that the school operates this one is almost without doubt the most effective," asserts Byfield, "because on that snowshoe team the boy, while he's a member of a group, is entirely dependent on his own resources. He has two legs, and those are the two legs that are going to carry him. In no sense can he lean on anybody else's legs."

=== St. John's School of Alberta ===
In order to open a second school—Saint John's School of Alberta—the Byfields moved to Edmonton. The new school property, which was thirty kilometres west of Edmonton, near Stony Plain, Alberta, had "110 hectares of bush, park and farmland". At first, their schools operated under the auspices of an Anglican bishop. The school practiced corporal punishment, and was eventually sued by an ex-student, Jeffrey Richard Birkin, who alleged that he was "forcefully exposed to experiences on the trip that put his life, health and safety at risk."

By 2003, the school had about 130 students and 30 staff members. It remained open until 2008. In the school's early years, Ted Byfield taught history and Virginia (Ginger) Byfield taught "French, English grammar and literature." A third Company of the Cross school —Saint John's School of Ontario—was established at Claremont, Ontario in 1977 and closed in 1989. It was from this school that one of Canada's greatest boating tragedies occurred. Twelve boys and a staff member died of drowning and hypothermia on a canoe trip on 11 June 1978 on Lake Temiskaming.

In an Alberta Report 21 October 1996 article, Byfield denounced "new-found" ideas on educating boys. By 1996, SJCS graduates were staff members at the St. John's School of Alberta near Warburg, Alberta, where its program is evolved from the "Manitoba endeavour."

In the early years, all employees of the Company of the Cross—which included school and magazine staff, earned a dollar per day, plus room and board. The St. John's Edmonton Report news magazine staff lived in communal fashion entirely occupying a three-story walk-up apartment block on 149 Street and 91st Avenue in Edmonton, called "Waverly Place," where they "attended morning and evening chapel services."

== The Report news magazines (1973–2003) ==
=== St. John's Edmonton Report ===
In 1973, along with about a dozen St. John's Alberta school staff, Byfield first began publishing St. John's Edmonton Report from a new building extension of the Genesee, Alberta school. This provided Byfield with the means to "combine his love of the news business with his desire to proselytize." He used the Report to "rail against homosexuals, abortionists, human rights commissions and public education." This was the precursor of the Alberta Report. In 1977, they launched the St. John's Calgary Report. In 1979 they merged the Edmonton and Calgary Reports into the Alberta Report.

=== Alberta Report Newsmagazine ===
The earlier model of The Company of the Cross, which included communal living and a meagre salary was not a successful business model. With the formation of the Alberta Report, Byfield shifted to a commercial enterprise model with staff receiving regular wages. It was during that time that Alberta and the federal government entered into their "energy wars." Byfield took on the role as the "guru of regional discontent" and his magazines fed a growing sentiment of Western Canadian discontent and alienation. He dared suggest "western separatism", emulating the province of Quebec's threats. By 1987, the Report's circulation in Alberta reached a record average of 53,277 a week. They attempted to establish Western Report as a regional Western Canadian version, but this wasn't succeeding, so they confined Western Report to Saskatchewan and Manitoba and launched a new provincial news magazine for British Columbia.

==== Postal strikes and Byfield's "not a postage stamp" postage stamp ====
Byfield's newsmagazine had an Achilles heal, in that it depended on getting its magazines delivered every week by Canada Post. However, by "the summer of 1981, the unionized workers at Canada Post walked off the job for the fourth time in seven years... Never one to accept failure, Byfield quickly came up with a response: the Alberta Report Postal Emergency Service. Delivery boys were recruited from local Catholic schools..." Because Canada Post held a monopoly on postal services, Byfield loudly declared on his own specially designed stamp, "René Magritte-style, 'This is not a postage stamp,' and featured a pattern of tiny one-fingered salutes, presumably aimed at Liberal Prime Minister Pierre Trudeau."

==== AR newsroom in the nineties a potpourri of political viewpoints ====
Often criticized as a bastion of rednecks, the editorial staff of Alberta Report was in reality composed of writers and editors who were often not Christian and not conservative, including a young left-leaning Jewish writer (now Canadian senator) Paula Simons who has jokingly referred to herself as Ted's illegitimate daughter. According to Calgary Sun columnist Rick Bell, "the Alberta Report newsroom was not buttoned-down. You’d see folks of all political stripes and all persuasions and all lifestyles including a copy-editing, chain-smoking Maoist."

=== BC Report Newsmagazine ===
They used the B.C. portion of the Western Report list to start British Columbia Report in 1989, while simultaneously launching an $1.1-million initial public offering on the Vancouver Stock Exchange in 1990. In addition to covering news from a conservative viewpoint, the Report magazines challenged the prevailing news and commentary about crime, homosexuality, abortion, and public education. In a 20 December 1993 article Byfield wrote that, "We do not think government is a good thing. We do not believe government on anything like the present scale is even a necessary thing. We believe government, or what it has turned into, to be an actively evil thing."

He advocated that the Senate of Canada be reformed to what he termed a Triple-E (elected, equal, and effective) chamber of parliament.

Byfield's son, Link Byfield, succeeded him as editor and publisher. The Alberta Report's circulation never again reached the peak it reached in the mid-1980s and continued to decline. Vincent Byfield, who had worked at the magazines from the start as a boy at age eight in 1973 and went on to manage B.C. Report in 1989, left in 1996. In 1997 all remaining subscribers were consolidated. Vincent later became a member of the UCP board of directors, serving as Edmonton Director.

On January 26, 1998, an article on residential school denialism, entitled "Canada's Mythical Holocaust" was published in Byfield's Alberta Report, saying that "many teachers and graduates" were "still proud of the schools and the services they provided" through the Canadian Indian residential school system. The article blamed "white liberal guilt about cultural assimilation, on the transformation of residential schools "into symbols of shame.". The Indian Residential Schools Settlement Agreement (IRSSA) recognized the damage inflicted by the residential schools. The 2006 IRSSA's C$1.9-billion compensation package for all former IRS students, was the largest class action settlement in Canadian history.

In 2003, "Alberta Report" ceased publication.

== Books ==
Ted Byfield has written a number of books beginning in 1965 with Just Think Mr. Berton. In 1983 a collection of Byfield columns was published as The Deplorable Unrest in the Colonies. In 1984, frustrated with inaccurate existing roadmaps, Byfield assembled the Atlas of Alberta, a 160-page hardbound compilation of both historical and modern highway and city maps, including every urban center in the province with a population of 5,000 or more.

In his 1998 The Book of Ted, Epistles from an Unrepentant Redneck, he published a collection of his "back-page" Alberta Report articles, where he championed "balanced budgets, back-to-basics education and tougher sentences for young criminals".

=== Alberta in the 20th Century 12-volume history book series ===
Starting in the early 1990s, Byfield published a series of twelve volumes on the history of Alberta entitled Alberta in the 20th Century: A Journalistic History of the Province. United Western Communications (which owned Alberta Report) began publishing the history book series in 1991 and the series was completed in 2003. Chapters in the first volumes included contributions by Paul Bunner and Paul Stanway, who both played key roles in completing the final volumes. For Alberta's centennial anniversary in 2005, Canwest Media published with Paul Stanway a single-volume compendium of the complete series entitled Alberta in the 20th Century a Journalistic History of the Province - the Albertans: from Settlement to Super Province 1905 -2005.

In 2020, Chris P. Champion, social studies curriculum advisor to the Alberta Education Minister, Andriana LaGrange, strongly supported the inclusion of Byfield's history series as required reading for Grade 11 social studies, calling it a "comprehensive analytic narrative of the Province in the context of historians' debates and Canadian and world history". Champion said that these volumes would "increase students' knowledge of the past and provide counterbalance to the prevailing, politicizing social justice tendency that has already gone too far."

=== The Christians: Their First Two Thousand Years 12-volume history book series ===
In 1999, Byfield planned on starting a "40-volume book series on the history of Christianity." Their first volume, The Veil Is Torn A.D. 30 to A.D. 70 Pentecost to the Destruction of Jerusalem, was published in 2002. By 2005, the Christian History Project had already invested $3.5-million and sales of the first volumes were slow. In order to raise funds to complete the series, Byfield created the Society to Explore and Record Christian History (SEARCH) as charities, with one in Alberta and the other in Virginia. They raised enough in donations to complete the series. Byfield completed the final 12th volume ("The High Tide and the Turn / AD 1914 to AD 2001 / A New Christendom Explodes into Life in the Third World") in 2013 through the Society to Explore and Record Christian History.

In 2013, with The Christians completed, Byfield turned his focus to increasing the influence of SEARCH by introducing an online journal with current interest topics. Byfield served as president and chairman of SEARCH from 2007 until his death in 2021, whereupon his son Vincent, who had managed SEARCH since 2011, took over.

== Conversion to Orthodox Church in America ==
Following the September 11 attacks, Ted and Virginia Byfield left the Anglican church, which had adopted a "modernistic theology" that the Byfield's considered to be "simply heretical." They converted to the Orthodox Church in America, a stricter form of Christianity. They were motivated to convert by the 11 September attacks, and a "sense of a growing conflict between Christianity and Islam." This concern also inspired them to work on a history of Christianity.

== Political engagement ==
Byfield was one of the inspirations behind the founding of the Reform Party of Canada, was the keynote speaker at their inaugural meeting of the Reform Party in Winnipeg and coined the phrase "The West Wants In."

In a 1999 review of 'Byfield's 1998 publication, The Book of Ted, Epistles from an Unrepentant Redneck, said that the role of Ted Byfield—and by extension, the Alberta Review—in the creation of the Reform Party was similar to William F. Buckley and the National Review—"before there was Ronald Reagan there was Barry Goldwater, before there was Goldwater there was National Review, and before there was National Review there was William F. Buckley."

== Awards ==
Ted Byfield won Canada's National Newspaper Award in 1957 for Breaking News (formerly Spot News Reporting).

On 19 October 2017, Betty Unger, Senator of Canada from Alberta, who was appointed in 2012 by then-Prime Minister Stephen Harper, awarded Byfield, along with thirteen other Albertans, a Senate 150th Commemorative Medal for significant contributions to his community. Other recipients included Ralph Sorenson, who served in the Legislative Assembly of Alberta as a member of the Social Credit caucus in the official opposition from 1971 to 1975.

== Personal life and death ==
Byfield and his wife Virginia (born 1929), who predeceased him in 2014, had six children, two of whom, Philippa and Link, predeceased their father. Ted Byfield died at his home on 23 December 2021, at the age of 93.

== In popular culture ==
The fictional journalist, Dick Bennington in Frank Moher's 1988 play Prairie Report, is widely considered to be based on Ted Byfield.
