= Naboth Manzongo =

Canadian Anglican bishop (born 1980s)

The Right Reverend Naboth Manzongo
- Bishop of Rupert's Land
- Church: Anglican Church of Canada
- Province: Northern Lights
- Diocese: Rupert's Land
- Elected: 31 May 2025
- In office: 2025–present
- Predecessor: Geoffrey Woodcroft
- Previous posts: Incumbent, Holy Trinity Anglican Church, Winnipeg

Orders
- Ordination: 27 September 2008 (diaconate); 7 March 2009 (priesthood) by Sebastian Bakare
- Consecration: 13 September 2025 by Greg Kerr-Wilson

Personal details
- Born: 1984 or 1985 (age 41–42) Zimbabwe
- Denomination: Anglicanism
- Spouse: Thelma
- Education: University of Zimbabwe; Bishop Gaul Theological College; Nashotah House

Naboth Manzongo (born 1984 or 1985) is a Zimbabwean-born Canadian Anglican bishop. Since 2025, he has been the 14th bishop of the Diocese of Rupert's Land in the Anglican Church of Canada. First ordained as a priest in the Church of the Province of Central Africa, Manzongo migrated to Canada in 2018. Prior to his election as bishop, he was incumbent at Holy Trinity Anglican Church in Winnipeg.

== Early life and call to ministry ==
Manzongo experienced a call to ministry at young age. He attended an Anglican school in which the routine was to pray the Daily Office; he was an altar server and eventually a lay reader in his secondary school years. By the time he completed secondary school, he was known to the bishop and being encouraged to pursue ordination.

He received his BA and a master's degree from the University of Zimbabwe. Manzongo was ordained as a deacon in 2008 and as a priest in 2009 in the Anglican Diocese of Harare.

== Ordained ministry ==
Manzongo began his ministry at Church of St. Mary Magdalene, Harare, and then was rector of St. Joseph's, Dzivarasekwa. During this time, in 2012—following a Supreme Court of Zimbabwe decision that Bishop Nolbert Kunonga had to vacate properties of the Central African province he sought to take with him out of the church—Manzongo was injured in a clash during an eviction of a Kunonga-aligned priest.

Manzongo relocated to Wisconsin in 2015 to complete a degree at Nashotah House. During this time, he was a supply priest for the Episcopal Diocese of Eau Claire. He returned briefly to Harare to serve as rector of St. Paul's Church before migrating to Canada to accept the post of incumbent at St. Luke's Anglican Church in Dryden, Ontario. After moving to Canada on a work permit, he did not see his wife and then two children back in Zimbabwe for three years due to COVID-19-related processing delays in his permanent residency application.

In 2024, Manzongo became incumbent of the 140-year-old Holy Trinity Anglican Church in downtown Winnipeg. At the time, the historic church was physically deteriorating and at risk of structural collapse. In April 2025, Holy Trinity and the diocese signed a memorandum with the downtown development agency and an architectural firm to support the church's restoration, beginning with a rehabilitation study that focuses on designing a new foundation for the troubled structure.

In May 2025, Manzongo was elected bishop of Rupert's Land. He was consecrated and installed at the Cathedral of St. John in September 2025.

== Personal life ==
Manzongo is married to Thelma Manzongo. They have three children.

Anglican Communion titles
Preceded by Geoffrey Woodcroft	Bishop of Rupert's Land; 2025–present	Incumbent
