= Western Standard =

Canadian media website

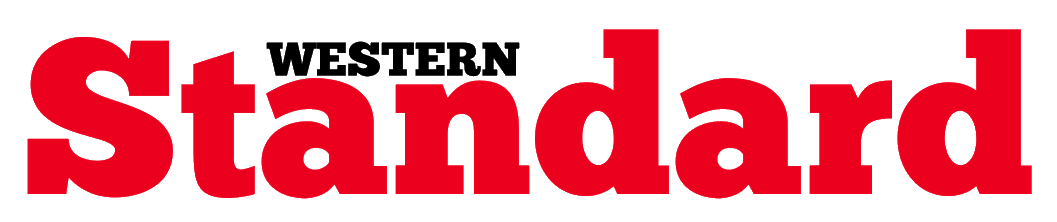
- Website type: Politics
- Available in: Canadian English
- Headquarters: Calgary, Alberta
- Founder: Derek Fildebrandt (President)
- Editor: Dave Naylor
- Website: WesternStandard.news
- Commercial: Yes

The Western Standard is a Canadian conservative social commentary media website operated by Western Standard New Media Corp. Its president is Derek Fildebrandt. The Standard is based in Calgary, Alberta, where its main offices are located. The Standard also has bureaus in Victoria, Vancouver, Edmonton, Regina, Winnipeg and Ottawa.

Fildebrandt is the majority shareholder. Dave Naylor, a former city editor with the Calgary Sun, joined as news editor and a minority shareholder. (Note: Not to be confused with Dave Naylor the Canadian sports journalist.) All of the company's shareholders reside in Alberta.

The Standard's revenue is generated through subscriptions and advertising.

== History ==
Ezra Levant co-founded the Western Standard, in 2004 as an Alberta-based magazine with an emphasis on Western Canada and political conservatism. Levant later sold the publication's remaining assets to Matthew Johnson, the former legislative aide to former Conservative Party MP Rahim Jaffer. In October 2007, the magazine ceased publication of its print edition after failing to become profitable. It existed briefly as an online magazine, which quickly became stagnant.

On 23 October 2019, Derek Fildebrandt bought the rights to the magazine from Johnston and relaunched it as a conservative commentary and news website. Johnston, a former conservative Albertan politician, occasionally contributes columns to the relaunched site. In 2021, the Western Standard announced that it had opened bureaus in Victoria, Vancouver, Regina, Winnipeg, and Edmonton. As of March 2023, the Victoria and Winnipeg bureaus do not have any staff, although there is a columnist based in Winnipeg.

The Western Standard obtained "Qualified Canadian Journalism Organization" status with the Canada Revenue Agency in 2022, permitting it to apply for government news subsidies. Fildebrandt has opposed government funding or grants for Canadian media organizations. He wrote in a column the organization applied for QCJO status "just for fun." While a QCJO, as of March 2023 The Western Standard does not appear on the CRA's list of media outlets receiving grants, thus making subscribers ineligible to apply for the associated tax credit.

== Controversies ==
=== Publication of Jyllands-Posten Muhammad cartoons ===
On 13 February 2006, the Western Standard published the Jyllands-Posten Muhammad cartoons depicting unflattering images of Muhammad. Syed Soharwardy, a Calgary Imam and president of the Islamic Supreme Council of Canada, complained about the publication to the Alberta Human Rights and Citizenship Commission.

On 21 December 2007, Johnston apologized directly to Soharwardy and Canada's Muslim community for the publication of the cartoons and Soharwardy withdrew his complaint against the magazine.

Levant refused to apologize and a hearing was scheduled for January 2008. On the day of the hearing, Levant republished the cartoons on his personal website. At the request of Levant and his lawyers, Levant was allowed to videotape his interview with Shirlene McGovern, a human rights investigator with the Alberta Human Rights Commission. Levant later posted the videos on YouTube.

On 15 February 2008, Soharwardy announced he was withdrawing his complaint against Levant. He said in a guest column for The Globe and Mail that publishing the cartoons "was irresponsible and was intended to cause strife," but acknowledged their publication "may not fall outside the limits of free speech." In August 2008, the Alberta Human Rights and Citizenship Commission rejected a similar complaint against Levant made by the Edmonton Council of Muslim Communities.

=== Retraction of restaurant and social gathering story ===
On 9 June 2021, the Western Standard reported that Alberta Premier Jason Kenney, Minister of Environment and Parks Jason Nixon and Minister of Health Tyler Shandro had been regularly ignoring their own COVID-19 restrictions since the start of 2021. The reporting relied on sources that the Western Standard kept anonymous.

The story reported they had arranged for secret social gatherings at Bottega 104, a restaurant in downtown Edmonton. The article also reported that Kenney attended social functions at the private residence of a lobbyist. At the time, COVID-19 protocols in Alberta restricted restaurants to takeout and delivery service, and private gatherings in homes were limited.

Kenney called the story "false and defamatory," and had a cease-and-desist letter sent to Fildebrandt and the Western Standard. Brock Harrison, a spokesperson for the premier's office, wrote on Twitter that the story was "a total fabrication with no basis in fact" and said the Western Standard did not try to get comment from the premier's office. It was later revealed The Western Standard asked for comment at 5:49 p.m. MT, seven minutes before publishing the article.

On 11 June 2021, Fildebrandt said the story "should not have been published" and fully retracted the story in a public apology.

=== Coverage of "Natural Woman" hoax ===
On 23 January 2023, Western Standard reporter Jonathan Bradley published a story titled "Transgender group calls for Aretha Franklin song Natural Woman to be banned." The group making the demand is a satirical group called the Trans Cultural Mindfulness Alliance (TCMA).

Bradley reported that the group wrote on Twitter that (You Make Me Feel Like) A Natural Woman by Aretha Franklin should be banned from Spotify and Apple Music because it inspires "acts of harm against transgender women" and there is "no such thing as a 'natural' woman."

Later that day, a Twitter post from TCMA said the organization was fictional and the media outlets who covered the comments as fact never asked for comment to verify the post. TCMA said their intention was to provide commentary on "woke" culture and "media stupidity."

== See also ==
- Rebel News
- Alberta Report
- The Post Millennial
