= Lorne Gunter =

Canadian journalist

- Occupation: Journalist

Lorne Gunter is a Canadian columnist and editorial board member with the National Post.

== Career ==
Gunter left his job at National Post to work for Sun Media in March 2012. He previously served as the managing editor of the Alberta Report, and as a reporter with the Edmonton Journal

Gunter was raised in Medicine Hat, Alberta and is a graduate of the University of Alberta.
