= Patrick Lee (bishop) =

Canadian Anglican bishop (1931–2010)

Patrick Vaughan Lee (20 June 1931 – 26 September 2010) was a Canadian Anglican bishop.

Lee was educated at the University of Manitoba and ordained in 1956.

Lee ministered at St Mary la Prairie Anglican Church, Portage la Prairie, Manitoba until 1975 when he became Dean of Diocese of Cariboo. In 1984 he was appointed Dean of Training and Education Secretary in the Diocese of Western Uganda. He returned to Winnipeg in 1990, where he was Executive Archdeacon of Rupert’s Land from 1990 to 1994 when he became its diocesan bishop.

In 1999 Lee retired and moved to the Ottawa area. He died in 2010.

Anglican Communion titles
| Preceded by Walter H. Jones | Bishop of Rupert's Land; 1994–1999 | Succeeded by Donald Phillips |
