= Donald Phillips (bishop) =

Canadian Anglican bishop (born c. 1954)

The Right Reverend Donald Phillips
- 12th Bishop of Rupert's Land
- Church: Anglican Church of Canada
- Province: Rupert's Land
- Diocese: Rupert's Land
- Installed: 2000
- Term ended: 2018
- Predecessor: Patrick Lee
- Successor: Geoffrey Woodcroft

Orders
- Ordination: 1981
- Consecration: 2000

Personal details
- Born: Donald David Phillips; 1954 or 1955 (age 71–72) London, Ontario, Canada
- Denomination: Anglicanism
- Education: University of Western Ontario

Donald David Phillips (born 1954 or 1955) is a Canadian Anglican bishop who was the Bishop of Rupert's Land from 2000 until 2018. Phillips was educated at the University of Western Ontario and ordained in 1981. He was at Lac La Biche, Alberta, until 1984 and then priest in charge at St Thomas' Fort McMurray. He also held ministry positions at St Paul's Fort Chipewyan and St Michael and All Angels' Moose Jaw before becoming Ministries Development Co-ordinator in 1992. He was ordained to the episcopate in 2000. His term as diocesan bishop concluded in November 2018.

Anglican Communion titles
Preceded by Patrick Lee	Bishop of Rupert's Land; 2000–2018	Succeeded by Geoffrey Woodcroft
