= Diocese of Rupert's Land =

Diocese of the Anglican Church in Canada

Coordinates: 50.2°N 95.3°W

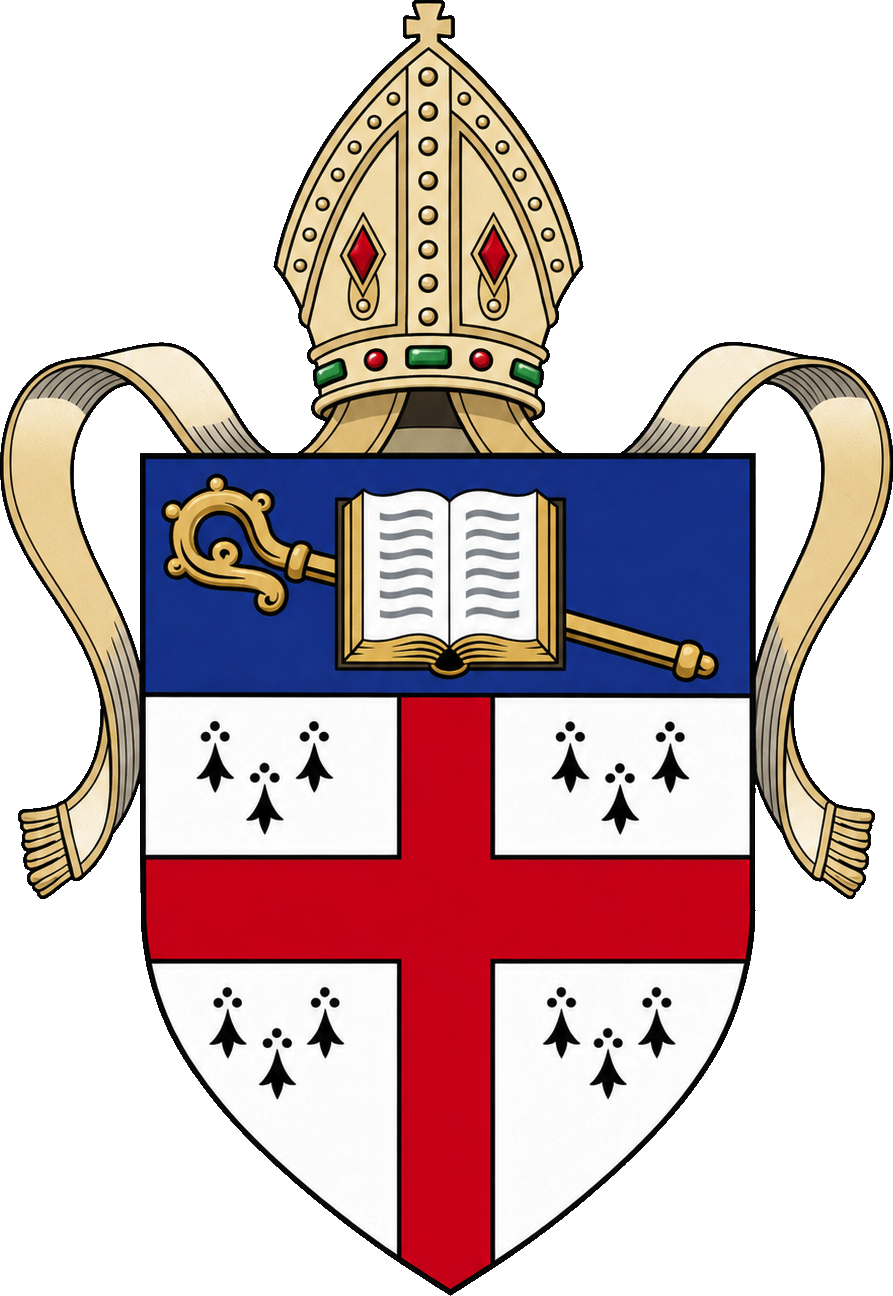

Location
- Ecclesiastical province: Northern Lights

Statistics
- Parishes: 52 (2022)
- Members: 4,215 (2022)

Information
- Rite: Anglican
- Cathedral: Cathedral of St. John, Winnipeg

Current leadership
- Bishop: Naboth Manzongo

Map
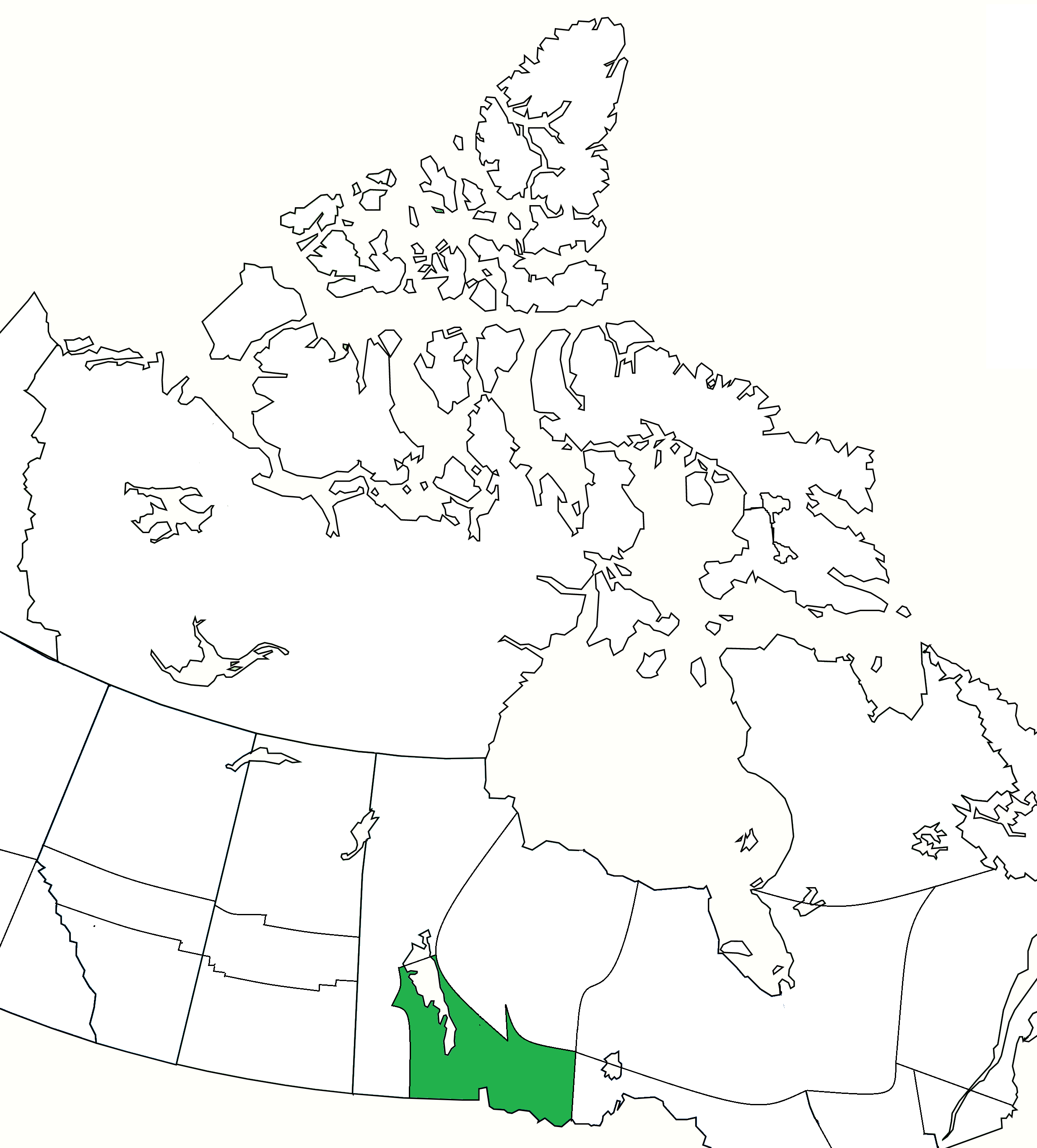
- Location of the diocese within the Province of the Northern Lights

Website
- rupertsland.ca

The Diocese of Rupert's Land is a diocese of the Ecclesiastical Province of the Northern Lights of the Anglican Church of Canada. It is named for the historical British North American territory of Rupert's Land, which was contained within the original diocesan boundaries.

The diocese is located in southern Manitoba and north-western Ontario, consisting of the area immediately surrounding Winnipeg, stretching north from the Canada–US border to near the top of Lake Winnipeg, and extending over the Ontario border to incorporate the parishes of the former southern region of the Diocese of Keewatin. Its See city is Winnipeg, and its approximately 14,000 Anglicans on the parish rolls are served by 74 congregations, of which 32 are located in Winnipeg. Major centres, apart from Winnipeg, include Selkirk, Portage la Prairie, and Kenora.

The area of the diocese was the cradle of European settlement in western Canada, and was thus the original locus of Anglican missionary activity there. The first Anglican service was held at the Red River Colony in 1820, and three years later the first Anglican church in western Canada was constructed. In 1849, the diocese was formally established with jurisdiction over all the territory of present-day Canada west of Ontario, as well as parts of northern and western Ontario. In 1866, there were two archdeaconries: W. Cochrane was Archdeacon of Assiniboia and James Hunter of Cumberland. The first synod was convened twenty years later, and the diocese was incorporated in 1886.

The diocese played an important part in the growing autonomy of Anglicanism in Canada. After the Diocese of British Columbia was hived off in 1859, Rupert Land's second bishop, Robert Machray, helped divide the still sprawling diocese into four smaller ones, creating in 1874 the new dioceses of Athabasca, Moosonee and Saskatchewan and a new ecclesiastical province which was also named after Rupert's Land.

Machray would go on to become the first Primate of the Church of England in Canada, playing an instrumental role in establishing the Lambeth Conference of worldwide Anglican bishops, now one of the instruments of unity of the Anglican Communion. During the 19th and early 20th centuries, the diocese also played a key role in the missionary activity of the Anglican Church in western Canada, particularly in the prairie provinces and the Arctic.

The original vast territory of the Diocese of Rupert's Land is now served by 18 dioceses (British Columbia has been divided into 5 dioceses, gained 1, and is now a separate province, Athabasca has been divided into 4 and lost 2, Moosonee has been transferred to the province of Ontario, Saskatchewan has been divided into 5 and the residual Rupert's Land further subdivided into 4). Before the August 2014 incorporation of the north-western Ontario parishes (formerly part of the Diocese of Keewatin), the geographical expanse of the diocese was 72,500 square kilometres.

The most recent bishop of Rupert's Land (the 13th) was Geoffrey Woodcroft, who was consecrated in 2018. The dean of the diocese and rector of St. John's Cathedral was the Very Reverend Paul Johnson until 2024. In 2025, Naboth Manzongo was elected as the next diocesan bishop.

The diocese sponsored a lay order, the Company of the Cross, which ran a controversial school for boys called Saint John's Cathedral Boys' School that was closed in the 1990s. The school was conservative and prided itself in pushing boys to their physical and psychological breaking points. It spawned two other schools, Saint John's School of Alberta and Saint John's School of Ontario, where 12 boys and a teacher died on a poorly planned canoe trip.

== Bishops of Rupert's Land ==
- David Anderson, 1849–1864
- Robert Machray, 1865–1904; Metropolitan of Rupert's Land, 1875–1904;Primate of All Canada, 1893–1904
- Samuel Matheson, 1905–1931; Metropolitan of Rupert's Land, 1905–1931; Primate of All Canada, 1909–1932
- Isaac Stringer, 1931–1934; Metropolitan of Rupert's Land, 1931–1934
- Malcolm Harding, 1934–1942; Metropolitan of Rupert's Land, 1935–1942
- Louis Sherman, 1943–1953; Metropolitan of Rupert's Land, 1943–1953
- Walter Barfoot, 1954–1960; Metropolitan of Rupert's Land, 1954–1960; Primate of All Canada, 1949–1959
- Howard Clark, 1961–1969; Metropolitan of Rupert's Land, 1961–1969; Primate of All Canada, 1959–1971
  - John Anderson (suffragan 1967–1969; translated to BC)
- Barry Valentine, 1969–1982
- Walter H. Jones, 1983–1993; Metropolitan of Rupert's Land, 1988–1993
- Patrick Lee, 1994–1999
- Don Phillips, 2000–2018
- Geoffrey Woodcroft, 2018–2025
- Naboth Manzongo, 2025-Present
