= Syed Soharwardy =

Pakistani–Canadian Islamic scholar

Sheikh Al Islam Pir Syed Baddiudin Soharwardy
- Born: 1955 (age 70–71); Karachi, Pakistan
- Education: B.A. University of Karachi; B.S. NED University of Engineering and Technology; M.S.New Jersey Institute of Technology; M.Eng University of Calgary
- Occupations: Islamic scholar, senior IT consultant
- Known for: President of the Islamic Supreme Council of Canada
- Parent: Syed Riazuddin Soharwardy (father)

Hazrat Al Imaam ul imams Allama Mufti Mulana Al Sheikh ul Islam Pir Syed Azaam Badiuddin Soharwardy Shaah Sahb D.B (born 1955 in Karachi) is a Pakistani–Canadian Islamic scholar, a sheikh of the Suhrawardi Sufi order, chairman of the Al-Madinah Calgary Islamic Assembly, and is the founder and current president of the Islamic Supreme Council of Canada. In January 1998, he founded the group Muslims Against Terrorism.

== Biography ==
A direct descendant (Sayyid) of Muhammad, Soharwardy studied Islam at Dar-ul-Aloom Soharwardia, a traditional Islamic madrasah (school) founded by his father Allama Syed Riazuddin Soharwardy, the imam of the Jamia Baghdadi Masjid in Karachi, Pakistan. His grandfather Syed Jalaluddin Chishty had been the Grand Mufti of Kashmir before moving to Amritsar in India to become the head of Dar-ul-Aloom Nizamiah Sirajiah in the wake of the Partition of India. After earning a B.A. in Islamic Studies from the University of Karachi and a degree in electrical engineering from NED University of Engineering and Technology in Karachi, he later earned a M.Sc. in management engineering from New Jersey Institute of Technology and a M.Eng. in project management from the University of Calgary, he is certified as a project manager from Project Management Institute. First appointed as a teacher at Dar-ul-Aloom Soharwardia in Karachi, where he taught Islamic studies, he later served as an assistant Imam and Kahteeb at Jamia Bughdadi Masjid (1971-1979), He has lectured on Islam in Pakistan, Saudi Arabia, the United States and Canada at various universities and institutes.

Soharwardy has authored papers on information technology management, Islamic beliefs, challenges for Muslims in the Western world, conflicts within the Muslim community and interreligious conflict. He is the head of the first Dar-ul-Aloom in Calgary, where he teaches Islamic studies and he delivers lectures to Muslim congregations across Canada.

Soharwardy is a Sufi and has the Ijazah (certificate) in Soharwardy, Qadiriyya, and Chistiyya Sufi orders from his Murshid (spiritual guide).

His brother is naat recitor Fasihuddin Soharwardi.

== Activities ==
Soharwardy is a strong supporter of multifaith religious cooperation. As a leader of Canada's Multifaith walk against violence, he walked 6,500 kilometers across Canada to draw attention to the problems of child abuse, domestic violence, elder abuse, gangs, bullying, terrorism and war.

In February 2006, Soharwardy and the Edmonton Council of Muslim Communities complained to the Alberta Human Rights and Citizenship Commission about the publication by the Western Standard of the Jyllands-Posten Muhammad cartoons depicting Muhammad. On the day of the hearing the Western Standard's publisher, Ezra Levant republished the cartoons on his website. In February 2008, he withdrew his complaint.

Soharwardy also holds a very close relationship with the Government of Canada, having reported other Muslim organizations in the past for terrorism related activities such as the AlMaghrib Institute.

== Fatwa and positions ==
Soharwardy believes that "Sharia cannot be customized for specific countries. These universal, divine laws are for all people of all countries for all times."

In February 2012, in response to the [Shafia family murders], Soharwardy issued a fatwa against honor killings stating: "Within the Muslim community, there are a few clergy people — it's a very small number, no doubt about it — who misinterpret the Qur'an and say it is OK to beat a wife. That kind of mentality has to be changed, and has to be confronted.”

In August 2014, after publicly noting that the Islamic State of Iraq and the Levant (ISIL) is actively recruiting in Canada and calling on Canadian and western authorities to intensify the fight against jihadist movements, Soharwardy received death threats from ISIL supporters.

In March 2015, Soharwardy issued a fatwa against the Islamic State of Iraq and the Levant stating that what they teach violates the Quran and declaring that they are not Muslim stating: "I want to create awareness about the nature of their work — they are using Islam, they are quoting Qur'an, they look like Muslims, they pray like Muslims but they are not Muslim. They are deviant people, and they are doing exactly everything which goes against Islam." He went on to call them Khawarij, a derogatory Arabic word for "outsiders" that refers to a violent, heretical spinoff of Islam that emerged shortly after the religion’s 7th-century founding. 37 other Muslim leaders in Canada also signed the fatwa.

Titles in Islam
Preceded by Position established	Self-Appointed Chairman of the Islamic Supreme Council of Canada (Self-Appointed Grand Mufti of Canada); 2000–present	Incumbent
