= Link Byfield =

Canadian writer and politician (1951–2015)

- Born: Eric Linkord Byfield; December 5, 1951; Ottawa, Ontario, Canada
- Died: January 24, 2015 (aged 63); St. Albert, Alberta, Canada
- Occupations: Columnist; publisher; author
- Political party: Wildrose (2008–2015)
- Other political affiliations: Wildrose (2007–2007); Independent (2004–2006)
- Spouse: Joanne Byfield
- Children: 4
- Father: Ted Byfield
- Awards: Alberta Centennial Medal (2005)

Eric Linkord Byfield (December 5, 1951 – January 24, 2015) was a Canadian news columnist, author, and politician.

== Columnist and writer ==
Byfield was editor and publisher for the now defunct Alberta Report magazine for eighteen years.

One of six siblings born to Ted, a conservative columnist, and Virginia Byfield, Link became a columnist for the Calgary Sun and occasionally was published in the Calgary Herald, National Post, Globe and Mail and Winnipeg Free Press.

== Lobbyist ==
Byfield founded the Citizens Centre for Freedom and Democracy, a lobby group dedicated to "advocating responsible government."

== Senator in waiting ==
Byfield was the first to declare his candidacy for the 2004 Alberta Senate nominee election on September 27, 2004. He decided to remain independent of the other parties, and was one of two independent senator-in-waiting candidates (the other being Tom Sindlinger). He was elected to the 4th and final spot in the block vote with 236,382 votes. He was the first independent senator-in-waiting, and the first independent elected in an Alberta election since Raymond Speaker and Walt Buck in 1982. In 2005, Byfield received the Alberta Centennial Medal.

== Provincial politics ==
Byfield helped found the Wildrose Party of Alberta in 2007, which merged with the Alberta Alliance Party on January 19, 2008, shortly before a provincial general election was called. He unsuccessfully contested the riding of Whitecourt-Ste. Anne for the post-merger Wildrose Alliance in that 2008 election.

The party dropped "Alliance" from its name for media purposes prior to the 2012 general election and Byfield ran as the Wildrose Party candidate for Barrhead-Morinville-Westlock in that April election. He lost by a narrow margin, falling short of the Progressive Conservative candidate by less than 5% of the vote.

== Death ==
On January 24, 2015, Byfield died of liver and esophageal cancer, aged 63, in the Sturgeon Community Hospital in St. Albert, Alberta, just north of Edmonton. He was survived by his father, his wife Joanne, four children and four siblings. A tribute held in Byfield's honour at Calgary's Manning Centre for Building Democracy in September feted him as a key figure in western conservatism.
