= Geoffrey Woodcroft =

Canadian Anglican bishop (born c. 1954)

The Right Reverend Geoffrey Woodcroft
- 13th Bishop of Rupert's Land
- Church: Anglican Church of Canada
- Province: Northern Lights
- Diocese: Rupert's Land
- Installed: 2018
- Term ended: 2025
- Predecessor: Donald Phillips
- Successor: Naboth Manzongo

Orders
- Ordination: 1990
- Consecration: 2018 by Greg Kerr-Wilson

Personal details
- Born: Ontario, Canada
- Denomination: Anglicanism
- Education: Huron University College

Geoffrey John Joseph Woodcroft is a Canadian Anglican bishop. He was the 13th bishop of the Diocese of Rupert's Land in the Anglican Church of Canada from 2018 to 2025.

Woodcroft was educated at Huron University College. Woodcroft was ordained a priest in 1990. He served in the Diocese of Algoma before moving to the Diocese of Rupert's Land to take up the ministry of chaplain at St. John's College, University of Manitoba. He was the incumbent at St Paul, Fort Garry, Winnipeg from 2003 until his election to the episcopate.

In October 2024, the diocese announced that Woodcroft had been diagnosed with terminal cancer. He immediately went on medical leave and announced his retirement effective June 2025.

Religious titles
Preceded by Donald Phillips	Bishop of Rupert's Land; 2018–2025	Succeeded by Naboth Manzongo
