= Saint John's Cathedral Boys' School =

Former boarding school in Manitoba

Location
- Winnipeg, Manitoba; Canada; 50.18188°N 96.84642°W

Information
- Type: Boarding school
- Religious affiliation: Anglican
- Established: Early 1960s
- Closed: Early 1990s
- Gender: Boys

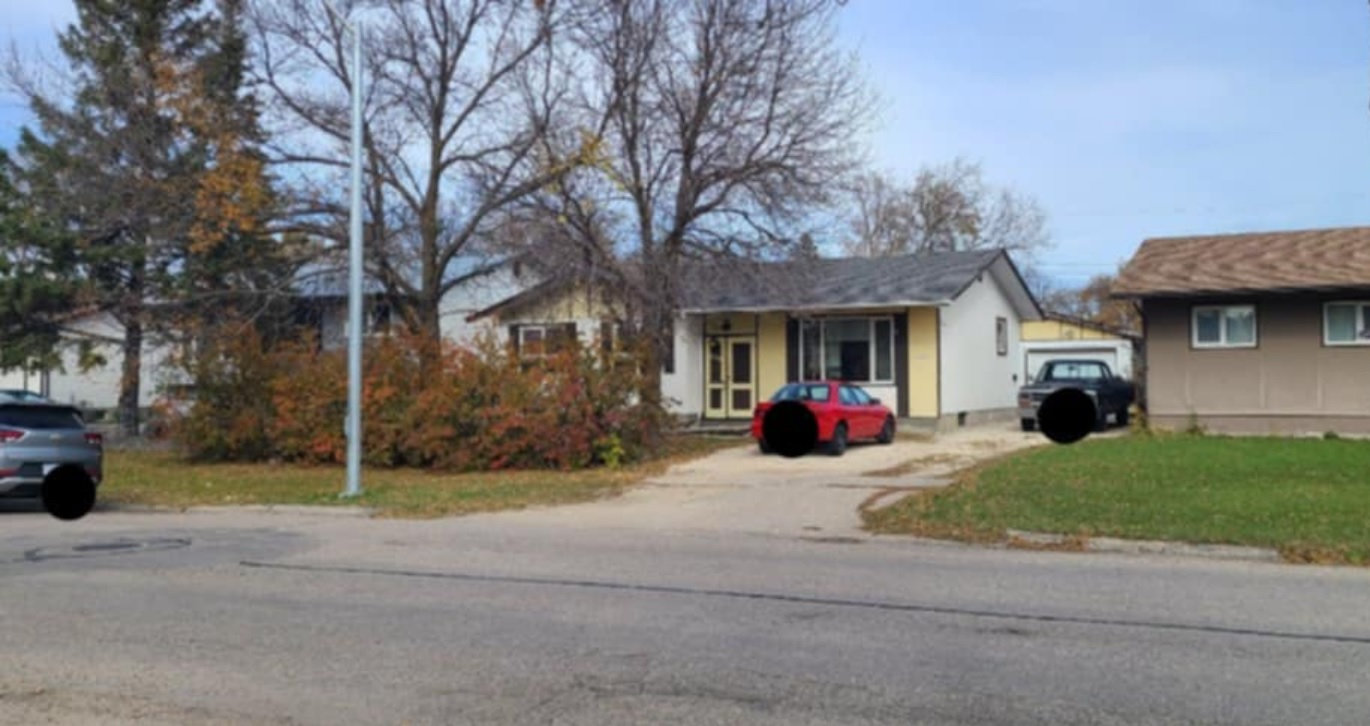
Saint John's Cathedral Boys' School

Saint John's Cathedral School (SJCS) was a private Anglican boarding school for boys named for the Saint John's Cathedral in Winnipeg, Manitoba, Canada, out of whose youth program it had emerged". It was the first in a series of schools, operated from 1958 until 2008, by an Anglican lay religious order called the Company of the Cross.

== History ==
The school was founded in the early 1960s by Ted Byfield and Frank Wiens, who became the school's director.

They started an Anglican lay order called the Company of the Cross, based on the writings of Christian apologists, such as Dorothy L. Sayers, C.S. Lewis, and G. K. Chesterton. Originally, the Company of the Cross was under the authority of the resident bishop in Winnipeg, officially called the Diocese of Rupert's Land.

Ted Byfield, Frank Wiens, and over a dozen other men—many of them from the St. John's Cathedral choir, formed a cell or group, that shared similar beliefs. They founded a lay Anglican order, affiliated with the Anglican Church of Canada, which they first called the Dynevor Society, after the Dynevor Indian Hospital in Selkirk, north of Winnipeg, a property they had acquired. They believed that the education of boys in public schools was not training them to develop strong character and Christian values. They organized a boys choir at St. John's Cathedral, which first became a club, then a weekend residential school starting in 1957, and finally, in 1962, a full-time traditionalist Anglican private boarding schools for boys. The Company of the Cross had acquired the abandoned Dynevor Indian Hospital where they held their weekend schools. The cell officially changed their name from Dynevor to the Company of the Cross under the Manitoba Societies Act. In 1962, Byfield and five other members of the Company opened the first in a series of St. John's full-time boarding schools for boys "dedicated to the reassertion of Christian educational principles"—Saint John's Cathedral Boys' School.

The school operated intentionally on traditional methods. They used mathematics textbooks from pre-World War II advancing from "arithmetic to calculus" with constant testing. Ginger Byfield taught French "developed from French-Canadian history." They watched hockey on the French channel. Byfield taught history which required that students read copiously from Thomas Costain to Francis Parkman.

The Company of the Cross teachers and staff were paid $1.00 per day and provided room and board. In 1973, parents paid $1700 a year tuition.

Arduous row-boat trips (called "cutters"), later replaced by canoes, and snowshoeing and dog-sledding, were part of the outdoor education program. The school's founders believed that boys should be pushed to what they might believe is their breaking points, and this would build character. The school was seen by many as a way to help troubled boys, usually from 11 to 14 years of age. Its primary focus was challenging boys from every social stratum to work together in order to grow morally, physically, intellectually and spiritually in the tradition of Victorian muscular Christianity. The 1974 National Film Board Film described the St. John's Cathedral Boys' School as the "most demanding outdoor school in North America." Upon arrival at the school, the new boys, 13 to 15 years old, undertook a two-week 330 mi (530 km) canoe trip and in the spring there was a second longer canoe trip covering 900 mi (1,400 km) with 55 portages.

Ted Byfield wrote in 1996 that rules were enforced with a "flat stick across the seat of the pants" in the early years of the school. In the article, Byfield defended this practice as acceptable at the time.

The students ran the physical plant of the school, doing all the janitorial work, cooking and serving food, cleaning kennels, making and selling processed meat products door-to-door for fundraising, and raising sled dogs.

Two other schools, Saint John's School of Alberta and Saint John's School of Ontario were founded on the same ideas in later years.

The school closed in the early 1990s, struggling for funds and credibility after a canoeing disaster on Lake Timiskaming where 13 people died of hypothermia.

== Incidents ==
In the fall of 1973, the National Film Board of Canada filmed the two-week canoe trip on the Red River and Lake Winnipeg, with the 13- to 15-year-old boys who had just arrived at the school. It was part of CBC-TV's series, West.

In early 1976, a boy by the name of Ted Milligan collapsed while on one of the school's lengthy snowshoe hikes, and froze to death. He was rushed to the closest hospital in the town of Selkirk and pronounced clinically dead. A doctor who specialized in hypothermia managed to bring him back to life. For a brief period, Milligan was listed in the Guinness World Records as a person clinically dead for the longest time and then brought back to life.

In 2000, a former teacher, Kenneth Mealey, pleaded guilty to sexually assaulting five students in 1982 and 1983. A Canadian Broadcasting Corporation article on his sentencing said that "St. John's school administrators knew about the assault allegations but chose to fire Mealey instead of calling the authorities".

== Bibliography ==
- Robert Young Pelton (19 June 2001). The Adventurist, My Life in Dangerous Places. Broadway. ISBN 978-0767905763.
- James Raffan (18 April 2002). Deep Water. Phyllis Bruce Books. ISBN 978-0-00-200037-6.
