= Saint John's School of Alberta =

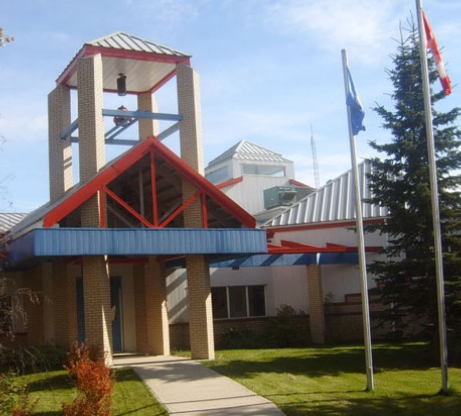

Location
- near Edmonton, Alberta; Canada; 53°22′50.5″N 114°17′4.7″W

Information
- Type: residential, boys
- Religious affiliations: Anglican (conservative), unofficial
- Patron saint: John
- Established: 1967
- Closed: 2008
- Campus: Stony Plain, Alberta
- Colors: Red and Grey
- Website: http://www.sjsa.ab.ca/

Saint John's School of Alberta (SJSA) was a small private boys' boarding school in Genesee, Alberta, Canada which operated from 1968 to 2008, the second of three such schools founded on conservative Anglican ideas and the notion that children were not challenged by present-day society. It closed in June 2008. Ted Byfield was one of the school's founders.

The school provided a strict, traditional education with corporal punishment and an extensive outdoor program that included snowshoeing, hiking, canoeing, ice hockey, lacrosse and other rigorous and challenging activities.

Two other 'Saint John's Schools' had already closed. They were Saint John's Cathedral Boys' School in Selkirk, Manitoba (near Winnipeg), and Saint John's School of Ontario (Toronto area).

== Core philosophical beliefs ==
The school was conservative in social and religious outlook. Following is a listing of the main principles espoused by the school:

=== Perseverance is a virtue ===
The ability to go on when you want to lie down and quit is important. Most people can do far more than they ever thought possible. Success in doing the difficult in one area makes it easier to succeed in another.

=== Courage is a virtue ===
It is not wrong to be afraid. It is right to face your fears, and do your utmost to overcome them. "Without real danger there can be no real adventure. Without real adventure, there can be no real growth." [Ted Byfiled, Men Wanted—Staff Recruiting Manual]

=== Faith is a virtue ===
When the world is dark about you, strength comes from your faith in God. Grace is said before every meal. On trips the day starts with Morning Prayer, and finishes with Compline. The religious connections of the school had diminished over the years, to the point that it described itself as non-denominational and staff did not consider themselves as members of a faith or religious community.

=== Work is honorable ===
Chores decrease the costs of running the school, making it less expensive for all. They also ensure that no student need fear unemployment.

=== Strength and learning come through hard work ===
These were organized in the form of exercise and study. Study is foreign to the wishes of most boys, so the school has supervised study for all boys whose marks are below 75%.

=== Actions have consequences ===
There are rules. Flout them, and receive the consequences.

==== Corporal punishment ====
The school's historic use of "swat sticks" to spank the boys for virtually any infraction with (0.4-metre-long pieces of wood, similar to a US school paddle) was defended by founder Ted Byfield as being among the positive and character-forming aspects of the schools.

Paddlings continued until the 2003 school year (Confirmed).

==== Revised discipline in later years ====
Updated discipline included things like: marks below minimum received supervised study in the dining room instead of the dorm; homework not done for class, free time spent in learning centre with a teacher to help; late for class: Run 1 km; swear in the presence of a teacher, 10-20 pushups; running in the hall, go back and walk; talking after lights out, stand in silence in the hallway for half an hour while dorm mates get to sleep. Bully and get a 5-day suspension; do it again - expelled; bring drugs into the school, suspension and counselling, required attendance at a program to stop using and periodic urine tests thereafter.

=== Staff were expected to lead by example ===
Eighty percent of the frontline staff participated in the outdoor program. Many staff had a chore crew to oversee, and they often joined in the task at hand.

== Controversy about the outdoor program ==
=== Ted Milligan, 1976 hypothermia case ===
The school's outdoor program was news on several occasions. This incident took place at St. John's Cathedral Boys' School in Selkirk, Manitoba and was the basis for an article in the Canadian edition of Reader's Digest "Drama in Real Life". In 1976, Ted Milligan collapsed with hypothermia two miles from the school while on a voluntary training run for the "Interschool Snowshoe Race" held annually between the Manitoba and Alberta schools. The day started out warm, but at sunset, the temperature dropped rapidly. Milligan's clothes were soaked with sweat, and he chilled. Initially he was thought dead, with no detectable pulse by the school's nurse. He was unresponsive to resuscitation efforts. At the Selkirk Hospital, doctors heated up the ER and wisely placed an ice pack on his head to prevent thermal shock to his brain. In time, he was revived and was awake and alert the following morning.

Ted Milligan's ordeal established medical history as being one of the first deep hypothermia victims brought back. He has no effects of the incident besides memory loss of the incident itself. (Common in hypothermia cases.) As a consequence of this incident, the school instituted a policy of mandatory cold weather hypothermia training for all staff and students to be completed before the start of the winter season every year. The school also required polypro instead of cotton long underwear, required that cotton-based outerwear not be used, and that all personnel would carry their parka with them at all times on snowshoe runs. The school issued a day pack to make carrying the parka easier on warm days.

=== Markus Janisch, 1970s death ===
Markus Janisch, collapsed during the Interschool Snowshoe Race, and died at the Alberta school from an undetected (and with the medical technology of the era, undetectable) brain aneurysm. The autopsy report stated that this type of aneurysm would typically have burst before the patient was age 20.

=== Response to Lake Temiskaming canoeing disaster at St. John's School of Ontario ===
On a canoe trip from the Ontario School on 11 June 1978, 12 boys and one staff member died on Lake Temiskaming from drowning and hypothermia. At the inquest into the deaths, the coroner determined that the trip could have been better planned but that the school was not negligent.

==== Program changes, post-Temiskaming ====
- Bowsmen must have 10 days' experience as a paddler.
- Steersman must have 10 days' experience as a bowsman.
- All paddlers must pass a test on cold-water hypothermia every year.
- All paddlers must have a minimum of 8 hours' paddling instruction and practice under controlled conditions (protected area, rescue boat nearby) before undertaking an expedition.
- All paddlers must participate in two dumping practices before each trip to become familiar with the rescue procedures, both as victims and as rescuers.
- All voyageur canoes carried an inflatable life raft. These were rechecked as per manufacturer's recommendation.
- The school put in place rules regarding hours travelled, hours rested, hours a driver could drive, and the frequency and spacing of meals leading up to the trip. All of this was to prevent personnel from commencing trips in exhausted states.
- All non-trivial rapids are scouted from shore.
- Any person if worried about the safety of the rapid can opt out. This includes bowsmen and steersmen.
- The brigade leader may decide that a given individual is not qualified to shoot a particular rapid.

After Temiskaming there were no dumpings on lakes. In the 1990s the school began retiring its fleet of specially designed "Selkirk"-style canoes in favour of the Mariner design from Clipper Canoes in Abbotsford, B.C. These canoes were more stable, with greater freeboard and width.

== Corporal punishment and outdoor program changes ==
Some policies changed over the years: some time before corporal punishment in Canadian schools became illegal in 2004, the spanking of students with wooden paddles for infractions at St John's was ended.

Underlying attitudes and ideology did not change. The school continued to have an outdoor education program with snowshoe training and races (now shortened from the original one-day, 16-hour races of 50 miles (80 km), canoe trips and other outdoor excursions. The school pushed students to their physical and psychological limits; the wilderness excursions emphasized endurance and challenge.

The students were required to participate in four core programs: academics, outdoor, work (chores) and sales. The school employed a janitor who came four times a week, but the students did most of the work including, but not limited to, taking care of the sled dogs, building and repairing sleds, harness and traces, cleaning dorms, shovelling walks in winter, yardwork in spring and fall, cleaning the kitchen, dining room, and laundry (using the machines, sorting, and distributing). The school had 60 students from grades 7 to 12 when it closed, down from the 106 boys capacity.

Tuition fees as listed on the school's website ranged from about $9,000 for day students to $23,000 for residential students. In 2007–08, 80% of the enrollment was residential.

== Company of the Cross ==
The school was run by a religious order called the Company of the Cross, which was a lay order of the Anglican Church of Canada, but the relationship to the church is presently unclear, having changed over time from the specific church control and sponsorship described in the Company's documentation to informal, i.e., not acknowledged or listed on any official document of the Anglican Diocese of Edmonton or Anglican Church. The school later labelled itself nondenominational.

=== Internal documents ===
(source: Stephen Riley, archives, St. John's Cathedral, Winnipeg), p. 2: From an undated document entitled "The student and the Master"

"The Necessity of Discipline"
We are, as Christians, supposed to know the world and be able to cope with it. One of the greatest temptations put forth by the world is to buy its fantasy picture of reality. This fantasy would have us believe that
a) all people are basically good;
b) that we don't have to work to eat;
c) that getting the work finished is more important than how well it is done;
d) that carelessness won't end in tragedy;
e) that children know what is best for them.
Discipline is necessary in every society to keep it functioning because human nature is not basically good."

(from the same document, p. 15, comes a warning to the staff that each member must be consistent in applying the policy on discipline. It says there is no room for "Mr. Nice Guy."):

"1. You know school policy, follow it.
2. If it offends you aesthetically - leave and quit undermining everyone else.
3. If you want to stay, change before you are asked to leave."

(from the same document, p. 17):

"spanking is permissible in class or study but be aware of two things:
1) If you fear a confrontation, don't try it.
2) Don't humiliate a boy and make him cry in front of the group."

== Legal problems ==
=== Criminal charges ===
Paul 'Chester' Nordahl, a teacher from St. John's School of Alberta, was charged with one count of assault causing bodily harm in 1990.

After the school initiated a letter-writing campaign to the Attorney general of Alberta, the Chief Crown prosecutor, the Minister of Social Services, the M.L.A. for Drayton Valley and Mr. Tom Thurber, the charges were eventually stayed. (reference: freedom of information documents)

=== Child welfare investigations ===
In January 1990, Alberta Family and Social Services conducted an investigation that was obtained by a freedom of information request. This is a summary of the document that is available in full form in Wikisource.

Summary:

Complaint received from former student that discipline at St. John's school is

done with a three foot long board and often results in bruising. Only male teachers are permitted to "swat" boys, and detailed records are kept. Child Welfare Act defines acts which cause bruising as physical abuse. St John's School is a private high school, southwest of Edmonton, with about 130 students and 30 staff.

— 19 January 1990 report, number 90024-0173 Alberta Family and Social Services

A boy complained to child welfare authorities that the school's discipline of him with a 3-foot-long (0.91 m) stick, measuring 1 by 4 inches (25 by 102 mm), had caused bruises. The investigators examined the child, and found bruising consistent with the measurements of the stick. The Royal Canadian Mounted Police (RCMP) investigated because causing bruises in such circumstances is considered infliction of bodily harm. The investigators noted that prior complaints were received before 1983. The investigation noted that six children had run away to avoid the physical punishment of being hit with the sticks, and this was known to the RCMP from previous reports. It was also noted that older children physically assaulted younger children during supervision of chores and other activities. The Wikisource document should be consulted for complete details. The document also contains an initial heavily edited response by the school, also obtained by freedom of information request (the indication of "SEC. 17" in the document indicates censored information with the freedom of information request).

=== Lawsuits ===
The school was sued for $3.5 million in 2003 by Jeffrey Richard Birkin regarding "psychological and physical mistreatment" on a "new boy wilderness trip" in 1976. The claim listed direct physical abuse involving being hit by teachers causing physical injuries, and having been subjected to degrading and humiliating treatment. The outcome of the lawsuit is not clear, possibly a negotiated and sealed settlement. In a 1990s interview, founder Ted Byfield agreed that some of the treatment of students in past times would be considered excessive and worthy of criminal charges if they occurred today.

The school had been previously sued in 1996 by Matt Riddel who lost 9 toes on a 4-day, 50-kilometre snowshoe and dogsled trip during which temperatures dropped to -28 degrees C. The outcome of this lawsuit was a negotiated and sealed settlement in 1999.

Kenneth 'Feely' Mealey, a teacher at Saint John's School of Alberta, Saint John's Cathedral Boys' School and Saint John's School of Ontario, was jailed for sexual abuse of students in the 1980s.

== Media portrayals ==
=== "Boys Adrift", book ===
Leonard Sax's second book, Boys Adrift, mentions Saint John's School implicitly in two separate illustrations. Sax's view of the school seems to be favorable, as its philosophy conforms with his views on single-sex education.

=== The Old Boys, television documentary ===
From The Old Boys a television documentary broadcast by CBC Manitoba on 28 February 1990 (produced by Stephen Riley; reporter was Robert Enright) interview subject was Patrick Treacy, who spent four years at the Manitoba school during the 1970s. Treacy was deemed by staff at the time to be one of the best students there.

=== The New Boys, film ===
In 1974, the National Film Board of Canada filmed a documentary about sister school, St. John's Cathedral Boys' School.

=== Weekend Magazine No. 5, 1968 ===
From a story by James Quig p. 6 quoting Frank Wiens, (headmaster and co-founder of St. John's Cathedral Boys' School, Selkirk).

== School closure and the future ==
On 14 July 2008, the acting head master, Peter Jackson, posted a notice on the school's website that the school is closed for the 2008–2009 year citing a lack of instructors and a lack of students. The school was permanently closed in December 2008, although some former students and teachers have been discussing a revival which minimizes or severs connections with the old schools and what they see as the tainted St. John's "brand-name".

Saint John's premises now house Mother Earth's Children's Charter School (MECCS), attended by some First Nation, Metis, & Inuit (FNMI) K-09 students from the neighboring communities.
