= Islamic Supreme Council of Canada =

Islamic organization based in Calgary, Alberta, Canada

The Islamic Supreme Council of Canada (ISCC; French: Le Conseil Suprême Islamique de Canada) is a Canadian Muslim organization based in Calgary, Alberta. It was founded in 2000 by Sufi Imam Syed Soharwardy with the aims of fostering Canadian understanding of Islam, contributing to society in general, guiding Canadian institutions on the needs of Muslims, furthering Canadian relationships with Muslim-majority countries and organizing Canadian Muslims as a voting bloc. The ISCC has four major objectives: to propagate the teaching and observance of Islam, to support a Muslim house of worship, to proselytize Islam and to establish and operate an Islamic school.

== Fatwa condemning terrorism ==
In response to the bombing attempt on Northwest Airlines Flight 253 a group of Canadian and U.S. Islamic leaders associated with the Islamic Supreme Council of Canada issued a fatwa, or religious edict, on January 8, 2010 condemning any attacks by extremists or terrorists on the United States or Canada and declaring that an attack by extremists on the two countries would constitute an attack on Muslims living in North America. "In our view, these attacks are evil, and Islam requires Muslims to stand up against this evil," said the fatwa signed by the 20 imams. It concludes that Muslims "must expose any person, Muslim or non-Muslim, who would cause harm to fellow Canadians or Americans". One of the imams was reported saying: "it is religious obligation upon Muslims, based upon the Qur'anic teachings, that we have to be loyal to the country where we live". The fatwa also indicated that religious leaders have a duty to show others around the world that Muslims in Canada and the U.S. "have complete freedom to practise Islam" and that "any attack on Canada and the United States is an attack on the freedom of Canadian and American Muslims."

== See also ==
- Islam in Canada
- Canadian Islamic Congress
- National Council of Canadian Muslims
- Islamic Society of North America
