= Saint John's School of Ontario =

Saint John's School of Ontario (SJSO) was the third of three private Anglican boys' boarding schools in Toronto founded on conservative Anglican ideas and the notion that children were not challenged by present-day society.

== School ==
The two other defunct schools are Saint John's Cathedral Boys' School, Winnipeg, and Saint John's School of Alberta which closed in 2008. The school's program included academics, outdoor education, and chores. Corporal punishment, in the form of hard paddlings delivered to the student's buttocks, was frequently administered at all three schools. The School also had several purges, where students were made to stand for up to 15 hours with no food or water. This was used to make students surrender any contraband, such as cigarettes or even candy.

The school, founded in 1977, is best known for the canoeing disaster on Lake Timiskaming on 11 June 1978, where 12 children and 1 volunteer died of hypothermia, after their canoes capsized. Inexperience and poor planning were blamed for the accident according to a book written by James Raffan. However, Scott Sorenson, the lodge owner who rescued the survivors and testified at the inquest, takes a very different point of view in his book. Despite the tragedy and probable liability, none of the parents of the deceased took legal action against the school. The parents' understanding of the accident contrasts with that put forward in Raffan's book, and aligns with that of Sorenson's book, that it was simply a terrible accident and that their sons had been the beneficiaries of good education and experiences, except for the canoeing deaths, would have been considered positively.

The school continued to operate for several years but suffered a fire and a serious car accident in which the headmaster, Frank Felletti, was injured and disabled. In the end, insufficient operating funds were the cause of the school's closure in 1989. In the summer of 2007, alumni from the three St. John's schools gathered for a reunion in Ontario. School alumni have created a Facebook group.
